= Peiper =

Peiper is a surname. Notable people with the surname include:

- Allan Peiper (born 1960), Australian road cyclist and team manager
- Joachim Peiper (1915–1976), German war criminal and SS leader
- Tadeusz Peiper (1891–1969), Polish poet, art critic, and theoretician of literature

== See also ==
- Fefer/Feffer, Feifer/Feiffer, Peifer/Peiffer, Pfeifer/Pfeiffer, Pfefer/Pfeffer, Pfeufer/Pfeuffer, Pheiffer, Phifer
- Paeper, Peiper, Peper/Pepper/Peppers, Peperzak, Peeper, Pieper, Piepers, Pijper/Pijpers, Piper, Pyper
