= Pyper =

Given name

Pyper is a surname and a given name. Notable people so named include:

- Andrew Pyper (1968–2025), Canadian writer of fiction
- Gavin Pyper (born 1979), British motor racing driver
- George D. Pyper (1860–1943), the fifth general superintendent of the Sunday School of The LDS Church)
- Jenny Pyper, Northern Ireland civil servant
- John Pyper-Ferguson (born 1964), Australian-born actor
- Laura Pyper, Northern Irish actress
- Pyper America (born 1997), American fashion model and musician

== See also ==
- Fefer/Feffer, Feifer/Feiffer, Peifer/Peiffer, Pfeifer/Pfeiffer, Pfefer/Pfeffer, Pfeufer/Pfeuffer, Pheiffer, Phifer
- Paeper, Peper/Pepper/Peppers, Peperzak, Peeper, Pieper, Piepers, Pijper/Pijpers, Piper, Pyper
- Piper (given name)
