= Pepper (name) =

Pepper is a given name, nickname, and surname. Notable people with the name include:

== Surname ==
- Abel C. Pepper (1793–1860), American politician and Indian agent
- Art Pepper (1925–1982), American jazz musician
- Augustus Joseph Pepper (1849–1935), British surgeon and forensic pathologist
- Barbara Pepper (1915–1969), American stage, television, radio, & film actress
- Barry Pepper (born 1970), Canadian actor
- Belville Robert Pepper (1850–1888), British singer
- Ben Pepper (born 1975), Australian professional basketball player
- Beverly Pepper (1922–2020), American sculptor
- Bill Pepper (1895–1918), English footballer
- Bob Pepper (baseball) (1895–1968), American baseball pitcher
- Bob Pepper (illustrator) (1938–2019), American illustrator
- Buddy Pepper (1922–1993), American pianist, songwriter, arranger and actor
- C. Doris Hellman Pepper (1910–1973), American historian of science
- Carl Pepper (born 1980), English footballer
- Cec Pepper (1916–1993), Australian first-class cricketer
- Charles Pepper (cricketer) (1875–1917), English first-class cricketer
- Charles T. Pepper (1830–1903), American physician
- Claude Pepper (1900–1989), U.S. Congressman from Florida
- Conor Pepper (born 1994), Irish footballer
- Curtis Bill Pepper (1917–2014), American journalist and author
- Cuthbert Pepper (died 1608), Member of Parliament in 1597 and 1601
- Cynthia Pepper (born 1940), retired American actress
- Cyril Pepper (1911–1943), New Zealand rugby union player
- Daniel Pepper (born 1989), English swimmer
- David Pepper (intelligence official) (born 1948), British civil servant, director of GCHQ
- David Pepper (politician) (born 1971), American politician
- Del Pepper (born 1937), American politician
- Devin Pepper (born 1969), United States Space Force major general
- Dick Pepper (1889–1962), English musician and writer
- Don Pepper (born 1943), American professional baseball player
- Dottie Pepper (born 1965), American golfer
- Edward Pepper (1879–1960), British Olympic gymnast
- Edwina Sheppard Pepper (1893–1988), ecologist in West Virginia
- Eleanor Pepper (1904–1997), American architect and interior designer
- Elenore Pepper (1924–2006), American field hockey player
- Elijah Pepper (born 2001), Australian-American professional basketball player
- Elizabeth Pepper (1923–2005), American editor and publisher of The Witches’ Almanac
- Elizabeth Pepper (martyr) (died 1556), burned at the stake for her Protestant beliefs
- Evelyn Pepper, CM, RRC (1905–1998), Canadian nurse and nursing sister
- Frank Pepper (1875–1914), English footballer
- Frank S. Pepper (1910–1988), British writer of comics and story papers
- Fred Pepper (1887–1950), English footballer
- G. Willing Pepper (1909–2001), Philadelphia corporate executive & philanthropist
- Gene Pepper (1927–2006), American footballer
- George Dana Boardman Pepper (1833–1913), American academic administrator
- George H. Pepper (1873–1924), American ethnologist and archaeologist
- George Pepper (artist) (1903–1962), Canadian artist
- George Pepper (film producer) (1913–1969), blacklisted Hollywood organizer and producer
- George W. Pepper (1867–1961), U.S. senator and lawyer
- Gregory Pepper, musician based in Guelph, Ontario
- Guy Pepper (born 2003), English professional rugby union player
- Hamish Pepper (born 1971), New Zealand sailor
- Harry S. Pepper (1891–1970), English light music composer and BBC producer
- Herbert Pepper (1912–2000), French songwriter
- Irvin S. Pepper (1876–1913), Democratic U.S. representative
- Jack Pepper (1902–1979), American vaudeville dancer, singer, comedian, musician
- Jacob Pepper (born 1992), Australian professional soccer player
- James Auburn Pepper (1915–1985), farmer and political figure in Saskatchewan
- James Welsh Pepper (1853–1919), American music publisher and instrument maker; founded J.W. Pepper & Son in 1876
- Jeannie Pepper (born 1958), American pornographic actress
- Jeffrey Pepper, American politician, member of the Michigan House of Representatives
- Jess Pepper, Scottish environmentalist, charity worker, founder of the Climate Café initiative
- Jim Pepper (1941–1992), American jazz musician
- John E. Pepper Jr. (born 1938), American businessman
- John Henry Pepper (1821–1900), English scientist, inventor, and lecturer
- John Pepper (1886–1938), Hungarian Communist politician
- John Pepper (cricketer) (1922–2007), English cricketer
- John Randolph Pepper (born 1958), American-Italian photographer
- Jordan Pepper (born 1996), South African racing driver
- Kathleen Daly Pepper (1898–1994), Canadian painter
- Kelly Pepper, English singer-songwriter
- Laurin Pepper (1930–2018), American Major League Baseball player
- Mary Sifton Pepper (born 1862), American journalist and translator
- Max Pepper (born 2001), English professional English rugby union footballer
- Michael Pepper (born 1942), British physicist working in semiconductor nanostructures
- Michael Pepper (cricketer) (born 1998), English cricketer
- Nigel Pepper (born 1968), English footballer
- Pamela Pepper (born 1964), American judge
- Patricia Pepper (1936–2006), British road cyclist
- Paul Pepper, TV and radio host
- Ray Pepper (1905–1996), American Major League Baseball outfielder
- Redd Pepper (born 1961), Barbadian-British voice actor
- Robert H. Pepper (1895–1968), lieutenant general of the United States Marine Corps
- Robert Pepper (born 1948), American specialist in communications policy
- Sam Pepper (born 1989), English YouTube personality
- Simon Pepper (1947–2018), Director of the World Wildlife Fund (Scotland)
- Simon Pepper (professor), emeritus professor of architecture at the University of Liverpool
- Stephen Pepper (1891–1972) American philosopher
- Sultan Pepper (1962–2009), American comedy writer
- Suzanne Pepper (1939–2022), Hong Kong–based American political scientist and journalist
- Tasmin Pepper (born 1990), South African female racing driver
- Taybor Pepper (born 1994), American football player
- Thelma Pepper (born 1920), Canadian artist
- Tom Pepper (born 1975), computer programmer
- Tony Pepper, American journalist & news anchor
- Wendy Pepper (1964–2017), American fashion designer
- William Pepper Jr. (1843–1898), Philadelphia physician, founder of the Free Library of Philadelphia
- William Francis Pepper (1937–2024), New York City lawyer
- Wolfgang Pepper (1910–1997), German journalist and politician
- Zoe Pepper, Australian filmmaker, director of the 2025 film Birthright

== Given name ==
- Pepper Binkley, American actress
- Pepper Constable (1914–1986), American football player
- Pepper D. Culpepper (born 1968), American political scientist
- Pepper Keenan (born 1967), American rock musician
- Pepper Ottman, American politician, member of the Wyoming House of Representative since 2021
- Pepper Schwartz (born 1945), American sociologist and sexologist
- Pepper Winters, Hong Kong-born American romance novelist

== Nickname ==
- Pepper Adams (1930–1986), American jazz saxophonist
- Pepper Bassett (1910–1980), American baseball player
- Pepper Daniels (1902–1978), American baseball player
- Pepper Jay (born 1949), American music producer, teacher, lecturer, actress, author, and attorney
- Pepper Johnson (born 1964), American football coach and player
- Pepper LaBeija (1948–2003), American drag queen and fashion designer
- Pepper Martin (1904–1965), American baseball player
- Pepper Martin (actor) (1936–2022), Canadian-American actor and professional wrestler
- Pepper MaShay (born 1953), American musician and singer-songwriter
- Pepper Morgan, American baseball player
- Pepper Paire (1924–2013), catcher and infielder from the All-American Girls Professional Baseball League
- Joe Peploski (1891–1972), American baseball player
- Pepper Petrella (1920–1991), American football player
- Pepper Rodgers (1931–2020), American football player and coach
- Pepper Rose, English singer
- Pepper Sharpe (1918–1997), American baseball player
- Pepper Somerset, vocalist in the American Industrial band My Life With The Thrill Kill Kult
- Pepper Wilson (1921–1988), American executive and manager

== Fictional characters ==
=== Given name or only name ===
- Mrs. Pepper, a female character in the Nick Jr. series Blue's Clues
- Pepper, title character of the 1975 film The Great Waldo Pepper, played by Robert Redford
- Pepper, in the musical Annie
- Pepper, a horse in the television series Horseland
- Pepper, in the musical Mamma Mia!
- Pepper, in the webcomic series Pepper&Carrot
- Pepper, in the book Good Omens
- Pepper, in the television series American Horror Story
- Sgt. Leann "Pepper" Anderson, the central character in the 1970s Police Woman TV series, played by Angie Dickinson
- Pepper Brooks, television commentator played by Jason Bateman in Dodgeball: A True Underdog Story
- Pepper Clark, a skunk in the cartoon Littlest Pet Shop
- Pepper Dennis, a news reporter in the television show Pepper Dennis played by Rebecca Romijn
- Pepper Ann Pearson, the protagonist and title character in Disney's 1997 animated series Pepper Ann
- Pepper Potts, Tony Stark's assistant and later lover in the Iron Man/Marvel Comics universe
- Pepper Roni, the central protagonist of the LEGO Island video game trilogy and a mascot for The LEGO Group in the late 1990s and early 2000s
- Pepper Saltzman, a guest character played by Nathan Lane in Modern Family
- Pepper Steiger, in Neighbours

=== Surname ===
- Floyd Pepper, a puppet character in The Muppet Show
- Hugo Pepper, 2006 children's book written by Paul Stewart, illustrated by Chris Riddell
- Suzy Pepper, character in Glee

== See also ==
- Fefer/Feffer, Feifer/Feiffer, Peifer/Peiffer, Pfeifer/Pfeiffer, Pfefer/Pfeffer, Pfeufer/Pfeuffer, Pheiffer, Phifer
- Paeper, Peper/Pepper/Peppers, Peperzak, Peeper, Pieper, Piepers, Pijper/Pijpers, Piper
- James E. Pepper, American whiskey brand
- Judge Pepper (disambiguation)
- Senator Pepper (disambiguation)
- Sgt. Pepper's Lonely Hearts Club Band (disambiguation)
- Pepper (disambiguation)
- Peppa Pig
