= Peppers (surname) =

Peppers (name) may refer to:

- Josh Peppers (born 1985), American professional basketball player
- Julius Peppers (born 1980), American NFL defensive end
- Debra Peppers, American television and radio host
- Jabrill Peppers (born 1995), American NFL safety/punt returner who plays for the New England Patriots

== See also ==
- Fefer/Feffer, Feifer/Feiffer, Peifer/Peiffer, Pfeifer/Pfeiffer, Pfefer/Pfeffer, Pfeufer/Pfeuffer, Pheiffer, Phifer
- Paeper, Peper/Pepper/Peppers, Peperzak, Peeper, Pieper, Piepers, Pijper/Pijpers, Piper
- The Peppers, a French male instrumental group
- Red Hot Chili Peppers, an American rock band
