= Pieper (surname) =

Pieper is a surname. Notable people with the surname include:

- Arlene Pieper, first woman to officially finish a marathon in the US - Pikes Peak Marathon in Manitou Springs, Colorado, 1959
- August Pieper (disambiguation), multiple people
- Bradley G. Pieper (born 1942), American businessman and politician
- Cornelia Pieper, German politician of the liberal Free Democratic Party (FDP)
- Franz Pieper, Confessional Lutheran theologian
- Hein Pieper, Dutch Catholic theologian and politician
- Jens Pieper, German archer
- Josef Pieper German Catholic philosopher
- Kade Pieper (born 2005), American football player
- Markus Pieper German politician and Member of the European Parliament for North Rhine-Westphalia
- Michael Pieper (born 1946), Swiss billionaire businessman
- Pat Pieper, Chicago Cubs field (public address) announcer
- Paul C. Pieper (born 1972), American guitarist and composer
- Roel Pieper, Dutch IT-entrepreneur
- Stefan Pieper, German ski jumper

== See also ==
- Fefer/Feffer, Feifer/Feiffer, Peifer/Peiffer, Pfeifer/Pfeiffer, Pfefer/Pfeffer, Pfeufer/Pfeuffer, Pheiffer, Phifer
- Paeper, Peper/Pepper/Peppers, Peperzak, Peeper, Pieper, Piepers, Pijper/Pijpers, Piper
