= Pijpers =

Pijpers or Pijper is a Dutch occupational surname. A pijper was the general name for a woodwind player (compare English "piper", which has the same pronunciation.) People with this surname include:

- Arno Pijpers (born 1959), Dutch football coach
- Harmke Pijpers (born 1946), Dutch journalist, presenter and voiceover
- Koen Pijpers (born 1969), Dutch field hockey player
- René Pijpers (1917–1944), Dutch footballer

Pijper

- Fredrik Pijper (1859–1926), Dutch theologian and historian
- Theo Pijper (born 1980), Dutch motorcycle speedway rider
- Willem Pijper (1894–1947), Dutch composer, music critic and music teacher

== See also ==
- Fefer/Feffer, Feifer/Feiffer, Peifer/Peiffer, Pfeifer/Pfeiffer, Pfefer/Pfeffer, Pfeufer/Pfeuffer, Pheiffer, Phifer
- Paeper, Peper/Pepper/Peppers, Peperzak, Peeper, Pieper, Piepers, Pijper/Pijpers, Piper, Pyper
- Pipers (disambiguation)
