= Peper =

Peper is a surname. Notable people with the name include:

- Bram Peper (1940–2022), Dutch politician of the Labour Party
- Ferdinand Peper (born 1961), Dutch theoretical computer scientist
- Mirjam Peper, birth name of Mirjam de Koning (born 1969), Dutch Paralympic swimmer (born 1969), Dutch paraplegic swimmer
- Roberto Peper (1913–1999), Argentine swimmer, competed in the 1932 Summer Olympics
- Susana Peper (born 1946), Argentine swimmer
- Tim Peper (born 1980), American film, television and stage actor

== See also ==
- Fefer/Feffer, Feifer/Feiffer, Peifer/Peiffer, Pfeifer/Pfeiffer, Pfefer/Pfeffer, Pfeufer/Pfeuffer, Pheiffer, Phifer
- Paeper, Peper/Pepper, Peperzak, Peeper, Pieper, Piepers, Pijper/Pijpers, Piper
- Peper Harow, rural village and civil parish in Surrey, England
