= Peiffer =

Peiffer is a surname. Notable people with the surname include:

- Arnd Peiffer (born 1987), German biathlete
- Bernard Peiffer (1922–1976), French jazz pianist, composer, and teacher
- Dan Peiffer (born 1951), American football player

== See also ==
- Fefer/Feffer, Feifer/Feiffer, Peifer/Peiffer, Pfeifer/Pfeiffer, Pfefer/Pfeffer, Pfeufer/Pfeuffer, Pheiffer, Phifer
- Paeper, Peper/Pepper, Peperzak, Peeper, Pieper, Piepers, Pijper/Pijpers, Piper
