= Pfeuffer =

Origin
- Language: German language
- Meaning: Pepper, piper

Other names
- Alternative spelling: Pfiffer, Phifer, Pfeuffer, Pfeiffer, Pfeifer, Pieper, Feifer, and Peifer

Pfeuffer is an occupational surname of Franconian German and/or Ashkenazi Jewish origin, a variant of Pfeiffer.

== Notable people ==
- Aharon Pfeuffer (1949–1993), South African Orthodox Rabbi and posek
- Alan J. Pfeuffer, American lawyer
- Carl Pfeufer (1910–1980), American comic book artist
- Christoph Carl Pfeuffer (1801–1861), German sculptor
- Hartmut Pfeuffer (1949–2018), German visual artist
- Johann Michael Pfeuffer (1742–1805), German sculptor
- Ludwig Pfeuffer (1924–2000), better known as Yehuda Amichai, Israeli poet and author

== See also ==
- Fefer/Feffer, Feifer/Feiffer, Peifer/Peiffer, Pfeifer/Pfeiffer, Pfefer/Pfeffer, Pfeufer/Pfeuffer, Pheiffer, Phifer
- Paeper, Peiper, Peper/Pepper/Peppers, Peperzak, Peeper, Pieper, Piepers, Pijper/Pijpers, Piper, Pyper
