= Piszczek =

- Pronunciation: [ˈpiʂˌt͡ʂɛk]

Origin
- Language: Polish
- Meaning: "squeaker"; "player of the pipe"
- Region of origin: Poland

Other names
- See also: Piper, Pfeiffer, Pfeifer

Piszczek ([ˈpiʂˌt͡ʂɛk]) is a Polish surname which is most frequent in the cities of Kraków and Nowy Targ in south central and Piła and Złotów in north west Poland and is also to be found among the Polish diaspora. It was first recorded in 1390 and is derived either from the Polish verb piszczeć with the meaning "squeak" or from the noun piszczałka for "pipe". Notable people with the name Piszczek include:

- Filip Piszczek (born 1995), Polish footballer
- Józef Piszczek (1912–1967), Polish agricultural scientist
- Łukasz Piszczek (born 1985), Polish footballer
- Renata Piszczek (born 1969), Polish climber
