= Piper (surname) =

Piper is a surname of German, English and Scandinavian origin, derived from the Old English "pipere" and the Old Norse that also means beauty and purity"pipari", meaning "flute" or "fluteplayer", originating from long pepper in Indo-Aryan languages. Notable people with the surname include:

== Academia ==
- Charles Piper (1867–1926), American botanist and agriculturalist
- Franciszek Piper (born 1941), Polish historian
- James A. Piper (1947–2023), New Zealander-Australian physicist
- Martha Piper, President of the University of British Columbia
- Otto Piper (1841–1921), German architectural historian
- Ross Piper (fl. 1998–present) British zoologist

== Art and design ==
- Adrian Piper (born 1948), American conceptual artist and philosopher
- Christian Piper (1941–2019), German artist
- Edward Piper (1938–1990), English painter
- John Piper (artist) (1903–1992), English artist
- Keith Piper (artist) (born 1960), British artist
- Lloyd Piper (1923–1983), Australian cartoonist
- Luke Piper (born 1966), English painter, son of Edward Piper
- Rose Piper (1917–2005), American artist
- Tom Piper (born 1964), British theatre designer

== Business ==
- Christina Piper (1673–1752), Swedish countess, landowner and entrepreneur, wife of the politician Carl Piper (see below)
- Odessa Piper (born 1953), American restaurateur
- William T. Piper (1881–1970), American airplane manufacturer, founder of Piper Aircraft

== Music ==
- Billie Piper (born 1982), English singer, dancer and actress
- Myfanwy Piper (1911–1997), English art critic and librettist
- Randy Piper (born 1953), American rock guitarist and songwriter

== Performing arts ==
- Ailsa Piper (born 1959), Australian actress, playwright, and director
- Arón Piper (born 1997), Spanish-German actor and singer-songwriter
- Billie Piper (born 1982), English singer, dancer, and actress
- Frederick Piper (1902–1979), English actor
- Gordon Piper (1932–2004), Australian actor, theatre director, and scriptwriter
- Jacki Piper (born 1946), British actor
- Jason Piper, English voice actor and ballet dancer
- "Rowdy" Roddy Piper (1954–2015), Canadian professional wrestler and actor
- Sally Gifford Piper, Canadian actress, usually credited as Sally Gifford
- Tim Piper, Australian filmmaker

== Politics ==
- August J. Piper (1864–1945), American politician
- Carl Piper (1657–1716), Swedish politician
- Greg Piper (born 1957), Australian politician
- Pat Piper (politician) (1934–2016), American politician
- Sue Piper (born 1951), retired New Zealand unionist and local politician
- Wendy Piper, American politician
- William Piper (1774–1852) American politician
- William Adam Piper (1826–1899), American politician
- William G. Piper (1906–1976), American politician

== Sport ==
- Carly Piper (born 1983), American former swimmer
- Cherie Piper (born 1981), Canadian retired ice hockey player
- David Piper (racing driver) (born 1930), British former racing driver
- Donald Piper (basketball) (1911–1963) American basketball player
- Jim Piper (born 1981), Australian swimmer
- Jim Piper (footballer) (1884–1949), Australian rules footballer
- Keith Piper (cricketer) (born 1969), former Warwickshire wicketkeeper
- Keith W. Piper (1921–1997), American football coach
- Kenny Piper (born 1998), American baseball player
- Matt Piper (born 1981), English footballer
- Nesta Piper (born 1982), Montserratian cricketer
- Nicky Piper (born 1966), Welsh retired boxer
- Norman Piper (born 1948), English former footballer
- Oliver Piper (1884–1933), Welsh-born Irish rugby union player
- Pat Pieper (1886–1974), American sports announcer

== Writing ==
- Ailsa Piper (born 1959), Australian actress, playwright, and director
- David Piper (curator) (1918–1990), British museum curator and author
- Evelyn Piper, pen name of Merriam Modell (1908–1994), American author of short stories, suspense and pulp fiction
- H. Beam Piper (1904–1964), American science fiction author
- John Piper (theologian) (born 1946), American Calvinist Baptist preacher and author
- Kelsey Piper (born 1992), American journalist
- Michael Collins Piper (born 1960), American political writer, conspiracy theorist, and talk radio host

== Other people ==
- Arthur William Piper (1865–1936), judge of the Supreme Court of South Australia
- Carl Edward Vilhelm Piper (1820–1891), Swedish nobleman and diplomat
- Earl S. Piper (1905–1979), U.S. Marine Corps Brigadier general
- Hedda Piper (1746–1812), Swedish courtier
- Jill Piper (1959/1960–1976), American murder victim
- John Piper (broadcaster), BBC radio host
- (John) Piper (c.1810–?), Indigenous Australian explorer
- John Piper (military officer) (1773–1851), Scottish-born officer, lieutenant-governor of Norfolk Island
- Katie Piper (born 1983), English former model and TV presenter who suffered an acid attack to the face
- Leonora Piper (1857–1950), American trance medium
- Peter Piper (Royal Navy officer) (1913–1995), Second World War officer
- Reg Piper (born 1942), Australian former Anglican bishop
- Robert Piper, Australian United Nations official
- Sophie Piper (1757–1816), Swedish countess
- Stina Piper (1734–1800), Swedish countess

== Douple surnames ==
- Heidemarie Stefanyshyn-Piper (born 1963), American astronaut
- Marty Willson-Piper (born 1958), English guitarist

== See also ==
- Fefer/Feffer, Feifer/Feiffer, Peifer/Peiffer, Pfeifer/Pfeiffer, Pfefer/Pfeffer, Pfeufer/Pfeuffer, Pheiffer, Phifer
- Paeper, Peiper, Peper/Pepper/Peppers, Peperzak, Peeper, Pieper, Piepers, Pijper/Pijpers, Piper, Pyper
