= Pfefer =

Pfefer is a surname. Notable people with the surname include:

- Jack Pfefer (1894–1974), Russian-born American wrestling promoter
- Mojżesz Pfefer (1856–1919), Polish industrialist, landowner, philanthropist, and social activist

== See also ==
- Fefer/Feffer, Feifer/Feiffer, Peifer/Peiffer, Pfeifer/Pfeiffer, Pfefer/Pfeffer, Pfeufer/Pfeuffer, Pheiffer, Phifer
- Paeper, Peper/Pepper, Peperzak, Peeper, Pieper, Piepers, Pijper/Pijpers, Piper
