= Peffer =

Peffer may refer to:

- Jordy Peffer (b. 1996), Belgian footballer
- Nathaniel Peffer (1890, New York City - 1964), American researcher of Far East problems
- William A. Peffer (1831–1912), United States Senator from Kansas

== See also ==
- Pfeffer, Feffer
- Pfeffermann
- Pfefferbaum, Pfefferberg
