= Peifer =

Peifer is a surname. Notable people with the surname include:

- Mark Peifer, American biologist
- Michael Peifer (born 1968), American politician
- Nicolas Peifer (born 1990), French wheelchair tennis player

== See also ==
- Fefer/Feffer, Feifer/Feiffer, Peifer/Peiffer, Pfeifer/Pfeiffer, Pfefer/Pfeffer, Pfeufer/Pfeuffer, Pheiffer, Phifer
- Paeper, Peper/Pepper, Peperzak, Peeper, Pieper, Piepers, Pijper/Pijpers, Piper
