= Phifer =

Phifer is a surname. Notable people with the surname include:

- James Reese Phifer (1916–1998), American businessman and philanthropist
- Mekhi Phifer (born 1974), American actor
- Roman Phifer (born 1968), American football player
- Thomas Phifer (born 1953), American architect

== See also ==
- Fefer/Feffer, Feifer/Feiffer, Peifer/Peiffer, Pfeifer/Pfeiffer, Pfefer/Pfeffer, Pfeufer/Pfeuffer, Pheiffer, Phifer
- Paeper, Peper/Pepper, Peperzak, Peeper, Pieper, Piepers, Pijper/Pijpers, Piper
