= Ludger tom Ring the Elder =

German painter

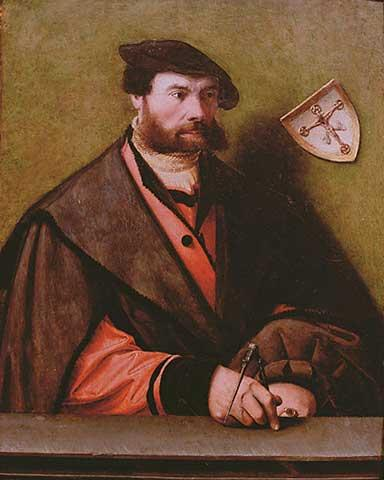
Self-portrait (1541)

Ludger tom Ring the Elder (c.1496, Münster - 3 April 1547, Münster) was a German painter, engraver and decorative artist.

== Biography ==
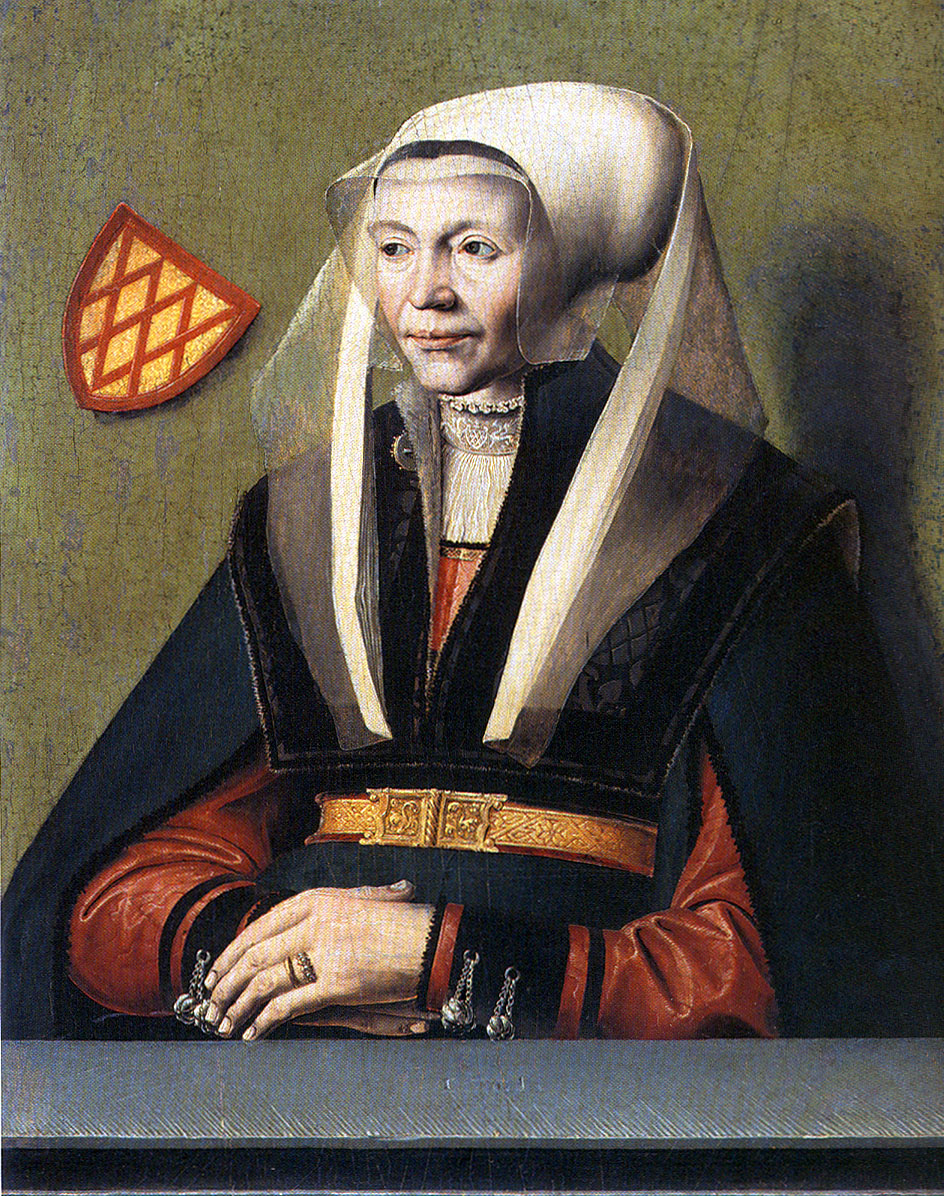
Portrait of his wife, Anna

He was trained, at least partly, in the Netherlands and had established himself in Münster by 1520. That same year, he married Anna Rorup. The following year, he took the engraver, Heinrich Aldegrever, then only nineteen years old, into his studio as a partner. Sometime before 1530, he became a member of the Painters' Guild.

He left the city in 1533, during the Münster rebellion by the Anabaptists, and returned after order had been restored. Much of his work immediately following his return involved restoring the works damaged or destroyed during the rebellion.

In addition to murals and decorative works, he was widely respected as a portrait painter. He also worked for the printer and typographer, Dietrich Tzwyvel and may have helped decorate the astronomical clock that Tzwyvel designed for the Cathedral.

He and Anna had eight children altogether; including three who became painters: Hermann tom Ring, Ludger tom Ring the Younger and Herbert tom Ring (1530 - 1593).

He and his wife both died during an epidemic of the plague on Palm Sunday in 1547.

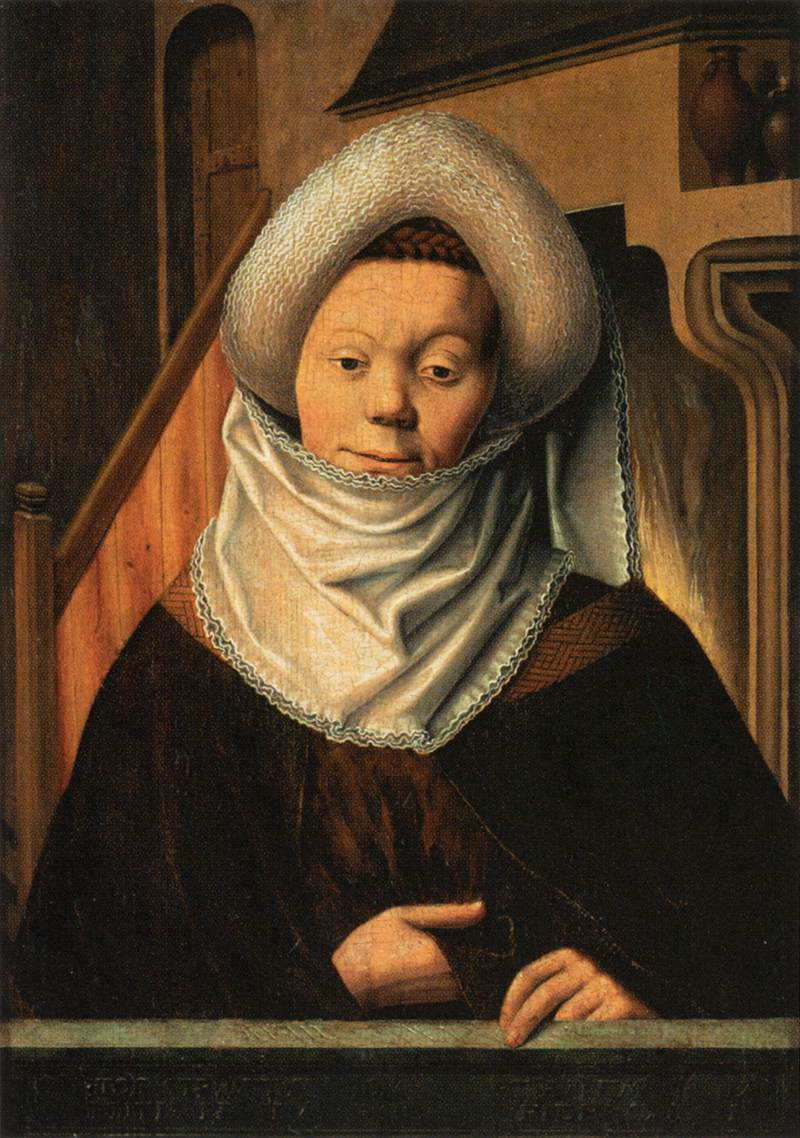
The Delphic Sibyl

=== Works ===
One of his largest projects involved a tableau of fifteen sibyls and prophets who foretold the coming of Christ. They were originally displayed in Münster Cathedral. Six have survived. Five are in museums in Münster. The Delphic Sibyl is in the Louvre.

Many experts suggest that these were actually copies made by Ring after the original series by Robert Campin (from 1435) had been damaged or destroyed by the Anabaptists. Around 1570, his son Hermann repeated the series, with some variations.

Some of his works were originally attributed to Hans Holbein the Younger.

== Further reading/sources ==
- Angelika Lorenz (2003). "tom Ring, Ludger der Ältere". Neue Deutsche Biographie (in German). Vol. 21. Berlin: Duncker & Humblot. pp. 629–630. (full text online).
- Theodor Riewerts, Paul Pieper: Die Maler tom Ring. Ludger der Ältere, Hermann, Ludger der Jüngere (= Westfälische Kunst). Deutscher Kunstverlag, München/Berlin 1955.
- Franz Weinitz (1889). "Ring, tom" . Allgemeine Deutsche Biographie (in German). Vol. 28. Leipzig: Duncker & Humblot. pp. 630–631.
