= John Pepper (disambiguation) =

John Pepper (1886–1938) was a Hungarian-Jewish Communist politician.

John Pepper may also refer to:

- John E. Pepper Jr., American businessman
- John Henry Pepper (1821–1900), British scientist and inventor
- John Randolph Pepper (born 1958), photographer and theatre director
- John Pepper (English MP) (1537–1603), English politician
- John Pepper (cricketer) (1922–2007), English cricketer
