= Feiffer =

Feiffer is a surname. Notable people with the surname include:

- Halley Feiffer, American actress, playwright, TV writer and showrunner,
- Jules Feiffer (1929–2025), American cartoonist and author
- Peter Feiffer (1934–2017), German researcher and inventor in agricultural science

== Fictional characters ==
- Carol Feiffer and Redwood Feiffer from the Americna novel Great Circle
- Harry Feiffer from the Yellowthread Street series of novels by Australian writer William Leonard Marshall.

== See also ==
- Fefer/Feffer, Feifer/Feiffer, Peifer/Peiffer, Pfeifer/Pfeiffer, Pfefer/Pfeffer, Pfeufer/Pfeuffer, Pheiffer, Phifer
- Paeper, Peper/Pepper, Peperzak, Peeper, Pieper, Piepers, Pijper/Pijpers, Piper
