= Pfeifer =

Pfeifer (/ˈfaɪfər/ FY-fər, German: [ˈpfaɪfɐ]) is a German-language occupational surname meaning "whistler" or "pipe-" or "fife-player" and etymologically akin to English Piper and Fifer; other spellings include Pfeiffer. The spelling Pfeifer may refer to:

- People:
  - Anton Pfeifer (born 1937), German politician
  - Carl Ferdinand Pfeifer (1915–2001), United States Navy officer and aide to Presidents Harry S. Truman and Dwight D. Eisenhower
  - Felix Pfeifer (1871–1945), German sculptor and medallist
  - George Pfeifer (born 1955), former head men's basketball coach at the University of Idaho
  - Hellmuth Pfeifer (1894–1945), German general who commanded the 65. Infantrie Division during World War II
  - Jörg Pfeifer (born 1952), East German athlete who competed mainly in the 100 metres
  - Joseph L. Pfeifer (1892–1974), United States Representative from New York
  - Karl Pfeifer, (1928–2023), Austrian journalist
  - Louis Fred Pfeifer (1876–1917), private in the United States Marine Corps who received the Medal of Honor
  - Manuel Pfeifer (born 1999), Austrian football player
  - Marcuse Pfeifer (1936–2020), American gallerist
  - Melanie Pfeifer (born 1986), German slalom canoeist who has competed since the late 2000s
  - Michael David Pfeifer (born 1937), Roman Catholic bishop of the Diocese of San Angelo
  - Paul Pfeifer (born 1942), American politician of the Ohio Republican party
  - Philip Pfeifer (born 1992), American baseball player
  - Rolf Pfeifer (born 1947), professor of computer science at the Department of Informatics, University of Zurich
  - Scott Pfeifer (born 1977), Canadian curler from Sherwood Park who plays out of the Saville Sports Centre in Edmonton
  - Sílvia Pfeifer (born 1958), Brazilian actress
  - Steve Pfeifer (born 1938), American racing driver
  - Viktor Pfeifer (born 1987), Austrian figure skater
  - Will Pfeifer (born 1967), American comic book writer
  - Wolfgang Pfeifer (1935–2026), German footballer
  - Wolfgang Pfeifer (etymologist) (1922–2020), German scholar and linguist
- Communities:
  - Pfeifer, Kansas, unincorporated community in Ellis County, Kansas, United States

== See also ==
- Fefer/Feffer, Feifer/Feiffer, Peifer/Peiffer, Pfeifer/Pfeiffer, Pfefer/Pfeffer, Pfeufer/Pfeuffer, Pheiffer, Phifer
- Paeper, Peper/Pepper, Peperzak, Peeper, Pieper, Piepers, Pijper/Pijpers, Piper
- Pfeifer Broz. Music, musical consultant and production team (Jeffrey & Robert Pfeifer)
- Pfeifer Zeliska .600 Nitro Express revolver, Austrian single-action revolver produced by Pfeifer firearms
