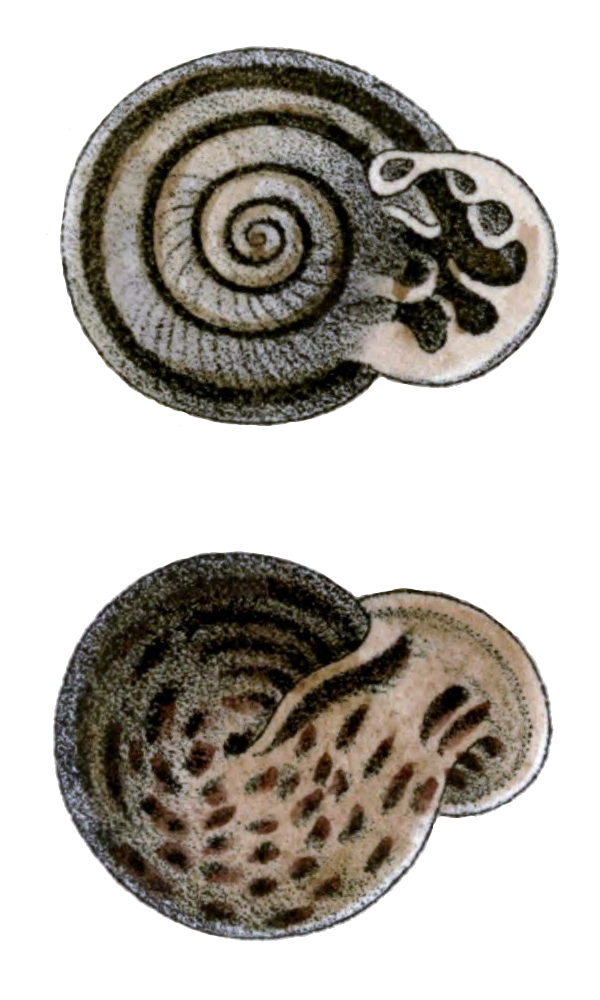
- A colored drawing of an adult shell of Ringicella carinatum

Scientific classification
- Kingdom: Animalia
- Phylum: Mollusca
- Class: Gastropoda
- Order: Stylommatophora
- Family: Tomogeridae
- Genus: Ringicella
- Species: R. carinatum

Binomial name
- Ringicella carinatum (Pfeiffer, 1853)

Synonyms
- Anostoma carinatum Pfeiffer, 1853

= Ringicella carinatum =

Species of gastropod

Ringicella carinatum is a species of air-breathing land snail, a terrestrial pulmonate gastropod mollusk in the subfamily Bulimulinae, in the family Tomogeridae.

It is considered a synonym of Anostoma carinatum L. Pfeiffer, 1853

== Distribution ==
This species occurs in Brazil. Pilsbry (1901) mentioned Ringicella carinatum as also occurring in Colombia, in high forests of the Magdalena River basin at 1830 m (6000 feet) above sea level, but Vera Ardila (2008) considers the presence of the species in Colombia to be doubtful.

== Shell description ==
The shell of this species has a long basal suture. It is conoid-lenticular, rather solid, acutely carinate. It is pale in color, narrowly banded with chestnut above the keel and at the suture. The spire is shortly conoid in shape. The shell has 5 whorls which are rather flattened; the upper ones are striatulate, the final whorl with irregular and waved rib-striae. The base of the shell is convex, spotted with chestnut, scrobiculate in front.

The shell aperture follows the slope of the spire, is semicircular, and is contracted by six strong, curved lamellae. The peristome is white, broadly expanded and reflexed. The right margin of the peristome is provided with a large foramen at its insertion point.

The width of adult shells is 24.5 mm, the height is 13 mm.
