= Charles Pepper =

Charles Pepper may refer to:

- Charles T. Pepper (1830–1903), American physician and surgeon
- Charles Pepper (cricketer) (1875–1917), English cricketer
