= James Piper =

James or Jim Piper may refer to:

- Jim Piper (born 1981), Australian breastroke swimmer
- Sir James Piper, character in Sunset at Blandings
- James A. Piper (1947–2023), New Zealand/Australian physicist
- Jim Piper (footballer) (1884–1949), Australian rules footballer
