= Piper (given name) =

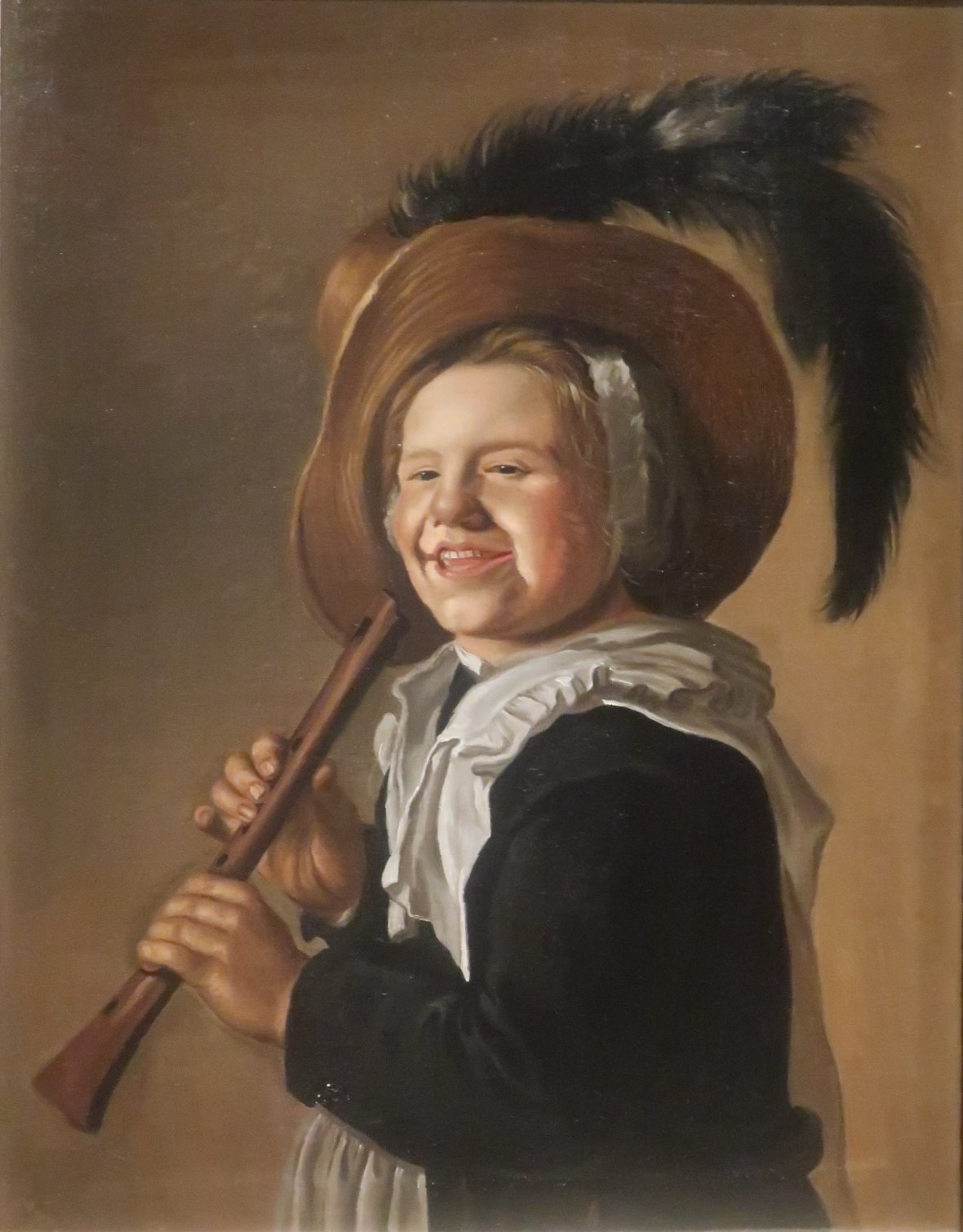
- Girl with a Recorder after Jan Miense Molenaer, c. 1650.
- Pronunciation: PYE-pur
- Gender: Primarily feminine

Origin
- Origin: English
- Meaning: “piper”

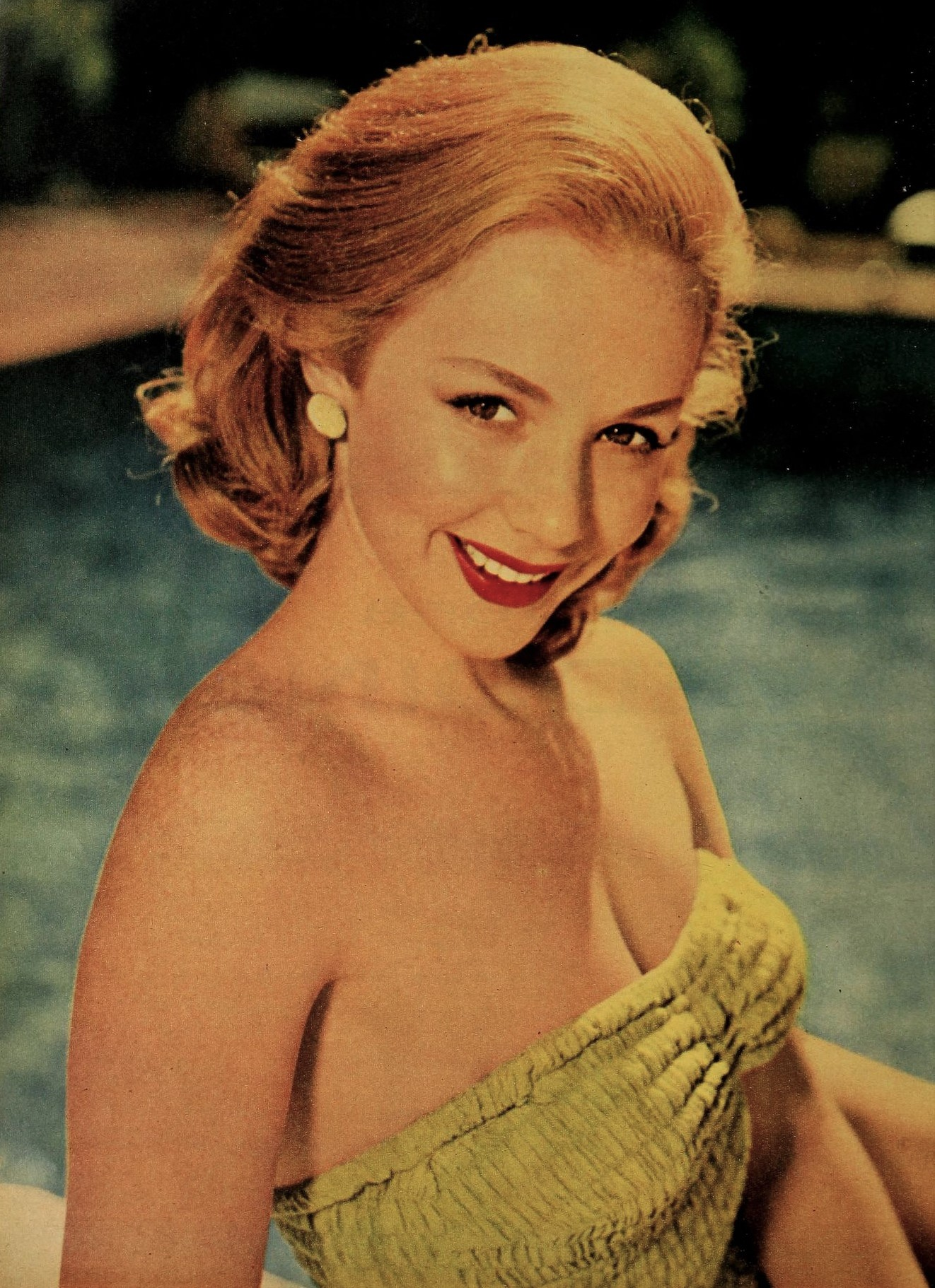
American actress Piper Laurie (born Rosetta Jacobs; 1932–2023), pictured in 1954.

Piper is an English given name meaning "piper". It is a transferred use of the surname, which originated as an occupational name in England in the Middle Ages for a pipe player. The given name increased in use for girls in the mid-20th century in the Anglosphere due to the American actress Piper Laurie, who was born Rosetta Jacobs and adopted her stage name in 1949. The name first appeared on popularity charts in English-speaking countries in the late 1990s and early 2000s after the character Piper Halliwell played by actress Holly Marie Combs appeared on the popular American television series Charmed, which aired from 1998 to 2006.

== Women ==
- Piper Campbell (born 1965), American diplomat
- Piper Curda (born 1997), American actress and singer
- Piper Dellums, American author and public speaker
- Piper Gilles (born 1992), American-Canadian ice dancer
- Piper Harris (born 2000), American child actress
- Piper Kerman (born 1969), American memoirist and convicted money launderer and drug trafficker, author of Orange Is the New Black: My Year in a Women's Prison
- Piper Madison (born 2002), American singer
- Piper O'Neill (born 1983), American beauty queen, model, presenter and charity worker
- Piper Palin (born 2001), daughter of American politician Sarah Palin
- Piper Perabo (born 1976), American actress
- Piper Reese (born 2000), American child reporter and actress
- Piper Rockelle (born 2007), American child influencer and Onlyfans model

=== Stage name ===
- Piper Laurie (born Rosetta Jacobs; 1932–2023), American actress
- Piper Niven (born Kimberly Benson in 1991), Scottish professional wrestler

== Men ==
=== Nickname ===
- Lorenzo “Piper” Davis (1917–1997), American Negro league baseball player

== Fiction ==
=== Comics ===
- Piper (Morlock), in the Marvel Universe
- Piper (Mutate), in the Marvel Universe

=== Television ===
- Piper Chapman, lead character in the American comedy-drama series Orange Is the New Black
- Piper Halliwell, one of the lead characters on Charmed
- Piper Hart, Henry Hart's little sister in the Nickelodeon series Henry Danger
- Piper Willis, in the Australian soap opera Neighbours
- Piper Willowbrook, an elf in the Nickelodeon series Mysticons
- Mr. Piper, host on the 1960s Canadian television show of the same name
- Piper, an artificial intelligence in Emergence
- Piper, a tactical expert in Storm Hawks
- Piper O'Possum a Nick Jr. mascot.
- Piper, a young trainee steam engine.

=== Other ===
- Piper, a character in the 2012 American independent feature movie California Solo
- Piper McLean, a daughter of Aphrodite and one of the seven in Rick Riordan's The Heroes of Olympus
- Piper Pinwheeler, a character in the 2005 animated film Robots
- Piper Wheel, a character in Zenless Zone Zero
- Piper, a character in a sidequest in the video game Paper Mario: Color Splash
- Piper Wright, a reporter in the video game Fallout 4
- Piper Willowbrook, a main character of Mysticons
- Piper de la Prim, a playable character in the mobile game Brawl Stars
- Piper, a character from Bendy and the Ink Machine
- The Piper, a character in The Keys to the Kingdom book series

== See also ==
- Pyper
