= Joe Axelson =

American basketball executive (1927–2008)

- Born: Joseph A. Axelson; December 25, 1927; Peoria, Illinois, U.S.
- Died: May 31, 2008 (aged 80); Coronado, California, U.S.
- Known for: General Manager of the Cincinnati Royals / Kansas City (Omaha) / Sacramento Kings

Joseph A. Axelson (December 25, 1927 – May 31, 2008) was an American sports executive who served as general manager of Cincinnati Royals/Kansas City Kings/Sacramento Kings from 1969 to 1979 and again from 1982 to 1988. He played a role in the franchise's relocation from Cincinnati to Kansas City–Omaha, and then on to Sacramento, California.

== Early life and career ==
Axelson was born on December 25, 1927, in Peoria, Illinois. He grew up in Clinton, Illinois, where his father was the high school basketball coach from 1928 to 1947. Axelson's first job came at the age of 15 when he began working as a dispatcher for the Illinois Central Railroad. In 1947, Axelson graduated from Officer Candidate School at Fort Benning. From 1947 to 1949, was the officer in charge of the Armed Forces Radio Service station in Whittier, Alaska. He was then stationed at Fort Gordon, where he coached the base's basketball and baseball teams. While stationed here, From 1954 to 1956, Axelson attended Georgia Teachers College (now Georgia Southern University), where he also served as sports publicity director and edited The George-Anne. After a one-year stint as the sports publicist at Furman University, Axelson returned to GTC as the school's public relations director. He also hosted a twice-daily sports broadcast on WWNS. In 1960, Axelson left Georgia Southern to become sports director of WPDQ in Jacksonville, Florida. In 1961, Axelson became the publicity director of the National Association of Intercollegiate Athletics. Three years later he became the NAIA's assistant executive secretary.

== Cincinnati Royals ==
On April 16, 1969, the Cincinnati Royals hired Axelson as the team's new general manager. The Royals, who were suffering from declining attendance, chose Axelson based on his reputation as a promoter with the NAIA. According to owner Max Jacobs, Axelson would be in charge of promoting the team while former GM Pepper Wilson, who was promoted to vice president, would handle player development, contracts, player transactions, and scouting. However, Wilson soon left the team to become the public relations director for the Cincinnati Zoo, leaving Axelson in charge. Soon after his hiring, Axelson commissioned a study on relocating the Royals to Kansas City, Missouri, where Axelson had worked with the NAIA and the Jacobs family controlled concessions.

In an effort to increase attendance, Axelson added 41-year old head coach Bob Cousy to the roster. Axelson traded Bill Dinwiddie and a draft pick to the Boston Celtics in exchange for Cousy's playing rights. That same year, Axelson dealt Jerry Lucas and Adrian Smith, whose style of play was not suited to Cousy's fast-break offense, to the San Francisco Warriors in separate trades. The Royals received Jim King and Bill Turner in exchange for Lucas and a 1970 2nd round pick in exchange for Smith. The team finished with a 36–46 record, their worst since the 1960–61 season. During the offseason, Axelson traded star Oscar Robertson for Flynn Robinson and Charlie Paulk, both of whom were not effective with the Royals. One game into the 1970–71 season, Axelson traded the team's third leading scorer from the previous season, Fred Foster, and Connie Dierking to the Philadelphia 76ers in exchange for Darrall Imhoff. Due to the loss of many of their popular players, the Royals only drew 4,600 fans to their 1970–71 home opener. Four days later the team's attendance dropped to 2,500.

== Kansas City–Omaha Kings ==
For the 1971–72 season, the Royals averaged only 3,357 fans. On March 14, 1972, Axelson announced that the team planned to move to Kansas City, Missouri. The team would play between 21 and 26 of their 41 home games in Kansas City with the remainder to be played in either Omaha, Nebraska, or St. Louis, Missouri, due to a lack of available dates at Municipal Auditorium. When the team moved to Kansas City, Axelson was promoted to team president. Following the King's first season in Kansas City, Axelson won the first NBA Executive of the Year Award. On June 25, 1973, the Jacobs family sold the Kings for $5 million to Missouri Valley Pro Sports, Inc., a group of Kansas City businessmen headed by Ray Evans and H. Paul Rosenberg that also included Axelson. On October 16, 1973, Axelson received a three-year contract extension. In 1975, the NAIA chose Axelson to serve as its executive secretary, however he was unable to get out of his contract with the Kings and had to turn down the job. Magic Johnson had strongly considered leaving Michigan State after the 1977–78 season to join the NBA, but after meeting with Axelson he changed his mind, because the Kings were in line to have a high draft pick and Magic was completely unimpressed by Axelson and considered the notion of being chosen by him in the 1978 draft a non-starter. On July 11, 1979, Axelson announced that he would become the NBA's vice president for operations. He remained with the Kings into the start of the 1979–80 season to assist the club with its move from Kemper Arena to Municipal Auditorium following the collapse of Kemper Arena's roof.

On April 30, 1982, The Kansas City Kings announced that Axelson would return as president and general manager on a five-year contract. On June 17, the Kings were sold to New York City businessmen Irwin Feiner, Al Steinberg, and B. Gerald Cantor. The team was sold again on June 9, 1983, to a group of Sacramento businessmen. On October 31, 1984, Axelson announced that the Kings would not renew a five-year option on their lease of Kemper Arena due to a dispute with Kansas City over some of the lease provisions. Although the city officials made efforts to improve the lease, the Kings announced on January 21, 1985, that the team had asked the NBA for permission to relocate to Sacramento, citing revenue and attendance problems. The Kings final game in Kansas City was on April 14, 1985. During the game, Kings fans targeted their anger at Axelson. Hundreds of spectators wore masks resembling him, other fans attacked a dummy made to look like him, and another fan had a sign that said “Kill Axelson”.

== Sacramento Kings ==
The Kings’ first season in Sacramento was a box office success. They were the first team in NBA history to sell out every home game in their inaugural season, finished fifth overall in ticket sales, and had the third highest local television ratings. However, on the court, the Kings went 37–45. In 1987, the Kings attempted to become more competitive by hiring Bill Russell as head coach. Russell's seven-year contract stipulated that he would become general manager after two seasons and succeed Axelson as president when Axelson retired. Russell would also be able to purchase a percentage of the team if it went public. Russell had not coached since an unsuccessful stint with the Seattle SuperSonics ended 1977. On March 7, 1988, with the Kings sitting at 17–41, Russell was removed as head coach and was named vice president in charge of basketball operations. Axelson was reassigned to the position of vice president in charge of business operations.

== Personal life and death ==
Axelson retired to Coronado, California, in 1990. A lifelong Chicago Cubs fan, Axelson spent his later years writing a Cubs newsletter - Between the Vines. He died on May 31, 2008, at his home in Coronado, aged 80.
