= August Pieper =

August Pieper may refer to:

- August Pieper (architect) (1844–1891), German architect
- August Pieper (theologian) (1866–1942), German Roman Catholic theologian
