= Kielce Synagogue =

Coordinates: 50°52′28″N 20°37′58″E

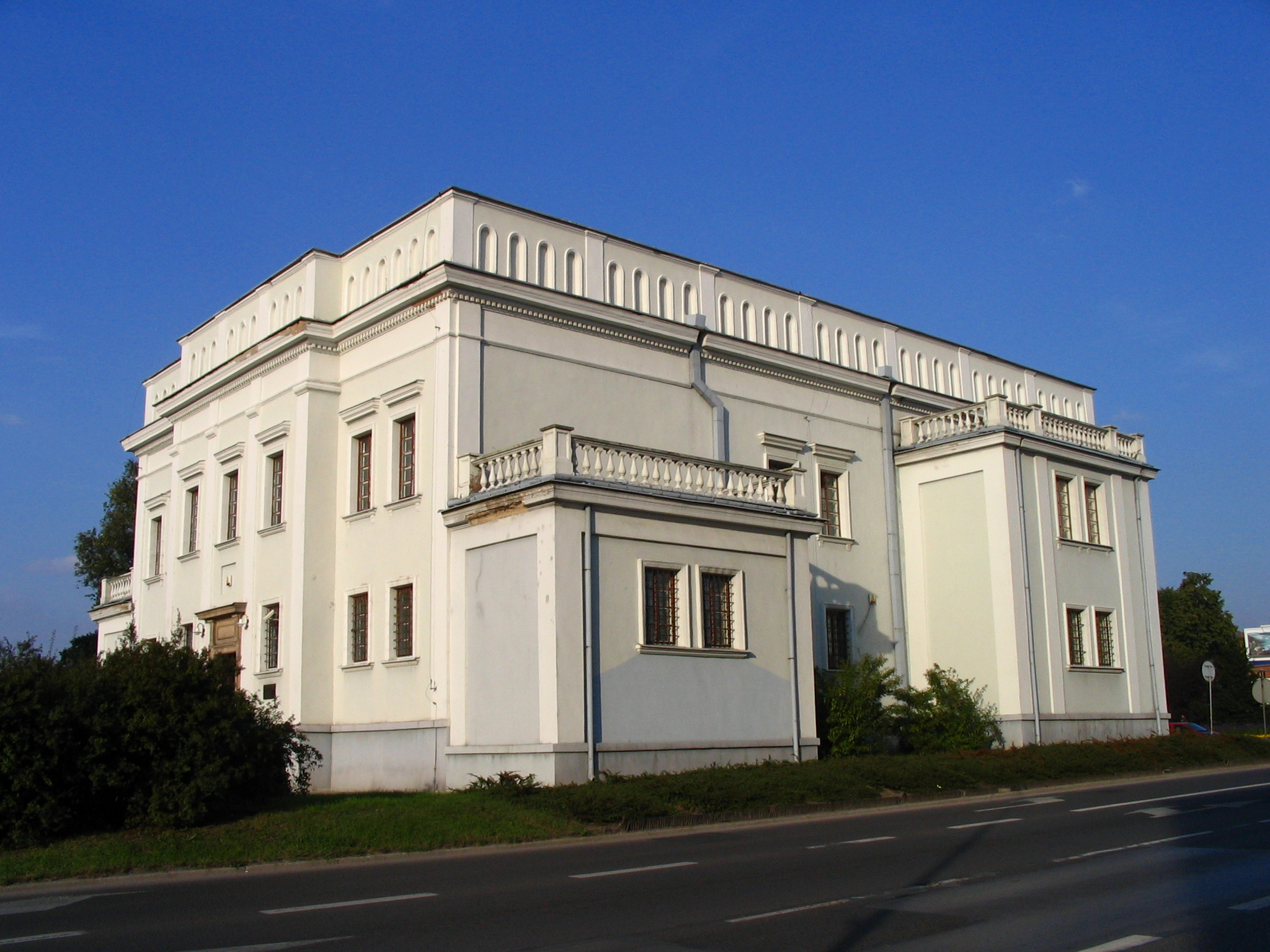
Kielce Synagogue

The Kielce Synagogue was a synagogue in Kielce, Poland. Designed by Stanisław Szpakowski, it was built between 1901 and 1903 on the grounds donated by Mojżesz Pfefer. The temple was desecrated by the Nazis during World War II, and turned into a prison and storage facility for stolen Jewish property. After WW2, the building stood abandoned from 1945 to 1951, when communist state of Poland appropriated the building for the needs of the State Archives. The adjoining abandoned buildings of mikvah and Rabbi's home were torn down in the 1970s. Under state ownership, the structure has been renovated and some architectural elements altered. As of 2019, it still houses the local State Archives bureau.

== See also ==
- Kielce pogrom
