= Hermann tom Ring =

German painter

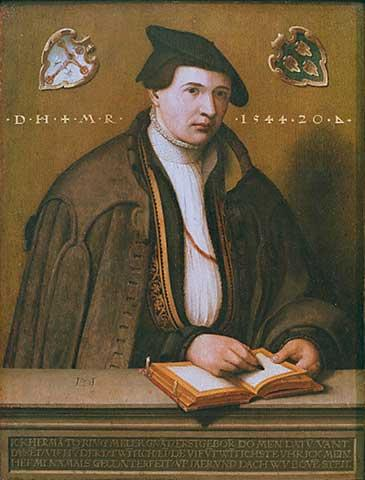
Self-portrait, from 1544 (oil on oak wood)

Hermann tom Ring (German pronunciation: [ˈhɛʁman tɔm ˈʁɪŋ]; 2 January 1521 in Münster – 18 October 1596 in Münster), was a German Renaissance painter.

== Biography ==
He was the pupil of his father, Ludger tom Ring the Elder. His brother, Ludger tom Ring the Younger, was also a painter. He spent his journeyman years in the Netherlands and returned to Münster, around 1544 at the latest, and created his first known work; a self-portrait. All of his subsequent works were done for the local Catholic churches.

From 1556, he was the Second Master of the Painters' Guild and served as Master from 1569 to 1597. In addition to paintings, he designed chimneys, gables and various carvings. He also created the wings of the High Altar and paintings of the Evangelists at the Überwasserkirche.
