= Pfeffer =

Pfeffer is a German surname meaning "pepper" and may refer to:

- Anna Pfeffer (born 1946), Hungarian Olympic medalist sprint canoer
- Anshel Pfeffer (born 1973), British journalist
- Anton Pfeffer (born 1965), Austrian footballer
- Big Jeff Pfeffer (1882–1954), American Major League pitcher (not to be confused with his brother Jeff Pfeffer)
- Camilla Pfeffer (born 1993), German gymnast
- David Pfeffer (born 1982), German singer
- Franz Pfeffer von Salomon (1888–1968), German Nazi first commander of the SA
- Fred Pfeffer (1860–1932), American baseball player
- Fritz Pfeffer (1889–1944), German, Nazi victim in the Holocaust
- Georg Johann Pfeffer (1854–1931), German zoologist
- Georg Pfeffer (1943–2020), German anthropologist
- Jack Pfefer (also commonly spelled as "Pfeffer") (1894–1974), professional wrestling promoter
- Jeff Pfeffer (1888–1972), American pitcher (not to be confused with his brother Big Jeff Pfeffer)
- Jeffrey Pfeffer (born 1946), American professor of organizational behavior
- Karl Pfeffer-Wildenbruch (1888–1971) member of the German Nazi Waffen-SS
- Kévin Pfeffer, French politician
- Kirk Pfeffer (born 1956), American marathon runner
- Lachlan Pfeffer (born 1991), Australian cricketer
- Leo Pfeffer (1910–1993), American legal scholar re: separation of church and state
- Max Pfeffer (1883–1955), general in the Wehrmacht of Nazi Germany
- Nicolai Pfeffer (born 1985), German clarinettist
- Ori Pfeffer (born 1975), Israeli actor
- Pierre Pfeffer (1927–2016), French zoologist and conservationist
- Sascha Pfeffer (born 1986), German footballer
- Susan Beth Pfeffer (1948–2025), American author best known for young adult science fiction
- Thomas Pfeffer (born 1957), German sport shooter
- Washek Pfeffer (1936–2021), Czech/US mathematician
- Wilhelm Pfeffer (1845–1920), German botanist
- Zach Pfeffer (born 1995), American soccer player

== See also ==
- Fefer/Feffer, Feifer/Feiffer, Peifer/Peiffer, Pfeifer/Pfeiffer, Pfefer/Pfeffer, Pfeufer/Pfeuffer, Pheiffer, Phifer
- Paeper, Peper/Pepper, Peperzak, Peeper, Pieper, Piepers, Pijper/Pijpers, Piper
