= James H. Fay =

American lawyer and politician

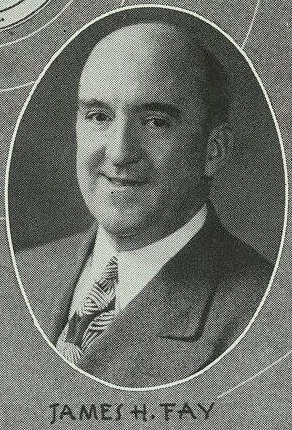
- Fay in 1944

Member of the United States House of Representatives
- In office January 3, 1943 – January 3, 1945
- Preceded by: William T. Pheiffer
- Succeeded by: Ellsworth B. Buck
- Constituency: New York's 16th congressional district
- In office January 3, 1939 – January 3, 1941
- Preceded by: John J. O'Connor
- Succeeded by: William T. Pheiffer
- Constituency: New York's 16th congressional district

Personal details
- Born: James Herbert Fay; April 29, 1899 Manhattan, New York, US
- Died: September 10, 1948 (aged 49) Manhattan, New York, US
- Resting place: Long Island National Cemetery, East Farmingdale, New York, US
- Party: Democratic
- Spouse: Hazel DeWitt Fay (m. 1931)
- Children: 2
- Education: Brooklyn Law School
- Occupation: Government official

Military service
- Allegiance: New York; United States
- Service: New York National Guard; United States Army
- Years of service: 1917–1918 (National Guard); 1918–1919 (US Army)
- Rank: Private First Class
- Unit: 69th Infantry Regiment (National Guard); 165th Infantry Regiment (Army)
- Wars: World War I
- Awards: Purple Heart

James Herbert Fay (April 29, 1899 – September 10, 1948) was an American veteran of World War I, government official, and politician from New York. A Democrat, he served two nonconsecutive terms as a member of the United States House of Representatives from 1939 to 1941 and 1943 to 1945.

== Biography ==
James H. Fay was born in Manhattan, New York on April 29, 1899. He was educated in Manhattan and graduated from De La Salle Institute.

=== World War I ===
In 1917, he enlisted in the New York National Guard's 69th Infantry Regiment. The regiment was federalized for World War I service as the 165th Infantry; Fay served in France and attained the rank of private first class. Fay was wounded during the war and lost his left leg below the knee, and he received the Purple Heart. He was discharged from the military in 1919.

=== Early career ===
In 1923, Fay was appointed secretary to the president of Bellevue and Allied Hospitals. In 1929, he received his LL.B. degree from Brooklyn Law School. His continued his civilian career as a government official; he was New York City's deputy commissioner and acting commissioner of hospitals from 1929 to 1934 and the Internal Revenue Service's chief field deputy for New York's 3rd district from 1935 to 1938.

=== Congress ===
James H. Fay, New York Rep-elect, White House visit, November 18, 1938

In 1938, Fay was the successful Democratic nominee in New York's 16th congressional district. A supporter of Franklin D. Roosevelt and the New Deal, he defeated incumbent and New Deal critic John J. O'Connor in the primary. Fay won the general election, and served one term, 1939 to 1941.

He lost his 1940 reelection bid to Republican nominee William T. Pheiffer.

In 1942, Fay won a rematch against Pheiffer and served one term, 1943 to 1945. Fay did not run again in 1944, and was succeeded by Ellsworth B. Buck. He then returned to Manhattan, where he worked in the field of advertising and public relations.

=== Death and burial ===
Fay died at his home in Gramercy Park, Manhattan on September 10, 1948. He was buried at Pinelawn National Cemetery in East Farmingdale, New York, which is now Long Island National Cemetery.

=== Family ===
In 1931, Fay married Hazel DeWitt Kelly. They were the parents of two children, James Herbert and Hazel.

== Sources ==
U.S. House of Representatives
| Preceded by John J. O'Connor | Member of the U.S. House of Representatives from New York's 16th congressional district 1939–1941 | Succeeded by William T. Pheiffer |
| Preceded by William T. Pheiffer | Member of the U.S. House of Representatives from New York's 16th congressional district 1943–1945 | Succeeded by Ellsworth B. Buck |
