= Ludger tom Ring the Younger =

German painter

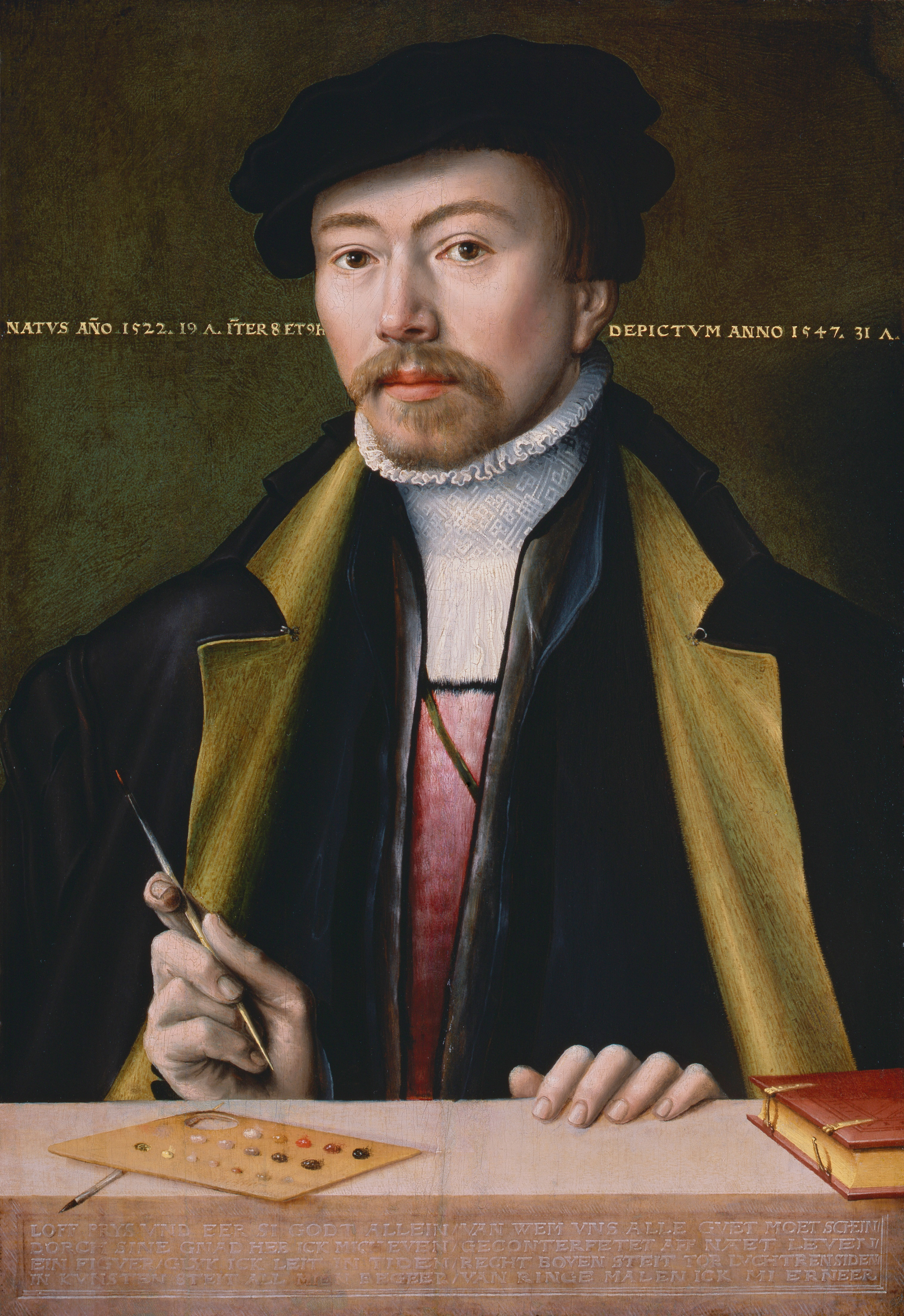
Selfportrait, Herzog Anton Ulrich Museum, 1547

Ludger tom Ring the Younger (19 July or November 1522 – 22 May 1584) was a German painter and draughtsman. His father and brothers were also painters. He primarily painted portraits and still lifes.

== Early life ==
Ludger tom Ring the Younger was born in Münster. He was the second son of Ludger tom Ring the Elder. Until his father's death in 1547, he trained artistically with him, and later worked in his older brother Hermann tom Ring's, studio. He also travelled with him to the Low Countries and England. His first painting, a self-portrait now in Brunswick's Herzog Anton Ulrich Museum, was painted in 1547.

He worked in Antwerp between Antwerpen 1553 and 1568. Here he is believed to have collaborated with the Flemish painter Adriaen Thomasz Key on works such as the Portrait of a 27-year-old woman with a bouquet of flowers in which Ludger tom Ring the Younger painted the flower piece and Key the portrait. He appears to have worked in Hermann's studio again, from 1555 to 1557. He painted mainly portraits, animals and still-lifes. His whereabouts until 1568 are unknown, although it is known that he made the acquaintance of the Flemish cartographer, Abraham Ortelius.

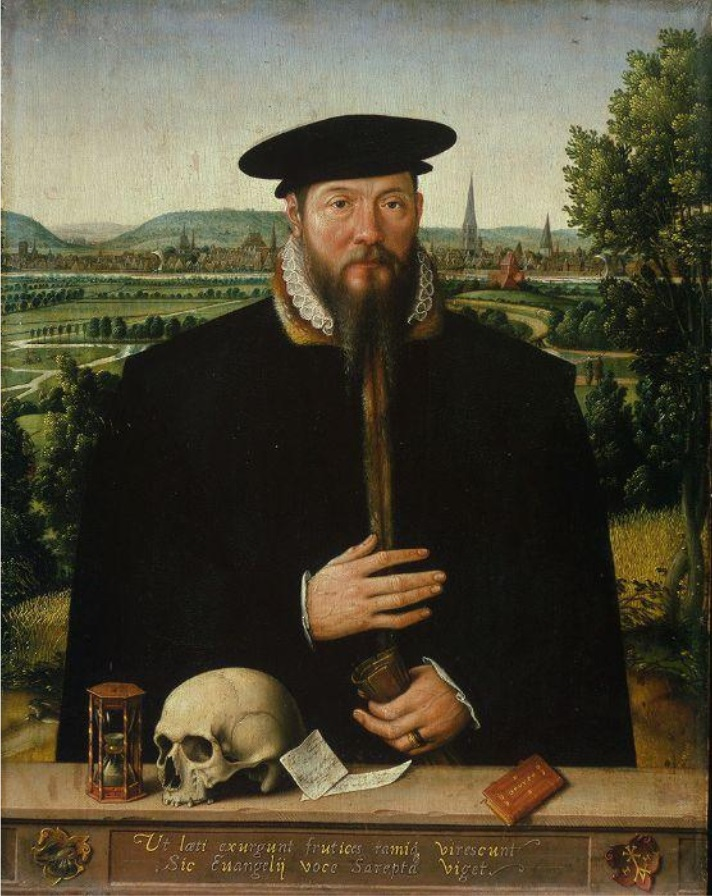
Portrait of the Protestant minister Hermann Huddaeus of Minden, 1568

== In Braunschweig ==
On 27 January 1569 he applied to be a citizen of Braunschweig, receiving citizenship on 27 March 1572. He married the widow Ilse Bardenwerper and they lived in the Altewiek district. He created many portraits of Braunschweiger patricians and clergy, many of them double portraits of married couples, some of which now hang in the Herzog Anton Ulrich Museum, and one in the Metropolitan Museum in New York. In addition to prominent citizens of the city, he also painted the reformer Martin Chemnitz. He died in May 1584.
