= Ferdinand Peper =

Dutch computer scientist

- Born: July 8, 1961 (age 65); Hengelo
- Education: Delft University of Technology
- Known for: Unconventional computing Nanocomputing; Asynchronous systems Cellular automaton Token based logic schemes Reconfigurable hardware Instantaneous Noise-based logic
- Scientific career
- Fields: Computer Science
- Workplaces: Kobe Advanced ICT Research Center, National Institute of Information and Communications Technology, Japan

Ferdinand Peper (born 1961) is a Dutch theoretical computer scientist.

Peper obtained his PhD at the Delft University of Technology in 1989 with the thesis Efficient network topologies for extensible massively parallel computers. He currently is working in a senior research position at Kobe Advanced ICT Research Center, and the National Institute of Information and Communications Technology. He is best known for his research on Nanocomputing, Asynchronous systems, Cellular automaton, Reconfigurable hardware and Instantaneous Noise-based logic. His research goals are to develop next-generation computing and communication architectures and also schemes enhanced by Nanotechnology and Nanoelectronics including single-electron transistors. Particular topics of his research include the reduction of energy requirement, the exploitation of noise and fluctuations for informatics, and the features of molecular self-organization and self-assembly. He was the Chair of the Fourth International Workshop on Natural Computing (2009) and acted as a co-editor of the book Natural Computing (Springer). He is a member of editorial board of the International Journal of Unconventional Computing.

== Most cited papers ==
- Peper F, Lee J, Adachi S, et al., "Laying out circuits on asynchronous cellular arrays: a step towards feasible nanocomputers?", Nanotechnology 14 (2003) 469-485.
- Peper F, Lee J, Abo F, et al., "Fault-tolerance in nanocomputers: A cellular array approach", IEEE Trans. Nanotechnology 3 (2004) 187-201.
- Adachi S, Peper F, Lee J, "Computation by asynchronously updating cellular automata", J. Stat. Phys. 114 (2004) 261-289.
- Peper F, Isokawa T, Kouda N, et al., "Self-timed cellular automata and their computational ability", Future Generation Computer Systems 18 (2002) 893-904.

== See also ==
- Asynchronous circuit
- Natural computing
- Unconventional computing
- Noise-based logic
