= Judge Pepper =

Judge Pepper may refer to:

- Pamela Pepper (born 1964), judge of the United States District Court for the Eastern District of Wisconsin
- W. Allen Pepper Jr. (1941–2012), judge of the United States District Court for the Northern District of Mississippi

== See also ==
- Judge Pepper, a character in Judge Dredd media
