= Kelly Pepper =

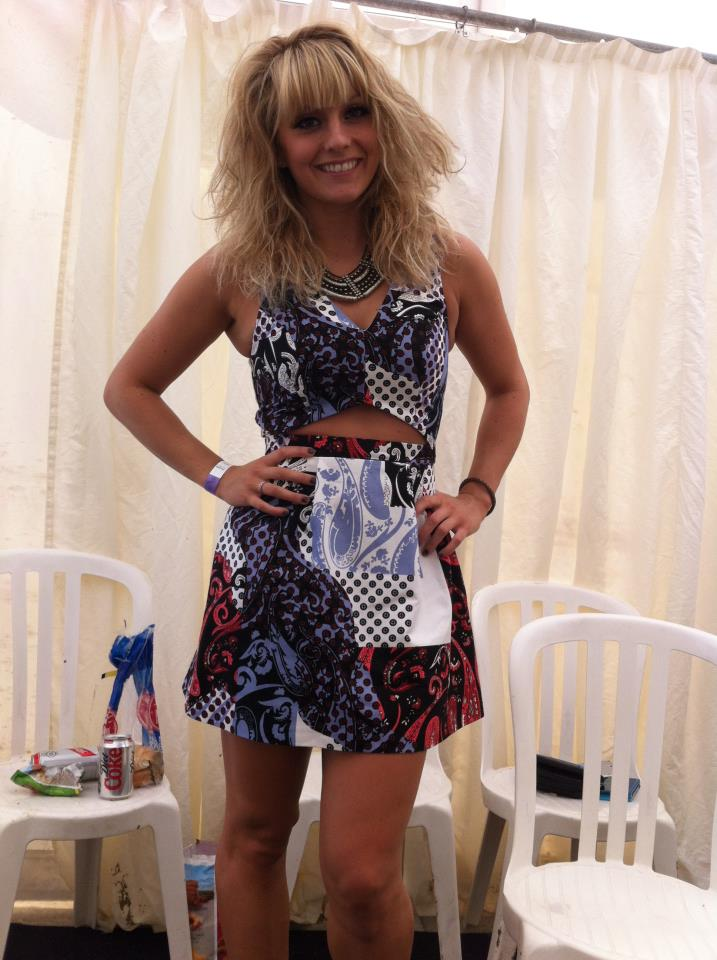
- Kelly Pepper backstage at Penn Festival 2012

Background information
- Born: Kelly Louise Pepper
- Origin: London, England
- Genre: Drum and bass
- Occupations: Singer, songwriter, DJ, model, presenter
- Instruments: Vocals, acoustic guitar
- Years active: 2012–present
- Label: Grinnin' Records (UK) ProBeat (Asia)
- Website: kellypepper.co.uk

Kelly Louise Pepper is an English singer-songwriter and protege of drum and bass DJ and record producer, Ray Keith. She has charted in the top 20 Music Week chart three times with her first three singles "Believe In Me", "Drop The Bomb" and "Koh Samui". The music video for latest single "Koh Samui" premiered on Vevo on 30 September 2014 and signed to ProBeat South Korea in late 2014.

== Early life ==
Pepper is the eldest of four children, raised in Bexleyheath, Kent. She began songwriting at the age of 13, after enrolling on several songwriting and development courses, including PPM (Polo Piatti Management) of which Pixie Lott was also a student.

== Music career ==
In 2013, Pepper released debut single "Believe In Me" which was playlisted on Bang Radio and Reprezent radio stations and supported by DJ EZ on Kiss Radio. Her follow-up single "Drop The Bomb" featured a sample by the Ragga Twins and received similar radio support. Her most recent single "Koh Samui" received support from Ministry Of Sound Clubbers Guide on Capital Xtra and from Mike Delinquent on Kiss FM. Throughout 2014, Pepper has written tracks for Sigma, Matrix & Futurebound and Drumsound & Bassline Smith as well as writing for TV and film. Pepper has previously supported Labrinth and Example at festival appearances over the UK and Europe.

== Musical influences ==
In an interview with Female First, Pepper stated that early 2000s trance music had influenced her music as well as commercial drum and bass such as Chase & Status and Skrillex.

== Discography ==
=== As lead artist ===
| Title | Release date |
|---|---|
| "Believe In Me" | August 2013 |
| "Drop The Bomb" (featuring sample by Ragga Twins) | April 2014 |
| "Koh Samui" | November 2014 |
| "I Don't Need You" feat Rubi Dan | 2015 |

=== As featured artist ===
| Title | Release date |
|---|---|
| "Dreams" (K.I.G featuring Kelly Pepper) | February 2012 |
| "Break These Walls Down" (10 Below featuring Kelly Pepper & Gracious K) | May 2012 |
| "One" (Yohann Mills featuring Kelly Pepper) | 2015 |

== Peppered TV ==
In August 2013 Pepper founded online music show Peppered TV, showcasing new musicians online. The first acts included Jodie Connor, Marvell and Labrinth's sister ShezAr.

== Modelling ==
In May 2014, Pepper was named one of 30 finalists for the Miss Universe Great Britain title which was later won by Grace Levy. In September 2014, Pepper revealed she had been awarded the title Miss Earth Kent for the 2015 Miss Earth beauty pageant.
