= Pepper Wilson =

American public relations executive (1921–1988)

George F. "Pepper" Wilson (c. 1921 – September 29, 1988) was an American public relations executive who served as general manager of the Cincinnati Royals from 1958 to 1969.

== Early life ==
Wilson was born in Birmingham, Alabama and moved to Cincinnati during his youth. He graduated from Withrow High School in 1939. He played for the Withrow High baseball team and received the nickname Pepper because his style of play was seen as similar to Pepper Martin's. He attended the University of Cincinnati and spent a year with the Cincinnati Post before joining the United States Army Air Corps. He was the Oahu correspondent for Stars and Stripes. When World War II ended, Wilson returned to the Post, where he remained until 1949. He then spent eight years as the sports information director at the University of Dayton.

== Cincinnati Royals ==
When the Rochester Royals moved to Cincinnati in 1957, Wilson joined the team as publicity director. He served as the club's de facto general manager after Les Harrison sold the team and was official given the title in October 1958. In 1969 the team hired Joe Axelson as the team's new general manager while Wilson, who was promoted to vice president, would handle player development, contracts, player transactions, and scouting. However, Wilson soon left the team to become the public relations director for the Cincinnati Zoo.

== Later life ==
Wilson worked for the Zoo for nine years. In 1979 he joined The Cincinnati Enquirer as a copy editor, but was forced to leave after a week due to a stroke. He then served as an account supervisor at Kemble Communications until 1980, when a heart attack forced his retirement. Wilson died on September 29, 1988, following another heart attack. He was buried in Spring Grove Cemetery.
