= Carl Ferdinand Pfeifer =

- Born: December 18, 1915
- Died: May 12, 2001 (aged 85)
- Burial place: Arlington National Cemetery
- Spouses: Dorothy Dowling (divorced): Mary Louis Whitmore
- Military career
- Allegiance: United States
- Branch: Navy
- Rank: Captain
- Commands: USS Cassin Young (DD-793) (1945–1946)
- Conflicts: World War II; Pearl Harbor; Korean War; Vietnam War; Operation Oregon
- Awards: Silver Star; Legion of Merit with "V" device; Legion of Merit
- Other work: naval aide in the Truman and Eisenhower administrations, Inspector General of the Military Sea Transportation Service

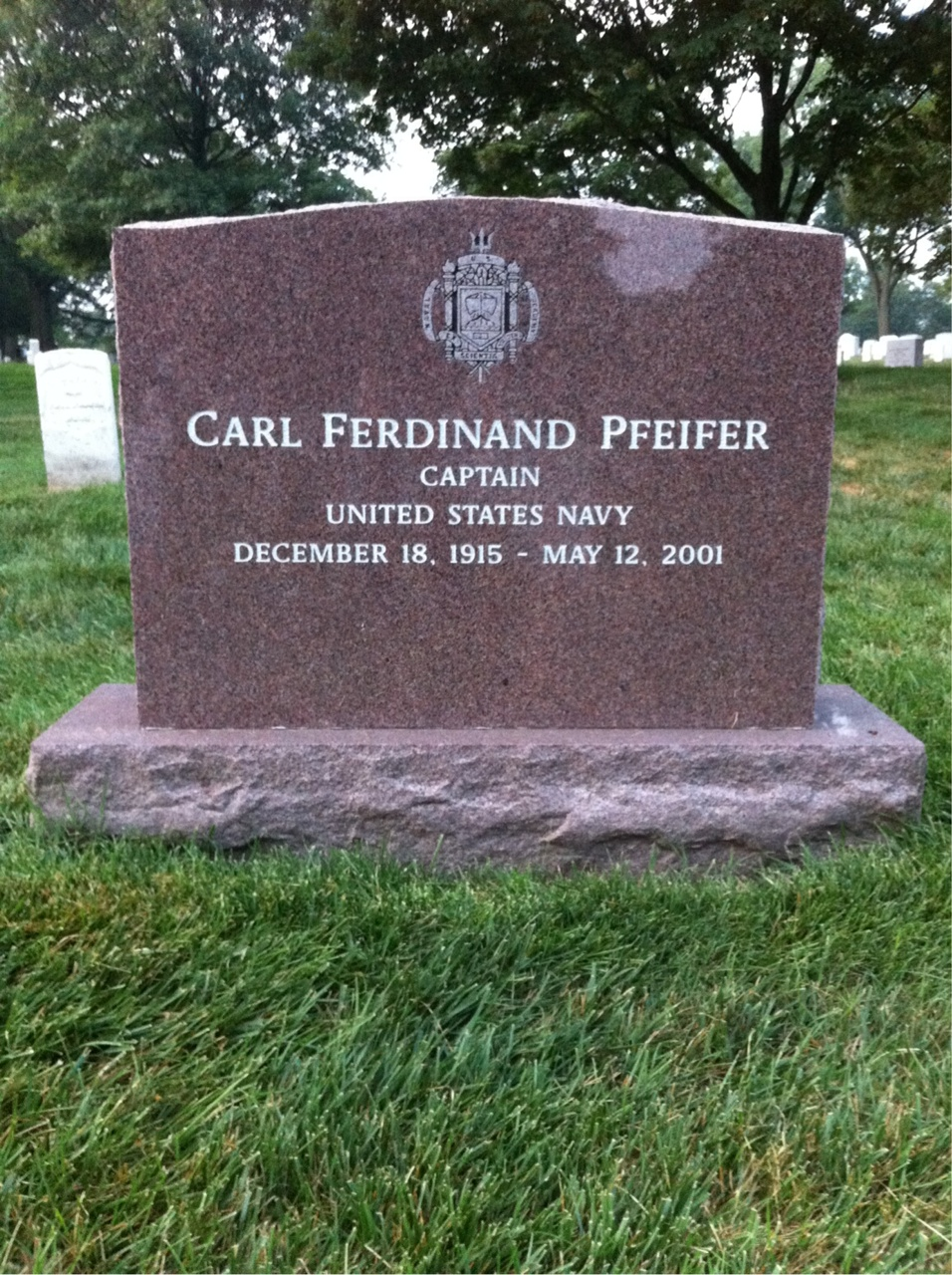
Grave at Arlington National Cemetery

Carl Ferdinand Pfeifer (December 18, 1915 – May 12, 2001) was an officer in the United States Navy and naval aide to Presidents Harry S. Truman and Dwight D. Eisenhower. A native of Springfield, Ohio, he would marry twice. His first marriage to Dorothy Shreve Dowling on November 2, 1957 ended in divorce in 1960. He then married Mary Louise Whitmire on October 4, 1986 to whom he remained married for the rest of his life. He is buried at Arlington National Cemetery.

== Career ==
Pfeifer graduated from the United States Naval Academy in 1939. He would serve aboard the USS Cummings (DD-365) in Pearl Harbor, where he survived the sneak attack by the Japanese. Later during World War II, he commanded the USS Cassin Young (DD-793). Following the war, he served as a naval aide in the Truman and Eisenhower administrations. Later he served in the Korean War and Vietnam War and as Inspector General of the Military Sea Transportation Service.

During his career, he was awarded the Silver Star and twice awarded the Legion of Merit, one of the Legions of Merit coming with a valor device.

His award citation for the Silver Star reads:

The President of the United States of America takes pleasure in presenting the Silver Star to Lieutenant Carl Ferdinand Pfeifer (NSN: 0-82626), United States Navy, for conspicuous gallantry and intrepidity as Engineer Officer of the U.S.S. O'BANNON (DD-450), during engagements with the enemy in the Guadalcanal-Tulagi Area on 12 & 13 November 1942. During this period the ship was subjected to a heavy enemy torpedo plane attack and engaged at close quarters by a superior enemy force of surface ships. By his ability and fearless leadership he maintained control of the engineering plant at all times under conditions of extreme operations and moments of stress. By clear, quick action and calmness when his ship experienced a heavy underwater shock resulting in loss of light and power and much confusion breakage and damage he was instrumental in quickly regaining control of his plant allowing the ship to continue its mission with no decrease of effectiveness. By his actions and attitude he was an inspiration to all on board. His conduct throughout was in keeping with the highest traditions of the United States Naval Service.

His award citation for his first Legion of Merit reads:

The President of the United States of America takes pleasure in presenting the Legion of Merit with Combat "V" to Commander Carl Ferdinand Pfeifer (NSN: 0-82626), United States Navy, for exceptionally meritorious conduct in the performance of outstanding services to the Government of the United States as Engineering Officer of the U.S.S. VALLEY FORGE during operations against enemy aggressor forces in Korea from 25 June 1950 to 22 March 1951. An officer of outstanding skill and ingenuity, Commander Pfeifer maintained the machinery of his ship in a high state of material readiness, thereby contributing materially to the successful accomplishment of all assigned missions. Undaunted by the lack of time available for preventive maintenance and the lack of sufficient material and parts, he was responsible for the efficient functioning of the VALLEY FORGE throughout its operations in support of our ground forces in Korea. His professional ability, resourcefulness and staunch devotion to duty were in keeping with the highest traditions of the United States Naval Service. (Commander Pfeifer is authorized to wear the Combat "V".)

His award citation for his second Legion of Merit reads:

The President of the United States of America takes pleasure in presenting a Gold Star in lieu of a Second Award of the Legion of Merit to Captain Carl Ferdinand Pfeifer (NSN: 0-82626), United States Navy, for exceptionally meritorious conduct in the performance of outstanding services to the Government of the United States from 20 July 1966 to 3 June 1967, as Commanding Officer, Military Sea Transpiration Service Office, Vietnam. Assuming his duties at a critical time during the U.S. military buildup in Vietnam and during the organization and expansion of his office, Captain Pfeifer displayed outstanding executive ability in organizing and expanding the services in support of U.S. forces in Vietnam. In addition to contributing greatly to the successful introduction of containership service to Vietnam, he exercised remarkable tact and diplomacy in coordinating sealift services with Vietnamese officials, American Embassy personnel, and other service commands, and civilian shipping agents. During Operation OREGON when Military Sea Transportation Service Office, Vietnam, was required to provide the transportation for an Army Brigade moving into I Corps on short notice, Captain Pfeifer reacted effectively and efficiently to provide the necessary shipping for a most successful operation. When the 4th Transportation Command was tasked by the Secretary of Defense to eliminate the port congestion in Saigon, Captain Pfeifer cooperated to the fullest with the Army, thereby making it possible for the various commands responsible to clear the congestion in Saigon; to provide the necessary berths; to offload the many loaded barges; and to take positive action to rearrange military shipping to expedite offloading of commercial cargo, thus permitting the clearing of the port in a period of about four months. By his outstanding leadership, sound judgment, and devotion to duty, Captain Pfeifer upheld the highest traditions of the United States Naval Service.
