= James Reese Phifer =

American businessman and philanthropist

- Born: February 19, 1916; Tuscaloosa, Alabama, USA
- Died: 1998 (aged 81–82); Tuscaloosa, Alabama, USA
- Education: University of Alabama
- Occupation: Businessman
- Spouse: Sue Clarkson
- Children: 1 son, 3 daughters
- Parent(s): William Phifer (father); Olga Gough (mother)

James Reese Phifer (1916–1998) was an American businessman and philanthropist from Alabama.

== Early life ==
James Reese Phifer was born on February 19, 1916, in Tuscaloosa, Alabama. His father was William Phifer and his mother, Olga Gough.

He graduated from the University of Alabama, where he received a bachelor's degree, followed by a law degree. He also learned how to fly airplanes.

== Career ==
Phifer started his career as a lawyer. During World War II, he helped train British and French pilots.

In 1952, Phifer founded the Phifer Aluminum Screen Company, a manufacturing company. The firm made Phifer, an insect screening made of fiberglass. It also produced Sunscreen, a sunray- and heat-resistant sunscreen, and Phifertex, a coating made of vinyl which protects furniture from the sun. By 1956, he renamed the company Phifer Wire Products. It is now known as Phifer, Inc. By 1998, according to The New York Times, it produced "more than half the world's aluminum insect screening and more than 60 percent of the world's fiberglass insect screening."

== Philanthropy ==
Phifer founded the Reese Phifer Jr. Memorial Trust, a philanthropic non-profit organization, in 1964. Additionally, he made charitable contributions to his alma mater, the University of Alabama. He received the Tutwiler Award in 1981 and an honorary doctorate in 1984. By 1991, the Reese Phifer Hall was renamed in his honor.

He was inducted into the Alabama Business Hall of Fame in 1991. Ten years later, in 2001, he was inducted into the Tuscaloosa County Civic Hall of Fame.

== Personal life ==
He married Sue Clarkson. They had a son, who predeceased him, and three daughters.

== Death ==
He died in 1998 in Tuscaloosa, Alabama.
