= Pepper Winters =

American novelist

- Born: Hong Kong
- Occupation: Novelist
- Website: http://pepperwinters.com/

Pepper Winters is a novelist best known for dark romance, contemporary, romantic suspense, and erotica thrillers. Her romantic novels have reached The New York Times, The Wall Street Journal, and USA Today best sellers. She received the IndieReader Badge for a Top 10 Indie Bestseller in the romantic novels category. She currently has 30 books released in nine languages.

== Background ==
Born and raised in Hong Kong, Winters draw on her English roots to pen complex characters who live all around the world. Married, she has a house rabbit that keeps her company while writing. She has built her career upon eroticism and romanticism. As an author, she is drawn to stories that clasp audience's desire. Winters saw success with the launch of her first book Tears of Tess in 2013. The book was listed on Top 20 Amazon Bestseller list while many others, including Ruin & Rule, Destroyed, and Indebted Series have been landed on the USA Today's Best-Selling Books list and The New York Times Best Seller list. Winters has twelve publications, including her recent release Unseen Messages which focuses on a survival contemporary novel. Many of her books have been translated into foreign languages. Her books enjoy global accolades and currently being adapted into an audio. She is considered a hybrid author, having successfully self-published while maintaining active contracts with Grand Central, Hachette.

== Bibliography ==
=== Dark Romance Books ===
- Pepper Winters (2013). Tears of Tess (Monsters in the Dark #1). ISBN 978-1492103745.
- Pepper Winters (2013). Quintessentially Q (Monsters in the Dark #2). CreateSpace Independent Publishing Platform. ISBN 978-1492305415.
- Pepper Winters (2014). Twisted Together (Monsters in the Dark #3). CreateSpace Independent Publishing Platform. ISBN 9781499752823.
- Pepper Winters (2016). Je Suis à Toi (Monsters in the Dark #3.5). ISBN 1533331839
- Pepper Winters (2014). Debt Inheritance (Indebted #1). CreateSpace Independent Publishing Platform. ISBN 978-1500607531.
- Pepper Winters (2014). First Debt (Indebted Series #2). CreateSpace. ISBN 978-1503149304.
- Pepper Winters (2015). Second Debt (Indebted Series #3). CreateSpace Independent Publishing Platform. ISBN 978-1507628553.
- Pepper Winters (2015). Third Debt (Indebted #4). CreateSpace Independent Publishing Platform. ISBN 978-1511647397.
- Pepper Winters (2015). Fourth Debt (Indebted Series #5). CreateSpace Independent Publishing Platform. ISBN 978-1512203660.
- Pepper Winters (2015). Final Debt (Indebted Series #6). CreateSpace Independent Publishing Platform. ISBN 978-1519380609.
- Pepper Winters (2015). Indebted Epilogue (Indebted Series #7). CreateSpace Independent Publishing Platform. ISBN 978-1519380418.
- Pepper Winters (2016). Pennies (Dollar #1). ISBN 1535055227
- Pepper Winters (2016). Dollars (Dollar #2). ISBN 1540379426
- Pepper Winters (2017). Hundreds (Dollar #3). ISBN 1981498443
- Pepper Winters (2017). Thousands (Dollar #4). ISBN 1540448088
- Pepper Winters (2017). Millions (Dollar #5). ISBN 1981498702
- Pepper Winter (2020). Once A Myth (Goddess Isles #1). ISBN 1653889861
- Pepper Winter (2020). Twice A Wish (Goddess Isles #2). ISBN 1653891785
- Third A Kiss (Goddess Isles #3) coming April 2020.
- Fourth A Lie (Goddess Isles #4) coming May 2020.
- Fifth A Fury (Goddess Isles #5) coming June 2020.

=== Grey Romance Books ===
- Pepper Winters (2014). Destroyed. CreateSpace Independent Publishing Platform. ISBN 9781496146236.
- Pepper Winters (2015). Ruin & Rule (Pure Corruption MC #1). ISBN 1455589330
- Pepper Winters (2016). Sin & Suffer (Pure Corruption MC #2). ISBN 1455589365
- Pepper Winters (2017). Crown of Lies (Truth & Lies Duet #1). ISBN 1635760933
- Pepper Winters (2017). Throne of Truth (Truth & Lies Duet #2). ISBN 3736306997
- Pepper Winters (2019). The Body Painter (Master of Trickery Duet #1). ISBN 1092771662
- Pepper Winters (2019). The Living Canvas (Master of Trickery Duet #2). ISBN 1699283028

=== Contemporary Romance Books ===
- Winters, Pepper (2016). Unseen Messages (Survival Romance). CreateSpace Independent Publishing Platform. p. 714. ISBN 978-1530647545.
- Pepper Winters (2018). The Boy & His Ribbon (The Ribbon Duet #1). ISBN 1386602868
- Pepper Winters (2018). The Girl & Her Ren (The Ribbon Duet #2). ISBN 198645553X
- Pepper Winter (2019). The Son & His Hope. ISBN 1796532207
