= Emil Pfeiffer =

German physician and pediatrician

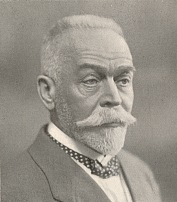
- Born: 1 March 1846; Wiesbaden, Nassau
- Died: 13 July 1921 (aged 75); Wiesbaden, Hesse-Nassau
- Education: Humboldt University of Berlin
- Known for: Describing infectious mononucleosis
- Scientific career
- Fields: Medicine

Emil Pfeiffer (1 March 1846 – 13 July 1921) was a German physician and pediatrician.

He studied medicine at the universities of Bonn, Würzburg, and Berlin. It was at Berlin where he received his doctorate in 1869.

As a pediatrician he dealt with issues of infant nutrition, campaigned for the establishment of children's homes and crèches. He is known for describing infectious mononucleosis (also known as "mono," "glandular fever," and "kissing disease"), an Epstein–Barr virus-induced infectious disease of the lymphatic tissue that also bears his name—Pfeiffer's disease.
