= Sgt. Pepper's Lonely Hearts Club Band (disambiguation) =

Sgt. Pepper's Lonely Hearts Club Band is a 1967 album by the Beatles.

It may also refer to:

- "Sgt. Pepper's Lonely Hearts Club Band" (song), the first and twelfth song on the Beatles album
- Sgt. Pepper's Lonely Hearts Club Band (film), a 1978 musical film based on the album
  - Sgt. Pepper's Lonely Hearts Club Band (soundtrack), the soundtrack to the film
- Sgt. Pepper's Lonely Hearts Club Band: 50th Anniversary Edition, an expanded edition of the album
- Sgt. Pepper Live, a 2009 live album and DVD by American rock band Cheap Trick
- Sgt. Pepper's (Big Daddy album)

== See also ==
- List of images on the cover of Sgt. Pepper's Lonely Hearts Club Band
- Sergeant "Pepper" Anderson, the fictional character from the Police Woman television series
