= Mojżesz Pfefer =

Polish industrialist and activist

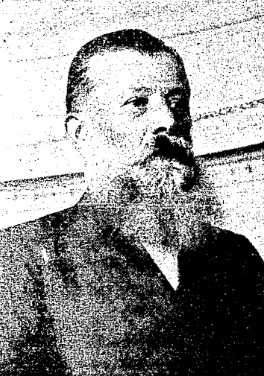

Mojżesz Pfefer (also Pfeffer, Hebrew: משה מנחם מנלי פפעפער; 1856-1919) was a Polish-Jewish industrialist and landowner, as well as philanthropist and social activist. Born to a family of Orthodox Jews, Pfefer headed a number of progressive Jewish societies in Congress Poland, notably Ezra and Achi-Ezer. A long time councilman of the Kielce Governorate, he was the principal founder of the Kielce Jewish Hospital and the Kielce Synagogue. He died 1 April 1919 and is buried at the Okopowa Street Jewish Cemetery in Warsaw.
