= David Tidboald =

British-born South African conductor

David Tidboald (30 September 1926, Plymouth - 2 July 2018, Cape Town) was a British-born South African conductor.

== Career ==
Born in Plymouth, Tidboald was conscripted at the age of 18 but saw no action. He was sent to Berlin at the end of the Second World War on his request where he was mentored by Leopold Ludwig and Wilhelm Furtwängler. He first visited South Africa to accompany British ballerina Beryl Grey before later settling in Cape Town. He first conducted the Cape Town Municipal Orchestra (later Cape Town Symphony Orchestra) in November 1957, becoming its orchestral director from 1960 until 1965.

On the formation of the Cape Performing Arts Board in 1970, Tidboald founded the orchestra for both ballet and opera performances. In 1983 he was asked to establish the Natal Philharmonic Orchestra. His legacy includes Cape Town's annual youth music festival, founded in 1975, and Durban's Youth Concerto Festival Concert, founded in 1985.
