= Mark Peifer =

Mark Peifer is an American biologist specializing in cell adhesion, cytoskeletal regulation, and Wnt signaling in development and cancer. He is currently the Michael Hooker Distinguished Professor at the University of North Carolina, and an Elected Fellow of the American Association for the Advancement of Science.
