= August Pieper (theologian) =

August Pieper (14 March 1866 – 25 September 1942) was a German theologian and chairman of the People's Association for Catholic Germany. He is the author of several publications concerning theological, social and political issues. Pieper was born in Eversberg (now a district of Meschede), and died in Paderborn.
