= Paul Pepper =

American television host

Paul Pepper (real name: Paul Urzi) is a TV host, and used to host a local-focused interview radio show, titled "Radio Friends with Paul Pepper" on KBIA 91.3, mid-Missouri's public radio station. Paul Pepper is a former weatherman for KOMU-TV which serves the central Missouri area (based just south of Columbia, Missouri).

On Friday, September 18, 2009 the TV show Pepper and Friends went off-air after 6343 shows. Paul Pepper used to host a radio program titled "Radio Friends with Paul Pepper" on KBIA 91.3 it ended on November 3, 2023
