= Nanocomputer =

Computer smaller than the microcomputer

Nanocomputer refers to a computer smaller than the microcomputer, which is smaller than the minicomputer.

Microelectronic components that are at the core of all modern electronic devices employ semiconductor transistors. The term nanocomputer is increasingly used to refer to general computing devices of size comparable to a credit card. Modern single-board computer such as the Raspberry Pi and Gumstix would fall under this classification. Arguably, smartphones and tablets would also be classified as nanocomputers.

== Future computers with features smaller than 10 nanometers ==
Die shrink has been more or less continuous since around 1970. A few years later, the 6 μm process allowed the making of desktop computers, known as microcomputers. Moore's Law in the next 40 years brought features 1/100 the size, or ten thousand times as many transistors per square millimeter, putting smartphones in every pocket. Eventually computers will be developed with fundamental parts that are no bigger than a few nanometers.

Nanocomputers might be built in several ways, using mechanical, electronic, biochemical, or quantum nanotechnology. There used to be consensus among hardware developers that it is unlikely that nanocomputers will be made of semiconductor transistors, as they seem to perform significantly less well when shrunk to sizes under 100 nanometers. Nevertheless developers reduced microprocessor features to 22 nm in April 2012. Moreover, Intel's 5 nanometer technology outlook predicts 5 nm feature size by 2022. The International Technology Roadmap for Semiconductors in the 2010s gave an industrial consensus on feature scaling following Moore's Law. A silicon-silicon bond length is 235.2 pm, which means that a 5 nm-width transistor would be 21 silicon atoms wide.

== See also ==
- Nanotechnology
- Quantum computer
- Starseed launcher – interstellar nanoprobes proposal
