= Leonid Raikhman =

Soviet security officer (1908–1990)

Leonid Fedorovitch Raikhman (27 December 1908 – 14 March 1990; also spelled Reichman; Russian: Леонид Фёдорович Райхман; known by his alias Zaitsev), was a Soviet security officer, who rose to be a Lieutenant General in the NKVD, NKGB and MGB. He prepared evidence related to the Katyn massacre for the Burdenko Commission in 1943, and later, for the International Military Tribunal in the Nuremberg in 1946.
