= Senator Pepper =

Senator Pepper may refer to:

- Claude Pepper (1900–1989), U.S. Senator from Florida from 1936 to 1951
- George W. Pepper (1867–1961), U.S. Senator from Pennsylvania from 1922 to 1927
