= Charles Pepper (cricketer) =

English cricketer (1875–1917)

Charles Pepper (6 June 1875 – 13 September 1917) was an English first-class cricketer active 1900–01 who played for Nottinghamshire. He was born in Youghal, County Cork; died in La Clytte, Belgium when serving in World War I.
