= John Pepper (cricketer) =

English cricketer

Personal information
- Born: 21 October 1922; Wimbledon Park, London, England
- Died: 30 March 2007 (aged 84); Colwyn Bay, Denbighshire, Wales
- Batting: Right-handed

Domestic team information
- Years: Team
- 1946–1948: Cambridge University

Career statistics
Competition	First-class
Matches	29
Runs scored	1,108
Batting average	23.08
100s/50s	1/4
Top score	185
Catches/stumpings	5/–
- Source: Cricinfo, 13 December 2018

John Pepper (21 October 1922 – 30 March 2007) was an English cricketer who played first-class cricket for Cambridge University from 1946 to 1948.

Pepper attended The Leys School before going up to Emmanuel College, Cambridge. The best of his three seasons for the university cricket team was 1947, when he was the team's second-highest scorer with 673 runs at an average of 32.04. He also hit his only century during the 1947 season, 185 in five and a half hours, when he opened the innings against Hampshire.

He died in Colwyn Bay, Denbighshire in March 2007 at the age of 84.
