= Paul C. Pieper =

Paul Pieper
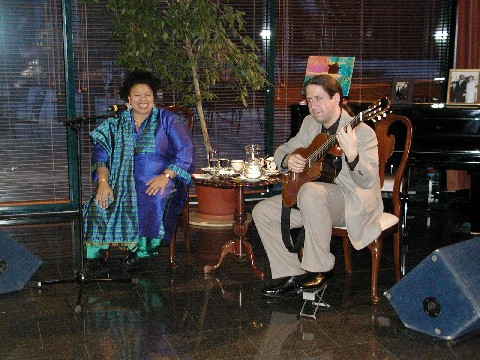
- Paul C. Pieper (right) performing with Ericka Ovette at a 2004 concert in Estonia.

Background information
- Born: Paul C. Pieper; October 20, 1972 (age 53); Washington, D.C., US
- Occupations: Musician, composer
- Instruments: Guitar, bass
- Years active: 1992–present
- Website: www.paulpieper.com

Paul C. Pieper (born October 20, 1972) is an American guitarist and composer, known primarily for his work as a jazz musician.

== Biography ==
Pieper won second place from over 200 competitors at the 1995 Thelonious Monk International Jazz Guitar Competition, a global event whose judges included Jim Hall, Pat Metheny, John Scofield, and Pat Martino. As a jazz musician in the Washington D.C. area, Pieper has numerous appearances at D.C.'s Blues Alley and a 2000 stint with the Smithsonian Jazz Masterworks Orchestra to his name. Pieper has performed as a touring musician in numerous countries, including Bangladesh, Ecuador, Iceland, Japan, Korea, Russia, and Turkey. A composer and arranger, Pieper's compositions "Spider Monkey," "Pensées," "Kineticism," and "The Red and the Black" have all been included on recordings led by other musicians. As a session player, Pieper has appeared on upwards of twenty CD's, such as Buck Hill's 2005 release, Relax. Best known for his work as a jazz player, Pieper's versatility is evidenced by his recent work as band leader and electric bassist for Five Finger Discount, a band performing classic funk songs; he is also a founding member of Washington D.C. area indie rock band Glass and Apples.

== Discography ==
=== As leader ===
- Stories of Before (Bright Orange, 2005)
- Standards (Bright Orange, 2018)
- Making Time (Bright Orange, 2018)

=== As sideman ===
- Buck Hill, Relax (Severn, 2005)
