= Jim Piper (footballer) =

Australian rules footballer

Personal information
- Full name: James Ernest Piper
- Born: 30 April 1884; Geelong West, Victoria
- Died: 25 May 1949 (aged 65); Geelong West, Victoria
- Original team: Geelong College

Playing career^{1}
Years	Club	Games (Goals)
1905	Geelong	1 (0)
1908–09	University	2 (0)
Total		3 (0)
- ^{1} Playing statistics correct to the end of 1909.

James Ernest Piper (30 April 1884 – 25 May 1949) was an Australian rules footballer who played with Geelong and University in the Victorian Football League (VFL). He later served as President of Geelong Football Club from 1923 to 1926.
