= Pijper =

Pijper is a Dutch surname. Notable people with the surname include:

- Theo Pijper (born 1980), Dutch motorcycle speedway rider
- Willem Pijper (1894–1947), Dutch composer, music critic and teacher

== See also ==
- Fefer, Feffer/Fefer, Feifer, Feiffer, Peifer, Pheiffer, Pfeifer, Pfeiffer, Pfefer, Pfeffer, Pfeuffer, Pfeufer, Phifer, Pijper, Piper
