= Pfeufer =

Pfeufer is a German surname. Notable people with the surname include:

- Carl Pfeufer, American sculptor
- Karl von Pfeufer (1806–1869), German physician
- Reed Pfeufer, married name of Reed Champion, American artist and illustrator

== See also ==
- Fefer, Feffer/Fefer, Feifer, Feiffer, Peifer, Pheiffer, Pfeifer, Pfeiffer, Pfefer, Pfeffer, Pfeuffer, Pfeufer, Phifer, Pijper, Piper
