= Pfeiffer (surname) =

Pfeiffer (/ˈfaɪfər/ FY-fər, German: [ˈpfaɪfɐ]) is a German-language occupational surname meaning "whistler" or "pipe-" or "fife-player" and etymologically akin to English Piper and Fifer; other spellings include Pfeifer. Notable people with the name include:

== Arts ==
- Alberta Pfeiffer (1899–1994), Illinois architect
- Carl Pfeiffer (architect) (1834–1888), German-born NYC architect
- Darrin Pfeiffer (born 1969), American musician
- Dedee Pfeiffer (born 1964), American actress
- Emil Pfeiffer (1846–1921), German physician
- Emily Jane Pfeiffer (1827–1890), Welsh poet, philanthropist
- Franz Pfeiffer (literary scholar) (1815–1868), German literary scholar
- Georges Pfeiffer (1835–1908), French composer
- Ida Laura Pfeiffer (1797–1858), Austrian traveller and travel book author
- Johann Pfeiffer (1697–1791), German violinist and composer
- Kyle Pfeiffer (born 1990), American musician
- Michael Traugott Pfeiffer (1771–1849), Swiss music pedagogue
- Michelle Pfeiffer (born 1958), American actress
- Paul Pfeiffer (artist) (born 1966), American video artist
- Pauline Pfeiffer (1895–1951), American journalist and second wife of Ernest Hemingway

== Military ==
- Hermann Pfeiffer, German aviator and flying ace

== Politics and government ==
- Alois Pfeiffer (1924–1987), German trade unionist who served as a European Commissioner in the 1980s
- Burkhard Wilhelm Pfeiffer (1777–1852), German jurist, magistrate, and liberal politician
- Franz Georg Pfeiffer (1784–1856), German civil servant and legal scholar
- Harry H. Pfeiffer (died 1970), American politician
- Joachim Pfeiffer (born 1967), German politician (CDU)
- Sibylle Pfeiffer (born 1951), German politician (CDU)

== Sciences ==
- Carl Pfeiffer (pharmacologist) (1908–88), one of the founders of orthomolecular psychiatry
- Carl Jonas Pfeiffer (1779–1836), German conchologist and banker
- Ehrenfried Pfeiffer (1891–1961), biochemist active in the development of biodynamic agriculture
- Emil Pfeiffer (1846–1921), German physician and pediatrician
- George Adam Pfeiffer (1889–1943), American mathematician
- Georgii Yurii Pfeiffer (1872–1946), Ukrainian mathematician
- Hans Pfeiffer (1937–2022), German physicist
- Louis Pfeiffer (1805–77), German physician, botanist and conchologist
- Paul Pfeiffer (chemist) (1875–1951), German chemist
- Richard Friedrich Johannes Pfeiffer, (1858–1945), German physician and bacteriologist
- Rudolf Arthur Pfeiffer, German geneticist

== Sports ==
- Darren Pfeiffer (born 1987), Australian football player

== Fictional characters ==
- Hans Pfeiffer, a character from the novel Die Feuerzangenbowle

== See also ==
- Fefer, Feffer/Fefer, Feifer, Feiffer, Peifer, Pheiffer, Pfeifer, Pfeiffer, Pfefer, Pfeffer, Pfeuffer, Pfeufer, Phifer, Pijper, Piper
- Pfeiffer House (disambiguation)
- Pfeiffer Georgi, English race cyclist
