= Feffer =

Feffer or Fefer is a surname. Notable people with the surname include:

- Avram Fefer, American jazz saxophonist, composer, and bandleader
- David Feffer (born 1956), Brazilian businessman
- Henry Feffer (1918–2011), American neurosurgeon
- Itzik Feffer or Fefer (1900–1952), Soviet Yiddish poet
- John Feffer, American author and political analyst
- Leon Feffer (1902–1999), Brazilian businessman

== See also ==
- Fefer, Feffer/Fefer, Feifer, Feiffer, Peifer, Pheiffer, Pfeifer, Pfeiffer, Pfefer, Pfeffer, Pfeuffer, Pfeufer, Phifer, Pijper, Piper
