= Veronica Paeper =

South African choreographer and dancer (born 1944)

Veronica Paeper (born 9 April 1944) is a South African choreographer and dancer.

== Career ==
Paeper was born on 9 April 1944 in Port Shepstone but trained with Dulcie Howes at the University of Cape Town Ballet School after her family moved to Cape Town. Although noted as South Africa's most prolific choreographer, Paeper was also a principal dancer with CAPAB, the PACT Ballet and the Orange Free State Ballet.

Paeper choreographed her first ballet, John the Baptist to music by Ernest Bloch for CAPAB in 1972, leading to her appointment as the company's resident choreographer. In 1991, she became the company director of CAPAB and led the company on the first international tour of a South African ballet company, in 1994. She choreographed over 40 works for the company, including a number of full-length works such as Orpheus in the Underwold, A Christmas Carol, Hamlet and Sylvia in Hollywood. She retired from CAPAB (now Cape Town City Ballet) in 2005. She was awarded a Molteno Gold Medal in 2005 'in recognition of her lifetime achievements in the performing arts' by The Cape Tercentenary Foundation. In 2009 she founded the South African National Dance Trust with Robyn Taylor and Mike Bosazzo, a nonprofit organisation to promote dance through performance, education and job opportunities.

== Personal life ==
Paeper married fellow dancer and choreographer Frank Staff in 1966. She and Staff had a son together before his death in 1971. She is now married to Ken Kearns.

== Choreographed works ==
=== 1970s ===
- John the Baptist (music by Ernest Bloch) (1972)
- Herrie-Hulle (music by Prokofiev) (1973)
- Romeo and Juliet (music by Prokofiev) (1974)
- Cinderella (music by Prokofiev) (1975)
- Funtastique (music by Shostakovich) (1975)
- Woman of Autumn (music by Saint Saëns) (1978)
- Whodunnit? (music by Dohnanyi) (1978)
- Concerto for Charlie (music by Shostakovich) (1979)
- Don Quixote (music by Ludwig Minkus) (1979)

=== 1980s ===
- Drie Diere (Three Beasts) (music by Peter Klatzow) (1980)
- Still-Life with Moonbeams (music by Peter Klatzow) (1981)
- A Christmas Carol (various, arranged by David Tidboald) (1982)
- Orpheus in the Underwold (music by Jacques Offenbach, arranged by Michael Tuffin) (1982)
- The Return of the Soldier (music by David Earl) (1982)
- Mix 'n Match (music by Tchaikovsky) (1983)
- Undine (music by Debussy) (1983)
- Spartacus (music by Aram Khachaturian) (1984)
- Nell Gwynne (music by Rossini, arranged by Michael Tuffin) (1984)
- Abelard and Heloise (music by David Earl) (1985)
- The Tales of Hoffmann (music by Jacques Offenbach, arranged by Allan Stephenson) (1985)
- Vespers (music by Peter Klatzow) (1985)
- Sparante (music by Haydn (1986)
- Carmen (music by Bizet, arranged by Michael Tuffin) (1987)
- The Entertainer (music by Scott Joplin) (1987)
- The Merry Widow (music by Lehar, arranged by John Lanchbery) (1988)
- Elastokovitch (music by Shostakovich) (1989)
- The Last Dance (music by Ravel) (1989)

=== 1990s ===
- Camille (music by Verdi, arranged by Allan Stephenson) (1990)
- Eine Kleine Nachtmusik (music by Mozart) (1990)
- The Nutcracker (music by Tchaikovsky) (1991)
- Hamlet (music by Peter Klatzow]) (1992)
- A Midsummer Night's Dream (music by Mendelssohn) (1993)
- Sylvia in Hollywood (music by Allan Stephenson) (1993)
- Walpurgisnacht (music by Gounod) (1993)
- The Rain Queen (music by Gustav Mahler) (1995)
- The Story of Manon Lescaut (music by Massenet) (1997)
- Daphnis & Chloe (music by Ravel) (1998)
- Work in Progress (music by Tchaikovsky) (1998)
- Cleopatra (music by Charl-Johan Lingenfelder) (1999)
