= Adriaan Theodoor Peperzak =

Dutch philosopher (born 1929)

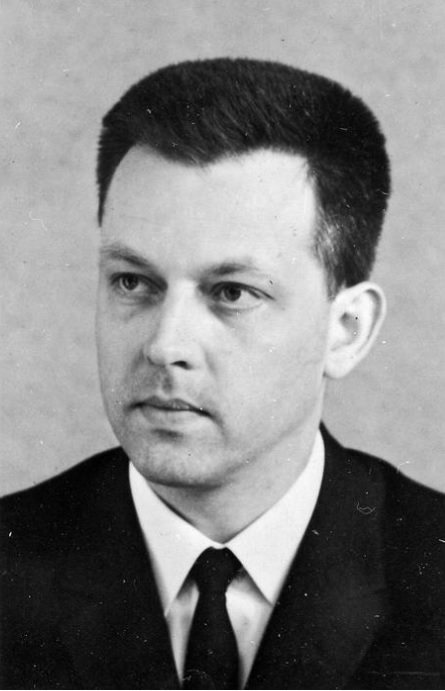
- Professor Peperzak in 1967
- Born: 3 July 1929 (age 96); Malang, East Java, Dutch East Indies

Academic background
- Thesis: Le jeune Hegel et la vision morale du monde (1960)

Academic work
- Era: 20th century Philosophy
- Region: Western philosophy
- School or tradition: Continental
- Main interests: Ethics, Christian philosophy, philosophy of Hegel and Emmanuel Levinas

Adriaan Theodoor Basilius (Ad) Peperzak (born 3 July 1929) is a Dutch educator, editor and philosophical author. Peperzak was the president of Hegel Society of America from 2010 to 2012.

== Biography ==
Peperzak was born on the island of Java (Indonesia) as a Dutch citizen. He studied philosophy at the Franciscan monastery schools in Venray, and theology in La Verna and Weert (in the Netherlands). He obtained a licentiate in philosophy at the Higher Institute of Philosophy of the Université catholique de Louvain in Louvain (Belgium) and a Ph.D. in the Humanities at the University of Paris (Sorbonne) in Paris. His Ph.D. dissertation Le jeune Hegel et la vision morale du monde (director: Paul Ricoeur), was published in 1960 and republished in 1969.

== Work ==
Peperzak's research in the history of philosophy has focused on Hegel (six books and numerous articles) and Emmanuel Levinas (two books and three others edited). He also published on Plato, Aristotle, Bonaventure, Descartes, Heidegger, and Ricoeur, and on thematic questions in ethics, social and political philosophy, metaphilosophy, and the philosophy of religion.

He is a member of the board of editors for Fordham University Press series Perspectives in Continental Philosophy. He is Arthur J. Schmitt Professor of Philosophy at Loyola University Chicago. Before, he was a professor at the Radboud University of Nijmegen (Department of Metaphysics & Epistemology), and at Utrecht University (History of Modern Philosophy) for several years.

== Bibliography ==
- Le jeune Hegel et la vision morale du monde (1960, 1969)
- Der heutige Mensch und die Heilsfrage (1972)
- Philosophy and Politics: A Commentary on the Preface to Hegel's Philosophy of Right (1987)
- Selbsterkenntnis des Absoluten: Grundlinien der Hegelschen Philosophie des Geistes. Spekulation und Erfahrung, Texte und Untersuchungen zum Deutschen Idealismus (1987)
- Hegels praktische Philosophie: Ein Kommentar zur enzyklopädischen Darstellung der menschlichen Freiheit und ihre objektiven Verwirklichung (1991)
- To the Other: An Introduction to the Philosophy of Emmanuel Levinas (1993)
- Beyond: The Philosophy of Emmanuel Levinas (1997)
- Before Ethics (1997)
- Reason In Faith: On The Relevance Of Christian Spirituality For Philosophy (1997)
- Platonic Transformations (1997)
- Modern Freedom: Hegel's Legal, Moral, and Political Philosophy (2001)
- The Quest for Meaning: Friends of Wisdom, from Plato to Levinas (2003)
- Elements of Ethics (2003)
- Philosophy between Faith and Theology: Addresses to Catholic Intellectuals (2005)
- Thinking: From Solitude to Dialogue and Contemplation (2006)
- Aanspraak en Bezinning (2007)
