= Itzik Feffer =

Soviet Yiddish poet (1900–1952)

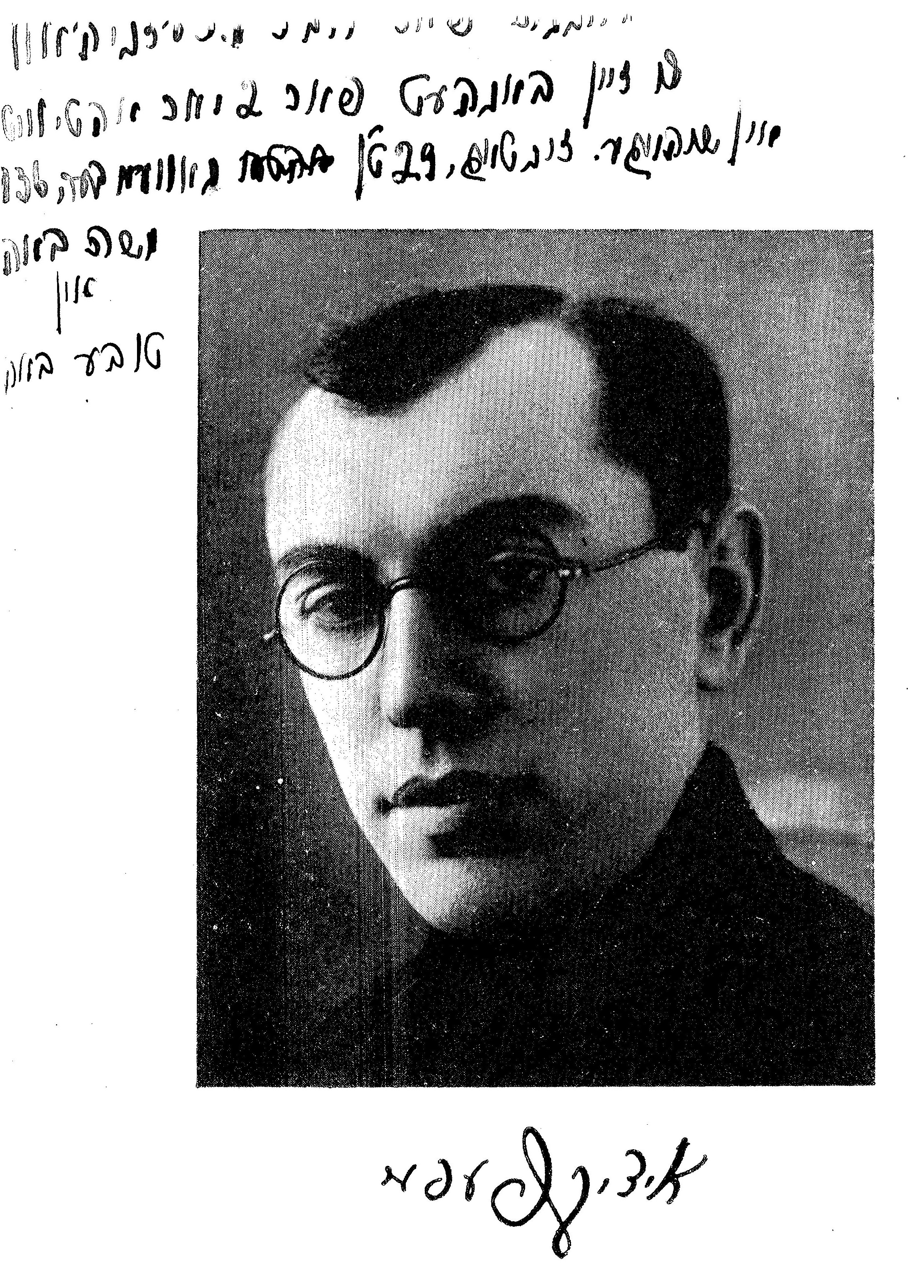
Itzik Fefer in the 1920s

Itzik Feffer (10 September 1900 – 12 August 1952), also Fefer (Yiddish: איציק פֿעפֿער, Russian: И́цик Фе́фер, Исаа́к Соломо́нович Фе́фер) was a Soviet Yiddish poet executed on the Night of the Murdered Poets during Joseph Stalin's late purges.

== Early life ==
Itzik Feffer was born in Shpola, a town in the Zvenigorodka uezd (district) of Kiev Governorate, in what was then part of the Russian Empire and is now part of today's Cherkasy Oblast in Ukraine. His father was a teacher of Hebrew and a poet, and served as his son's teacher. He was killed by the Nazis occupation government of Ukraine during the Second World War.

Feffer started working at a young age as a printer. In 1917 he joined the General Jewish Labour Bund and volunteered for the Red Army and fought in Ukraine. Captured by Anton Denikin's counterintelligence, he ended up in a Kyiv prison, from where he was released by armed workers.

== Soviet career ==
In 1919 he joined the Communist Party and was a member of it until his death. He edited literary and art magazines in Yiddish and took an active part in the life of writers' organizations in Ukraine and Moscow. He was a member of the Presidium of the Supreme Soviet of the Ukrainian Soviet Socialist Republic and the Supreme Soviet of the Soviet Union.

Feffer was well known as an enthusiastic supporter of communist ideology. The communist anthem The Internationale appears in a Yiddish version that became very popular, in the songbook he edited with Moisei Beregovsky, which was published in Kiev in 1938. Moreover, his published books "mark the major historical events of Soviet Jewish and general Soviet history."

Fefer was a prolific poet and essayist, but became better known both as a Communist poet and as an apparatchik when the Union of Soviet Writers was founded in 1934. He took leadership and was the main representative for Yiddish literature within the Union, having just finished editing the Almanakh fun yidishe sovetishe shrayber (Almanac of Soviet Yiddish Writers). He was prominent in Yiddish Communist circles in Ukraine, as editor from 1933 to 1937 of the Kiev periodical Farmest ("Challenge"; known as Sovetishe literatur [Soviet Literature] between 1938 and 1941).

As an agent of the secret police on the Jewish Anti-Fascist Committee (JAC) during World War II, Feffer and the chair of the committee, Solomon Mikhoels, traveled across the Americas and England to mobilize support for the Soviet Union's fight against Hitler. "For Feffer, solidarity with the Jewish people and allegiance to the Soviet Union were synonymous." His poetry reflected pride in both his Jewish heritage and the Soviet Union, a good example being his poem “Ikh bin a Yid” (I Am a Jew).

== Literary work ==
Feffer was a prolific poet who wrote almost exclusively in Yiddish, and at a young age became prominent in the Yiddish literary scene in Kiev. He began writing poems in 1918, and in 1922 joined the Vidervuks (New Growth) group of young literary Yiddish poets and writers mentored by Dovid Hofshteyn; his first published collection of poetry, titled "Shpener" (Splinters), brought him to prominence quickly. Gennady Estraikh comments that "[h]is poetry amalgamated the Kultur-lige poets' revolutionary romanticism with the propagandist objectives of the workers' movement." His approach to literature differed from over Soviet Yiddish poets of the 1920s avant-garde in that Fefer strove for a kind of plain clarity he called proste reyd (simple speech). This made his work attractive to editors and critics.

In 1919, as a member of the Red Army, he began writing for the Kyiv newspaper "Komunistishe fon" (Communist Banner) and was later published in the newspapers "Yugnt" (Youth), "Nye Zeit" (New Times), "Folks-Zeitung" (The People's Newspaper), "Shtern" (Star), "Ukraine", and "Proletarishe fon" (Proletarian Banner). His published works in Yiddish take up almost eighty volumes.

His poetry was strongly political, and Feffer remained a devout Communist until his death. Gennady Estraikh comments that "the romantic spirit of continuous revolution runs through his writing." In his early poems Feffer praised the revolution and the party. His poems were quickly published and earned him a senior position among Jewish Soviet writers. He remained strongly bound to his native Ukraine as well, where Jewish literary activity was flourishing in both Ukrainian and Yiddish, and during the Korenizatsiia movement of the Soviet Union in the 1920s and 1930s, Feffer, along with Shakne Epshtein and Oleksandr Finkel, published essays in Ukrainian about Yiddish and Jewish poets and writers in Ukrainian (not Yiddish) for the mainstream Ukrainian weekly Literaturnaya Gazeta (Literary Newspaper) and the monthly Chervonyi Shliakh (The Red Path). He wrote lyrics for political and "folk" songs, songs of nature, and songs of praise for the Jewish community in Birobidzhan. He also engaged in the study of literature, criticism and linguistic innovation, and was a prolific children's poet. His play Di zun fargeyt nisht (The Sun Doesn't Set) was staged by the Moscow State Jewish Theatre in 1947.

With the outbreak of World War II, the Nazi invasion of the Soviet Union, and the beginning of the mass extermination of the Jews, Feffer's poetry changed markedly in tone. He wrote anti-Nazi Jewish rallying songs and lamented the destruction of Eastern European Jewry. His epic poem Di Shotns fun Varshever Geto ("The Shadows of the Warsaw Ghetto") is a tribute to the 750 Jews who rebelled against the Nazi liquidation of the ghetto and gave their lives fighting tyranny in what came to be known as the Warsaw Ghetto Uprising.

His poems were widely translated into Russian and Ukrainian. He is considered one of the greatest Soviet poets in the Yiddish language and his poems were widely admired inside and outside Russia.

Some of his poems were translated into Hebrew and published in the literary press and in anthologies by translators such as Avraham Shlunsky, Samson Meltzer, Moshe Basuk, Uriel Ofek and others. No full volume of his poetry has yet been translated into Hebrew in its entirety.

== Activities during World War II ==
After the Second World War broke out, he was evacuated to Ufa. Feffer enlisted in the Red Army for the second time, serving as a military reporter with the rank of colonel. He was also vice chairman of the Jewish Anti-Fascist Committee and, with Solomon Mikhoels, toured the United States, Mexico, Canada, and the United Kingdom in 1943 to win popular support and raise money for the Soviet Union, broadcasting the message that antisemitism no longer existed in the Soviet Union.

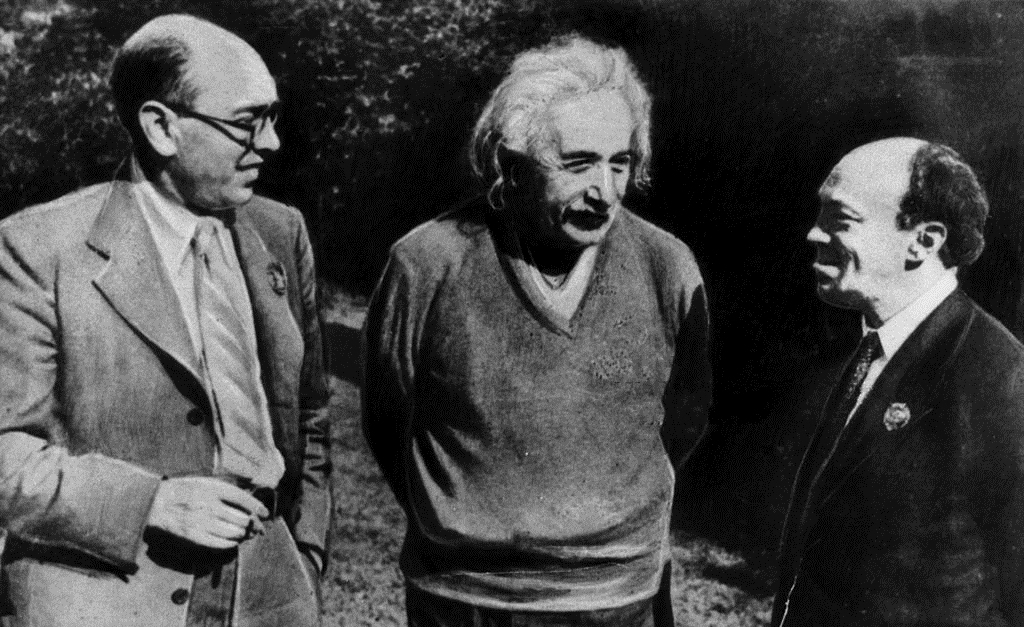
Itzik Feffer (left), Albert Einstein and Solomon Mikhoels in the United States in 1943.

In April 1942, he became deputy editor of the newspaper Eynikayt («Эйникайт» or "Unity") published by the JAC. In February 1944, together with Mikhoels and Shakne Epshtein, he signed a letter to Joseph Stalin with a request to organize an autonomous Jewish region in the Crimea.

Feffer closely collaborated with the NKVD and held secret meetings with Lavrentiy Beria to report on the activities and attitudes of the JAC's members; during the war, he was supervised by the deputy head of the NKVD's counterintelligence department, Leonid Raikhman. Mikhoels and other members of the JAC knew (or suspected) about Feffer's connections with the NKVD, but did not hide anything from him, believing they faced no jeopardy, since all the committee's activities were for the benefit of the state.

=== Arrest and death ===
In 1948, after the assassination of Mikhoels, Feffer, along with other JAC members, was arrested and accused of treason. Since Feffer had been an informer for the NKVD, he reportedly hoped he would be treated differently and cooperated with the investigation, not only providing false information that would lead to the arrest and indictment of over a hundred people, but implicating himself.

Efforts were made abroad to save him. The American concert singer and actor Paul Robeson had met Feffer on 8 July 1943, in New York during a Jewish Anti-Fascist Committee event chaired by Albert Einstein, one of the largest pro-Soviet rallies ever held in the United States. After the rally, Paul Robeson and his wife Eslanda Robeson befriended Feffer and Mikhoels.

Six years later, in June 1949, during the 150th anniversary of the birth of Alexander Pushkin, Robeson visited the Soviet Union to perform in concert. According to the American conservative author David Horowitz:

In America, the question "What happened to Itzik Feffer?" entered the currency of political debate. There was talk in intellectual circles that Jews were being killed in a new Soviet purge and that Feffer was one of them. It was to quell such rumours that Robeson asked to see his old friend, but he was told by Soviet officials that he would have to wait. Eventually, he was informed that the poet was vacationing in the Crimea and would see him as soon as he returned. The reality was that Feffer had already been in prison for a half year, and his Soviet captors did not want to bring him to Robeson immediately because he had become emaciated from lack of food. While Robeson waited in Moscow, Stalin's police brought Feffer out of prison, put him the care of doctors, and began fattening him up for the interview. When he looked sufficiently healthy, he was brought to Moscow. The two men met in a room that was under secret surveillance. Feffer knew he could not speak freely. When Robeson asked how he was, he drew his finger nervously across his throat and motioned with his eyes and lips to his American comrade. They're going to kill us, he said. When you return to America you must speak out and save us.

During his concert in Tchaikovsky Hall on 14 June - which was broadcast across the entire country - Robeson publicly paid tribute to Feffer and the late Mikhoels, singing the Fareynikte Partizaner Organizatsye song "Zog nit keyn mol" in both Russian and Yiddish. The song was met with a standing ovation from the hall.

Returning to the US, Robeson organized a letter in defense of Feffer, which was signed by writer Howard Fast and the then-chairman of the World Peace Council, French physicist Frédéric Joliot-Curie, among others. According to observers, Robeson's letter delayed Feffer's death by three years.

In 1952, however, Feffer, along with other defendants, was tried at a closed trial of JAC members, ostensibly due to their support of the American-backed proposal to establish an autonomous region for Jews in Crimea. Feffer realized during this trial, when the defendants pleaded not guilty and spoke about the methods by which the investigation was conducted, that he would not be spared, and retracted his testimony: "Investigator Likhachev told me: 'If we arrest you, then we will find the crime ... We will knock out everything we need from you.' So it turned out. I am not a criminal, but being very intimidated, I gave fictitious testimony against myself and others." Feffer also expressed pride in his Jewish identity.

The tribunal convicted him of giving "slanderous information about the situation of Jews in the USSR" to an American contact, as noted in a letter from Minister of State Security Semyon Ignatiev to the Secretary of the Central Committee of the CPSU Georgy Malenkov dated February 7, 1953. Feffer was executed on 12 August 1952 at the Lubyanka Building.

Feffer was rehabilitated posthumously in 1955, after Stalin's death; a cenotaph for him was installed at the Moscow Nikolo-Arkhangelsk cemetery. His poems have been reprinted in both Yiddish and Russian translation.

== Family ==
His wife Rakhil Gershkovna Kalish (1900–1982) was arrested on the night of January 13–14, 1949. His daughter Dora Isaakovna Fefer-Kalish (1924–2007) was arrested in 1952. Her husband Evel Moiseevich Klimovsky (1923–1992) was also repressed. His sister Daria (Dasha) Feffer was arrested at the same time as his wife.

=== Books of poetry ===
- Shpener (Splinters), 1922;
- Vegn zikh un azoyne vi ikh (About Me and Others Like Me), 1924;
- A shteyn tsu a shteyn (A Stone to a Stone), 1925;
- Proste reyd (Simple Words), 1925;
- Bliendike mistn (Blossoming Garbage), 1926, a paradoxical title about the revival of a shtetl in Soviet times;
- Gefunene funken (Found Sparkles), 1928;
- Gevetn (Competition), 1930;
- Plakatn af bronze (Posters in Bronze), 1932;
- Kraft (Force), 1937;
- Roytarmeyish 1943;
- Afsnay (Anew), 1948.
