= William T. Pheiffer =

American politician (1898–1986)

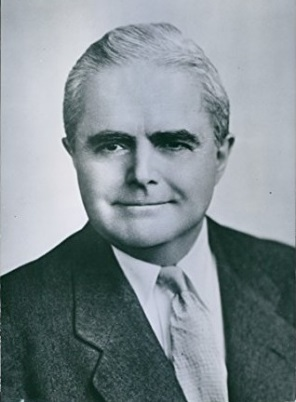
From the September 1953 edition of the Chi Phi Chakett magazine

William Townsend Pheiffer (July 15, 1898 – August 16, 1986) was an American lawyer, Republican politician and diplomat. He was a representative from New York in the 77th Congress and ambassador to the Dominican Republic.

== Biography ==
He was born in Purcell, Indian Territory (now Oklahoma), the son of William Pfeiffer (b. 1869) and Susan Garfinkel (b. 1869). His brother was Harry R. Pfeiffer (b. 1896). His father was a lawyer. His maternal uncle was Julius Garfinckel, wealthy merchant. He attended the public schools of Purcell, Ardmore and Oklahoma City, and the University of Southern California, where he was a member of the Chi Phi fraternity.

During World War I, Pheiffer served as a private in the cavalry of the U.S. Army, in 1918. He earned a law degree at the law school of the University of Oklahoma, in 1919. That same year, he was admitted to the bar and began working in general practice like his father. He practiced in Sayre, Oklahoma, from 1923 to 1926. In 1924, he was a candidate for the 2nd District in the Oklahoma Senate.

Pheiffer moved to Amarillo, Texas, in 1926, and continued the practice of law. In 1932, he was an alternate delegate from Texas at the Republican National Convention in Chicago, Illinois. He was a delegate to the Republican State conventions in 1936 and 1942.

In 1939, he moved to New York City. The following year, he was elected by a wide margin to represent the 16th Congressional District on the East Side of Manhattan in the 77th Congress, January 3, 1941 to January 3, 1943. Pheiffer was the first Republican to carry the district, defeating the Democratic incumbent, James Fay. He was defeated for reelection by Fay by 80 votes in 1942. The 16th District was merged with others in a 1944 reapportionment.

During World War II, Pheiffer entered the Army as a captain of the cavalry and served from March 12, 1943, to April 22, 1944. On August 1, 1944, he was appointed counsel to the Petroleum Administration for War, Washington, D.C., and served until February 8, 1945. He then resumed private practice as a member of the New York and Washington law firm of Pheiffer, Stephens & Weaver. He was also an executive assistant in charge of the New York headquarters of the Republican National Committee from 1945 to 1948.

President Eisenhower appointed Pheiffer the Ambassador to the Dominican Republic on May 28, 1953. His full title was Ambassador Extraordinary and Plenipotentiary and his presentation of credentials took place on June 29.

On March 20, 1954, he was married in the fashionable Everglades Club in Palm Beach, Florida, to Frances Margaret Laacke (September 30, 1892 – July 8, 1993) (She was first married to and divorced from physician Samuel G. Higgins; she then married and became the widow of Milwaukee brewer/real estate dealer George E. Uihlein).

Pheiffer then returned with his bride to the Dominican Republic and they took up residence together at the U.S. Embassy in Ciudad Trujillo (now Santo Domingo). He served at his post as envoy until June 2, 1957. He and his wife then returned to New York, where he carried on his practice of law. At his death, his law office was at 645 Madison Avenue.

He died at age 88 at his home in New York City.

== See also ==
- United States House of Representatives
- New York's congressional delegations
- Ambassadors from the United States

U.S. House of Representatives
Preceded by James H. Fay	Member of the U.S. House of Representatives from New York's 16th congressional district January 3, 1941–January 3, 1943	Succeeded by James H. Fay
Diplomatic posts
Preceded by Phelps Phelps	United States Ambassador to the Dominican Republic; June 29, 1953–June 2, 1957	Succeeded by Joseph S. Farland
