= Cape Town City Ballet =

Dance company based in Cape Town, South Africa

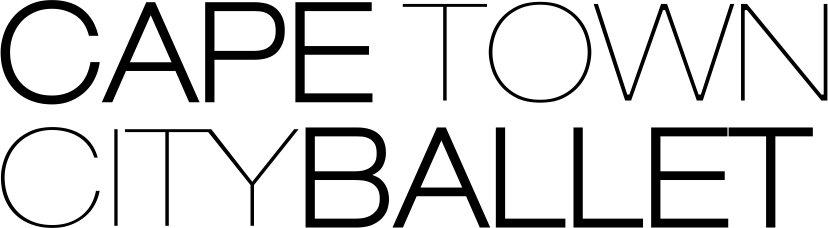
Logo of the Cape Town City Ballet

The Cape Town City Ballet Company, formerly known as the CAPAB Ballet Company, is a dance company based in Cape Town, South Africa.

== History ==
The Cape Town City Ballet originated from the UCT Ballet Company, which was established by Dulcie Howes in 1934. Dr. Howes was adamant that this dance company would give opportunity to talented individuals, irrespective of race or color. The Company was involved in the founding of Maynardville Open-Air Theatre on 1 December 1950, with its opening performance of Les Sylphides. In 1963 the Cape Town City Ballet Company took over management of the Maynardville theater's ballet performances. The company became the CAPAB (Cape Performing Arts Board) Ballet Company under the directorship of David Poole.

The company initially benefited from government spending on the arts; its 60-strong company staged lavish productions at the Artscape Theatre Centre (previously known as the Nico Malan in Cape Town), toured to the 1820 Settlers National Monument Theatre in Grahamstown, the Civic Theatre in Johannesburg, and the Port Elizabeth Opera House. Funding from the government stopped in 1994. In 1997 the company became Cape Town City Ballet, a non-profit organization under the leadership of Elizabeth Triegaardt. Professor Triegaardt was both the executive director of the company and the director of the UCT School of Dance.

Professor Triegaardt remained on the Board of Directors for the Cape Town City Ballet until April 2019. Afterwards, former principal ballerina, Tracy Li filled the position of Acting Executive Director from April to September 2018. Debbie Turner, the current CEO, took office in 2018. She is no longer involved with the company.

Since 2024, Tracy Li has been Head of Artistic.

== Notable members ==
- Johnny Bovang, former senior principal
- Gary Burne
- John Cranko
- Eduard Greyling, danseur noble
- Tracy Li, former senior principal
- Keith Mackintosh, former principal and ballet master
- Veronica Paeper
- David Poole, late artistic director and ballet master
- Daniel Rajna, former principal
- Phyllis Spira, prima ballerina assoluta
- Frank Staff
- Brooke Lynn Hytes, runner-up on the eleventh season of Rupaul's Drag Race

== Guest artists ==
These have included the following dancers:

- Petrus Bosman
- Desmond Doyle
- Thomas Edur
- Margot Fonteyn
- Carla Fracci
- Beryl Grey
- Attilio Labis
- Nadia Nerina
- Agnes Oaks
- Alexis Rassine
- Wayne Sleep
- Maina Gielgud
- Vadim Muntagirov

== Repertoire ==
Cape Town City Ballet mainly performs versions of traditional classics reworked by resident choreographer, Veronica Paeper.

=== 2021 ===
- ALCHEMY – THREE DANCES featuring Robert North’s TROY GAME, George Balanchine’s CONCERTO BAROCCO and Jiří Kylián’s FALLING ANGELS
- CARMEN – choreography by Veronica Paeper
- INGOMA – choreography by South African born Mthuthuzeli November. Commissioned by Cassa Pancho for Ballet Black in London.
- LES SYLPHIDES choreography by Mikhail Fokine. Staged by Lynn Wallis.
- SERENADE – choreography by George Balanchine.
- CAPE TOWN CITY BALLET – BACK ON STAGE featuring George Balanchine’s SERENADE and MOON BEHIND THE CLOUDS, a suite of works made during the time of Covid-19, by South African choreographers Veronica Paeper, Kirsten Isenberg, Yaseen Manuel, Lindy Raizenberg and Marlin Zoutman.

=== 2020 ===
- CAPE TOWN CITY BALLET – BACK ON STAGE featuring George Balanchine’s SERENADE and MOON BEHIND THE CLOUDS, a suite of works made during the time of Covid-19, by South African choreographers Veronica Paeper, Kirsten Isenberg, Yaseen Manuel, Lindy Raizenberg and Marlin Zoutman.

=== 2019 ===
- A CHRISTMAS CAROL – THE STORY OF SCROOGE – choreography by Veronica Paeper
- SATORI – featuring Kenneth Tindall’s POLARITY. Michelle Reid’s SHEEPLE, and George Balanchine’s CONCERTO BAROCCO.
- SLEEPING BEAUTY – featuring guest artists Vadim Muntagirov, (The Royal Ballet) and Tatiana Melnik (Hungarian National Ballet) and Precious Adams (English National Ballet and Andile Ndlovu (Washington Ballet). Staged by Denise Schultze Godfrey.AMARANTH – featuring George Balanchine’s Serenade, Frank Staff ‘s Transfigured Night and Christopher L Huggins’ Enemy Behind the Gates

=== 2012 ===
- Two Ballets performed at Maynardville Open-Air Theatre- Kenneth MacMillan's Solitaire and David Lichine's Graduation Ball
- Giselle with guest artists Daria Klimentová and Vadim Muntagirov

=== 2011 ===
- Poetry in Motion 2 - the production of 2010 was supplemented by additional dance vignettes created by well-known choreographers, including Adele Bank, Robin van Wyk, Erica Brumage, Lindy Raizenberg and Veronica Paeper
- Swan Lake
- The Sleeping Beauty

=== 2010 ===
- The Sleeping Princess
- Aquaballet - the second act of Swan Lake and other ballets appropriate to the setting of The Waterfront
- The Firebird
- Ballet Bonanza - highlights of the classics, including the popular Les Sylphides and Le Corsaire pas de deux, and extracts from Sheherazade, Flower Festival in Genzano and La Bayadere
- Veronica Paeper's Poetry in Motion (premiere)
- Carmen, also by Paeper

=== 2009 ===
- The Nutcracker with guest artist Eduard Greyling
- La Sylphide
- Swan Lake to celebrate the company's 75th Birthday
- Paquita
- Giselle
- Balletscapes - premiere of African Landscapes, and includes Paquita and excerpts from the popular works of Paeper, Poole, Prokovsky and others in the programme

=== 2008 ===
- Giselle
- Summer Spectacular - solos and pas de deux from Concerto, Don Quixote, Le Corsaire, Paquita, Giselle and Bacchanale as well as Sean Bovim's Tango Nights
- Coppélia
- The Merry Widow with guest artists Elza Leimane and Raimond Martinov
- Winter Spectacular - solos and pas de deux from Don Quixote, Le Corsaire and Paquita as well as the premiere of Christopher Kindo's Dark Secrets
- The Ugly Duckling
- Ballet Mosaic - solos and pas de deux from Spartacus, Sheherazade and Raymonda
- Romeo and Juliet with guest artists Elza Leimane and Raimond Martinov
- Christmas Classics

=== 2007 ===
- David Poole's Kami and Sean Bovim's Tango Nights
- Carmen with guest artist Jonathan Ollivier
- Camille, by Veronica Paeper, based on The Lady of the Camellias
- Dancing for the Children (charity ballet gala featuring the Royal Ballet's principal dancer Mara Galeazzi, and guest artists from the London Royal Ballet) - extracts from Romeo and Juliet, Two Pigeons, Elite Syncopations and La Sylphide as well as the South African premiere of Hans van Manen's Trois Gnossiennes
- Ballet Magic — featuring Nomvula – After the Rain, Tango Nights and excerpts from act 3 of The Nutcracker
- Cape Town City Ballet Celebrates 10 Years (tribute to Phyllis Spira and Eduard Greyling) — scenes from La Bayadère as well as Adele Blank's Mad Dogs, Robin van Wyk's Nomvula, After the Rain and the premiere of Sean Bovim's Tanzanite Ten with extracts from his Tango Nights and Queen at the Ballet. Hans van Manen's Trois Gnossiennes and the pas de deux from Kenneth MacMillan's Concerto were also performed.
- Queen at the Ballet
- James Bond 007 - the Ballet
- Orpheus in the Underworld

=== 2006 ===
- Carmen
- The Sleeping Beauty with guest artists Thomas Edur and Agnes Oaks
- SwingTime at the Ballet
- Queen at the Ballet
- Giselle
- Ballets Nouveaux - Rudi van Dantzig's Four Last Songs and Pas de Six, Lindy Raizenberg's Like So, Robert North's Entre Dos Aguas, while guest artistes from the Cuban National Ballet, Veronica Corveas and Jose Losada performed Diana and Actaeon.
- Nomvula – After The Rain — premiere to music of South African rock group Freshlyground
- Ballets al Fresco - Rudi van Dantzig's Four Last Songs and Robert North's Entre Dos Aguas
- The Nutcracker

=== 2005 ===
- Swan Lake Act 2 and Summer Waltzes - with scenes from Coppélia, The Sleeping Beauty and The Nutcracker
- Queen at the Ballet
- Viva Veronica - tribute to choreographer Veronica Paepar. Scenes from her works: Carmen, Orpheus in the Underworld, Concerto for Charlie, Ten Pieces, Emperor Waltz
- The Sleeping Beauty
- Cinderella
- Spring Selection - Veronica Paeper's Concerto for Charlie and Robin van Wyk's Ensemble for Six
- Robin Hood
- Let me Entertain You (premiere)

=== 2004 ===
- SwingTime at the Ballet (premiere)
- Les Sylphides
- Firebird
- Celebration - Adele Blank's Syzygy, George Balanchine's Rubies and Heinz Spoerli's All Shall Be
- Giselle
- Anna Karenina with guest artist Tanja Graafland
- Gala Evening with guest artists — Thomas Edur and Agnes Oaks (Don Quixote pas de deux), Desire Samaai and Jonathan Ollivier (pas de deux from Romeo and Juliet and A Midsummer Night's Dream), as well as highlights from the company's repertoire over the past seventy years.
- Queen at the Ballet (premiere)
- Orpheus in the Underworld
- SwingTime and More

=== 2003 ===
- Don Quixote with guest artists Agnes Oaks and Thomas Edur
- Swan Lake
- Classic Highlights - excerpts from ballets such as Raymonda, Carmen, The Sleeping Beauty and Spartacus
- Cinderella
