= Elizabeth Triegaardt =

South African ballet dancer, now retired (born 1946)

- Born: 28 September 1946 (age 79); Pretoria, South Africa
- Occupation: Ballet dancer

Elizabeth Triegaardt (born 28 September 1946) is a South African ballet dancer, now retired. She is professor emerita of the University of Cape Town School of Dance and an honorary executive director of the Cape Town City Ballet.

== Early life, education, and training ==
Elizabeth Triegaardt was born in Pretoria where she began dancing at a young age. Later she trained with the leading dance teachers in Johannesburg, studying ballet with Ivy Conmee and Marjorie Sturman and Spanish dance with Mercedes Molina. She matriculated from Hyde Park High School in Johannesburg and graduated from the University of Cape Town, with a bachelor of science degree in pure mathematics, in 1966. That same year she was awarded a Solo Seal by examiners from the Royal Academy of Dance. In addition to her concentration on ballet, she was an active member of the Spanish Dance Society and the Imperial Society of Teachers of Dance (Greek).

== Performing career ==
In 1967, Triegaardt joined CAPAB Ballet, named for the Cape Performing Arts Board and formerly known as the University of Cape Town Ballet. She became a principal dancer and later, in 1971, ballet mistress of the company. With it, she toured extensively to major cities in South Africa and South West Africa (now Namibia). Among the many roles she performed until her retirement from the stage in 1990 are the following.

- 1967. Swan Lake, produced by David Poole, music by Pyotr Ilyich Tchaikovsky, Role: Odette/Odile, partnered by Eduard Greyling.
- 1968. La Famille: The Intimate Recollections of an Elderly Aunt, choreography by Dulcie Howes, music by William Walton. Roles: Hortense and Waltz, partnered by Keith Mackintosh.
- 1968. The Two Pigeons, choreography by Frederick Ashton, music by André Messager. Role: The Young Girl.
- 1969. La Bayadère, produced by Gary Burne, music by Ludwig Minkus. Role: Nikiya, partnered by Eduard Greyling.
- 1970. The Sleeping Beauty, produced by David Poole, music by Pyotr Ilyich Tchaikovsky. Role: Aurora, partnered by Eduard Greyling.
- 1971. Transfigured Night, choreography by Frank Staff, music by Arnold Schoenberg. Role: Elder Sister.
- 1971. Missa Flamenca, choreography by Marina Keet, music by Manuel Lillo Torregrosa. Role: The Gloria.
- 1972. Giselle, produced by David Poole, music by Adolphe Adam. Role: Myrtha, Queen of the Wilis.
- 1973. Pictures at an Exhibition, choreography by Audrey King, music by Modest Mussorgsky. Role: Baba Yaga.
- 1973. John the Baptist, choreography by Veronica Paeper, music by Ernest Bloch. Role: Herodias.
- 1973. The Rain Queen, conception by Frank Staff, choreography by David Poole, music by Graham Newcater. Role: Princess, partnered by Eduard Greyling and Keith Macintosh.
- 1974. The Firebird, choreography by David Poole, music by Igor Stravinsky. Role: The Firebird, partnered by Eduard Greyling and Keith Macintosh.
- 1975. Cinderella, choreography by Veronica Paeper, music by Sergei Prokofiev. Role: Fairy Godmother.
- 1977. Raymonda, choreography by Alfred Rodrigues, music by Alexander Glazunov. Role: Raymonda, partnered by John Simons.
- 1979. Concerto for Charlie, choreography by Veronica Paeper, music by Dmitri Shostakovich. Role: Charlie Girl.
- 1980. Drei Diere (Three Beasts), choreography by Veronica Paeper, music by Peter Klatzow. Role: Sphinx.
- 1982. Orpheus in the Underworld, choreography by Veronica Paeper, music by Jacques Offenbach. Role: Hera.
- 1983. Undine, choreography by Veronica Paeper, music by Claude Debussy. Role: Undine.
- 1984. Spartacus, choreography by Veronica Paeper, music by Aram Khatchaturian. Role: Aegina.

== Later life ==
In 1986, while still performing with CAPAB Ballet, Triegaardt was appointed director of the University of Cape Town School of Dance. In addition to strengthening the program of training in classical ballet, she introduced contemporary dance and African dance majors to reflect the diversity of theatrical dance forms that had emerged in cities and towns around the country. The degree programme offered under her aegis was the first one recognized in South Africa. From 1997 to 2004, as the executive chairman of the Cape Town City Ballet, she was an effective advocate for preserving the classical repertory and for encouraging the work of South African choreographers. In 2011, she retired from her post as head of the university dance department but continued to host a weekly programme on Fine Music Radio called Invitation to the Dance. She served as the honorary executive director of Cape Town City Ballet until 2018.

== Awards ==
In 1975, Triegaardt received the Nederburg Prize for her contribution to ballet, with specific mention of her performance of the Lilac Fairy in David Poole's production of The Sleeping Beauty. In 2003, she received an award from the Western Cape premier, Ebrahim Rasool, for meritorious service to the arts in the province. She received a second award from the Western Cape Department of Cultural Affairs and Sport in 2009, and her third in 2017. In July 2019 Triegaardt received her Fellowship Award for lifetime services to classical dance and the Royal Academy of Dance, awarded by Dame Darcy Bussell at the graduation ceremony for the Academy in London.
