= Phyllis Spira =

South African Prima Ballerina Assoluta (1943 - 2008)

- Born: 18 October 1943; Johannesburg, South Africa
- Died: 11 March 2008 (aged 64); Cape Town, South Africa
- Occupation: Ballet dancer
- Spouse: Philip Boyd
- Parent(s): Lazar Spira and Fanny Pauline Rosen

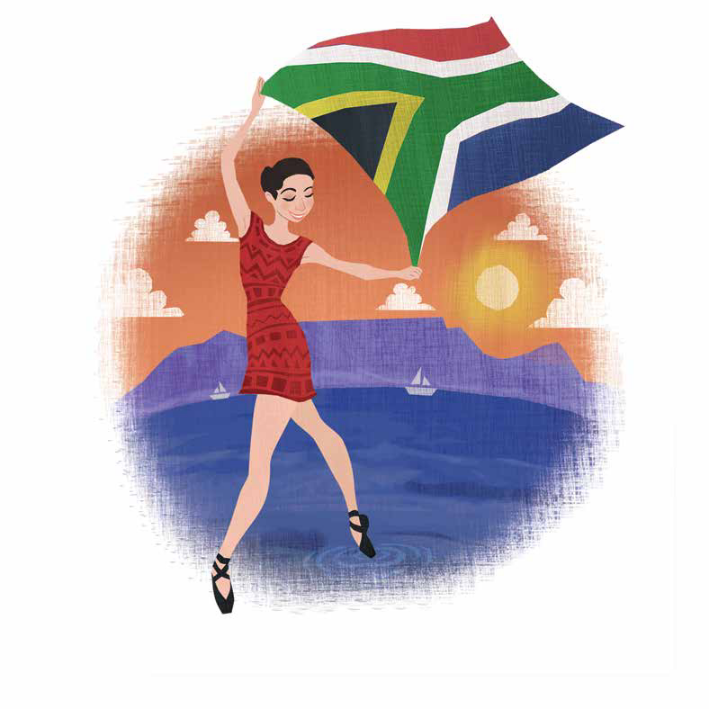
Drawing of the book "A Dancer’s Tale", about the life of Spira.

Phyllis Spira (18 October 1943 – 11 March 2008) was a South African ballet dancer who began her career with the Royal Ballet in England. Upon returning to South Africa, she spent twenty-eight years as prima ballerina of CAPAB Ballet, a professional company in Cape Town named for the Cape Performing Arts Board. In 1984 she was named the first (and currently only) South African Prima Ballerina Assoluta.

== Early life and training ==
Born in Johannesburg, Phyllis Bernice Spira was the first daughter and second child of Lazar and Fanny Pauline (Rosen) Spira, working-class parents who lived in a modest home in the pleasant suburb of Orange Grove. When she was 4 years old, little Phyllis was enrolled in ballet classes, where, even at that tender age, she showed talent for dancing. After attending a Hebrew nursery school, she was educated at Orange Grove Primary School and Waverly High School for Girls, where ballet classes and training for eisteddfods were extracurricular activities. When she was 15, her headmistress, recognizing her exceptional talent, obtained official permission for her to leave school at the end of the tenth grade to pursue her dance training. Soon thereafter, she was offered a chance to attend the Royal Ballet School in London. Despite her parents' concern at the prospect of their teenage daughter living alone in a great foreign city, she was allowed to take the chance.

Having arrived in London in May 1959, Spira began training at the Royal Ballet School when she was just 16. Her special qualities of movement soon caused favorable comment. Ninette de Valois, director of the school, referred to her as "a baby Markova," comparing her to the famous British ballerina Alicia Markova. Awarded a scholarship, Spira progressed quickly through the course of study. After only a few months, she made her debut in a performance of Swan Lake at Covent Garden, dancing in the pas de trois in act 1, as a cygnet in acts 2 and 4, and in the Neapolitan Dance in act 3. Thereupon she was invited to join the Royal Ballet touring company. She was 17 years old at the time.

== Professional career ==
=== England ===
Spira remained with the touring group of the Royal Ballet for three years, from 1960 to 1963. Promoted to soloist in 1961, she danced in performances in the English provinces, continental Europe, Scandinavia, the Middle East, and the Far East, making occasional appearances on television in England and Japan. Among the featured and leading roles in her repertory were the pas de trois in Frederick Ashton's Les Rendezvous and Kenneth MacMillan's Danses Concertantes, the title role in John Cranko's Pineapple Poll, and Phyllis in Alan Carter's Toccata, a role created especially for her in 1962. A promising future lay before her, but her longing for home made her decide to return to South Africa in 1964.

=== South Africa ===
In 1963, the South African government had established four professional ballet companies, one in each of the four provinces. The two most vigorous were PACT Ballet, named for the Performing Arts Council of the Transvaal, in Johannesburg, and CAPAB Ballet, named for the Cape Performing Arts Board, in Cape Town. Upon returning to her home town, Spira joined PACT Ballet, under the direction of Faith de Villiers, soon after it was formed. During her brief tenure with this new, young company, she danced leading roles in Swan Lake, Giselle, Sylvia, and Casse Noisette (The Nutcracker). An unfortunate salary dispute led to her defection, along with her frequent partner Gary Burne, to the company in Cape Town.

Spira and Burne joined CAPAB Ballet as its principal dancers in 1965, leaving it temporarily in 1967-1968 and moving to Toronto to dance with the National Ballet of Canada, directed by Celia Franca. After touring North America with this company, they returned to South Africa at the end of 1968 and rejoined CAPAB Ballet. They performed as a popular partnership until Burne left the company in 1971. Thereafter, she formed another partnership with strikingly handsome Eduard Greyling, which lasted for some seventeen years, until she retired from the stage.

Spira's repertory ranged widely, varying from the lyrical (Les Sylphides) to the dramatic (Romeo and Juliet) to the technically spectacular (Don Quixote). Her musicality, theatrical intelligence, and sense of humor enabled her to interpret disparate roles with great finesse. She danced the Betrayed Girl in The Rake's Progress, by de Valois; the Young Girl in The Two Pigeons, by Ashton; and the title role of Bournonville's La Sylphide, staged by Hans Brenaa. Among the several works that Burne choreographed for her were The Doves (1966), set to music by Aram Katchaturian, and The Birthday of the Infanta (1971), set to the music of Harry Partch. David Poole also created roles for her and, as artistic director of the company, cast her in many others. Besides classical ballet, Spira was a gifted Spanish dancer, appearing in Marina Keet's productions of The Three-Cornered Hat (1966), set to the famous score by Manuel de Falla, and Fiesta Manchega (1973), to music by Francisco Guerrero. In 1971, she danced the role of Salome in John the Baptist, set by Veronica Paeper to music by Ernest Bloch, and in 1976, she danced the title role in Judith, set by Alfred Rodrigues to music by Çetin Işiközlü.

Comparisons with Alicia Markova were persistent. Peter Williams, editor of Dance and Dancers, wrote that "Spira looked uncannily like Markova as well as having a flavor of Fonteyn, but with an approach of her own." Describing her as "reed-thin and tiny, with huge eyes dominating a gamine face," a writer for the New York Times also likened her to Markova, remarking that they shared "a classical purity of line and delicacy of style wedded to a steely technique." She continued to lead the Cape Town company until 1988, when an injury on the opening night of a new production of Giselle brought her dance career to an end.

== Honors and awards ==
Spira received numerous honors and awards during her long career. A two-time winner of the Nederburg Award for Ballet, she was also the recipient of the Lilian Solomon Award and the Bellarte Woman of the Year Award for the Cape Province in 1979, In 1984, she was granted the unusual title of prima ballerina assoluta by the president of South Africa. Following this rare honor, she received South Africa's highest civilian award for excellence, the Order for Meritorious Service, Gold. In 2000, she received the Molteno Medal from the Cape Tercentenary Foundation for lifetime service to the performing arts. In 2003, she was named a member of the Order of the Disa for her contribution to ballet and the development of ballet in disadvantaged communities.

== Later life ==
After leaving the stage in 1988, Spira served as principal ballet mistress of CAPAB Ballet until 1999, during which time the company was renamed as Cape Town City Ballet. She and her husband, Philip Boyd, a former CAPAB dancer whom she had married in 1986, had no children, so they devoted their energies to community service. Appointed head of the David Poole Trust Youth Training Program, she and Boyd ran the Dance for All program initiated by Poole some years earlier. Set up to take dance to underprivileged children living in non-white townships, it was active in Gugulethu, Nyanga, and Khayelitsha on the borders of Cape Town and in the rural inland areas of Barrydale and Montagu. The program reached more than seven hundred children each year.

After a foot injury in August 2007 in London, Spira underwent a series of operations on both her legs. Complications set in and she again underwent vascular surgery, which she did not survive. She died in a Cape Town hospital, aged 64.
