= Klimentov =

Klimentov (Russian: Климентов) is a Slavic masculine surname, its feminine counterpart is Klimentova. It may refer to

- Andrei Platonov, pen name of the Russian writer Andrei Klimentov (1899–1951)
- Daria Klimentová (born 1971), Czech ballet dancer, teacher and photographer
