= Nederburg awards =

The Nederburg awards for ballet and opera in South Africa were established in 1972. Previously, the arts across the South African provinces were assisted by the Stellenbosch Farmers' Wineries Trust, which commissioned drama, opera and ballet and offered bursaries to students. One of the ballets financed by the Trust was David Poole's Kami in 1976. The Oude Libertas Study bursary also allowed dancers such as Veronica Paeper, Dudley Tomlinson, June Hattersley to study overseas.

The Nederburg awards were established for opera in all four of South Africa's provinces, and for ballet in the Cape Province. Winners were granted R1 500, as well as a trophy.

== Recipients ==
=== Recipients of the award for ballet ===
These include:

- Phyllis Spira (1972, 1979)
- David Poole (1973)
- Peter Cazalet for his ballet designs (1974)
- Elizabeth Triegaardt (1975)
- John Simons (1976)
- Eduard Greyling (1977, 1983)
- Veronica Paeper (1980, 1982)
- Keith Mackintosh (1981)
- Nicolette Loxton (1986, 1987)
- Joseph Clark (1988)
- Linda Lee (1996)
- Tracy Li (1997)
- Philip Boyd (1997)
- Mary Ann de Wet (1999)
- Robin van Wyk
- Tanja Graafland
- Peter Klatzow for the ballet Hamlet
- Aubrey Meyer for the ballet Exequy

=== Recipients of the award for opera ===
These include:

- Nellie du Toit (1973, 1975)
- Leo Quayle (1973)
- Gé Korsten (1975)
- Hendrik Hofmeyr (1988)
- Gwyneth Lloyd
- Lawrence Folley
- Rouel Beukes
- Sidwill Hartman
- Juan Burgers
- Vetta Wise
- Ros Conrad
- Michael Renier (2002)
