= Lindup =

Lindup is a surname. Notable people with the surname include:

- David Lindup (1928–1992), English composer, arranger and orchestrator
- Ernest Lindup, South African World War I flying ace
- Janet Lindup, South African ballet dancer
- Mike Lindup (born 1959), British musician

== See also ==
- Lindup, British Columbia, Canada, a ghost town
