= Gary Burne =

Rhodesian dancer and choreographer (1934–1976)

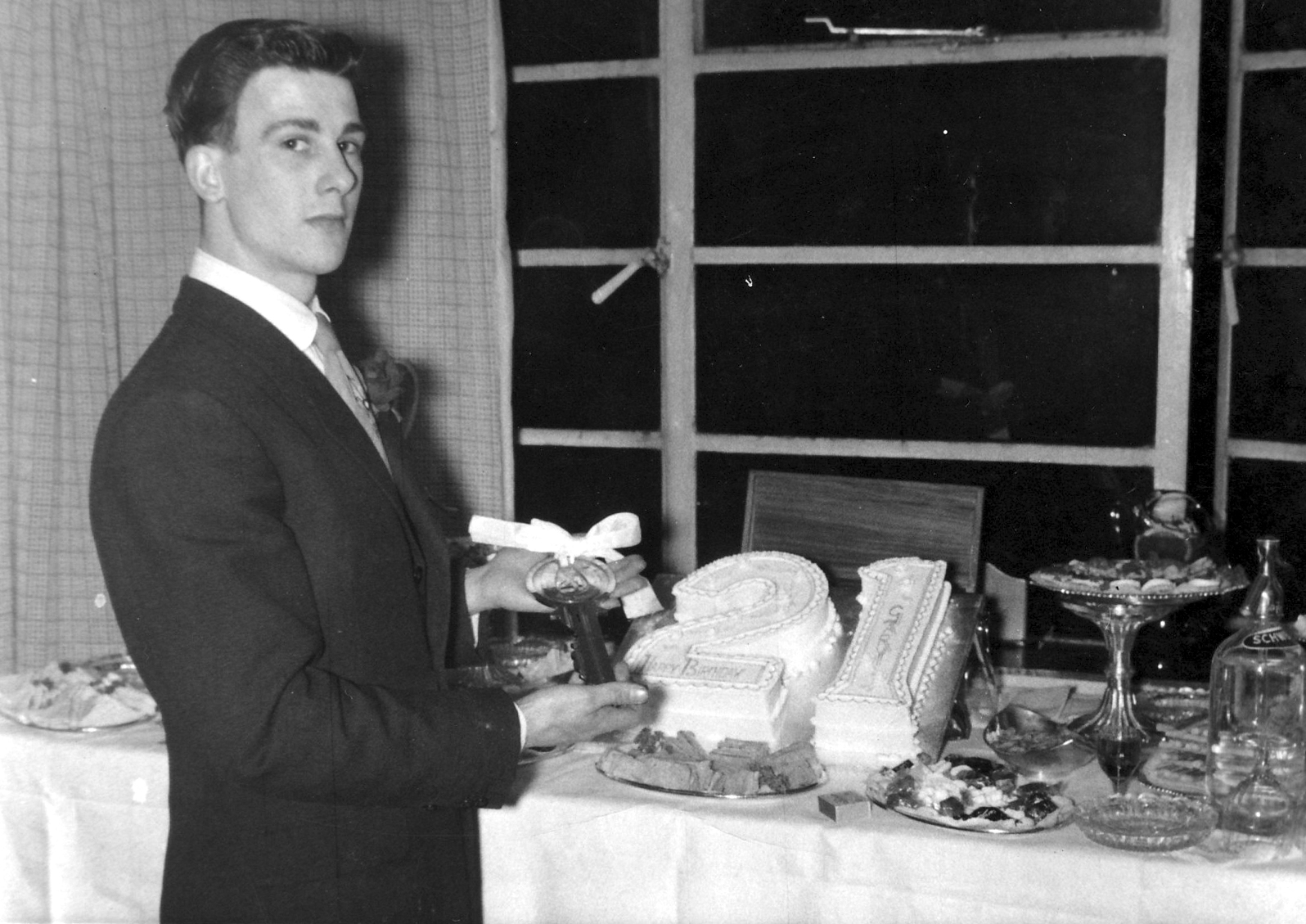
Gary Burne age 21.

Gary Burne (20 April 1934 – 26 August 1976) was a Rhodesian dancer, ballet master, and choreographer who spent ten years with the Royal Ballet in England before moving to South Africa to dance with ballet companies in Johannesburg and Cape Town. He also danced for a period in Toronto, Canada.

== Early life and training ==
Algernon de Blois Hayes-Hill was born in Bulawayo, an industrial center in Matabeleland, a district of the self-governing British Crown colony of Southern Rhodesia (now Zimbabwe). He began his dance training as a seven year old youth with Elaine Archibald, where his grandmother, tasked with his care during WWII, was the studio pianist.

He soon showed a facility for classical ballet. When Anton Dolin saw him in class, aged fifteen, during a visit to Southern Rhodesia, he suggested that Hayes-Hill would benefit from further training in London. Algernon's parents, Harry M Hayes-Hill and Una May (née Spurr) were of British and Canadian stock, supported him in his ambition to pursue a career as a professional dancer, and made it possible for him to travel to London in 1951.

He had one elder sibling, a brother, Terence Basil Hayes-Hill, whom became a prominent soldier in the unrecognised state of Rhodesia.

Once in London, he enrolled in classes with Ruth French and, after three months' study with her, auditioned, successfully, for admission to the Sadler's Wells Ballet School. The faculty there were favorably impressed. His command of classical technique, his height, his good looks, and his aristocratic bearing made him an ideal candidate for a danseur noble. After only one month's study at the school, he was invited to join the Sadler's Wells Ballet at Covent Garden.

== Professional career ==
Hayes-Hill joined the Sadler's Wells company late in 1951, and later became known under the stage name of Gary Burne, as his birth name Algernon de Blois Hayes-Hill, was deemed unsuitable for theatrical purposes.

He chose the surname Burne from his maternal Aunt's family, and the first name, Gary, was inspired by Gary Player, the South African golfer whom had just become the worlds youngest professional at age 17, as well as Gary Hocking, the future Southern Rhodesian Grand Prix motorcycle racing world champion, whom both were at the start of their careers; these Southern African personalities were prominent in world print media of that time.

=== Europe ===
After five years in the corps of Sadler's Wells Ballet, Burne was promoted to soloist in 1956, the same year that the company received a royal charter and changed its name to the Royal Ballet. In 1957, he created the role of King of the South in John Cranko's The Prince of the Pagodas, set to the music of Benjamin Britten, and danced a difficult variation in the act 3 pas de six. "With choreography mainly consisting of high jumps with open lines and then extremely fast beats in the coda," it always elicited applause. In 1958, he danced in the ensemble of Frederick Ashton's Ondine and appeared in other Ashton works in the repertory, including Symphonic Variations and Daphnis and Chloĕ. In 1959, he created the role of Eriocles in Cranko's Antigone, based on the tragedy by Sophocles and set to music by Mikis Theodorakis. Having gone on tours of the United States and Russia with the company, Burne danced for the first time in South Africa in 1960. His partners during these years included Rosella Hightower, Beryl Grey, and Antoinette Sibley.

In 1961, Cranko became director of the Stuttgarter Ballett, then a relatively obscure provincial troupe. At his request, Burne left England and moved to Germany to join the company as a principal dancer. There, appearing alongside leading dancers Marcia Haydée, Richard Cragun, and Ray Barra, Burne enjoyed considerable success. For eighteen months, he danced in new productions created by Cranko for the company, including Daphnis and Chloē and Romeo and Juliet (both 1962), as well as in ballets in the existing repertory. Under Cranko's direction, the company became Germany's leading ballet company within a very few years.

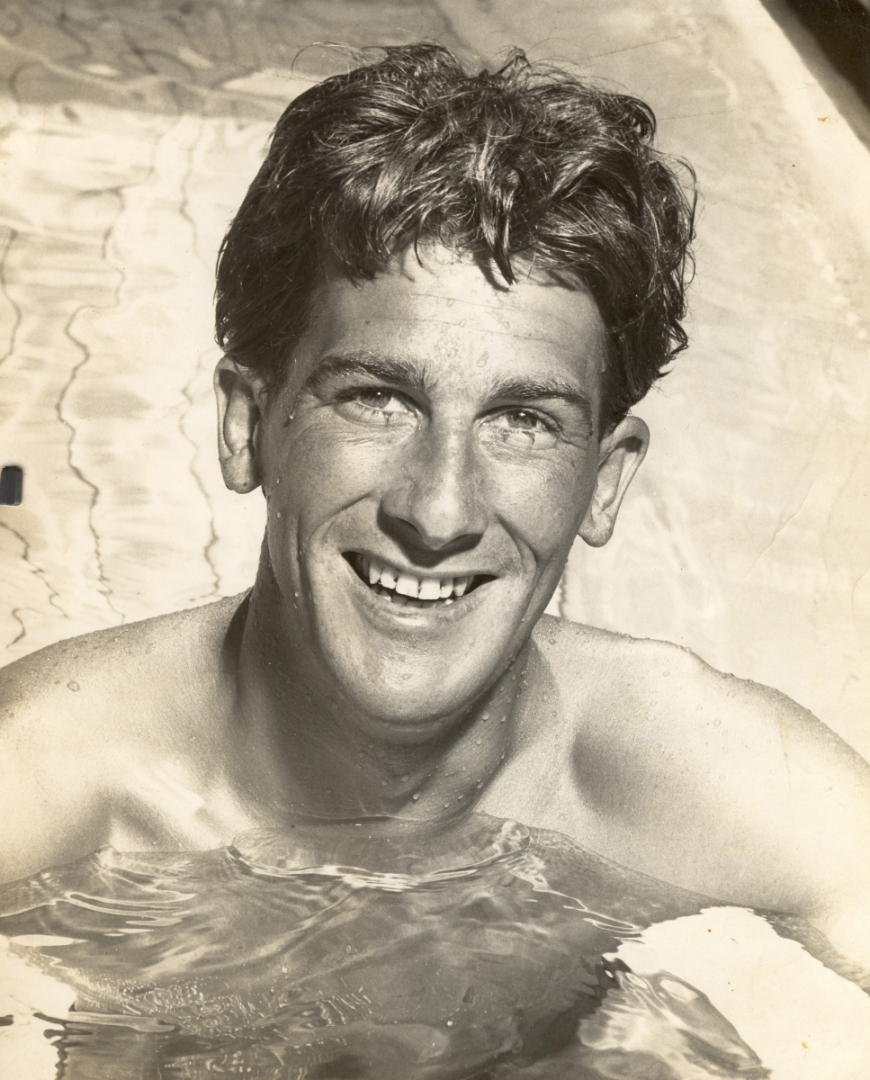
Gary Burne, Xmas 1968, Bulawayo, personal family photograph by Neil Hayes-Hill

=== Southern Africa ===
In 1963, the South African government had established four professional ballet companies, one in each of the four provinces. The two most vigorous were PACT Ballet, named for the Performing Arts Council of the Transvaal, in Johannesburg, and CAPAB Ballet, named for the Cape Performing Arts Board, in Cape Town. Burne was offered the post of ballet master and principal dancer for PACT Ballet, under the direction of Faith de Villiers, soon after it was formed. He was quick to accept the job. When renowned French ballerina Yvette Chauviré came to Johannesburg as guest artist, Burne danced as Albrecht to her famous interpretation of Giselle in April 1963. He also formed a fortuitous partnership with ballerina Phyllis Spira, as they seemed ideally suited to each other. With this new, young company they danced leading roles in Swan Lake, Sylvia, and Casse Noisette (The Nutcracker). Their stay in Johannesburg was brief, however, as an unfortunate salary dispute led to their defection to the company in Cape Town.

Spira and Burne joined CAPAB Ballet as its principal dancers in 1965, leaving it temporarily in 1967-1968 and moving to Toronto to dance with the National Ballet of Canada, directed by Celia Franca. After touring North America with this company, they returned to South Africa at the end of 1968 and rejoined CAPAB Ballet. When David Poole resigned as ballet master in March 1969, Burne was appointed in his stead, and when Poole returned and became artistic director in 1970, Burne was made resident choreographer, a post he held for two years. His most creative works were The Prodigal Son (1970), set to electronic music by Morton Subotnik; The Birthday of the Infanta (1971), made for Spira and set to the music of Harry Partch; and Variations within Space (1971), made for Linda Smit and set to music by Bach played on a synthesizer. In other works in the repertory, Burne and Spira performed as a popular partnership until he left the company in 1971.

Burne then moved to Paris and established himself as a free-lance choreographer, setting works for local companies in France and Germany. Engaged to produce Jesus Christ Superstar, the rock opera by Andrew Lloyd Webber and Tim Rice, he returned to Salisbury, Rhodesia, in late 1971. There he also mounted several works for the Rhodesian National Ballet, including Five Sisters, set to music by Béla Bartók, and Nongause, a ballet based on an African legend of the Xhosa people and set to music by Macbeth/Pickard. In 1973, he produced an enlarged version of Nongause for PACT Ballet, casting emerging ballerina Dawn Weller in one of her first important roles. He later worked at the Space Theatre in Cape Town, doing experimental choreography with Gisela Taeger-Berger.

== Personal life ==
Burne married Linda Smit, his colleague at CAPAB Ballet, in 1975. Their marriage was brief, however, as Burne died in Salisbury the very next year. Having developed an unshakeable drug habit, he committed suicide in August 1976. A flamboyant character and a gifted dancer, he was only 42 years old when he died.
