= Allan Stephenson =

South African composer (1949–2021)

Allan Stephenson (15 December 1949 – 2 August 2021) was a British-born South African composer, cellist and conductor.

== Life ==
Born in Wallasey, near Liverpool, he studied the cello in Manchester at the Royal Manchester College of Music before moving to Cape Town in 1973 to join the Cape Town Symphony Orchestra. He retained the position of associate principal cello until the CTSO closed in 1997. After landing in Cape Town on 13 January 1973, he quickly became involved teaching cello at SACS, and managed these two jobs until his fiancée Christine arrived from England to also teach at SACS. They were married in July 1973. He directed the UCT College Orchestra from 1978 to 1988 and taught as a part-time lecturer of both cello and composition at the University of Cape Town.

A successful and well-known composer in South Africa, he composed one act of the Mandela Trilogy, a three act opera documenting the three stages of Nelson Mandela's life. Mike Campbell and Peter Louis van Dijk composed the other two acts of this Naledi award-winning production. Stephenson has written over 110 works including a large number of instrumental and chamber pieces, three operas, two symphonies and concertos for Piano, Oboe and Piccolo. He is also noted for arranging a large number of ballets, including Tales of Hoffmann, La Traviata (adapted for ballet) and Camille for Cape Town City Ballet. He founded the Cape Town Chamber Orchestra and ran I Musicanti, a string chamber orchestra, for several seasons. He played cello and conducted the Cape Town Philharmonic Orchestra when it accompanied Cape Town City Ballet.

Stephenson died on 3 August 2021, at the age of 71.

== Works ==
=== Operas ===
- The dark tale (1991)
- Who killed Jimmy Valentine (1995), based on the novel with the same title by South African writer Michael Williams
- Animals, based on George Orwell's Animal Farm and written with Willem van der Walt and Michael Williams.

=== Orchestra ===
- Symphony no. 1 (1973)
- Symphony no. 2 (1975)
- A Cape Town overture (1978)
- Adagietto (1980)
- Sinfonietta (1987)
- A Durban overture (1988)
- A Bloemfontein overture (1991)
- A Johannesburg overture (1992)
- A Port Elizabeth overture (1996)
- A Pretoria overture (1997)
- Musica africana (2004)

=== Chamber orchestra ===
- Veni fantasia (1966)
- Concertant (1967)
- Two pieces (1969)
- Concerto (1970)
- Pofadder variations II (1983)
- Burlesque for double bass and orch. (1974)
- The STEPP out rag (1999)
- Morethetho wa machaba (2003)

=== Band ===
- A Bloemfontein overture (1989)
- The D.F. overture (1999)
- Sinfonietta (2001)
- Introduction and march afrique (2004)
- A day on the veld (2005)
- Visserania : a new hope

=== Concertos ===
- Concertos: oboe (with string orchestra) (1978), English horn (2000), clarinet (Concertino pastorale) (1983), bassoon (with string orchestra) (1989), soprano saxophone (1996), Flügelhorn (with string orchestra) (1991), horn (1988), trombone (1988), tuba (Concertino burlesco) (1982), cello (2004), double bass (2005)
- Youth concerto, tbn (2003)
- Concertinos for flute (with string orchestra) (1994), piccolo (with string orchestra) (1979), 2 bassoons (1999), guitar and bassoon (1996)
- Concerto grosso, 2 vln (1990)
- Youth concertino, pn (1999)
- Youth concertino, cl. or sop. sax (2001)
- Youth concerto, trb (2003)
- Cello concerto (2004)
- Double bass concerto (2005)

=== Toccatas ===
- Toccata for strings (1967)
- Toccata for 3 trumpets (1974)
- Toccata for 1 trumpet (1975)
- Toccata for brass and timpani (1976)
- Toccata festive for castanets (1976)
- Toccata exotica for marimba and orchestra (1984)
- Toccata sinfonica for castanets (1987)

=== Chamber music ===
- Divertimento for woodwind quintet (1977)
- Pofadder variations I, fl, ob, bsn (1977)
- Pofadder variations II, fl, ob, bsn (1977)
- Trio, fl, va, harp (1978)
- Trio, ob, vln, git (1978)
- Trio, strings (1985)
- Konzertstück, 6 bsns (1987)
- Brass quintet (1988)
- Suite, tuba (1990)
- Pofadder variations III, brass quintet (1991)
- Introduction and allegro, vln or va, piano (1992)
- Miniature quartet, string quartet (1992)
- Suite, double brass quintet (1994)
- Four pieces, tuba, piano (1994)
- String quartet no. 1 (1994)
- Divertimento, 3 bsns, contrabsn (1995)
- Introduction and allegro, sop. sax, string quartet (1996)
- Little music, 2 tubas (1996)
- Little suite for young bassoons, 4 bsns (1997)
- String quartet no. 2 (1997)
- Four for six, 6 vc (1998)
- Miniature quartet, ob, vln, va, vc (1998)
- Souvenir of Sevilla, 6 vc (1999)
- Miniature quartet, bsn, vln, va, vc (1999)
- Miniature quartet, fl, vln, va, vc (1999)
- Miniature quartet, cl, vln, va, vc (2000)
- Miniature quartet, cl; string trio arr. for piano (2000)
- Miniature quartet, hn, vln, va, vc (2000)
- Little suite, fl, vln va (2000)
- Concert piece, vc, piano (2000)
- String quartet no. 3 (2000)
- Duo, ob, bsn (2000)
- Diversions, guitar (2000)
- Trio, bsns (2001)
- Sonatina, vln, perc (2001)
- 3 pieces, bsn (2000)
- Miniature quartet, git, vln, va, vc (2003)
- Double reed suite, 2 ob, Eng. hn, 3 bsns, contrabsn
- String quartet no. 4 (2006)
- Mini-trio, 2 ob, Eng. hn (2007)
- Miniature quartet, pic, vln, va, vc (2008)
- The gnomus promenade, bsn, pn (2008)
- Miniature quartet, alto sax, vln, va, vc (2008)
- Symphonette, wind nonet (2011)
- Miniature quartet (2012), saxophone quartet
- Miniature quartet (2012), horn quartet
- Sonata for solo violoncello (2013)
- Miniature quartet, Eng. hn, string trio (2014)

=== Vocal music ===
- Jason and the grey witch, with narrator (1986)
- Alleluia, SATB, orch (1981); rev. SSAA, 2 pianos (1992)
- Gloria, SATB, organ (1976)
- Alleluia, SSAA, piano duet (1992)
