= Janet Lindup =

South African ballet dancer

- Born: 31 October; South Africa
- Occupation: Ballet dancer
- Spouse: Mark Nathan

Janet Lindup was a South African ballet dancer.

Lindup was former principal ballet dancer with CAPAB (since renamed the Cape Town City Ballet Company). Lindup was famed for partnerships with Jeremy Hodges and Johnny Bovang. Lindup retired from dancing in 1999 and now teaches pilates. She is married to Mark Nathan, a physiotherapist.
