= Leo Quayle =

South African conductor (1918–2005)

Leo Quayle (11 December 1918 - 19 May 2005) was a South African conductor described as the "South African maestro of music theatre."

== Early life ==
Quayle was born in Pretoria where he trained with his father, Leo Quayle snr., and Isadore Epstein. He conducted an orchestra for the first time at the age of fourteen, and conducted the Pretoria Juvenile Orchestra in 1934. He won the University of South Africa Scholarship for Piano in 1936. He took up this scholarship at the Royal College of Music in 1937, and returned after the end of the Second World War. He studied under Herbert Fryer and Constant Lambert at the Royal College of Music where he won the Stier Prize for conducting in 1939, and the Hopkinson Gold Medal in 1946. He spent the Second World War in South Africa as an organiser/director of the Union Defence Force Entertainment Unit.

== Career ==
During the 1940s and 1950s he was firstly the assistant and later the principal conductor at the Sadler's Wells Opera Company in London as well as one of the first music directors for the Welsh National Opera. He directed television operas, conducted ballet and film music at Denham Film Studios, and conducted various British orchestras including the London Symphony, Bournemouth Symphony and Hallé Orchestras. He was also a part-time professor at the Royal College of Music. He spent 1953 as the Chorus Master at Glyndebourne. He returned to South Africa to teach music at the Conservatorium of Music at the University of Stellenbosch, and was appointed professor of music at the University of the Orange Free State in 1958. Seen as "largely responsible for putting Bloemfontein on the musical map," he established both an orchestra and a string quartet in the city. In 1961 he was made an Honorary Fellow of the Royal College of Music, while in 1964 he became the director of Music and Opera for PACT in Johannesburg. He founded the PACT Orchestra in 1965 which accompanies PACT's Opera and PACT Ballet. He composed the music for the ballet La Fenêtre which was choreographed by Audrey King and performed by PACT Ballet in 1966. In 1973 he was awarded the Nederburg Prize for Opera. He was involved in conceptualising and planning the State Theatre in Pretoria which opened in 1981. He retired from PACT in 1983, after which he spent two years at Calgary Opera and a season with the Bochumer Symphoniker.

== Personal life ==
Quayle met his Durban-born wife Joan in the Entertainment Unit during the Second World War. Joan, a singer under the name Joan Ayling, died in Durban in 1993. They had two sons: Bruce Anthony and Leo. He died of pneumonia in Durban on 19 May 2005.
