= Tracy Li =

South African ballet dancer

- Born: 1972; Hong Kong
- Occupation: Ballet dancer

Tracy Li (born 1972, in Hong Kong) is a South African ballet dancer of Chinese origin. She trained at The Christine Liao School of Ballet before receiving a scholarship from The Royal Hong Kong Jockey Club to study at the Australian Ballet School. At age 16, she joined the Hong Kong Ballet, before she left in 1992 for Durban, South Africa. She joined Napac Dance Company; however, she left the following year to join the Cape Town City Ballet, where she held the rank of senior principal. She was known for her partnership with Daniel Rajna and together they regularly toured as guest artists in Zimbabwe and Hong Kong. They were also both invited to the 2004 Miami Dance Festival. She retired in August 2007 after performances of Camille. She has also danced in the National Ballet Competition in China in 1986.

== Awards ==
- The Best Professional Ballet Dancer award in The Sanlam International Ballet Competition, 1993
- Balletomane Award for best female dancer, 1994, 1997, 1999, 2001 and 2003
- Nederberg Award, 1997
- Daphne Levy Award for her partnership with Daniel Rajna, 2001

== Notable roles ==
- Giselle in Giselle
- Coppélia in Coppélia
- Carmen in Carmen
- Princess Aurora in Sleeping Beauty
- Juliet in Romeo and Juliet
- Sugar Plum Fairy in The Nutcracker
- Camille in Camille
- Odette/Odile in Swan Lake
- Cinderella in Cinderella
