= Daniel Rajna =

South African ballet dancer

- Born: 1968; London, England
- Occupation: Ballet dancer
- Spouse: Leanne Voysey
- Children: Finn (2007-)
- Parent(s): Thomas Rajna and Ann Campion

Daniel Rajna born 1968, is a South African ballet dancer. After gaining a BSc in applied mathematics at UCT, he trained at the UCT Ballet school, Cape Town. He joined the former CAPAB Ballet in 1990, before leaving in 1997 to join PACT Ballet in Pretoria. He returned to Cape Town in 1999 and was a principal dancer at the Cape Town City Ballet. He is known for his interpretation of dramatic ballets and his partnership with friend, Tracy Li. He and his wife Leanne Voysey, a former principal dancer with Cape Town City Ballet, have a son Finn (born July 2007). He is the son of composer Thomas Rajna. He has performed as a guest artist in Hong Kong, Zimbabwe, The United States, South Africa and Taiwan. They were also both invited to the 2004 International Ballet Festival of Miami. He retired in August 2007 after several performances of Camille. After retirement Rajna made a radical career change and after studying for three years, joined a civil consultancy as a dam designer. He continued his association with ballet and was asked back on occasion to coach members of the ballet company. In 2015 Rajna and Li were invited to come out of retirement to give two performances of Veronica Paeper's ballet, "Carmen" accompanied by the Cape Town Philharmonic Orchestra.

== Awards ==
- FNB Vita Award 1999
- Balletomanes Award for best male dancer, 1996, 2000, 2002 and 2006
- Daphne Levy Award for his partnership with Tracy Li, 2001

== Notable roles ==
- Pluto in Orpheus in the Underworld
- Albrecht in Giselle
- Basilio in Don Quixote
- Crassus in Spartacus
- Armand in Camille
- Don Jose in Carmen
- Puck in A Midsummer Night's Dream
- James in La Sylphide
- Romeo in Romeo and Juliet
- Nutcracker Prince in The Nutcracker
- Florimund in The Sleeping Beauty
- Prince Siegfried in Swan Lake
