= Keith Mackintosh =

South African ballet dancer

Keith Mackintosh (born 4 October 1945) is a former principal ballet dancer and ballet master with Cape Town City Ballet.

== Early years ==
Mackintosh was born in Cardiff, Wales and began full-time ballet training at the age of 18 after gaining a scholarship from the Buckinghamshire Education Committee. He trained at the Arts Educational School in London for three years, during which he took roles in pantomimes, toured Hungary with West Side Story in 1965 and took part in the BBC's John Cranko production of Onegin in 1966. He trained under Eve Pettinger, Errol Addison, Ben Stevenson and Beryl Grey in London. Prompted by the arrival of Rudolf Nureyev on the London scene, he travelled to New York to train with David Howard, Stanley Williams, Maggie Black and Valentina Pereyaslavec. Mackintosh commented in 2017 that "Rudolf's charisma and technical brilliance not only changed negative perceptions about male dancers, he spurred me to higher achievements."

== Career ==
He first visited South Africa in 1967, on David Poole's invitation, to debut as Prince Siegfried in Swan Lake. He then joined the Iranian National Ballet for a year in 1968, before dancing in the inaugural performance of the Northern Dance Theatre. He was then invited to join the ballet of the Grande Theatre de Geneve by Alfonso Cata. He joined CAPAB Ballet as a principal dancer on 1 August 1971. He received South Africa's highest dance award, the Nederburg Award, in 1981. He was appointed Ballet Master in 1986, but continued dancing until retiring in 1990. After his retirement he focused on audience development and education, founding the Male Development Training Programme for boys from disadvantaged communities. Mackintosh also established the Keith Mackintosh Scholarship Fund which was integral in fundraising for the CTCB Endowment Trust. Mackintosh has guest taught in Finland, Sweden, The Netherlands, Germany, the UK and Monte Carlo. He served on Cape Town City Ballet's board as the Artistic Coordinator and Director of Outreach until his retirement in 2017.
