= Yvonne Mounsey =

Yvonne Mounsey (2 September 1919 – 29 September 2012) was a South African-American ballet dancer and teacher. Described as "a dancer of glamour, wit, and striking presence," she spent ten years with the New York City Ballet (1949–1959), where she created important roles in the works of George Balanchine and Jerome Robbins.

She was then instrumental in the formation of the Johannesburg City Ballet and was influential as an instructor at her own school in Santa Monica, California.

== Early life and training ==
Yvonne Louise Leibbrandt was born on a dairy farm on the outskirts of Pretoria, Transvaal (now Gauteng). She was the middle of three children born to her parents, who bore an ancient German surname and who spoke both Afrikaans and English, as did many residents of Pretoria at the time. Yvonne was raised to be fluent in both languages. When she entered primary school at age 6 or 7, she began taking ballet classes. She begged her parents to send her to England for further training. By 1937, when she was 16, they had saved enough money to grant her wishes.

After a long ocean voyage, Leibbrandt arrived in England and went directly to London. There, she attended technique classes in the studio of Igor Schwezoff before going to Paris to study with famed Russian teachers Olga Preobrajenska and Lubov Egorova.

Back in London, she found her first dancing job with the Carl Rosa Opera Company, which presented operas in English in London and the British provinces. Having grown too tall for the current standard of British ballerinas — at 5'6 1/2" she stood more than six feet on pointe — she auditioned successfully for the Ballet Russe de Monte Carlo, formed in 1937 by Léonide Massine and René Blum after a falling-out with Colonel Wassily de Basil over rights to works created for Diaghilev's Ballets Russes.

== Performing career ==
Leibbrandt joined the company in Monaco in the summber of 1939 and took part in performances in Monte Carlo, Nice, and Cannes. World War II broke out when Hitler's troops invaded Poland on 1 September 1939, and operations were suspended. She then headed for Australia, via South Africa, to join the Original Ballet Russe, a separate "Russian" troupe formed by de Basil to compete with the company of Massine and Blum. With that company, Leibbrandt began the second stage of her baller career under the stage name of Irina Zarova. George Balanchine cast her in the second movement of Balustrade (1941), his first setting of Stravinsky's Violin Concerto in D.

Once, after the dancers went on strike, Zarova found herself stranded in Cuba. She created a dance act that proved highly successful with patrons of Havana nightclubs. In 1945, she took her act to Mexico, where she again encountered Balanchine, who was staging a ballet at the Opera Nacional in Mexico City. He invited her to join his group of American dancers there, and she was happy to accept. In 1948, she returned to South Africa, formed her own company, won critical acclaim, and married an American, Duncan Mounsey. Thereafter, she would dance under her married name.

In 1949, she returned to the United States and once again accepted Balanchine's invitation to join his company, the New York City Ballet, which had just been created as a component of the City Center group of theatrical companies. She would spend the next decade of her dancing career with this troupe. Named a soloist after only a year with the company, she created a number of roles in new ballets by Balanchine, Robbins, and others.

- 1950. Jones Beach, choreography by Balanchine and Robbins, music by Jurriaan Andriessen. Role: Sunday (Allegro), with Melissa Hayden, Beatrice Tompkins, Herbert Bliss, Frank Hobi, and corps de ballet.
- 1951. The Cage, choreography by Robbins, music by Igor Stravinsky. Role: The Queen, with Nora Kaye as the Novice, Michael Maule as First Intruder, and Nicholas Magallanes as Second Intruder.
- 1951. La Valse, choreography by Balanchine, music by Maurice Ravel. Role: Fourth Waltz, with Michael Maule.
- 1951. Swan Lake (act 2), choreography by Balanchine after Lev Ivanov, music by Pyotr Ilyich Tchaikovsky. Role: lead dancer, Pas de Neuf.
- 1952. Picnic at Tintagel, choreography by Frederick Ashton, music by Arnold Bax. Role: Brangaene, Iseult's maid, with Francisco Moncion as King Mark, Diana Adams as Iseult, and Jacques d'Amboise as Tristram.
- 1953. Fanfare, choreography by Robbins, music by Benjamin Britten. Role: The Harp.
- 1954. The Nutcracker, choreography by Balanchine and Robbins, music by Pyotr Ilyich Tchaikovsky. Role: Hot Chocolate (Spanish Dance), with Herbert Bliss.
- 1956. The Concert, choreography by Robbins, music by Frédéric Chopin. Role: The Wife.

Besides these, Mounsey danced leading roles in existing works in the repertory. She was much admired as the Dark Angel in Balanchine's Serenade (music, Tchaikovsky), as Choleric in The Four Temperaments (Hindemith), and as An Episode in His Past in Antony Tudor's Lilac Garden (Chausson).

Her height and statuesque figure also lent much to the effectiveness of the role for which she became best known: The Siren in Balanchine's 1950 revival of his 1929 ballet The Prodigal Son (Prokofiev). She had studied the role with its originator, Felia Doubrovska, but her own interpretation and cool eroticism made an indelible impression on viewers in the 1950s. John Martin, dance critic of the New York Times, wrote: "She finds it quite her best role in the repertoire. She dances it with a studied voluptuousness that makes it mockingly cold."

Mounsey can be seen dancing on New York City Ballet in Montreal, volume 1, a digital video disc (DVD) issued by Video Arts International (VAI) in 2014. She appears in Serenade, filmed in 1957 with Diana Adams, Patricia Wilde, Jacques d'Amboise, and Herbert Bliss, and in Orpheus, filmed in 1960 with Nicholas Magallanes, Violette Verdy, Francisco Moncion, Roy Tobias, and Judith Green. Both ballets are complete versions, with the company's corps de ballet.

== Later life ==
After ten years with New York City Ballet, Mounsey returned to South Africa in 1959 and, with Faith de Villiers, founded the Johannesburg City Ballet, predecessor to PACT Ballet, named for the Performing Arts Council of the Transvaal. She returned to the United States in 1966 and settled briefly in Los Angeles. The next year, she and Rosemary Valaire, a close friend, founded the Westside School of Ballet in Santa Monica, California, where she taught in strict accordance with the principles of Balanchine's neoclassical technique.

The school became an influential center of training in Southern California for American dancers, many of whom went on to dance with New York City Ballet. In 2002, Mounsey received the Lester Horton Dance Award for lifetime achievement. In 2011 she was one of the recipients of the Jerome Robbins Award, given to thirty ballerinas who had given unforgettable performances in his ballets.

== Personal life ==
Mounsey was married three times. Her unions with Duncan Mounsey and with Albert Hall Hughey both ended in divorce. In 1960, she married Kelvin Clegg (9 September 1920 – 30 June 1993), with whom she had a daughter, Allegra, and two stepsons, Christopher and Stephen. Their marriage lasted until his death in 1993. She lived as a widow for almost another twenty years, until her own death from cancer at age 93.
