= Eduard Greyling =

South African ballet dancer, now retired (born 1948)

- Born: Eduard Christian Greyling; 15 February 1948 (age 78); Germiston, South Africa
- Occupation: Ballet dancer
- Parent(s): Ferdinand Jacobus Greyling and Jacomina Nicolasina Heyneman

Eduard Greyling (born 15 February 1948) is a South African ballet dancer, now retired. After an illustrious career as a principal dancer with CAPAB Ballet in Cape Town, he became well known as a dance notator, teacher, journalist, and critic.

== Early life and training ==
Eduard Christian Greyling was born in Germiston, a town in the northern province of Transvaal (now Gauteng) in South Africa. Located in the eastern part of the Witwatersrand, it was the site of a farm where a large deposit of gold was discovered in 1886, which led to the establishment of the gold-mining industry in South Africa and the development of the city of Johannesburg. Greyling was the son of Ferdinand Jacobus Greyling and his wife, Jacomina Nicolasina Heyneman. After the family had moved south, to Cape Town, he began his dance studies at the age of 12 with Jennifer Louw, subsequently enrolling at the University of Cape Town Ballet School for advanced training. There he was taught by Cecily Robinson, Pamela Chrimes, and David Poole, all of whom were exponents of the Cecchetti method of ballet training. He continued his studies with them after graduating in 1965 from D.F. Malan High School, a school (Afrikaans) in Bellville with a strong program in music and other arts.

== Performing career ==
In 1966, Greyling joined CAPAB Ballet, a government-subsidized company named for the Cape Performing Arts Board. With his good looks, muscular physique, imposing height, and clean technique, he was soon cast in leading roles, becoming the first danseur noble to emerge from the ranks of the company. Over the next few years, he appeared as Siegfried in Swan Lake (1967), Solor in La Bayadère (1969), Franz in Coppélia (1971), Amyntas in Sylvia (1971), Albrecht in Giselle (1972), the Prince in The Nutcracker (1972), and the Poet in Les Sylphides (1974). He also excelled in lighthearted roles, such as the Artist in Frederick Ashton's The Two Pigeons (1968) and Captain Belaye in John Cranko's Pineapple Poll (1969), and in heroic roles, such as Daphnis in Gary Burne's Daphnis and Chloë (1969) and Oberon in David Poole's A Midsummer Night's Dream (1970). He was the acknowledged leader of the company's contingent of accomplished male dancers, which included Keith Macintosh, Keith Maidwell, and John Simons.

In 1972, Greyling left Cape Town and traveled to Europe, where he took ballet classes with Eileen Ward in London and Ivan Kramer in Amsterdam. He joined the Dutch National Ballet (Het Nationale Ballet) as a soloist in 1974 and was soon cast in George Balanchine's Concerto Barocco, Harald Lander's Études, and Rudi van Dantzig's Monument for a Dead Boy. Hans van Manen created roles for him in his ballets Kwintet and Le Sacre du Printemps (both 1974). While with the Dutch company, he toured with them throughout the Netherlands and in Germany, Brazil, Canada, and England.

Greyling returned to South Africa in August 1975 and rejoined CAPAB Ballet as its principal male dancer. His partnership with ballerina Phyllis Spira became legendary, as they danced together for some seventeen years. In 1980, Greyling danced as guest artist, opposite Maina Gielgud, in her Steps, Notes, and Squeaks at the Old Vic Theatre in London. He also performed as a guest artist with the Bulawayo Ballet Society in Rhodesia (now Zimbabwe), the Los Angeles Classical Ballet, and the South African ballet companies in Transvaal and Natal (now KwaZulu-Natal). He officially retired from the Cape Town company in 1988.

== Later life ==
Greyling then went to London to study choreology, the art of notating dance movement, at the Benesh Institute. Upon completion of his first course of study in 1991, he returned to Cape Town and rejoined the CAPAB company as choreologist, teacher, and occasional guest artist in principal and character roles. In 1996, he went back to London for further study of the Benesh system of dance notation. He became a lecturer on notation at the University of Cape Town School of Ballet later that year and began graduate studies in music and dance at the university. He earned a master of music degree in 2000 and a doctorate in 2004, with a dissertation exploring the notation of African dance. During these years, he became a dance critic for Die Burger (The Citizen), an Afrikaans newspaper published daily in Cape Town, and worked as a guest teacher at ballet schools and companies in Japan, Hong Kong, and the United States. He retired from the stage for good in 2008, when he was sixty, but he continues to work as a journalist and a freelance teacher.

Patron of the Cecchetti Society of Southern Africa, Greyling continued to teach the Cecchetti method of ballet training that he had studied all his life. He has written that to train in this method "is to carry a torch that has been burning for over a century. A tradition of lyrical beauty, classical line, musicality, finesse, attention to detail, warmth of spirit, and the flame of dance." He always sought to impart a sense of joy in movement to his students and to teach them artistic responsibility. "And what is a professional dancer's task but to carry the audience into a world of fantasy and magic."

== Honors and awards ==
In 1977 and 1983, Greyling was the recipient of the Nederburg Award, bestowed by the Stellenbosch Farmer's Winery for outstanding services to ballet. He won the Naomi Press Scenaria Award in 1988. In 2006, he was named a fellow of the Benesh Institute, the highest honor bestowed by the Royal Academy of Dance in recognition of outstanding and exceptional service rendered over a substantial period of time to the Benesh Institute and Benesh Movement Notation. That same year, he was appointed an honorary member of Cecchetti International. In 2009, the Cape Tercentenary Foundation awarded him the Molteno Medal for lifetime achievement.
