= Alexander Bennett (dancer) =

British ballet dancer

Alexander Bennett (27 July 1929 – 15 February 2003) was a British ballet dancer, choreographer, ballet master, and teacher.

== Early life and training ==
Alexander Bennett was born in Leith, the coastal district on the Firth of Forth that serves as the port of the city of Edinburgh. He was the younger of two sons of a working-class family, and was raised by parents who valued education and who encouraged him to pursue his varied interests. As a boy, he was introduced to dance by watching the films of Fred Astaire and Gene Kelly at the Alhambra Theater in Leith. Motivated to emulate them, he studied tap dance and became proficient enough to perform in concerts produced by various youth groups. A lover of classical music, he also learned to play the piano, often playing for the Boys' Brigade and for Bible class. He was educated at Trinity Academy, a comprehensive secondary school under the control of the Edinburgh City Council, where he took Highers, specializing in the languages French, German, and Latin. An accomplished athlete as well as a linguist, he also played sports on his school teams.

In August 1946, Bennett saw the Sadler's Wells Ballet performing in Edinburgh and was inspired, at the age of seventeen, to enroll in ballet classes with Marjorie Middleton, one of his home city's leading dance teachers. To accept the bursary offered by Middleton, he successfully applied for a nine-month deferment of his military conscription. Despite his late start in dance classes, he showed promise of developing talent, and Middleton included him in the cast of her ballet The Four Horsemen of the Apocalypse, performed at the Edinburgh Ballet Club in 1948. Soon thereafter, Bennett joined the British Army and was ordered to London to study Russian and to be trained as a member of the Secret Intelligence Service (MI6). In that capacity, he was posted to Germany for the remainder of his two-year tour of duty.

Upon completion of his national service in 1950, Bennett returned to London to join the British Foreign Office, responsible for monitoring the foreign affairs of the United Kingdom. In his spare time, he resumed his dance training at the Sadler's Wells Ballet School with Vera Volkova, who, nearing the end of her tenure there, recommended that he take classes with Marie Rambert at her school in Notting Hill Gate. Although Rambert claimed to have been initially unimpressed with the abilities of the pale, sandy-haired Scotsman, when she found herself in need of a tall male dancer a few weeks later, she sent for him and asked him to join her company. Faced with a choice between his secure job in the Foreign Office and the uncertain possibility of becoming a professional ballet dancer, Bennett took a risk and accepted Rambert's offer.

== Performing career ==
As a junior member of Ballet Rambert, Bennett made his debut on the professional ballet stage in April 1951 as the peasant Hilarion, the rejected suitor in Giselle, a role that required more acting than dancing. Rambert then took him under her wing and, within eighteen months, transformed him into a brilliant Albrecht, the danseur noble of the ballet. For the next five years, until 1957, Bennett danced with Rambert's company, appearing in both classic and modern works and creating a variety of roles for such inventive choreographers as John Cranko and Robert Joffrey. His principal partner during most of this time was Beryl Goldwyn.He also appeared occasionally with the Sadler's Wells Theatre Ballet, where in 1957 he was appointed a principal dancer. During his nine years with the Sadler's Wells company (later renamed the Royal Ballet Touring Company), he gained a large regional fan base. He was known for such classic roles as Siegfried in Swan Lake, Franz in Coppélia, and Florimund (Prince Dėsirė) in The Sleeping Beauty as well as for such expressive roles as the Poet in Frederick Ashton's Apparitions and the Husband in Kenneth MacMillan's The Invitation. In 1964, he returned to Ballet Rambert for one final year, during which he danced the technically difficult role of James in August Bournonville's La Sylphide.

In 1965, nearing the end of his performing career, Bennett accepted the invitation of Faith de Villiers to become ballet master for the dance company of the Performing Arts Council of the Transvaal (Transvaalse Radd vir die Uitvoerende Kunste), in Johannesburg, South Africa. For this company, known as PACT/TRUK Ballet, he staged an evening-length production of Coppélia, in three acts, and a one-act version of Aurora's Wedding (Aurora se Huwelik), incorporating dances from the prologue and the final act of The Sleeping Beauty. He also produced Frederick Ashton's Façade and Les Patineurs for the company, both of which became popular showpieces throughout South Africa. Besides his work as ballet master, he made his last appearances on stage in 1965 as Florimund in Aurora's Wedding, as the Rejected Lover in Audrey King's La Fenêtre, and as Prince Marzipan in Walter Gore's production of Casse Noisette (The Nutcracker).

== Later life ==
Upon returning to England in 1966, Bennett worked as ballet master for Western Theatre Ballet (later named the Scottish Ballet) in Bristol until 1969, when he went back to London to be ballet master of Covent Garden Opera Ballet. In 1970, he served as teacher and ballet master for the Icelandic Dance Company (Islenski Dansflokkurinn) in Reykjavik. He then moved to the United States, working as artistic director of several regional companies, including the Twin Cities Ballet in Bloomington, Illinois, and the Chattanooga Center for the Dance/Chattanooga Ballet and the Scottish-American Ballet in Chattanooga, Tennessee. He took the latter company to the Edinburgh Festival Fringe on several occasions between 1985 and 1995. In the late 1980s, he also worked as artistic director of the Ballet Nacional do Brazil in São Psulo. Throughout these later years, he taught technique classes and staged ballets from the classic repertory for many companies around the world. Some of his productions were criticized as being old-fashioned, but he was highly valued as an inspirational guest teacher, able to impart traditional values to young dance students.

Bennett returned to Scotland in 2001 and settled in a small house just outside Edinburgh. He died in his sleep in 2003, at age seventy-three, in Taynuilt in Argyll, while working on a production of Swan Lake for Ballet West. Among his effects were draft manuscripts for two books: one a biography of Marie Rambert, with whom he felt a special affinity, and the other a monograph on Bournonville's La Sylphide. He had for many years been interested in the background of this romantic tale of a Scottish farmer, James Ruben, who abandons his rural sweetheart to pursue an illusion of beauty in the form of a woodland spirit. Cursed by a witch for his infidelity, James unwittingly causes the death of the sylphide and is left alone, heartbroken, in the shadowy forest. In the distance, a wedding procession reminds him of reality and the happy life he might have had.
