= Johnny Bovang =

South African ballet dancer

- Born: Kristiansand, Norway
- Occupation: Ballet dancer
- Spouse: Robin Van Wyk

Johnny Bovang born Kristiansand, Norway, is a South African ballet dancer. He trained at the Royal Ballet School, London and joined the PACT Ballet Company, which was based in Pretoria, in 1983. He moved to the Cape Town City Ballet in 1997. He danced at the inauguration of former South African president Nelson Mandela. He has performed as a guest artist in Tokyo, Glasgow and New Zealand. He is known for his partnerships of Janet Lindup, Leanne Voysey and Marianne Bauer. During his career, he has received many awards, including the DALRO, FNB Vita and the Nederburg awards. He received the Balletomane Award for best male dancer in 2004.

== Notable roles ==
- Albrecht in Giselle
- Prince Siegfried in Swan Lake
- Florimund and The Bluebird in The Sleeping Beauty
- Romeo in Romeo and Juliet
- Nutcracker Prince in The Nutcracker
- Puck in A Midsummer Night's Dream
- Basilio in Don Quixote
- Crassus in Spartacus
- Armand in Camille
- Danillo and Camille in The Merry Widow
- Solor in La Bayadère
- Hamlet in Hamlet
- Orpheus in Orpheus in the Underworld
