= Daria Klimentová =

Czech ballet dancer, teacher and photographer

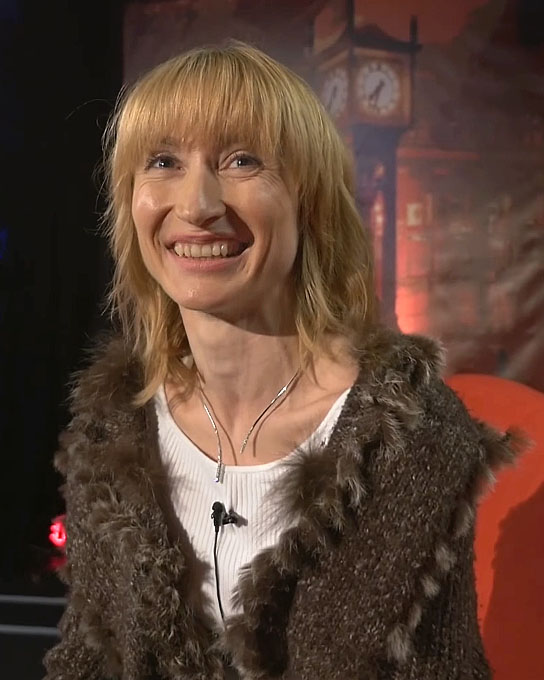
- Daria Klimentová in a 2016 TV show
- Born: 23 June 1971 (age 53); Prague, Czechoslovakia
- Education: Prague State Conservatoire of Music and Dance
- Occupations: ballet dancer; ballet teacher; photographer
- Children: 1
- Career
- Former groups: National Theatre Ballet; Cape Town City Ballet; Scottish Ballet; English National Ballet
- Dances: Ballet

Daria Klimentová (born 23 June 1971) is a Czech retired ballet dancer, ballet teacher and photographer . She spent most of her career as a lead principal dancer at English National Ballet. She is currently a teacher at the Royal Ballet Upper School.

== Early life and training ==
Klimentová is from Prague, and grew up under the Soviet regime. She was first trained as a gymnast, then switched to ballet as she would have a longer career. Klimentová had her ballet training at the Prague State Conservatoire of Music and Dance for eight years, and graduated with the highest honour. As a student she won Prix de Lausanne competition (1989, Paris Dance Foundation award) and the Gold medal of the International Ballet Competition in Pretoria.

== Career ==
=== Dance ===
In 1989, following her graduation, Klimentová joined National Theatre Ballet in Prague as a soloist, and was promoted to principal dancer a year later. In 1992, she joined Cape Town City Ballet in South Africa as principal. The following year, she joined the Scottish Ballet as a principal dancer.

In 1996, Klimentová joined the English National Ballet at the invitation of then-artistic director Derek Deane. She had danced many of the company's repertoire, including Princess Aurora in The Sleeping Beauty, Sugar Plum Fairy in The Nutcracker and the title role in Manon. She had created principal roles in Camille, The Snow Queen and Double Concerto. She also had a close creative relationship with the choreographer of the latter, Christopher Hampson.

In 2010, Klimentová rehearsed with Vadim Muntagirov, 19 years her junior, for his debut in Swan Lake, though he was supposed to dance with guest star Polina Semionova. However, Semionova had to withdraw from opening night as she did not have a visa, so Klimentová stepped in and performed. The performance received critical acclaim, and their partnership was compared to Margot Fonteyn and Rudolf Nureyev's partnership. The rehearsals and performance was featured in the BBC4 documentary Agony and Ecstasy: A Year with English National Ballet. Since then, the two were paired together frequently. Klimentová noted it is a partnership she waited 20 years for.

In 2014, Klimentová announced she would retire from dancing, due to age and "just been doing it for so long." Muntagirov, who announced he would join The Royal Ballet around the same time, was consulted. In June, at age 42, Klimentová performed her final performance, which was Romeo and Juliet. Muntagirov returned to ENB to dance with her.

=== Teaching ===
In 2003, Klimentová founded International Ballet Masterclasses in Prague, which invite international stars such as Tamara Rojo, Nicolas Le Riche and Julio Bocca to teach students in Prague.

In 2014, she finished training as a teacher at The Royal Ballet School. Later that year, following her retirement as a dancer, she joined the teaching staff of the Royal Ballet Upper School.

=== Other ventures ===
In March 2013 Klimentová published her autobiography entitled Daria Klimentova – Agony and Ecstasy: My Life in Dance in which she detailed both her upbringing in Soviet-era Czechoslovakia and her ballet career.

Klimentová is also a photographer.

== Personal life ==
Klimentová has a daughter.
