= Vadim Muntagirov =

Russian ballet dancer (born 1990)

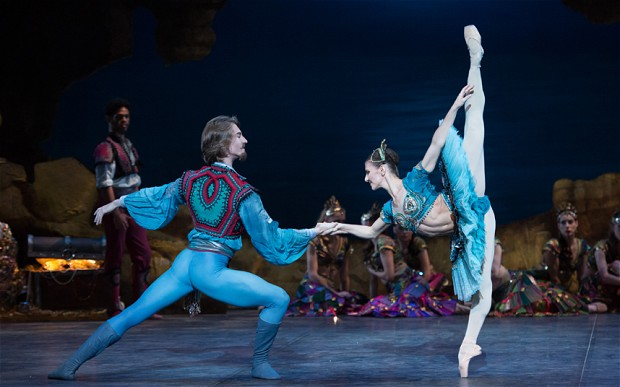
- Alina Cojocaru and Vadim Muntagirov in the roles of Medora and Conrad of Le Corsaire produced by the English National Ballet
- Born: Vadim Muntagirov; 16 April 1990 (age 36); Chelyabinsk, Russian SFSR, Soviet Union
- Education: Perm State Choreographic College; The Royal Ballet School
- Occupation: ballet dancer
- Years active: 2009–present
- Spouse: Fumi Kaneko (m. 2026)
- Dancing career
- Current group: The Royal Ballet
- Former groups: English National Ballet

Vadim Muntagirov (Russian: Вадим Мунтагиров; born 16 April 1990) is a Russian ballet dancer. He is a principal dancer at The Royal Ballet in London and previously a lead principal dancer at the English National Ballet.

== Early life ==
Muntagirov was born in Chelyabinsk, Russia. His parents and elder sister are ballet dancers. At age nine, he entered Perm State Choreographic College, where his parents and sister trained, and trained there for six years. In 2006, after he won a scholarship at the Prix de Lausanne, despite not speaking English, he chose to relocate to London and trained at The Royal Ballet School. He planned to stay for a year, but Gailene Stock, then-director of the school, convinced him to continue his training there. He graduated in 2009.

== Career ==
In 2009, after Muntagirov graduated, he joined the English National Ballet as First Artist. During his first season, he danced Albrecht in Giselle and the Prince in Cinderella.

In 2010, Muntagirov was promoted to First Soloist. He was chosen to perform Prince Siegfried Swan Lake with guest star Polina Semionova, but he rehearsed the role with Daria Klimentová, 19 years his senior. However, Semionova had to withdraw from opening night as she did not have a visa, so Klimentová stepped in and performed. The performance received critical acclaim, and their partnership was compared to Margot Fonteyn and Rudolf Nureyev's partnership. The rehearsals and performance was featured in the BBC4 documentary Agony and Ecstasy: A Year with English National Ballet. Since then, the two were paired together frequently. Klimentová noted it is a partnership she waited 20 years for.

Muntagirov was promoted to Principal in 2011 and Lead Principal in 2012. He performed lead roles such as Conrad in Le Corsaire, the poet in Les Sylphides and the title role in Apollo, and originated the role of the Prince in Wayne Eagling's The Nutcracker. In 2013, he won the Prix Benois de la Danse for the Prince in The Sleeping Beauty.

In January 2014, Muntagirov announced that he would join The Royal Ballet as a Principal Dancer. He made his debut in the company as the Prince in The Sleeping Beauty, with Akane Takada as Princess Aurora. Later that year, he returned to ENB to dance at Klimentová's final performance, which was Romeo and Juliet. At the Royal Ballet, he danced lead roles such as Solor in La Bayadère, Des Grieux in Manon, Colas in La Fille mal gardée and the Young Man in The Two Pigeons. In 2019, he won his second Prix Benois de la Danse, this time for Prince Siegfried in Swan Lake.

Muntagirov is a permanent guest artist in the National Ballet of Japan, and had made guest appearances with Paris Opera Ballet, Mariinsky Ballet in St. Petersburg and American Ballet Theatre in Washington D.C.. Muntagirov had also taught in Klimentová's masterclass in Prague. In June 2020, in the first series of performance since the Royal Opera House's closure due to the 2019-20 coronavirus pandemic, which was broadcast online, Muntagirov performed Frederick Ashton's Dance of the Blessed Spirits, which he learned from Anthony Dowell in 2016.

== Personal life ==
Muntagirov lives in West London, and married fellow Royal Ballet principal Fumi Kaneko on 11 February 2026.

== Selected repertoire ==
=== English National Ballet ===
- Albrecht in Giselle
- The Prince in Cinderella
- Prince Siegfried in Swan Lake
- The poet in Les Sylphides
- Romeo in Rudolf Nureyev's Romeo and Juliet
- Apollo
- The Prince in The Sleeping Beauty

==== Created roles ====
- The Prince in Wayne Eagling's The Nutcracker

=== The Royal Ballet ===
- Basilio in Don Quixote
- Albrecht in Giselle
- Prince Siegfried in Swan Lake
- Aminta in Sylvia
- Prince Florimund in The Sleeping Beauty
- Prince in Peter Wright's The Nutcracker
- Colas in La Fille mal gardée
- The Young Man in The Two Pigeons
- Lensky in Onegin
- Romeo in Kenneth MacMillan's Romeo and Juliet
- Des Grieux in Manon
- Jack/Knave of Hearts in Alice's Adventures in Wonderland
- Florizel in The Winter's Tale
- Franz in Coppélia
- Don José in Carmen
- Lt Colonel Vershinin in Winter Dreams
- "Diamonds" in Jewels
- Symphonic Variations
- Tchaikovsky Pas de deux
- Within the Golden Hour

== Awards ==
- Laureate at Prix de Lausanne
- Second place and silver medal at Arabesque competition
- First place and gold medal at Vaganova Prix competition
- First place at Youth America Grand Prix
- 2010 Critics’ Circle National Dance Award for Outstanding Male Performance (Classical)
- 2015 and 2018 Best Male Dancer at the Critics’ Circle National Dance Awards
- 2013 and 2019 Prix Benois de la Danse
- 2021 Dancer of the Year, Dance Europe
