= Faith de Villiers =

- Born: 21 October 1920; Johannesburg, Transvaal, South Africa
- Died: October 2001 (aged 80–81); KwaZulu-Natal, South Africa
- Education: Ballet training in London under Margaret Craske and Igor Schwezoff
- Occupations: Ballet dancer, choreographer, producer, teacher, company director, adjudicator
- Years active: 1930s–1990s
- Organizations: Cecchetti Society of Southern Africa (Chair for 25 years)
- Known for: Pioneer of ballet in South Africa; artistic leadership of PACT Ballet
- Notable work: Productions of Casse Noisette (The Nutcracker), Coppélia, Aurora’s Wedding, Les Patineurs
- Movement: Cecchetti method (ballet training)
- Spouse: Thomas Renwick (m. 1948)
- Children: 1
- Awards: Enrico Cecchetti Medal (1971); Imperial Medal, Imperial Society of Teachers of Dancing; Southern African Cecchetti Dedication Award (1996)

Faith de Villiers (21 October 1920 – October 2001) was a South African dancer, producer, choreographer, teacher, company director, and adjudicator. Active primarily in the northern province of the Transvaal (since divided into Gauteng, Mpumalanga, and Limpopo), she is recognized as one of the most influential pioneers of ballet in South Africa.

== Early life and training ==
Faith de Villiers was born in Johannesburg, the largest city in the Transvaal and the center of gold mining and industry in South Africa. She began her dance training at an early age, with Delphine Thompson, a pupil of one of the founders of the Cecchetti Society in South Africa. At age 12, she entered the Johannesburg Cambrian Society National Eisteddfod and was judged best all-around dancer in the 11- to 13-year-old category. The gold medal, presented to her by Dulcie Howes, the adjudicator and a national celebrity, was accompanied by a bursary that started her off on her career in dance.

At age 18, de Villiers got a temporary dancing job with the Carl Rosa Opera Company when it toured South Africa for three months in 1938. Her earnings allowed her to travel to London, where she studied under Margaret Craske, a teacher of the Cecchetti method of ballet training, and Igor Schwezoff, a Russian who had trained at the Leningrad Choreographic School. At the time, war clouds were gathering over continental Europe, and it did not seem prudent for her to remain much longer in England.

== Professional career ==
De Villiers returned to Johannesburg in 1939 and became ballet mistress, choreographer, and ensemble director for African Consolidated Theatres. After some years, she formed her own performing group, Ballet Theatre, with Joyce van Geems, in 1947. It was the first of several such troupes that she would initiate. The next year, she married and moved to Cape Town, where she began teaching at the school of the South African National Ballet, producing ballets, and touring the group to nearby Stellenbosch and Paarl. She returned frequently to Johannesburg, despite the great distance, to continue her work with African Consolidated Theatres. With her husband and child, she moved back to her home city in 1952 and continued producing ballets for performances in cities and towns throughout the Transvaal and in neighboring Mozambique. When Yvonne Mounsey returned to South Africa from New York in 1959, de Villiers joined her in founding the Johannesburg City Ballet, of which she became artistic director in 1961. The company was renamed Ballet Transvaal and then, in 1963, PACT Ballet, so called for the Performing Arts Council of the Transvaal and known in Afrikaans as TRUK Ballet, for the Transvaalse Raad vir die Uitvoerende Kunste.

With a government subsidy, PACT Ballet became a fully professional, bilingual company, guided by de Villiers as artistic manager from 1964 until 1969. During her five-year tenure in this position, she was responsible for bringing the great French ballerina Yvette Chauviré to dance Giselle in theaters in Johannesburg and nearby Pretoria. She hired Alexander Bennett, a former Royal Ballet principal, to be ballet master and to produce Coppélia, Aurora's Wedding (Aurora se Huwelik), and Frederick Ashton's Les Patineurs. In 1965, Yvonne Mounsey staged a version of the pas de deux from Jerome Robbins's Interplay (Heen-en-weer-spel); Peter Clegg recreated Ashton's Façade; and de Villiers herself mounted Walter Gore's production of Casse Noisette (The Nutcracker, Die Neutkraker) for the Christmas season at the splendid, new Civic Theatre. She brought Roland Petit and Zizi Jeanmaire to Johannesburg to stage Carmen and Françoise Adret to choreograph a new Cinderella, with Galina Samsova in the title role. Both ballets, mounted with striking sets and sumptuous costumes, were popular successes. When Frank Staff arrived as resident choreographer, he mounted his charming Peter and the Wolf, originally created for Ballet Rambert in London, and created seven new works for the company, including Five Faces of Euridice (Vyf Fasette van Euridice, 1965), Czernyana III (1966), and Raka (1967).

Under de Villiers's aegis, PACT Ballet performed in many major cities of South Africa, including Pretoria, Bloemfontein, Kimberley, Durban, and Cape Town. It also traveled across the Limpopo River to Rhodesia (now Zimbabwe), where it was presented by the Rhodesian National Ballet in performances in Salisbury (now Harare), Bulawayo, and Gwelo (now Gweru). Concurrent with administering such activity, de Villiers began a major outreach to Transvaal schools and the general public. A grant from the provincial Department of Arts and Sciences allowed her to tour two groups of company members ("the Midgets" and "the Giants") to perform programs of divertissements and short ballets on stages in school auditoriums and town halls in dorpies on the Highveld and the Bushveld of the vast Transvaal. Among the works presented was Allegro di Concierto (1965), a work evocative of a storm at sea, set by de Villiers to the piano music of Enrique Granados. Besides acting as choreographer, administrator, and impresario, de Villiers was a cheerful "mother hen" of her company, mindful of the welfare of her dancers and their futures. She was mentor to several South African ballerinas, including Sandra Lipman and Noleen Nicol, who went on to international careers in European companies, and Dawn Weller, who had a decades-long career in PACT Ballet as dancer, artistic director, and prima ballerina.

== Related activities and awards ==
As chair of the Cecchetti Society of Southern Africa for twenty-five years, and as a senior major examiner on both the national and international circuits, de Villiers was devoted to supporting the Cecchetti method of teaching ballet. Recipient of the Enrico Cecchetti Medal in 1971, she was also honored with the Imperial Medal by the Imperial Society of Teachers of Dancing, London, in recognition of her service to its Cecchetti Branch. She received the Southern African Cecchetti dedication award in 1996 and continued to promote ballet during her close involvement with the Val Whyte Bursary. For many years, she acted as adjudicator, with Dulcie Howes, of the Choreographic Award sponsored by the South African government,

== Personal life ==
In 1948, de Villiers married Thomas Renwick, an executive with the Otis Elevator Company, with whom she had one child. After both he and she retired, they moved from Johannesburg to Umhlanga Rocks, a seaside community north of Durban (now eThukwini) in KwaZulu-Natal. An avid gardener, a quixotic bridge player, and a steadfast friend to many, she was a woman of optimism, good will, and apparently boundless energy. Her passionate enthusiasm for ballet was undiminished until the end of her life in 2001.
