= Thomas Edur =

Estonian ballet dancer (born 1969)

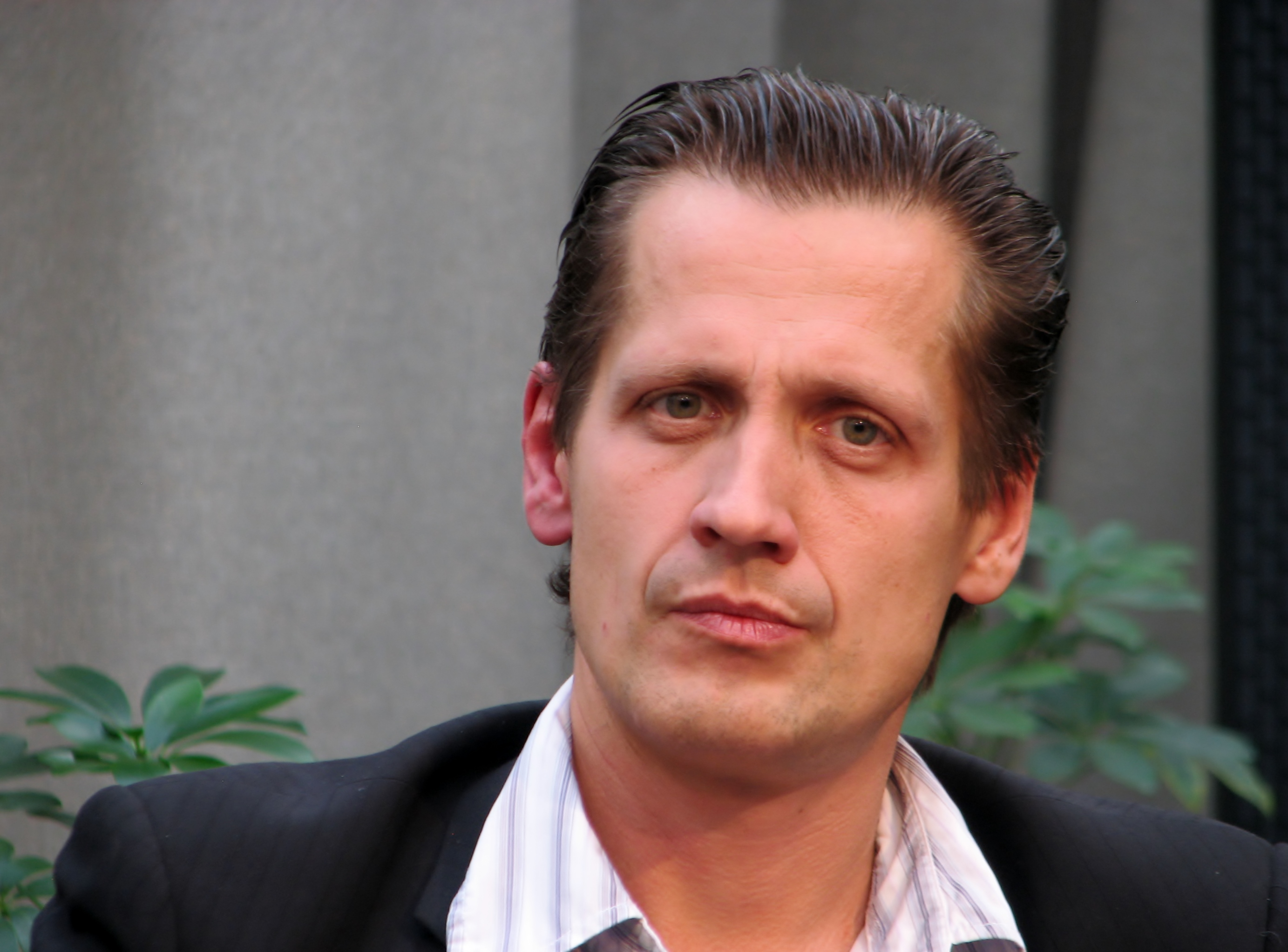
Thomas Edur

Toomas Edur CBE (known internationally as Thomas Edur; 20 January 1969) is an Estonian former ballet dancer, and 2009–2019, the artistic director of Estonian National Ballet.

== Biography ==
Edur was born in Tallinn. He is a graduate of Tallinn Ballet School in 1988. From 1990 to 2009, he was a principal dancer with the English National Ballet (ENB).

Edur was married to fellow former ENB dancer Age Oks. Oks is also Estonian, and is professionally known as Agnes Oaks.
