= Queen at the Ballet =

Queen at the Ballet is a rock ballet in two acts created by Sean Bovim as a tribute to Freddie Mercury, that brings the music of Queen vividly back to life – interpreting the stories behind classic songs such as "Bohemian Rhapsody", "Radio Ga Ga" and "Killer Queen".

In February 2012 Cito, the lead singer of the band "Wonderboom" performed live vocals at Oude Libertas Wine Farm Amphitheatre Vocals in Stellenbosch, Western Cape, SA.

== Venues ==
1. 20h00 February 1 to 11 February 2012 at Oude Libertas Wine Amphitheatre in Stellenbosch, Western Cape, SA.
2. July 6 to 15 July 2006: The Point Theatre, Dublin, Ireland.
3. 24 - 28 and 31 January and 1 February 2006: Spier Amphitheatre
4. 30 August - 11 September 2005: Montecasino
5. 30 April - 15 May 2005: Artscape Opera House, Cape Town, South Africa.
6. 30 September - 9 October 2004: Artscape Opera House, Cape Town, South Africa.

== Songs ==
=== Act One ===
1. "Death on Two Legs" (Mercury)
2. "Lazing on a Sunday Afternoon" (Mercury)
3. "Killer Queen" (Mercury)
4. "Under Pressure" (Queen, David Bowie)
5. "Good Old-Fashioned Lover Boy" (Mercury)
6. "Bicycle Race" (Mercury)
7. "Who Wants to Live Forever" (May)
8. "Another One Bites the Dust" (Deacon)
9. "Don’t Try So Hard" (Queen)
10. "Don't Stop Me Now" (Mercury)
11. "The Millionaire Waltz" (Mercury)

=== Act Two ===
1. "Innuendo" (Queen)
2. "We Will Rock You" (May)
3. "Play the Game" (Mercury)
4. "Seaside Rendezvous" (Mercury)
5. "Love of My Life" (Mercury)
6. "Radio Ga Ga" (Taylor)
7. "You Take My Breath Away" (Mercury)
8. "Bohemian Rhapsody" (Mercury)
9. "God Save the Queen" (Arr. May)
10. "Barcelona" (Mercury)

== See also ==
- List of ballets by title
