= Robin Hood (ballet) =

Robin Hood is a ballet created by choreographer and artistic director Paul Vasterling for the Nashville Ballet in 1998. The full-length ballet is in two acts and contains the music of Erich Wolfgang Korngold. Although Korngold wrote music to the 1938 movie The Adventures of Robin Hood, no music from the film is used in the ballet. Korngold’s early chamber music is used, as well as his Theme and Variations, Op. 42, and movements from both his Symphony in F-sharp major and Violin Concerto. The suite Much Ado About Nothing is used extensively in both acts and concludes the ballet.
