= Agnes Oaks =

Estonian ballet dancer (born 1970)

Agnes Oaks CBE
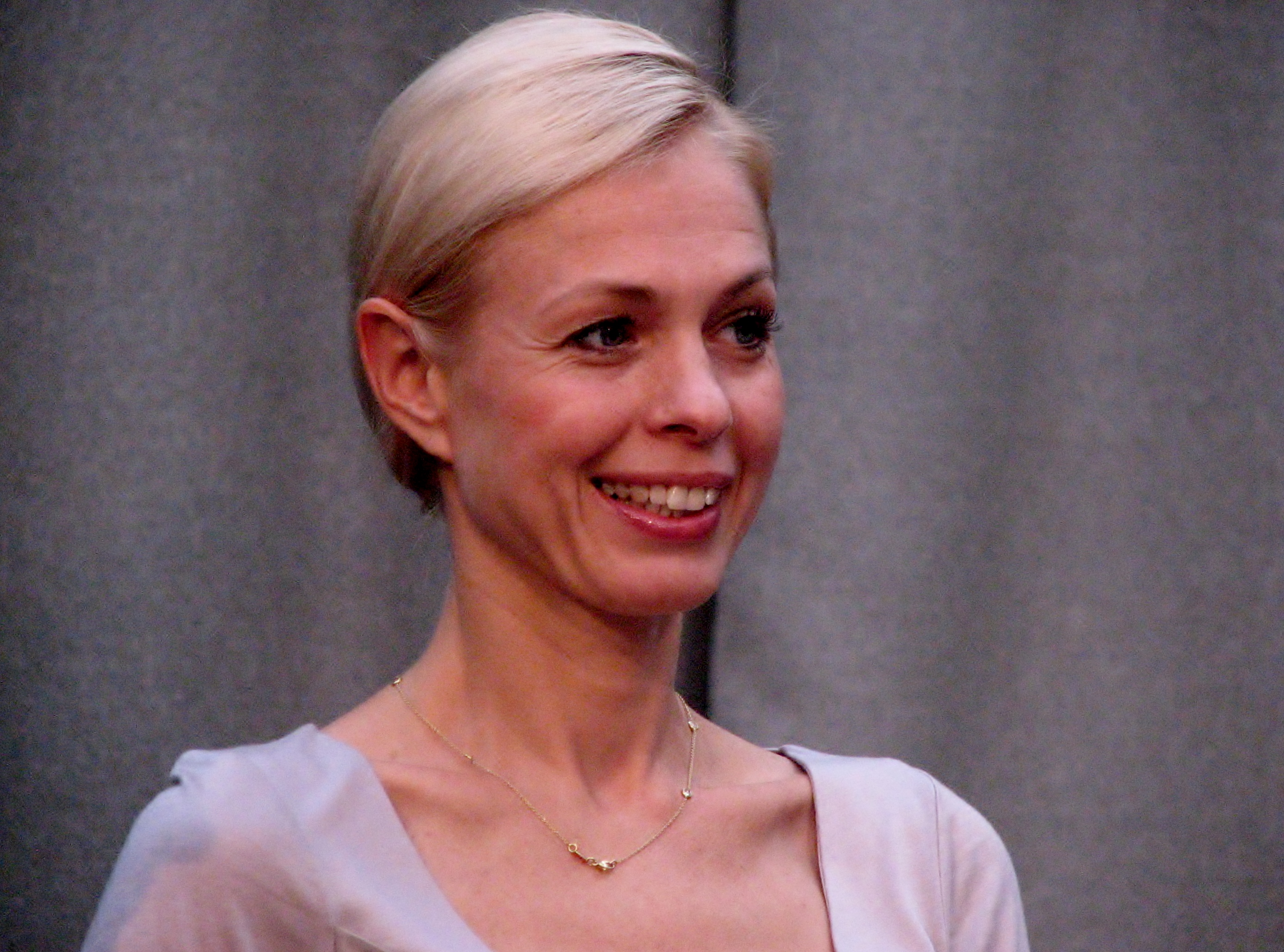
- Oaks in 2013
- Born: Age Oks; 29 May 1970 (age 55); Vändra, then part of Estonian SSR, Soviet Union
- Spouse: Thomas Edur (m. 1990; div. 2016)
- Children: 1
- Career
- Former groups: English National Ballet; Birmingham Royal Ballet; Estonian National Ballet

Age Oks CBE (born 29 May 1970) known professionally as Agnes Oaks, is an Estonian former ballet dancer, who was a principal dancer with English National Ballet.

== Early life ==
Age Oks was born in Vändra to an Estonian father, Juhan Oks, and a Russian mother, Valentina Oks (née Trofimova). She started ballet at age 10, and her mother sent her to audition for the Estonian State Ballet School, and started training there. She later entered the Bolshoi Ballet School.

== Career ==
Oks first danced with the Estonian National Ballet. In 1990, after winning the USA International Ballet Competition in Jackson, Mississippi with her on-and-off-stage partner Thomas Edur, Ivan Nagy, then-artistic director of English National Ballet invited the two to move to London to join the company as principal dancers, and she anglicised her stage name. The two then danced with the Birmingham Royal Ballet between 1996 and 1997, then went freelance but remained with the English National Ballet as principal guest artists.

For Wayne McGregor's 2 Human, Oaks was nominated for the Prix Benois de la Danse, and won the Laurence Olivier Award for Outstanding Achievement in Dance with Edur.

In 2009, Oaks retired from dancing. She said she delayed her retirement after she learned ENB would debut Kenneth MacMillan's Manon. She then relocated to Tallinn, as Edur was named artistic director of the Estonian National Ballet.

Oaks is a recipient Order of the White Star, 3rd Class. In 2010, she was awarded Commander of the Order of the British Empire.

== Personal life ==
Oaks was married to Thomas Edur, a fellow Estonian principal at ENB and later the artistic director of Estonian National Ballet. They have a daughter, born in 2010.
