= Petrus Bosman =

South African ballet dancer and teacher

- Born: 1928; Kuilsrivier, South Africa
- Died: July 19, 2008 (aged 80); Indianapolis, Indiana, United States
- Education: University of Cape Town
- Occupations: Dancer; teacher; choreographer
- Years active: 1951–2006
- Career
- Former groups: Festival Ballet; Royal Ballet; Maryland Ballet; Ballet West
- Dances: Ballet

Petrus Bosman (1928 – 19 July 2008) was a South African ballet dancer, teacher, choreographer, and répétiteur, active in England, France, and the United States.

== Early life and training ==
Jan Petrus Bosman was born in Kuilsrivier, a town in the Western Cape Province located on the Kuils River, in which there are many pools, or kuile. His parents were Afrikaners, but young Petrus was raised to be fluent in English as well as Afrikaans. His family was related to Herman Charles Bosman (1905–1951), widely admired as a journalist, poet, and author. Also of Afrikaner stock, he was celebrated as a short-story writer in English. Like his famous relative, Petrus Bosman easily entered the English-speaking cultural community of Cape Town, only a few kilometres west of his hometown. As a teenager, he enrolled in classes at the University of Cape Town Ballet School, where he was trained by Dulcie Howes and Cecily Robinson. In 1949, when he was 21, he went to London and continued his studies with Anna Northcote (also known as Anna Severskaya) at her studio on West Street. There she passed on to him the classical technique she had learned from her own teachers: Margaret Craske, Nikolai Legat, and Olga Preobrajenska.

== Performing career ==
In 1951, at age 23, Bosman joined Festival Ballet, founded the previous year by Alicia Markova and Anton Dolin to celebrate the nationwide Festival of Britain, held during the summer of 1951. With this young, ambitious company (later called London Festival Ballet, then English National Ballet), he danced in cities all over England during the next eight years, appearing in many featured roles in the repertory and scoring a particular success as the Golden Slave in an elaborate production of Michel Fokine's Scheherazade. Remarkably, he also danced all three principal male roles in Fokine's Petrushka: the title role, the Moor, and the Charlatan, the old magician who presents the puppet show that tells of Petrushka's unrequited love for the Ballerina.

In 1959, Bosman left London Festival Ballet to join the Royal Ballet as a soloist, the first dancer to do so without having attended the prestigious Royal Ballet School. At the beginning of his eighteen years with the company, he advanced rapidly through the ranks to attain the status of principal dancer. He was noted for his classical roles in Giselle, The Sleeping Beauty, and The Nutcracker as well as for such romantic roles as the Poet in Les Sylphides. In Frederick Ashton's lighthearted Les Rendezvous, he partnered Merle Park in choreography that was a challenge for them both; in Fokine's The Firebird, he played the sorcerer Koschei the Immortal who guards his soul in a magic egg; and in John Cranko's The Lady and the Fool, he played Moondog, the foolish clown with whom The Lady falls in love. He also excelled in travesty character roles, playing Carabosse in The Sleeping Beauty, Widow Simone in La Fille Mal Gardée, and an Ugly Sister in Cinderella.

During his years in London, Bosman organised dancers for performances at the Chichester and Aldeburgh festivals and produced a series of nine charity galas sponsored by members of the royal family. Working closely with Princess Margaret, he staged glittering performances featuring such stars of the ballet stage as Margot Fonteyn, Rudolf Nureyev, Merle Park, Antoinette Sibley, Anthony Dowell, Johaar Mosaval, himself, and other notables of the dance world. For his contributions to British charities, Bosman was invited to be among the guests honoured by Queen Elizabeth II at a luncheon at Buckingham Palace.

Bosman went back to southern Africa in a professional capacity at least four times during his tenure with the Royal Ballet. In 1955, he returned to Cape Town to stage, produce, and star in Petrushka for the University of Cape Town Ballet; in 1969, he appeared as guest artist with PACT Ballet in Johannesburg; and in 1970, he toured Rhodesia (now Zimbabwe) in a series of performances with Merle Park, a native of Salisbury. In 1973, he once again returned to Cape Town to stage Petrushka for CAPAB Ballet. His appearance in the title role was his farewell performance as a dancer.

== Later life and Death ==
When he retired as a performer, Bosman taught at Rosella Hightower's École Superieure de Danse de Cannes, on the French Riviera. While there, he formed a company based on the facilities at the school, the Jeune Ballet de France, Côte d'Azur, and completed foreign tours with it to Australia, Singapore, China, Korea, and Switzerland.

He moved to the United States in 1977, to join the artistic staff of the Maryland Ballet in Baltimore. When that company disbanded after a disastrous fire, he served as director of public relations for the Cultural Arts Program in the city. As a freelance choreographer and répétiteur, Bosman mounted ballets from the Royal Ballet repertory as well as his own original works for a number of American companies. His productions of Coppélia, Swan Lake, Les Patineurs, and Les Rendezvous were performed by the Lake Charles Civic Ballet Company, the Pittsburgh Ballet, the Pennsylvania Ballet, Virginia Ballet Theater, and the Milwaukee Ballet, among others.

He served as ballet master for Ballet West in Salt Lake City, Utah, and taught as guest teacher in many other schools and companies across the country. Wherever he went, he was a popular teacher and a welcome guest, known for his merry disposition, taste for fine food and drink, wicked sense of humor, and immaculate attire — except in class, where he always wore sweat pants. His last staff positions were as artistic director of the Virginia School of the Arts, in Lynchburg, and as adjunct professor of dance at nearby Sweet Briar College. During his seventeen years in Lynchburg, his "artistic flair and strong pedagogic abilities touched thousands of lives".

Bosman remained at the Virginia School of the Arts until his retirement at the end of 2006, when he was honoured with the title of artistic director emeritus. While working as a guest teacher at the Jordan Academy of Dance at Butler University in Indianapolis, Indiana, he suffered a heart attack and died at the age of 80.
