= Dulcie Howes =

South African ballet dancer, teacher, choreographer and company director

Dulcie Howes (31 December 1908 – 19 March 1993) was a South African ballet dancer, teacher, choreographer, and company director. During her performing career, she was considered the prima ballerina assoluta of South African ballet. In 1934, she established the company that evolved into today's Cape Town City Ballet.

== Early life and training ==
Dulcie Howes was born in Little Brak River, a seaside town at the mouth of the Little Brak River (Klein-Brakrivier, in Afrikaans), from which it takes its name. Located only a few miles north of Mossel Bay, a thriving harbor town established when Europeans first landed in southern Africa, Little Brak River was then a British colonial outpost, as the area was part of the Cape Colony until 1910.

Howes was the daughter of Justice Reed Howes, who had immigrated to South Africa at the end of the Second Boer War (1899-1902), and Muriel Alice (Lind) Howe. He was headmaster of Boys High School in Oudtshoorn, the "ostrich capital of the world," in the western Cape, but after his marriage he moved to Cape Town, the legislative capital of the colony, where he practiced as an advocate.

When Howes was a girl, her parents enrolled her in classes for "fancy dancing" with Miss Helen Webb. There, "dressed in a starched, white, broderie anglaise frock, with a blue satin sash round [her] very ample middle," she was taught bow to walk gracefully, how to shake hands, and how to curtsey to her elders and betters. Incidentally, she was also taught little dances for student recitals. She received more substantial dance training from Helen White, an assistant at Webb's studio who had studied abroad with the Italian maestro Enrico Cecchetti. By her, Howes was thoroughly schooled in the fundamentals of ballet technique. In 1922, at age fourteen, she became one of the first pupils of the Hershel Girls School, but in 1925, after seeing a performance by Anna Pavlova's company at the Old Opera House in Cape Town, she decided on ballet as her chosen career.

Encouraged by Webb and White, Howes traveled to London in her late teens to further her dance education. She studied the Cecchetti method of ballet training with Margaret Craske, mime technique with Tamara Karsavina, national and character dances with Friderica Derra de Morada, and Spanish dance with Elsa Brunelleschi, all the while missing no opportunity to learn about the production of stage works.

She may also have taken classes in ballroom dancing during her early twenties. In 1927, she danced for a short while with the Anna Pavlova touring company, her first professional engagement, but in 1928, she returned to South Africa with a dream of establishing a major ballet company in her home country. Her vision and her determination would eventually have a profound effect on South African dance history.

== Professional career ==
For a few years after her return to South Africa, Howes taught at private studios in Rondebosch, a suburb of Cape Town, and in Johannesburg, which was then located in the northern province of Transvaal. In 1934, a momentous event occurred that would change her life: Professor William Bell, dean of the Faculty of Music at the University of Cape Town (UCT), invited her to join the university's staff and start a ballet school. She wasted no time in doing so. Her students at this school formed the nucleus of a performing group that evolved into the UCT Ballet Company. From 1941 onward, the school included a three-year diploma course, which was expanded in 1998 to a degree program at the university level. The company toured throughout South Africa, to remote towns both large and small, and performed beyond the country's borders in Southern Rhodesia (now Zimbabwe), Northern Rhodesia (now Zambia), South West Africa (now Namibia), and Mozambique. Howes was both principal dancer and chief choreographer of the company for many years, as well as administrator, ballet mistress, wardrobe supervisor, and stagehand on occasion. By all accounts she was never more than a competent performer and, by her own admission, not a great choreographer.

Howes was also modest about her abilities as a teacher of ballet technique, which she judged to be merely adequate. Her pupils begged to disagree. Among those who made names for themselves as dancers, choreographers, producers, and teachers in companies and schools overseas were David Poole, John Cranko, Alfred Rodrigues, Johaar Mosaval, Petrus Bosman, and Desmond Doyle. From the profits generated by performances of the UCT Ballet, Howes established the Dulcie Howes Trust Fund in 1950, which offered bursaries for dancers to study abroad and provided funds to cover fees for guest artists to come to dance in South Africa.

In 1963, the South African government granted subsidies to support ballet companies in the four provinces that existed at the time: the Cape Province, Natal, Orange Free State, and Transvaal. These subsidies permitted the hiring of principal dancers and ballet masters in each of the four provincial companies. When the UCT Ballet became a full-time, professional company in 1964, it was renamed the Cape Performing Arts Board Ballet (CAPAB Ballet).

Howes became the company's artistic director and set it on a strong course into the future. Since her retirement in 1969, the company has been directed by David Poole, Veronica Paeper, and Robin van Wyk. It is known today as the Cape Town City Ballet. Howes retired as principal of the UCT Ballet School in 1972, when she was again succeeded by David Poole. The school continues to operate to this day as the UCT School of Dance.

== Works choreographed ==
Among the thirty works choreographed by Howes, the following are representative of her dramatic and musical interests.

- 1932. The Pied Piper of Hamlin, music by Wolfgang Amadeus Mozart.
- 1934. The Enchanted Well and The Vision of Delight, music by William Bell.
- 1935. Fête Champetre, music by William Bell.
- 1936. Russian Tale, music by Nikolai Rimsky-Korsakov.
- 1937. Les Images, music by Claude Debussy.
- 1938. The Coffee Cantata, music by Johann Sebastian Bach.
- 1939. La Famille, music by William Walton.
- 1940. Pastorale, music by Ludwig van Beethoven.
- 1941. Spring in the Park, music by Ernõ Dohnányi.
- 1942. Carnaval des Animaux, music by Camille Saint-Saëns.
- 1943. Rio Grande, music by Constant Lambert.
- 1944. Pliaska, music by Anatoly Lyadov.
- 1945. Fête Galante, music by Sergei Prokofiev.
- 1947. Les Diversions, music by Giaochino Rossini, arranged by Benjamin Britten.
- 1952. Vlei Legend, music by John Joubert.
- 1968. La Famille: The Intimate Recollections of an Elderly Aunt, music by Benjamin Britten.

== Honors and awards ==
For the body of her work, Howes received many honors and awards during her lifetime. They included the Award of Merit from the Cape Tercentenary Foundation in 1953, the Festival of Union Medal in 1960, and a Gold Medal from the Cecchetti Society in 1969. For the promotion of ballet in South Africa, she was awarded a medal of honour from the Suid-Afrikaanse Akademie vir Wetenskap en Kuns (South African Academy of Arts and Science) in 1970. In February 1976, she was named Patron of the local Balletomanes Society, and in June of that year, she was granted an honorary doctorate of music from the University of Cape Town. A few years later, in 1981, she was made a fellow of the Cecchetti Branch of the Imperial Society of Teachers of Dancing. This was followed by a veritable cascade of awards and honors, too numerous to mention. In 1989, she was named to the prestigious Order for Meritorious Service (Gold Class), an honor bestowed by the South African state president, and in 1991, she was given a special Nederburg Award for services to ballet.

== Personal life ==
In London in 1937, Howes married newspaperman Guy Cronwright, managing director of The Cape Times, with whom she had two daughters, Amelia and Victoria. During their formative years, both daughters shared their mother's passion for ballet. (After her marriage, Victoria Carwood became executive chairman of the Cape Town City Ballet.) In her later years, Howes was much in demand as a member of theater administration boards and was widely respected as a judge and critic on numerous dance boards.
