= Polina Semionova =

Russian ballet dancer

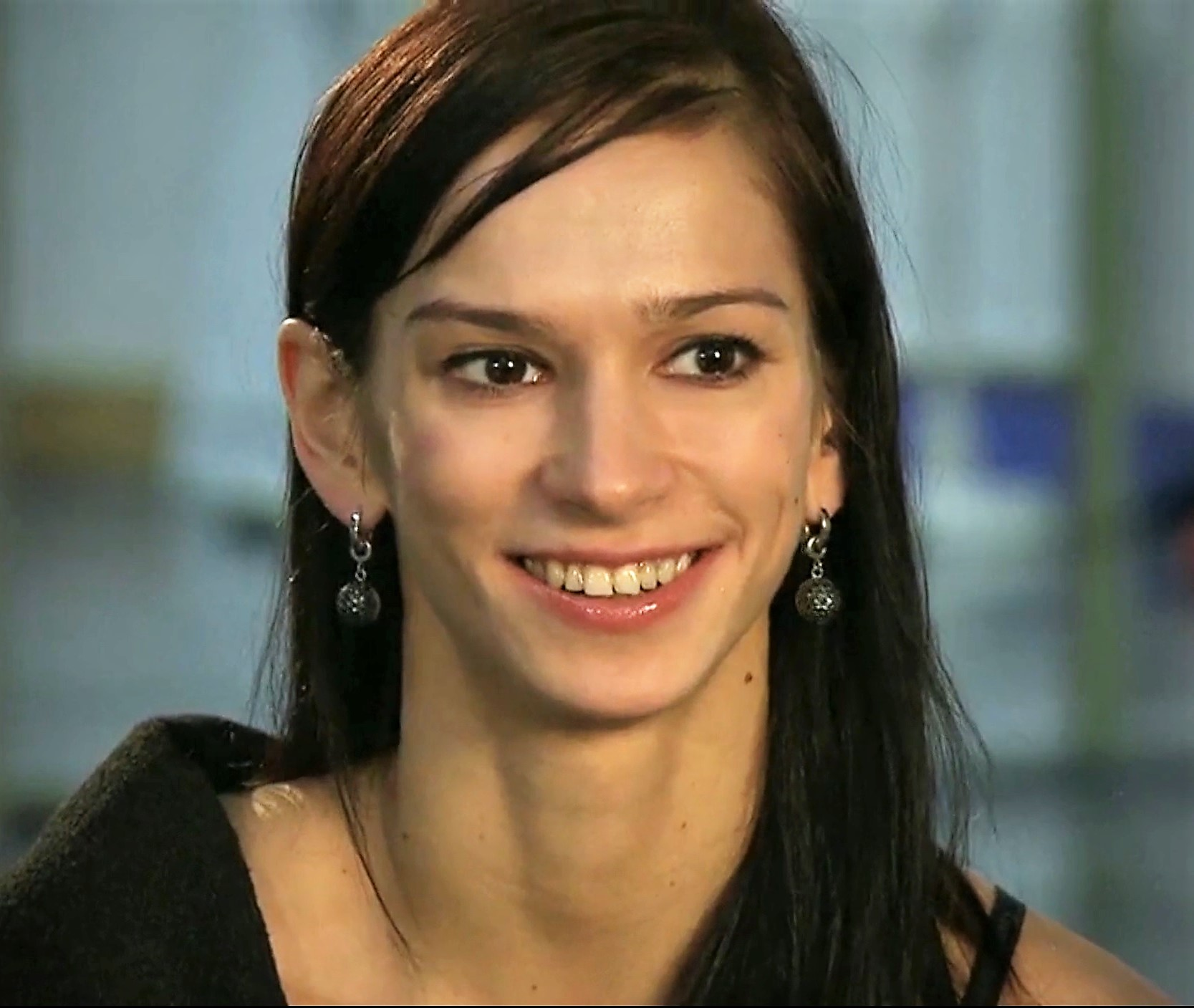
- Semionova in Making of Caravaggio documentary, 2019
- Born: 13 September 1984 (age 42); Moscow, Russia
- Occupations: Ballet dancer, professor

Polina Alexandrovna Semionova (Russian: Полина Александровна Семионова; born 13 September 1984) is a Russian ballet dancer and model for Uniqlo who was a principal dancer with the American Ballet Theatre in New York and with the Berlin State Ballet. She is a professor at the Berlin State Ballet School.

== Early life ==
Semionova was born in and grew up in Moscow, Russia. She attended Ballet school with her older brother Dmitry Semionov, who is now a principal dancer with the Staatsballett Berlin. Studying at the Bolshoi Ballet School in Moscow, she won awards in the top ballet competitions; including a gold medal at the Moscow International Ballet Competition 2001, First Prize at the Vaganova-Prix Ballet Competition in St Petersburg 2002, and Junior Prize at the Nagoya (Japan) International Ballet Competition 2002.

Graduating in 2002, Semionova joined the Berlin State Ballet as a principal upon the invitation of its artistic director Vladimir Malakhov, becoming the youngest principal in the company's history at the age of 18. She toured Japan as Malakhov's partner, the reason he had invited her to be a principal in the company. He gave her the lead roles in The Nutcracker and La Bayadère during her first season, following with the role of Tatiana in Onegin, which became her favourite role. In 2003, at the age of 19, Semionova performed with the English National Ballet in Swan Lake, receiving approving reviews from English critics. The following year she joined the California Ballet in their production of The Sleeping Beauty, again impressing critics despite what they termed a disappointing overall ballet.

Appearing in Herbert Grönemeyer's 2003 music video "Demo (Letzter Tag)", which was later uploaded to YouTube, brought her to the attention of both the dance community and the general public. Semionova is one of the featured artists on EuroArts DVD "Divine Dancers Live from Prague", in which she dances a pas-de-deux from the ballet "Manon".

In 2009 Semionova participated with the Berlin State Ballet at which she choreographed with Vladimir Malakhov.

In 2012, after a conflict with Malakhov, she moved to New York and became a principal dancer at the American Ballet Theatre. In the same year she appeared in Brian de Palma's film Passion as a ballet dancer. In 2013 she was named professor at the Berlin State Ballet School. In 2014, she returned to Berlin Staatsballett with her return-performance which was Maurice Bejart's iconic Bolero.

In 2018 Semionova had appeared in Alexei Ratmansky's La Bayadère.

In 2018 Semionova had helped The Beautiful Mind Series company to develop a perfume which will come with the smell of fresh fruits like pear and mandarin as well as freesia and white blossom. Perfume, created by perfumer and founder of the company Geza Schön, was dedicated to Polina and named «Volume 2 Precision and Grace». The same year she also was voted as Female Dancer of the Year by Tanz magazine.

== Personal life ==
Semionova is married to Mehmet Yümak who is also a dancer with the Berlin State Ballet. Together they had a baby which was born in January 2017 and for whom Semionova needed to leave and cancel any future performances with ABT.

== See also ==
- List of Russian ballet dancers
