= Cape Performing Arts Board =

Former theatre organisation in South Africa

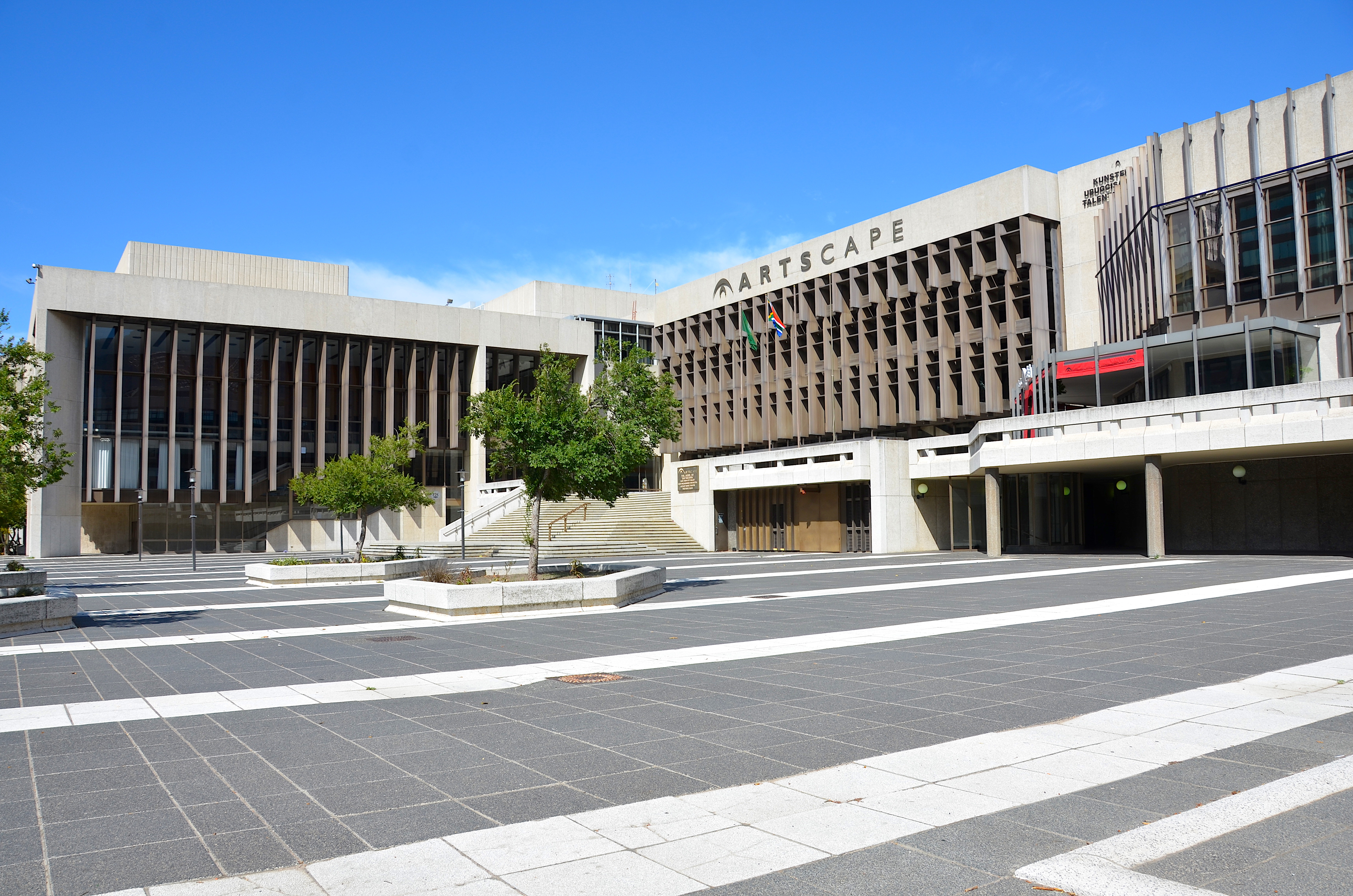
Artscape Theatre Centre, former Nico Malan Theatre

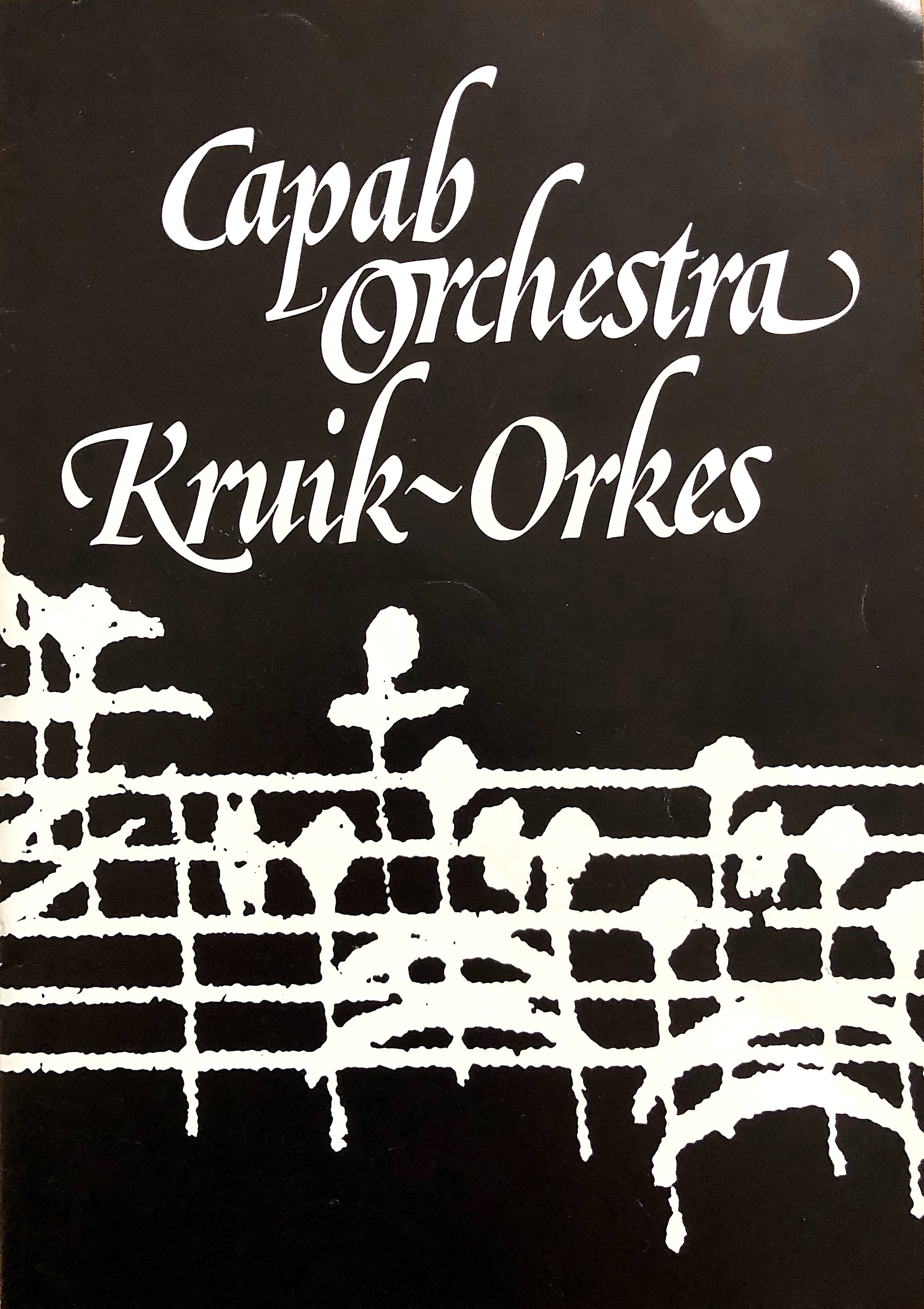
Concert Program of 1975

The Cape Performing Arts Board (CAPAB) was a South African theatre organisation based in Cape Town, serving the former Cape Province. It was one of the four state-funded performing arts councils in the four former provinces of South Africa instituted in 1963.

== History ==
In 1961, the National Theatre Organisation was disbanded and replaced by four provincial performing arts councils. In Cape Town, the Cape Performing Arts Board (CAPAB) was instituted in 1962 with the aim to promote the performing arts in the Cape Province and South Africa. The arts councils received sufficient government subsidies to fund various art forms as well as the operational requirements of the theatre facilities. Staff could be taken into permanent employment.

CAPAB opened the Nico Malan Theatre Centre on 19 May 1971, to be programmed and managed as a production house with four arts companies – orchestra, opera, ballet and drama. In line with the new South African the political dispensation and the concurrent changes, the complex was renamed the Artscape Theatre Centre in March 2001.

== Demise ==
Since 1994, government policy changed dramatically. All performing arts boards were transformed to managers of playhouses and the various arts companies had to become independent. The CAPAB Drama Department staged its last production in May 1997 with a final performance of David Mowat's The Guise, a play which has the survival of the theatre as its theme.

The new organisation, Artscape, was launched on 27 March 1999 to replace CAPAB and the Nico Malan Theatre Complex was renamed the Artscape Theatre Centre.
