= Alfred Rodrigues =

South African ballet dancer and choreographer

Alfred Rodrigues (18 August 1922 – 12 January 2002) was a South African ballet dancer and choreographer. His works have been produced by ballet and opera companies in many countries of the world.

== Early life and training ==
Born in Cape Town, a cosmopolitan city near the southern tip of South Africa, Alfred Rodrigues made his first appearance on stage as a child. In 1936, when he was 14, he saw a performance by Colonel de Basil's Ballet Russe when the company toured South Africa, and his interest in ballet was kindled. He joined the Cape Town Ballet Club in 1937 after he saw an advertisement placed in a newspaper by Dulcie Howes, asking for male dancers. Subsequently, as a student in the ballet classes of the celebrated teacher Cecily Robinson, he failed to show any particular talent as a dancer, but in workshops he did demonstrate a certain flair for choreography. He made his first ballet in 1938, a short piece for students in the Ballet Club set to a piano transcription of "Danse Macabre," a tone poem (op. 40) by Camille Saint-Saëns with spooky melodies, driving rhythms, and dramatic structure. Encouraged by Howes, he soon made two other works for the club, Le Roi s'Amuse (1940) and L'Île des Sirènes (1941).

== Professional career ==
Rodrigues's promising career as a choreographer was interrupted by the outbreak of World War II. He joined the South African army and saw combat in Egypt and Syria before being demobilized at the end of the war. In 1946, he arrived in England on a troopship, made his way to London, and resumed his dance studies with Stanislas Idzikowski and Vera Volkova, who taught at the Sadler's Wells Ballet School. One of his first dancing jobs was in the West End production of Song of Norway, the hit musical with choreography by George Balanchine. The next year, 1947, he was invited to join the Sadler's Wells Ballet, as male dancers were in short supply in postwar London. In 1949, he was promoted to soloist and was encouraged to pursue his choreographic interests, whereupon he restaged L'Île des Sirènes for a tour by Margot Fonteyn and Robert Helpmann, the stars of the company. As a dancer, he toured the United States and Canada with the company but made no mark as a performer. As a choreographer and producer, however, he was more successful, making several ballets for the Sadler's Wells Theatre Ballet that were well received.

Having won critical approval for his work, Rodrigues decided to pursue a free-lance route, concentrating on a career as a choreographer. He started in 1955 in Italy, with a production of Romeo and Juliet in the Roman amphitheater in Verona and a production of Cinderella for the Teatro alla Scala in Milan. Both ballets were set to music by Sergei Prokofiev, and both were staged especially for French ballerina Violette Verdy. After these two productions, he proceeded to mount his ballets all over the world, working in Poland, Denmark, Turkey, the United States, Chile, Japan, Germany, the Philippines, and South Africa. With his gifts for the theatrical and the dramatic, he generally favored narrative works.

=== Ballets ===
Among the works choreographed by Rodrigues are the following.

- 1938. Danse Macabre, music by Camille Saint-Saëns; for Cape Town Ballet Club.
- 1940. Le Roi s'Amuse, music by Léo Delibes; for Cape Town Ballet Club.
- 1941. L'Île des Sirènes, music by Claude Debussy; for Cape Town Ballet Club.
- 1953. Blood Wedding, music by Denis ApIvor; for Sadler's Wells Ballet, London. Based on the tragedy by Spanish dramatist Federico Garcia Lorca, this is Rodrigues's most popular work. It has been staged by numerous companies around the world.
- 1954. Café des Sports, music by Antony Hopkins; for Sadler's Wells Ballet.
- 1955. Saudades, music by Denis ApIvor; for Sadler's Wells Ballet.
- 1955. Romeo and Juliet, music by Sergei Prokofiev; for La Scala Ballet at Verona Arena. A vehicle for Violette Verdy.
- 1955. Cinderella, music by Sergei Prokofiev; for Teatro alla Scala, Milan. A vehicle for Violette Verdy.
- 1956. Casse Noisette, music by Pyotr Ilyich Tchaikovsky; for Teatro all Scala. A vehicle for Margot Fonteyn and Michael Somes.
- 1956. The Miraculous Mandarin, music by Béla Bartók; for the Royal Ballet, London. A vehicle for Michael Somes.
- 1959. Double Violin Concerto, music by Johann Sebastian Bach; for the Royal Danish Ballet, Copenhagen.
- 1960. Double Concerto, music by Antonio Vivaldi; for the Royal Ballet.
- 1961. Jabez and the Devil, music by Arnold Cooke; for the Royal Ballet. A vehicle for Antoinette Sibley.
- 1962. Le Sacre du Printemps, music by Igor Stravinsky; for the Polish National Ballet, Teatr Wielki, Warsaw.
- 1963. Soirée Musicale, music by Gioachino Rossini, orchestrated by Benjamin Britten; for Teatro alla Scala.
- 1963. Daphnis and Chloë, music by Maurice Ravel; for the Polish National Ballet.
- 1963. Orpheus, music by Igor Stravinsky; for the Polish National Ballet.
- 1963. Variaciones Concertantes, music by Alberto Ginastera; for Ballet Nacionale Santiago de Chile.
- 1970. Judith, music by Çetin Ișiközlü; for the Turkish State Ballet, Ankara and Istanbul.
- 1973. Köçekçe, music by Ulvi Cemal Erkin; for the Turkish State Ballet.
- 1974. Raymonda, music by Alexander Glazunov; for the Turkish State Ballet.
- 1974. Ondine, music by Hans Werner Henze; for the Noriko Kobayshi Theater, Tokyo.
- 1974. Navidad Nuestra, music by Ariel Ramirez; for the Philippine Dance Company, Manila.
- 1975. Symphony in Three Movements, music by Igor Stravinsky; for Theater der Stadt, Bonn.
- 1975. Souvenir, music by Pyotr Ilyich Tchaikovsky; for Theater der Stadt, Bonn.
- 1976. A Time of Parting, music by Alberto Ginestera; for CAPAB Ballet, Cape Town.
- 1979. Cinderella, music by Sergei Prokofiev; for PACT Ballet, Johannesburg

=== Dances in Operas ===
- 1954. Dido and Aeneas, music by Henry Purcell; for Sadler's Wells Ballet, London.
- 1954. La Vestale, music by Gaspare Spontini, production by Luchino Visconti; for Teatro alla Scala, Milan. A vehicle for Maria Callas.
- 1954. L'Elisir d'Amore, music by Gaetano Donizetti; for Teatro alla Scala.
- 1957. Il Turco in Italia, music by Gioachino Rossini, production by Franco Zeffirelli; for Teatro alla Scala.
- 1957. Iphigenie en Tauride, music by Christoph Willibald Gluck, production by Luchino Visconti; for Teatro alla Scala. A vehicle for Maria Callas.
- 1962. Judith, music by Arthur Honegger; for the Polish National Opera, Teatr Wielki, Warsaw.
- 1962. Prodigal Son, music by Giacomo Puccini; for the Polish National Opera.
- 1968. Punch and Judy, music by Harrison Burrwhistle; for the British National Theatre, Aldeburgh Festival/
- 1970s. The Midsummer Marriage, music by Michael Tippett; for the Royal Opera, London.
- 1972. Carmen, music by Georges Bizet; for the Turkish State Opera, Ankara and Istanbul.
- 1973. Sebastian, music by Giancarlo Menotti; for the Turkish State Opera.

=== Other works ===
Rodrigues was also active in popular musical theater, in movies, and in television productions. Among the West End musicals and revues for which he created dances are Airs on a Shoestring (1953), Joyce Grenfell Requests the Pleasure (1954), Pay the Piper (1954), Chrysanthemum (1956), Ann Veronica (1960s), and On the Brighter Side (1961). His greatest success was Charlie Girl (1963). Starring Dame Anna Neagle, it ran for five years at the Adelphi Theatre. In British film history, Rodrigues is known for An Alligator Named Daisy (1955), Oh, Rosalinda! (1955), and Show Band Parade (1957). On television, he created dances for the series Eric Robinson Presents On the Bright Side, which aired during the 1960s. His facility in creating lighthearted dances served him as well in musical theater as on the ballet stage.

== Personal and later life ==
In 1948, Rodrigues married British ballerina and teacher Julia Farron, with whom he had a son. Christopher. They were a devoted couple. In old age, Rodrigues became severely handicapped, but as late as 1996, he was in Japan to revive Cinderella for the Kobayashi company, with Farron giving him support by acting as "his legs." Wherever he worked, he was loved by his dancers for his humor, warmth, and compassion. He died at age 80 in London, after a long and unusually productive career.
