= David Poole (dancer) =

South African ballet dancer (1925–1991)

- Born: 17 September 1925; Cape Town, South Africa
- Died: 27 August 1991 (aged 65); Cape Town, South Africa
- Occupation: Ballet dancer

David Poole (17 September 1925 – 27 August 1991) was a South African ballet dancer, choreographer, teacher, and company director. During his thirty-year association with dance companies in Cape Town, he had "a profound effect on ballet in South Africa". He is internationally recognised as a significant figure in the world of dance.

== Early life and training ==
Born in Cape Town, the capital city of the Cape Province, near the southern tip of South Africa, David Poole did not begin his dance training until the age of eighteen, quite late for a dancer with professional aspirations. He trained under Cecily Robinson and Dulcie Howes at the University of Cape Town Ballet School in the early 1940s and soon began performing in the Cape Town Ballet Club, of which Howes was the director and one of the principal choreographers. He appeared to notable effect in her ballets Pliaska (1944), set to music of Liadov, and Fête Galante (1945), to music by Prokofiev. He also danced in early works by the young John Cranko, including The Soldier's Tale (1944), set to the Stravinsky score, and Tritsch-Tratsch (1945), a jolly work set to the high-spirited polka of the same name by Johann Strauss II.

In performances of these works Poole's particular talent was recognised by Howes, who added a special solo for him to her ballet entitled Suite (1936), set to music by Bach, and who recommended him for a bursary for study abroad.

Consequently, Poole moved to London in 1947, when he was 22, and continued his studies at the Sadler's Wells Ballet School. There, under the strong supervision of Ninette de Valois and the administration of Arnold Haskell, he flourished, becoming proficient in classical ballet technique in remarkably short order.

== Career in Europe ==
Soon after beginning his studies in London, Poole was invited to join the Sadler's Wells Theater Ballet, where he was promoted to principal dancer in 1948.

He enjoyed quick recognition by both fans and the press, winning praise particularly for his performances as Pierrot in Fokine's merry romp Le Carnaval and in de Valois's gloomy and ghostly depiction of The Haunted Ballroom. He transferred to the Sadler's Wells Ballet at Covent Garden in 1955, but he left the company (renamed the Royal Ballet) in 1956 to dance with Ballet Rambert, where he appeared in such classic works as Giselle, Coppélia, and Swan Lake. During the first six months of 1957, he took leave from the stage to teach ballet technique at Kurt Jooss's Folkwang Schule in Essen, Germany, after which he returned to Britain and resumed his performing career, appearing with notable success at the Edinburgh Festival in 1958.

During his twelve years dancing in Great Britain, he performed in numerous new works choreographed by de Valois, Cranko, Frederick Ashton, Andrée Howard, Walter Gore, Kenneth MacMillan, and Alfred Rodrigues, among others.

== Roles created ==
Poole created soloist or principal roles in the following works:

- 1949. Sea Change, choreography by John Cranko; music by Jean Sibelius. Role: The Skipper.
- 1949. Beauty and the Beast, choreography by John Cranko; music by Maurice Ravel. Role: The Beast.
- 1951. Pineapple Poll, choreography by John Cranko; music by Sir Arthur Sullivan, arranged by Sir Charles Mackerras. Role: Jasper the Pot Boy.
- 1953. Blood Wedding, choreography by Alfred Rodrigues; music by Denis ApIvor. Role: Leonardo.
- 1954. The Lady and the Fool, choreography by John Cranko; music by Giuseppi Verdi, arranged by Sir Charles Mackerras. Role: Prince of Aragonza.
- 1955. Danses Concertantes, choreography by Kenneth MacMillan; music by Igor Stravinsky.
- 1955. House of Birds, choreography by Kenneth MacMillan; music by Federico Mompou.
- 1958. The Night and the Silence, choreography by Walter Gore; music by J.S. Bach, arranged by Sir Charles Mackerras.
- 1958. The Great Peacock, choreography by Sir Peter Wright; music by Humphrey Searle.

== Career in South Africa ==
Poole had returned to South Africa several times over the years to stage works for the University of Cape Town Ballet. On his first visit, in 1952, he mounted Ashton's Les Rendezvous, Cranko's Sea Change, and a version of the final act of The Nutcracker, set in the Kingdom of the Sweets. In 1957, he staged Ashton's Les Patineurs and Cranko's Beauty and the Beast, in which he partnered Patricia Miller, another South African who had trained and danced in London. He also produced his own version of The Firebird, set to the Stravinsky score. For the Union Festival in May 1960 he staged two one-act works by South African choreographers: Blood Wedding by Rodrigues and Pineapple Poll by Cranko. In 1961, he mounted a full, three-act version of Sylvia, to the score by Delibes, a spectacular work that was later, in 1963, produced in Johannesburg.

In 1963, the South African government granted subsidies to support ballet companies in the four provinces that existed at the time: the Cape Province, Natal, Orange Free State and Transvaal. Poole was employed as ballet master of the University of Cape Town Ballet and was responsible for staging a full-evening production of The Sleeping Beauty, with choreography after Marius Petipa. When UCT Ballet became a full-time, professional company in 1965, it was renamed the Cape Performing Arts Board Ballet (CAPAB Ballet). Poole continued as ballet master of CAPAB Ballet (since renamed the Cape Town City Ballet) and, upon the retirement of Dulcie Howes in 1969, became the artistic director in 1970. Among the original works he created for the company are The Snow Queen (1961), to music by Tchaikovsky, A Midsummer Night's Dream (1970), to music by Handel, and Variations for Men (1983), to music by Khachaturian.

Notable among the ballets that Poole mounted for CAPAB Ballet are three works on South African themes: Le Cirque (1972), The Rain Queen (1973), and Kami (1976). Both Le Cirque, set to music by Bach, and Kami, based on a play by C. Louis Leipoldt, Die Laaste Aand (The Last Evening), and set to music by Bizet and Michael Tuffin, deal with the government policy of apartheid (literally, "apart-hood"), the major social issue in twentieth-century South Africa. Le Cirque was a dramatic attack on government repression; Kami (Sanskrit, "of fulfilled desires") was a grim tale of interracial marriage and the mysterious death of a government official. The Rain Queen, a work conceived by choreographer Frank Staff, was set to a commissioned score by Graham Newcater and had décor and costumes by Raimond Schoop. Telling the legend of Modjadji, the hereditary queen of the Lobedu people who was thought to have the power to bring rain to a drought-stricken land, it was planned as the first full-length ballet with a scenario derived from an indigenous South African legend. Poole dedicated the ballet to the memory of Staff, a revered and renowned South African artist.

Besides these original works, Poole enriched the company repertory with new productions of classic ballets, including Giselle, Le Corsaire, Coppélia, and Swan Lake. Not only an accomplished choreographer and a visionary company director, he was a superb teacher of classical technique, mime, and stagecraft, raising the levels of performance and training in the company to a significant degree. In 1974, upon the retirement of Dulcie Howes, he was appointed principal of the UCT Ballet School. He also served as professor of ballet until 1986 and as director of the company until his retirement in 1990.

== Legacy ==
The charity Dance for All, originally called Ballet for All, was the brainchild of David Poole. It was set up to bring dance to underprivileged children living in the non-white townships on the borders of Cape Town. The David Poole Trust Fund still supports extensive educational development and dance programs in disadvantaged areas of the city.
