= Festival (Canadian TV series) season 6 =

Festival
- Season 6
- No. of episodes: 32

Release
- Original network: CBC
- Original release: 15 September 1965 – 6 July 1966

Season chronology
- ← Previous; Season 5 Next → Season 7

The sixth season of the Canadian television anthology series Festival broadcast on CBC Television from 15 September 1965 to 6 July 1966. Thirty-two new episodes aired this season.

== Synopsis ==
Karl Böhm conducts the Toronto Symphony Orchestra performing the "Haffner" Symphony by Mozart, Beethoven's Leonore Overture, and the Die Meistersinger Overture by Wagner. Françoys Bernier conducts Schubert's Unfinished Symphony. Albert Lotto plays Piano Concerto No. 1 by Franz Liszt. Pianist Michel Legrand performs compositions from The Umbrellas of Cherbourg with singer Claire Gagnier and others. Barry Callaghan hosts blues greats Brownie McGhee (guitar) Sonny Terry (harmonica), Willie Dixon (bass/guitar), Jesse Fuller (one-man band), singer Mable Hillery, singers Sunnyland Slim (piano), Big Joe Williams (guitar), Booker White (guitar), and Muddy Waters with his band. Seiji Ozawa conducts with violinist James Buswell performing 1920s compositions by Maurice Ravel, two by Stravinsky, and jazz-influenced An American in Paris by George Gershwin. Pianist/Comedian Victor Borge plays Rachmaninoff and duets with Leonid Hambro. Peter Schickele plays La campanella by Liszt. Jack Pohr performs Zigeunerweisen (Gypsy Airs) by Pablo de Sarasate. New York musicians play Cantata Iphigenia in Brooklyn, by P. D. Q. Bach. American Yehudi Menuhin and Canadian Glenn Gould play Arnold Schoenberg's Phantasy, Sonata No. 4 by Johann Sebastian Bach, and Sontata No. 10 by Beethoven. German vionist Dr. Hermann Scherchen conducts the Toronto Chamber Orchestra in J.S. Bach's The Art of Fugue. CBC Talent Festival finalists appear at Massey Hall and Place des Arts with orchestras conducted by Sir Wilfrid Pelletier, Sir Ernest MacMillan and John Avison, performing Mozart, Édouard Lalo, Charpentier, Giacomo Puccini, and Kent Kennan.

Tenor Jon Vickers sings from Beethoven's only opera Fidelio, and selections from Die Walküre by Wagner. Festival aired Gioachino Rossini's 1816 opera The Barber of Seville conducted by Otto-Werner Mueller after it won an international Emmy Award on the CBC French sister-network Société Radio Canada series L'Heure du concert in March 1965. Similarly, Murray Schafer's opera Loving (Toi) appeared on both The Concert Hour and Festival with Serge Garant conducting. Sergei Prokofiev's ballet Romeo and Juliet is performed, choreographed by John Cranko. Melissa Hayden and Edward Villella, of the New York City Ballet, perform Pas de deux choreographed by George Balanchine to music by Tchaikovsky. Percy Rodriguez narrates Countee Cullen's poetry, to Moe Koffman's jazz, and Charlotte De Neve's dance choreography. Host Theodore Bikel sings folk songs, with Catherine McKinnon, Willie Dunn, and Odetta.

John Gielgud recites an anthology of Shakespeare works, encompassing emotions and behavior across the "Ages of Man". Plays this season include Henrik Ibsen's 3-act A Doll's House (1879), George Bernard Shaw's "love and war" comedy Arms and the Man (1894), and Oscar Wilde's four-act An Ideal Husband (1895). Modern-era plays include Seán O'Casey's Irish drama Juno and the Paycock (1924), Jean Anouilh's Romeo and Jeannette (1946), Albert Camus' play based on a true story, Les Justes (The Just Assassins) (1949), George Bloomfield's television adaptation of James Forsyth's play Héloïse (1951), which is based on the story of Abelard and Héloïse, and Ray Lawler's drama Summer of the Seventeenth Doll (1955). Contemporary plays include Robert Anderson's drama Silent Night, Lonely Night (1959), American novelist and playwright Thornton Wilder's one-act Childhood (1960), William Hanley's Whisper Into My Good Ear (1962) for which he won the Vernon Rice Award, and Edna O'Brien's Irish tragedy A Cheap Bunch of Nice Flowers (1962). Autobiographical portrayals include Jack Creley as John Kenneth Galbraith, author of best-selling book The Scotch (1963), released in the UK as The Non-potable Scotch: A Memoir of the Clansmen in Canada. Playwright/novelist George Ryga's Man Alive is an original epic drama play written expressly for Festival, and aired with Len Birman in the lead role. Teleplays include, George Salverson's The Murderer based on Fyodor Dostoevsky's novel Crime and Punishment (1866), Marc Brandel's Ashes to Ashes, and two from John Hopkins, A Game – Like – Only a Game, and the drama Horror of Darkness.

== Notable guest cast ==
In addition to individuals cast this season, organizations include the CBC Symphony Orchestra, the Toronto Symphony Orchestra, the Toronto Chamber Orchestra, the Festival Singers of Canada, the National Ballet of Canada ...

- Lawrence Adams
- John Avison
- Bernard Behrens
- Françoys Bernier
- Theodore Bikel
- Len Birman
- Karl Böhm
- Victor Borge
- W. B. Brydon
- Geneviève Bujold
- James Oliver Buswell IV
- Barry Callaghan
- Susan Clark
- James Cotton
- Jack Creley
- Colleen Dewhurst
- Willie Dixon
- Peter Donat
- Willie Dunn
- Pierre Duval
- Ralph Endersby
- Celia Franca
- Jesse Fuller
- Claire Gagnier
- John Gielgud
- Glenn Gould
- Nonnie Griffin
- Georges Groulx
- Garrick Hagon
- Leonid Hambro
- Melissa Hayden
- Mable Hillery
- Eric House
- Frances Hyland
- Michael Kane
- John Kastner
- Moe Koffman
- Paul Koslo
- Andrée Lachapelle
- Heath Lamberts
- Michael Learned
- Cosette Lee
- Michel Legrand
- Angela Leigh
- Monique Leyrac
- Marilyn Lightstone
- Ernest MacMillan
- James Madison
- Phyllis Mailing
- Paul Massie
- Neil McCallum
- Brownie McGhee
- Catherine McKinnon
- Yehudi Menuhin
- Barry Morse
- Otto-Werner Mueller
- Odetta
- Seiji Ozawa
- Gerard Parkes
- Adrian Pecknold
- Wilfrid Pelletier
- Jennifer Phipps
- Douglas Rain
- Liam Redmond
- Norma Renault
- Roland Richard
- Percy Rodriguez
- Michael Sarrazin
- Robert Savoie
- Hermann Scherchen
- Peter Schickele
- Chuck Shamata
- Ola Skanks
- Sunnyland Slim
- Otis Spann
- Grant Strate
- Sean Sullivan
- Veronica Tennant
- Sonny Terry
- John Vernon
- Jon Vickers
- Edward Villella
- Muddy Waters
- Sandy Webster
- Booker White
- Chris Wiggins
- Big Joe Williams
- Peter Wyngarde
- Jeannette Zarou

== Production ==
This season, Festival began presenting multi-part episodes at irregular intervals, starting with "Music and Drama on [the] Same Program" which aired 27 October, combining the concert "Double Bill: Karl Böhm and Jon Vickers" with the one-act drama play Childhood by Thornton Wilder.

Earlier in March, CBC Television had made an announcement offering free tickets to attend the 27 March concert to be recorded at Massey Hall in Toronto, featuring Canadian tenor Jon Vickers singing, and Austrian Karl Böhm conducting the Toronto Symphony Orchestra. Music aficionados were quick to acquire tickets, eliciting a large enthusiastic audience. The venerated hall, which opened in 1894, and was renovated in 1933, had undergone another transformation of the stage. The dark wood backdrop panels had been replaced with a lightly colored superstructure including tiers for orchestra members and a high balcony platform, which Vikers put to good use in his vocal performance.

Franz Kraemer's production of Mozart's The Magic Flute had a cast of 123, a 60-piece orchestra, an off-camera chorus, and a mobile, polyfoam-scaled, 75-foot fire-breathing dragon with electric eyes and lashing tongue. It took twelve men to operate it from within.

== Episodes ==
Notes:

- Three episodes were season five reruns; "Let Me Count the Ways" on 10 November 1965, "Ricter and Forrester - In Praise of Great Performers" on 22 June 1966, and "Music In Camera - In Praise of Great Performers" on 29 June 1966.
- Two season six episodes aired twice; "Romeo and Juliet" on 2 March 1966, and "Heritage" on 9 February 1966.
- Other weeks were pre-empted by other programming; pro football on 17 November 1965; an NFB documentary, "Buy Low, Sell High" on 27 April 1966; The Bob Hope Vietnam Christmas Show and an episode of Cariboo Country called "How to Break a Quarterhorse" on 19 January 1966; a re-broadcast of the NFB documentary Bethune on 9 February 1966; and on 16 March 1966, the NFB documentary Memorandum (1965) with the 1963 short film La contrebasse ("Contre Basse") directed by Maurice Fasquel, which he adapted from Anton Chekhov's short story Roman s kontrabasom. Fasquel's film won an award at the San Sebastián International Film Festival.
- Festival also had short presentations that followed programing by other corporations and producers:
  - The week of 8 December 1965 the Festival time-slot was used to air the 75-minute BBC film Culloden originally broadcast on 14 December 1964. The remaining 15 minutes of air-time (totaling 90 minutes) was filled with a song recital by Montreal singer Monique Leyrac who had won the top award at an international song festival in Sopot, Poland that summer. These two segments were rerun the week of 13 April 1966.
  - The week of 16 February 1966 the first hour of Festival aired the NFB 44-minute documentary Ladies and Gentlemen... Mr. Leonard Cohen produced by John Kemeny, followed by the half-hour Festival episode, "The Scotch".

No. overall	No. in season	Title	Directed by	Written by	Original release date	Ref.
132	1	"Romeo and Juliet"	Norman Campbell ^{TV} Celia Franca ^{Art}	Play by : William Shakespeare; Music by : Sergei Prokofiev; Choreography by : John Cranko	15 September 1965	
Please add a Plot Summary here, replacing this text. For guidance, see How to write a plot summary. Episode summaries must be expressed in your own words. Do NOT submit content you find from another web site as it is plagiarism and likely a copyright violation, which Wikipedia cannot accept and will be removed or reverted. Superficially modifying copyrighted content or closely paraphrasing it, even if the source is cited, still constitutes a copyright violation. As per Television Plot Manual of Style,^{MOS:TVPLOT} summaries should be about 100 to 200 words in length, and those substantially less than 100 words are most likely to be scrutinized for possible copyright violation. Notable Cast: Veronica Tennant as Juliet, Lawrence Adams, Celia Franca, Angela Leigh, Grant Strate, et al. Notes: Performed by the National Ballet of Canada. Musical director: George Crum. Duration: 90 mintes. The production won the Prix Rene Barthelemy for artistic excellence at the 1966 international Monte-Carlo Television Festival.
133	2	"A Cheap Bunch of Nice Flowers"	George Bloomfield	Play by : Edna O'Brien; Adapted by : Alvin Goldman	22 September 1965	
134	3	"A Game – Like – Only a Game"	Eric Till	John Hopkins	29 September 1965	
Please add a Plot Summary here, replacing this text. For guidance, see How to write a plot summary and the Television Plot Manual of Style.^{MOS:TVPLOT} Cast: Cosette Lee, Diana Maddox, John Vernon, Bill Glover, Christine Bennett, Leslie Yeo, Rex Sevenoaks, Alan Baulch, and Miles Palmer. Notes: John Hopkins' teleplay also aired later on the BBC series The Wednesday Play on 16 February 1966 with a different cast.
135	4	"Romeo and Jeannette"	Paul Almond	Play by : Jean Anouilh; Translated by : Miriam John	6 October 1965	
136	5	"Horror of Darkness"	Paul Almond	John Hopkins	13 October 1965	
137	6	"Summer of the Seventeenth Doll"	Peter Boretski	Ray Lawler	20 October 1965	
138	7	"Double Bill: Karl Böhm and Jon Vickers"	Unknown	Mozart · Beethoven · Wagner	27 October 1965	
138	7	"Childhood"	Curt Reis	Thornton Wilder	27 October 1965	
Part 1 (60 minutes). Double Bill: Karl Böhm and Jon Vickers: Canadian tenor Jon Vickers from Prince Albert, Saskatchewan, and celebrated European conductor Karl Böhm from Graz, Styria Austria, making his North American television debut, are featured together in a "Double Bill" concert taped earlier on 27 March to a live audience at Toronto's Massey Hall. Boehm conducts the Toronto Symphony Orchestra performing the "Haffner" Symphony No. 35 in D Major (K. 385) by Wolfgang Amadeus Mozart. Vickers sings Florestan's Aria from Act II of Fidelio, originally titled Leonore, or The Triumph of Marital Love, Ludwig van Beethoven's only opera. The orchestra then performs Beethoven's Leonore Overture. Enter Vickers again, this time on the high platform to sing the "Sword Monologue" (Siegmund's Ein Schwert verhieß mir vater) and the "Spring Song" both from Act I of Richard Wagner's Ring of the Nibelung cycle Die Walküre (The Valkyrie), followed by Boehm conducting the orchestra to perform the Overture from Wagner's Die Meistersinger von Nürnberg. Notes: Executive producer: Franz Kraemer. Producer, Bill Bolt. Part 2 (30 minutes). Childhood: Please add a Plot Summary here, replacing this text. For guidance, see How to write a plot summary and the Television Plot Manual of Style.^{MOS:TVPLOT} Cast: The parents are played by Sean Sullivan and Vanya Franck, and the children (Caroline, Dodie and Billie) are played by Deborah Hancock, Kirstin Campbell, and Danny McIlravey (Billie). Producer: Gordon Hinch.
139	8	"The Barber of Seville"	Unknown	Gioachino Rossini	3 November 1965	
Please add a Plot Summary here, replacing this text. For guidance, see How to write a plot summary and the Television Plot Manual of Style.^{MOS:TVPLOT} Cast: Robert Savoie, Claire Gagnier, Fernande Chiocchio, Pierre Duval, Napoléon Bisson, Yoland Guérard, and Roland Richard. Notes: Producer, Pierre Morin. Orchestra conductor, Otto-Werner Mueller. Previously aired on CBC's French Network on L'Heure du concert (The Concert Hour) on 7 Mar 1965, the program earned an Emmy Award for exceptional quality in a TV program produced outside the USA.
140	9	"Romance in Music"	Unknown	Schubert · Tchaikovsky · Liszt; Choreography by : George Balanchine	24 November 1965	
140	9	"Heloise and Abelard"	George Bloomfield	Play by : James Forsyth; Adapted by : George Bloomfield	24 November 1965	
Part 1 (60 minutes). Romance in Music: Françoys Bernier conducts a symphony orchestra performing "The Unfinished" Symphony No. 8 in B minor, (D 759) by Franz Schubert. Principal dancers Melissa Hayden and Edward Villella, of the New York City Ballet, perform Pas de deux choreographed by George Balanchine to music by Pyotr Ilyich Tchaikovsky. New York pianist Albert Lotto plays Piano Concerto No. 1 by Franz Liszt. Notes: Produced by Pierre Morin in Montreal. Part 1 aired at 8:30 PM to accommodate the next half. Part 2 (90 minutes). Heloise and Abelard: Please add a Plot Summary here, replacing this text. For guidance, see How to write a plot summary and the Television Plot Manual of Style.^{MOS:TVPLOT} Cast: Michael Kane (Abelard), Susan Clark (Heloise), Len Birman, Jack Creley, James Edmond, and Bernard Behrens.
141	10	"Silent Night, Lonely Night"	Eric Till	Robert Anderson	1 December 1965	
142	11	"Juno and the Paycock"	Peter Boretski	Seán O'Casey	15 December 1965	
143	12	"The Songs of Man"	Paddy Sampson	Traditionals; Teleplay by : Martin Lavut, Stan Daniels	22 December 1965	
143	12	"Whisper Into My Good Ear"	Mervyn Rosenzveig	William Hanley	22 December 1965	
143	12	"The Ages of Man"	David Susskind	William Shakespeare	22 December 1965	
Part 1 (60 minutes). The Songs of Man: Theodore Bikel host an hour of folk songs from various parts of the world he has visited. Able to speak sixteen languages, Bikel sings Russian, Spanish, Hebrew, and Zulu folk songs, including You Can Tell a Man by His Song. Performers include, the Quebec vocal quartet Les Cailloux singing Alouette; Canadian folk artist Willie Dunn, of mixed Mi'kmaq and Scottish/Irish heritage, sings Still On Time and The Tears Still Fall Within My Mind; Canadian folk artist Catherine McKinnon, who appears on CBC-TV's Don Messer Jubilee, sings The First Time Ever I Saw Your Face and Ariskay Love Lilt; from a remote location at a cloth milling party in Cape Breton Island, the Cape Breton Singers sing Gaelic songs; a group of twelve girls and a boy called La Famille Brassard sing two French songs; and American folk singer Odetta performs How Shall I Send Thee, My Boy, Sweet Potatoes and Glory Be. Together, Bikel and Odetta sing Down by the Riverside. Notes: Produced by Paddy Sampson. Part 2 (45 minutes). Whisper Into My Good Ear: Please add a Plot Summary here, replacing this text. For guidance, see How to write a plot summary and the Television Plot Manual of Style.^{MOS:TVPLOT} Cast Barry Morse and Budd Knapp. Part 3 (15 minutes). The Ages of Man: John Gielgud recites an anthology of passages from Shakespeare's works, including plays, sonnets, and excerpts from roles he has portrayed, sharing the emotions and behaviour expressed within the seven ages of man. Notes: Produced by David Susskind. Edited for Festival by Ron Garant.
144	13	"No Two People"	Norman Campbell	Stan Daniels	29 December 1965	
Joseph Shaw and Mary Savidge, who are husband and wife in real life, act together as a team in this half-hour of light-hearted vignettes, anecdotes, sketches, and views, about which, compiler Stan Daniels describes as, "a collection, pot-potpourri, salad, menagerie of aphorisms, verses, theatre pieces, words, concerning, pertaining to, touching upon the institution, establishment, way of life, social form, fact, known as marriage – neither a complete nor representative nor particularly fair anthology, but a more-or-less random sampling of thoughts and feelings on the matter, by minds great and not so great." It contains bits and pieces of Pierre Berton, Charles Dickens, Frank Loesser, Ogden Nash, Dorothy Parker, Rousseau, Edmund Spencer, and Oscar Wilde, among others. Notes: Produced by Norman Campbell, it was preceded by a 60-minute Intertel documentary, "Children of Revolution" that aired in the Festival 9:30 PM time-slot.
145	14	"An Ideal Husband"	Mario Prizek	Oscar Wilde	5 January 1966	
146	15	"Introducing Michel Legrand"	Unknown	Michel Legrand	12 January 1966	
146	15	"Heritage"	Leo Orenstein	Poem by : Countee Cullen; Music by : Moe Koffman; Choreography by : Charlotte De Neve; Adaptation by : Leo Orenstein	12 January 1966	
Part 1 (60 minutes). Introducing Michel Legrand: Hosting this one-hour program, Montreal actress Geneviève Bujold introduces viewers to French composer, pianist, conductor and singer Michel Legrand. Legrand performs two compositions including the tender love theme from his movie opera The Umbrellas of Cherbourg, winner of the Grand Prix at the 1964 Cannes Film Festival. His versatility is demonstrated by his compositions, Da Wee Da, Qui Es-Tu?, Les Grands Musiciens, "1964", Sans Toi, and Fragile. Canadian singer Claire Gagnier, French Canadian actress Andrée Lachapelle, Colette Devlin, and Elaine Bedard assists Legrand in a few performances. Produced by Pierre Morin. Part 2 (30 minutes). Heritage: Poetry, music, dance, and acting tell the story. Percy Rodriguez narrates the words of American author Countee Cullen, reciting his poem, with music by jazz flautist Moe Koffman, African drums by Dick Smith and Ivor Lloyd, and dance choreography by Charlotte De Neve, performed by Beth Harry, Al Harris, Ola Skanks, and Marianne Skanks. The poetic study expresses the thoughts and loneliness of an African man's cultural heritage within the big-cities of modern-day North America. Actor Mel Scott portrays the man depicted by the voice of Rodriguez.
147	16	"The Just"	Peter Boretski	Play by : Albert Camus; Adapted by : Bernard Frechtman	26 January 1966	
148	17	"Ashes to Ashes"	Eric Till	Teleplay by : Marc Brandel	2 February 1966	
149	18	"The Scotch"	Mervyn Rosenzveig	Memoir by : John Kenneth Galbraith	16 February 1966	
150	19	"The Blues"	Paddy Sampson	Music by : Blues artists	23 February 1966	
150	19	"The Murderer"	Paul Almond	Written by : Fyodor Dostoevsky; Teleplay by : George Salverson	23 February 1966	
Part 1 (60 minutes). The Blues: Several of America's greatest living blues performers assemble together for the first time in a television studio. Barry Callaghan hosts this one-hour unrehearsed session of music and conversation, in which, in their own words, the musicians discuss and define the blues, and elaborate on its origins, history, styles, and its meaning to them personally. Featured musicians include folk/blues singer-guitarist Brownie McGhee and singer-harmonica player Sonny Terry, singer and guitarist/bassist Willie Dixon, Georgia-born one-man band musician Jesse Fuller, singer Mable Hillery, singer and pianist Sunnyland Slim, singer and guitarist Big Joe Williams, singer and guitarist Booker White, "father of modern Chicago blues" Muddy Waters and his band including Otis Spann (piano), James Cotton (harmonica), Samuel Longhorn (guitar), James Madison (guitar), and Jimmy Lee Morris (bass). Notes: In Season 7, "The Blues" was re-edited with additional footage as a 90-minute version which aired on 28 December 1966. Executive Producer, Robert Allen. Producer, Paddy Sampson. Studio Director, Patrick King. Part 2 (90 minutes). The Murderer: Please add a Plot Summary here, replacing this text. For guidance, see How to write a plot summary and the Television Plot Manual of Style.^{MOS:TVPLOT} Cast: Geneviève Bujold (Sonia), Paul Koslo (Raskolnikov), Douglas Rain (Forfiry), Budd Knapp (Marmeladov), Gerard Parkes (Nikolai), Norma Renault (Katerina), Nan Stewart (Ilyona), Bernard Behrens (Zamyatov), William Osler (Koch), Dermot Grice (Pestrayak), Kirstin Campbell (Polya), Timon Tully (Kolya), and Susan Bird (Leeda).
151	20	"Stravinsky"	Roman Kroiter, Wolf Koenig	Unknown	9 March 1966	
151	20	"The Violinist"	Unknown	Unknown	9 March 1966	
151	20	"Richard Burton"	John Ormond	Unknown	9 March 1966	
Part 1 (60 minutes). Stravinsky: This is a one-hour joint CBC Television / National Film Board of Canada production about Igor Stravinsky's effort to definiatively record Symphony of Psalms, working with the CBC Symphony Orchestra and the Festival Singers of Canada at Massey Hall, Toronto. The show also takes a candid look at Stravinsky as he chats with friends and associates and makes an Atlantic sea crossing to Germany. It includes conversations with his assistant, conductor Robert Craft, his wife Vera de Bosset Stravinsky, and others, along with a New York City visit to choreographer George Balanchine's studio. Significant excerpts from Symphony of Psalms are also heard. Part 2 (15 minutes). The Violinist: Please add a summary here as per WP:PLOTSUM & MOS:TVPLOT. Part 3 (15 minutes). Richard Burton: An interview with actor Richard Burton, about his life, recent work with Welsh actor Michael Elwyn, his method to acting and how he began, and future plans. It is a BBC production by Welsh poet and filmmaker John Ormond in Ireland during location filming for The Spy Who Came in from the Cold (1965).
152	21	"The Magic Flute"	Franz Kraemer	Opera by : Mozart; Libretto by : Emanuel Schikaneder, Carl Ludwig Giesecke; English v. by : Ruth and Thomas Martin, Edward J. Dent; Choreography by : Don Gillies	23 March 1966	
This 155-minute Franz Kraemer production of Wolfgang Amadeus Mozart's 1791 two-act opera The Magic Flute utilized a cast of 123, a 60-piece orchestra conducted by Walter Susskind, the Festival Singers of Toronto performing the chorus pieces off-camera directed by Elmer Iseler, and a 75-foot fire-breathing dragon! Amongst the cast are singers from the Metropolitan Opera (Met), the New York City Opera (NYCO), and other prominent individuals. The principal cast includes Met tenor George Shirley in the role of Prince Tamino, NYCO soprano Beverly Sills as the Queen of the Night, Met soprano Mary Ellen Pracht as Princess Pamina, NYCO/Met baritone John Reardon as Papageno the bird-catcher, soprano Eleanor Calbes as Papagena, Scottish bass-baritone David Ward as the High Priest Sarastro, and tenor Garnet Brooks as Monostatos, the lecherous Moor. The cast is supported by singers Gaelyne Gabora (First Lady), Joan Patenaude, and Patricia Rideout who portray the Three Ladies, attendants of the Queen of the Night; Geoffrey Clarkfield, Michael Hamilton, and Douglas Gham act on-stage as the Three Spirits, and voicing the Three Spirits are Mary Lou Fallis, Joanne Morrow, and Lynda Sinclair, coached by Lloyd Bradshaw; Howell Glynne (First Priest), Andrew MacMillan (Second Priest), and Mel Scott (Third Priest); John Arab and Maurice Brown as Two Men in Armor; Phil Stark, Arthur Spy, and Walter Williamson portray Three Slaves; and Gillie Fenwick is cast as the Speaker.
153	22	"Man Alive"	George Bloomfield	George Ryga	30 March 1966	
154	23	"Bernard Shaw: Who the Devil Was He?"	Vincent Tovell	Autobiography by : George Bernard Shaw; Teleplay by : Lister Sinclair	19 May 1965	
154	23	"Arms and the Man"	Leon Major	George Bernard Shaw	6 April 1966	
Part 1 (60 minutes). Bernard Shaw: Who the Devil Was He?: Note: This segment is a re-broadcast of the season five episode, "Bernard Shaw: Who the Devil Was He?" Part 2 (30 minutes). Arms and the Man: Please add a Plot Summary here, replacing this text. For guidance, see How to write a plot summary and the Television Plot Manual of Style.^{MOS:TVPLOT} Cast: Helen Conway, Peter Donat, Betty Leighton, and Carole Zorro.
155	24	"The Exquisite Twenties"	Franz Kraemer	Ravel · Stravinsky · Gershwin · Lehár	20 April 1966	
155	24	"Dylan Revisited"	Paul Almond	Poetry by : Dylan Thomas; Adapted by : Paul Almond	20 April 1966	
Part 1 (60 minutes). The Exquisite Twenties: In an hour of music from the 1920s, the Toronto Symphony Orchestra, conducted by Seiji Ozawa, performs Maurice Ravel's choreographic poem La valse as dancers Cyrel Kavel, Ken Walsh, Marlene York, and Jim Hunter waltz to the music. American violinist James Oliver Buswell IV and six instrumentalists from the orchestra play Waltz and Ragtime from the 1918 theatrical work L'Histoire du soldat by Igor Stravinsky. The orchestra and Buswell perform the third and fourth movements, Aria and Capriccio, from Stravinsky's Violin Concerto in D (1931). The orchestra performs the jazz-influenced symphonic poem An American in Paris (1928) by American composer George Gershwin with dancers moving in-time, and Franz Lehár's waltz Gold und Silber (Gold and Silver, 1902). Produced by Franz Kraemer. Part 2 (30 minutes). Dylan Revisited: A glimpse of the great Welsh poet Dylan Thomas in his own words is portrayed by Douglas Rain, who recites some of Dylan's most noted Poems, such as Fern Hill, Poem in October, Poem on His Birthday, In the White Giant's Thigh, And Death Shall Have No Dominion. Also depicted are Dylan's various moods in successive years in his life; growing up in a Welsh town, emerging as a substantive author of verse and prose, success and fame in the public's eye, failing health and spirit, and his premature death after only 39 years. Also cast with Rain are Gillie Fenwick, Neil Culleton, and Paul Koslo.
156	25	"A Doll's House"	Paul Almond	Play by : Henrik Ibsen; Adapted by : Fletcher Markle	4 May 1966	
157	26	"Victor Borge"	Paddy Sampson	Rachmaninoff · Liszt · Sarasate · P. D. Q. Bach	11 May 1966	
Danish pianist and comedian Victor Borge stars in an hour of music and monologues, serious selections and statirical spoofs, in a concert with a 45-piece orchestra directed by Samuel Hersenhoren, videotaped with an invited audience at Toronto's O'Keefe Center which houses the largest soft-seat theatre in Canada. Serious musical selections include Borge playing the first movement, Vivace – Moderato (in F♯ minor), of Piano Concerto No. 1 by Sergei Rachmaninoff. Borge duets with his musical assistant, concert pianist Leonid Hambro. The Ensemble P. D. Q. Bach is featured, with Peter Schickele performing La campanella by Hungarian composer Franz Liszt. Double bass virtuoso Jack Pohr performs Zigeunerweisen (Gypsy Airs), Op. 20 by Pablo de Sarasate. A group of New York musicians perform the Cantata Iphigenia in Brooklyn, by P.D.Q. Bach. Notes: Produced by Paddy Sampson. Executive producer, Franz Kraemer. Billed by CBC as Part 1, the Victor Borge segment aired at 8:30 PM EST to accommodate a re-broadcast of Part 2: À tout prendre, a 1963 semi-autobiographical film produced, written, and directed by, and also starring, Claude Jutra, which was previously aired in season five on 14 April 1965.
158	27	"Duo: Glenn Gould, Yehudi Menuhin"	Unknown	Schoenberg · Bach · Beethoven	18 May 1966	
This hour is a program of music and conversation between two contemporary musicians of the concert stage, Canadian pianist Glenn Gould and American violinist Yehudi Menuhin. The compositions are scored for violin and piano (Bach's for harpsichord) and include, Phantasy, Op.47 by Arnold Schoenberg, first performed in Zürich in 1949, and published in 1952, Sonata No. 4 in C Minor, BWV 1017 by Johann Sebastian Bach, and Sontata No. 10 in G Major, Op. 96 by Ludwig van Beethoven. Notes: Franz Kraemer, executive producer. Eric Till, producer. Cec Johns, technical producer.
159	28	"Loving"	Unknown	Opera by : Murray Schafer	25 May 1966	
Please add a Plot Summary here, replacing this text. For guidance, see How to write a plot summary and the Television Plot Manual of Style.^{MOS:TVPLOT} Notes: Commissioned by Société Radio Canada, Loving was produced by Pierre Mercure (who died earlier that year in January) and first performed, in part, as Toi on CBC's French sister-network series L'Heure du concert (The Concert Hour) on 3 February 1966 with music direction by Serge Garant (conductor). Cast: Benoit Girard, Marilyn Lightstone, Carolyn Brown, Evelyn Maxwell, Huguette Tourangeau, Margo MacKinnon, Phyllis Mailing, and Yseult Mia Ropelle.
160	29	"Point and Counterpoint"	Unknown	Johann Sebastian Bach	1 June 1966	
In this concert hour, German conductor Hermann Scherchen is featured in his first CBC Television appearance. In addition to conducting, Scherchen is a violinist, recording artist, teacher, and noted interpreter of Gustav Mahler. Dr. Scherchen rehearses the CBC Toronto Chamber Orchestra in his own orchestration of The Art of Fugue, BWV 1080, by Johann Sebastian Bach (the North American debut of this version). Produced by Franz Kraemer.
161	30	"CBC Talent Festival (Massey Hall)"	Unknown	Unknown	8 June 1966	
For seven winters running, the Canadian Broadcasting Corporation has conducted a coast-to-coast talent search and competition for cash prices and career-advancing opportunities, including a spot on national radio and television for young Canadian musicians and singers to perform for audiences. In a one-hour concert at Massey Hall, Toronto, an orchestra conducted alternately by Sir Ernest MacMillan and John Avison, perform with four finalists of the seventh national competition. Recitals include appearances by Alban Gallant (clarinet), Judith Lebane (soprano), Kathryn Wunder (violin), and Henri Brassard (piano). Notes: Produced by Bill Bolt. Executive producer, Robert Allen.
162	31	"CBC Talent Festival (Place des Arts)"	Unknown	Mozart · Édouard Lalo · Puccini · Charpentier · Kent Kennan	15 June 1966	
Sir Wilfrid Pelletier conducts an orchestra at a one-hour concert held at the Place des Arts in Montreal, featuring finalists of the CBC Radio Talent Festival, broadcast in March: 19 year-old Calgary pianist Marilyn Engle performs the first movement of a Piano Concerto by Mozart.; 17 year-old Montreal flautist Robert Cram performs Mozart's Flute Concerto No. 2 in D Major, K. 314, iii. Rondo: Allegretto (final movement).; 16 year-old Montreal cellist Hélène Gagné performs the 1st movement, Prelude, lento – Allegro maestoso, of the Cello Concerto in D Minor by Édouard Lalo.; 24 year-old, Palestinian-born Canadian soprano Jeannette Zarou of Toronto sings selections by Giacomo Puccini, Mozart, and Charpentier.; Robert Cram performs Kent Kennan's Night Soliloquy for solo flute, piano and strings (1936).; Notes: Executive producer, Robert Allen. Producer, Peter Symcox.
163	32	"Concert: Soiree Musicale"	Unknown	Robert Schumann · Felix Mendelssohn	6 July 1966	
The season finale is a one-hour concert from Montreal. Spanish Love Songs by Robert Schumann are sung by soprano Pierrette Alarie, contralto Maureen Forrester, tenor Léopold Simoneau, and baritone John Boyden. With an orchestra conducted by Alexander Brott, American duo-pianists Arthur Gold and Robert Fizdale perform Concerto for Two Pianos and Orchestra in E major, composed in 1823 by 14 year-old Felix Mendelssohn. Notes: Pierre Mercure, Producer. Originally telecast on CBC's French network.

Previous: Season 5	List of Festival episodes	Succeeded by Season 7
