= Phyllis Mailing =

Canadian opera singer

- Born: November 4, 1929; Brantford, Ontario, Canada
- Died: November 26, 2004 (aged 75); Vancouver, British Columbia, Canada
- Genres: Classical
- Occupation(s): Musician, teacher
- Instrument: voice

Phyllis Margaret Mailing (November 4, 1929 – November 26, 2004) was a Canadian mezzo-soprano, teacher, and patron of classical music. She had a distinguished career as a singer, performing across North America and Europe.

== Early life ==
Phyllis Mailing was born on November 4, 1929, in Brantford, Ontario, and grew up in Hamilton.

== Education ==
Mailing began her musical education at the Hamilton Conservatory of Music, where she studied voice with Bertha Carey Morrow, and piano with Reginald Godden. While there, she won the gold medal for the highest marks in Canada within the Conservatory system.

From 1952 to 1957, Mailing attended the Royal Conservatory of Music of Toronto, where she studied with George Lambert, Weldon Kilburn, and Aksel Schiøtz. Following this, she continued her studies in Europe, first in Stuttgart, in 1959, then in Vienna to study with Giselle Rathanser, and finally in London, where she studied with Bruce Boyce.

== Career ==
While still a student at the Royal Conservatory, Mailing made her debut as a soloist in 1955, singing in J.S. Bach's St John Passion with the Toronto Mendelssohn Choir. Following this, she performed in small roles with the Canadian Opera Company, before leaving to study in Europe.

Upon her return to Canada, she settled first in Toronto to sing from 1961 to 1963, then relocated to St. John's, Newfoundland to open her own private studio, where she taught voice and the Orff method until 1965. During this time she was also a regular recital singer on CBC Radio Halifax.

In 1965 Mailing was a winner of the Concert Artists Guild competition, which provided her the opportunity to perform a recital in New York. This served as a catalyst for her international career, which brought her to recital halls all across North America, France, and even the USSR in 1971.

In addition to her performances of standard recital and operatic repertoire, Mailing became known as a specialist in contemporary classical music, in part due to her association with Canadian composer R. Murray Schafer. Mailing and Schafer were married on July 1 (Canada Day), 1960, in England. (They divorced in 1975). Many of Schafer's vocal works were written for, and premiered by Mailing, and include his Minnelieder (1965), Loving (1966), and Requiems for the Party Girl (1967), which she performed in 1972 with the New York Philharmonic, conducted by Bruno Maderna. The latter work, which was incorporated as part 2 of Schafer's Patria cycle, won the Fromm Foundation Prize in 1968. These performances significantly contributed to Mailing's reputation as an outstanding interpreter of contemporary music, and led to her involvement in the premieres of works by many Canadian composers, including István Anhalt, Jack Behrens, Jean Coulthard, Bruce Mather, Barbara Pentland, Harry Somers, Barry Truax, and Robert Turner, among others.

From 1965 to 1967 Mailing was Simon Fraser University's artist in residence, a position she held again from 1970 to 1975. After her residency at SFU, she began teaching at the Community Music School of Greater Vancouver in 1975. By 1980 she was a full-time instructor there, and in 1983 was appointed as head of the voice department.

In addition to her activities as a performer and teacher, Mailing was also a prominent and active member within the music community. She was a founding director and first president of the Vancouver New Music Society, and served on the board of the Canadian Music Center from 1979 to 1987.

=== Awards and honours ===
In 1977 Mailing was a recipient of the Canadian Music Council Medal for "outstanding service to music in Canada".

In 1978 she was awarded an FRHCM (honorary fellow's degree) from the Royal Hamilton College of Music.

== Death ==
On November 26, 2004, Phyllis Mailing died of cancer in Vancouver, British Columbia. She was predeceased by her husband of twenty five years, SFU professor Tom Mallinson.

== Discography ==
Canadian Composers Portraits: Barbara Pentland (album) ((performs on Pentland's "Sung Songs Nos. 4 and 5"))

- Released: 2003
- Format: CD
- Label: Centrediscs CMCCD9203

Canadian Composers Portraits: Istvan Anhalt (album) ((performs on Anhalt's "Foci"))

- Released: 2004
- Format: CD
- Label: Centrediscs CMCCD10204

Music and Musicians of Canada, Centennial Edition Vol. VI (album) ((performs on R. Murray Schafer's "Minnelieder"))

- Released: 1967
- Format: LP
- Label: CBC Radio Canada International 218/218-S / RCA Victor CC-1012/CCS-1012

Phyllis Mailing, mezzo-soprano (album) ((performs works by Manuel De Falla, R. Murray Schafer, and Mátyás Seiber))

- Released: 1971
- Format: LP
- Label: CBC Radio Canada SM 141
- Producer: Don Kowalchuck

Phyllis Mailing with the Purcell String Quartet (album) ((performs works by Ernest Chausson, Paul Hindemith, and Maurice Ravel))

- Released: 1973
- Format: LP
- Label: CBC Radio Canada SM 228
- Producer: George Laverock

Quatrains (album) ((performs works by Violet Archer, Jean Papineau-Couture, Barbara Pentland, and Frederick Schipizky))

- Released: 1984
- Format: LP
- Label: Centrediscs CMC 1083
- Producer: Anton Kwiatkowski

R. Murray Schafer: Requiems For The Party Girl / String Quartet No. 1 (album) ((performs on Schafer's "Requiems For The Party Girl"))

- Released: 1975
- Format: LP
- Label: Melbourne SMLP4026
