= Princess of the Stars =

Princess of the Stars may refer to:

- MV Princess of the Stars, a ferry owned by Filipino shipping company Sulpicio Lines that sank on June 22, 2008
- The Princess of the Stars, an experimental opera or music drama by R. Murray Schafer
- La Princesse des Étoiles (literally "The Princess of the Stars"), a French release title for Nausicaä of the Valley of the Wind.

== See also ==
- Star Princess
