= Jon Kimura Parker =

Jon Kimura Parker OC
- Born: December 25, 1959 (age 66); Vancouver, British Columbia, Canada
- Genres: Classical
- Occupation: Pianist
- Instrument: Piano
- Labels: Telarc, CBC
- Website: jonkimuraparker.com

Jon Kimura Parker OC (born 25 December 1959) is a Canadian pianist.

== Early life and education ==
Jon Kimura Parker was born in Vancouver, British Columbia, Canada, the son of Keiko Parker and John Parker. He began his studies with his uncle, Edward Parker, at the age of 4.

He appeared with the Vancouver Youth Orchestra when he was five. He studied with Lee Kum-Sing at the Vancouver Academy of Music and The University of British Columbia, Robin Wood at the Victoria Conservatory, Marek Jablonski at the Banff Centre, and Adele Marcus at the Juilliard School. He received an Honorary degree from The University of British Columbia in 2017.

== Career ==
Parker is the recipient of many international awards, and has won famous international competitions, including the prestigious Leeds International Pianoforte Competition in 1984 at the age of 24. Parker received the National Arts Centre Award in 1996, a companion award of the Governor General's Performing Arts Awards.

Parker has appeared as soloist with many of the world's leading orchestras, including the Bergen Philharmonic, the Berlin Radio Symphony, the Bournemouth Symphony, the Cleveland Orchestra, the London Symphony Orchestra, the Los Angeles Philharmonic, the National Symphony Orchestra, the New York Philharmonic, the Philadelphia Orchestra, the San Francisco Symphony, the Scottish National Orchestra, the Warsaw Philharmonic, the St Paul Chamber Orchestra, as well as every major Canadian orchestra. As guest soloist, Parker has toured the Pacific Rim with the Toronto Symphony Orchestra, Japan with the Vancouver Symphony Orchestra, Germany with the Royal Philharmonic, Western Canada with the National Arts Centre Orchestra and North America with the Hallé Orchestra.

Parker has performed for the US Supreme Court, Queen Elizabeth II, and Prime Ministers of Canada and Japan. He was made an Officer of the Order of Canada in 1999.

Parker once appeared on an episode of the Canadian children's TV puppet series Under the Umbrella Tree. He played himself, as well as playing the role of the piano teacher of the lead character Holly (the only lead human among a small cast of puppets). Near the end of the episode Parker performs a concert as part of the show, starting with Beethoven's Moonlight Sonata.

Parker has recorded works by Chopin, Tchaikovsky and Prokofiev. His recordings appear on CBC Records and the Telarc labels, among others.

He is Professor of Piano at The Shepherd School of Music, Rice University in Houston, Texas, and as of 2015, is part of the group "Off the Score", with Stewart Copeland, Yoon Kwon, Marlon Martinez and Judd Miller.

Parker's brother James Parker and cousin Ian Parker are also pianists. Together, they have recorded the Mozart piano concertos for 2 and 3 pianos for CBC Records.

=== Charity work ===
Parker is a member of the Canadian charity Artists Against Racism.
