= Joanna Burt =

Canadian opera singer

Joanna Burt is a Métis operatic singer of Anishinaabe descent from Ontario, Canada. She has sung both soprano and mezzo-soprano roles. In 2017, she became the first Indigenous singer in Canada cast in a principal role with the Canadian Opera Company, performing in Harry Sommer's opera Louis Riel in the role of Sara Riel, the sister of 19th-century Métis leader Louis Riel. At the time, she was enrolled in the Artist Diploma program at The Glenn Gould School at The Royal Conservatory of Music, and was active in Métis Nation of Ontario cultural performances. In 2018, she performed in a singing and speaking role in the original production of FIRST, a two-act piece using photos and imagery to tell the creation story of the Mississaugas.

Burt started singing at the age of five and joined the Kawartha Treble Troup at age nine. She has also sung with the St. Paul's Anglican Church Choir and the Kawartha Lakes Singers. At age 13, she was chosen to sing "O Canada" before the Canada Day fireworks at Wilson Fields in Lindsay, Ontario, after winning the 2006 Anthem Idol competition. She studied with Arlene Gray.

== Critical reception ==
In a review of Louis Riel, Opera Today said that the role of Sara was "well served by Joanna Burt's agreeable soprano", and together with Allyson McHardy was "especially fine as they urged Riel not to execute Thomas Scott". In a review of her 2017 performance at the Glenn Gould School Vocal Showcase, opera critic John Gelks wrote that Burt "has real potential as a dramatic soprano" with "some nice dark colours as well as weight".
