= Patricia Rideout-Rosenberg =

- Born: Patricia Irene Rideout; March 16, 1931; Saint John, New Brunswick, Canada
- Died: September 8, 2006 (aged 75); Cambridge, Ontario, Canada
- Education: Saint John High School
- Occupations: Contralto; Music educator
- Years active: 1947–1990
- Spouses: Rolf Dissmann (m. 1955; died 1975) Leonard Rosenberg (m. 1987; death 2006)

Patricia Irene Rideout-Rosenberg (March 16, 1931 – September 8, 2006) was a Canadian contralto and music educator. Born in Saint John, New Brunswick, she studied at the Royal Conservatory Opera School. Rideout-Rosenberg performed with the Banff School of Fine Arts, the Festival Singers of Canada, the Canadian Opera Company, the Toronto Mendelssohn Choir, the Toronto Symphony Orchestra and the New Brunswick Youth Orchestra. She presented multiple premieres of compositions across Canada and the world and appeared frequently on television and radio in Canada. Rideout-Rosenberg taught voice at Queen's University at Kingston and the University of Toronto.

== Early life and education ==
Rideout-Rosenberg was born on March 16, 1931, in Saint John, New Brunswick. She was the daughter of Eric Aubrey and Florence May Rideout (née Chase), and had six siblings. Rideout-Rosenberg attended Lorne Public School, Saint John from 1938 to 1940, then Victoria Public School between 1941 and 1945 and finally Saint John High School from 1946 to 1948. While at high school. she became interested in chorus work and dramatics, attended Little Theatre Guild, Saint John, and won multiple musical awards. She studied piano with Beatrice Price in Saint John from 1941 to 1943 and voice with Agnes Forbes from 1946 to 1948 in Saint John, and also performed in theatricals in the city. In 1949, Rideout-Rosenberg travelled to Toronto on a Royal Conservatory of Music scholarship in 1949 to pursue her musical studies and attended the Royal Conservatory Opera School (University of Toronto Opera Division) from 1952 to 1955. She studied under the teacher Ernesto Vinci in Toronto from 1949 to 1968.

== Career ==
She was a contralto, a mezzo-soprano, and played the roles of older woman. From 1947 to 1948, Rideout-Rosenberg was a student soloist at Saint John Theatre Guild. She was secretary of the Canadian Electrical Manufacturers and European Industrial Products and Disco, Toronto between 1950 and 1955. In 1950, Rideout-Rosenberg was a dancer and singer with the Red Barn Theatre in Jackson's Point, Ontario. She taught singing in 1954 at University Settlement, Toronto, and was a soloist in opera productions in 1954 and 1955 at the Banff School of Fine Arts. Rideout-Rosenberg was an original soloist with the Festival Singers of Canada, Toronto from 1956 to 1968, as well as being a guest soloist with major symphony orchestras and choral and orchestral societies. This included the Canadian Opera Company which whom she starred in some 20 operas starting from 1956, the Toronto Mendelssohn Choir in 1961 and again between 1965 and 1969, with the Toronto Symphony Orchestra, the New Brunswick Youth Orchestra, the Mount Allison Choral Society, and the Queen's Chamber Singers. She also appeared widely on CBC Television and Radio.

She performed all across Canada between 1954 and 1990. Rideout-Rosenberg had her first important operatic role as Madame Flora in a 1955 Royal Conservatory Opera School production of Gian Carlo Menotti's The Medium at Hart House Theatre and the role of Annina in an Opera Festival Association production of La traviata. She performed at the CNE Music Auditorium, at the St. Anne's Anglican Church, and at the Art Gallery of Toronto. In 1956, Rideout-Rosenberg made her recital debut at the Art Gallery of Toronto during the Opera Festival Association's annual winter season. That same year she appeared at the Stratford Festival as Bianca in the Canadian premiere of Benjamin Britten's The Rape of Lucretia. Rideout-Rosenberg performed as Mercedes in Carmen in 1956, the Sandman in Hansel and Gretel, the Lord Byron's Love Letter (Heure du concert) and Alto Rhapsody in 1957, Fidalma in Il matrimonio segreto and Le Roi David in 1958 and Maurya in the Canadian premiere of Ralph Vaughan Williams's Riders to the Sea with Teresa Stratas at the Hart House Theatre in April 1958, and on CBC Television in February 1962.

She performed at the Kingston Memorial Hall in early 1958. Rideout-Rosenberg sung Berta in The Barber of Seville for the Canadian Opera Company's tour between 1958 and 1959. She also sung Mrs. Sedley in Peter Grimes, Smeraldina in The Love for Three Oranges, and Mrs. Brown in the one-act opera Night Blooming Cereus, all of which occurred in 1959. In 1960, Rideout-Rosenberg sung Marcellina in The Marriage of Figaro, Maurya in Riders to the Sea, Messiah in Winnipeg, that she reprised in Toronto in 1961, 1966, 1974, 1975 and 1978 and in Hamilton in 1977. She also sung Suzuki, Cio-Cio-San's maid, in Madama Butterfly at the Vancouver International Festival in July 1960; she reprised the role more than any other, including in 1962 and 1971. Rideout-Rosenberg sung in Kindertotenlieder and Mama Lucia in Cavalleria rusticana in 1961, performed at the Canadian premiere of Arnold Schoenberg's Pierrot lunaire in 1962, Annina in Der Rosenkavalier in 1963, Sorceress in Dido and Aeneas and the Canadian television premiere of Glenn Gould's So You Want to Write a Fugue? that same year.

In 1964, she sung in Antonín Dvořák's Stabat Mater, Johann Sebastian Bach's Magnificat at the Stratford Festival; Ludwig van Beethoven's Symphony No. 9; Trois poèmes de Mallarmé and the Canadian radio premiere of John Beckwith's Jonah. Rideout-Rosenberg sung Vaughan Williams's Serenade to Music and Edward Elgar's Sea Pictures and Third Lady in The Magic Flute in 1965. She performed in Harry Somers's Five Songs for Dark Voice, Igor Stravinsky's Mass, Deirdre, Nurse in Eugene Onegin and the Canadian radio debut of Somers' Evocations in 1966. In 1967, Rideout-Rosenberg was Florence Pike in the Canadian premiere of Britten's Albert Herring in Stratford,, Kelsey Jones's Sam Slick, the Canadian premiere of Robert Turner's The Brideship, Julie Riel in Somers' Louis Riel as well as Evocations at Expo 67 in Montreal and Britten's Cantata academica. Works in 1968 include the Canadian premiere of Stravinsky's Requiem Canticles, Somers's The Fool, Tālivaldis Ķeniņš's Gloria in 1970, Bruce Mather's Madrigal III and Peter Maxwell Davies's Leopardi Fragment in 1971. She provided both the European (1972 in France) and American (Boston in 1976) premieres of Madrigal III and the European premiere of Somers's Evocations in 1972 as well as the Canadian premieres of Luciano Berio's El mar la mar and György Ligeti's Nouvelles Aventures in 1972.

Rideout-Rosenberg performed in the Canadian premiere of Norma Beecroft's Rasas II, R. Murray Schafer's Lustro and Charles Wilson's Héloise and Abelard in 1973 and again sung in Britten's The Rape of Lucretia at the 1974 Guelph Spring Festival. She telecast William Walton's Façade in 1975. In 1976, Rideout-Rosenberg performed in the Canadian international premieres of Harry Freedman's Fragments of Alice in Sweden and Þorkell Sigurbjörnsson's Solstice in Iceland and sang in George Crumb's Night of the Four Moons in Bergen, Bourges, Brussels, Geneva, Nantes, Saarbrücken, Stockholm and Toronto for New Music Concerts (NMC). That same year, she was in the Canadian premieres of Alcides Lanza's Kron'Kelz '75, Raymond Pannell's Push and Iannis Xenakis's N'Shima. For the NMC, Rideout-Rosenberg sung John Cage's Five Songs for Contralto and The Wonderful Widow of Eighteen Springs for Cage's birthday concert in Toronto in 1977. She also performed with Stuart Hamilton's Opera in Concert, in operas such as the role of Geneviève in Pelléas and Mélisande in both 1978 and 1988, Maurya in Riders to the Sea in 1981, the Grandmother in Manuel de Falla's La vida breve in 1981, and the Baroness in Samuel Barber's Vanessa in 1982 as well as the Canadian premiere of Mather's Un cri qui durerait la mer in 1988. She was also the Nurse in Boris Godunov, Mary in the Flying Dutchman, and Bach's Mass in B minor.

From 1980 to 1986, Rideout-Rosenberg taught voice at the music department of the Queen's University at Kingston as well as University of Toronto from 1980 to 1989. Her students included the likes of the mezzo-soprano Laura Pudwell. Rideout-Rosenberg's services as an adjudicator and competition juror were frequently asked for. She worked for such competitions held in New Brunswick, Newfoundland, and Ontario, and for the Eckhardt-Gramatté Competition, the final examinations in voice at the Conservatoire de musique du Québec à Montréal, the Conservatoire de musique du Québec à Québec, and juries for the Ontario Arts Council and the Canada Council. Rideout-Rosenberg retired from performing in 1991 and moved to Cambridge, Ontario. She liaised with the seniors of the David Durward Centre (of which she was secretary of the operating board) and the Cambridge Arts Guild to raise funds for the establishment of the Cambridge Centre for the Arts. Rideout-Rosenberg was secretary of the board of the Guelph-based Edward Johnson Music Foundation, and a member of the ACTRA: AEA's executive committee from 1959 to 1965.

== Personal life and death ==
She was a unitarian. She was married to Rolf Edmund Dissmann from September 3, 1955, until his death on October 4, 1975. She remarried in 1987 to the chartered accountant Leonard Rosenberg and changed her name to Patricia Rideout-Rosenberg. She was stepmother to his two children. Rideout-Rosenberg died of ovarian cancer in Cambridge, Ontario on September 8, 2006. A celebration of her life took place at Glenn Gould Studio, Toronto on September 30, 2006.
