= Chorus Anyone =

1964 Canadian music television series

- Genre: Music
- Written by: Eric Nicol
- Presented by: Edward Greenhalgh
- Country of origin: Canada
- Original language: English
- No. of seasons: 1

Production
- Production location: Vancouver

Original release
- Network: CBC Television
- Release: 28 June – 13 September 1964

Related
- Chorus Gentlemen

Chorus Anyone is a Canadian music television program that aired on CBC Television in 1964.

== Premise ==
This Vancouver-produced series was hosted by Edward Greenhalgh and regularly featured a 12-member men's choir directed by John Avison. Avison also appeared on the series with Hugh McLean to perform piano duets. Each episode featured a particular theme on which the songs were based such as the sea or campfire music. Guest vocalists during the series run included Jan Rubeš.

== Scheduling ==
This half-hour series was broadcast on Sundays at 7:30 p.m. (Eastern) from 28 June to 13 September 1964.
