= The Concert Hour =

Canadian classical music television series

- Genre: Classical music
- Directed by: Irving Gutman
- Country of origin: Canada
- Original languages: English; French
- No. of seasons: 4

Production
- Producers: Noel Gauvin; Pierre Mercure; Pierre Morin
- Production location: Montreal
- Running time: 60 minutes

Original release
- Network: CBC Television; Radio-Canada
- Release: 6 May 1954 – 11 March 1958

The Concert Hour ((in French) L'Heure du concert) is a Canadian classical music television series that aired on CBC Television in English and Radio-Canada in French from 1954 to 1958.

== Premise ==
This was initially a local series on Montreal's CBFT airing on alternate weeks with Teletheatre until it was given a dual-network run from May 1954. Episodes were then broadcast weekly on both the English and French CBC networks with announcements in both languages.

Guest musicians included Glenn Gould, Louis Quilico, Robert Savoie and Rosalyn Tureck.

Classical music selections were supplemented by ballet, contemporary music and opera performances.

The series included ballet performances with choreographers such as David Adams, Ludmilla Chiriaeff, Heino Heiden, Brian Macdonald.

Orchestras were led by conductors such as Jean Deslauriers, Roland Leduc, Boyd Neel and Wilfrid Pelletier.

== Reception ==
This cultural series had limited appeal, especially in areas such as Winnipeg where CBC held a monopoly of television signals. Many viewers switched off their televisions during broadcasts of The Concert Hour.

== Scheduling ==
This hour-long series was broadcast as follows:

Day	Time	Season run	
Thursday	8:30 p.m.	6 May 1954	24 Jun 1954
Thursday	10:00 p.m.	29 Sep 1955	22 Mar 1956
Thursday	10:00 p.m.	4 Oct 1956	21 Mar 1957
Tuesday	10:00 p.m.	24 Sep 1957	11 Mar 1958
