= Garnet Brooks =

Canadian opera singer

- Born: September 4, 1936; London, Ontario
- Died: July 21, 2009 (aged 72) Regina, Saskatchewan
- Genres: Classical
- Occupation: Singer

Garnet Brooks (September 4, 1936 – July 21, 2009) was a Canadian tenor and vocal pedagogue who performed with opera companies and orchestras across North America and Europe.

== Early life and education ==
Garnet Brooks was born September 4, 1937, in London, Ontario, to parents James (an auto mechanic) and Sylvia Brooks. As a teenager, while working at his father's gas station, Brooks studied music privately. After two years he received a scholarship to attend The Royal Conservatory of Music (RCM) in Toronto from 1960-1964, where his teachers included Mary Raze, Dorothy Allan Park, John Coveart, and Douglas Bodle. In 1965 Brooks furthered his voice studies under the tutelage of Robert Weede at the Merola Opera Program in San Francisco.

== Professional career ==
=== Performing ===
While still a student at the RCM, Brooks sang professionally. Early performances included roles with the Stratford Festival (in Mozart's The Marriage of Figaro), and the Canadian Opera Company (including his 1963 debut in Richard Strauss' Der Rosenkavalier). After an appearance with the Toronto Symphony Orchestra in 1963, critics called Brooks "the greatest tenor Canada has produced since Jon Vickers".

In 1967, Brooks received a Canada Council grant to travel to Europe to audition for various opera houses. In 1968 he joined the Glyndebourne Touring Company, and during the 1968-1969 season also toured with the Western Opera Theater (affiliated with the San Francisco Opera). Brooks would remain in Europe until 1982. From 1974-1976 he lived in Switzerland, performing at the Stadttheater Bern, following which he moved to Vienna in 1976 to perform with the Salzburg Opera Company. During these years he continued to sing with the Glyndebourne Opera, and at various opera houses in West Germany.

While based in Europe, Brooks continued to perform regularly with the Canadian Opera Company and make guest appearances with other North American companies. Besides his performances in the standard operatic repertoire, Brooks was involved in the world premieres of operas by Canadian composers Derek Healey (Seabird Island), Harry Somers (Louis Riel) and Charles Wilson (Heloise and Abelard and The Summoning of Everyman). In 1969 he sang the title role in the North American premiere of Benjamin Britten's The Prodigal Son at the Guelph Spring Festival, conducted by Nicholas Goldschmidt.

In addition to his career as an opera singer, Brooks performed in solo recitals, oratorios, TV programs, and in concert with every major Canadian symphony orchestra. He continued to perform into the early 2000s.

=== Teaching ===
When Brooks returned to live in Canada in 1982 he taught voice at the University of Western Ontario in London, his hometown. During this time his teaching was featured in The Next Thing You Hear, a television documentary about singing. The following year, Brooks relocated to Regina, Saskatchewan, where he joined the faculty as head of the voice department at the University of Regina Conservatory of Music. Following his retirement in 2003, Brooks continued to teach privately.

== Personal life and honours ==
Brooks married his second wife, Paulette (who he married in 1998) and had at least two children and four grandchildren. He died in Regina on July 21, 2009, predeceased by his parents and his first wife, Delores. In 2019 he was posthumously inducted by the Forest City London Music Awards into the London Music Hall of Fame (in London, Ontario).
