= Vancouver Academy of Music =

Canadian music conservatory

Coordinates: 49.2747°N 123.1444°W

The Vancouver Academy of Music (VAM) is a Canadian music conservatory located in Vancouver, British Columbia. The school was founded as the Community Music School of Greater Vancouver in 1969 through efforts made by the Vancouver Community Arts Council. The school was originally located on West 12th Ave but relocated to the Music Centre in Vanier Park in May 1976. The school officially changed its name to the Vancouver Academy of Music in 1979. The VAM currently has two divisions of study, a college division for students wanting to pursue a performance career and a preparatory division for school-age children and adults.

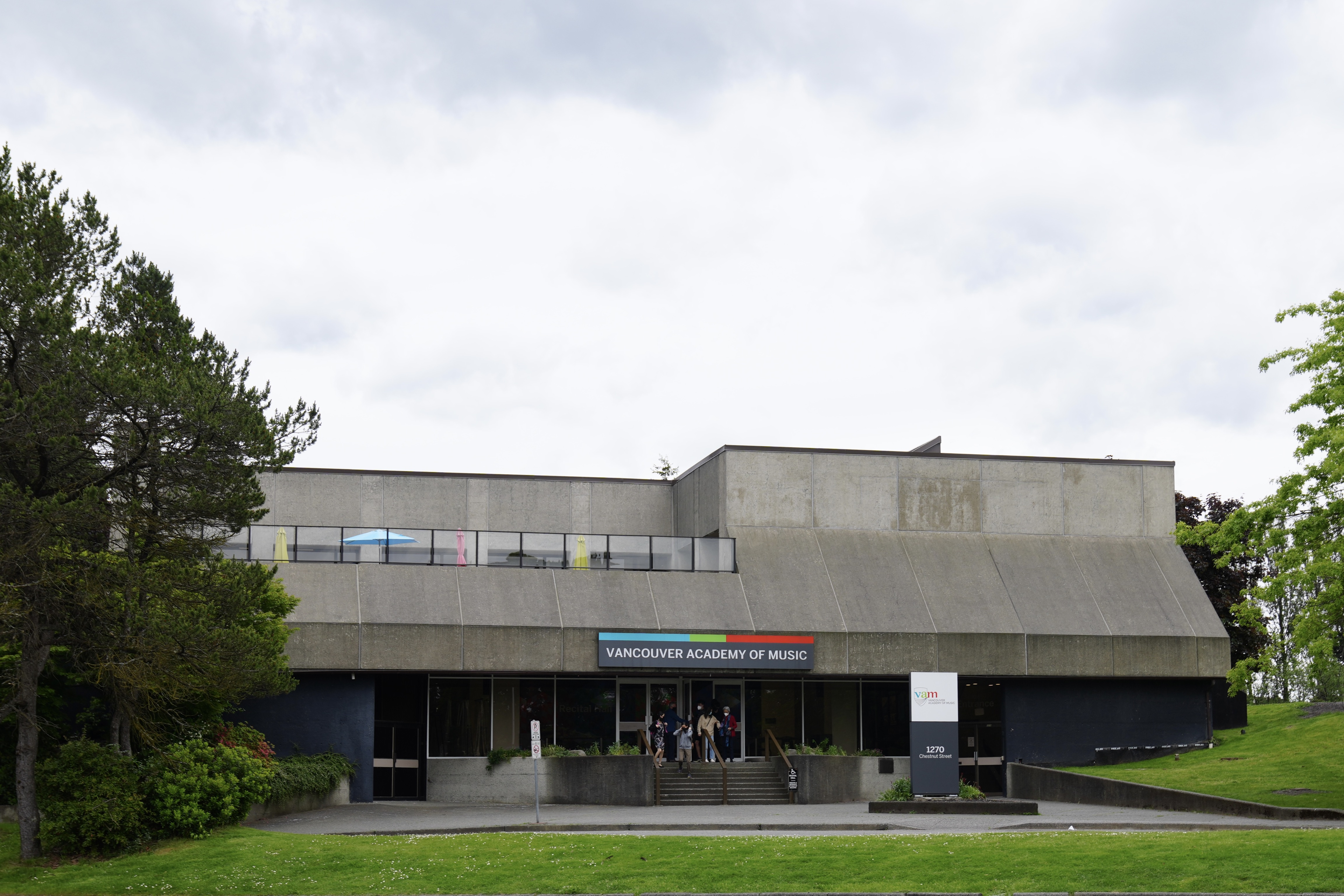
Vancouver Academy of Music

== History ==
When the VAM was initially founded, it only offered classes for young children in the Orff, Suzuki, and Kodály methods. In 1971 trumpeter Jerold Gerbrecht (longtime principal trumpet of the Vancouver Symphony Orchestra) was brought in as music director to expand the school to include adult classes in music theory, history, composition, dance, and private instrumental and voice instruction. The school also formed an orchestra and a choir, but at this time still did not grant degrees.

The Academy's program offerings continued to expand throughout the 1970s and 1980s with master classes, opera workshops, and other specialized courses. This success led the school to establish a collegiate program, the S. K. Lee College Program, in 1987 in partnership with Thompson Rivers University and the British Columbia Open University (BCOU). Students attend non-music classes at TRU and have their music courses at the Academy. Bachelor of Music degrees are awarded through the BCOU.

== Orchestras ==
The Academy has Junior, Intermediate, and Senior Symphony Orchestras. Three times a year, the Senior Academy Strings joins forces with the wind department to form the Academy Symphony Orchestra to perform at the Vancouver Orpheum Theatre. Notable conductors include the late Sidney Harth.

== Notable faculty (past and present) ==
- Robert Creech, French horn
- Kum-Sing Lee, Piano
- Phyllis Mailing, Voice
- Steven Staryk, Violin
- Gwen Thompson, Violin
- Robert Rozek, Violin

== Notable alumni ==
- Lisle Ellis, composer
- Chan-hon Goh, ballet dancer
- Erin Wall, operatic soprano
- Jon Kimura Parker, pianist

== See also ==
- Category:Academic staff of the Vancouver Academy of Music
