= Louis Riel (opera) =

Opera by Harry Somers

- Opera by Harry Somers
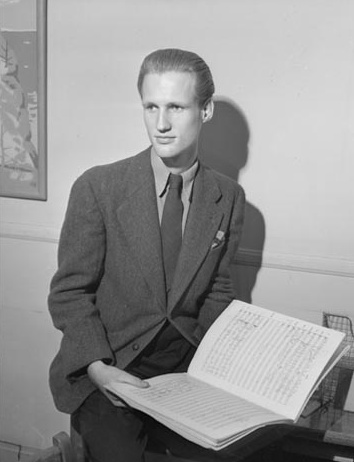
- The composer in 1947
- Librettist: Mavor Moore; Jacques Languirand
- Language: English; French
- Premiere: September 23, 1967; O'Keefe Centre, Toronto

Louis Riel is a three-act opera by composer Harry Somers to an English and French libretto by Mavor Moore and Jacques Languirand. Written for the 1967 Canadian Centennial and arguably that country's most famous opera to date, it portrays the titular Métis leader executed in 1885.

== Performance history ==
Louis Riel was first performed in Toronto on 23 September 1967 at the O'Keefe Centre. Its initial run was directed by Leon Major and starred Bernard Turgeon, Cornelius Opthof, Joseph Rouleau, Patricia Rideout, Mary Morrison, Roxolana Roslak, Howell Glynne, and Remo Marinucci. Further performances were staged in Montreal at the Place des Arts in October of that year.

The libretto depicts the post-Confederation political events bounded by the Indigenous and Métis uprisings of 1869–70 (Red River Rebellion) and 1884–5 (North-West Rebellion) and the personal tragedy of the leader of the uprisings, the Manitoba schoolteacher and Métis hero Louis Riel. After the premiere, Kenneth Winters described the opera in the Toronto Telegram (25 September 1967) as a 'pastiche ... big, efficient, exciting, heterogeneous ... It had no ring of eternity but it was a vigorous harnessing of current and choice; a brash, smart, cool hand on the pulse of a number of fashions, social, dramatic and musical.' In 1968 additional performances were staged in Toronto. Franz Kraemer produced an adaptation of the opera in 1969 for CBC TV.

A revival was staged by the Canadian Opera Company in Toronto, Ottawa, and Washington, D.C., in 1975. Wendell Margrave of the Washington Star described the opera as 'one of the most imaginative and powerful scores to have been written in this century.' Using a broadcast tape from the 1975 US performance, Centrediscs produced a three-record set of the opera.

Louis Riel was next staged at the Place des Arts in January 2005 by Opera McGill to celebrate the centenary of McGill University's music program. The opera was also staged in Vancouver in 2010.

To coincide with the 150th anniversary of the confederation of Canada, the Canadian, a production of Louis Riel by the Canadian Opera Company and the National Arts Centre was performed from April 20 to May 13, 2017 at the Toronto Four Seasons Centre, and is scheduled for June 20 to June 27 at the Ottawa National Arts Centre. Directed by Peter Hinton-Davis, this revival was the first COC opera to cast indigenous artists for indigenous roles. The production features Michif, the Métis language, not included in the original production, and split the opera chorus in two- the Parliamentary chorus, representing western settlers, and the Land Assembly Chorus, representing indigenous people directly affected by the victories and losses of Riel.

The 2017 cast included Russell Braun as Riel, James Westman as John A. Macdonald, Alain Coulombe as Monseigneur Taché, Allyson McHardy as Riel's mother, Joanna Burt as Sara Riel, Simone Osbourne as Riel's wife, Doug MacNaughton as William McDougall, and Taras Chmil as Baptiste Lépine.

In 2019, the COC and National Arts Centre commissioned music to replace the Kuyas aria at the beginning of the third act. This aria was based on a Nisg̱a’a lament that had been used in contravention of Nisg̱a’a law. Ian Cusson composed new music set to Moore’s previously unused original text for the scene.

== Roles ==
Roles at the 1967 premiere were:

Role	Singer
William McDougall	Howell Glynne
A Soldier	George Reinke
Ambroise Lépine	André Lortie
Thomas Scott	Thomas Park
Joseph Delorme	Jacques Lareau
Janvier Ritchot	David Geary
Elzéar Goulet	Lloyd Dean
André Nault	Phil Stark
Baptiste Lépine	Ermanno Mauro
Elzéar Lagimodière	Donald Rutherford
Louis Riel	Bernard Turgeon
Dr. Schultz	Peter Milne
Charles Mair	Donald Saunders
O’Donaghue	John Arab
Bishop Taché	Joseph Rouleau
John A. Macdonald	Cornelis Opthof
George-Étienne Cartier	Perry Price
Donald Smith	Ernest Atkinson
Julie Riel	Patricia Rideout
Sara Riel	Mary Morrison
Colonel Garnet Wolseley	Maurice Brown
Hudson’s Bay Scout	Robert Jeffrey
Marguerite Riel	Roxolana Roslak
Gabriel Dumont	Garnet Brooks
James Isbister	Lloyd Dean
Poundmaker	Oskar Raulfs
Gen. Frederick Middleton	Ernest Atkinson
Father André	André Lortie
Wandering Spirit	Herman Rombouts
Clerk of the Court	Donald Saunders
Judge	Maurice Brown
F.X. Lemieux	John Arab
B. B. Osier	David Geary
Dr. François Roy	Robert Jeffrey
Prison Guard	George Reinke
