= Howell Glynne =

Welsh opera singer (1906–1969)

Howell Glynne (24 January 1906 – 24 November 1969) was an operatic bass. He was born in Britain but lived the latter years of his life in Canada, and taught singing at the University of Toronto.

== Biography ==
He was born in Britain as Howell Glynne Jones in 1906, in Swansea, South Wales. He studied under Ben Davies and Reinhold von Warlich.

He joined the chorus of the Carl Rosa Opera in the late 1920s, and made his solo operatic debut for the company in 1931, as Sparafucile in Rigoletto; after the war years he had two spells as a principal bass for Sadler's Wells Opera (1946–51 and 1956–64), playing many of the standard roles of the operatic repertoire. One of his most significant appearances there, was as Fiesco in the first production in England of Simon Boccanegra, with Arnold Matters in the title role.

From the 1950s he appeared at Covent Garden, London, and other venues in a wide variety of operas including Boris Godunov, Fidelio, The Bohemian Girl, Der Rosenkavalier, Le coq d'or, Aida, The Midsummer Marriage, Die Fledermaus and La Cenerentola. In 1962 he sang Pooh-Bah in a radio broadcast of The Mikado.

He created the roles of Ford in the first professional performance of Ralph Vaughan Williams’ Sir John in Love (April 1946), Joseph Lavatte in Sir Arthur Bliss's opera The Olympians (1949), and in Canada, the Hon William McDougall in Harry Somers’ opera Louis Riel (1967). He appeared as the Ghost in the first performance in English of Humphrey Searle's opera Hamlet, in Toronto in February 1969.

His students included Stafford Dean. His recordings include excerpts from Simon Boccanegra, Merrie England, The Merry Widow, and a complete Tosca (as the Sacristan, to Renata Tebaldi's Tosca).

His first wife was Lena Williams, with whom he had two children, Enid Mair Jones (born 12/24/1927) and Barbara Jean Jones (born 4/18/30). His second wife was Frieda Irons, a model. Frieda had one son by a former marriage, Michael, who legally changed his name to Michael Glynne, but was not formally adopted by Howell Glynne. He died in a car accident in Toronto on 24 November 1969.

The Royal Conservatory of Music (Canada) endows a Howell Glynne Operatic Scholarship.
