= Georgia Sea Island Singers =

American folk music ensemble

The Georgia Sea Island Singers are an American folk music ensemble from Georgia, United States. Formed in the early 1900s, the group is formed of African Americans who travel performing songs and other elements of the Gullah culture. The group's members change with time, and have included Bessie Jones, Joe Armstrong, Mable Hillery and Frankie Sullivan Quimby (a current member of the collective).

The group's music was recorded in 1935 when they were known as the "Spiritual Singers Society" and again in 1959–1960 by Alan Lomax. A Newport Folk Festival performance was featured in the 1967 film Festival, and they performed at the inauguration of President Jimmy Carter.

== See also ==
- Sea Island, Georgia
