= Ian Parker (Canadian pianist) =

- Born: January 11, 1978 (age 48); Vancouver, British Columbia, Canada
- Genre: Classical
- Occupation: Pianist
- Instrument: Piano
- Website: ianparker.ca

Ian Parker (born January 11, 1978) is a Canadian classical pianist.

== Biography ==
Ian Parker was born in Vancouver, British Columbia, the son of Eileen Parker and Edward Parker. His cousins James Parker and Jon Kimura Parker are also pianists.

His father, Edward, a highly respected piano teacher in Vancouver, taught all three pianists including Ian, beginning at the age of three. He later studied at The Juilliard School under Veda Kaplinsky, where he received a Bachelor and Master of Music degree, as well as an Artist Diploma.

== Career ==
He was the First Prize winner at the 2001 CBC National Radio Competition, Mr. Parker has also won the Grand Prize at the Canadian National Music Festival, the Corpus Christie International Competition and the Montreal Symphony Orchestra Competition. At The Juilliard School, he received the 2002 William Petschek Piano Debut Award and, on two occasions, was the winner of the Gina Bachauer Piano Scholarship Competition. Heard regularly on CBC Radio, he has also performed live on WQXR (hosted by Robert Sherman) in New York.

He has appeared as soloist with major orchestras internationally, including the Cleveland Orchestra, Cincinnati Symphony, National Symphony, San Francisco Symphony, Hong Kong Sinfonietta, Minas Gerais Philharmonic Orchestra, Honolulu Symphony, as well as many other major Canadian Orchestras.

He has recorded the works of Ravel, Stravinsky and Gershwin with the London Symphony Orchestra as well as an all-Fantasie CD entitled Moonlight Fantasies. His recordings appear on CBC Records and the Azica and ATMA Classique labels.
