= Robert Creech =

Canadian musician (1928–2019)

Robert Edward Creech (26 September 1928 – 20 December 2019) was a Canadian french hornist, music educator, and arts administrator. He served as director of the Canadian Music Council from 1975 until 1979 and chairman of the Arts Advisory Council of the Canada Council from 1976 until 1978. In 1991, he was appointed the chief executive of the Royal Liverpool Philharmonic Society.

Creech was principal french horn with numerous orchestras during his career, including the Victoria Symphony (1944–1946), the Winnipeg Symphony Orchestra (1949–1952), the Vancouver Symphony Orchestra (1946–1948 and 1958–1974), the CBC Vancouver Chamber Orchestra (1958–1976), and the Stratford Festival Orchestra (1964–1969). He also played with the Toronto Symphony Orchestra (1952–1955) and the CBC Symphony Orchestra (1955–1958). An active chamber musician, he notably performed and recorded with the Vancouver Woodwind Quintet from 1968 until 1976 and made recordings with the Baroque Strings and the Purcell String Quartet.

Born in Victoria, British Columbia, Creech attended the University of British Columbia (UBC) and the University of Manitoba where he was an undergraduate and graduate student majoring in history and English. He was subsequently offered admission to the Curtis Institute of Music in Philadelphia and studied french horn over a period of six years with Mason Jones, principal horn with the Philadelphia Orchestra. From 1959 until 1976, he taught on the music faculty of the University of British Columbia and from 1970 until 1985 he was artistic and executive director of the Courtenay Youth Music Centre. During the 1960s, he was highly involved with the Vancouver Community Arts Council and was instrumental in helping establish the Vancouver Academy of Music where he occasionally taught classes. In 1973, he founded the music department at Vancouver Community College, serving as its director through 1976. He was a full professor at the University of Western Ontario from 1976 until 1989 and served as the vice-principal of The Royal Conservatory of Music from 1987 until 1991.

Creech moved to Ireland in 1994 where he managed an international arts consultancy (Arts Services Partnership), which has prepared a number of extensive reports for the Canadian and British Columbia governments. He was involved, as a volunteer, in music and arts projects in Ireland, including Summer Music on the Shannon/Summer Music in Galway.

He died on 20 December 2019 at the age of 91.
