= Chorus Gentlemen =

Canadian music television series

- Genre: Music
- Directed by: Ken Gibson
- Presented by: David Glyn-Jones
- Country of origin: Canada
- Original language: English
- No. of seasons: 2

Production
- Producer: Neil Sutherland
- Running time: 30 minutes

Original release
- Network: CBC Television
- Release: 4 July 1965 – 30 April 1967

Related
- Chorus Anyone

Chorus Gentlemen is a Canadian music television program that aired on CBC Television from 1965 to 1967.

== Premise ==
This series was hosted by David Glyn-Jones. Like Chorus Anyone in 1964, it was produced in Vancouver and regularly featured a men's choir, although the choir was now directed by Bobby Reid in the initial 1965 episodes, then by Brian Gibson for the remainder of the series run. Initially, episodes featured popular songs from the 1930s and 1940s, a scope later expanded to include selections from the 1890s to the 1960s. Ralph Grierson (piano) and Bud Henderson (bandleader) were among the series regulars who were joined by various guests.

== Scheduling ==
This half-hour series was broadcast from 1965 to 1967 as follows (times are Eastern):

Day	Time	Season run
Sundays	6:30 p.m.	4 July to 5 September 1965
Fridays	8:00 p.m.	24 June to 29 July 1966
Sundays	2:00 p.m.	8 January to 9 April 1967
Sundays	2:30 p.m.	16 to 30 April 1967
