= Silent Night, Lonely Night =

1969 film television

- Based on: Silent Night, Lonely Night by Robert Anderson
- Teleplay by: John Vlahos
- Directed by: Daniel Petrie
- Starring: Lloyd Bridges; Shirley Jones
- Theme music composer: Billy Goldenberg
- Country of origin: United States
- Original language: English

Production
- Producer: Jack Farren
- Cinematography: Jack A. Martha (as Jack Martha)
- Editor: Buddy Small
- Running time: 98 minutes
- Production company: Universal Television

Original release
- Network: NBC
- Release: December 16, 1969

Silent Night, Lonely Night is a 1969 American made-for-television drama romance film directed by Daniel Petrie and starring Lloyd Bridges and Shirley Jones.

== Plot ==
A man and a woman meet at a New England inn one Christmas and begin an affair.

== Cast ==
- Lloyd Bridges as John Sparrow
- Shirley Jones as Katherine Johnson
- Carrie Snodgress as Janet
- Robert Lipton as Philip
- Lynn Carlin as Jennifer Sparrow
- Cloris Leachman as Ginny
- Richard Eastham as Paul Johnson
- Stefan Arngrim as Jerry Johnson
- Nydia Westman as Mae
- Woodrow Parfrey as Dr. Hyatt
- Edward R. Leadbetter as Mac
- Walter Boughton as Desk Clerk
- Amzie Strickland as Saleswoman
- Marjie Short as Young Ginny (as Marjorie Anne Short)
- Jeff Bridges as Young John (as Jeffrey Bridges)

== Adaptations ==
In 1965, Silent Night, Lonely Night was adapted for the Canadian CBC Television anthology series Festival for a December 1 episode of the same name. It was directed by Eric Till, starring Frances Hyland as Katherine, and Paul Harding as John, with Michael Sarrazin, Sabina von Fircks, Cosette Lee, and Tom Beckerman.
