= Vancouver Woodwind Quintet =

The Vancouver Woodwind Quintet (VWQ) was a Canadian wind quintet based in Vancouver, British Columbia that was active during the late 1960s and 1970s. The quintet performed roughly 40 concerts a year, both in Vancouver and on tour throughout Canada. Many of their concerts were given in Vancouver schools through the sponsorship of the Vancouver School Board. The ensemble also performed with some frequency on CBC Radio. The group performed a broad repertoire and notably recorded works by several contemporary Canadian composers, including Ingolf Dahl, Carl Nielsen, and Robert Turner.

Founded in 1968, the VWQ was made up of members of the Vancouver Symphony Orchestra and often performed in joint programs with the orchestra. From 1968 to 1970 the Jeunesses musicales du Canada sponsored the group. After 1975 the ensemble no longer toured and the quintet disbanded in the late 1970s. The original members of the ensemble included Robert Creech (horn), Harriet Crossland (flute), Ronald de Kant (clarinet), Roland Small (bassoon), and Warren Stannard (oboe). Creech was the only member to leave the ensemble and he was succeeded by Martin Hackleman in 1976.
