= Pierre Mercure =

Canadian musician and producer (1927–1966)

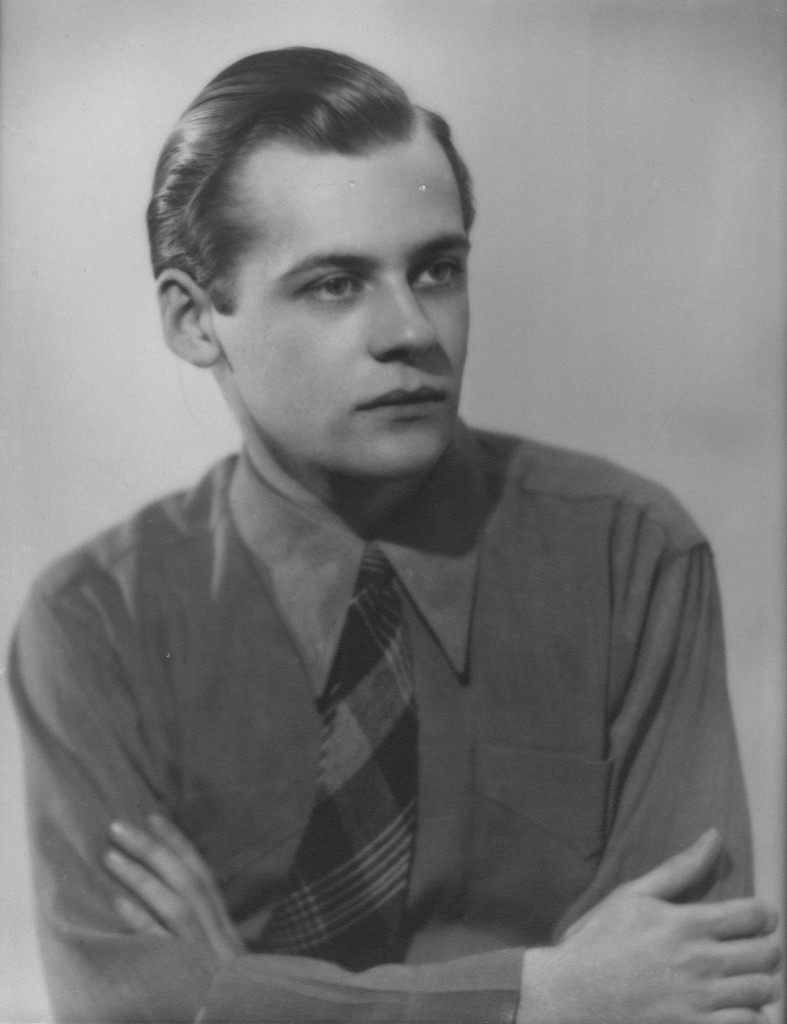
Pierre Mercure

Pierre Mercure (21 February 1927 – 29 January 1966) was a Canadian composer, TV producer, bassoonist, and administrator.

Mercure was born in Montreal. As a student at the Conservatoire de musique du Québec à Montréal, he earned honours including Premier prix Harmony, Counterpoint, and Deuxième prix bassoon in 1949. His primary composition teacher was Claude Champagne. He also studied composition briefly with Nadia Boulanger in Paris and Luigi Dallapiccola at Tanglewood.

Mercure began his composing career in the world of ballet, composing four ballets in a short period in 1948 and 1950, and going on to compose orchestral, chamber and electronic music as well. He sought to help the Canadian new music community progress to the level of their counterparts in European and American classical music, taking many trips to France to immerse himself in new music there. He died in a road traffic accident near Avallon, France, aged 38.

He was married to actress Monique Mercure from 1949 to 1958.

== Works ==
Ballet

- Dualité (1948)
- La Femme archaïque (1949)
- Lucrèce Borgia (1949)
- Emprise (1950)
- Improvisation (1961)
- Incandescence (1961)
- Structures métalliques I and II (1961)
- Tétrachromie (1963)
- Manipulations (1964)
- Surimpressions (1964)

Film

- Walls of Memory (Mémoire en fête) - 1964
- La Forme des choses (1965)
- Élément 3 (1965)

Orchestral

- Kaléidoscope (1948)
- Ils ont détruit la ville (1950)
- Cantate pour une joie (1955)
- Divertissement (1957)
- Triptyque (1959)
- Lignes et points (1964)

Chamber

- Pantomime (1948)
- H2O per Severino (1965)

Electronic

- Jeu de hockey (1961)
- Répercussions (1961)
- Structures métalliques III (1962)
- Psaume pour abri (1963)
