= Patria (theatre) =

Patria is a cycle of music-theatre works written over a period of 40 years by R. Murray Schafer. The title derives from the Latin word for "homeland". The cycle is framed by a prologue The Princess of the Stars and an epilogue And Wolf Shall Inherit the Moon, and includes ten other major works. All twelve of the works place heavy emphasis on the location of performance. The third production in the series, Patria 3: The Greatest Show, was adapted into the film Carnival of Shadows. The cycle is in a continual state of evolution as participants of And Wolf Shall Inherit the Moon return to perform the work each summer, revising the content of the performance to accommodate the current environment of the site and needs of the performance community.

== History ==
In 1966, Schafer originally conceived of Patria as a bipartite work, where the two halves would be performed simultaneously on separate stages. Instead, the two halves became Patria 1 and 2. By 1979, Schafer began to think of Patria as a cycle of six works. By 1990, the cycle settled into its current form of a dozen works.

== Parts ==
Patria — The Prologue, The Princess of the Stars
Captured by Three-Horned Enemy, the Princess sings an aria across a lake before a sunrise ritual. The audience sits on the shore while the ritual is performed on the lake in canoes. Wolf, who represents the id, leaves the lake to search for the Princess, hoping she will redeem him with her compassion. Only then can he rise to the heavens and inherit the moon. The Princess will return to the heavens as well. Wolf's search will take him through many identities and many generations. The Princess will become the human Ariadne.

Patria 1 — Wolfman
Wolf's first incarnation is as a refugee, who is unable to integrate into his new country. He locates Ariadne at a party, but he is unable to meet her. He stabs himself in the stomach with a knife over this heartbreak.

Patria I was premiered as a co-production of the COC and the Shaw Festival.

Patria 2 — Requiems for the Party Girl
The Star Princess has incarnated as Ariadne in her first transformation on Earth. She is committed in a mental asylum with no exits. The doctors are completely unable to treat her. Ariadne searches for an exit, and she is the only patient to do so.

Patria 3 — The Greatest Show
The music of Patria 1 and 2 is pulverized and performed at an outdoors carnival at night throughout various tents and booths. The fairgrounds are destroyed at the conclusion.

Patria 4 — The Black Theatre of Hermes Trismegistos
In a deserted mine or factory at midnight, Hermes Trismegistos (the thrice great) guides the work of medieval alchemists who are gathered around a crucible. They attempt to transmute gold (King and Queen) and silver (Sun and Moon).

Patria 5 — The Crown of Ariadne
A dance drama set in ancient Crete is the setting for a staging of the myth of Theseus, Ariadne and the Minotaur.

Patria 6 — Ra
An audience of 75 are dressed as initiates and lead into the underworld by Anubis (Wolf), who guides them through an 11-hour sacred drama which dramatizes the death and rebirth of Ra. Before dawn, the Ra is reborn and ascends to the Hall of the Double Maat. On the scales of Maat, the King's heart is weighed against the feather of truth. Ra and the King rise into the dawn sky, and the initiates are led out after them.

Patria 7 — Asterion
This section is set in the heart of the labyrinth, where the audience meets the Minotaur.

Patria 8 — The Palace of the Cinnabar Phoenix
Wolf seeks enlightenment in the East.

Patria 9 — The Enchanted Forest
Outdoors on a summer evening, the audience searches for a missing child (Ariadne). They encounter a villain who has transformed Ariadne into a birch tree as a lure for Wolf. Earth Mother instructs the audience to respect the tree.

Patria 10 — The Spirit Garden
Ariadne is worshipped as a corn goddess by sowers who are cultivating a garden.

Patria — The Epilogue
And Wolf Shall Inherit the Moon
For a week in the forest, participants camp at sites separated from each other by large distances. The groups learn their clan rituals throughout the week, and on the final day, they perform a ritual to reunite the Wolf and the Princess.
