= Mable Hillery =

American singer

Mable Hillery (July 22, 1929 – April 27, 1976) was an American singer who was a member of the Georgia Sea Island Singers as well as a solo recording artist.

== Biography ==
Hillery was born in LaGrange, Georgia. She married Will Adams in 1950, and moved to the Georgia Sea Islands around 1960. She joined The Georgia Sea Island Singers in 1961.

She had six children, and outside of performing with The Georgia Sea Island Singers was known for her work in the public school systems of both New York City and Atlanta, Georgia. She was active in the civil rights movement in the sixties. Her obituary appeared in the New York Times on May 1, 1976.

== Partial discography ==
- Get in Union: Recordings by Alan Lomax 1959-1966 (Tompkins Square, 2015)
- It's So Hard To Be A Nigger (XTRA, 1968)
- Hotter Than a Bulldog Spitting In a Polecat's Eye - Live 1975 (with Johnny Shines, Americana Music Productions)
