= The Princess of the Stars =

The Princess of the Stars is an experimental opera or music drama by the Canadian composer R. Murray Schafer. The opera is notable because it must be performed around and on a lake, preferably as far from civilization as possible. The opera was premiered on a small lake outside Toronto in 1981 by New Music Concerts and again in 1985 for the Banff School of Fine Arts summer festival on a more remote lake in Banff National Park. The performance was attended by over five thousand people.

The Princess of the Stars, which has some basis in Native American mythology, begins about one hour before dawn; timing is coordinated with early morning events such as birds beginning to sing and the sunrise. The audience members are situated in a clearing at the water's edge. The conductor, chorus, instrumentalists and the Princess herself are hidden from view around the edges of the lake. Other main characters and dancers appear in canoes on the lake. The work begins with a seven-minute aria from the unseen Princess (a high Soprano). The aria makes use of echoes across the lake. As this aria ends canoes bearing dancers (The Dawn Birds) and actors in brightly colored costumes begin to appear from the far side of the lake. The characters of Wolf, Three-horned Enemy and Sun God are large, 7 to 18 feet high, lavishly decorated puppets mounted on long war canoes. Actors hidden within the puppets speak, sing or sprechstimme the characters' parts. (Sun God's entrance is timed with the real sunrise.) Throughout the work Schafer has written detailed instructions for the performers. All the canoe routes are scripted and the participants chant in fictional languages created by Schafer.

The Princess of the Stars is the Prologue in a series of twelve theatre pieces entitled Patria (Latin for homeland).

== Story ==
The story line of The Princess of the Stars is based, in part, on traditional tales told by various northeastern North American native peoples. In the opera, the Sun God's daughter, the Princess of the Stars, falls to the earth and is captured by Three Horned Enemy, who hides her at the bottom of a lake. Wolf, with the help of the Dawn Birds is determined to find the Princess. After an arduous search, Wolf finds the Princess in the lake and with the help of the Dawn Birds, who sweep the water aside with their wings, Wolf prepares to battle Three Horned Enemy. However, before the fight begins the sun emerges from the horizon and scares the Three Horned Enemy away. Sun God orders Wolf to search the world for the Princess (who has fled) and orders the Dawn Birds to freeze the lake and be silent until the Princess is found.
