= Angela Leigh =

Ugandan ballet dancer

Angela Leigh (1927– 30 November 2004) was a Ugandan-born founding member and former principal dancer of the National Ballet of Canada, and a former principal dancer and soloist with the Royal Ballet.

== Career ==
Born in Uganda, Leigh trained and danced with the Royal Ballet in London. There, Leigh worked with choreographer John Cranko, and met her first husband, Clayton Leigh, a Royal Canadian Air Force bomber pilot, with whom she had a daughter, Stephanie.

Leigh was one of the twenty-five founding members of the National Ballet of Canada, and danced most of the leading roles in the company's classical and modern repertoires, often opposite Joey Harris (aka Ivan Demidoff). In addition to teaching and coaching at the National Ballet's school and company, Leigh was an assistant professor of dance at both York University and George Brown College.

In the early 1950s, Leigh danced during the summer season with the Toronto Theatre Ballet.

She appeared in a leading role in the film The Other Man. Leigh's own choreography included works for the National Ballet School, the Canadian Opera Company and Ontario Ballet Theatre.

Her second marriage was to Canadian film-maker Paul Almond. Leigh's daughter Stephanie was also a dancer and pedagogue.

In 2003 Leigh helped found Ballet Victoria, the first professional ballet company on Vancouver Island, British Columbia, Canada. At the time of her death on November 30, 2004 she was the company's artistic adviser.

== See also ==
- National Ballet of Canada
- Royal Ballet
- National Ballet School of Canada
- Ballet Victoria
- Paul Almond
- History of Ballet in Canada
- Ballet in Uganda
