= Pierre Duval (singer) =

Canadian opera singer

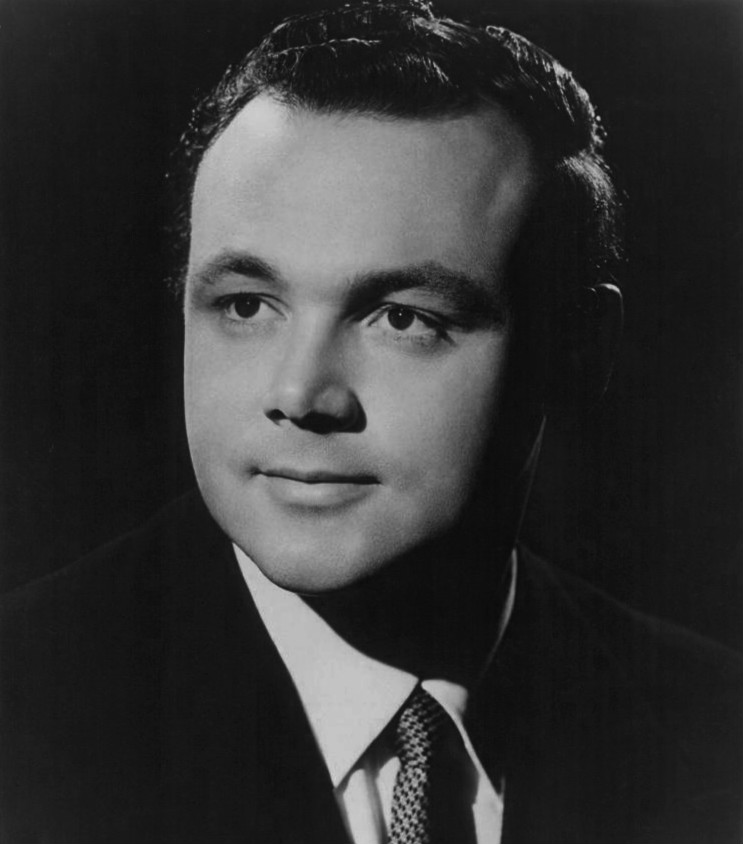
Duval in 1971.

Pierre Duval (17 September 1932 – 31 May 2004) was a French-Canadian operatic tenor who had an active international career during the 1960s and 1970s. Possessing a warm lyrical voice with a considerable amount of flexibility and stamina, Duval sang mostly roles from the standard French and Italian repertories. He particularly excelled in bel canto works, notably singing opposite such lauded bel canto interpreters as Joan Sutherland, Beverly Sills, and Montserrat Caballé during his career.

== Biography ==
Pierre Duval (stage name) was born Ovide Coutu, in Montreal, Quebec, where he took voice lessons with Frank Rowe. He then studied at the Conservatoire de musique du Québec à Montréal with Dina Maria Narici. While there he began performing on Canadian radio and television. In 1960 he made his professional opera debut at the Opéra de Montréal in the title role of Charles Gounod's Faust.

In 1961 Duval left for Italy to study on a scholarship at the Accademia Nazionale di Santa Cecilia in Rome under Alberto Volonnino. The following year he made his European debut as the Fisherman in Igor Stravinsky's Le Rossignol at the Teatro dell'Opera di Roma to great acclaim. He performed regularly in leading roles at the Rome Opera house for the next several years. In 1962 he made a number of appearances in opera houses in Spain and in 1963 he made his debut at the Glyndebourne Festival as the Italian singer in Richard Strauss's Capriccio.

== Career ==
Duval had a major triumph in 1963, drawing international recognition for his lauded recording of the role of Arturo in Bellini's I puritani, opposite Joan Sutherland, after replacing Franco Corelli as a last minute substitute. In 1964 he made his United States debut with the New York City Opera as Faust. He sang several more time with the NYCO during his career, including portraying Rinuccio in Giacomo Puccini's Gianni Schicchi (1965), Le Chevalier des Grieux in Jules Massenet's Manon (1969), the Duke of Mantua in Rigoletto (1969), and Arturo to Beverly Sill's Elvira in Vincenzo Bellini's I Puritani (1974–1975) among others. He also made several appearances at the Pittsburgh Opera during the 1960s and 1970s.

In 1967 Duval made his debut with the Philadelphia Lyric Opera Company as Elvino in Bellini's La sonnambula with Renata Scotto as Amina. He returned to that house the following season to perform Arturo to the Elvira of Anna Moffo. In 1969 he made his first appearance with the Philadelphia Grand Opera Company as Edgardo in Gaetano Donizetti's Lucia di Lammermoor with Roberta Peters in the title role. He returned to portray the Duke of Mantua opposite Carlo Meliciani's Rigoletto at the PGOC the following season. In 1970 Duval sang at the Connecticut Opera and in 1971 he made his debut with the New Orleans Opera as Nadir in Georges Bizet's Les pêcheurs de perles. He returned to New Orleans several more time, including portraying the title hero in Gounod's Roméo et Juliette (1972).

In his home country, Duval was a regular performer at the Opéra de Québec between 1967 and 1970. He also performed roles with the Théâtre de Nouvell-France, the Canadian Opera Company, the Vancouver Opera, and Opera Ottawa in the standard French and Italian repertories. He also performed as a soloist with several orchestras throughout Canada and the United States. He notably took part in a number of CBC opera telecasts, including portraying Macduff in Macbeth, in 1973, opposite Louis Quilico and Marisa Galvany.

Duval was also active on the international stage during the 1960s and 1970s. In 1966 he performed the role of Alfredo in La traviata at the Municipal Theater of Santiago in Chile. In 1969 he sang the role of Leicester in Donizetti's Roberto Devereux at the Liceu with Montserrat Caballé as Elisabetta. In 1973 he had a triumphant performance at the Teatro Comunale di Bologna in the role of Arturo.

== Recordings ==
Vincenzo Bellini

- I Puritani — Joan Sutherland (Elvira), Margreta Elkins (Enrichetta di Francia), Pierre Duval (Arturo Talbot); Piero de Palma (Sir Bruno Robertson), Renato Capecchi (Sir Riccardo Forth), Ezio Flagello (Sir Giorgio), Giovanni Fioiani (Lord Gualtiero Valton), Orchestra e Coro del Maggio Musicale Fiorentino, Richard Bonynge (conductor) - recorded 1963 – Decca 448 969-2 / Decca 467 789-2 (part of a 10-CD set) / London POCL 3965-7

    Gaetano Donizetti
   Lucia di Lammermoor - Anna Moffo (Lucia), Carlo Bergonzi (Edgardo), Mario Sereni (Lord Enrico Ashton), Ezio Flagello (Raimondo Bidebent), Pierre Duval 
   (Lord Arturo Bucklaw) - Corinna Vozza (Alisa) - Vittorio Pandano (Normanno) - Rca Italiana Opera Chorus - Rca Italiana Opera Orchestra, Georges Pretre
   conductor - recorded in 1965 - RCA Red Seal LMDS 6170 - RCA Red Seal Sony Classical 888750073472

== Sources ==
- The Encyclopedia of Music in Canada, Suzanne Thomas.
- Duval, Pierre Biography at operissimo.com
