= Ola Skanks =

Canadian dance artist, choreographer, and teacher

- Born: 28 November 1926; Toronto, Canada
- Died: 13 August 2018 (aged 91); Toronto, Canada
- Occupations: Dance artist, choreographer, teacher
- Known for: Modern dance, African diasporic dance

Ola Skanks (November 28, 1926 – August 13, 2018) was a Canadian dance artist, choreographer, and teacher. She was a pioneering figure in the development of African diasporic dances in Canada and instrumental in growing Canada’s emerging modern dance scene in the early 1960s.

Born Ola Marie Shepherd, Skanks taught herself how to tap dance at a young age. She studied Eurocentric dance styles with dancer/choreographer Willy Blok Hanson before becoming interested in dances related to her black African heritage. She also studied with American dancer, choreographer and anthropologist Pearl Primus.

In the 60s and 70s, Skanks’ choreographic work merged European interpretive dance forms with dances and movement of the African diaspora. Throughout her life, she performed, taught and choreographed in Toronto and the United States for both stage and screen, with clients including CBC Canadian Broadcasting Corporation, Mariposa Folk Festival, Caribana and the San Diego Museum of Art. She was on the faculty at the University of New York at Buffalo and taught at the Three Schools Artists’ Workshop in Toronto. In 1974, Skanks opened her own studio in Toronto.

In 2017, Skanks was one of ten notable dance pioneers inducted into the Dance Collection Danse Encore! Dance Hall of Fame. Images of Skanks were featured in Seika Boye's exhibit It's About Time: Dancing Black in Canada 1900-1970 which was shown at the Dance Collection Danse Gallery in 2017, OCADU's Ignite Gallery in 2018 and at the Progress Festival in Toronto in 2019.
