= Star Princess =

Star Princess may refer to one of the following ships:

- Star Princess (1989), in service with Princess Cruises between 1989 and 1997
- Star Princess (2001), in service with Princess Cruises between 2002 and 2020
- Star Princess (2024), in service with Princess Cruises from 2025
