= Toronto Chamber Orchestra =

The Toronto Chamber Orchestra (formerly the Toronto Camerata) was founded by violinist and conductor Kevin Mallon.

== Style ==
The orchestra reflects the period instrument Aradia Ensemble. Orchestra members play baroque instruments and perform in musical styles ranging from the 18th century to the present. The orchestra's approach focuses on the sound of period instruments.

== Recordings ==
The orchestra has recorded fifteen CDs for the Naxos label, including symphonies from Wenzel Pichl, Leopold Mozart, Franz Ignaz Beck, Johann Baptist Wanhal, Karl von Ordóñez and overtures by Domenico Cimarosa, as well as three CDs of symphonies by Joseph Haydn. The orchestra has also recorded a series of new commissions, collaborating with bassoonist Nadina Mackie Jackson and trumpeter Guy Few. This collaboration has produced two CD recordings.

== Appearances ==
Principal members of the Toronto Chamber Orchestra also perform with the Toronto Symphony Orchestra, the Canadian Opera Orchestra, the Canadian Ballet Orchestra, Tafelmusik and the Aradia Ensemble. The orchestra has performed under guest conductors Alan Trudel and Nicholas McGegan.
