= Kent Kennan =

American classical composer (1913–2003)

Kent Wheeler Kennan (April 18, 1913, in Milwaukee, Wisconsin – November 1, 2003, in Austin, Texas) was an American composer, author, educator, and professor.

== Biography ==
He learned to play the organ and the piano and received degrees in composition and music theory from the University of Michigan and the Eastman School of Music. At age 23, he was awarded the Rome Prize, which allowed him to study for three years in Europe, primarily at the American Academy in Rome. He was the half-brother of the diplomat and historian George F. Kennan.

For most of his career, Kennan was a professor at the University of Texas at Austin, also teaching briefly at Kent State University. His work as a professor was briefly interrupted by World War II, when he served as a bandmaster for the United States Army. Upon his release, he taught from 1947 to 1949 at Ohio State University before returning to the University of Texas.

His compositions include works for orchestra, chamber ensemble, and solo instruments, as well as songs and choral music. His Sonata for Trumpet and Piano is part of the standard repertoire in many collegiate trumpet studios. His Night Soliloquy was written in 1936 and is set for solo flute, piano and strings. Kennan composed his last major work in 1956 at age 43 and then largely abandoned composition, writing only occasional small pieces and devoting himself to teaching and educational writing.

His books Counterpoint and The Technique of Orchestration have been widely used as classroom texts.

On May 5, 1957, Howard Hanson and the Eastman-Rochester Orchestra recorded Kennan's Three Pieces for Orchestra, a work composed in Rome in 1936 and premiered in 1939 by Hanson and the Rochester orchestra. It was released by Mercury Records on LP (SR90147) and CD (434307-2). The three movements are "Promenade," "Nocturne," and "Il Campo dei Fiori".

On December 30, 2003, Kent Kennan: Chamber Music was released by Pierian on CD (0017). Featuring Felicity Coltman on piano, with the Austin Chamber Music Center, the album includes "Sonata for Violin and Piano" from 1937, "Night Soliloquy" from 1936, "Scherzo, Aria and Fugato for Oboe and Piano" from 1949, "Threnody for Violin and Piano" from 1992, and "Quintet for Piano and Strings" from 1935. The "Threnody" and "Quintet" were performed in the presence of the composer. Austin Chamber Music ensemble performers included Richard Kilmer, violin; Megan Meisenbach, flute; Kathleen Turner, oboe; Adrianna Hulscher, violin; Jennifer Bourianoff, violin; Ames Asbell, viola; and Margaret Coltman-Smith, cello.

== Books ==
- Kennan, Kent. The Technique of Orchestration. New Jersey: Prentice-Hall, 1952, 1970, 1983, 1990, 1996, 2002. ISBN 0-13-900308-8. ISBN 0-13-466327-6. ISBN 978-0-13-466327-2.
- Kennan, Kent. Counterpoint. New Jersey: Prentice-Hall, 1987. ISBN 0-13-184235-8. ISBN 978-0-13-184235-9.

== Recordings ==
- Giuseppe Galante - Kent Kennan: Sonata for Trumpet and Piano: I. With strength and vigor
- Giuseppe Galante - Kent Kennan: Sonata for Trumpet and Piano: II. Rather slowly and with freedom
- Giuseppe Galante - Kent Kennan: Sonata for Trumpet and Piano: III. Moderately fast, with energy
