= Lee Kum-Sing =

- Birth name: Lee Kum-Sing
- Born: Palembang, South Sumatra, Indonesia
- Genres: Classic
- Occupations: Pianist, professor
- Instruments: Piano

Lee Kum-Sing (Chinese: 李金星) is a Canadian classical pianist and piano pedagogue originally from Sumatra.

== Biography ==
Lee Kum-Sing studied with Gerhard Puchelt and Hans Richter-Haaser in Berlin and with Julius Katchen and Magda Tagliaferro in Paris. He debuted in New York's Carnegie Hall in 1963 and in London's Wigmore Hall in 1969 and has since received international recognition.

Professor Lee had been the department head of the piano program at Vancouver Academy of Music since 1971 until 2010s and was a long-time faculty member (senior lecturer) at the University of British Columbia from 1972 to 2005. He also served as a visiting professor since 1980s at the Central Conservatory of Music in Beijing, China. Many of his students have been prize winners in major national and international competitions and are now actively concertizing and recording. For decades Professor Lee has been conducting master classes and has been on the faculty at international summer schools and festivals in the Netherlands, Poland, France, Belgium, Italy, Japan, China, U.S.A., and Canada.

Lee sits on the jury of prestigious international competitions including Chopin (Warsaw, Poland) [1995] (the first Canadian invited as a jury member), Queen Elizabeth (Brussels, Belgium) [2003], China (Beijing) [2003], Rachmaninov (Moscow), Gina Bachauer (Salt Lake City), Dublin, Toronto International [2014].
