= Robert Savoie =

Canadian opera singer

Robert Savoie, OC (April 21, 1927 – September 14, 2007) was a French-Canadian operatic baritone.

== Career ==
Savoie was born in Montreal. He studied for five years with Pauline Donalda, and made his debut in 1948 with the Montreal Opera Guild, as the second Philistine in Samson et Dalila. For the next four years he sang secondary roles with that company. He then studied in Milan, Italy, with Antonio Narducci, and made his European debut there at the Teatro Nuovo, as Scarpia in Tosca.

After returning to Montréal in 1954, Savoie pursued a career on radio and television, as well as with the Opera Guild, singing roles such as; Rodrigo in Don Carlos, Figaro in Le nozze di Figaro and Il barbiere di Siviglia, Leporello in Don Giovanni, Marcello in La bohème, Sharpless in Madama Butterfly, etc. He also appeared in Québec City, Ottawa, and at the Stratford Festival. In 1961, Savoie signed a five-year contract with the Royal Opera House in London, making his debut there as Schaunard in La Bohème, and then singing the title role in Rigoletto. He also appeared with the Sadler's Wells and the Scottish Opera in Glasgow. He also performed throughout France, in a touring production of Massenet' s Don Quichotte, opposite fellow countryman, Joseph Rouleau. He sang in the BBC production of Verdi's original French version of Don Carlos (recorded 1972, broadcast 1973) with Rouleau, and André Turp.

In America, Savoie appeared in 1971, as Falstaff (opera) at the inauguration of the John F. Kennedy Center for the Performing Arts in Washington. He performed in 1972, in La Damnation de Faust, at Carnegie Hall.

Beginning in 1981, Savoie performed mainly in recital, and began giving master classes, notably at the Yale School of Music. He was appointed an Officer of the Order of Canada in 2002. He died in Montreal.

== Sources ==
- The Encyclopedia of Music in Canada, Cécile Huot, Sarah Church
