= John Avison =

Canadian classical pianist and conductor

- Born: John Henry Patrick Avison; April 25, 1915; Vancouver, British Columbia, Canada
- Died: November 30, 1983 (aged 68); Vancouver, British Columbia, Canada
- Occupations: Conductor, pianist
- Awards: Order of Canada

John Henry Patrick Avison, CM (April 25, 1915 – November 30, 1983) was a Canadian conductor and pianist. From 1938 to 1980, he was the founding conductor of the CBC Vancouver Chamber Orchestra. He was a longtime member of the Vancouver Symphony Orchestra (VSO) and was married to VSO violinist Angelina Avison. In 1978 he was made a Member of the Order of Canada, Canada's highest civilian honour, and in 1980 he was awarded the Canadian Music Council Medal.

Born in Vancouver, Avison earned an Associates diploma from the Toronto Conservatory of Music in 1929. During the early 1930s he studied in his native city with J.D.A. Tripp (piano) and Allard de Ridder (conducting). He earned a Bachelor of Arts from the University of British Columbia in 1935 and a Bachelor of Music from the University of Washington in 1936. During World War II he served in the Canadian Army, after which he pursued further music studies at the Juilliard School (1946), Columbia University (1946–1947), and Yale University (1947). At the latter school he was a pupil of Paul Hindemith.

== See also ==
- Music of Canada
- Canadian classical music
- List of Canadian musicians
