= R. Murray Schafer =

Canadian composer (1933–2021)

R. Murray Schafer CC FRCMT(hon)
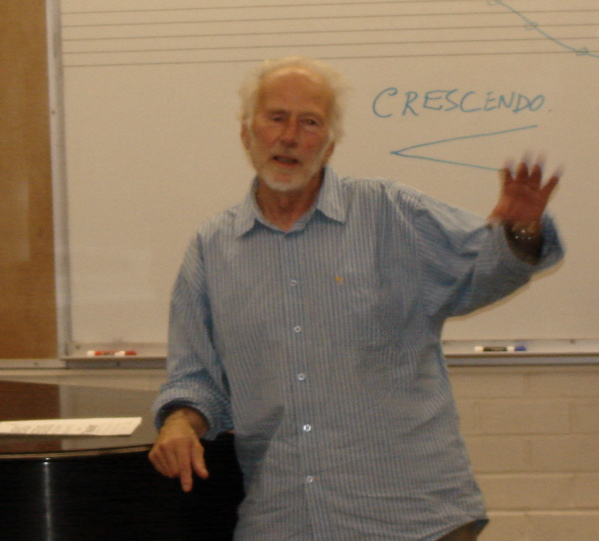
- Schafer in 2007

Background information
- Born: Raymond Murray Schafer; July 18, 1933; Sarnia, Ontario
- Died: August 14, 2021 (aged 88) Indian River, Ontario
- Genres: Avant-garde, classical, opera, musical theatre
- Occupations: Composer, writer, educator, environmentalist
- Instrument: Piano

Raymond Murray Schafer CC FRCMT(hon) (July 18, 1933 – August 14, 2021) was a Canadian composer, writer, music educator, and environmentalist perhaps best known for his World Soundscape Project, concern for acoustic ecology, and his book, The Tuning of the World (1977). He was the first recipient of the Jules Léger Prize in 1978.

== Biography ==
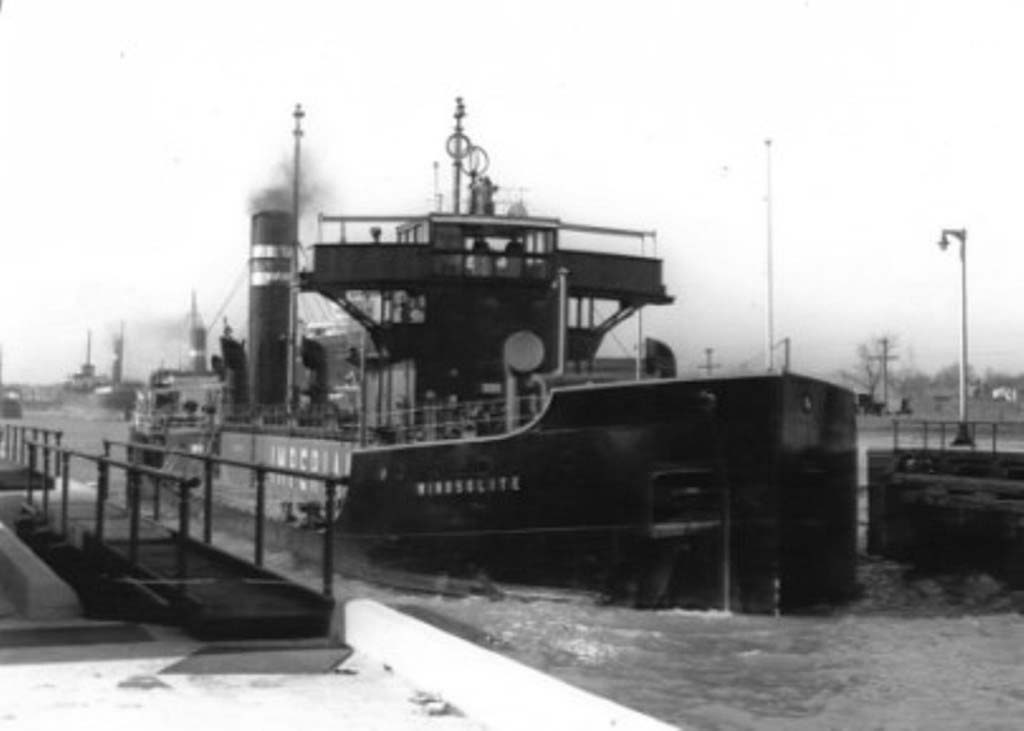
In his memoir, My Life on Earth and Elsewhere, Schafer described serving as a novice deckhand aboard the oil tanker Imperial Windsor in 1955.

Born in Sarnia, Ontario, Schafer studied at the Royal Schools of Music in London, with Alberto Guerrero at the Royal Conservatory of Music in Toronto, and at the University of Toronto, where he was a pupil of Richard Johnston.

His innovative approach to music education repeatedly challenged and transcended orthodox approaches through explorations of the relationships between music, performer, audience, and setting.

He started soundscape studies at Simon Fraser University in the 1960s. His 1977 book, The Tuning of the World, popularized the concept of soundscape (Schafer attributes the invention of the term itself to city planner Michael Southworth). Reviewing the book in The Musical Quarterly, Laske commented that it "is one of those rare texts which simultaneously broaden our notion of musical science and of music itself".

He also coined the term, schizophonia, in 1969, the splitting of a sound from its source or the condition caused by this split: "We have split the sound from the maker of the sound. Sounds have been torn from their natural sockets and given an amplified and independent existence. Vocal sound, for instance, is no longer tied to a hole in the head but is free to issue from anywhere in the landscape." Steven Feld, borrowing a term from Gregory Bateson, calls the recombination and recontextualization of sounds split from their sources schismogenesis.

A practitioner of graphic notation, Schafer's compositional oeuvre of over 100 works drew inspiration from a wide range of sources and utilized an array of performative forces. His most ambitious creative achievement was Patria, a 12-part music-theatre series written over a 40-year period.

In 1979, a five-record set of Schafer's music was included in the Anthology of Canadian Music series. The Schafer portrait in the Canadian Composers Portraits series was released in 2003.

Schafer received the first Glenn Gould Prize in 1987. He also received two Juno Awards for classical composition of the year: in 2004 for his String Quartet no. 8, and in 2011 for his Duo for Violin and Piano.

In 2003 Schafer was the artistic director of Coimbra Vibra!, an event that celebrated music and the acoustic environment, gathering 1,200 musicians and over 10,000 spectators in Coimbra, Portugal. In 2005 Schafer was keynote speaker at the 12th International Congress on Sound and Vibration. His presentation was entitled, "I Have Never Seen a Sound."

In 2005 Schafer was awarded the Walter Carsen Prize by the Canada Council for the Arts for lifetime achievement by a Canadian artist. In 2009, Schafer received the Governor General's Performing Arts Award for Lifetime Artistic Achievement. In 2013, he was made a Companion of the Order of Canada "for his contributions as an internationally renowned composer of contemporary music, and for his groundbreaking work in acoustic ecology".

Schafer died at his rural home in Indian River near Peterborough, Ontario, of Alzheimer's disease on August 14, 2021.

Since 2010, a World Listening Day organized by the World Listening Project has been held annually on July 18th; the date was chosen to honour Schafer's birthday.

== Selected works ==
=== Compositions ===
- Stage works
  - Job (Schafer et al., after the Biblical Book of Job). 2011 (Kingston, Ont 2011). Chor (SATB), actors.
  - Jonah (Schafer et al., after the Biblical Book of Jonah). 1979 (Maynooth, Ont 1979). Chor (SATB), actors, fl, clarinet, organ, percussion. Arcana 1980
  - Patria
    - Patria: The Prologue, The Princess of the Stars
    - Patria 1: Wolfman
    - Patria 2: Requiems for the Party Girl
    - Patria 3: The Greatest Show
      - Adapted into the film Carnival of Shadows
    - Patria 4: The Black Theatre of Hermes Trismegistos
    - Patria 5: The Crown of Ariadne
    - Patria 6: Ra
    - Patria 7: Asterion
    - Patria 8: The Palace of the Cinnabar Phoenix
    - Patria 9: The Enchanted Forest
    - Patria 10: The Spirit Garden
    - Patria: The Epilogue: And Wolf Shall Inherit the Moon
- Orchestra
  - In Memoriam: Alberto Guerrero. 1959 (Vancouver 1962). Str orch. Arcana 1985. Centrediscs CMC-2887 (Vancouver Symphony Orchestra)
  - Partita for String Orchestra. 1961 (Hal 1963). Arcana. CBC SM-15 (CBC Vancouver Orchestra)
  - Canzoni for Prisoners. 1962 (Montreal 1963). Full orch. Ber 1977
  - Untitled Composition for Orchestra No.1. 1963 (Toronto 1966). Sm orch. Ber 1977
  - Untitled Composition for Orchestra No. 2. 1963. Full orch. Ber 1977
  - Statement in Blue. 1964 (Toronto 1965). Youth orch. BMIC 1966, UE 1971. 1970. Mel SMLP-4017 (Lawrence Park Collegiate O, J. McDougall conductor)
  - Son of Heldenleben. 1968 (Montreal 1968). Full orch, tape. UE 1976. RCI 387/Sel CC-15-101/5-ACM 3 (MSO)
  - No Longer than Ten (10) Minutes. 1970. Rev 1972 (Toronto 1971). Full orch. Ber 1977
  - East (meditations on a text from Ishna Upanishad). 1972 (Bath, England, 1973). Sm orch. UE 1977. RCI 434/5-ACM 3 (NACO)
  - North/White. 1973 (Vancouver 1973). Full orch, snowmobile. UE 1980
  - Train. 1976 (Toronto 1976). Youth orch. Ber 1977
  - Cortège. 1977(Ott 1977). Sm orch. UE 1981
  - Ko wo kiku ('Listen to the Incense'). 1985 (Kyoto 1985). Full orch. Arcana 1989
  - Dream Rainbow Dream Thunder. 1986 (Kingston 1986). Full orch. Arcana 1989. CBC SMCD-5101 (Esprit Orchestra)
  - Scorpius. 1990 (Toronto 1990). Orch. Arcana 1990
  - Symphony No. 1 in C Minor (2010)
- Soloists and/or Choir with Orchestra
  - Minnelieder (various Medieval German poets). 1956 (chamber version), 1987 (orch version) (Quebec City 1987 orch version). Mezzo, woodwind quintet or mezzo, orch. Ber 1970 (chamber version), Arcana (rental, orch version, with one additional song 'Über den Linden,' text by Walter von der Vogelweider). (chamber version) RCI 218/RCA CCS-1012/5-ACM 3
  - Protest and Incarceration (East European poets). 1960 (Toronto 1967). Mezzo, orch. Ms
  - Brébeuf, cantata (Brébeuf, transl Schafer). 1961 (Toronto 1966). Bar, orch. Arcana 1981
  - Threnody (Japanese children). 1966, rev 1967 (Vancouver 1967). Choir, orch, tape. Ber 1970. 1970. Mel SMLP-4017 (Lawrence Park Collegiate O and Choir, J. Barron conductor)
  - Lustro. 1970-2 (CBC Toronto 1973). Comprising:
  - Part 1: Divan i Shams i Tabriz (Jalal al din Rumi). 1969, rev 1970. 6 solo voices, orch, tape. UE 1977
  - Part 2: Music for the Morning of the World (various). 1970. V, 4-track tape. UE 1973. 2-Mel SMLP-4035-6 (K. Terrell)
  - Part 3: Beyond the Great Gate of Light (Tagore). 1972. 6 solo voices, orch, tape. UE 1977
  - Arcana (Schafer, transl into Middle Egyptian hieroglyphs by D.B. Redford) 12 of the 14 songs (all but no. 9 and 12) appear in Patria 4. 1972 (Montreal 1973 orch version). V, orch (voice, chamber ensemble). Ms. UE 1977 (chamber version). RCI 434/5-ACM 3 (Morrison)
  - Adieu Robert Schumann (Clara Schumann, adapt Schafer). 1976. Alto, orch. UE 1980. CBC SM-364 (Forrester)
  - Hymn to Night (Novalis) from Patria 7. 1976. Sop, small orch, tape. UE 1981. CBC SM-364 (Turofsky, CBC Vancouver Orchestra)
  - The Garden of the Heart (The Thousand and One Nights). 1980 (Ottawa 1981). Alto, full orch. Arcana 1982
  - Concerto for Flute. 1984 (Montreal 1984). Fl, full orch. Arcana 1985
  - Letters from Mignon. 1987 (Calgary 1987). Mezzo, orch. Arcana 1989
  - Concerto for Harp. 1987 (Toronto 1988). Hp, full orch, tape. Arcana 1988
  - Concerto for Guitar. 1989 (Toronto 1990). Guit, small orch. Arcana 1989
  - The Darkly Splendid Earth: The Lonely Traveller. 1991 (Toronto 1991). Vn, full orch. Arcana
  - Gitanjali (Rabindranath Tagore). 1991 (Ott 1992). Sop, small orch. Arcana 1990
  - Accordion Concerto. 1993. Accordion, orch
  - Concerto for Viola and Orchestra. 1997. Viola, orch
  - The Falcon's Trumpet (Concerto for Trumpet and Orchestra), 1996. Arcana.
- Chamber
  - Concerto for Harpsichord and Eight Wind Instruments. 1954 (Montreal 1959). Arcana 1990. RCI 193 (K. Jones harpsichord)/Centrediscs CMC-CD-3488 (Tilney harpsichord)
  - Sonatina for Flute and Harpsichord (or Piano). 1958. Ber 1976
  - Five Studies on Texts by Prudentius. 1962. Sop, 4 fl. BMIC 1965
  - 4 arias from Loving: The Geography of Eros (1963), and Air Ishtar, Modesty, Vanity (all 1965). Sop, chamber ensemble (Modesty), mezzo, chamber ensemble (Ishtar, Vanity, and Eros). Ber 1979
  - Requiems for the Party Girl (Schafer) from Patria 2. 1966. Mezzo, chamber ensemble. BMIC 1967. RCI 299/5-ACM 3 (Mailing mezzo, SMCQ)/Mel SMLP-4026 (Mailing, instr ensemble, Schafer conductor)/CRI SD-245 (Pilgrim soprano, Chicago U Contemporary Chamb Players, Shapey conductor)
  - Minimusic. 1967. Any comb of instr or voice. UE 1971, Ber 1972
  - String Quartet No. 1. 1970. UE 1973. RCI 353/Mel SMLP-4026 (Purcell String Quartet)/Concert Hall SMS-2902/Mel SMLP-4038/2-Centrediscs CMC-CD-39-4090 (Orford String Quartet)
  - Enchantress (Sappho). 1971. V, exotic fl, 8 violoncello. Ber 1978
  - String Quartet No. 2 ('Waves'). 1976. Ber 1978. Mel SMLP-4038/2-Centrediscs CMC-CD-39-4090 (Orford String Quartet)/RCI 476/5-ACM 3 (Purcell String Quartet)
  - The Crown of Ariadne, from Patria 3 and Patria 5. Ca 1979. Hp, percussion (by the harpist). Arcana 1980. Aquitaine MS-90570/Centrediscs CMC-CD-41-4292 (Loman)/Mark MC-20485 (Mario Falcao)
  - Music for Wilderness Lake. 1979. 12 trombone, small rural lake. Arcana 1981
  - Beauty and the Beast (Schafer, after de Beaumont) from Patria 3. 1979. Alto with masks, string quartet. Arcana 1983 (Eng text and French transl)
  - Wizard Oil and Indian Sagwa (Schafer) from Patria 3. 1980. Speaker, clarinet. Arcana 1982
  - String Quartet No. 3. 1981. Arcana 1983. 2-Centrediscs CMC-CD 39-4090 (Orford String Quartet)
  - Theseus. 1983. Hp, string quartet. Arcana 1988. Centrediscs CMC-CD-41-4292 (Loman)
  - Buskers (formerly Rounds), from Patria 3. 1985. Fl, violin, viola. Arcana
  - Le Cri de Merlin. 1987. Guit, tape. Arcana 1987. Chandos ABTD-1419/Chandos CHAN-8784 (CD) (Kraft)
  - String Quartet No. 4. 1989. Str quartet, soprano. Arcana 1989. 2-Centrediscs CMC-CD-39-4090 (Orford String Quartet, Wendy Humphreys)
  - String Quartet No. 5 ('Rosalind'). 1989. Arcana 1989. 2-Centrediscs CMC-CD-39-4090 (Orford String Quartet)
  - String Quartet No. 6 ('Parting Wild Horse's Mane'). 1993
  - String Quartet No. 7. Soprano and percussion. 1998
  - Four-Forty. String quartet, orch. 2000
  - String Quartet No. 8. Tape. 2001
  - String Quartet No. 9. 2005
  - String Quartet No. 10. 2005
  - String Quartet No. 11. 2006
  - String Quartet No. 12. 2012
  - String Quartet No. 13. 2015
- Choir
  - Four Songs on Texts of Tagore. 1962. Sop, mezzo, alto, SA. Ms
  - Gita (Bhagavad Gita), from Patria 1. 1967. SATB, brass, tape. UE 1977
  - Epitaph for Moonlight (invented words by Grade 7 students), from Patria 5. 1968. SATB, bells (optional). BMIC 1969, UE 1971. CBC SM-274/5-ACM 3 (Festival Singers)/Mel SMLP-4017 (Lawrence Park Collegiate Choir, J. Barron conductor)/Grouse GR-101-C (cass) (Vancouver Chamber Choir)/P3-C (cass) (Powell River Academy Singers, Don James dir)/World WRC-257 (University of Alberta Concert Choir, Larry Cook conductor)
  - From the Tibetan Book of the Dead (Bardo Thödol) from Patria 2. 1968. Sop, SATB, alto flute, clarinet, tape. UE 1973
  - Two Anthems (formerly Yeow and Pax) (Isaiah). 1969. SATB, organ, tape. Ber 1980
  - In Search of Zoroaster (Sacred Books of the East). 1971. Male voice, SATB (at least 150 voices), percussion, organ (tape). Ber 1976
  - Miniwanka or the Moments of Water (North American Indian dialects). 1971. SA (SATB). UE 1973. RCI 434 (Vancouver Bach Choir)/Grouse GR-101-C (cass) (Vancouver Chamber Choir)/ARU 8701-CD (F.A.C.E. Senior Treble Choir, Iwan Edwards, dir)/Centrediscs CMC-2285 (Toronto Children's Chor)/Imperial unnumbered (Powell River Boys' Choir, James dir)
  - Psalm (formerly Tehillah), from Apocalypsis (Psalm 148). 1972, rev 1976. Mixed chorus, percussion. Ber 1976. RCI 434 (Vancouver Bach Choir)
  - Credo (Giordano Bruno, adapt by Schafer), from Apocalypsis. 1977. 12 choirs, tape, optional string and/or synthesizer. Arcana 1986
  - Felix's Girls (Henry Felix) from Patria 3. 1979. SATB quartet or choir. Arcana 1980. Grouse GR-101-C (cass) (Vancouver Chamber Choir)
  - Gamelan (Balinese solmization syllables), from Patria 3. 1979. Quar or choir (SATB, SASA, TBTB). Arcana 1980. Grouse GR-100/Marquis MAR-106/Grouse 101-C (cass) (Vancouver Chamber Choir)
  - Sun (words for sun in 36 languages) from Princess of the Stars (Patria prologue). 1982. SATB. Arcana 1983. 2-Centrediscs CMC-14-1584/RCI 585 (Elmer Iseler Singers)/Grouse GR-101-C (cass) (Vancouver Chamber Choir)
  - A Garden of Bells (Schafer et al.). 1983. SATB. Arcana 1984. Grouse GR-101-C (cass) (Vancouver Chamber Choir)
  - Snowforms (Inuit words for 'snow'). 1981, rev 1983. SA. Arcana 1986. Grouse GR-101-C (cass) (Vancouver Chamber Choir)
  - The Star Princess and the Waterlilies (Schafer), from And Wolf Shall Inherit the Moon (Patria conclusion). 1984. Narr, children's chorus, light percussion. Arcana 1984. TCC TCC-D-004 (Toronto Children's Chor)
  - Fire (Schafer) from Patria 5. 1986. SATB, light percussion. Arcana 1986. Grouse GR-101-C (cass) (Vancouver Chamb Choir)
  - Magic Songs (Schafer). 1988. SATB (TTBB). Arcana 1988
  - The Death of the Buddha (Mahaperinibbana Sutta). 1989. Mixed chorus, gongs, bell tree. Arcana 1989
  - Vox Naturae, from De Rerum Natura. 1997
  - Apocalypsis, revised version 2015, Toronto Luminato Festival, June. Multiple choirs, dancers, actors, throat singer
- Voice
  - Three Contemporaries (Schafer). 1956. Mezzo, piano. Ber 1974
  - Kinderlieder (traditional, Brecht). 1958. Sop, piano. Ber 1975. CBC SM-141 (Mailing mezzo)
  - La Testa d'Adriane (Schafer), from Patria 3. 1977. Sop, accordion. Arcana 1980/in R. Murray Schafer: A Collection. Mel SMLP-4034 (Morrison soprano)
  - Sun Father Sky Mother (Schafer) from And Wolf Shall Inherit the Moon (Patria conclusion). 1985. Solo voice in a mountain setting, near water and forest. Musical Canada
  - Tantrika (Sanskrit words from Tantric texts), from Patria 3. 1986. Mezzo, 4 percussion. 1986
  - Gitanjali (Rabindranath Tagore). 1991. Soprano, orch
- Other
  - Kaleidoscope. 1967. Multi-track tape
  - Okeanos (Hesiod, Homer, Melville, Pound, et al.). 1971. 4-track tape (composed with Bruce Davis, text compiled with Brian Fawcett)
  - Dream Passage (Schafer). 1969 (CBC radio 1969). Radio version of Patria 2: Requiems for the Party Girl. Mezzo, chamber ensemble, tape
  - Hear Me Out (Schafer) from Patria 3. 1979. 4 speaking voices. Arcana 1980
  - One movement for Ontario Variations. 1979. Pf, variations by Ontario composers, on a theme by Jack Behrens
  - Harbour Symphony. 1983. Fog horns. Ms. Portion of score printed in Musicworks 25, Summer 1983
  - Also a work for piano solo, Polytonality (1954, Ber 1974), and several works in all categories, that were withdrawn by the composer
  - Wolf Music (2003)

=== Written works ===
- Ezra Pound and Music: The Complete Criticism. 1961. Editor
- British Composers in Interview. 1963.
- The Composer in the Classroom. 1965.
- Ear Cleaning: Notes for an Experimental Music Course. 1967. Reprinted in The Thinking Ear. 1986.
- The New Soundscape: A Handbook for the Modern Teacher. 1969.
- The Book of Noise. 1970.
- When Words Sing. 1970.
- The Music of the Environment. 1973.
- The Rhinoceros in the Classroom. 1975.
- E.T.A. Hoffmann and Music. 1975.
- Creative Music Education: A Handbook for the Modern Music Teacher. 1976.
- Smoke: A Novel. 1976. Reprinted as Ariadne. 1985.
- The Tuning of the World. 1977. Republished as The Soundscape (1994) ISBN 978-0-89281-455-8
- Five Village Soundscapes. 1977. Editor.
- Music in the Cold. 1977.. Reprinted in: On Canadian Music. 1984.
- The Chaldean Inscription. 1978.
- R. Murray Schafer: A Collection. 1979.
- The Sixteen Scribes. 1981.
- On Canadian Music. 1984.
- Dicamus et Labyrinthos: A Philologist's Notebook. 1984.
- The Thinking Ear: On Music Education. 1986.
- Patria and the Theatre of Confluence. 1991.
- A Sound Education: 100 Exercises in Listening and Soundmaking. 1992.
- Voices of Tyranny: Temples of Silence. 1993.
- Wolf Tracks. 1997.
- Patria: The Complete Cycle. 2002.
- Shadowgraphs and Legends. 2004.
- The Enchanted Forest. 2005. Book & CD
- HearSing. 2005.
- A Little Sound Education. 2009. With Tadahiko Imada 今田匡彦, Shunjusha 春秋社，Tokyo ISBN 978-4-393-93539-2
- My Life on Earth & Elsewhere. 2012.

== See also ==
- Sound culture
- Sound map
