= Harry Somers =

Canadian composer

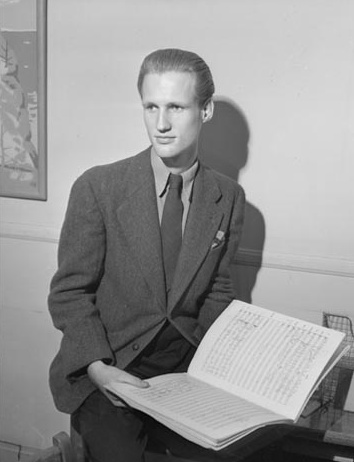
- Somers in 1947

Background information
- Born: September 11, 1925; Toronto, Ontario, Canada
- Died: March 9, 1999 (aged 73) Toronto, Ontario, Canada

Harry Stewart Somers, CC (September 11, 1925 – March 9, 1999) was a contemporary Canadian composer.

Somers earned the unofficial title of "Darling of Canadian Composition." He was a founding member of the Canadian League of Composers (CLC) and involved in the formation of other Canadian music organizations, including the Canada Council for the Arts and the Canadian Music Centre. He received commissions from the Canadian Broadcasting Corporation and the Canada Council for the Arts.

== Biography ==
=== Early life ===
Somers was born in Toronto, Ontario, Canada, on September 11, 1925. Somers did not become involved in formal musical study until he reached his teenage years in 1939 when he met a doctor and his wife—both pianists—who introduced him to classical works. Somers described this first encounter years later: "A spark was ignited, and he became obsessed with music. Almost from that instant, he knew music would be his life, for better or for worse."

=== Musical education ===
Somers was 14 when he began his study of piano under the tutelage of Dorothy Hornfelt, the neighborhood piano teacher. After two years with her, he was able to pass the Grade VIII examination at the Toronto Conservatory.

In 1942, Somers began studying under Reginald Godden at the conservatory, whom he stayed with until 1943. Godden later directed him to pursue formal studies under John Weinzweig. Weinzweig set up a program of traditional harmony study for him to study the 12-tone techniques. (Schoenberg had enforced similarly strict lessons in traditional harmony upon his own pupils, even as he encouraged them to explore dodecaphony.) Somers remained under Weinzweig's instruction until 1949.

Somers took a sabbatical from his studies in 1943 to serve with the Royal Canadian Air Force during World War II. After WWII, Somers returned to the Royal Conservatory to continue his studies with Weinzweig with a new piano teacher, Weldon Kilburn. During this time, Somers was writing and performing his own works. Somers completed his studies at the conservatory in 1948 and then spent the summer in San Francisco studying piano under E. Robert Schmitz. His work was part of the music event in the art competition at the 1948 Summer Olympics.

In 1949, Somers started to focus on composition. In 1949, he was awarded a $2000 Canadian Amateur Hockey Association scholarship to spend a year in Paris studying composition with Darius Milhaud. Somers composed his suite for harp and orchestra in 1949. In Paris, Somers heard the music of Boulez and Messiaen; these composers would influence his later music.

=== 1950s and 1960s ===
After his year with Darius Milhaud, Somers spent the 1950s devoted to composition. He earned his income as a music copyist. He composed his Symphony No.1 in 1951. In the 1950s, he improved his guitar skills. In the 1960s, he earned money of his commissions. He returned to Paris for more compositional studies with Canada Council for the Arts fellowship. While there, he concentrated on Gregorian chant, particularly its revival by the Solesmes Abbey. In 1963, he became a member of the John Adaskin Project, which was an in-school initiative. Also in 1963, Somers began his part-time career with the Canadian Broadcasting Corporation by hosting televised youth concerts.

Somers's first wife, Catherine Mackie, died in 1963.

In 1965, Somers began hosting the CBC radio series "Music of Today" and continued hosting it until 1969. He also became the special consultant of the North York School in Toronto from 1968 to 1969. In 1967, he remarried to the Canadian actress Barbara Chilcott. Also in 1967, he produced his best-known work, the opera Louis Riel, commissioned for Canada's Centennial Year celebrations. In 1969, he received an $18,000 grant from the Canadian Cultural Institute in Rome. He spent two years there, during which time he wrote Voiceplay and Kyrie.

=== 1970s – 1990s ===
In 1971, after he returned to Canada from his work in Rome, Somers was made a Companion of the Order of Canada. He was awarded three honorary doctorates: one from the University of Ottawa (1975), one from York University (1975), and one from the University of Toronto (1976). In 1977, Somers made a visit to the USSR. While there, he gave lectures on Contemporary Canadian composition and spoke to other contemporary composers. During the 1980s, Somers received commissions for the Banff International String Quartet Competition, the Guelph Spring Festival, the S.C. Eckhardt-Gramatté Competition and the Canadian Opera Company.

In the 1990s, he composed two operas, Serinette to a libretto by James Reaney, and Mario the Magician, which was adapted from a story by Thomas Mann.

Somers also completed his music Third Piano Concerto in 1996. Somers gave the opening address at the Alberta Music Conference in 1993, wrote a choral piece for the 50th Anniversary of the United Nations in 1995, and served as the writer-in-residence for the first "Word and Music Festival" held at the University of Windsor in 1997. Canada honoured him in 1995 with tribute concerts given by the University of Ottawa and the National Arts Centre for his 70th birthday.

Somers died on March 9, 1999, in Toronto, Ontario.

Between Composers, a volume of correspondence between Somers and Norma Beecroft written in 1959-60 (they were in a romantic relationship at the time), was published in 2024.

== Styles ==
Harry Somers had an eclectic approach. His music was performed in the US, Central and South Americas, Europe and the Soviet Union. His works include techniques such as vocalization, vowel and breath sounds, and timbrel inflections. The styles that are said to have influenced Somers the most are the music of Weinzweig, Bartók and Ives, Baroque counterpoint, serial technique and Gregorian chant.

Under Weinzweig, during the 1940s, Somers received his first formal instruction in composition. Prior to that point, he composed mainly in the style of the piano works he was playing. In 1950s, Somers focused on the use of fugue-related textures and techniques. Over half of the works written between 1950 and 1961 contain fugal movements. Some of his works feature "sharp, nervous, rhythmic vitality, which often serves as a foil for slower-moving subsidiary melodic lines."

A 10-record set of Somers' music was included in the Anthology of Canadian Music series in 1980. The Somers' portrait in the Canadian Composers Portraits series was released in 2006.

== Bibliography ==
- Beckwith, John (1974). "Harry Somers". In Vinton, John (ed.). Dictionary of Contemporary Music. New York, NY: Dutton. pp. 689–90.
- Cherney, Brian (1975). Harry Somers. Canadian Composers. Vol. 1. University of Toronto Press. ISBN 0-8020-5325-4.
- Cherney, Brian (1995). "Somers, Harry". In Sadie, Stanley (ed.). The New Grove Dictionary of Music and Musicians. Macmillan. pp. 473–75.
- Cherney, Brian, ed. (2024). Between Composers: The Letters of Norma Beecroft and Harry Somers. McGill-Queen's University Press. ISBN 978-0-2280-2274-9.
- MacMillan, Keith; Beckwith, John, eds. (1975). "Somers, Harry". Contemporary Canadian Composers. Toronto: Oxford University Press. pp. 207–14.
- Renihan, Colleen L. (2011). Sounding the Past: Canadian Opera as Historical Narrative (Ph.D. thesis, Musicology). University of Toronto.
- Such, Peter (1972). "Harry Somers". Soundprints: Contemporary Composers. Toronto: Clarke, Irwin. pp. 30–53.
- Wolters, Benita (1999). The Early Years of the Canadian League of Composers (M.A., Music). University of British Columbia.
- Zinck, Andrew M. (1993). "Bridging the Gap: The Operas of Harry Somers." SoundNotes. SN4:14-24.
