= Roland Richard =

Canadian singer and stage manager

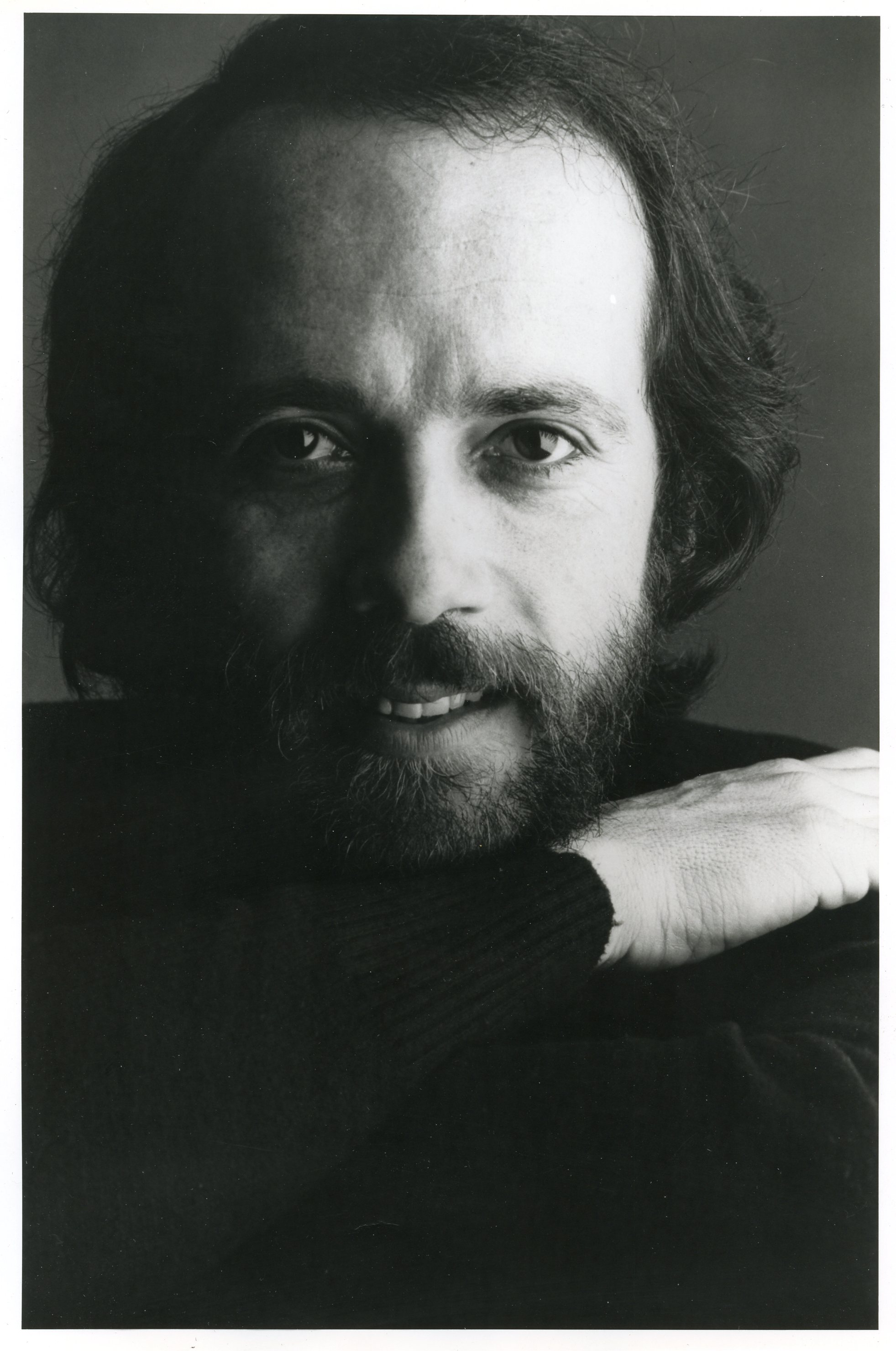
- Born: Roland Joseph Richard; June 19, 1943; Rogersville, New Brunswick, Canada
- Died: February 10, 2024 (aged 80); Montreal, Quebec, Canada
- Resting place: Rogersville Parish Cemetery, N.B., Canada
- Occupations: Singer and Stage Manager
- Years active: late-1950s to 2010
- Spouse: Denise Massé (m. 1969)

Roland Richard (June 19, 1943 – February 10, 2024) was a Canadian classical baritone and opera singer who was a frequent recitalist on CBC networks and their musical programs from the mid-1960s through to the early-1980s.

== Biography ==
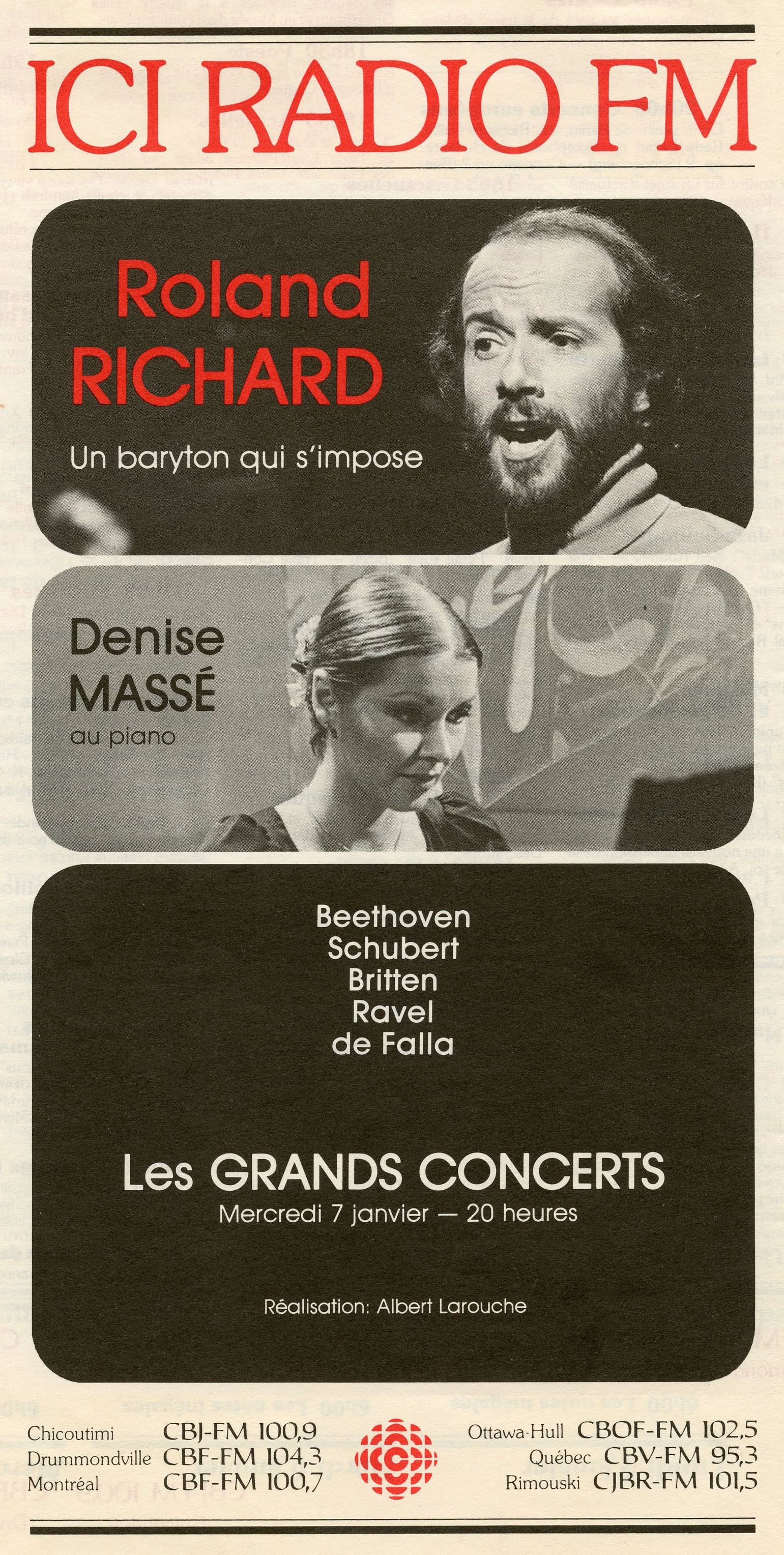
Roland Richard and Denise Massé on CBC Ici Radio FM (1981)

Roland Richard was born in the Acadian village of Rogersville (New Brunswick, Canada) and began his singing career as a boy treble/soprano, recording his first album on his 15th birthday.

As his voice transitioned to baritone, Roland Richard left for Montreal and received a Bachelor of Music from the École Vincent d'Indy and a Master's in Music from the Université de Montréal (1966).

During this time, he performed as a soloist with the Montreal Symphony, sang at the Stratford Festival (1964), and appeared in Radio-Canada's Emmy-award winning series 'The Concert Hour', performing in The Barber of Seville (1965), and later, on the CBC Television series 'Festival'. He was selected for the Théâtre du Nouveau Monde's participation in the Commonwealth Arts Festival in England (1965), as well as for the Canadian Centennial (1967). In 1967 he also became a member of the Canadian Opera Company and featured at the Expo 67 Youth Pavilion's presentation of Il segreto di Susanna.

In 1968 he won the Prix d'Europe, and after receiving a further Canada Council grant (1969), moved to Vienna with his spouse, pianist Denise Massé. There he was admitted in the 3rd and final year of the music program at the Imperial Academy of Music and the Performing Arts and studied with the accompanist Erik Werba and composer Kurt Schmidek. In keeping with traditional interpretation, Roland Richard then studied in Munich with baritone Hans Hotter.

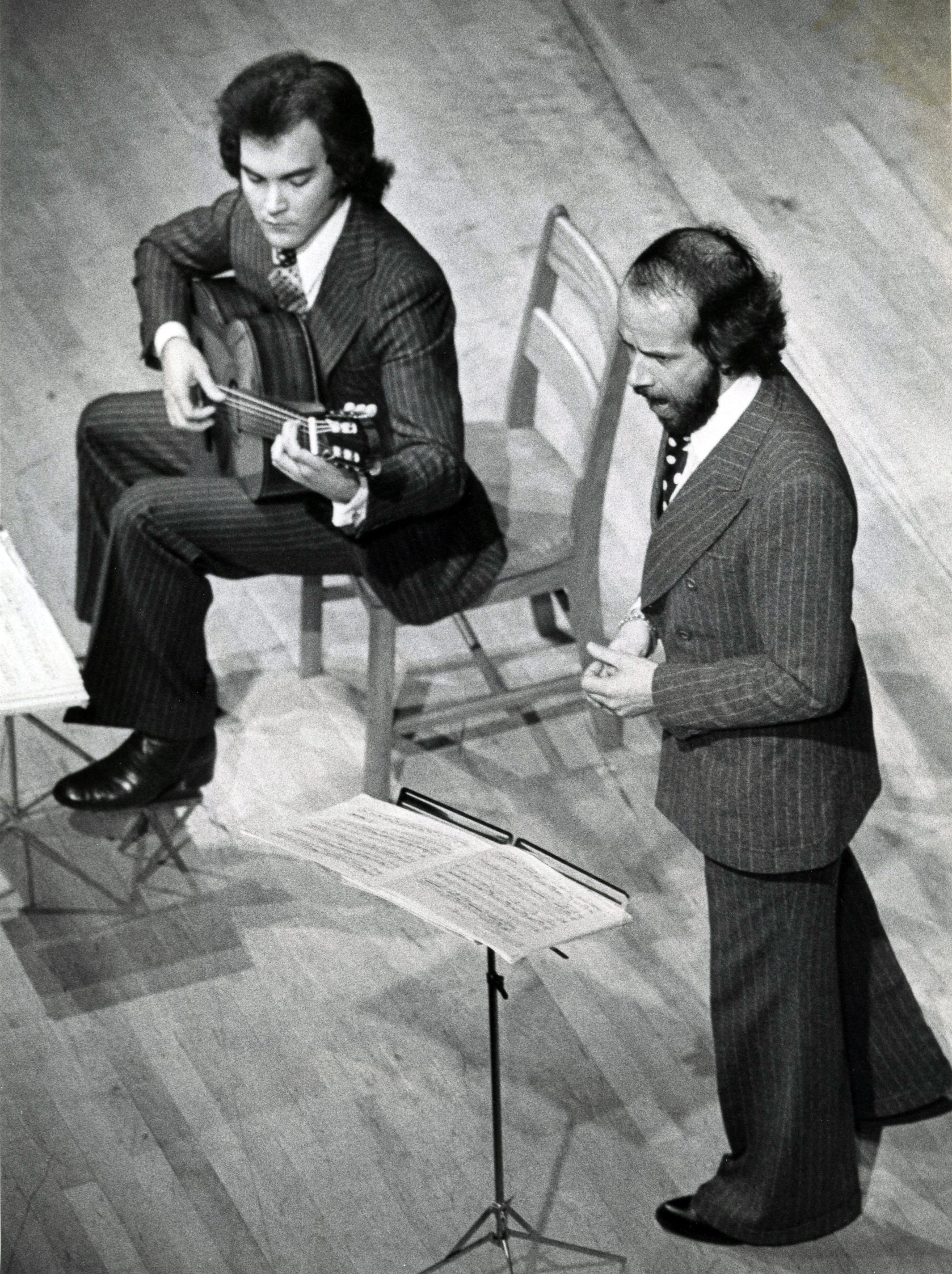
Roland Richard with Josep Henríquez (1978)

Roland Richard moved back to Montreal in 1972 and continued his musical career for the next 12 years. During this time, he toured with Jeunesses Musicales Canada, again with the Canadian Opera Company, recorded with the Quebec Contemporary Music Society under Serge Garant, and sang in productions by the Opéra de Québec, l'Opéra de Montréal, the Montreal Symphony Orchestra, Les Grands Ballets Canadiens and at the National Arts Centre, with artists such as Louis Quilico, Maureen Forrester, and Frederica von Stade.

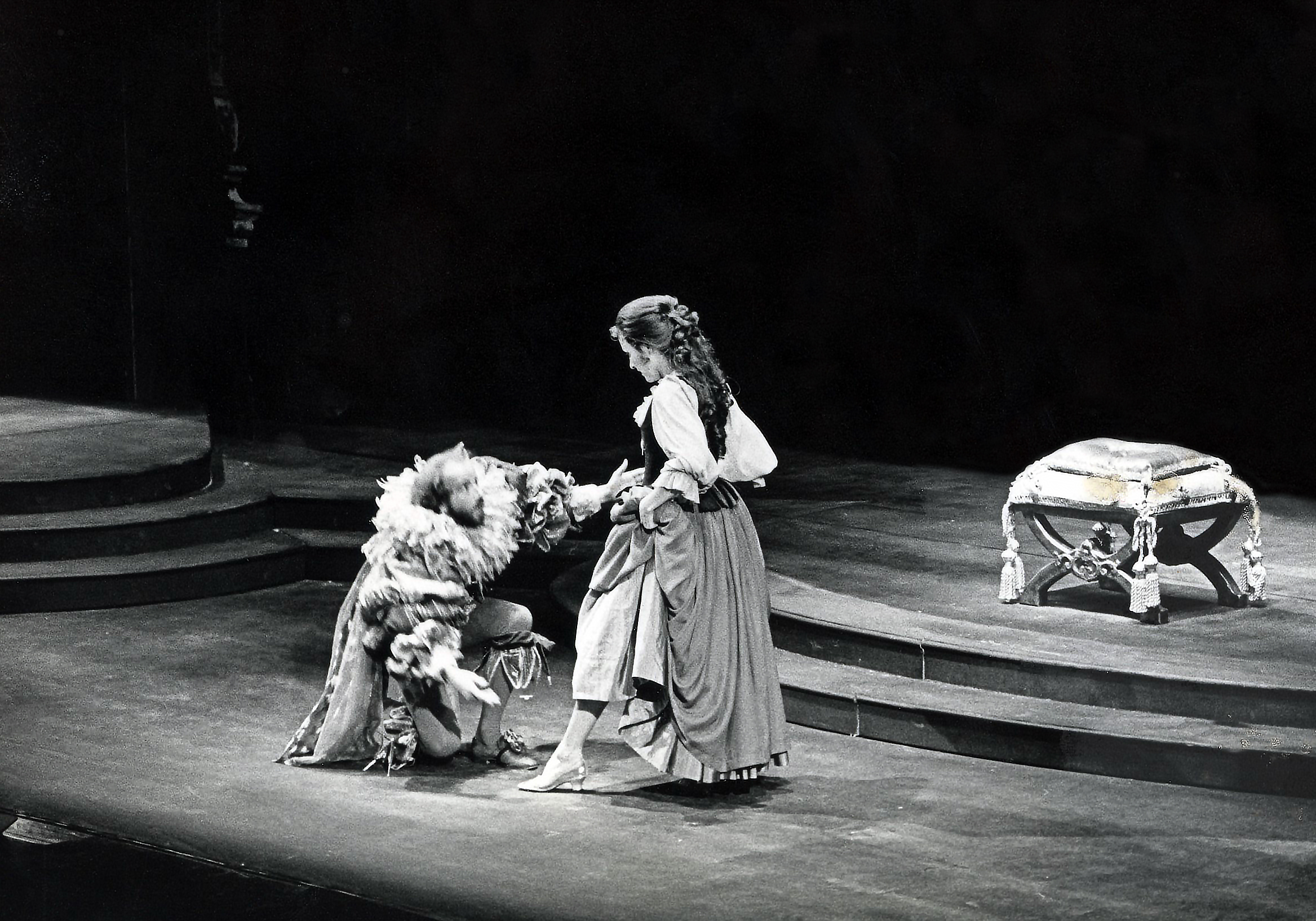
Roland Richard and Frederica von Stade in Massenet's Cendrillon (1979) at the National Arts Centre

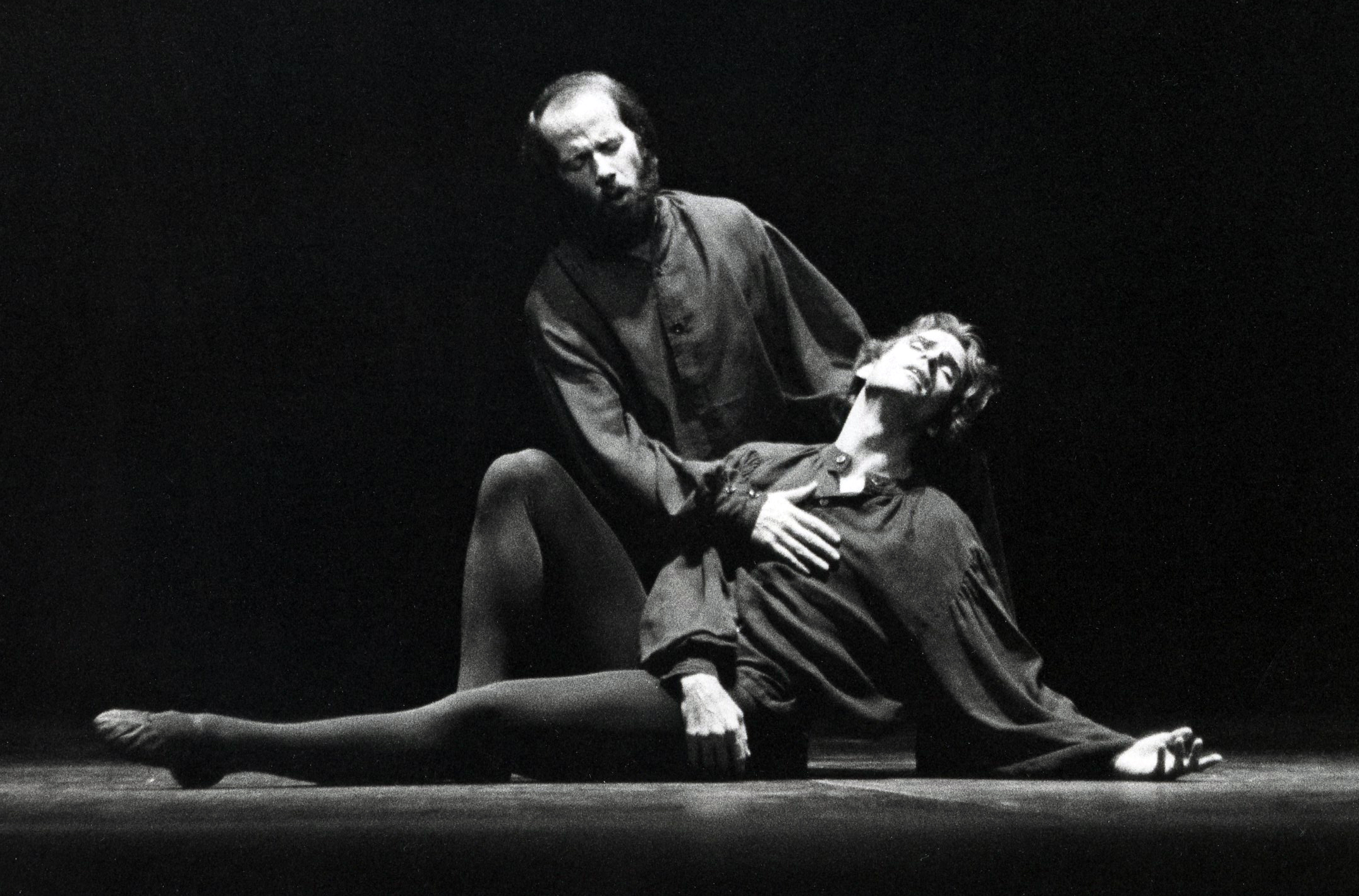
Roland Richard and Vincent Warren in Artère (1976), Les Grands Ballets Canadiens - Hommage à Pierre Mercure

Later, Roland Richard sang as a guest artist for Quartango, a chamber ensemble newly founded by musicians of the Montreal Symphony Orchestra. In 1985, he recorded with Quartango on CBC Radio's Spotlight Series and performed with them on CBC's Les Beaux Dimanches in 1987.

While touring as a singer Roland Richard also taught at the music departments of Ottawa University, the Université de Montreal, and Université Laval, and developed an interest in the technical aspects of stage presentations, which eventually led him to stage management. He became the assistant stage manager for the Opéra de Montréal at its inception in 1980, and in 1984 became principal stage manager (where he was also credited as an assistant stage director on many of their productions) until 1994. During this period he also taught stage management at the National Theatre School of Canada.

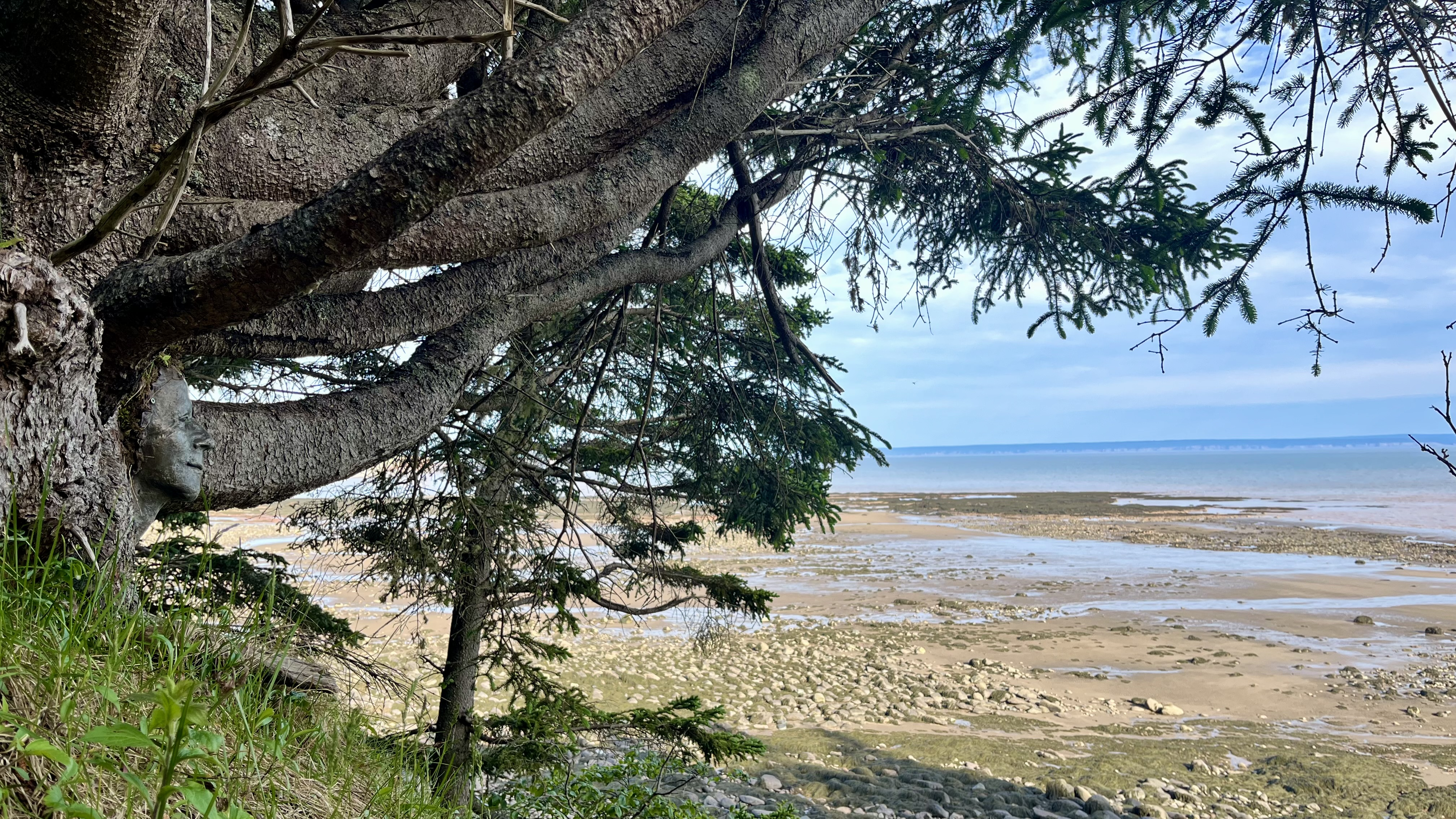
In Memoriam, overlooking the Bay of Fundy

In 1995, Roland Richard became a general stage manager for the Cirque du Soleil and worked on multiple productions touring the world until his retirement in 2010. He died in Montreal on February 10, 2024, after suffering from dementia. In 2025, a bronze memorial bust was placed near Dennis Beach, Alma, N.B. The Performing Arts Foundation of the Americas is currently creating an award to honor his passion in teaching, and life, in music.
