= Danses concertantes =

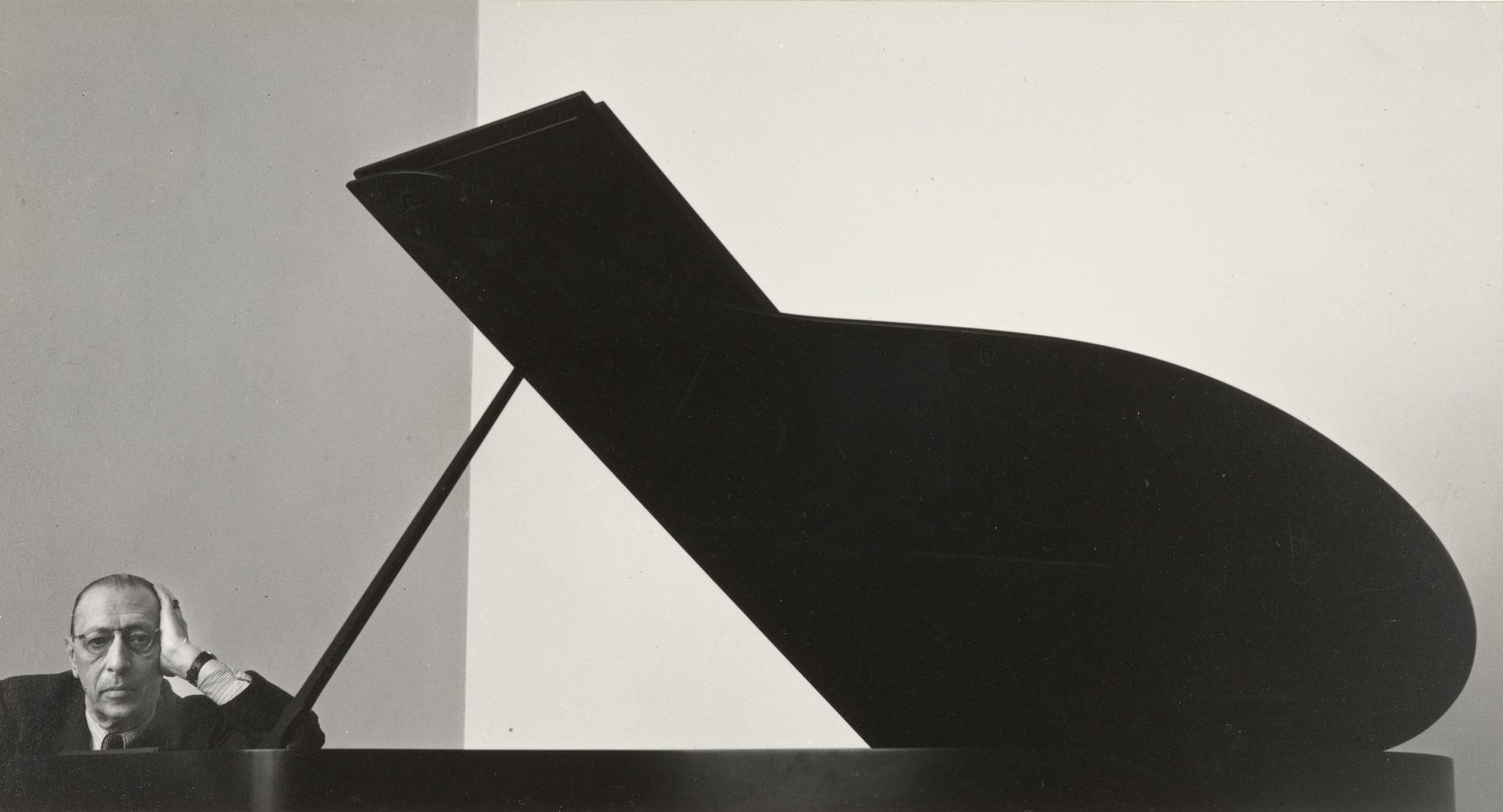
Photograph of Igor Stravinsky by Arnold Newman

Danses concertantes is the title of a work for chamber orchestra written in 1941–42 by Igor Stravinsky, commissioned by Werner Janssen. Stravinsky's music has been used for eponymous ballets by numerous choreographers attracted by its danceability.

== Balanchine versions ==
The title of Stravinsky's orchestral work makes clear his intention that it be used for dance performance. George Balanchine (1904–1983), his friend and colleague, took him at his word, creating two versions of a ballet set to his music: one for the Ballet Russe de Monte-Carlo in 1944 and one for the New York City Ballet in 1972.

=== 1944 version ===
Balanchine choreographed Danses concertantes as his first new work for the Ballet Russe de Monte-Carlo at the beginning of his two-year association with that company as choreographer. He began work on it in early summer of 1944, while the company was performing in Song of Norway, an operetta for which he had created dances and a ballet, in Los Angeles and San Francisco. With scenery and costumes designed by Eugene Berman, Danses concertantes had its premiere on 10 September 1944 at New York's City Center of Music and Drama, with Robert Balaban as conductor. The cast was headed by Alexandra Danilova and Frederic Franklin, the brilliant and popular stars of the company. An effervescent work, it began and ended with parades. "Between them," one observer wrote, "came several rhythmically quirky pas de trois for company soloists and a demanding pas de deux for Danilova and Franklin. The fourth variation was danced by Maria Tallchief, Nicholas Magallanes. and Mary Ellen Moylan. Critical reception was mixed. John Martin, an advocate of modern dance, pronounced it "a clever, somewhat mathematical job of choreography, almost totally devoid of dancing." An opposing view was put forth by Edwin Denby, a balletomane, who praised the "joyousness" of the piece.

=== 1972 version ===
Almost three decades later, Balanchine re-choreographed Danses concertantes for the New York City Ballet's Stravinsky Festival in 1972. The original designs for sets and costumes by Eugene Berman were re-created, and the structure of the piece was much the same, with beginning and ending parades, a sequence of pas de trois, and a pas de deux. The choreography was, however, largely different from the original, although it was similar in its neoclassical style. Only the fourth variation was similar in structure to the original pas de trois. The cast included Linda Yourth and John Clifford in the principal roles, supported by an ensemble of eight women and four men. The premiere was held on 20 June 1972 at the New York State Theater at Lincoln Center. Robert Irving conducted the orchestra. One critic noted that the legendary reputation of the 1944 work "promised somewhat more than [the 1972 work] delivered. Effects were made, but they quickly evaporated, generating a feeling of unease or inconclusiveness." A videorecording of a performance on 4 May 1989 by the New York City Ballet, with Darci Kistler and Robert LaFosse in the leading roles, is available in the Jerome Robbins Dance Division of the New York Public Library for the Performing Arts.

== MacMillan version ==
Kenneth MacMillan (1929–1992) created his version of Danses concertantes in 1955 for the Sadler's Wells Theatre Ballet in London. It was his first major work, his first for the Sadler's Wells company, and his first (of an eventual seven) set to a Stravinsky score. With its bright, carnavalesque décor by Nicholas Georgiadis, then still a student at the Slade School, it had its premiere on 18 January 1955 at the Sadler's Wells Theatre in London. John Lanchbery conducted the orchestra. The cast included Maryon Lane and Donald Britton in the principal roles, supported by David Poole, Sara Neil, Gilbert Vernon, Annette Page, Donald MacLeary, and Bryan Lawrence. Macmillan's choreography for the suite of dances is sharp and spiky, with pointed fingers, angled ports de bras, and sudden changes of direction. "There is a bustling general dance full of entrances and exits for the company, a pas de trois, a rumbustious solo for a male dancer, an adagio for the ballerina and five cavaliers, and a pas de deux. . . . [It is] fast, fleet, and contemporary, with hints of jive, revue, cinema, and the circus." It was an immediate success. Clement Crisp wrote of the first night's performance, "I still recall how the eye was teased by the sparks of energy and wild originality given off by the movement, how the Georgiadis designs flowed and flashed, how bright-footed the young cast seemed." Ninette de Valois, artistic director of Sadler's Wells Ballet, was also favorably impressed, as she quickly took MacMillan's ballet into the repertory of the main company at the Royal Opera House, Covent Garden.

== Christensen version ==
A few years later, Lew Christensen (1909–1984) created his version of Danses concertantes for the San Francisco Ballet. With scenery and costumes designed by Tony Duquette, it had its premiere on 13 October 1959 at the War Memorial Opera House and was warmly received by critics and the public. Debra Sowell noted that "it was a ballet within a ballet in which the dancers represented both performers and the audience." and Jack Anderson later observed that Christensen had "let viewers decide for themselves whether the slight plotline was just a pretext for dancing or a more pointed comment on the 'shows' that socialites often put on at opera openings." Christensen's original cast of twenty-two included Nancy Johnson, Roderick Drew, Sally Bailey, Kent Stowell, Jocelyn Vollmar, Richard Carter, Virginia Johnson, Michael Smuin, Fiona Fuerstner, and Julien Harris. With a later cast, including Attila Ficzere, Vane Vest, Damara Bennett, Roberta Pfeil, Betsy Erickson, and John McFall, it was filmed for archival purposes on 29 March 1976 at the War Memorial Opera House in San Francisco; the videorecording can be viewed at the Jerome Robbins Dance Division of the New York Public Library for the Performing Arts.

== Other versions ==
Basic information on all works listed here can be found in the database of dances set to Stravinsky's music compiled by Stephanie Jordan and Larraine Nichols and mounted on the website of the University of Roehampton, London.

- Job Sanders (1929–2008), a Dutch choreographer, created his version of Danses concertantes in 1964 for the Nederlands Dans Theater in The Hague. With designs by Anne Hyde, it had its first performance on 26 May 1964.
- Todd Bolender (1914–2004) created his version in 1964 for the ballet company of the Būhnen der Stadt Köln (Cologne Ballet) in Germany. With costumes by Ed Wittstein and a cast led by Ute Reusch, Hans Kressing, Petra Troitzsch, and Riccardo Duse, it was first performed on 9 July 1964 at the Opernhaus in Cologne.
- Félix Blaska (born 1941), a Polish-French choreographer, created his version in 1968 for the newly formed Ballet-Théâtre Contemporaine in Amiens, France. With designs by Sonia Delaunay, it was first performed on 4 December 1968. It was carried over to the repertory of Les Ballets de Félix Blaska in 1969.
- Leonid Yakobson (1904–1975) created his version in 1971 for his company, Choreographic Miniatures, in Leningrad, Russia.
- John Taras (1919–2004) created his version in 1971 for the Deutsche Oper Berlin. With designs by Georges Wakhévitch and with Didi Carli and Klaus Beelitz in the principal roles, it was first performed on 1 December 1971. It was set for a leading couple, three trios, and an accompanying group of six dancers.
- Fernand Nault (1920–2006), French Canadian, created his version in 1972 for Les Grands Ballets Canadiens in Montréal, Québec. With Sonia Taverner and Vincent Warren heading a cast of eight dancers, it was first performed in Théâtre Maisonneuve at Place des Arts. A lighthearted work, it was revived for the Colorado Concert Ballet in 1977.
- Leslie White (1936–2009), an Australian choreographer, created his version for the Queensland Ballet in 1978. Under the title A Little of What You Fancy, it was first performed on 6 September 1978 at the SG10 Theatre in Brisbane.
- Nils Christe (born 1949), a Dutch choreographer, created his version in the early 1990s for the Scapino Ballet in Rotterdam. With designs by Keso Dekker, it was a plotless work in neoclassical style. It was revived in Helsinki in 1989.
- Giuseppi Urbani (1928–2007), an Italian choreographer, created his version in 1987 for the Compagnia Artedanza in Rome. It was first performed in September 1987 at the Teatro La Cometa in Rome.
- Michael Corder (born 1955), a British choreographer, created his version in 1993 for the Hong Kong Ballet and restaged it in 2000 for the Boston Ballet.
- Mark Baldwin (born 1954), a British choreographer, created his version in 1998 for the Cisne Negro Cia de Dança in São Paulo, Brazil. Choreographed for thirteen dancers, it was revived for Images of Dance in 2000 and for the Mark Baldwin Dance Company in 2001.
