= Annette av Paul =

Swedish-Canadian ballet dancer

Annette av Paul OC
- Born: February 11, 1944 (age 82); Stockholm, Sweden

Annette av Paul OC (born February 11, 1944) is a Swedish-Canadian ballet dancer who had a 30-year dance career performing, teaching, and directing companies across Canada. Av Paul was born in Rönninge, Sweden, about 30 kilometres outside Stockholm on February 11, 1944. Her mother was a dance and piano teacher and her father an artist and writer. She studied at the Royal Swedish Ballet School and in 1962, at the age of 17, was apprenticed to the company, becoming principal dancer in 1966.

It was there that she met her husband, Canadian dancer/choreographer Brian Macdonald, who was director of the Royal Swedish Ballet at the time. They moved to Canada in 1973 and Macdonald became artistic director of Les Grands Ballets Canadiens from 1974 to 1977, and resident choreographer there from 1977 to 1990. She danced with Les Grands for 14 years, retiring in 1984.

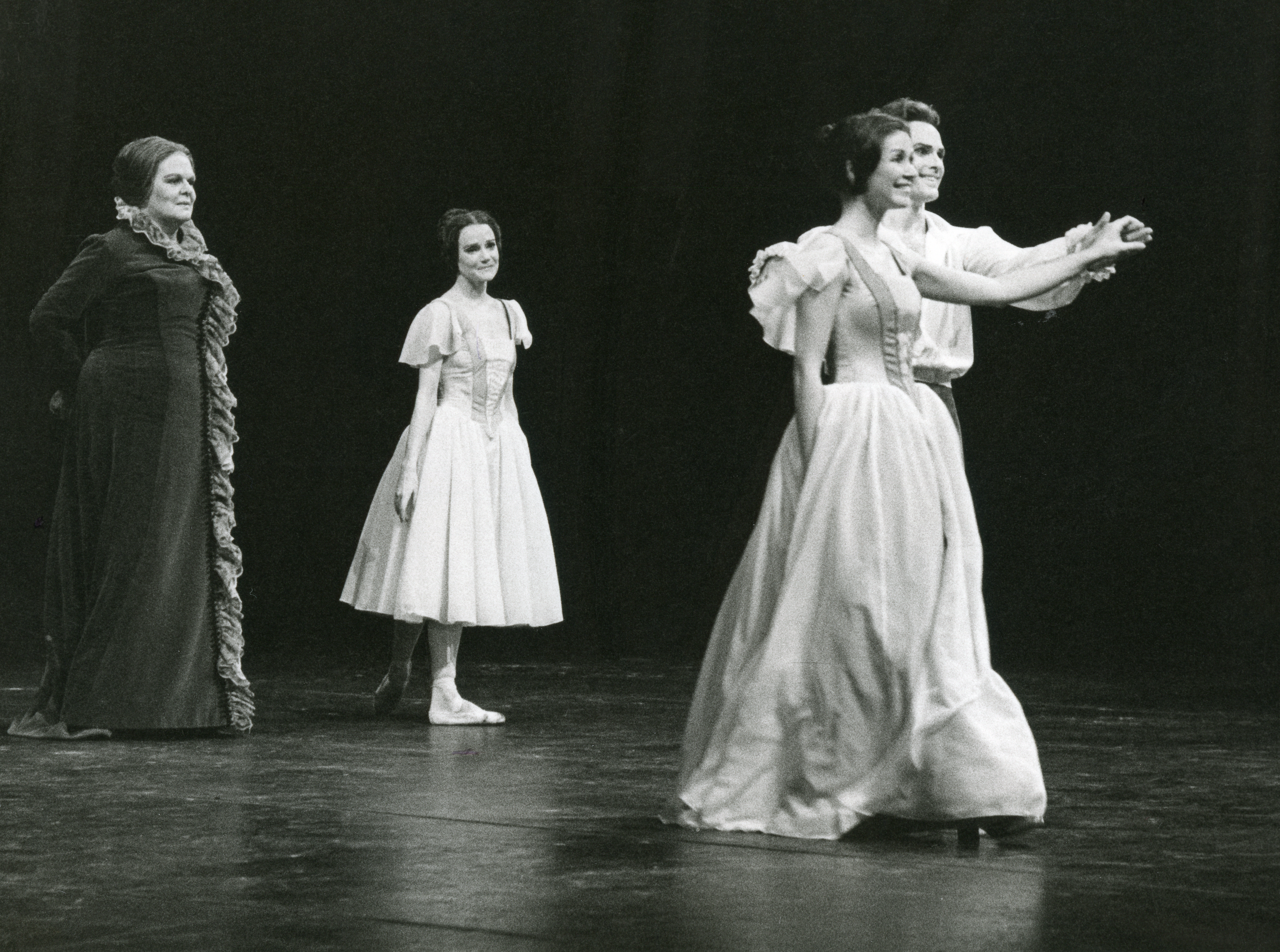
On the set of Les Grands Ballets Canadiens' performance of 'Adieu Robert Schumann (1979)' by R. Murray Schafer and Brian MacDonald, with Maureen Forrester (left) and Vincent Warren and Denise Massé (right).

Following retirement Av Paul was a guest performer and coach at many Canadian and international dance companies, including the National Ballet of Canada, the Royal Winnipeg Ballet, Les Ballets Jazz de Montreal, Royal Swedish Ballet, the Gothenburg Ballet Company and Canada's National Ballet School. She was founding artistic director of Ballet BC from 1985 to 1988.

Av Paul became associate program head of the Banff Centre for the Arts in Alberta, where she taught in the professional and dance training programs and is currently a coach with the Birmingham Conservatory at the Stratford Festival.
