= Stijn Celis =

Choreographer, set designer

Stijn Celis is a Belgian choreographer and set designer. He danced in companies such as the Royal Ballet of Flanders, the Zürich Ballet, Contemporary Dance Zurich, Le Ballet du Grand Théâtre in Geneva and the Cullberg Ballet. In a survey of critics, the German magazine "ballett international / tanz aktuell" named him "most promising young choreographer" in 2001. From 2004 to 2007, he was director of the Bern Ballet; he worked as a freelance choreographer until 2014 when he took over as ballet director of the Saarländisches Staatstheater.

He has created work for Les Grands Ballets Canadiens, the Cullberg Ballet, Cedar Lake Contemporary Ballet, Nederlands Dans Theater II, Iceland Dance Company, the Dresden Semperoper Ballett, ballettmainz, the Stadttheater Nürnberg, the Stadttheater St. Gallen, IT Dansa, GöteborgsOperan Danskompani, Bodytraffic, aalto ballet essen, Ballet Junior Geneva, Royal Swedish Ballet, Introdans, among others. He has worked as a set designer for Didy Veldman and has assisted Jan Verzweyveld, Benoit Dujardin in opera and theatre productions.

His works include "Geschwinde ihr wirbelnden winde", "Geflügeltes Gelb", "Cinderella", "Undine", "Magnolia", "Fragile Dwellings", "Le Sacre de printemps," "Hidden Garden," "Practice Paradise", "Vertigo Maze", "Devant l'arrière pays", "The Lost Shoe", "Gefährliche Liebschaften", "Sonata", "Sore Core", "Skulls and Bees", "Swan Lake", "Firebird Suite", "Your Passion is Pure Joy to me", "Les Noces", "Looming Sky", "Anima", "Black Cold Burns" and "Mass in C-minor", "Peer Gynt" for the Saarbrücker Ballet as well as "Romeo und Julia" and "Josephslegende" for the Semperoper Ballett.
