= Sonia Taverner =

- Born: 18 May 1936; Byfleet, Surrey, England
- Died: 10 February 2018 (aged 81); Stony Plain, Alberta, Canada
- Occupation: Ballet dancer

Sonia Taverner (18 May 1936 – 10 February 2018) was an English-born Canadian ballet dancer. She danced with the corps of the Sadler's Wells Ballet for 18 months and moved to Canada in 1956 and joined the Royal Winnipeg Ballet from 1956 to 1966. Taverner moved on to join the Les Grands Ballets Canadiens and performed with the company between 1966 and 1974, when she retired as the company's principal dancer. She taught at the Performing Arts faculty at Grant MacEwan Community College in Edmonton, Alberta from 1975 to 1980 and then ran her own dance school in Edmonton from 1980.

== Early life ==
Taverner was born in Byfleet, Surrey, England on 18 May 1936. She was the daughter of H. J. Taverner. When she was 12, Taverner took an interest in classical music, and started her dance studies in the weekly ballet classes of a local teacher. She started to take a serious interest in studying the art of ballet at age 14, and enrolled at the Elmhurst Ballet School on a scholarship when she was 15. The school offered a curriculum of academic courses combined with a fine arts programme. Taverner won the 1954 Dame Adeline Genée silver medal for the most promising student. Aged 17, she earned a second scholarship to attend the Senior School of the Sadler's Wells Ballet, London, where she continued her training under the instructor Winifred Edwards.

== Career ==
In early 1955, Taverner joined and danced with the corps of the Sadler's Wells Ballet. She stayed with the company for 18 months, encompassing a single season that included a tour of Canada and the United States. With the choice of staying with the ballet corps for a decade hoping to get leading roles, Taverner was apprehensive about her opportunities of progressing in the large company, so she convinced her family to emigrate to Canada in order to join the ballet in 1956 following a suggestion by a colleague. That same year, she joined Gweneth Lloyd's newly established Royal Winnipeg Ballet, which was Canada's sole national ballet company at the time, and some she came to admire on her Canadian and American tour.

Taverner was promoted to be one of three women dancers for the 1957–58 season. Among her first roles were leads in two early works by Brian Macdonald, Aimez-vous Bach? and Pas d'Action, which she created. Other works in which she danced leading roles were Heino Heiden's Chinese Nightingale, Lloyd's Concerto and George Balanchine's Romance, Pas de Dix, and numerous pas de deux from the classical ballet repertory such as the Black Swan in Pyotr Ilyich Tchaikovsky's Swan Lake, and Aida, being regularly paired with Fredric Strobe, across Jamaica, North America, Puerto Rico, Scotland, Wales, England. and as a representative of Canada at the Commonwealth Arts Festival, London. She was a guest performer for the Boston Ballet Company, the National Arts Centre, Ottawa, the Toronto Symphony Orchestra, Vancouver Symphony Orchestra, the Vancouver Opera and the Winnipeg Symphony Orchestra. In 1962, Taverner earned a Canada Council grant to continue her studying at the School of American Ballet, New York as well as the American Ballet Theatre School and the Ballet Arts School. She taught dancing at the Royal Winnipeg Ballet, Nelson School of Fine Arts Summer School, British Columbia, Kamloops Summer School of Fine Arts, Newark State College, New Jersey, the Hanya Holm School, New York, and the Okanagan Summer School of the Arts, Penticton.

She was prima ballerina from 1962 to 1966. With aspirations to dance in full-length classical productions and attracted by the varied repertory of Les Grands Ballets Canadiens, Taverner relocated to Montreal in 1965 and joined the company led by Ludmilla Chiriaeff and Fernand Nault. She performed in productions of Giselle, The Nutcracker, La fille mal gardée, Nault's Pas Rompu, Divertissement Glazounov, Cérémonie, George Balanchine's Theme and Variations and Allegro Brillante, Norman Walker's Trionfo di Afrodite, and the rock opera Tommy. She was frequently paired with Richard Beaty in classical and neoclassical works, and went to Paris in late 1970 to study with Raymond Franchetti on a Canada Council grant. In August 1971, following six years with Les Grands Ballets Canadiens, Taverner joined the Pennsylvania Ballet as principal dancer for the 1971–72 season, performing in Balanchine's Symphony in C and Raymonda Variations (which was her debut performance with the company) and as the Innocent Girl in John Butler's Villon.

Returning to Canada, Taverner appeared with the newly formed Festival Ballet of Ottawa, dancing in Brydon Paige's ballet Songs for a Dark Voice, and once again with Les Grands Ballets Canadiens. In February 1974, she was partnered by Vincent Warren and gave a series of performances of Giselle. Later in the year, Taverner retired as principal dancer of Les Grands Ballet Canadiens, and moved to Western Canada. In August 1975, while adjudicating sessions by the Royal Academy of Dance, she was invited to lead the Performing Arts faculty at Grant MacEwan Community College in Edmonton, Alberta and its two-year dance program, citing the need of a lifestyle change to examine an academic perspective of teaching. Taverner took a low profile, and for the following five years, she taught classes, staged performances and appeared as occasional guest artist with the Alberta Ballet Company and Les Grands Ballets Canadiens. She taught at her own school close to Edmonton from 1980, as well as at the Edmonton Dance Factory.

== Personal life ==
Taverner was a member of the Royal Academy of Dancing, the Actors' Equity Association and the American Guild of Musical Artists. She died in Stony Plain, Alberta on 10 February 2018.
