= Gina Tse =

English ballerina

Gina Tse (born 1979) is an English ballerina of British-Chinese descent, and first soloist of the Royal Swedish Ballet. Beginning in the 2012–2013 season, she was elevated to the principal dancer of the company.

== Biography ==
Gina Tse was born in 1979 in Leeds, England to a British and Chinese couple. She began ballet classes at age two and a half and earned a full scholarship at the Royal Ballet School in Richmond, London, where she studied from age eight to eighteen. During her last year of schooling a foot injury and surgery hastened a decision to quit dancing. She opted to continue performing in musical theatre and for five years performed in musicals such as The King and I with Elaine Paige and Jason Scott-Lee and The Lion King.

After a five-year hiatus from ballet, Tse auditioned for and won a place in the English National Ballet where she performed for the next 2 years. In 2004, she and her partner moved to Stockholm and Tse secured a position with the Royal Swedish Ballet in 2004 and was promoted to first soloist in 2007, which earned her a lifetime contract at Royal Swedish Opera. She has performed many roles including: as "Gamzatti" in La Bayadere choreographed by Natalia Makarova, "Isolde" in Tristan by choreographer Krzysztof Pastor, "Giovanni Bassi" in Patrice Bart's rendition of Gustav III, in Kazmir's Colours by Mauro Bigonzetti, in Dreamland by Matjash Mrozewski, in Double Concerto with the choreography of Christopher Hampson as "Odette" and "Odile" in Natalie Conus' version of Swan Lake . In addition, she has danced in The selected in the Rite of Spring by choreographer Maurice Béjart, in Before Nightfall by Niels Christe, as "Husan" in The Nutcracker under the choreography of Pär Isberg, as the mother in Juliet & Romeo by Mats Ek, as "Aurora" in Marcia Haydée's version of Sleeping Beauty and in Mozart's Mass in C minor with choreography by Stijn Celis. Odette/Odile in Matz Ek Swan Lake “Tyll”” and” Midsommar Nights Dream” by Alexander Ekman Tatiana in Onegin by Cranko

2011 Tse was awarded the Mariano Orlando “ Dancer of the year award” 2015 Tse was a nominee for “Benois de la Danse” for her role Odette/Odile In Matz Ek Swan Lake

In the 2012 to 2013 season, Tse was promoted to the position of principal ballerina of the Royal Swedish Ballet. In 2014, still the prima ballerina of the company, she has begun teaching dance in Sweden, with her own company Ballet International, having previously taught with In Hong Kong, Cyprus and England.
