= Denise Massé =

Canadian pianist and vocal coach (1946–2022)

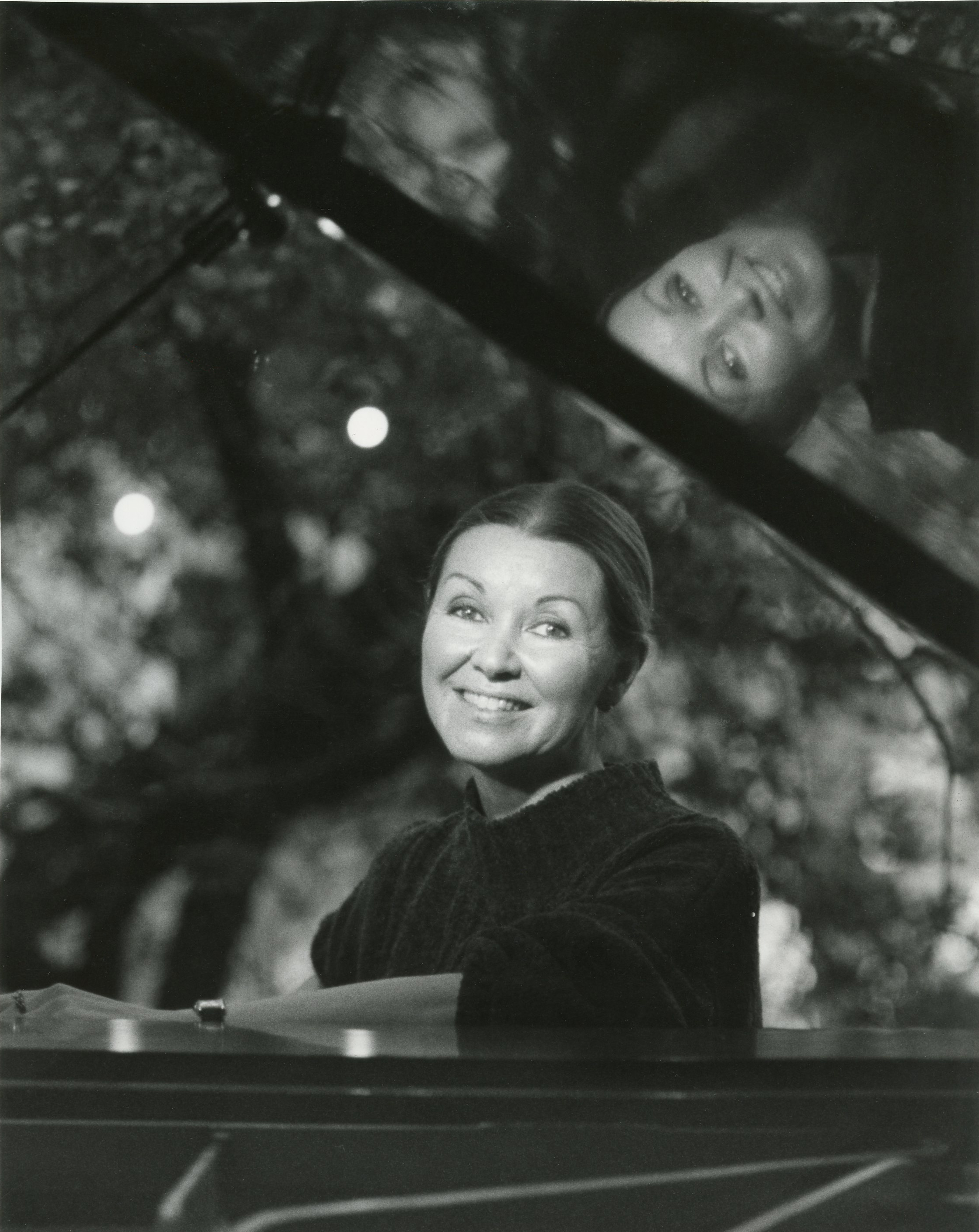
- Born: Denise Marie Massé; April 2, 1946; Montreal, Quebec, Canada
- Died: June 14, 2022 (aged 76); Montreal, Quebec, Canada
- Resting place: Cimetière de Saint-Éloi, Quebec, Canada
- Occupations: Pianist and vocal coach
- Years active: 1969–2018
- Known for: French repertoire
- Spouse: Roland Richard (m. 1969)

Denise Massé (April 2, 1946 – June 14, 2022) was a Canadian musician and recording artist. Trained as a concert pianist, she was best known for her work as a repertory pianist and an as operatic coach. Along with Janine Reiss, she was considered one of the greatest coaches of French repertoire of her era.

Among notable recordings, Denise Massé collaborated on the 1995 Grammy Winner for Best Opera Recording (Berlioz Les Troyens, OSM/Dutoit) with Deborah Voigt, on 'The Art of Susan Graham' (2010), and the album, Placido Domingo 'Songs' (2012). She was inducted into the Canadian Opera Hall of Fame in 2013.

== Biography ==
Denise Massé was born on April 2, 1946, in Montreal (Quebec, Canada). She spent her childhood in Drummondville before moving back to Montreal to study as a pianist, where she received her bachelor of music from the École Vincent-d'Indy (1966) and her Master's in musical interpretation at the Université de Montréal (1969). During this time, Denise Massé performed as a soloist and accompanist, including concerts at Expo 67's Youth Pavilion.

After receiving a number of regional awards for piano throughout the 1960s, Denise Massé received high praise at the 1968 Festival de musique du Québec from judges Wilfred Pelletier—"Technique et musicalité remarquables. Excellente pianiste, sensibilité de premier ordre" and John Brownlee—"An amazing talent. A terrific technique, strong and flexible. She makes this difficult concerto sound almost easy. An extraordinary musician, and what a performance". Upon further receiving a bursary from the Ministère de l'Éducation (Québec), Denise Massé went on to study piano and accompaniment for the next three years with Dieter Weber and Erik Werba in Vienna, and with Gerald Moore in London.

Denise Massé returned to Canada, recorded many performances on Canadian broadcasting, and toured extensively with Jeunesses Musicales Canada accompanying her spouse, the opera singer Roland Richard. From her early interest in opera, Denise Massé continued on as repertory pianist at Ottawa University, Orford Musique, and the National Arts Center, working with Mario Bernardi. At the inception of the Opéra de Montréal in 1980, she became their principal repertory pianist until 1993.

In 1994, Denise Massé began working at the Metropolitan Opera under music directors James Levine and Yannick Nézet-Séguin, and shortly afterwards became a Vocal Arts faculty member at the Juilliard School (1998-2018) in New York City.

As an accompanist or vocal coach for many artists throughout the years, including Maya Plisetskaya, Vincent Warren, and singers Lorraine Hunt Lieberson, Cecilia Bartoli, and Renée Fleming among others; Denise Massé also worked with young singers of the MET's Lindemann Young Artist Development Program (2012-2018), taught at the Curtis Institute (2006-2012) in Philadelphia, and was involved in programs at Ravinia's Steans Music Institute in Chicago, the Music Academy of the West in Santa Barbara, the Internationale Meistersinger Akademie in Germany, the Sociedad Internacional de Valores de Arte Mexicano (SIVAM), as well as the Canadian Vocal Art Institute in Montreal, and other similar programs.

Denise Massé retired in 2018 and returned to Montreal. She died of a stroke on June 14, 2022, after suffering from dementia. Stage director Fabrizio Melano dedicated his production of Charles Gounod’s Faust at the Savannah Voice Festival in memoriam. The Performing Arts Foundation of the Americas is currently creating an award to honor her passion in teaching, and life, in music.

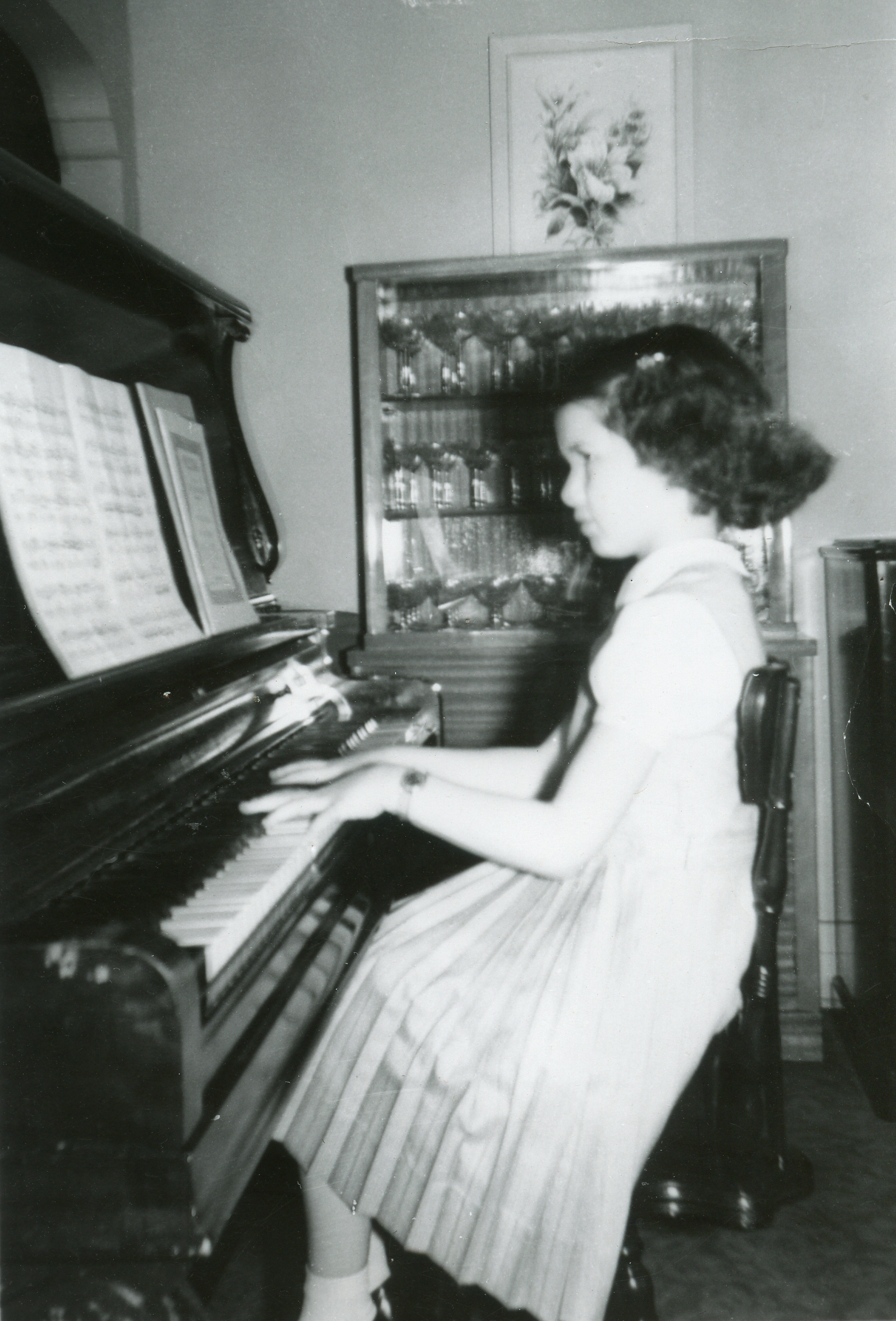
Practicing in Drummondville where she spent her childhood (c. 1952)

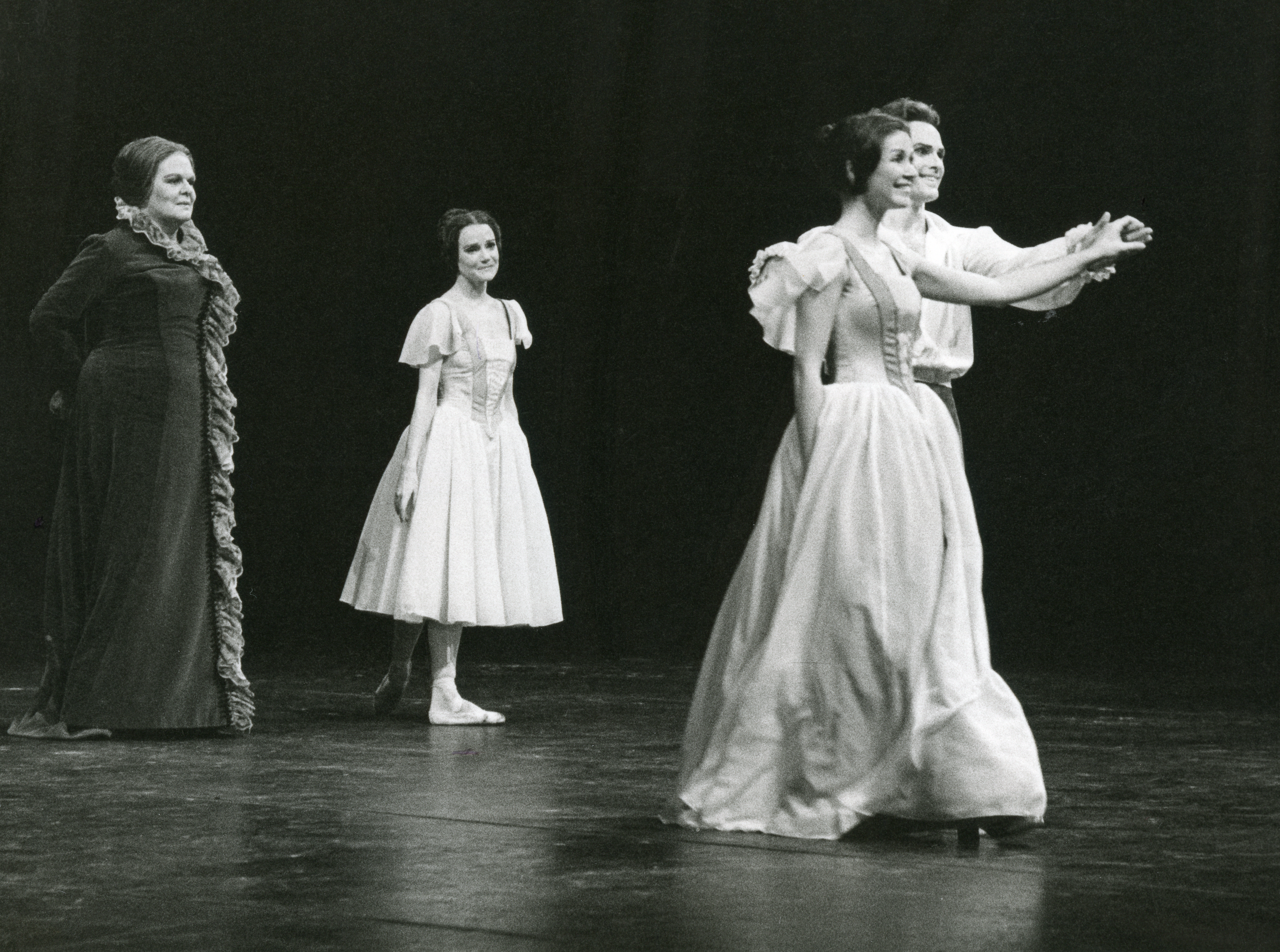
On the set of Les Grands Ballets Canadiens' performance of 'Adieu Robert Schumann' (1979) by R.M. Schafer and choreographed by Brian MacDonald, with (left to right) Maureen Forrester, Annette av Paul, and Vincent Warren

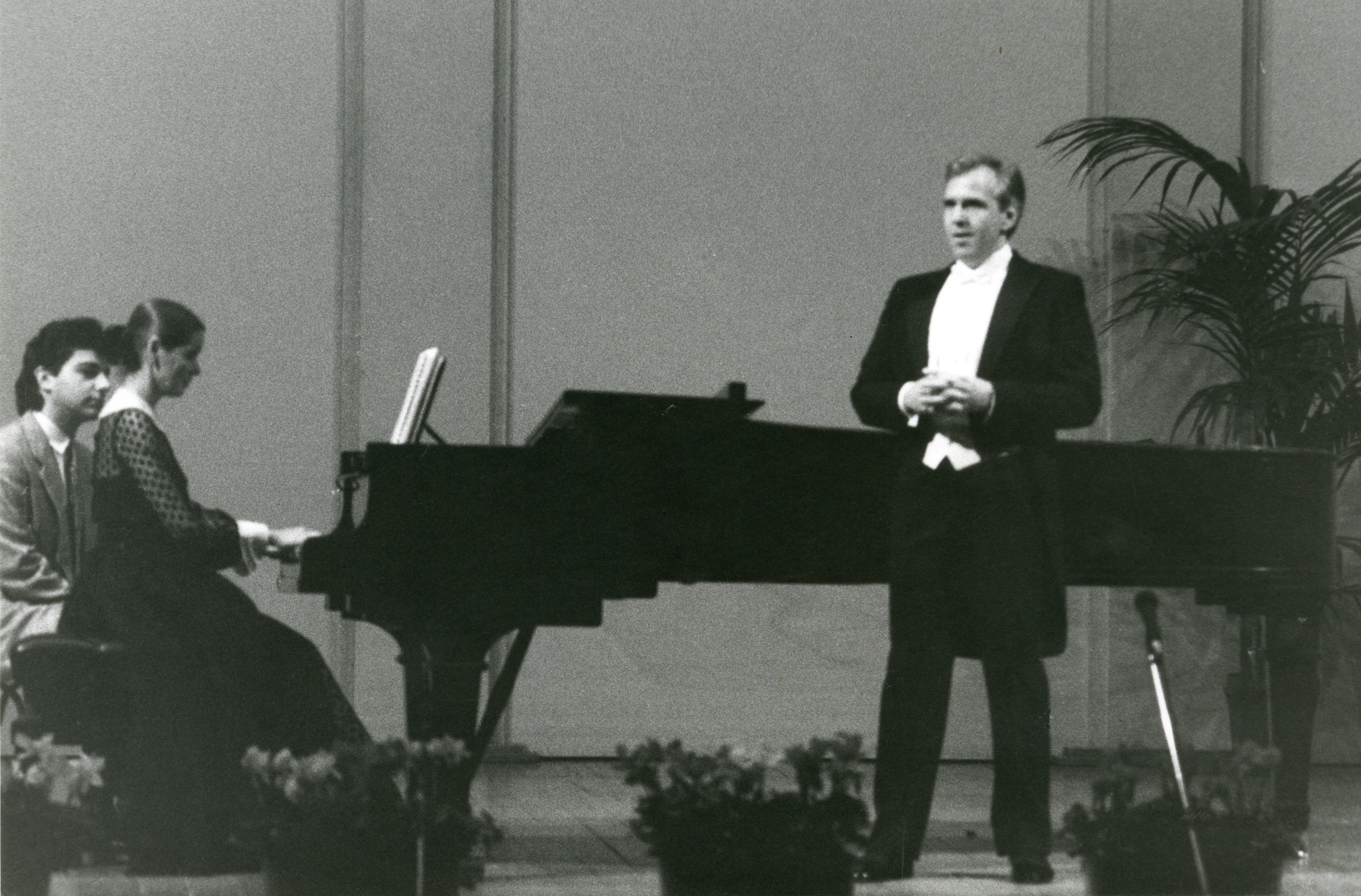
Accompanying Rockwell Blake at the Teatro Storchi, Modena (1988) and La Scala, Milan (1996).

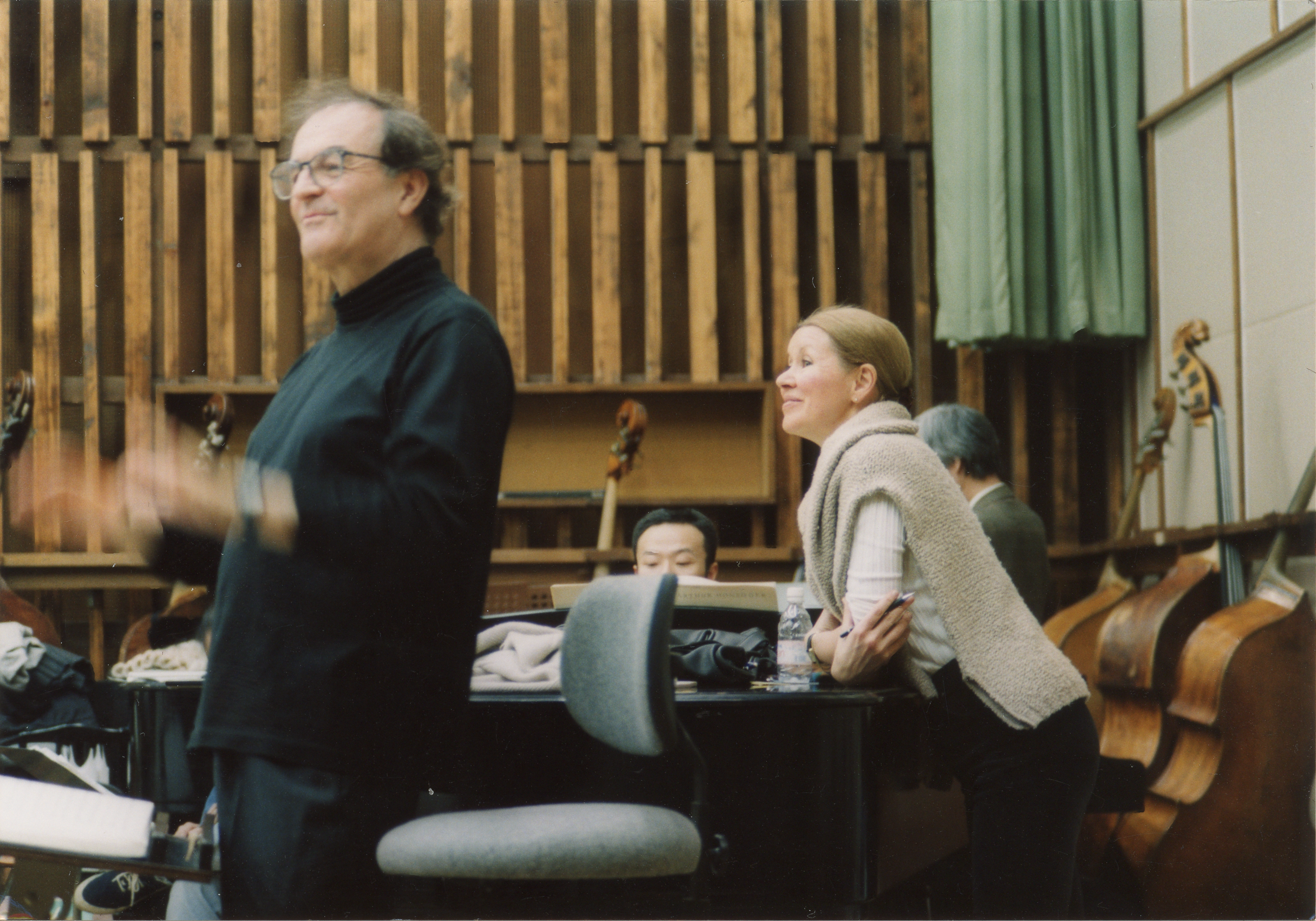
Rehearsals with the NHK Symphony Orchestra and Charles Dutoit for Jeanne d'Arc au bûcher (Honnegger), Tokyo (2009)
