= Iro Tembeck =

Canadian dancer, choreographer, and dance historian

Iro Tembeck (1946–2004) was a Canadian dancer, choreographer, and dance historian. After emigrating to Montreal in 1967, she taught at the academy of Les Grands Ballets Canadiens, and danced with Le Groupe Nouvelle Aire in the early 1970s. She founded Axis Danse with Christina Coleman in 1977, and in 1980, Tembeck became a professor in the Dance Department at Université du Québec à Montréal, where she also co-founded the choreographic research group Artscene. Tembeck signed over 40 choreographic works, which were produced with Le Groupe Nouvelle Aire (L'Attente, 1976; Howl, 1976; Incubus, 1977), Axis Danse (amongst them, Terracotta, 1980; Amazonie, 1983; Kyklos, 1983), Les Ballets Jazz de Montréal (Germinal, 1984; Numbers, 1987), and Les Ballets Eddy Toussaint (Cool Heure Blues, 1988).

Tembeck's academic research investigated the roots of contemporary Quebec dance. Her book Dancing in Montreal: Seeds of a Choreographic History, originally published in French in 1991, was the first to retrace the twentieth-century history of dance in Montreal. It was named "Outstanding Publication in Dance Research" by the Congress on Research in Dance in 1996. Described as "a force in researching and recording dance history," Tembeck was considered "one of the foremost experts in the field." Her publications are used as textbooks for courses on the history of dance in Quebec.

== Bibliography ==
- Iro Tembeck (1991). Danser à Montréal: Germination d'une histoire chorégraphique. Presses de l'Université du Québec, Sillery. ISBN 2-7605-0659-2
- Iro Tembeck (1994). Dancing in Montreal: Seeds of a Choreographic History. University of Wisconsin Press, Madison.
- Iro Valaskakis Tembeck (2001). La Danse comme paysage: Sources, traditions, innovations. Presses de l'Université Laval. ISBN 2-89224-325-4
- Iro Valaskakis Tembeck, ed. (2002). Estivale 2000 Canadian Dancing Bodies Then and Now/Les Corps dansants d'hier à aujourd'hui au Canada. Dance Collection Danse Press/es, Toronto. ISBN 0-929003-50-0
