= Danses concertantes (Stravinsky) =

1942 composition by Igor Stravinsky

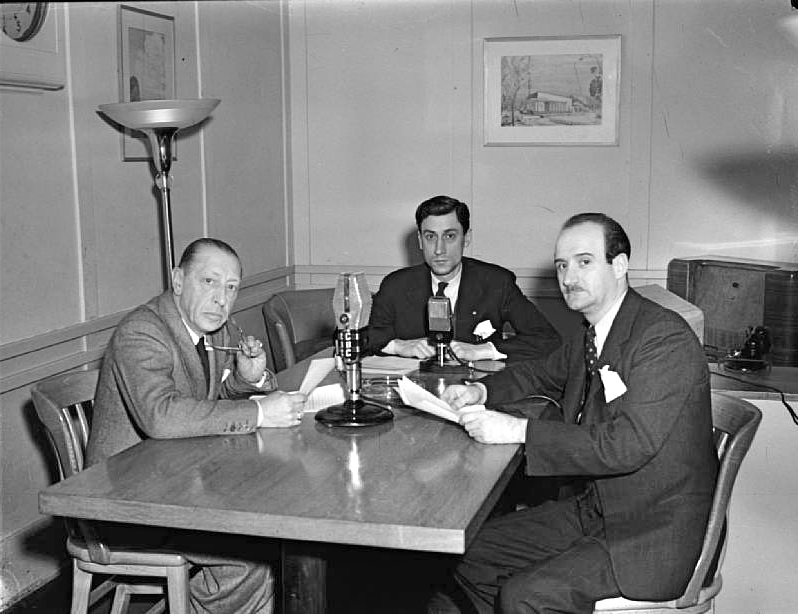
Igor Stravinsky (left) in 1945

Danses concertantes is a work for chamber orchestra by Igor Stravinsky, composed in 1942. A performance lasts about twenty minutes. Although written as an abstract ballet for concert performance, it has been choreographed numerous times.

== History ==
Danses concertantes was commissioned by the Werner Janssen Orchestra of Los Angeles, and was intended not for the stage but for concert performance. Stravinsky nevertheless cast it in the form of an abstract ballet, completing the score on 13 January 1942. It was published later that year by Associate Music Publishers in New York.

Stravinsky conducted the first performance, with the Werner Janssen Orchestra, in Los Angeles on 8 February 1942. The French premiere, in February 1945 on the second of an extended series of concerts devoted to Stravinsky's work, was met by vocal protests from a group of students from Olivier Messiaen's class, including Serge Nigg and Pierre Boulez, who found Stravinsky's neoclassicism intolerably old-fashioned. Although this has been interpreted as a championing of postwar serialism, in fact it was Messiaen's music that fired the young composers' imagination, not Schoenberg's twelve-tone technique.

== Instrumentation ==
Danses concertantes is for a chamber orchestra consisting of flute, oboe, clarinet, bassoon, two horns, trumpet, trombone, timpani, and a string section specified as six violins, four violas, three cellos, and two double basses.

== Analysis ==
The work is divided into five movements:

1. Marche – introduction
2. Pas d'action – Con moto
3. Thème varié – Lento
  1. Variation 1: Allegretto
  2. Variation 2: Scherzando
  3. Variation 3: Andantino
  4. Variation 4 (Coda): Tempo giusto
4. Pas de deux – Risoluto – Andante sostenuto
5. Marche – conclusion

The music is closely related to several of Stravinsky's immediately preceding works. The variations of the third movement, for example, follow a plan of ascending semitones: theme in G, and four variations in A♭, A, A again, and B♭. This is the reverse of the variations in Jeu de cartes (1937), which are arranged in a chromatic descent. The concertante style strongly resembles the Dumbarton Oaks Concerto (1938), and the thematic material, particularly the opening of the second movement, recalls the Symphony in C (1939).

== Ballet productions ==
George Balanchine choreographed Danses concertantes for a 1944 production by the Ballet Russe de Monte-Carlo, with sets and costumes by Eugène Berman. A second choreography was created by Kenneth MacMillan in 1955 for the Sadler's Wells Theatre Ballet in London, with scenery and costumes by Nicholas Georgiadis. A third ballet production was created in 1959 for the San Francisco Ballet, with choreography by Lew Christensen and designs by Tony Duquette. Since then, numerous other choreographers have set dances to Stravinsky's score.
