= Maureen Forrester =

Canadian operatic contralto (1930–2010)

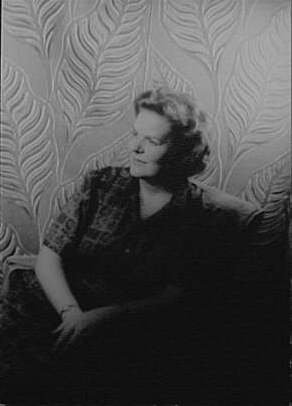
- A photo of Forrester taken by Carl Van Vechten
- Born: Maureen Kathleen Stewart Forrester; July 25, 1930; Montreal, Quebec, Canada
- Died: June 16, 2010 (aged 79); Toronto, Ontario, Canada
- Occupation: Singer
- Years active: 1953–1983
- Spouse: Eugene Kash (m. 1957; div. 1974)
- Children: 5, including Linda and Daniel

Maureen Kathleen Stewart Forrester CC OQ (July 25, 1930 – June 16, 2010) was a Canadian operatic contralto.

== Life and career ==
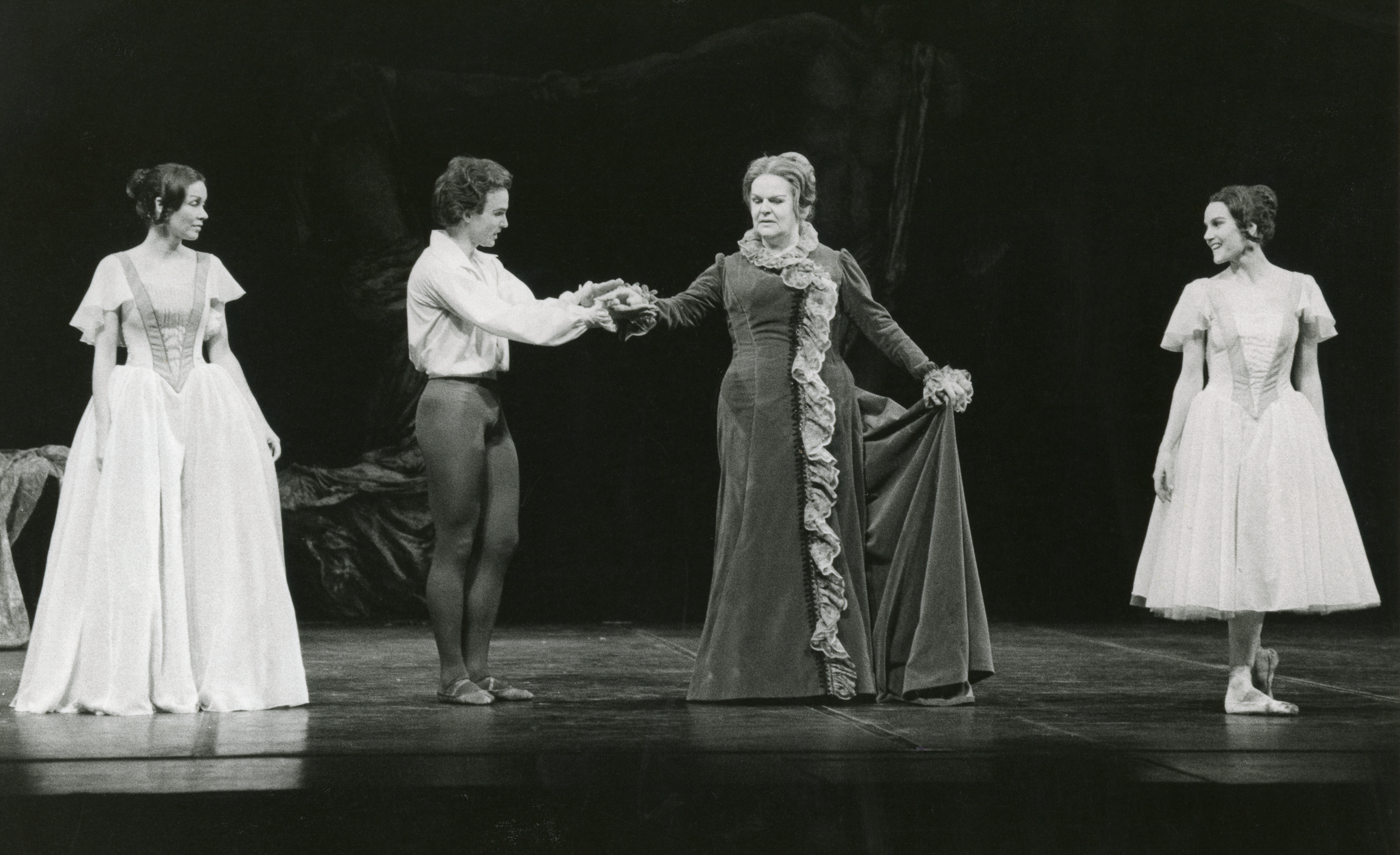
On the set of Les Grands Ballets Canadiens' performance of Adieu Robert Schumann (1979) by R.M. Schafer and choreographed by Brian MacDonald, with (left to right) Denise Massé, Vincent Warren, and Annette av Paul

Maureen Forrester was born and grew up in Montreal, Quebec, one of four children of Thomas Forrester, a British cabinetmaker from Scotland, and his Irish-born wife, the former May Arnold. She sang in church and radio choirs. At age 13, she dropped out of school to help support the family, working as a secretary at Bell Telephone.

When her brother came home from the war he persuaded her to take singing lessons. She paid for voice lessons with Sally Martin, Frank Rowe, and baritone Bernard Diamant. In the spring of 1951, Forrester appeared on the CBC radio talent competition Opportunity Knocks, singing "Ombra mai fu", and describing herself to the host as a "starving musician" and part-time switchboard operator. She was ultimately named first runner-up, and later competed on the similar shows Singing Stars of Tomorrow, and Nos Futures Étoiles.

She gave her debut recital at the local YWCA in 1953. She made her concert debut in Beethoven's Ninth Symphony with the Montreal Symphony Orchestra under Otto Klemperer.

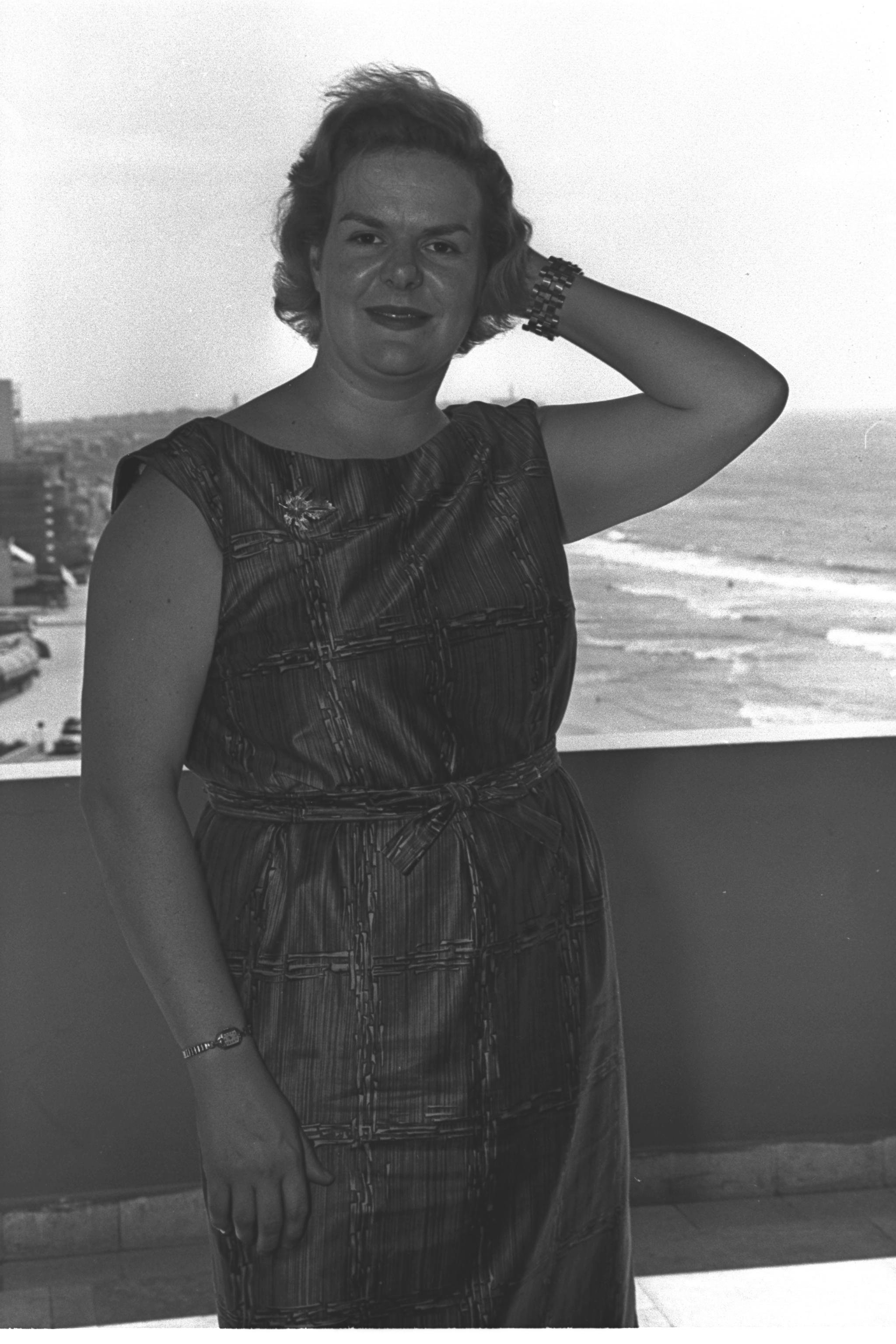
Maureen Forrester, Tel Aviv, 1961

She toured extensively in Canada and Europe with Jeunesses Musicales. She made her New York City debut in Town Hall in 1956. Bruno Walter invited her to sing for him; he was looking for the right contralto for a performance and recording of the Mahler Symphony No. 2 "Resurrection". This was the start of a warm relationship with great rapport. Walter had been a protégé of Mahler, and he trained Forrester in interpretation of his works. She performed at Walter's farewell performances with the New York Philharmonic in 1957.

In 1957, she married the Toronto violinist and conductor Eugene Kash. The couple had five children, including actors Linda Kash and Daniel Kash. Forrester converted to Judaism.

She performed regularly in concert and opera. At the New York City Opera, she sang Cornelia in Handel's Giulio Cesare (1966), opposite Norman Treigle and Beverly Sills, which was recorded by RCA in 1967. She sang at the Metropolitan Opera in New York in 1975 in Das Rheingold (Erda), Siegfried, and Un ballo in maschera. Forrester also provided the voice of the Bianca Castafiore character in the television series The Adventures of Tintin. She was a strong champion of Canadian composers, regularly scheduling their works in her programs, especially when she toured abroad. A notable example is composer Donald Steven, whose work "Pages of Solitary Delights" (winner of the 1987 Juno Award for Classical Composition of the Year) was written for Ms. Forrester. From 1983-88 she served as Chair of the Canada Council.

Forrester taught singing in Toronto. One of her pupils was Dorothy Howard.

In 1986, she co-authored her autobiography, Out of Character (ISBN 0-7710-3228-5), with journalist Marci McDonald.

== Death ==
Maureen Forrester died on June 16, 2010, aged 79, in Toronto, after a long period suffering from dementia. She was predeceased by Eugene Kash, her former husband, whom she had divorced in 1974, and who died in 2004. She was survived by her five children.

== Honours ==
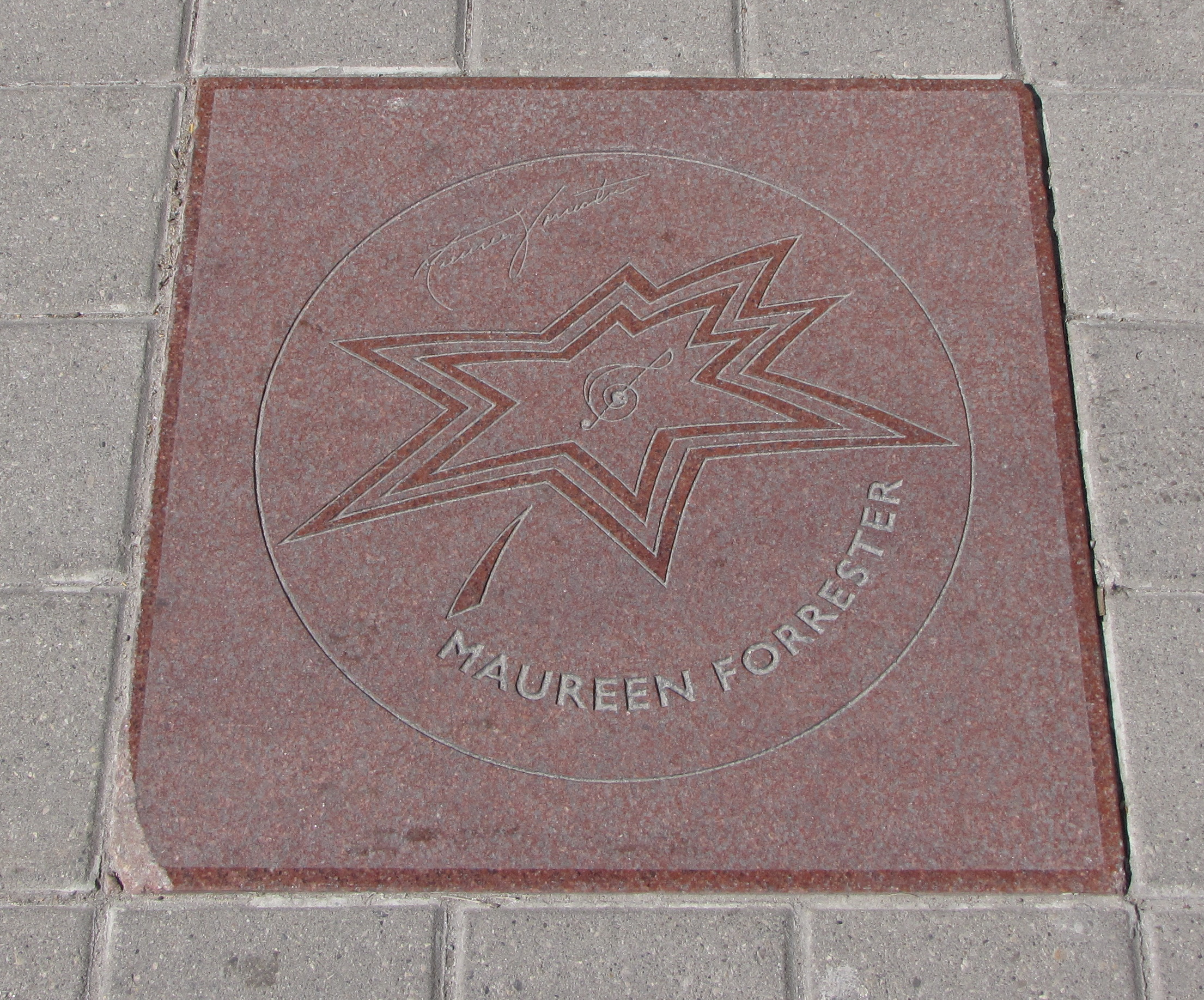
The star dedicated to Forrester, from 2000, on the Canada's Walk of Fame, in Toronto, Ontario

- In 1967, Forrester was made a Companion of the Order of Canada.
- In 1969, Forrester received an honorary doctorate from Sir George Williams University, one of Concordia University's founding institutions.
- On April 8, 1969, Forrester was chosen to sing the Canadian national anthem at the first Montreal Expos regular-season baseball game, at Shea Stadium in New York City.
- In 1979, Forrester received the Loyola Medal from Concordia University.
- In 1980, Forrester received the diplôme d'honneur from the Canadian Conference of the Arts
- In 1983, Forrester was awarded Yale University's Sanford Medal.
- From 1986–90, Maureen Forrester was Chancellor of Wilfrid Laurier University; the University's recital hall is named in her honour.
- In 1990, Forrester was inducted into the Canadian Music Hall of Fame (aka Juno Hall of Fame).
- In 1995, Forrester received a Governor General's Performing Arts Award.
- In 1999, Forrester received the Order of Ontario.
- In 2000, Forrester received a star on Canada's Walk of Fame.
- In 2003, Forrester was made an Officer of the National Order of Quebec.
- In 2004, Forrester became a MasterWorks honouree by the Audio-Visual Preservation Trust of Canada.

== See also ==
- Music of Canada
- Canadian Music Hall of Fame

Academic offices
Preceded by John Black Aird	Chancellor of Wilfrid Laurier University; 1986–1990	Succeeded by Willard Z. Estey
