= Didy Veldman =

Dutch choreographer

Didy Veldman (born 1967, in Groningen) is a Dutch choreographer. She trained at the Scapino Academy in Amsterdam. She has danced with Scapino Ballet, Ballet du Grand Théâtre de Genève and Rambert Dance Company, working with international choreographers such as Jiri Kylian, Mats Ek, Ohad Naharin and Christopher Bruce, among others.

In 1993, Veldman founded Alias Company with Guilherme Botelho. Their creation En Manqué won two major choreographic awards, the Dance Exchange International and the Prix Romand des Spectacle Independent. The following year, she was invited to join Rambert Dance Company and created three works for their repertoire. She has created and re-staged works for Les Grands Ballets Canadiens de Montreal, Ballet Gulbenkian, Cullberg Ballet, Northern Ballet Theatre, The Royal New Zealand Ballet, the Komische Oper Berlin, Scottish Dance Theatre, Cedar Lake Contemporary Ballet, amongst others.

== Creations ==
- 1987 - Sem Titulo - Scapino Ballet
- 1988 - Kleur Bekennen - Scapino Ballet
- 1991 - Close - Le Grands Theatre de Geneve
- 1993 - 40 Watt - Le Grands Theatre de Geneve
- 1994 - En Manqué - Alias Company
- 1995 - Kol Simcha - Rambert Dance Company
- 1997 - Greymatter - Rambert Dance Company
- 1998 - Somna - Ballet Central
- 1999 - Carmen - Northern Ballet Theatre
- 2000 - 7 DS - Rambert Dance Company
- 2001 - A Streetcar Named Desire - Northern Ballet Theatre
- 2001 - See Blue Through - Ballet Gulbenkian
- 2001 - Chase Case - Eurovision Young Dancer of the Year
- 2002 - I Remember Red - Cullberg Ballet
- 2002 - Possibly Six - Les Grands Ballets Canadiens de Montreal
- 2003 - '0' (She Who Was) - Komische Oper Berlin
- 2003 - Tender Hooks - Ballet Gulbenkian
- 2004 - Outsight - Ballet Gulbenkian
- 2004 - Track - Scottish Dance Theatre
- 2005 - TooT - Les Grands Ballets Canadiens de Montreal
- 2006 - Sweet & Sour - Iceland Dance Company
- 2007 - Cinderella - Goteborg Ballet Sweden
- 2007 - Stop and Go and Yes and No - Introdans, Holland
- 2007 - Peter & the Wolf - In the Wings
- 2008 - Frame of View - Cederlake, New York, USA
- 2009 - Session - Introdans, Holland
- 2010 - Momo - Ballet Bern, Switzerland
- 2011 - Language Matters - Ballet Mainz
- 2011 - Kind of a Sort - Northwest Dance Project, Portland, USA
- 2012 - new work - students of the Modern Theatre Dance Academy in Amsterdam, Holland
- 2012 - Les Noces - Le Grand Théâtre de Genève
- 2012 - The Little Prince - Les Grands Ballets, Montréal
- 2012 - In the Skin I'm in 1, 2 & 3 - Headspace, UK
- 2013 - Tristan & Isolde - Longborough Festival, UK
- 2014 - The 3 Dancers - Rambert Dance Company, UK
- 2014 - new work - students of the London Contemporary Dance School, UK
- 2016 - The Happiness Project - Umanoove/Didy Veldman
- 2016 - 360° - Luzerner Theater, Switzerland
- 2016 - new work - graduate students London Contemporary Dance School
- 2017 - new work - graduate students Rambert School
- 2018 - The Knot - Umanoove/Didy Veldman
- 2019 - new work - Transitions Dance Company
- 2019 - Is to Be - The Partner Schools of the Prix de Lausanne
- 2019 - a.part - Map Dance, Chichester University
- 2019 - Sense of Time - Birmingham Royal Ballet
- 2019 - Made in Holland - National Ballet School, Amsterdam
- 2020 - Carmen - Natalia Osipova
- 2020 - @HOME - Humanoove

== Awards ==
- 1987 - Encouragement Perspective Prize for Sem Titulo
