= Vincent Warren =

Canadian dancer

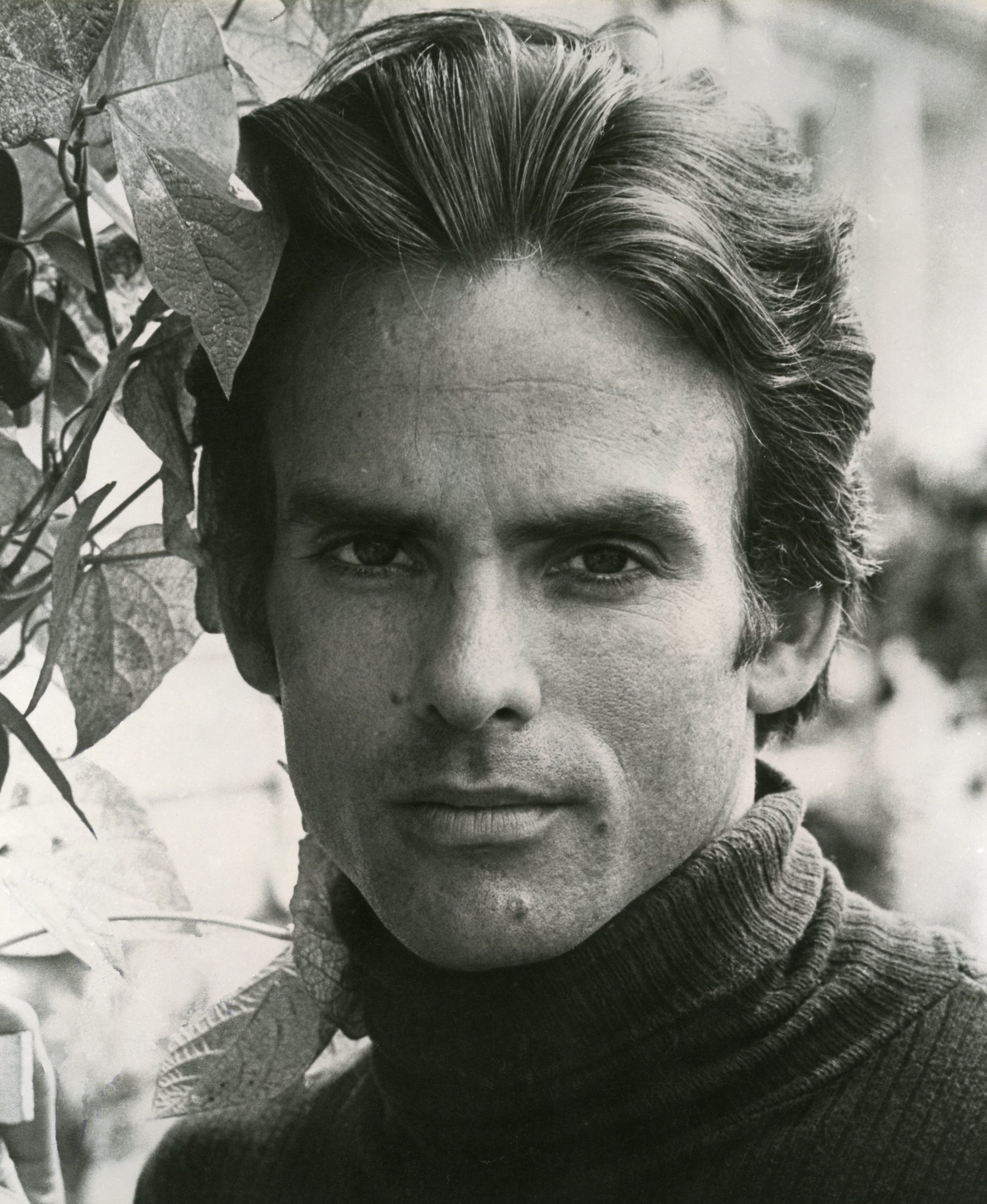
- Born: August 31, 1938; Jacksonville, Florida, U.S.A
- Died: October 25, 2017 (aged 79); Montreal, Quebec, Canada
- Occupations: Dancer and historian

Vincent de Paul Warren, CM (August 31, 1938 – October 25, 2017) was a Canadian dancer, teacher, dance historian and lecturer. After a distinguished career as a ballet dancer and teacher, he became widely known and respected as a historian and archivist. He is celebrated as a leading figure in the dance world of Canada.

== Early life, education, and training ==
Vincent de Paul Warren was born in Jacksonville, Florida. He and his fraternal twin Denis were the youngest of their parents' fourteen children. Influenced by his mother's love of opera and music, Vincent was a sensitive boy, receptive to what he has called "a fantasy life of beauty." At age ten, he saw the ballet movie The Red Shoes (1948) and discovered his future profession. At eleven, he began taking ballet classes with Betty Hyatt Ogilvie, a former Balanchine dancer. His twin brother Denis was drawn to the Roman Catholic church and at thirteen left home to join the clergy. Vincent, however, continued his dance training throughout his teenage years. He graduated from high school at eighteen, and soon he, too, left home, headed for New York City with a letter of introduction to Igor Schwezoff, a Russian-trained teacher at the American Ballet Theatre School. He was given a scholarship to study at the school, where he excelled in classes. As a promising student, he was soon offered another scholarship, at the Metropolitan Opera Ballet School, where Antony Tudor was teaching. At age nineteen, in 1957, he auditioned for a position in the company at the Met and was hired as a member of the corps de ballet.

== Ballet dancer ==
Warren danced with the Metropolitan Opera Ballet for two years, 1957–59, during which time he took the opportunity to expand his training with leading teachers in New York City. In dance classes with Merce Cunningham and James Waring, he became adept in the expressive styles of modern dance while continuing to study classical ballet technique with Igor Schwezoff, Anatol Oboukoff, and Antony Tudor. In 1959-60, he danced with the Santa Fe Opera Ballet and then the Pennsylvania Ballet, based in Philadelphia. In 1961, he joined Les Grands Ballets Canadiens in Montréal, where, except for dancing as guest artist with Ballet Nacional de Guatemala (1963) and seasons with the Théâtre Français de la Danse in Paris (1969–70) and the Cologne Opera Ballet (1970–71), he remained until his retirement from the stage in 1979.

After more than a decade of living and dancing in Canada, he became a Canadian citizen in 1973.

=== Repertoire ===
With Les Grands Ballets Canadiens, Warren danced leading roles in many classical, romantic, neoclassical, and contemporary works. Among them were Albrecht in Giselle, Siegfried in Le Lac des Cygnes (Swan Lake), the Poet in Les Sylphides, and Drummer Boy and First Cadet in Bal des Cadets (Graduation Ball), David Lichine's merry romp at a girls' school celebration. He also appeared in principal roles in George Balanchine's Allegro Brillante, Divertimento no. 15, The Four Temperaments, Serenade, and Theme and Variations. Notably, Warren created many roles for the artistic director and resident choreographer of the company, Ludmilla Chiriaeff and Fernand Nault. He danced principal male roles in Chiriaeff's Bagatelle (aka Jeux d'Arlequin), Cendrillon (Cinderella), Mémoires de Camille, Pierrot de la Lune, Quatrième Concert Royal, and Suite Canadienne, among others. Her penultimate choreographic work was Artère (1976), a solo she made especially for him, set to music by Gabriel Charpentier. In Nault's productions, Warren danced leading roles in Carmina Burana, Casse-Noisette (The Nutcracker), Hip and Straight, Pas Rompu (Not Broken), and the hugely successful Tommy, set to the rock opera by The Who.

In works by other contemporary choreographers, Warren was cast in leading roles in Catulli Carmina and Villon by John Butler, L'Oiseau de Feu (The Firebird) by Maurice Béjart, Icare by Lucas Hoving, Aureole by Paul Taylor, and Les Noces by Lar Lubovitch. In the ballets of Brian Macdonald, Warren starred in Diabelli Variations, Double Quartet, Romeo and Juliet, and Tam Ti Delam, set to a Québécois folk song by Gilles Vigneault. He was especially acclaimed for his interpretation of the title role in Macdonald's Adieu Robert Schumann, created in 1979 for his farewell performance, with both ballerina Annette av Paul and pianist Denise Massé playing Clara Schumann, and along famed Canadian contralto Maureen Forrester singing Clara's reminiscences. Reviewing the performance, CBC Radio's Kati Vita wrote: "Vincent Warren blazes through the work like a slender crimson flame and compels such attention [that] one is oblivious to all else when he is on stage."

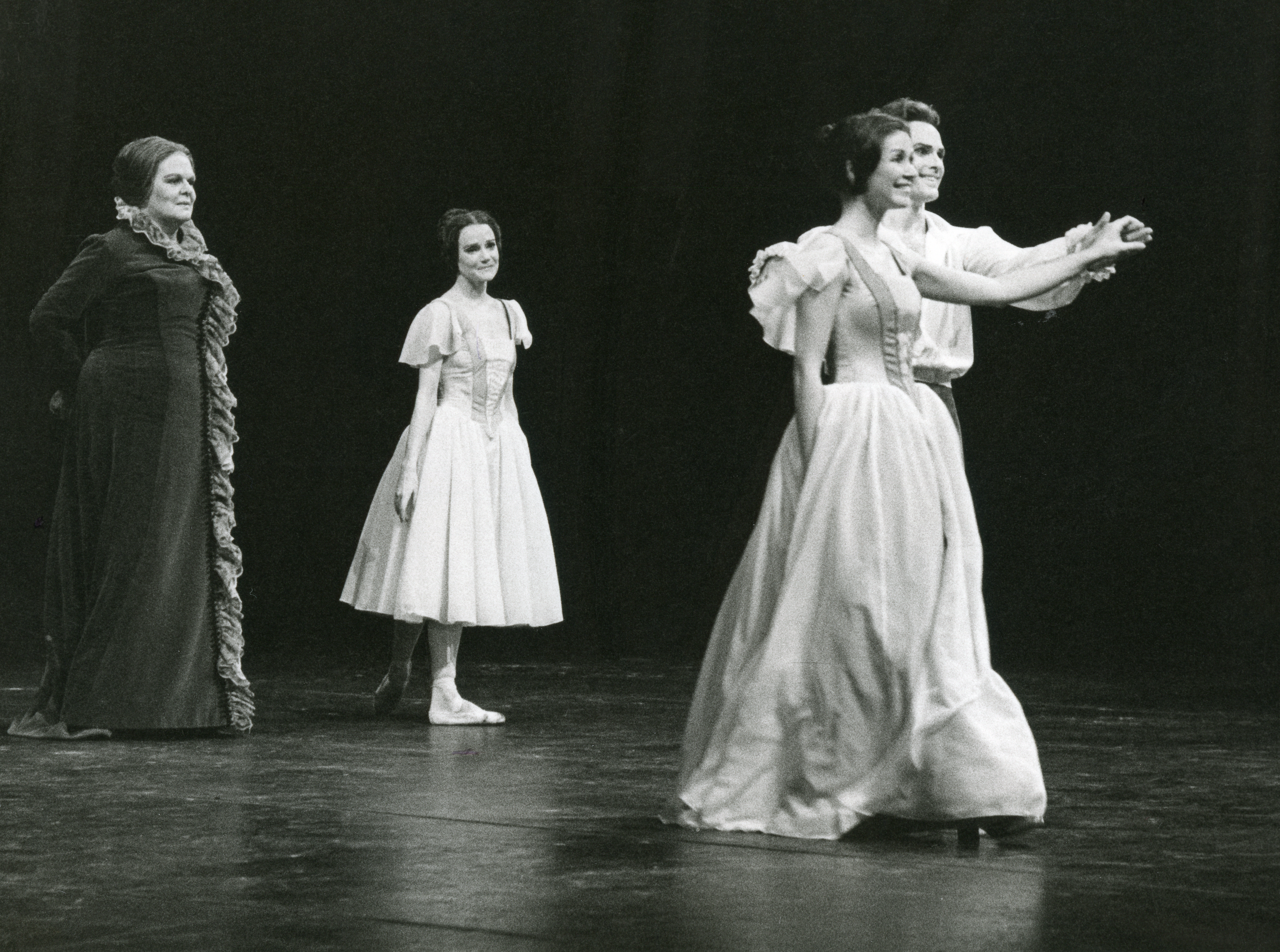
Vincent Warren hand in hand with Denise Massé on the set of Les Grands Ballets Canadiens' performance of 'Adieu Robert Schumann (1979)' by R.M. Schafer and choreographed by Brian MacDonald, with Maureen Forrester (left) and Annette av Paul (center).

Warren's curiosity about all forms of kinetic artistry led him to the postmodern experimentation at Judson Dance Theater in New York City, where he appeared in performances with James Waring and Aileen Passloff from 1959 to 1964. In Montréal, he discovered similar avant-garde dancers at work. While remaining a principal dancer with Les Grands Ballets Canadiens, he danced with Le Groupe de Danse Moderne de Montréal, a company formed by Françoise Riopelle and Jeanne Renaud, and, on numerous occasions, with Le Groupe de la Place Royale, directed by Jeanne Renaud and Peter Boneham. With his varied training, he found that he could perform Renaud's modern minimalism with the same ease and precision he demonstrated in classical ballets. Among other works, he danced leading roles in Renaud's Blanc sur Blanc (1964) and Phases et Reseaux (1965). Some twenty years later, during the 1987 Festival de Nouvelle Danse, Warren appeared in Paul-André Fortier's Chaleurs and showed that his command of modern dance technique had not faded. In 2016, Warren agreed to be a part of a project by Sophie Corriveau and Katya Montaignac, produced by Danse-Cité and copresented by Agora de la danse, Nous (ne) sommes (pas) tous des danseurs. Focusing on specific themes, this 'danced round table' brought together some twenty dancers from different generations to share their experiences and reflections through reading and movement, highlighting the foundations and workings of the dance profession, as well as the myths that accompany it. The work was shown on May 6, 7 and 8, 2016. However, due to an unrelated injury, Warren did not perform on the last night.

On television, Warren performed on many shows originating in Canada and France. In Montréal, he appeared numerous times in works by Chiriaeff, Todd Bolender, and Renaud on Les Beaux Dimanches (Beautiful Sundays) and L'Heure du Concert (The Concert Hour), which were broadcast bilingually by Société Radio-Canada across the country. On film, Warren can be seen dancing with Margaret Mercier in Norman McLaren's Pas de deux (1968), winner of seventeen awards in experimental filmmaking, including the 1969 award for best animated film by the British Academy of Film and Television Arts. More recently, he also appeared in two compelling documentary films: Marie Brodeur's Danseur à tout prix (2002) and Marie Beaulieu's Les Météores: Vincent Warren, un temps en mouvements (2011). In 2016, a documentary on Warren was produced by TAP Film Inc and La Compagnie de la Marie, A Man of Dance. The film, directed by Marie Brodeur, won the Best Canadian Film at the International Art Film Festival (FIFA) in Montreal, Canada.

=== Technique and style ===
As a performer, Warren was known as a lyrical and romantic dancer, valued for his charisma, theatricality, and vivid stage presence. Although he possessed a sound classical ballet technique, he was not a bravura dancer. Spectacular feats of athleticism were not his forte, but he was a strong and attentive partner in classical roles and was favored by many ballerinas. His partners included such international stars as Ana Cardus, Janine Charrat, Alexandra Radius, Claire Sombert, and Ghislaine Thesmar as well as Canadian ballerinas Irene Apinee, Melissa Hayden, Veronique Landory, Andrée Millaire, Sonia Taverner, and Sonia Vartanian. Warren's looks, physique, and bearing made him an ideal interpreter of classical and romantic roles. As Albrecht, his partnership with German-born Christa Mertins in Giselle was highly acclaimed, especially in the ethereal, ghostly sequences in act 2.

Warren was also celebrated in contemporary works that require emotive, expressive dancing. In London, he won high critical praise for his performance in John Butler's Catulli Carmina, set to Carl Orff's scenic cantata of the lyrical texts of the Latin poet Catullus. Montréal critics praised him especially in roles created for him in a balletic modern idiom by Fernand Nault. Three works with religious and spiritual references were Gehenne (1965), Cérémonie (1972), and Cantique des Cantiques (Song of Songs, 1974). In Gehenne set to music by Alvin Etler and named for a biblical place of extreme suffering, Warren was able to express his deep grief at the death of New York City poet Frank O'Hara, the "love of his life," who died after a vehicle accident on a Fire Island beach in the summer of 1966. (Warren had been the addressee of O'Hara's poem, "Having a Coke with You.") In Cérémonie, a rock mass that recalls Leonardo da Vinci's famous painting of the Last Supper of Jesus, and Cantique des Cantiques, inspired by the biblical Song of Solomon, celebrating sexual love, Warren drew upon his fundamental artistic vision: to give meaning to movement.

== Later life and careers ==
Following his retirement from Les Grands Ballets Canadiens in 1979, Warren soon put his dance talents and broad knowledge of dance history to use as he embarked on what would become multiple careers as teacher, lecturer, librarian, and archivist.

=== Teacher and lecturer ===
At the invitation of Madame Chiriaeff, director of Les Grands Ballets Canadiens, Warren began teaching classes in ballet technique to teenagers in the company's affiliated school, the École Supérieure de Danse du Québec, in 1979. As his teaching skills grew, he expanded his schedule to include classes in male variations and partnering, which became popular with advanced students. He conducted his classes in the formal manner traditional in all ballet schools, but his cheerful disposition and good humor in giving technical corrections to his students lent much to his effectiveness as a teacher. He continued to teach at the school until 1992.

When the instructor of dance history at the school departed, Chiriaeff asked Warren to replace him, despite the fact that he had no formal education in the field. She knew, however, that Warren had been collecting books, prints, and magazines about dance for years and that he had developed an encyclopedic knowledge. Soon after he began teaching technique classes, in 1979, Warren undertook the role of dance historian with enthusiasm and began to formulate his own system of teaching the subject. In the course of time, he was recognized by academics as a brilliant autodidact. He taught and lectured on dance history in English and French at all four universities in Montréal and at many Canadian dance institutions. His courses at McGill University (1988–1995) and at Les Ateliers de Danse Moderne de Montréal (1989–1999) were well-attended, as were his lectures at Concordia University, Ottawa University, Université de Montréal, Université du Québec à Montréal, the Musée National des Beaux Arts du Québec, the Musée des Beaux Arts de Montréal, the National Theatre School of Canada, the Banff Center for the Arts, the McCord Museum, and the New York Public Library for the Performing Arts.

In 1999, Warren was invited to lecture at four cities in India: Delhi, Hyderabad, Madras, and Bangalore. His lecture "Abhinaya in Ballet," on the Indian concept of the art of expression, won the prize for best presentation at the Natya Kala Conference held annually at Madras. His lecture "Yearning for the Spiritual Ideal: The Influence of India on Western Dance, 1626-2003," was published in Sruti (December 2000), an English-language monthly magazine on Indian performing arts, and in Dance Research Journal (2006). Notable among his other lecture topics are the seasons of Sergei Diaghilev's Ballets Russes, 1909–1929; the Ballet de l'Opéra de Paris at the time of Degas; and the Imperial Russian Ballet at the time of Fabergé. Warren continued to teach dance history at the École Supérieure de Ballet du Québec (so renamed in 2010) until shortly before his death.

=== Librarian and archivist ===
While he continued to teach classes at the École Supérieure, Warren volunteered to run the school's small dance library, thus beginning his fourth career. Despite a limited budget, he installed proper book shelves, updated the cataloging system, allowed books to circulate, and began a vigorous campaign of acquisitions to enlarge the library's holdings. Eventually, he donated his own sizeable collection of dance materials, sought donations from friends in the dance world, and continued to purchase books, videos, prints, photographs, programs, and dance memorabilia. He was officially appointed curator of the library in 1982 and served in that capacity for twenty-four years, until 2006. Now named the Bibliothèque de la Danse Vincent-Warren, in his honor, it is the largest dance library in Canada.

=== Related activities ===
During his later years, Warren was active in numerous dance-related organizations in Québec and elsewhere. He was a member of the board of directors of the Dance in Canada Association from 1979 to 1983 and was its chairman from 1981 to 1982. He also served on the board of directors of the Regroupment des Professionels de la Danse du Québec from 1986 to 1990 and as its president for the 1987-1988 term. Subsequently, he was a member of the Arts Council of the Montreal Urban Community (1993–1999), in which he took an active role. For the dance section of the Canada Council, he served on the Committee on Archives and Documentation, and continued to serve on many artistic juries for the Canada Council and for Québec's Conseil des Arts et Lettres thereafter. He also served as a judge for dance competitions such as the Rencontres Chorégraphiques, held at Bagnolet, France, and the Festival des Arts de Saint-Sauveur and the International Festival de Danse Encore in Québec.

== Awards and honours ==
In recognition of his accomplishments, Warren received a Queen Elizabeth II Silver Jubilee Medal in 1977, the Dance in Canada Service Award in 1984, and the Prix Denise-Pelletier in 1992. The Queen's Jubilee Medal was awarded for his contributions to the performing arts in Canada. The Pelletier prize is one of the Prix du Québec lifetime achievement awards given annually by the provincial government. In 2004, Warren was named a member of the Order of Canada. In 2012, he was among the recipients of the Queen Elizabeth II Diamond Jubilee Medal, created to honour significant achievements and contributions to national culture by Canadian citizens. In 2017, Warren was named a member of the Ordre des arts et des lettres du Québec, which honours the commitment and devotion of those who have significantly contributed to the development, promotion or dissemination of the arts in Quebec.
