= Brian Macdonald (choreographer) =

Canadian dancer, choreographer and director

Brian Ronald Macdonald
- Born: May 14, 1928; Montreal, Quebec, Canada
- Died: November 29, 2014 (aged 86); Stratford, Ontario, Canada
- Occupations: Teacher, dancer, choreographer, director
- Known for: Dancer, choreographer
- Awards: Order of Canada

Brian Ronald Macdonald CC (May 14, 1928 – November 29, 2014) was a Canadian dancer, choreographer and director of opera, theatre and musical theatre.

== Early and personal life ==
Brian Macdonald was born in Montreal, Quebec on May 14, 1928. His father Ian was Irish and worked at Dominion Glass Co. as a sales manager while his mother Mabel Lee was Scottish. Macdonald was a child actor for Radio-Canada and studied piano.

In 1959 Macdonald's first wife Olivia Wyatt died in an automobile accident. Macdonald became a single father, raising his three-year-old son. Macdonald met his second wife Annette av Paul while the artistic director of the Royal Swedish Ballet. They married in 1964.

He died on November 29, 2014, in Stratford, Ontario, of bone cancer.

== Professional career ==
=== Dancer ===
Macdonald was taking a B.A. in English at McGill University when he began ballet classes with noted teachers Gerald Crevier and Elizabeth Leese. From 1947-1949 he was music critic for the Montreal Herald. Macdonald joined the National Ballet of Canada in 1951 and was one of its founding members. He left the company in 1953 due to a serious arm injury.

=== Ballet choreographer ===
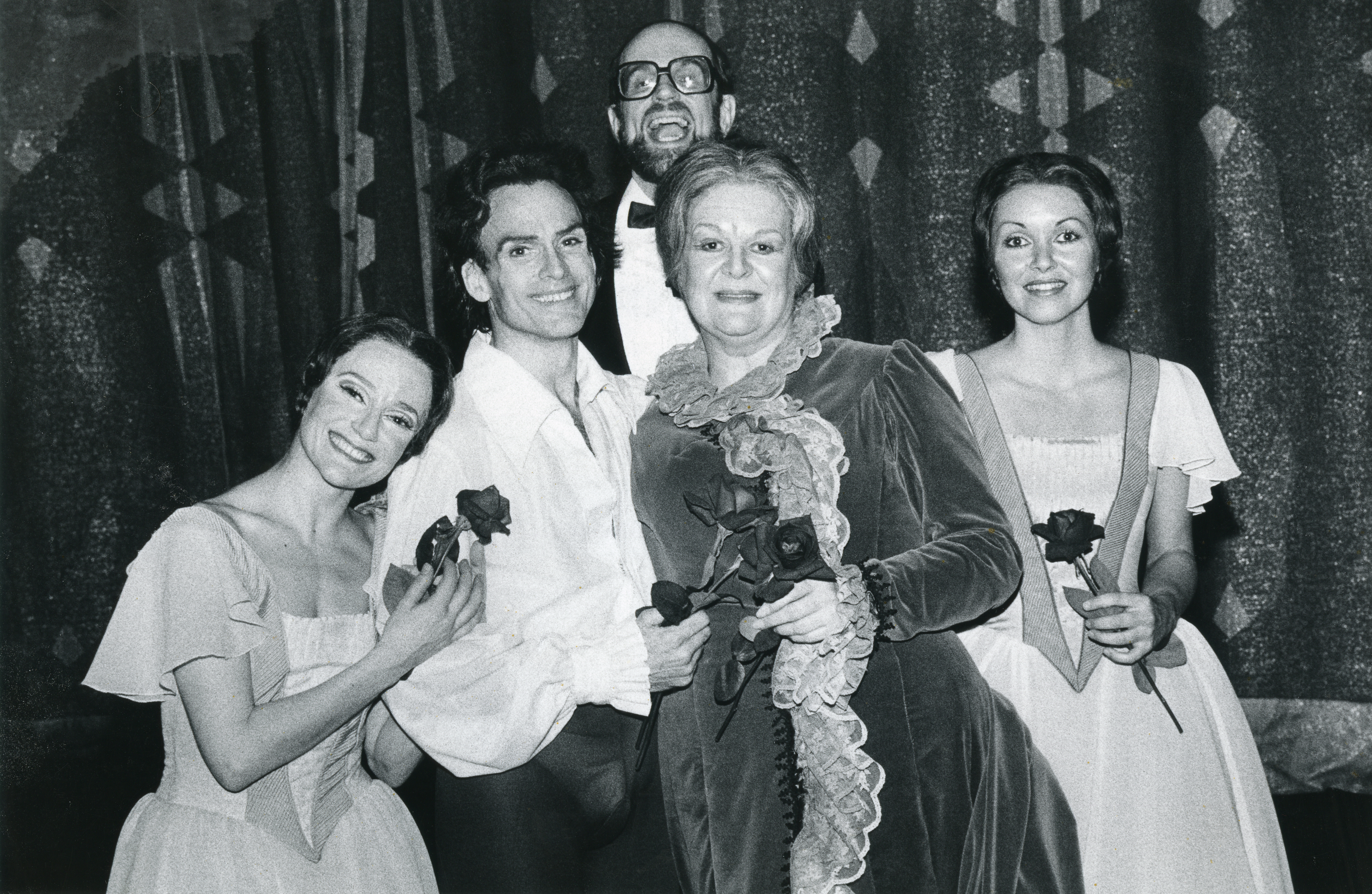
Backstage of Les Grands Ballets Canadiens' performance of 'Adieu Robert Schumann (1979)' by R.M. Schafer and choreographed by Brian MacDonald (center), with (left to right) Annette av Paul, Vincent Warren, Maureen Forrester, and Denise Massé

Early on in his dance training Macdonald was inspired to study choreography, affected by the Ballets Russes rehearsal of Concerto Barocco by George Balanchine in Montreal. He was struck by the way the ballerinas were dancing en pointe and in high heels.

In 1956 he established his own company called the Montreal Theatre Ballet. He went on to create works for the Royal Winnipeg Ballet such as The Darkling in 1958 and Les Whoops De Doo in 1959. One of his most acclaimed works was Time Out of Mind created for Joffrey Ballet in 1963. He choreographed Rose Latulippe in 1966, which was Canada's first evening-length ballet performance and the first full-length colour production filmed by the Canadian Broadcasting Company.

He was artistic director of the Royal Swedish Ballet from 1964 to 1967 and artistic director of Harkness Ballet from 1967 to 1968, during which time he choreographed Canto Indio. He then moved on to become artistic director of Israel's Batsheva Dance Theatre from 1971–1972 and Les Grands Ballets Canadiens from 1974 to 1977, where he choreographed Tam Ti Delam in 1974 and Lignes et Pointes. In 1978 Macdonald choreographed Double Quartet which features a young woman and her admirers dancing to the string quartets of Schubert and R. Murray Schafer.

Macdonald's last choreographic work was Requiem 9/11, which premiered at the National Arts Centre in 2002. The piece was Macdonald's perspective of the 9/11 terrorist attacks, performed to Giuseppe Verdi's Requiem. The ballet was danced in front of images of violent events from history. The dancers were covered in ash-looking makeup to reflect the appearance of survivors fleeing the World Trade Center buildings. The dance was well received by audience members and critics. Hugh Winsor from The Globe and Mail, who was present at the inaugural performance, wrote that the audience gave the show "an extended standing ovation."

=== Musical theatre choreographer and director ===
In 1957, Macdonald and his wife, Olivia choreographed the satirical revue My Fur Lady which went on a national tour of over 400 performances. In 1968 Macdonald directed Maggie Flynn for its premiere on Broadway.

Macdonald moved to Stratford, Ontario, and became an associate director of the Stratford Festival. He became known for reviving Gilbert and Sullivan operettas to critical acclaim. He directed The Mikado in 1982 which toured the world until it made its debut on Broadway. It earned Macdonald Tony Award nominations for Best Choreography and Best Direction of a Musical. Macdonald's last directed musical at the Stratford Festival was The Music Man in 1996, ending 17 seasons with the Stratford Festival.

=== Opera ===
Macdonald's debut as an opera director was Cosi fan tutte by Wolfgang Mozart in 1972. This was followed by Massenet's Cendrillon in 1979 and Madama Butterfly in 1990.

His final work was a revival his 1990 staging of Madama Butterfly with the Canadian Opera Company in 2014. The show was praised for the talent of the cast in their vocal abilities. The show was criticised for a lack of emotional connection between the performers, with Richard Ouzounian of the Toronto Star saying, "[T]he whole thing now has that "paint by the numbers" kind of feel about it, with everyone coughing up lungfuls of emotion, but rarely connecting to each other at all in any genuine way." Robert Harris of The Globe and Mail commented that the show struggled to overcome issues of racism and prejudice that exist in the opera.

=== Dance teacher ===
In 1982 Macdonald became the head of the Banff Centre's Summer Dance Program. He split the program into a training section and a professional section which performed remounted works by Macdonald, George Balanchine and winners of the Clifford E Lee Choreographic Award. Some of his students have included Johnny Wright, the male lead in the West End production of Dirty Dancing, and Crystal Pite. He was head of the program until 2001 when he became artistic advisor from 2001-2007.

== Awards ==
- 1964 Paris International Gold Star for choreography
- 1967 Officer of the Order of Canada
- 1970 Paris International Gold Star for choreography
- 1983 Molson Prize
- 1988 Dance Canada Prize
- 1988 Banff Centre National Arts Award
- 2001 Walter Carsen Prize for Excellence in the Performing Arts
- 2002 Companion of the Order of Canada
- 2008 Governor General Performing Arts Award for Lifetime Achievement
- 2012 Queen Elizabeth II Diamond Jubilee Medal
