= Cullberg Ballet =

Swedish contemporary dance company

Cullberg (formerly Cullberg Ballet or Swedish Cullbergbaletten) is a Swedish contemporary dance company.

It was founded by the modern dancer and pioneer choreographer Birgit Cullberg in 1967, who brought it to fame. After Cullberg's retirement in 1985 the company was until 1993 run by her son, the popular Swedish dancer, choreographer and stage director Mats Ek.

From 2003 Cullbergbaletten was managed by choreographer Johan Inger and from 2009 to 2013 Anna Grip held the position as Artistic Director. From 2014 to 2022, Gabriel Smeets was the Artistic Director of the company. As of 2022 Kristine Slettevold is the Artistic Director of Cullberg.

Cullberg is part of the National Swedish Touring Theatre and tours both nationally and internationally.

== Repertoire and artistic profile ==
Cullberg originated in the modern dance and dance theatre tradition developed by Birgit Cullberg during the mid-twentieth century. During its early decades, the company became internationally known through works by Birgit Cullberg and later by Mats Ek, whose reinterpretations of classical ballets such as Giselle, Swan Lake, Carmen and Sleeping Beauty contributed to the company's international reputation.

Since the 1990s, Cullberg has gradually shifted its focus from modern ballet towards contemporary dance. The company primarily commissions and produces new works by Swedish and international choreographers and presents them through national and international touring.

Choreographers who have created works for Cullberg include Jiří Kylián, Nacho Duato, William Forsythe, Crystal Pite, Sidi Larbi Cherkaoui, Jefta van Dinther, Deborah Hay, Trajal Harrell, Alma Söderberg, Renan Martins, Ligia Lewis and Faye Driscoll.

The company is based in Norsborg, outside Stockholm, and operates as part of the National Swedish Touring Theatre (Riksteatern).
