= Les Grands Ballets Canadiens =

Ballet company based in Montreal, Quebec

Les Grands Ballets Canadiens (GBC) is a ballet company based in Montreal, Quebec, Canada. A creative and repertory company, it performs works that reflect the diverse trends of contemporary ballet.

== History ==
Les Grands Ballets Canadiens de Montréal was founded in 1957 by Ludmilla Chiriaeff. Conductor and composer Michel Perrault served as the organization's first music director.

Since its creation, Les Grands Ballets has performed a broad range of dance, ranging from classics to major contemporary work. Under the direction of Chiriaeff and Fernand Nault (1965–1973), Brian Macdonald (1974–1977) and Lawrence Rhodes (1990–1999), the institution fostered the development of such notable artists as James Kudelka, Édouard Lock and Ginette Laurin.

In 1981 the company participated alongside the National Ballet of Canada, the Royal Winnipeg Ballet, le Groupe de la Place Royale, the Danny Grossman Dance Company, the Toronto Dance Theatre, Winnipeg Contemporary Dancers and the Anna Wyman Dance Theatre in the Canadian Dance Spectacular, a dance show at Ottawa's National Arts Centre which was filmed by the National Film Board of Canada for the 1982 documentary film Gala.

In 2000, Gradimir Pankov became artistic director. A native of Macedonia, Pankov previously served as artistic director of Nederlands Dans Theater II (Netherlands), the National Ballet of Finland (Helsinki), the Cullberg Ballet (Sweden), and Ballet du Grand Théâtre de Genève (Switzerland).

In 2017, Ivan Cavallari became the artistic director of les Grands Ballets. Born in Italy, he trained at Teatro alla Scala Ballet School in Milan. Before becoming artistic director of Les Grands Ballets, he was artistic director of the West Australian Ballet and then the Ballet de l'Opéra national du Rhin. The ballet masters are Hervé Courtain, appointed in 2017, and Marina Villanueva Arias, appointed in 2020.

The company has commissioned work from some of the world's most prominent choreographers: The Queen of Spades by Kim Brandstrup; The Butterfly Effect by Shawn Hounsell; Between Ashes and Angels by Adam Hougland; Noces, Cinderella and The Rite of Spring by Stijn Celis; The Little Prince, Possibly Six and TooT by Didy Veldman; The Beast and the Beauty by Kader Belarbi; Four Seasons by Mauro Bigonzetti; Minus One and Danz by Ohad Naharin; Rodin/Claudel by Peter Quanz; and Re–II by Shen Wei.

Its repertoire also includes major acquisitions by such artists as Mats Ek, Jiří Kylián, Jean-Christophe Maillot and Christopher Wheeldon, along with works by young creators like Stephan Thoss, Didy Veldman and Peter Quanz. In 2008 Gradimir Pankov established the national choreographic contest, won by Jean-Sébastien Couture, which has allowed Les Grands Ballets to showcase work by emerging Canadian choreographers. Each season, Les Grands Ballets invited international companies to perform as part of its program; the list includes Houston Ballet, Royal Winnipeg Ballet, Alvin Ailey® American Dance Theater, Cullberg Ballet (Sweden), Compañía Nacional de Danza (Spain), Warsaw Ballet (Poland), Cloud Gate Dance Theatre (Taiwan), Shen Wei Dance Arts (New York City), Ballet de l’Opéra de Lyon (France), Dutch National Ballet and Eifman Ballet Theatre of St-Petersburg (Russia).

Since Ivan Cavallari took artistic leadership, the company focuses on extending its repertoire to both showcase the great ballet classics and acquire new works by emerging contemporary creators.

== Dancers ==
Dancers for the 2022–2023 season:

=== Principal Dancers ===
- Raphaël Bouchard
- Rachele Buriassi
- Roddy Doble
- Vanesa Garcia-Ribala Montoya
- Maude Sabourin
- Yui Sugawara

=== First Soloists ===
- Célestin Boutin
- Emma Garau Cima
- Anna Ishii
- Anya Nesvitaylo
- Esnel Ramos

=== Soloists ===
- Mai Kono
- Sahra Maira
- Stephen Satterfield
- Andre Santos

=== Demi-soloists ===
- Kiara DeNae Felder
- Graeme Fuhrman
- Jose Carlos Losada Morales
- Hamilton Nieh
- Éline Malègue

=== Corps de ballet ===
- Antoine Benjamin Bertran
- Bernardo Betancor
- Giuseppe Canale
- Bernard Dubois II
- Alexandra Eccles
- Kiara Flavin
- Maude Fleury
- François Gagné
- Étienne Gagnon-Delorme
- Sofía González
- Enno Kleinehanding
- Tatiana Lerebours
- James Lyttle
- Carrigan MacDonald
- Tetyana Martyanova
- Felixovich Morante
- Stefano Russiello
- Théodore Poubeau
- Catherine Toupin
- Angel Vizcaíno

=== Apprentice ===
- Oscar Lambert
- Christian Scifo
- Calista Shepheard
- Rose Trahan

=== Former principal dancer ===
- Rachel Rufer (2000-2010)
- Geneviève Guérard (1999-2006)

=== Former soloists ===
- Edi Blloshmi
- Hervé Courtain
- Émilie Durville
- Lénaïg Guégan (2007-2010)
- Marcin Kaczorowski
- Isabelle Paquette (2001-2010)
- Guillaume Pruneau (2002-2010)
- Jeremy Raia
- André Silva

== Notable people ==
- Iro Tembeck, faculty
