= Drayton Entertainment production history =

Drayton Entertainment is a not-for-profit professional theatre company based in Southwestern Ontario, Canada, operating seven venues across the province: the original Drayton Festival Theatre in Drayton, Huron Country Playhouse and Playhouse II in Grand Bend, King's Wharf Theatre in Penetanguishene, Schoolhouse Theatre in St. Jacobs, St. Jacobs Country Playhouse in Waterloo, and Hamilton Family Theatre Cambridge, formerly Dunfield Theatre Cambridge in Cambridge. A 2003 article stated Drayton Entertainment was Canada's largest employer for live entertainment.

The following is a chronological list of the productions that have been staged by Drayton Entertainment since its inception in 1991.

== 2019 season ==
- Annie
- Art
- Beauty and the Beast
- Elf
- Fiddler on the Loose,
- Glory
- Good Ol' Country Gospel
- Grease
- Jack and the Beanstalk: The Panto
- The Miracle Worker
- Newsies
- Priscilla, Queen of the Desert
- Rocky the Musical
- Shear Madness
- Sleeping Beauty: The Panto
- Thoroughly Modern Millie
- Twelve Angry Men
- You'll Get Used To It! ... The War Show

== 2018 season ==
- The Birds and The Bees
- Canada 151: Better Late Than Sorry
- Cinderella: The Panto
- Cruisin' Classics
- The Drowsy Chaperone
- Ghost
- Hairspray
- Holiday Inn
- Jack and the Beanstalk: The Panto
- Jonas & Barry in the Home
- Kings & Queens of Country
- The Little Mermaid
- Man of La Mancha
- Out of Order
- The Rainmaker
- Shear Madness
- West Side Story

== 2017 season ==
- All Shook Up
- Beauty and the Beast
- Death of a Salesman
- Harvest,
- Honk!
- Jonas & Barry in the Home
- Joseph and the Amazing Technicolor Dreamcoat
- Kings & Queens of Country
- Lucky Stiff
- Marathon of Hope: The Musical
- Million Dollar Quartet
- Office Hours
- One for the Pot
- Rock of Ages
- Singin' in the Rain
- The 39 Steps
- Thoroughly Modern Millie

== 2016 season ==
- Aladdin: The Panto
- All Shook Up
- Anything Goes
- Brighton Beach Memoirs
- Canadian Legends
- Cinderella: The Panto
- Footloose
- Hilda's Yard
- It Runs In The Family
- The Ladies Foursome
- Legends ... of Rock 'n' Roll
- Little Shop of Horrors
- Mamma Mia!
- Marathon of Hope: The Musical
- The Men's Foursome
- Red Rock Diner
- Sister Act
- Smokey Joe's Cafe
- Unnecessary Farce

== 2015 season ==
- Aladdin: The Panto
- Anne of Green Gables
- Canadian Legends
- Chicago
- Footloose
- Norm Foster's Hilda's Yard
- Irving Berlin's White Christmas
- Last Chance Romance
- Legends...of Rock 'n' Roll
- Norm Foster's Looking
- Monty Python's Spamalot
- Sexy Laundry
- Snow White: The Panto
- The Crazy Time
- The Last Resort
- The Music Man
- The Odd Couple
- The Pirates of Penzance
- The Wizard of Oz

== 2014 season ==
- A Closer Walk With Patsy Cline
- Boeing Boeing
- Broadway Heroes
- Damn Yankees - Words & Music by Richard Adler & Jerry Ross
- Deathtrap
- Disney's The Little Mermaid - Music by Alan Menken Lyrics by Howard Ashman & Glenn Slater Book by Doug Wright
- Footloose
- Hollywood Sings
- I'll Be Back Before Midnight - By Peter Colley
- Legally Blonde
- Les Misérables
- Look, No Hans!
- Peter Pan - Written by Simon Aylin & Trudy Moffatt
- Run For Your Wife
- Snow White: The Panto -
- Rodgers & Hammerstein's South Pacific - Music by Richard Rodgers
- The Affections of May - By Norm Foster
- The Freddy Fusion Science Magic Show
- Twist and Shout: The British Invasion
- Wichita Lineman
- South Pacific

== 2013 season ==
- Big Band Legends
- Buddy - The Buddy Holly Story
- Godspell - Book by John Michael Tebelak
- Johnny and June - Created by Chris McHarge & Colin Stewart
- Legends of Harmony - Conceived & Directed by Alex Mustakas
- Lend Me A Tenor
- The Love List - By Norm Foster
- Mary Poppins
- Oliver! - Music, Lyrics & Book by Lionel Bart
- Peter Pan
- The Songs of Sinatra
- Too Many Cooks
- Tuesdays With Morrie
- Sorry... I'm Canadian
- The Sound of Music
- Spamalot
- Weekend Comedy
- White Christmas

== 2012 season ==
- The Sound of Music
- Perfect Wedding
- Johnny and June
- The Melville Boys
- Blue Suede Shoes: Memories of the King
- Murder at Oakwood Resort
- Murder at Fern Resort
- Harvey
- The Wizard of Oz
- Big Band Legends
- 9 To 5: The Musical
- Annie
- The Love List

== 2011 season ==
- Dance Legends
- Italian Funerals and Other Festive Occasions
- How the Other Half Loves
- How to Succeed in Business Without Really Trying
- Who's Under Where?
- Blue Suede Shoes: Memories of the King
- Hairspray
- Blood Brothers
- Guys and Dolls
- The Wizard of Oz
- The Melville Boys
- Shear Madness
- Murder at the Best Western

== 2010 season ==
- On Golden Pond
- Cowgirls
- Guys and Dolls
- Separate Beds
- Sweet Charity
- Country Legends
- Cagney!
- Dance Legends
- The 25th Annual Putnam County Spelling Bee
- See How They Run
- Tap Dogs
- High School Musical
- Twelve Angry Men
- Peter Pan

== 2009 season ==
- Country Legends
- The Odd Couple
- Blue Champagne
- See How They Run
- Brigadoon
- 2 Pianos 4 Hands
- Oliver!
- Camelot
- Evita
- High School Musical
- The Odd Couple
- Moon Over Buffalo
- Country Legends
- Caught in the Act II: Repeat Offenders
- Judy & David's Pig Mania
- Me and My Girl
- The Heiress
- Robin Hood

== 2008 season ==
- The Ballad of Stompin' Tom
- The Mousetrap
- The Drawer Boy
- A Funny Thing Happened On The Way To The Forum
- Steel Magnolias
- Legends
- I Love You, You're Perfect, Now Change
- My Fair Lady
- Sorry... I'm Canadian
- Dirty Rotten Scoundrels
- Swing!
- One for the Pot
- Cinderella
- Forever Plaid

== 2007 season ==
- Cash On Delivery
- Jasper Station
- The Ladies of Broadway
- Funny Money
- Man of La Mancha
- Mom's The Word
- Cats
- The Last Resort
- Miss Saigon
- Legends
- Buddy: The Buddy Holly Story
- Caught In The Act
- Legends
- Judy & David's GoldiRocks
- Crazy for You
- The Christmas Show
- The Foursome
- Dads: The Musical

== 2006 season ==
- Anne of Green Gables
- Not Now Darling
- Sorry...I'm Canadian
- Twist and Shout: The British Invasion
- The Foursome
- Beauty and the Beast
- Lost In Yonkers
- Give My Regards To Broadway
- Nunsense
- Dial M For Murder
- Cotton Patch Gospel
- Cats
- Corpse
- Aladdin

== 2005 season ==
- Oklahoma!
- Lost In Yonkers
- The Last Resort
- The World Goes Round
- Boeing-Boeing
- Cotton Patch Gospel
- Corpse
- Buddy: The Buddy Holly Story
- The Mikado
- 42nd Street
- Give My Regards To Broadway
- Twist and Shout: The British Invasio
- Beauty and the Beast
- Lend Me A Tenor

== 2004 season ==
- 42nd Street
- Tons of Money
- Moments To Remember
- Fiddler on the Roof
- A Closer Walk With Patsy Cline
- The Secret Garden
- Swing!
- The Cemetery Club
- Man of La Mancha
- Leader of the Pack
- It Runs In The Family

== 2003 season ==
- Annie Get Your Gun
- Caught In The Net
- Canadian Toonie
- Vaudeville!
- Big River
- Over The River and Through The Woods
- Carousel
- Buddy: The Buddy Holly Story
- Joseph and the Amazing Technicolor Dreamcoat
- Moments To Remember
- A Closer Walk With Patsy Cline
- Triple Espresso

== 2002 season ==
- Anything Goes
- Give My Regards To Broadway
- Shear Madness
- Joseph and the Amazing Technicolor Dreamcoat
- Move Over, Mrs. Markham
- Brighton Beach Memoirs
- Pirates of Penzance
- Weekend Comedy
- Buddy: The Buddy Holly Story
- Canadian Loonie

== 2001 season ==
- Little Me
- A Bit Between The Teeth
- No Sex Please, We're British
- Evita
- Dads: The Musical
- The Music Man
- You'll Get Used To It: The War Show
- It Runs In The Family
- The Boyfriend
- Swingtime Canteen
- Forever Plaid
- Shear Madness

== 2000 season ==
- Vaudeville
- Over The River and Through The Woods
- Damn Yankees
- The Rainmaker
- Lend Me A Tenor
- It Runs In The Family
- A Closer Walk With Patsy Cline

== 1999 season ==
- Don't Dress for Dinner
- Bye Bye Broadway
- The Nerd
- Dames at Sea
- Suds
- Shear Madness
- The Affections of May

== 1998 season ==
- Show Stoppers!
- A Bedfull of Foreigners
- The Wild Guys
- Blood Brothers

== 1997 season ==
- The Sunshine Boys
- Run For Your Wife
- Romance/Romance
- A Flea In Her Ear

== 1996 season ==
- She Loves Me
- Bending the Bows
- Opening Night
- You'll Get Used To It: The War Show

== 1995 season ==
- Big River
- Out of Order
- Dads: The Musical

== 1994 season ==
- Swing!
- The Affections of May
- Nunsense

== 1993 season ==
- Me and My Girl
- It Runs In The Family
- Lend Me A Tenor

== 1992 season ==
- Hurray for Hollywood!
- Move Over, Mrs. Markham
- The Mikado

== 1991 season ==
- Vaudeville!
- Brighton Beach Memoirs
- Pirates of Penzance
