= Steph La Rochelle =

Canadian actress and singer

- Born: Stephanie La Rochelle; Ottawa, Ontario, Canada
- Occupations: Singer, songwriter, actress
- Years active: 2012–present

Stephanie La Rochelle is a Canadian singer, songwriter, and actress. She first became known for finishing in second-place on the 2012 Canadian reality television series Over the Rainbow. Since then, La Rochelle has released an EP Wildflower, which is nominated for a Juno Award for Adult Contemporary Album of the Year at the 2024 Juno Awards. La Rochelle also originated the role of Zoe Murphy in the Canadian production of Dear Evan Hansen, which played at the Royal Alexandra Theatre in 2019.

== Early life ==
La Rochelle is from Ottawa, Ontario, and attended St. Mark Catholic High School in Manotick.

== Career ==
In 2012, La Rochelle auditioned for Over the Rainbow, a Canadian reality competition based on the 2010 BBC series of the same name. The winner would star in the role of Dorothy in a new production of Andrew Lloyd Webber's new stage musical of The Wizard of Oz at the Ed Mirvish Theatre. La Rochelle was named one of the top ten contestants by Lloyd Webber. La Rochelle finished in second place behind winner Danielle Wade.

She subsequently had various acting roles. This included guest appearances on Heartland, where she played a young homeless aspiring country singer who was performing on the streets as a busker. La Rochelle also appeared in the 2017 series Played, and in several episodes during the second season of Backstage.

In 2019, La Rochelle made her professional stage debut as Zoe Murphy in the Canadian premiere production of Dear Evan Hansen. The musical opened at the Royal Alexandra Theatre, before closing on July 21, 2019. Later that same year, La Rochelle reprised her role of Zoe Murphy for the North American tour of Dear Evan Hansen until the tour was suspended due to the COVID-19 pandemic. She rejoined the tour once performances resumed in 2021, before leaving the tour in June 2022. La Rochelle made her West End debut, where she joined the production as Zoe Murphy for a limited run in Dear Evan Hansen.

In October 2022, La Rochelle released Wildflower, her debut recording.

== Credits ==
=== Television ===
Show	Title	Role	Notes
2012	Over the Rainbow	Herself	Second place
2015	Heartland	Brooke	Episode S8.E12: "Broken Heartland"
2017	Played	Willow	Main role
2017	Backstage	Frances O'Connell	12 episodes
2018	Zombie at 17	Jasmine Mandeville	TV film
2019	In the Dark	Weed dealer	Episode S1.E7: "The One That Got Away"

=== Film ===
Year	Title	Role	Notes
2015	The Preacher's Sin	Tinsley Traggert	

=== Theatre ===
Year	Production	Role	Theatre	Category	Ref.
2019	Dear Evan Hansen	Zoe Murphy	Royal Alexandra Theatre	Canadian production / Mirvish Productions	
2019–2022	Dear Evan Hansen	Zoe Murphy	First National Tour		
2022	Dear Evan Hansen	Zoe Murphy	Noël Coward Theatre	West End	
