= Oscar Natzka =

New Zealand opera singer (1912–-1951)

Oscar Natzka (15 June 1912 – 4 November 1951) was a New Zealand operatic singer.

== Early life ==
Born as Franz Oscar Natzke (as he was sometimes credited earlier in his career) at Wharepūhunga in the Waikato district of New Zealand, he was the son of August Natzke (a native of Brixen, a German-speaking part of Italy), who had emigrated to New Zealand and settled in Ōtorohanga, and Emma Carter Natzke, of Christchurch, New Zealand, who was a singer.

As a boy, the young Natzke worked on his father's farm; he was encouraged and trained as a singer by his mother. The family was displaced by the recession of the 1920s to Waiheke Island, where Oscar sang as a boy soprano in concerts. At the age of 15 he was apprenticed to a blacksmith at Freemans Bay, Auckland, where he worked for 3½ years; he later worked for a phosphate company.

== Career ==
When his voice broke, he was encouraged to study overseas. He became a basso profondo and soon became well known. He was aided early in his career by Homer Samuels, husband of Amelita Galli-Curci; John Brownlee, the Australian baritone; and Anderson Tyrer, conductor of the New Zealand National Orchestra. Around this time he changed his name to Oscar Natzka.

In 1935 he went to London, England to study under Albert Garcia, grandson of Manuel Garcia Jr. and former pupil of his great-aunt Pauline Viardot. In 1938, after being discovered by opera director Vladimir Rosing, he made his debut with The Royal Opera, Covent Garden, and went on to enjoy a career on the operatic circuit. He appeared in the musical revue Meet the Navy during the 1940s and its 1946 film adaptation.

== Personal life ==
He married Winifred Jean Clements, from Auckland, in 1941.

Natzka died on 4 November 1951 in New York City, aged 39, after collapsing on stage on 23 October 1951 during a performance of Die Meistersinger at the New York City Opera.

His widow, Winifred, later married the Oscar-winning American actor, Charles Coburn.
