= Alex Mustakas =

Canadian actor and Theatre Director

- Occupations: Director, producer, actor
- Title: Founder & CEO, Drayton Entertainment
- Partner: Jackie Mustakas
- Children: Hadley and Lukas Mustakas
- Website: www.draytonentertainment.com

Alex Mustakas is a Canadian actor and theatre director. He is the founding Artistic Director of Drayton Entertainment, a not-for-profit professional theatre company based in Southwestern Ontario. His current title is Founder and CEO.

== Early life ==
Mustakas was born in Cyprus and emigrated to Canada at the age of six, the middle of three children. After watching his parents struggle as immigrants in a new country, his values of giving back were formed after they received help through the Greek-Cypriot community which he calls vital association. One of his first jobs as a teenager was working for his parents, serving coffee at the Bus Terminal Coffee Shop in Downtown Galt in Cambridge. While attending Eastwood Collegiate, he was a soccer and basketball star but it was apparent he was a performer at heart and drawn to the stage. Teachers encouraged him to attend the National Theatre School but that was not a path approved by his family. They were adamant that he attend university and study business.

After earning a business degree from Wilfrid Laurier University, Mustakas became gainfully employed in the corporate sector. While thriving in the business world he privately studied voice with Victor Martens and continued to perform with Kitchener-Waterloo Musical Productions. It was there he met Alan Lund, Artistic Director of the famed Charlottetown Festival. He decided he wanted to pursue a career as a professional performer.

Following a few years on stage, Mustakas became interested in theatre administration and pursued a master's degree in Arts Administration at City University in London. While in England, he worked on a project for Gresham College where he evaluated data concerning A Historical Examination of Industrial Support for the Arts in the United Kingdom. When he returned to Canada he launched the Drayton Festival Theatre in 1991 out of a tiny, virtually unused theatre in the crossroads community of Drayton, Ontario. These were the first steps towards what is now known as Drayton Entertainment.

== Drayton Entertainment ==
As popularity grew in Drayton, and the community continued to support the venture, a second stage was added in St. Jacobs – The Schoolhouse Theatre. The King's Wharf Theatre in Penetanguishene followed suit in 1999. Nestled within Discovery Harbour on Georgian Bay, the rustic theatre was a perfect complement with the venues in Drayton and St. Jacobs. On the outskirts of Grand Bend, the Huron Country Playhouse which meant summer theatre to so many, joined the Drayton Entertainment family of theatres in 2001. To commemorate its 40th anniversary in 2011, the theatre completed a major renovation, expanding the intimate Huron Country Playhouse II auditorium. Located in the heart of Waterloo Region's Market District, the St. Jacobs Country Playhouse opened to instant acclaim in 2005 and operates year-round in this popular tourism mecca. The most recent venue, Hamilton Family Theatre Cambridge (formerly the Dunfield Theatre Cambridge) Cambridge opened in 2013. Located in the historic community of Galt, the complex includes a 500-seat theatre alongside multiple rehearsal halls, as well as administration, props, wardrobe, and production facilities for Drayton Entertainment.

Drayton Entertainment does not receive annual operating funding from federal or provincial governments, nor their respective arts councils. Annual attendance exceeds 250,000. This makes Drayton Entertainment one of the largest professional theatre companies in Canada. It is also recognized by Canadian Actors' Equity Association as one of the largest employers of professional artists in Canada.

== Major credits ==
=== Director ===
Mustakas has directed over 125 productions for Drayton Entertainment and other companies across Canada, including You'll Get Used To It .. The War Show, the Canadian premiere of Rocky: The Musical (2019) and the world premiere of Marathon of Hope: The Musical (2016) – a musical about the life and legacy of Terry Fox. Other directing credits outside of Drayton Entertainment include Rock of Ages at Casino Niagara, the Toronto engagement of Million Dollar Quartet, the North American touring engagement of Dirty Rotten Scoundrels (2008-2009), Twist & Shout: The British Invasion (2008) and Legends (2010) at The Grand in London, as well as Rock Legends and Twist & Shout at Chemainus Festival Theatre, Vancouver Island. He has also directed productions for The Piggery in North Hatley, Quebec; Lighthouse Festival Theatre in Port Dover; Stage West in Mississauga; Theatre Aquarius in Hamilton; Waterloo Region and Toronto Gilbert & Sullivan Societies; K-W Musical Productions and many more.

=== Producer ===
He has also served as producer for a number of productions including Top Dogs, Just for Laughs Festival, Montreal (2010), Official North American touring engagement of Godspell (2013), Official North American touring engagement of Camelot (2009–2010) and the official North American touring engagement of Dirty Rotten Scoundrels (2008–2009).

=== Actor ===
Mustakas has many acting credits to his name including the Drayton Entertainment roles of Franklin Hart (9 to 5 The Musical), The Pirate King (Pirates of Penzance), Captain Hook (Peter Pan), Tito Merelli (Lend Me a Tenor) and Nick (Over the River and Through The Woods). Most recently he appeared as Don Quixote in the 2018 production of Man of La Mancha.

== Education ==
Mustakas earned a B.A. in Business from Wilfrid Laurier University. He went on to earn his M.A. in Arts Administration from City University in London England. He later received an Honorary Doctorate in Literature from Wilfrid Laurier University.

== Professional awards and accomplishments ==
Year	Award or Accomplishment
2022	Queen Elizabeth II Platinum Jubilee Pin
2017	Meritorious Service Medal (Civil Division), presented by His Excellency the Right Honourable David Johnston, Governor General of Canada
2013	EY National Special CitationsSpecial Citation for Outstanding Community Partnerships, Ernst and Young LLP
2013	EOY Ontario WinnersErnst and Young Entrepreneur of the Year - Media & Entertainment, Ernst and Young LLP
2013	Ernst and Young Entrepreneur of the YearFinalist, Ernst and Young LLP
2012	Queen Elizabeth II Diamond Jubilee Medal
2011	100 Alumni of Achievement, Wilfrid Laurier University In recognition of the university's centennial celebrations
2011	Small Business Partnership of the Year, The Globe and Mail Business for the Arts
2009	Maggie Bassett Award, Theatre Ontario In recognition of outstanding contribution to theatre in Ontario
2008	Most Excellent Innovation (Grand Prize) and Strategic Positioning Innovation Award Ontario Innovation Excellence Awards
2007	Legacy of Leaders Award, City of Waterloo
2004	Honorary Doctor of Letters, Wilfrid Laurier University
2004	Man of the Year, United Way of Kitchener-Waterloo
2004	6 Lieutenant Governor’s Award for the Arts Presented to arts organizations demonstrating exceptional private sector and community support
2004	Tourism Awards Numerous local awards from markets of Waterloo Region, Wellington County, Huron-Bruce, and Simcoe

== Personal life ==
Mustakas is married to Jackie Mustakas (née Hadley). Jackie is also an actress with a long career with Drayton Entertainment and other theatre companies. The pair have two children Hadley and Lukas. Both children have also been on the stage continuing their family tradition.

== Media ==
- The Record - Waterloo Region entrepreneurs win provincial awards Oct 25 2013
- The Record - From a dusty historic opera hall to a seven-venue success story, Drayton Entertainment celebrates 25 years May 30, 2015
- Cambridge Times - Meritous Service Medal for Drayton Entertainment’s artistic director June 27, 2017
- Toronto Star - Alex Mustakas started with ‘a little opera house’ and turned it into one of Canada’s most successful theatre companies January 2, 2019

== See also ==
- Drayton Entertainment
- Drayton, Ontario
- Alan Lund
