= AJ Bridel =

Canadian actress

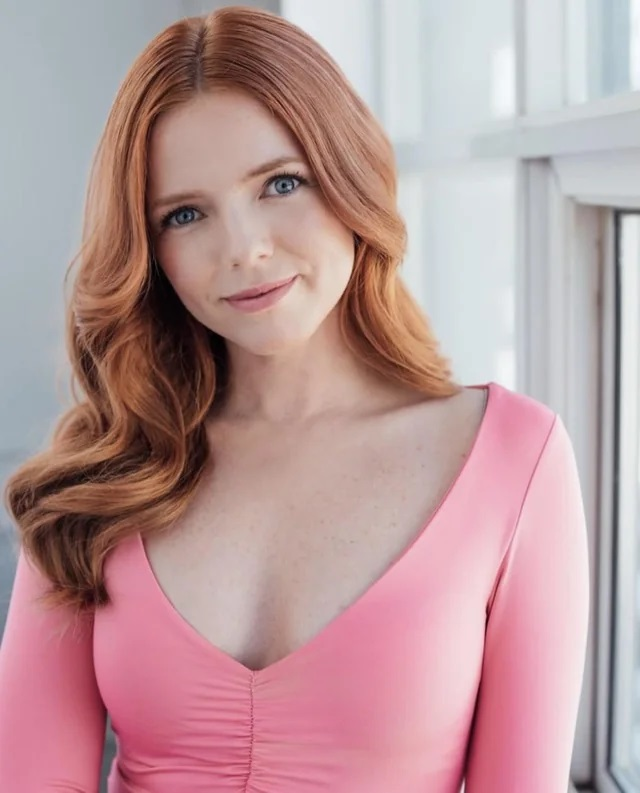
- Bridel in 2024
- Born: Amanda Jeanette Bridel; 26 March 1994 (age 32); Calgary, Alberta, Canada
- Occupation: Actress
- Years active: 2010–present

Amanda Jeannette Bridel (born March 26, 1994), known as AJ Bridel, is a Canadian actress. She first rose to prominence as a finalist on Over the Rainbow, where she finished in third-place. Since then, Bridel originated the role of Lauren in the Canadian premiere of Kinky Boots at the Royal Alexandra Theatre and has appeared in several regional productions across Ontario. In 2022, Bridel started voicing the main character Pipp Petals in the My Little Pony series.

== Early life and education ==
Bridel was born in Calgary, but raised in Kitchener, Ontario. Bridel was first drawn to musical theatre after listening to the music for Les Misérables from a CD owned by her parents. As a teenager, Bridel was a member of the Kitchener Waterloo Musical Productions, a non-profit community theatre organization. She performed in the organization's productions of Fiddler on the Roof, Annie, Footloose, and 13.

Bridel attended Eastwood Collegiate Institute, in Kitchener. An honours student in high school, Bridel enrolled in the musical theatre program at Sheridan College but withdrew to appear on Over the Rainbow. Bridel has since completed courses through Queen's University.

== Career ==
In 2011, at the age of 18, Bridel was cast in her first professional production as Mary in The Little Years, a play by John Mighton. The play was performed at the Stratford Festival between July 13 and September 24, 2011.

In 2012, Bridel auditioned for Over the Rainbow, a Canadian reality competition based on the 2010 BBC series of the same name. The winner of the series would star in the role of Dorothy in a new production of Andrew Lloyd Webber's new stage musical of The Wizard of Oz at the Ed Mirvish Theatre. Following a boot camp held by Lloyd Webber, Bridel was chosen as one of the ten contestants. During the competition, Lloyd Webber commented that "there are probably several roles that I would cast her in right away." On November 4, 2012, Bridel was eliminated in third place.

Bridel was cast as Dorothy Gale in a production of The Wizard of Oz that was produced by Drayton Entertainment in March 2015.

In 2015, Bridel was cast as Lauren in the Canadian production of Kinky Boots, which played at the Royal Alexandra Theatre between June 2015 and May 2016. Bridel appeared on Canada AM, where she performed The History of Wrong Guys, a song her character performs in the show. For her performance as Lauren, Bridel received a nomination for Outstanding Female Performance in a Musical at the 2016 Dora Awards. She also was nominated for and won a 2016 Toronto Theatre Critics Award for Best Supporting Actress in a Musical.

Between 2016 and 2020, Bridel appeared in four Ross Petty Christmas pantomimes. In 2016, Bridel appeared in her first Ross Petty pantomime, where she starred as Sleeping Beauty in Sleeping Beauty. She also appeared in the 2017 production as Jane in A Christmas Carol, which was also filmed and aired on Family Channel and CBC across Canada. Bridel then starred as Maid Marion in the 2019 Ross Petty production of Lil' Red Robin Hood. In 2020, she appeared in There’s No Place Like Home For The Holidays, which was performed as an online revue due to the COVID-19 pandemic.

In 2017, Bridel was named the new Anne in the Charlottetown Festival's production of Anne of Green Gables: The Musical, the longest running annual musical theatre production. Bridel reprised her role of Anne in the 2018 production.

In April 2022, Bridel began starring in the main voice role of Pipp Petals in My Little Pony, replacing Sofia Carson. She currently voices the character in the made-for-YouTube 2D animated series My Little Pony: Tell Your Tale and in the Netflix animated series My Little Pony: Make Your Mark. Bridel also reprised her voice role in the 2022 Netflix animated specials, My Little Pony: Make Your Mark and My Little Pony: Winter Wishday. She also lent her voice to the video game My Little Pony: A Maretime Bay Adventure.

In 2023, Bridel starred as Sherrie in a Canadian production of Rock of Ages that played at the Elgin Theatre between February 23 and May 20, 2023. At the 2023 Dora Awards, Bridel was nominated for Outstanding Performance in a Leading Role. Later that same year, Bridel starred as Claire in the world premiere of Chris Mrs. The musical ran between December 5 and 31, 2023 at the Winter Garden Theatre.

On December 29, 2025, she released her debut single "See You Monday" under the name Amanda Jean, the first single from a forthcoming album inspired by her divorce.

== Personal life ==
In 2018, Bridel was nearly involved in the 2018 Toronto van attack, having been about 5 minutes away when it occurred.

== Theatre credits ==
Year	Production	Role	Theatre	Category	Ref.
2011	The Little Years	Mary	Studio Theatre	Regional / Stratford Festival	
2015	The Wizard of Oz	Dorothy Gale	Dunfield Theatre	Regional / Drayton Entertainment	
2015–2016	Kinky Boots	Lauren	Royal Alexandra Theatre	Toronto / Mirvish Productions	
2016	Mamma Mia!	Sophie Sheridan	Capitol Theatre	Regional	
2016	Sleeping Beauty	Sleeping Beauty	Elgin Theatre	Regional / Ross Petty Productions	
2017	Anne of Green Gables: The Musical	Anne Shirley	Regional / Charlottetown Festival		
2017	A Christmas Carol	Jane	Elgin Theatre	Regional / Ross Petty Productions	
2018	Anne of Green Gables: The Musical	Anne Shirley	Regional / Charlottetown Festival		
2019	You'll Get Used To It...The War Show	Woman 1, Various characters	St. Jacobs Country Playhouse	Regional / Drayton Entertainment	
2019	Lil' Red Robin Hood	Maid Marion	Winter Garden Theatre	Regional / Ross Petty Productions	
2020	Kinky Boots	Lauren	Hamilton Family Theatre	Regional / Drayton Entertainment	
2020	There’s No Place Like Home For The Holidays	Holiday Spirit	Virtual revue	Regional / Ross Petty Productions	
2022	The Last Five Years	Cathy Hiatt	The Geary Studio	Toronto / Olive Branch Theatre	
2022	Mamma Mia!	Sophie Sheridan	St. Jacobs Country Playhouse	Regional / Drayton Entertainment	
2023	Rock of Ages	Sherrie	Elgin Theatre	Regional / More Entertainment Group	
2023	Kinky Boots	Lauren	Hamilton Family Theatre	Regional / Drayton Entertainment	
2023	Chris, Mrs.	Claire Chris	Winter Garden Theatre	Toronto: World premiere	
2024	Rosamund	Princess Rosamund	Jeanne Lamon Hall	Toronto: Fringe Festival	
2025	Grease	Sandy Dumbrowski	Drayton Festival Theatre / King's Wharf Theatre	Regional / Drayton Entertainment	
2025	Cinderella: The Panto	Buttons	St. Jacobs Country Playhouse / Huron Country Playhouse / King's Wharf Theatre	Regional / Drayton Entertainment	
2026	Pinocchio	Narrator, Schoolmistress & Barmaid	Four Seasons Centre for the Performing Arts	The National Ballet of Canada	
2026	Disney’s Frozen	Anna	Hamilton Family Theatre / Huron Country Playhouse	Regional / Drayton Entertainment	
2026	Jonas and Barry in the Home	Rosie Voight	Hildebrand Schoolhouse Theatre St. Jacobs	Regional / Drayton Entertainment	

== Filmography ==
=== Television ===
Year	Title	Role	Notes
2012	Over the Rainbow	Herself	Third-place finalist
2018	A Christmas Carol	Jane	Television special
2020	Odd Squad	Sister Sally #2	2 episodes
2020	Private Eyes	Tiffany	Episode: "Tappa Kegga Daily"
2021	Glowbies	Sixty	Main role (voice)
2022	Murdoch Mysteries	Susan Halliday	Episode: "There's Something About Mary"
2022	Super Wish	Princess Sparkletwirl	Episodes 17, 24
2022–2023	My Little Pony: Make Your Mark	Pipp Petals	Main role (voice)
2022–2024	My Little Pony: Tell Your Tale	Pipp Petals	Main role (voice)
2022	My Little Pony: Make Your Mark	Pipp Petals	Netflix animated special
2022	My Little Pony: Winter Wishday	Pipp Petals	Netflix animated special
2023	My Little Pony: Bridlewoodstock	Pipp Petals	Netflix animated special
2023	Accused	Female Supporter #3	Episode S1.E7: "Brenda's Story"
2023	Blue's Clues & You!	Firetruck	Episode S4.E9: "Firefighter Blue to the Rescue!"
2023	Fellow Travelers	Madeline	

=== Film ===
Year	Title	Role	Notes
2014	Shelby	Chloe	

=== Audiobooks ===
Year	Title	Role	Notes	Ref.
2019	Out of the Shadows	Narrator		
2021	The Dollhouse: A Ghost Story	Narrator		
2022	Prague	Narrator		
2022	Every Summer After	Narrator		
2023	Meet Me At The Lake	Narrator		
2024	This Summer Will Be Different	Narrator		
2024	Known To Be The Victim	Narrator		
2024	Make Me A Mixtape	Narrator		
2025	One Golden Summer	Narrator		

=== Video games ===
Year	Title	Role	Notes	Ref.
2022	My Little Pony: A Maretime Bay Adventure	Pipp Petals		

== Awards and nominations ==
Year	Award	Category	Nominated work	Result	Ref.
2015	BroadwayWorld Award	Best Leading Actress in a Musical	Kinky Boots	Won	
2016	Dora Awards	Outstanding Female Performance in a Musical	Kinky Boots	Nominated	
2016	Toronto Theatre Critics Award	Best Supporting Actress in a Musical	Kinky Boots	Won	
2023	Dora Awards	Outstanding Leading Performance in a Musical	Rock of Ages	Nominated	
2023	ACTRA Toronto Award	Outstanding Performance: Gender Non-Conforming or Female Voice	My Little Pony: Make Your Mark	Nominated	
