= Gleneagle Secondary School =

Public high school in Coquitlam, Canada

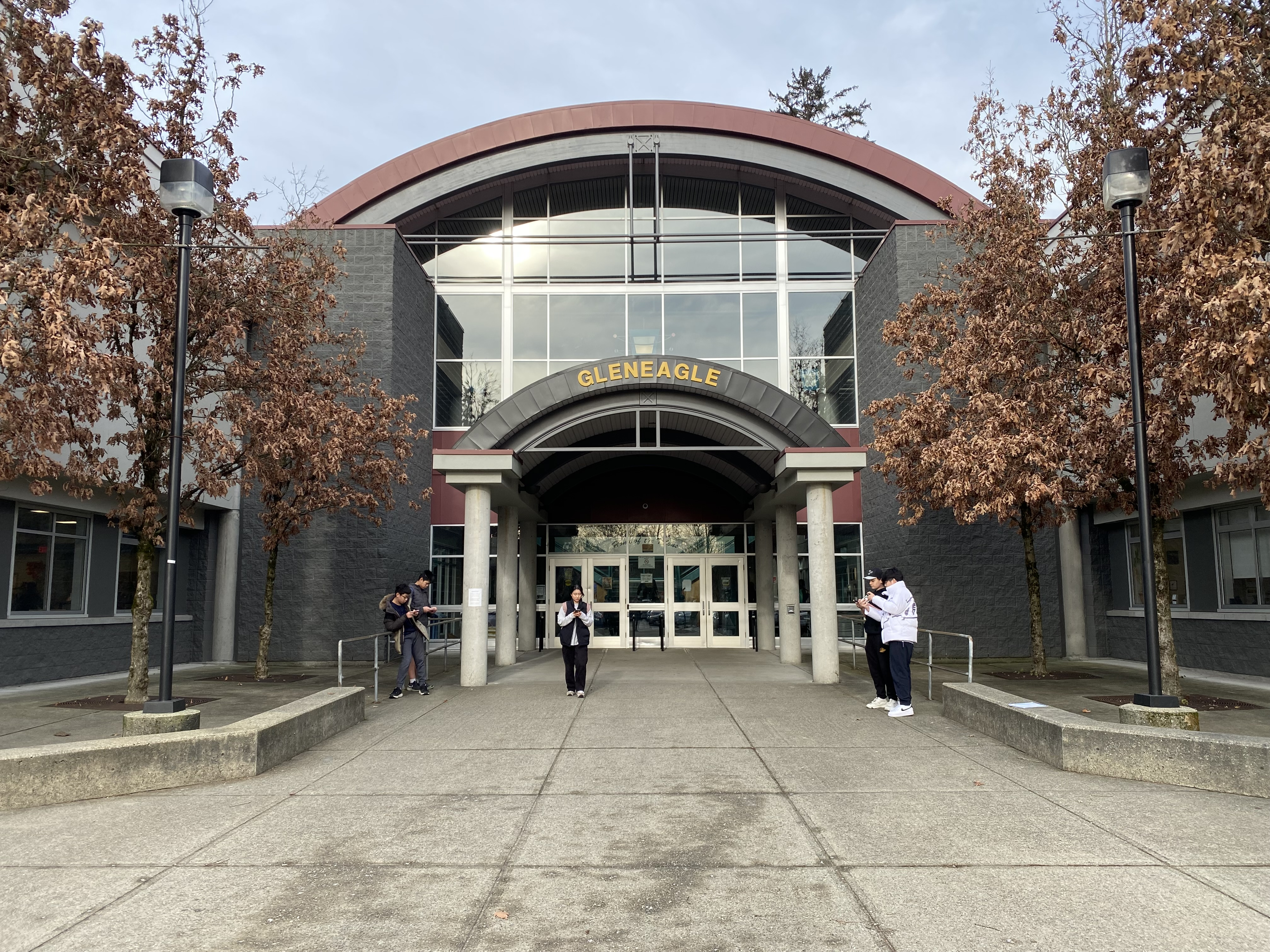

Location
- 1195 Lansdowne Drive; Coquitlam, British Columbia, V3B 7Y8; Canada; 49°17′03″N 122°48′24″W

Information
- School type: Co-educational Public Secondary
- Motto: Once a Talon, Always a Talon
- Established: 1997
- School board: School District 43 Coquitlam
- Superintendent: Robert Zambrano
- School number: 125
- Principal: Mark Clay
- Staff: 120
- Grades: 9 to 12
- Enrollment: 1170 (2024/2025)
- Language: English
- Area: Coquitlam
- Colours: Black, White, & Gold
- Mascot: Terry the Talon
- Team name: Talons
- Newspaper: The Edge
- Website: www.gleneagle.org

Gleneagle Secondary School, or simply Gleneagle, is a public coeducational high school located in Coquitlam, British Columbia, established in 1997. It is run by School District 43 Coquitlam. Gleneagle serves grades 9-12 and has an enrolment of 1170 students.

In addition to academic programs, Gleneagle offers specialty programs such as ACE-IT Culinary Arts and Hairdressing, the COAST outdoor education program, the grade 9 JumpstART art program, and the school district's TALONS gifted program.

As of the 2013-14 school year Gleneagle ranked 80 out of 293 by the Fraser Institute with a rating of 7.1, down from previous years. Gleneagle has one of the highest rates of student acceptance to post secondary education among BC's high schools, with more than 50% of graduates entering a Public Post-Secondary Institution in British Columbia.

== History ==
The site for Gleneagle had been set aside for more than 15 years and the school had been expected to open its doors in 1993, yet had been postponed for several years due to funding shortfalls. In 1995, for a second year in a row, provincial funds from the education ministry were not allocated for the $25 million construction, potentially resulting in 3000 high school students being relegated to portable classrooms within two years. Protests from local parents resulted in signs being affixed to the chain link fence surrounding the site and parents and children waving posters and placards at passing motorists on one of the busiest intersections serving Coquitlam's northwest neighborhoods. In October, 1995, a local parent group, P.E.A.C.E. (Parents Expecting Adequate Funding for Construction and Education), began selling imaginary bricks for $2 each in a fundraiser that was supported unanimously in a vote by the school board. By the end of 1995 they had raised over $10,000 towards the $25 million cost. The "Buy a Brick - Build a School" campaign resulted in funds being released in the 1996/97 capital budget for education in April 1996 with an announcement by Port Coquiltam MLA, Mike Farnsworth. Gleneagle Secondary School was officially opened on September 2, 1997 with 1200 students from grades 9-11.

== Notable programs ==
Several notable programs are offered that are either unique only to Gleneagle or only at select schools in the district.

=== T.A.L.O.N.S. program ===
The T.A.L.O.N.S. program (The Academy of Learning for Outstanding, Notable Students) is a two-year program for gifted students in grades 9 and 10 focusing on interdisciplinary and autonomous learning. Application to the program is only available for district identified gifted students currently in grade 8 with application beginning in December of each year.

=== JumpstART 9 ===
JumpstART 9 is a thematic program integrating Humanities (English 9 and Social Studies 9) and the Fine Arts in a yearlong morning program.

=== C.O.A.S.T program ===
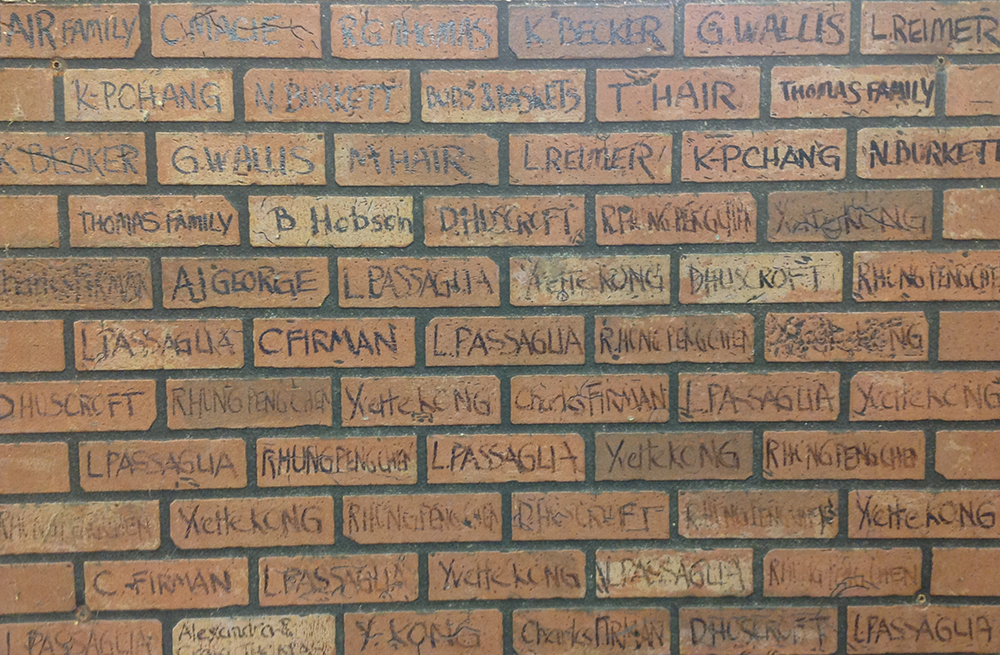
A section of the wall for the 'Buy a Brick - Build a School" campaign.

The C.O.A.S.T program (Coquitlam Outdoor Academic School Term) consists of one semester of regular classes where students take Math, Science 10, and two electives. The secondary semester the students meet as a single group that study English 10, Social Studies 10 with integrated Field Studies, Planning 10 Online, Physical Education 10 and 11, and Leadership 11 while gaining certifications in St. John's First Aid, Flatwater Level One from the Recreational Canoeing Association of British Columbia, and Rock Climbing Belay. Students participate in various outings during the semester and on weekends including back country snowshoeing and camping, cross country skiing, rock climbing, mountain biking, kayaking, and canoeing.

=== ACE-IT programs ===
Gleneagle offers two apprenticeship programs of technical training under the format of an ACE-IT program (Accelerated Credit Enrollment in Industry Training) in Cook Training and Hairdressing that provide Level I certification.

=== Headstart to Art ===
In conjunction with the Emily Carr University of Art and Design, Gleneagle functions as a satellite campus offering courses in Foundations courses.

=== The Edge ===
Gleneagle produces a student-run newspaper known as The Edge. The newspaper is produced by the Journalism 11/12 class, and was founded in 1997. It has won a number of awards from the Quill and Scroll Society, such as the International First Place Award and the George H. Gallup Award. The most recent award received was the 2014 International First Place Award.

=== Summer learning ===
Most core courses are available, especially those required for graduation. Students may take up to two courses with a refundable deposit of $100 each. Courses can be face-to-face or a combination of online and traditional learning (FastTrack). In 2015 it was reported that 1400 students were enrolled for the summer session, a higher density than the 2014/15 10-month school year.

== Performing arts ==
Gleneagle has a music and theatre program that have won several awards and put on several performance throughout the year.

=== Drama & musical theatre ===
Broken Wing Theatre was the name given to the theatre program at Gleneagle by Richard Dixon. The school has presented more than 300 scripted plays and musicals since it opened in 1997. In addition to a number of plays performed by acting classes, extracurricular plays are presented in the fall and spring; as well as the annual school musical also presented in the spring. Broken Wing Theatre often practiced Black Box Theatre with minimal basic sets, music, and lighting for the acting classes, so as to speed up the rate of production and to focus resources on actor training and learning by participating, rather than reading about it or spending time creating sets. The use of scripts is a constant in Broken Wing Theatre's approach to acting: at any given point, all actors in the program are either rehearsing or performing scripted plays, musicals, scenes, or monologues.

The theatre at Gleneagle is no longer known as Broken Wing Theatre, since Richard Dixon retired in 2009 and was succeeded by Ashley Freeborn. Freeborn's productions drifted far from the black box theatre approach and Gleneagle is now known for its set design and visually appealing big productions. Freeborn was succeeded in 2015 by Amy Clausen, who took over during the pre production of Beauty and the Beast (2016.) Clausen was succeeded by Zelda Coertze after the auditions for Sister Act in 2017. Coertze was succeeded in 2018 by Justin Maller at the start of the 2018-2019 school year. Notable productions of the past include: The Grapes of Wrath (play), Parfumerie (play), The Actor's Nightmare (play), The Wizard Of Oz, Seussical (musical), Thoroughly Modern Millie, Footloose, Shrek the Musical, Beauty and the Beast, Guys and Dolls, Sister Act, West Side Story as well as a number of student-written and director-written/adapted plays. Notable alumni of the theatre program at Gleneagle Secondary have gone on to attend widely well-regarded theatre schools all around the world such as Studio 58 in Vancouver, Randolph Academy in Toronto, and Circle In The Square Theatre School in New York City.

=== Music Department ===
The Gleneagle Music department has travelled and toured extensively to locations such as New York City, Cuba, Disneyland, Powell River, and Whistler for festivals and competitions. The department, originally led by Brent Hughes and succeeded by Edward Trovato in 2009, has won numerous awards and received numerous accolades through the years.

== Sports & athletics ==
Gleneagle's athletic program has resulted in over 150 championships with 110 Coquitlam District Championships, 26 Fraser Valley Championships, 16 Provincial Championships, and the first school in District 43 to win the BC School Sports Outstanding School Achievement Award from BC School Sports in 2005.

== Notable alumni ==
- Sean Aiken
- Jennifer Gillis
- Neil Grayston
- Taylor Kitsch is a Canadian actor and model. He is best known for his work in films and television shows, such as X-Men Origins: Wolverine (2009), Battleship (2012), John Carter (2012), Savages (2012), Lone Survivor (2013), and Waco (2018).
- Nikohl Boosheri is an actress best known for her role in the 2011 film Circumstance, and the television series The Bold Type.
