= Meet the Navy (film) =

- Theatrical release poster
- Directed by: Alfred Travers
- Screenplay by: Lester Cooper; James Seymour
- Story by: Lester Cooper
- Produced by: Louis H. Jackson
- Starring: Lionel Murton; Margaret Hurst; Robert John Pratt
- Cinematography: Ernest Palmer; Geoffrey Unsworth (Technicolor sequence)
- Edited by: Lito Carruthers
- Music by: Eric Wild; Ronnie Munro
- Production company: British National Films
- Distributed by: Anglo-American Film Corporation (UK)
- Release date: 2 September 1946 (UK)
- Running time: 85 minutes
- Country: United Kingdom
- Language: English

Meet the Navy is a 1946 British musical comedy film directed by Alfred Travers and starring Lionel Murton, Margaret Hurst and Robert John Pratt. It was written by Lester Cooper and James Seymour based on the Canadian musical revue Meet the Navy, and filmed in England in November 1945 by British National Films.

== Plot ==
The plot concerns a musical troupe who entertain sailors from the Royal Canadian Navy during World War II, and the film shows their personal history and experiences. The film concludes with a Technicolor sequence, with the cast involved in a Royal Command Performance for an audience including a young Princess Elizabeth.

== Cast ==
- Lionel Murton as Johnny
- Margaret Hurst as Midge
- Robert John Pratt as Horace
- Robert Goodier as Tommy
- Phyllis Hudson as Jenny
- Percy Haynes as Cook
- Bill Oliver as C.P.O. Oliver
- Jeanette De Hueck as Gracie
- Oscar Natzke as fisherman
- Alan Lund as dancer
- Billy Mae Richards as dancer

== Reception ==
=== Box office ===
According to Kine Weekly, the "biggest winner" at the British box office for 1946 was The Wicked Lady, but Meet the Navy was listed among the other top performers.

=== Critical ===
The Monthly Film Bulletin wrote: "With an uninspired script telling a confused narrative, the fictionalised version of this successful stage show depends very largely on the production numbers which form its final section and are in Technicolor. The monochrome sequences appear to include many library shots which are painfully impaired by stage lighting and stage make-up. But the Technicolor version of some of the Hippodrome scenes brightens up."

Kine Weekly wrote: "The path leading up to the all-Technicolor finale is paved with authentic vignettes of war at sea and at the base, and these provide showmanlike settings for comedy, romance, song and dance ensembles. The dexterous editing is a fitting compliment to the excellent teamwork. As for the finale itself, it takes the form of 'gay nineties' seaside revelry and has all the colour and lilting rhythm of the best American musical. A grand, adroitly balanced service frolic, it should click with all classes."

Allmovie's description reads: "Virtually plotless, the British Meet the Navy is not so much a film as a musical revue. Which is as it should be, since the film is based on the Royal Canadian Navy stage show of the same name, originally put together by radio musical arranger Louis Silvers and choreographer Larry Ceballos. Like its Hollywood predecessor This Is the Army, Meet the Navy is so smooth and professional-looking that one doubts the publicity claims that the cast was composed entirely of talented amateurs. Few of the cast members went on to illustrious careers, though most were certainly capable of doing so."

TV Guide awarded the film two out of four stars, calling it an "entertaining British musical."
