= Over the Rainbow (Canadian TV series) =

- Genre: Reality
- Directed by: Joan Tosoni
- Presented by: Daryn Jones
- Judges: Andrew Lloyd Webber; Arlene Phillips; Thom Allison; Louise Pitre
- No. of seasons: 1
- No. of episodes: 17

Production
- Executive producers: Don Weiner; Ivan Schneeberg; David Fortier; Gerry McKean
- Producer: Mel Balac
- Running time: 40–90 minutes
- Production company: Temple Street Productions

Original release
- Network: CBC Television, CBC HD
- Release: September 16 – November 5, 2012

Over the Rainbow is a Canadian reality talent competition that premiered on CBC Television on September 16, 2012. Based on the 2010 series Over the Rainbow in the United Kingdom, the series auditioned aspiring musical theatre performers for the role of Dorothy for a Toronto production of Andrew Lloyd Webber's stage musical adaptation of The Wizard of Oz. The series was hosted by Daryn Jones. Arlene Phillips, Thom Allison, and Louise Pitre served as judges alongside Webber.

The competition began with a Dorothy "boot camp" run by Lloyd Webber, which trained contestants and eliminated all but 10 finalists. Following a public telephone vote on 4 November 2012, 20-year-old Danielle Wade was chosen as Dorothy to perform the role for Mirvish Productions in Toronto, which started on 20 December 2012. Wade has played several leading roles in student and community theatre and is an acting major at the University of Windsor. The judges praised her as "a consistently solid performer with a big voice and girl-next-door likeability and charm".

The show also auditioned Canadian dogs for the part of Toto. CBC and Weber did not restrict the breed of Toto to Cairn Terrier (as used in the 1939 film), but instead searched for a dog that embodies the spirit of Toto: One that is a "bright fun loving companion full of energy and charisma". The winner was a small mixed breed dog named Linzy, that looks similar to the film's Toto, owned by Reta Thompson. However, Linzy did not appear in the stage production.

== Finalists ==
Ten contestants made it through the audition rounds and performed during the live shows.

Finalist	Age*	From	Dress Color	Status
Kelsey Verzotti	17	Calgary, Alberta	Bubble Gum Pink	Eliminated 1st in Week 1
Michelle Bouey	21	Charlottetown, Prince Edward Island	Robin's Egg Blue	Eliminated 2nd in Week 2
Julia Gartha	16	Unionville, Ontario	Purple	Eliminated 3rd in Week 3
Jennifer Gillis	16	Coquitlam, British Columbia	Sky Blue	Eliminated 4th in Week 4
Jessie Munro	17	Toronto, Ontario	Teal	Eliminated 5th in Week 5
Cassandra Hodgins	17	London, Ontario	Yellow	Eliminated 6th in Week 6
Colleen Furlan	19	Winnipeg, Manitoba	Red	Eliminated 7th in Week 7
AJ Bridel	18	Kitchener, Ontario	Orange	Third place
Stephanie La Rochelle	17	Ottawa, Ontario	Kelly Green	Second place
Danielle Wade	20	LaSalle, Ontario	Lime Green	Winner

* at the start of the series

=== Results summary ===
Place	Contestant	Week 1	Week 2	Week 3	Week 4	Week 5	Week 6	Week 7	Final
1	Danielle	Safe	Safe	Safe	Safe	Safe	Safe	Safe	Winner
2	Stephanie	Safe	Safe	Safe	Bottom 2	Safe	Bottom 2	Safe	Runner-up
3	AJ	Safe	Safe	Safe	Safe	Safe	Safe	Bottom 2	Third Place
4	Colleen	Safe	Safe	Safe	Safe	Safe	Safe	Eliminated	Eliminated
5	Cassandra	Safe	Safe	Safe	Safe	Bottom 2	Eliminated	Eliminated	
6	Jessie	Safe	Bottom 2	Bottom 2	Safe	Eliminated	Eliminated		
7	Jennifer	Safe	Safe	Safe	Eliminated	Eliminated			
8	Julia	Bottom 2	Safe	Eliminated	Eliminated				
9	Michelle	Safe	Eliminated	Eliminated					
10	Kelsey	Eliminated	Eliminated						

== Live shows ==
The live shows saw the finalists eliminated one by one following both individual and group performances. At the end of every live show, the losing Dorothy would have her shoes stripped by the Dorothy who survived the sing-off, and the shoes would be given to Lloyd Webber (week 1) and Phillips (weeks 2-7).

=== Week 1 ===
Following the first week of the competition, Kelsey was the first Dorothy to be eliminated from the competition. The show performances were:

- Group performances:
  - "Follow the Yellow Brick Road" (from the musical The Wizard of Oz)
  - "One" (from the musical A Chorus Line)

Contestants' performances on the first live show
Contestant	Performance Pair	Order	Song	Result
Kelsey Verzotti	Pair 1	1	"Good Morning Baltimore"	Bottom 2
Julia Gartha	Pair 1	2	"Make You Feel My Love"	Bottom 2
Cassandra Hodgins	Pair 2	3	"Fever"	Safe
Michelle Bouey	Pair 2	4	"Love Song"	Safe
Danielle Wade	Pair 3	5	"I'll Never Fall in Love Again"	Safe
Jessie Munro	Pair 3	6	"Take That Look Off Your Face"	Safe
Jennifer Gillis	Pair 4	7	"Whistle Down the Wind"	Safe
Colleen Furlan	Pair 4	8	"Fallin'"	Safe
Stephanie La Rochelle	Pair 5	9	"The Climb"	Safe
AJ Bridel	Pair 5	10	"Mambo Italiano"	Safe

Sing-Off

Act	Sing Off Song	Results
Kelsey Verzotti	"What I Did for Love" from A Chorus Line	Eliminated
Julia Gartha	"What I Did for Love" from A Chorus Line	Saved by Lloyd Webber

=== Week 2 ===
The show performances were:

- Group performances:
  - "Ding-Dong! The Witch Is Dead" (from the musical The Wizard of Oz)
  - "Defying Gravity" (from the musical Wicked)

Contestants' performances on the second live show
Contestant	Performance Pair	Order	Song	Result
Colleen Furlan	Pair 1	1	"Call Me Maybe"	Safe
Cassandra Hodgins	Pair 1	2	"Drops of Jupiter (Tell Me)"	Safe
Julia Gartha	Pair 2	3	"Give Your Heart a Break"	Safe
Danielle Wade	Pair 2	4	"There You'll Be"	Safe
Jennifer Gillis	Pair 3	5	"I'll Stand by You"	Safe
Stephanie La Rochelle	Pair 3	6	"Titanium"	Safe
Jessie Munro	Pair 4	7	"Firework"	Bottom 2
AJ Bridel	Pair 4	8	"Angel"	Safe
Michelle Bouey	Solo Performance	9	"When You Believe"	Bottom 2

Sing-Off

Act	Sing Off Song	Results
Jessie Munro	"Another Suitcase in Another Hall" from Evita	Saved by Phillips
Michelle Bouey	"Another Suitcase in Another Hall" from Evita	Eliminated

=== Week 3 ===
The show performances were:

- Group performances:
  - "The Merry Old Land of Oz" (from the musical The Wizard of Oz)
  - "Anything You Can Do" (from the musical Annie Get Your Gun)

Contestants' performances on the third live show
Contestant	Performance Pair	Order	Song	Result
AJ Bridel	Pair 1	1	"One Night Only"	Safe
Cassandra Hodgins	Pair 1	2	"Maybe This Time"	Safe
Colleen Furlan	Pair 2	3	"Legally Blonde"	Safe
Jennifer Gillis	Pair 2	4	"Supercalifragilisticexpialidocious"	Safe
Jessie Munro	Pair 3	5	"The Rose"	Bottom 2
Stephanie La Rochelle	Pair 3	6	"Flashdance... What a Feeling"	Safe
Julia Gartha	Pair 4	7	"The Man That Got Away"	Bottom 2
Danielle Wade	Pair 4	8	"Big Spender"	Safe

Sing-Off

Act	Sing Off Song	Results
Jessie Munro	"As Long as He Needs Me" from Oliver!	Saved by Phillips
Julia Gartha	"As Long as He Needs Me" from Oliver!	Eliminated

=== Week 4 ===
The show performances were:

- Group performances:
  - "If I Only Had a Part" (from the musical The Wizard of Oz)
  - "I Enjoy Being a Girl" (from the musical Flower Drum Song)

Contestants' performances on the fourth live show
Contestant	Order	Song	Result
Cassandra Hodgins	1	"Mercy"	Safe
Jennifer Gillis	2	"Crazy Little Thing Called Love"	Bottom 2
Colleen Furlan	3	"If My Friends Could See Me Now"	Safe
AJ Bridel	4	"True Colors"	Safe
Danielle Wade	5	"Moon River"	Safe
Stephanie La Rochelle	6	"Buenos Aires"	Bottom 2
Jessie Munro	7	"Rolling in the Deep"	Safe

Sing-Off

Act	Sing Off Song	Results
Jennifer Gillis	"Tell Me on a Sunday" from Tell Me on a Sunday	Eliminated
Stephanie La Rochelle	"Tell Me on a Sunday" from Tell Me on a Sunday	Saved by Phillips

=== Week 5 ===
The show performances were:

- Group performances:
  - "Don't Rain on My Parade" (from the musical Funny Girl)
  - "Mamma Mia! Medley" with Louise Pitre

Contestants' performances on the fifth live show
Contestant	Order	Song	Result
Jessie Munro	1	"No More Tears (Enough Is Enough)"	Bottom 2
Danielle Wade	2	"Valerie"	Safe
AJ Bridel	3	"Feeling Good"	Safe
Cassandra Hodgins	4	"Out Here on My Own"	Bottom 2
Colleen Furlan	5	"Could It Be Magic"	Safe
Stephanie La Rochelle	6	"Smile"	Safe

Sing-Off

Act	Sing Off Song	Results
Jessie Munro	"Tell Me It's Not True" from Blood Brothers	Eliminated
Cassandra Hodgins	"Tell Me It's Not True" from Blood Brothers	Saved by Phillips

=== Week 6 ===
The show performances were:

- Group performances:
  - "Together (Wherever We Go)" (from the musical Gypsy)
  - "You Can't Stop the Beat" (from the musical Hairspray)
  - "The Trolley Song" (from the musical Meet Me in St. Louis) with Thom Allison

Contestants' performances on the sixth live show
Contestant	Order	Song	Result
Danielle Wade	1	"At Last"	Safe
Stephanie La Rochelle	2	"Someone Like You"	Bottom 2
AJ Bridel	3	"Nobody Does It Better"	Safe
Colleen Furlan	4	"The First Time Ever I Saw Your Face"	Safe
Cassandra Hodgins	5	"Your Song"	Bottom 2

Sing-Off

Act	Sing Off Song	Results
Stephanie La Rochelle	"On My Own" from Les Misérables	Saved by Phillips
Cassandra Hodgins	"On My Own" from Les Misérables	Eliminated

=== Week 7 ===
The show performances were:

- Group performances:
  - "Don't Stop Believin'" (from the musical Rock of Ages)
  - "Seasons of Love" (from the musical Rent)
  - "Something's Coming" (from the musical West Side Story)

Contestants' performances on the seventh live show
Contestant	Order	Song	Result
Stephanie La Rochelle	1	"Cabaret"	Safe
Colleen Furlan	2	"Somewhere"	Bottom 2
AJ Bridel	3	"All That Jazz"	Bottom 2
Danielle Wade	4	"I Dreamed a Dream"	Safe

Sing-Off

Act	Sing Off Song	Results
Colleen Furlan	"No Matter What" from Whistle Down the Wind	Eliminated
AJ Bridel	"No Matter What" from Whistle Down the Wind	Saved by Phillips

=== Week 8 ===
For their individual performances, the contestants sang songs by Andrew Lloyd Webber.

The show performances were:

- Group performances:
  - "The Wizard of Oz Medley"
  - "Already Home" (from the musical The Wizard of Oz)
  - "Sing" (by Gary Barlow & The Commonwealth Band featuring Military Wives)

Contestants' performances on the eighth live show
Contestant	Order	Andrew Lloyd Webber song	Order	Song of the Season	Result
AJ Bridel	1	"Memory"	N/A	N/A (already eliminated)	Eliminated
Danielle Wade	2	"As If We Never Said Goodbye"	4	"Big Spender"	Winner
Stephanie La Rochelle	3	"I Believe My Heart"	5	"Buenos Aires"	Runner-up
