= John Gennings Curtis Adams =

Canada's father of dental public health

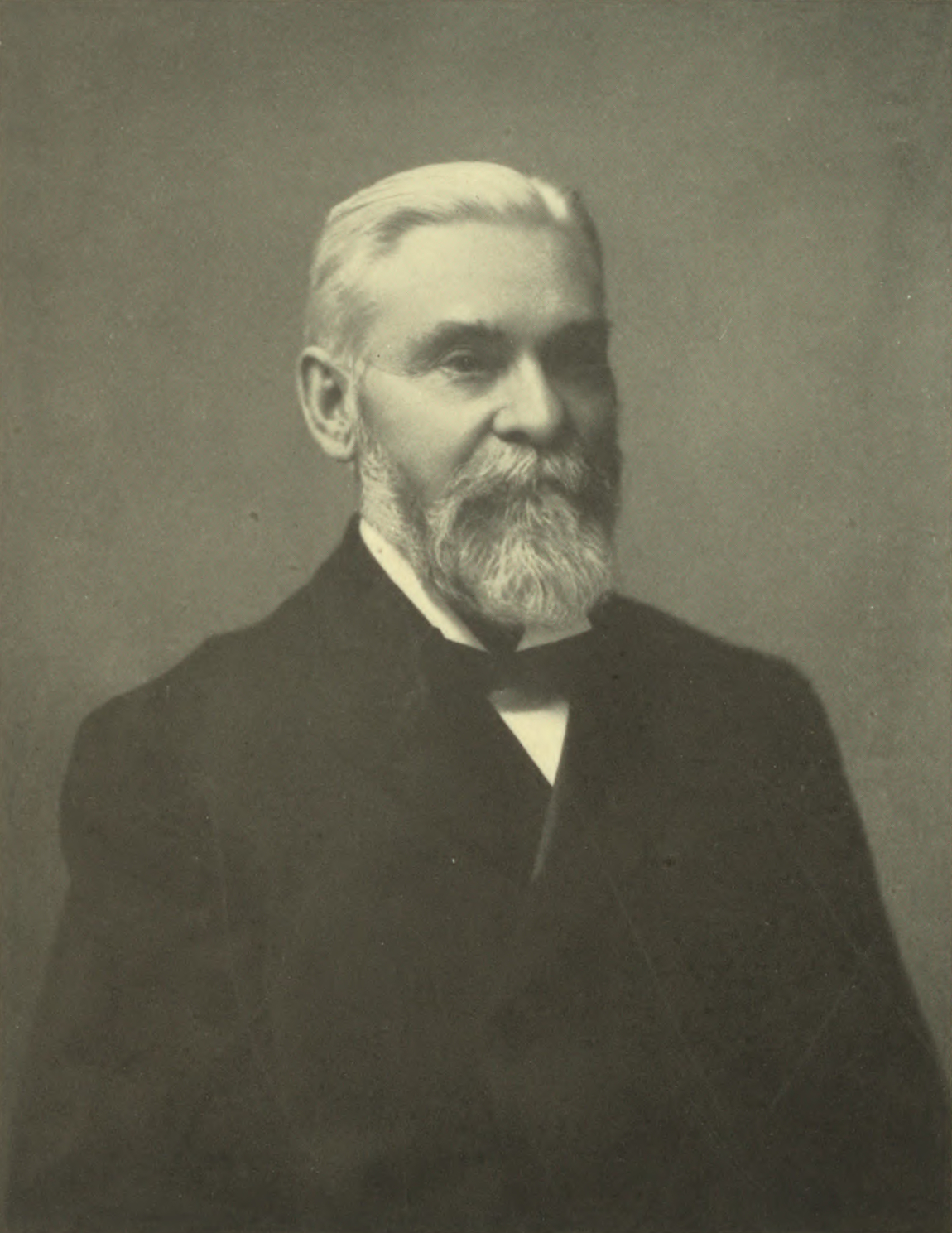
- Portrait of Adams c. 1907
- Born: 16 March 1839; Adamsville, Upper Canada (now Acton, Ontario)
- Died: 21 May 1922 (aged 83); Burlington, Ontario, Canada
- Resting place: Mount Pleasant Cemetery, Toronto
- Known for: Canada's father of dental public health
- Spouse: Sarah Ann Fawcett (m. 1861; died 1897)
- Children: 4 sons, 5 daughters
- Medical career
- Profession: Dentist
- Institutions: The Hospital for Sick Children
- Sub-specialties: Dental public health

Signature
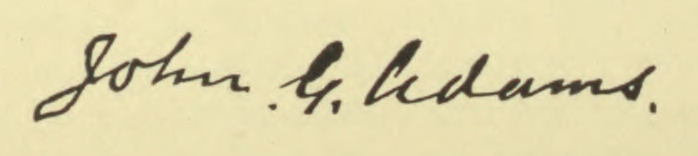

John Gennings Curtis Adams (16 March 1839 – 21 May 1922) was a Canadian farmer, dentist, and reformer who is credited as being Canada's "father of dental public health". Over his career, he had operated a free-of-charge dental clinic for Toronto's poor, served as the first dentist of record at the Hospital for Sick Children, and lobbied the City of Toronto to implement routine dental exams of schoolchildren, as well as to operate the first free public dental clinic in Canada.

A firm believer in the importance of oral health in children, Adams devoted his career to caring for the often neglected teeth of school children. He wrote a paper about the dire state of dental care in children, and lobbied his peers and the municipal government to take action. After his own free dental clinic was shut down by the city due to unpaid taxes, Adams became a dental missionary, travelling around the world to treat the poor and needy. His lobbying efforts paid off, as the Toronto Board of Education began inspecting the teeth of schoolchildren in 1911, and the city opened its own free dental clinic two years later.

== Early life and education ==
Adams was born in Adamsville, Upper Canada, on 16 March 1839, the son of the Rev. Ezra Adams, who was one of the first settlers of Adamsville, and his wife, Amy Edmonds. At the age of five, Adams enrolled on the temperance pledge and committed himself to being a lifelong teetotaler. When Adams was nine, his family moved from Adamsville to a homestead near the township of Drayton. Adams farmed on the homestead in his youth.

On 18 December 1861, Adams married Sarah Ann Fawcett. Both of them believed that God had called them when they were younger to perform philanthropic work for the poor. On 11 May 1870, Adams and his family moved from Drayton to Toronto, believing that he needed to provide dental hospital care for the poor. In Toronto, he studied dentistry under his brother, William Case Adams.

== Career ==
After moving to Toronto with his family, Adams sought out to provide dental care to the city's poor. In 1872, he operated a free-of-charge dental hospital, initially located on Gerrard Street. Adams took any money he earned from his private practive and put it towards the hospital. Adams received his LDS certification from the Royal College of Dental Surgeons of Ontario in 1874, and opened his own private practice shortly thereafter. He restarted the free dental hospital, branding it as "Christ Mission Hall and Dental Institute" in 1875. Adams's private practice first operated on Gerrard Street, alongside the hospital, but then moved with the hospital to the intersection of Yonge Street and Bloor Street, in the city's Yorkville neighbourhood, before finally settling in the at the corner of Yonge and Elm Streets. The Hospital for Sick Children would open in 1875, and Adams would be made its first dentist of record in 1883.

A strong believer in the importance of oral health in children, Adams began a more aggressive campaign for children's dental care in the 1890s. Adams and his son, Dr. Ezra Herbert Adams, inspected the teeth of schoolchildren at the Victoria Street school, and found that 98 percent of children there had severely neglected teeth. To further reinforce the notion that children's teeth needed urgent public attention, he published a book entitled School-Children's Teeth: Their Universally Unhealthy and Neglected Condition in 1896. Adams wrote that in order to get poor children to visit his clinic, he had to hire a man to bring those children in. Even with all the effort Adams was putting in, the hospital was still seeing little support among the public, and he had a column written in The Globe pleading parents to bring their children into the clinic to get their teeth examined.

In 1896, Adams acquired the site of an old coffeehouse on the corner of Elm Street and Teraulay Street (now Bay Street). He then moved his practice and the dental hospital into the building, keeping a room available in his practice for the free clinic. However, despite his attempts to have the property be tax-exempt for reasons of it being a charitable function, in 1899, the City of Toronto ordered Adams to pay $200 in property taxes. Being unable to, Adams closed the hospital that year, and the building and its contents were seized by the city.

Undeterred by this setback, Adams rebranded himself as a "dental missionary", and devoted his time to convincing the City of Toronto to perform routine inspections of the teeth of schoolchildren. He spent time providing dental care to children around Canada and internationally. He had convinced dentists in Hamilton and London, Ontario to reserve a half-day per month to care for the teeth of the poor. In his lobbying efforts to promote the health of schoolchildren, Adams made a statement to the premier of Ontario, George William Ross, in 1901 claiming that there were at least 1 million permanent teeth being destroyed in the mouths of schoolchildren.

Adams's efforts were not in vain, as with the support of the Ontario Dental Association, city council had finally agreed to operate a dental clinic for the city's poor on 20 April 1911, with the clinic becoming operational in 1913. By now, Adams was 74 years old, and soon to retire. The City had to spend $30,000 per year in maintenance for the clinic. Along with this, the Toronto Board of Education had agreed to inspections of the teeth of schoolchildren in 1911. Adams would retire in 1912.

== Personal life ==
Adams had 4 sons and 5 daughters with his wife, Sarah. All his sons became dentists and doctors. Sarah died on 28 October 1897, after spending her last Sabbath visiting some of the poor in Toronto's East End.

Having been raised in the Methodist Church of Canada, Adams continued to be engaged in the church for his whole life. He was the steward and trustee of St. Paul's Methodist Church when he was living in Toronto. He was also a proponent of window gardens, and promoted it in the city. Adams was a member of the Sons of Temperance, the Good Templars, the United Workmen, and the Select Knights of Canada.

Adams spent 10 years in retirement before dying on 21 May 1922, at the age of 83. He is buried in Mount Pleasant Cemetery, Toronto

== Publications ==
- Adams, John G.C. (1896). School-Children's Teeth: Their Universally Unhealthy and Neglected Condition. CIHM/ICMH Microfiche, number 35164. Toronto: John G.C. Adams. hdl:2027/aeu.ark:/13960/t7qn6w96r.
