= Paul Pörtner =

German writer (1925–1984)

Paul Pörtner (25 January 1925 – 16 November 1984) was a German playwright, novelist, translator, and editor.

== Life ==
After completing a directorial apprenticeship at the municipal theatre of his native Wuppertal, from 1951 Pörtner studied philosophy, plus German and French literature, at the University of Cologne. He later continued his studies in France. In 1958 he began earning a living as a professional author, and from 1976 on was permanently employed by Norddeutscher Rundfunk in Hamburg as a director of radio plays.

His short stories and novels very often deal with social outsiders and the disadvantaged – as a young man, he himself became physically handicapped during World War II. His work shows Pörtner to be a writer who was also deeply drawn to burlesque, in which his characters act in desperate and irrational ways. He also consistently uses experimental language and wordplay.

His interest in avant-garde theatre led him to embrace the theories of Jacob Levy Moreno, Antonin Artaud and Erwin Piscator. In addition, through his stage work as director and playwright he fell under the charm of commedia dell'arte, as well as the absurdism of Kurt Schwitters and Alfred Jarry. In 1963 Pörtner wrote the interactive play Scherenschnitt oder Der Mörder sind Sie in which the audience takes a leading role. This was first performed the same year at Theater Ulm, and at least seventy-five other German theatres followed suit.

In the United States Scherenschnitt, rewritten and titled Shear Madness, became the longest-running, non-musical play in USA stage history running for over 40 years in Boston at the Charles Playhouse from 1980 until 2020, when financial concerns related to the COVID-19 pandemic led to its closure. Productions in eighteen other countries made Scherenschnitt an international hit.

In addition to his seventeen theatre plays, Pörtner wrote more than 20 radio plays that are still influential in the German-speaking world.

== Selected works ==
=== Publications ===
- Sternbild Selbstbild. Poems. Wuppertal 1958
- Schattensteine. Poems. Wuppertal 1958
- Wurzelwerk. Poems. Wuppertal 1960
- Experiment Theater. Chronik und Dokumente. Chronicles and documents. Zürich 1960
- Tobias Immergrün. Novel. Köln 1962
- Sophie Imperator. Drama. Köln 1964
- Scherenschnitt. Kriminalstück zum Mitspielen. Stage-play. Köln 1964
- Gestern. Novel. Köln 1965
- Einkreisung eines dicken Mannes. Erzählungen, Beschreibungen, Grotesken. Tales. Köln 1968
- Spontanes Theater. Erfahrungen, Konzepte. Essays. Köln 1972

=== Plays ===
- Mensch Meier oder Das Glücksrad, 1959
- Variationen für zwei Schauspieler, 1960
- Sophie Imperator, 1961
- Drei, 1962
- Scherenschnitt oder Der Mörder sind Sie (Shear Madness), 1963
- Spielautomat, 1967
- Mascha, Mischa und Mai. Stage-play for children, 1968
- Börsenspiel, 1970
- Kontaktprogramm, 1971
- Interaktionen, 1971
- Test Test Test, 1972
- Polizeistunde, 1975
- Halt Dich da raus, 1975
- Tierspiel, 1978

=== Radio plays ===
- Was sagen Sie zu Erwin Mauss? Einkreisung eines dicken Mannes. NDR 1968
- Scherben bringen Glück. WDR 1970
- Alea. WDR/BR/SDR 1969 / 1971
- Dadaphon. Hommage à Dada. WDR 1974
- Comeback. Portrait einer Frau die singt. SR/NDR/BR 1977
- Einmischung erbeten. HR 1977
- Blitzlicht. HR 1980
- Radio-Erinnerungen. NDR 1983

=== Translations ===
- Alfred Jarry: König Ubu. Zürich 1959
- Pablo Picasso, Jean Tardieu: Der Raum und die Flöte. Variationen zu 12 Zeichnungen. Zürich 1959
- Jean Tardieu: Kammertheater. Neuwied 1960
- André Frénaud: Quelle der Quellen. Neuwied 1962
- Jean Tardieu: Professor Froeppel. Köln 1966
