= Chris, Mrs. =

- Production artwork
- Music: Matthew Stodolak, Katie Kerr
- Lyrics: Matthew Stodolak, Katie Kerr
- Premiere: December 7, 2023: Winter Garden Theatre, Toronto
- Productions: 2023 Toronto

Chris, Mrs. is a 2023 musical with music, lyrics, and book by Matthew Stodolak and Katie Kerr. The musical is set around Christmas, and is based on Hallmark Channel Christmas-themed films.

== Development ==
In 2020, Matthew Stodolak and Katie Kerr developed the project aiming to make Chris Mrs. a movie. A Kickstarter campaign was created as a fundraiser for the project, with Chilina Kennedy and Danielle Wade performing sample songs.

== Production history ==
=== Toronto (2023) ===
The musical had its world premiere at the Winter Garden Theatre in Toronto, with previews beginning on December 5, 2023, and an official opening night on December 7, later closing on December 31, 2023. The production was directed by Katie Kerr and choreographed by Sarah Vance. The cast included Liam Tobin, AJ Bridel, Danielle Wade, and Olivia Sinclair-Brisbane. The production received positive reviews from critics.

== Cast and characters ==
Role	Workshop	Toronto
Role	2022	2023
Ben Chris	George Krissa	Liam Tobin
Holly Carmichael	Danielle Wade	Danielle Wade
Vicki Vandrelle	Julia McLellan	Olivia Sinclair-Brisbane
Claire Chris	AJ Bridel	AJ Bridel
Cole Jackson	Kolton Stewart	Andrew Broderick
Charlie Chris	Kale Penny	Kale Penny
Tim Penner	Henry Firmston	Henry Firmston
Candace Brown	Sarah Lynn Strange	Sarah Lynn Strange
Nick	Mark Weatherley	Mark Weatherley
Samantha Chris	Finn Cofell	Finn Cofell; Addison Wagman
Samuel Chris	Lucas Way	Lucien Duncan-Reid; Isaac Grates-Myers

== Musical numbers ==
Act I

- "Just Another Jingle" – Ben, Vicki, and Company
- "Ready to Try" – Holly, Charlie
- "Dear Santa" – Samuel, Samantha, Claire
- "What You've Missed" – Charlie, Ben, and Company
- "All I Want For Christmas" – Claire, and Company
- "Capture The Moment" – Holly, Samuel, Samantha, and Company
- "A Christmas Song" – Holly, Ben, and Company
- "Vicki's Lament" – Vicki, and Company

Act II

- "Skating By" – Cole, Tim, Claire, and Company
- "Even If It Breaks My Heart" – Holly
- "The Great Snowy Owl" – Ben
- "Vicki's Lament (reprise)" – Vicki
- "What You've Missed (reprise)" – Ben
- "Are You There?" – Ben, Holly, and Company
- "Different This Year" – Ben, Holly, and Company

=== Cast recording ===
A studio cast recording was released digitally on December 6, 2024. The album featured Adam Jacobs, Danielle Wade, Samantha Pauly, AJ Bridel, and Danny Burstein.

No.	Title	Performer(s)	Length
1.	"Overture"	Ensemble	0:52
2.	"Just Another Jingle"	Adam Jacobs, Samantha Pauly, Sarah Strange, Finn Cofell, Isaac Grates-Myers	6:15
3.	"Ready To Try"	Danielle Wade, Kale Penny	3:47
4.	"Dear Santa"	Cofell, Grates-Myers, AJ Bridel	3:55
5.	"What You Missed"	Penny, Jacobs, Kolton Stewart, Henry Firmston, Bridel, Cofell, Grates-Myers	3:44
6.	"All I Want For Christmas"	Bridel	3:36
7.	"Capture The Moment"	Wade, Cofell, Grates-Myers, Danny Burstein, Strange	3:19
8.	"A Christmas Song"	Wade, Jacobs, Strange	5:07
9.	"Vicki's Lament"	Pauly	2:56
10.	"Skating By"	Stewart, Firmston, Bridel	4:14
11.	"Even If It Breaks My Heart"	Wade	3:37
12.	"The Great Snowy Owl"	Jacobs, Cofell, Grates-Myers	4:18
13.	"Santa Dear"	Burstein, Strange	1:44
14.	"Vicki's Reprise"	Pauly	1:13
15.	"What You Missed (reprise)"	Jacobs	1:03
16.	"Are You There?"	Jacobs, Wade, Bridel, Cofell, Grates-Myers, Firmston, Matthew Stodolak	3:08
17.	"Different This Year"	Jacobs, Wade, Penny, Bridel, Firmston, Cofell, Grates-Myers, Strange	3:04
Total length:			55:59
