= Jennifer Gillis =

Canadian singer, dancer and actress

Jennifer Kristine Gillis
- Born: 26 April 1996 (age 30); Coquitlam, British Columbia, Canada
- Occupations: Actor; singer; dancer
- Years active: 2013–present

Jennifer Kristine Gillis (born 26 April 1996) is a Canadian singer, dancer and actress with an extensive resume in musical theatre, television, singing, radio, recording, and animated voice-over work. Gillis is most noted for performing in Sir Andrew Lloyd Webber's CBC TV reality show Over the Rainbow-a competition to be cast as the leading role of Dorothy Gale in Lloyd Webber's forthcoming production of The Wizard of Oz in Toronto, Ontario. Being the youngest aspiring singer in the competition, she singularly represented her province of British Columbia and as a result was named the Top 6th musical theatre performer in all of Canada. Since Over the Rainbow, Gillis sang the Canadian national anthem "O Canada" for the Prime Minister of Canada, Stephen Harper on Parliament Hill in Ottawa, Ontario on Canada Day in 2013. She is a professional Canadian Musical Theatre Actress performing in roles such as Maria in West Side Story, Ariel in The Little Mermaid, Beth in Little Women, Millie Dilmount in Thoroughly Modern Millie, Gertrude McFuzz in Seussical, Ariel Moore in Footloose and more .

== Background ==
Gillis was born and raised in Coquitlam, British Columbia, the older sister of Rachelle Gillis, also an actress, who has appeared in the Disney XD film Pants on Fire. She was involved in the performing arts industry from a very young age and at the age of seven, Gillis was scouted by Carrier Talent Management, a talent agency in Central Vancouver and began her career as a TV actress. On screen, Gillis appeared in many television commercials for toy companies such as Mattel (Barbie, Polly Pocket, and Fur Real Friends). Gillis then performed animated voice-over work. Gillis appeared in the TV series Bratz and also did many radio commercials for companies such as John Casablancas, Newland Homes, The Canadian Cancer Society, Shaw, and BLT DVD Productions. Gillis attended Gleneagle Secondary School, concentrating in the performing arts. Gillis appeared in many of her school's musical theatre productions, playing such roles as Millie Dilmount in the musical Thoroughly Modern Millie, Gertrude Mcfuzz in Seussical the Musical, Cindy Lou Who in How the Grinch Stole Christmas and Ariel Moore in the musical Footloose. She graduated in 2014.

Since the age of six, Gillis trained with Lindbjerg Academy of Performing Arts in her hometown of Coquitlam, British Columbia for over 10 consecutive years, training and studying musical theatre-singing, dancing and acting. With the performing arts academy she toured all around Greater British Columbia performing in many professional productions.

== Career ==
=== Musical Theatre ===
Gillis has played leading roles all across Canada in Professional Canadian Musicals. Roles include Ariel in Disney's "The Little Mermaid," Maria in "West Side Story," Beth in "Little Women," Millie Dilmount in "Thoroughly Modern Millie," Ariel Moore in "Footloose," Miss. Dorothy Brown in "Thoroughly Modern Millie," Gertrude McFuzz in "Seussical," Diana in "Anne of Green Gables," Kim MacAfee in "Bye Bye Birdie," Little Red in "Into the Woods" to name select credits. Gillis recently began teaching musical theatre in her home province of British Columbia.

=== Over the Rainbow ===
While still in school, Gillis was chosen from over 9,000 girls to be in the final ten and perform live, on the CBC reality TV show Over the Rainbow for the chance to play Dorothy Gale in Sir Andrew Lloyd Webber's forthcoming musical adaptation of The Wizard of Oz. She was the youngest competitor in the competition and singularly represented her hometown of Coquitlam and province of British Columbia.

==== Gillis' performances ====
	Song
Top 100 Audition (06/01/12)	"Over the Rainbow" (from The Wizard of Oz)
Top 20 Callback (06/21/12)	"The Trolley Song" (from Meet Me in St. Louis)
Top 10 Callback (08/30/12)	"On My Own" (from Les Miserables)
Week 1 Solo (09/16/12)	"Whistle Down the Wind" (from Whistle Down the Wind)
Week 1 Group (09/17/12)	"One" (from A Chorus Line)
Week 2 Solo (09/23/12)	"I'll Stand By You" (The Pretenders)
Week 2 Group (09/24/12)	"Defying Gravity" (from Wicked)
Week 3 Solo (10/07/12)	"Supercalifragilisticexpialidocious" (from Mary Poppins)
Week 3 Group (10/08/12)	"Anything You Can Do" (from Annie Get Your Gun)
Week 4 Solo (10/14/12)	"Crazy Little Thing Called Love" (Queen)
Week 4 Group (10/15/12)	"I Enjoy Being a Girl" (from Flower Drum Song)
Week 4 Sing Off (10/15/12)	"Tell Me On a Sunday" (from Tell Me On a Sunday)

=== Canada Day 2013 ===
On Canada's 146th birthday, Gillis was asked by the Prime Minister of Canada Stephen Harper and the Canadian Minister of Heritage James Moore to sing the Canadian national anthem to honour the country of Canada. Both the Prime Minister and Minister of Heritage saw Gillis on Over the Rainbow and felt that she would represent Canada perfectly. Gillis sang the anthem bilingually in front of a live audience with over 80,000 people at Parliament Hill in Ottawa. Gillis sang alongside Canadian artists such as Carly Rae Jepsen, Chris Hadfield, Marie-Mai, Metric, La Radio La Radio, Terri Clarke and many more to celebrate the big day. After the ceremony Gillis was congratulated by Stephen Harper (and family), the Governor General of Canada and the Senator of Canada.

== Discography ==
Gillis recorded her version of the Canadian National Anthem "O Canada" that she sang for the Prime Minister and Canada's 146th birthday celebration.
