= Danielle Wade =

Canadian actress and singer (born 1992)

- Born: 30 June 1992 (age 34)
- Occupations: Actress, singer
- Years active: 2012–present
- Spouse: Will Branner (m. 2023)
- Parents: Doug Wade (father); Jodi Wade (mother)
- Relatives: Jordyn Wade (sister), Alexa Wade (sister)

Danielle Wade (born 30 June 1992) is a Canadian actress and singer. She first rose to prominence for winning the 2012 Canadian reality television series Over the Rainbow. She originated the role of Dorothy Gale in the Andrew Lloyd Webber production of The Wizard of Oz, which began performances at the Ed Mirvish Theatre in December 2012. She continued on in the role for the subsequent North American tour of The Wizard of Oz.

== Early life ==
Wade was raised in LaSalle, Ontario. She is the oldest of three daughters born to Jodi and Doug Wade. Growing up, Wade was a figure skater. She graduated from Sandwich Secondary School, and attended the University of Windsor where she pursued a BFA in musical theatre. As a student, she starred as Elle Woods in a local production of Legally Blonde. However, Wade dropped out following her second year after she won Over the Rainbow.

== Career ==
In 2012, Wade auditioned for the Canadian reality television series Over the Rainbow, which was based on the 2010 BBC series of the same name. After being named as one of the top ten finalists, Wade never placed in the bottom 2 throughout the competition. Andrew Lloyd Webber referred to Wade as “an extraordinary talent". On November 4, 2012, Wade was named the winner of Over the Rainbow.

As a result of winning Over the Rainbow, Wade starred as Dorothy Gale in the North American premiere of Lloyd Webber's stage adaptation of The Wizard of Oz. The musical opened at the Ed Mirvish Theatre in Toronto on December 20, 2012, and played until August 18, 2013. Wade then reprised her role as Dorothy for the subsequent North American tour, which opened on September 10, 2013, and concluded on June 29, 2014. Overall, Wade has performed as Dorothy approximately 500 times.

In 2014, Wade starred as Cinderella in Cinderella, a Ross Petty family holiday pantomime production.

Between 2015 and 2017, Wade appeared in five Drayton Entertainment musical productions. In 2015, Wade played Anne Shirley in their production of Anne of Green Gables. In 2016, she starred as Sophie Sheridan in Mamma Mia, and then as Ariel Moore in Footloose. In 2017, she played the Narrator in Drayton Entertainment's production of Joseph and the Amazing Technicolor Dreamcoat. Later in 2017, she starred as Belle in Beauty and the Beast.

In 2018, Wade starred as Marian Paroo in the Stratford Festival production of The Music Man.

Wade made her Broadway debut in Mean Girls, a musical based on the Tina Fey movie. The musical opened at the August Wilson Theatre in April 2018, with Wade understudying the lead roles of Cady Heron and Janis Sarkisian. In August 2019, it was announced that Wade would star as Cady Heron in the first North American tour of Mean Girls. She continued in the role when performances resumed following the COVID-19 pandemic.

In May 2023, it was announced that Wade would star alongside Corbin Bleu in the world premiere production of Summer Stock, based on the 1950 film of the same name. The musical, produced by Goodspeed Musicals, was performed between July 7 and August 27, 2023.

== Personal life ==
Wade was raised in LaSalle, Ontario, by her parents, Doug and Jodi Wade. Wade is the oldest sibling to her two sisters, Jordyn and Alexa. Family is very important to Wade, and their support for her and her career is evident.

On May 1, 2023, Wade married musical theatre actor Will Branner in Goldsboro, North Carolina.

== Theater credits ==
Year	Production	Role	Location	Category
2012–2013	The Wizard of Oz	Dorothy Gale	Ed Mirvish Theatre	North American premiere: Toronto
2013–2014	The Wizard of Oz	Dorothy Gale	First National Tour	
2014	Cinderella	Cinderella	Elgin Theatre	Regional / Ross Petty Productions
2015	Anne of Green Gables	Anne Shirley	Dunfield Theatre Cambridge	Regional / Drayton Entertainment
2016	Mamma Mia	Sophie Sheridan	Dunfield Theatre Cambridge	Regional / Drayton Entertainment
2016	Footloose	Ariel Moore	Dunfield Theatre Cambridge	Regional / Drayton Entertainment
2017	Joseph and the Amazing Technicolor Dreamcoat	Narrator	Huron Country Playhouse	Regional / Drayton Entertainment
2017	Beauty and the Beast	Belle	Dunfield Theatre Cambridge	Regional / Drayton Entertainment
2017	From Here to Eternity	u/s Lorene	Ogunquit Playhouse	Regional
2018	The Music Man	Marian Paroo	Festival Theatre	Regional / Stratford Festival
2018–2019	Mean Girls	u/s Cady Heron, u/s Janis Sarkisian	August Wilson Theatre	Broadway
2019–2022	Mean Girls	Cady Heron	First National Tour	
2023	Summer Stock	Jane Falbury	Goodspeed Musicals	World premiere
2023	Chris, Mrs.	Holly Carmichael	Winter Garden Theatre	Toronto: World premiere
2024	South Pacific	Ensign Nellie Forbush	Goodspeed Musicals	Regional
2024	Shucked	Maizy	First National Tour	
2026	City of Angels	Oolie / Donna	Ogunquit Playhouse	Regional

== Filmography ==
=== Television ===
Year	Title	Role	Notes
2012	Over the Rainbow	Herself	Winner
2021	The Old Guards		TV short

=== Film ===
Year	Title	Role	Notes
2020	Night Terror	Night Terror	Short film
2022	Squatting	Sophie	Short film
