= Last Chance Romance =

2008 play written by Sam Bobrick

Last Chance Romance is a 2008 comedy in two acts written by American playwright Sam Bobrick and published by Samuel French, Inc.

== Synopsis ==
As stated on the back cover of the play, "Myra Witzer, a strong willed woman in her late thirties, is determined to get married at any cost and Leonard Shank, an unassuming man in his early forties is the guy she goes after and gets, much against his will. After several months of married life, Myra realizes that the chase excited her more than the capture and wants out. On the other hand, Leonard, who at the beginning wanted no part of the marriage to Myra, now wants to stay married to her more than anything."
