= Alan Lund =

Canadian dancer and choreographer (1925–1992)

Alan Lund, OC (May 23, 1925 – July 1, 1992) was a Canadian dancer and choreographer, who worked in television, movies and theatre.

Lund trained as a dancer in his native Toronto, Ontario and first established a performance reputation as a dance team with his wife Blanche, appearing during World War II in the revue Meet the Navy. The couple became two of the first contract players for CBC Television. Turning to choreography in the 1950s, Lund contributed to various productions, including Spring Thaw, the Canadian National Exhibition grandstand show, and the Stratford Festival. From 1966 to 1986 he was artistic director of the Charlottetown Festival, where he directed the successful musical, Anne of Green Gables, and several other productions. His own The Legend of the Dumbbells premiered at the festival in 1977. Later he directed and choreographed productions such as Kiss Me, Kate (Toronto, 1986). From 1987 until his death he was a resident director of the Rainbow Stage. Lund also worked with musical theatre students at the Banff Centre for many years. He received an honorary degree from the University of Prince Edward Island and became an Officer of the Order of Canada.

Lund collaborated extensively with friend Alex Mustakas, artistic director of Drayton Entertainment. Since Lund's death, this organization has created a scholarship fund in his name for recipients pursuing careers in the arts. The scholarship is awarded annually at the Alan Lund Tribute Show, a variety show and fundraiser at the Drayton Festival Theatre in Drayton, Ontario.
