= Drayton, Ontario =

Drayton
- Unincorporated community
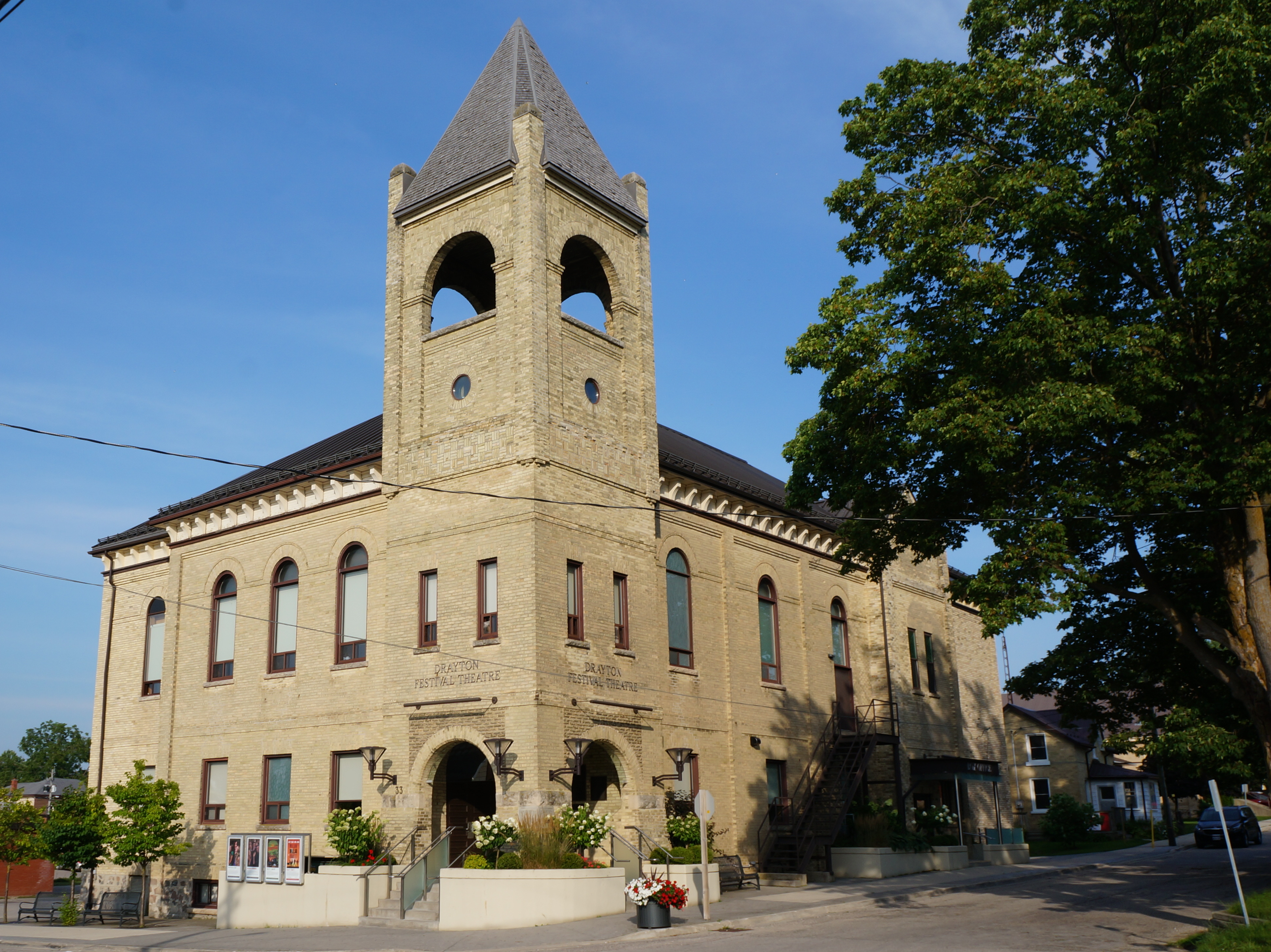
- The Drayton Festival Theatre.
- Interactive map of Drayton
- Coordinates: 43°45′16″N 80°40′17″W
- Country: Canada
- Province: Ontario
- County: Wellington County
- Township: Mapleton

Area
  - Total: 3.78 km^{2} (1.46 sq mi)

Population (2021)
  - Total: 2,279
  - Density: 813.9/km^{2} (2,108/sq mi)
- Time zone: UTC-5 (EST)
  - Summer (DST): UTC-4 (EDT)
- Forward sortation area: N0G 1P0
- Area codes: 519 and 226
- NTS Map: 040P15
- GNBC Code: FAZRM

Drayton is a community in Wellington County, Ontario, Canada. It is a part of the township of Mapleton. The village is on the corner of Wellington Road 8 and Wellington Road 11, geographically northwest of Fergus and southwest of Arthur.

== History ==
In 1851, the community, then a part of the township of Peel, was named after Drayton Manor in Staffordshire, England. Drayton Manor was the home of Robert Peel, former Prime Minister of the United Kingdom.

== Education ==
Drayton is in the Upper Grand District School Board. Both Centre Peel Public School and Drayton Heights Public School (K-8) service students from the Drayton area; while high school students attend Norwell District Secondary School in nearby Palmerston, Ontario. Drayton is also the home of Community Christian School, formerly known as Calvin Christian School.

== Entertainment ==
Drayton is home to the Drayton Festival Theatre, which is a renovated 1902 Opera House that seats 375 people, and has a rich history of entertaining audiences with the finest talent in professional theatre, including legendary performers as Beatrice Lillie. Alex Mustakas is the CEO and artistic director of Drayton Entertainment. Drayton hosts one branch of the Wellington County library system.

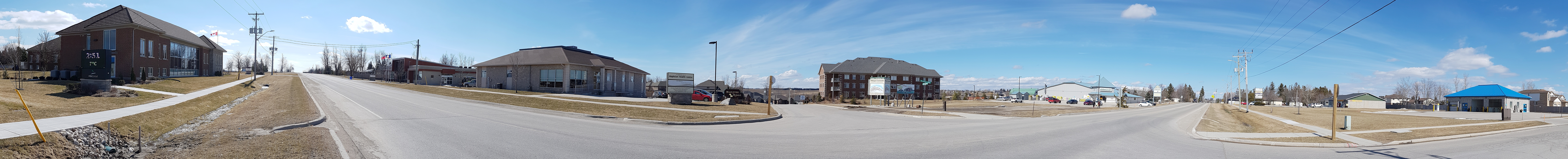
County Road 11 in Drayton

== Healthcare ==
Located downtown Drayton, the Mapleton Health Centre's eight primary care physicians and four nurse practitioners service 15,000 patients. Drayton also has multiple senior's living accommodations and long-term care homes.

== Media ==
Drayton is serviced specifically by a local newspaper The Community News, in addition to the Wellington Advertiser, a publication serving the entirety of Wellington County.

== Natural disasters ==
On June 23, 2017, Drayton and surrounding Wellington County towns declared a state of emergency due to flooding. Over 100 mm of rain fell within 24 hours. Many roads were closed and hundreds of basements were flooded.

== Recreation ==
Drayton contains the Agricultural Fairgrounds, Kinsmen Park, Riverside Park, Centennial Park, Rotary Park, Memorial Park, and ABC Park. There are also various sports facilities, such as the PMD Arena, a soccer field, and baseball diamonds located throughout Drayton. Children can play in the official Drayton soccer, hockey, or baseball leagues, as well as on many intramural teams in school. Adult recreational sports also take place (pickleball, skating, hockey).

== Notable people ==
- John Gennings Curtis Adams (1839 – 1922), dentist who served as the first dentist of record at the Hospital for Sick Children
- John G. FitzGerald (1882 – 1940), physician and public health specialist who was instrumental in the control of diphtheria
- Samuel Lewis Honey (1894 – 1918), soldier and posthumous recipient of the Victoria Cross
- Bruce Howard (1922 – 2002), member of the House of Commons of Canada from 1968 – 1972
- Alan Lund (1925 – 1992), dancer and choreographer who was the artistic director of the Charlottetown Festival from 1966 – 1986
- Alex Mustakas (???? - ), actor and theatre director who is the founding Artistic Director of Drayton Entertainment
- Nick Spaling (1988 – ), professional ice hockey player in the NHL from 2009 – 2016
