= Meet the Navy =

Meet the Navy was a musical revue produced by the Royal Canadian Navy during World War II. Directed by Hollywood producer Louis Silver and Broadway choreographer Larry Ceballos, the production premiered in a private performance for servicemen on 2 September 1943 at Toronto's Victoria Theatre. The first performance open to the public was given on the following 4 September. The production toured Canada in 1943-1944, entertaining approximately a half-million Canadians.

It then toured to 11 cities in England, and to cities in Wales and Ireland in 1944-1945; beginning in Glasgow on 23 October 1944 and ending at the Hippodrome, London on 7 April 1945. Adele Astaire "worshipped it" and thought the dancing was "simply divine." The show subsequently toured to the Théâtre Marigny in Paris, the Vauxhall, Brussels, and the Carré Theatre in Amsterdam's Carré. The production's final performance was on 12 September 1945 at the Oldenburgisches Staatstheater in Germany. The National Film Board of Canada produced a documentary Meet the Navy on Tour, and British National Films presented another feature film called Meet the Navy which was filmed in November 1945 in Britain and released in 1946. Although plans for a Broadway run were made, they never materialized.

A recreation of the original production was staged in Nova Scotia during the summers of 1980, 1981 and 1982, produced by Targe Productions and presented by the Province of Nova Scotia through the department of Culture, Recreation and Fitness. It was directed and choreographed by the original production's performers, Blanche and Alan Lund. It also featured another original cast member, Robert John Pratt reprising his song, 'You'll get used to it.' In 1982, the production presented two musical numbers in a 90-minute musical celebration for Canada's new constitution, with Queen Elizabeth II attending; she saw the original production when she was 18. The Gala was presented at the National Arts Centre and broadcast by the Canadian Broadcasting Corporation (CBC).
