= One Week Job =

2007 project by Sean Aiken

The One Week Job project was launched in February 2007 when 25-year-old college graduate Sean Aiken worked 52 jobs in 52 weeks to find his passion. The idea to try out a new job each week came to Aiken when he realized he was unsure of what career to pursue after completing a business degree.

In lieu of wages, Aiken asked his “employers” to donate to Make Poverty History, and raised $20,401.60 for the campaign. To support his travels and basic living expenses during the project, Aiken was sponsored by NiceJob.ca, a Canadian job search engine.

Over the course of the year, Aiken tried out a variety of job roles across Canada and the United States, including preschool teacher, firefighter, fashion buyer, cowboy, NHL mascot, and stock trader.

With his project ending in March 2008, Aiken wrote a book about his adventure, titled The One-Week Job Project, published in 2010 by Penguin Canada and Random House Publishing Group in the United States.

== About Sean Aiken ==
In 2005, Sean Aiken graduated from Capilano University in North Vancouver, British Columbia, Canada, with a degree in business administration. He had a 4.0 GPA and was voted class valedictorian. After graduating, he travelled around the world for a year-and-a-half before returning to live with his parents in British Columbia. At this point, he was still unsure of what to do with his life.

One day, during a family dinner, Aiken's father told him, “Sean, it doesn't matter what you do, just make sure it's something you're passionate about.” Shortly after, Aiken started his 52-week journey.

Sean Aiken currently lives in Vancouver, British Columbia. He continues to encourage people to find their passion through his speaking engagements at schools and colleges around North America.

== Documentary ==
Sean Aiken's best friend, filmmaker Ian MacKenzie, travelled with Aiken for much of his original 52-week journey and documented the details of the experience on film. In the summer of 2010, the documentary The One-Week Job Project premiered at HATCHfest in the United States.

== Summer Program ==
In the summer of 2010, three program participants were selected for the inaugural One Week Job Program. Spots for the program were awarded based on public votes during an online competition. The first three participants were from Toronto, Texas and Tennessee. Each participant was awarded a scholarship of $3,000 (CDN) and given eight weeks to try eight different jobs.

== Bibliography ==
- Aiken, Sean (2010) The One-Week Job Project. Penguin Books ISBN 9780143170518
