= Shear Madness =

Play written by Paul Pörtner

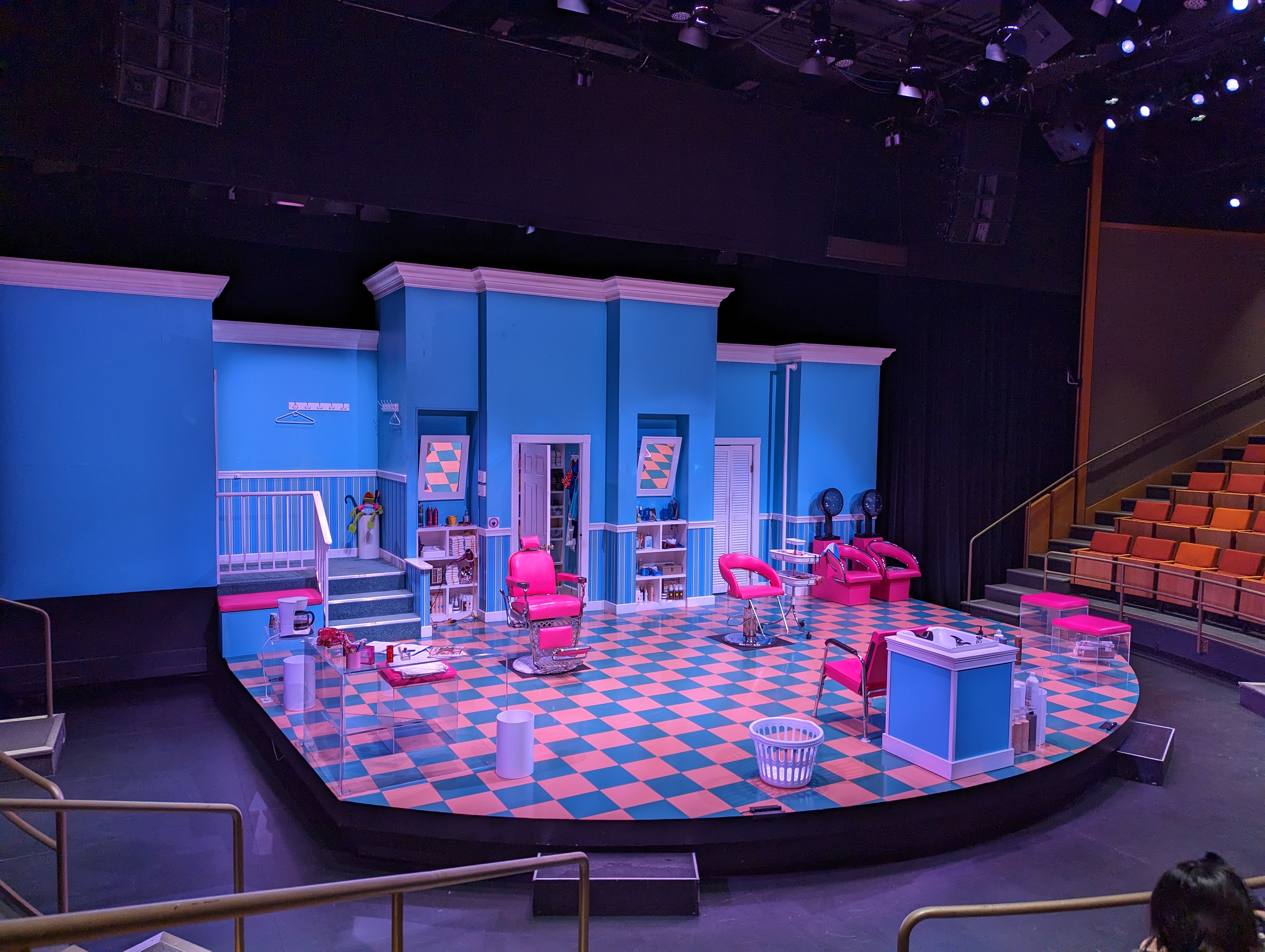
- Shear Madness set at the Kennedy Center
- Original language: German
- Written by: Paul Pörtner

Premiere
- Date: 1963
- Place: Theater Ulm; Ulm, Germany
- Official website

Shear Madness is an interactive whodunit play, and one of the longest-running nonmusical plays in the world. The Boston production ran from 1980 to 2020 at the Charles Playhouse. A production at the Kennedy Center ran from 1987 to 2026.

Shear Madness is based on the German-language play Scherenschnitt, written by Paul Pörtner and first performed at the Theater Ulm in 1963.

== Plot ==
The play is set in a unisex hair salon in the city where it is played. The landlady, Isabel Czerny, who lives above the shop is murdered and the audience gets involved in the action by questioning the actors and attempting to solve the crime. The characters include a flamboyant hairdresser and their flirty yet ditzy assistant, along with a prim and proper uptight older lady, and an older man who is a "used antique dealer". Much of the dialogue is improvised by the actors, and the humor tends to revolve around topical references to current events.

The ending of the play is different every night as audience members hear clues, question the characters, and then vote on who they think is guilty. Whoever the audience votes to be the murderer, that person improvises dialogue along with the rest of the cast to reveal themselves.

== Current productions ==
=== United States ===
Shear Madness is being performed at a variety of local productions in 2026.

=== Poland ===
A production began in Warsaw, Poland at the Kwadrat Theatre in 1999. By January 2025, it had been performed over 1,200 times in Warsaw.

In 2006, productions of Shear Madness began at the Bagatela Theatre in Kraków, Poland. In 2024, the Kraków production celebrated its 1,000 performance of the play at the theater.

=== France ===
A French adaptation by director Sébastien Azzopardi, written by Azzopardi and Sacha Danino, opened in Paris at the Théâtre des Mathurins in 2011 and has had over 3,500 performances.

== Past productions ==
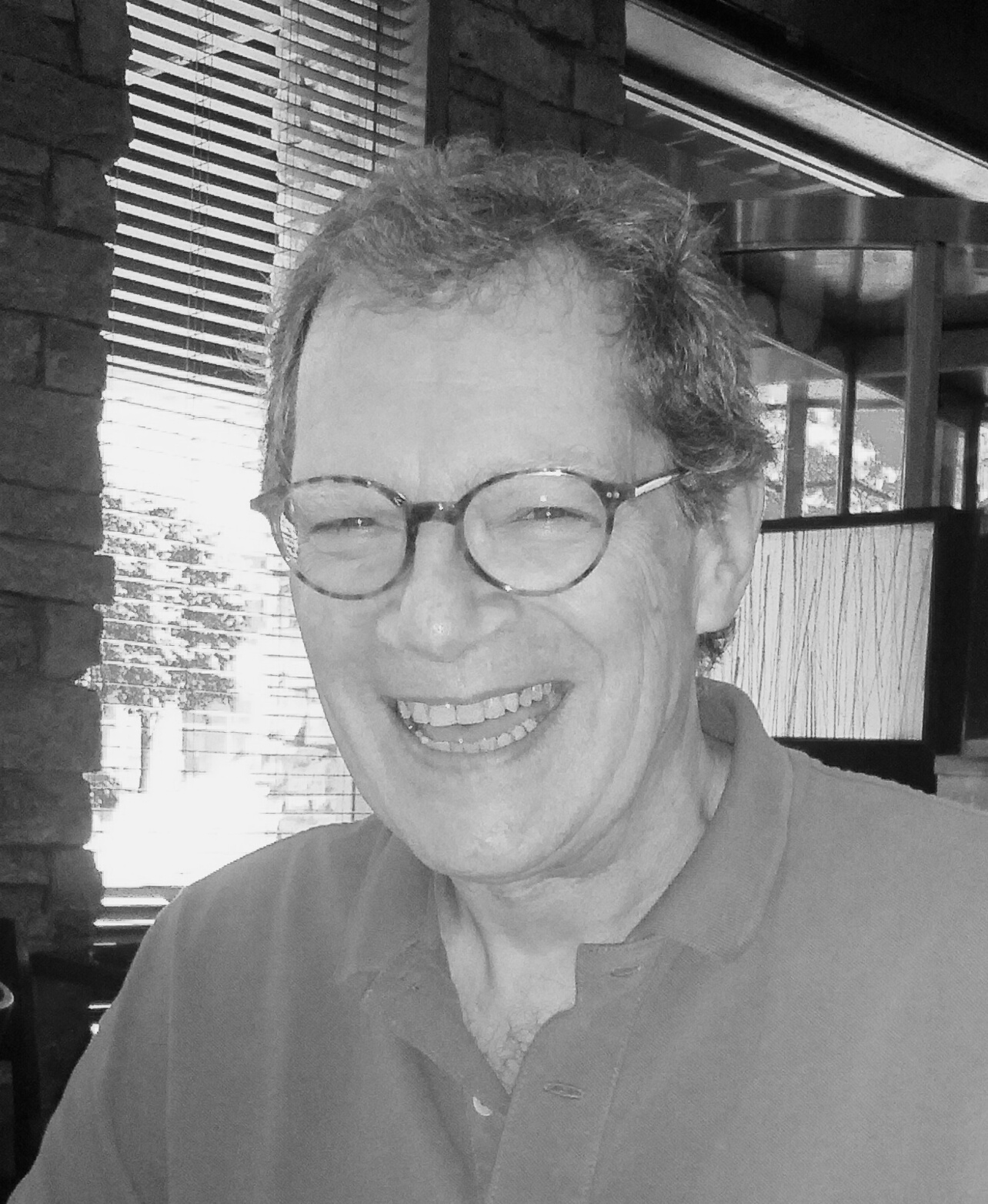
Patrick Shea performed with the Boston cast of Shear Madness from 1983 until its closure in 2020.

=== North America ===
Shear Madness first opened in Lake George, New York in 1978.

A production opened in November 2015 at the New World Stages Off-Broadway theater in New York City running there until July 2016. It then reopened later that month at the Davenport Theater, running until April 2017. Productions also ran in Philadelphia and Chicago.

A Spanish adaptation by director Rina Rajlevsky, written by Alberto Lomnitz and Ricardo Esquerra, opened in 2017 in Mexico City at the Fernando Soler Theatre.

==== Boston ====
In January 1980, it opened Boston at the Charles Playhouse Stage II and initially was planned for an 8-week run before heading to New York. However, the show initially failed to re-coup so it continued on in Boston until it made back its initial investment, which it did in August 1980. It continued on for the next 40 years, closing for good on March 15, 2020 citing potential losses from the then emerging COVID-19 pandemic.

The Boston production was described as the longest running non-musical play in the United States.

==== Washington, DC ====
In August 1987, a production of Shear Madness opened at the John F. Kennedy Center for the Performing Arts's Theater Lab in Washington D.C.. It was performed a total of 14,737 times, and the final show was on June 7, 2026. The production ended after its run of 39 years due to President Trump's attempted closure of the Kennedy Center.

=== Europe ===
A Catalan adaptation by director Pere Planella, written by Guillem-Jordi Graells, opened in 1987 in Barcelona.

A Spanish translation by Nacho Artime premiered in April 1989 in Madrid at the Teatro Figaro. It was restaged there in the 1990s, 2000s, and twice in the 2010s.

A Turkish adaptation by director Nedim Saban opened in Istanbul in 1998 and ran for over 500 performances. In 2003, Saban adapted the play for the second time, introducing SMS messages and online chat as means of audience interaction.

== See also ==
- Long-running plays

== External sources ==
- Official website
