= Over the River and Through the Woods =

1998 play written by Joe DiPietro

- Written by: Joe DiPietro
- Characters: Frank; Nick; Aida; Caitlin; Nunzio; Emma
- Original language: English
- Setting: The Gianelli home in Hoboken, New Jersey

Premiere
- Date premiered: 1994
- Place premiered: Belmont Italian American Playhouse; Bronx, New York

Over the River and Through the Woods is a play written by Joe DiPietro, published in 1998. It played Off-Broadway at the John Houseman Theatre for 800 performances over two years.

== Plot ==
=== Act One ===
Nick is a young, carefree bachelor in New Jersey who spends nearly every Sunday afternoon visiting and dining with either of his two sets of grandparents, who are ethnic Italians. One Thursday he makes an unscheduled visit to announce that his corporate employer will be promoting and relocating him to Seattle, Washington, in a few months. His grandparents are shocked, and dedicate themselves to making Nick stay. Without telling him, they invite a young Irish woman named Caitlin to join them at the next dinner, hoping the two will bond and Nick will remain in the area. Instead, they embarrass Nick in front of her, causing Nick to repeatedly snap at them. This disgusts Caitlin, and following her departure Nick yells at his grandparents, berating them at their attempts to control his life. The scene climaxes with Nick having a panic attack and fainting as a result of the stress.

=== Act Two ===
Two days later, Nick is resting at his grandparents house recovering from his panic attack. His grandparents try a variety of methods to cheer him up, first by playing Trivial Pursuit, then by Nunzio telling a thoroughly exaggerated story of how he and Emma met. Later, when the two of them are alone, Frank recalls to Nick a story of his own father back in Italy, and Nick meditates on the complexity of his grandparents' lives. Later, Caitlin comes to visit Nick and apologizes for snapping at him. She tells him that if he stays in New Jersey, she'd be willing to go on another date with him.

The next Sunday, Nick returns to his grandparents house for dinner. He announces that he's accepted the promotion, much to the dismay and grief of everyone. Nunzio goes to tell Nick about his terminal cancer, only to refrain at the last second, realizing that Nick needs to find himself without the help of his family.

Two months after Nick moves to Seattle, Nunzio dies of metastatic prostate cancer. Nick states in an aside that had he known, he would have stayed in New Jersey without question. Two years later, Frank and Emma have also died, and Nick is engaged. While visiting Aida, Nick offers to move her to Portland (where his company is offering him yet another promotion) so they'll be able to see each other more often, but Aida refuses, stating she'd never be able to live in a house other than the one Frank built for her. In the final scene, Nick takes a few mementos of his grandparents (Nunzio's camera, Emma's prayer cards, and Frank's car keys), finally appreciating how much they loved and looked out for him.
