= Drayton Entertainment =

Canadian theatre company in Ontario

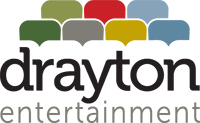
- Genre: Arts Festival
- Dates: March to December
- Locations: Drayton, Ontario, Canada
- Founded: 1991
- Website: draytonentertainment.com

Drayton Entertainment is a not-for-profit professional theatre company based in Southwestern Ontario operating seven venues across the province: the original Drayton Festival Theatre in Drayton, Huron Country Playhouse (Mainstage and South Huron Stage in Grand Bend), King's Wharf Theatre in Penetanguishene, Hildebrand Schoolhouse Theatre in St. Jacobs, St. Jacobs Country Playhouse in Waterloo, and Hamilton Family Theatre Cambridge in the historic Galt community of Cambridge.

Alex Mustakas is the founding Artistic Director; his current title is Founder and CEO. David Connolly is the current Artistic Director.

The organization has been producing live theatre productions for over 35 years, including musicals, comedies, and dramas.

== Theatres ==
=== Drayton Festival Theatre (Drayton, Ontario) ===
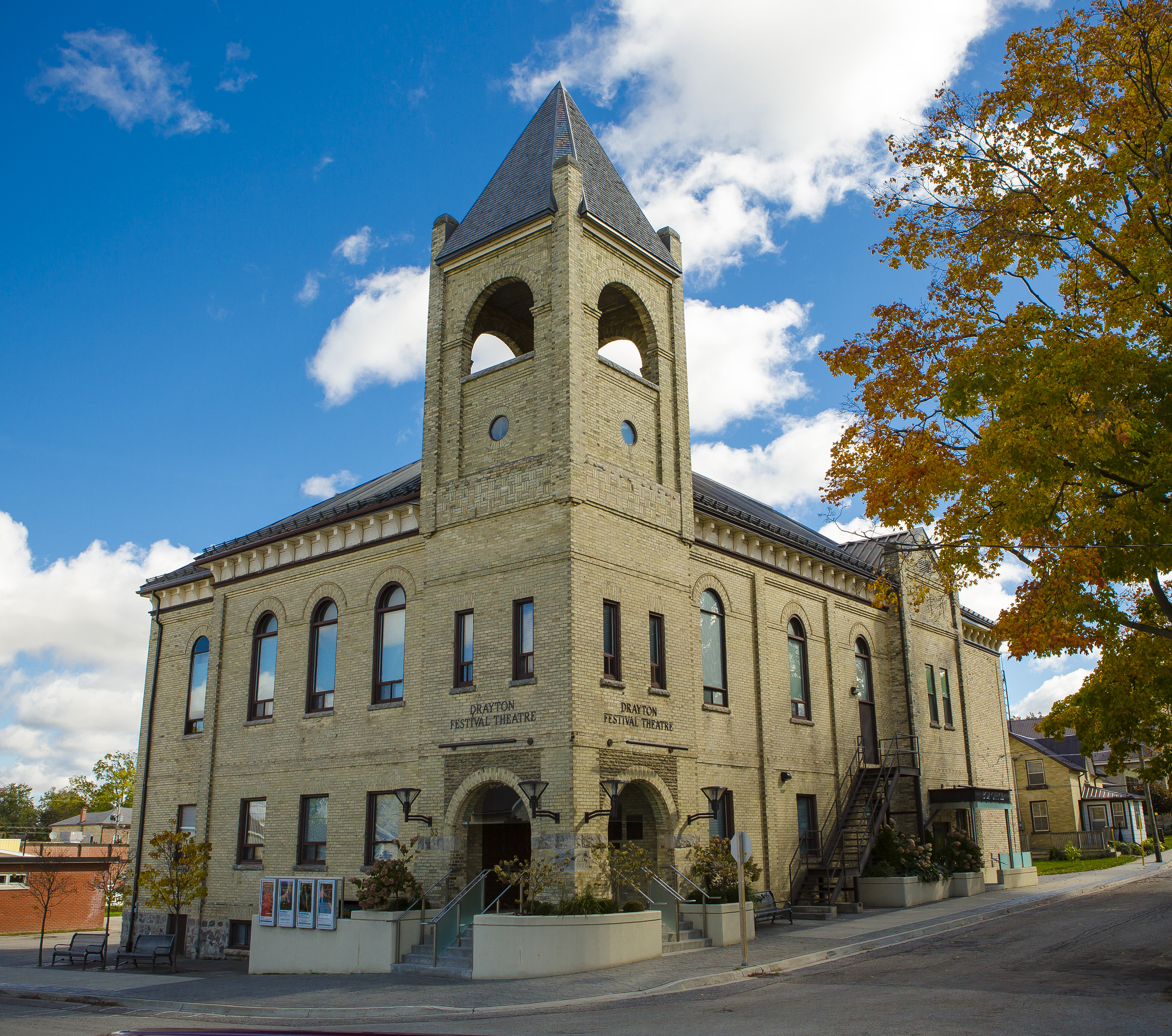
Drayton Festival Theatre

Drayton is located 30 minutes north of Kitchener-Waterloo. The former Town Hall, built in 1902, has hosted performers such as Beatrice Lillie. The building also housed the town offices and eventually became a complete municipal complex, which included town offices, council chambers, library, fire hall, automobile repair shop and jail.

By the 1980s, the theatre was used infrequently, but was revived in 1983 by a group of area residents interested in amateur productions. The Drayton Community Players staged two shows each year until the theatre was closed for safety reasons in 1989. In 1989, local residents raised $110,000 to retrofit the facility after its closure.

In 1990, the theatre reopened for public use and The Drayton Festival Theatre Inc. was formed to produce professional theatre and facilitate cultural and educational activities. Alex Mustakas was hired as the Artistic Director.

Mustakas enlisted the help of Canadian director/choreographer Alan Lund to produce the first show of the 1991 season. Vaudeville! brought the Drayton Festival Theatre to life on Canada Day, July 1, 1991. The first season consisted of three productions over nine weeks and attracted 14,592 visitors to the village. The first season relied on volunteers for front of house management, ushering, laundry, and technical support.

The Drayton Festival Theatre sold all available tickets for its 1993 and 1994 seasons. All 36,000 available seats for the 1994 season were sold one month prior to the beginning of rehearsals.

As the popularity of The Drayton Festival Theatre grew, so did each season and by 1996, the season expanded to 21 weeks with an overall attendance record of 62,660.

=== Hildebrand Schoolhouse Theatre St. Jacobs (St. Jacobs) ===
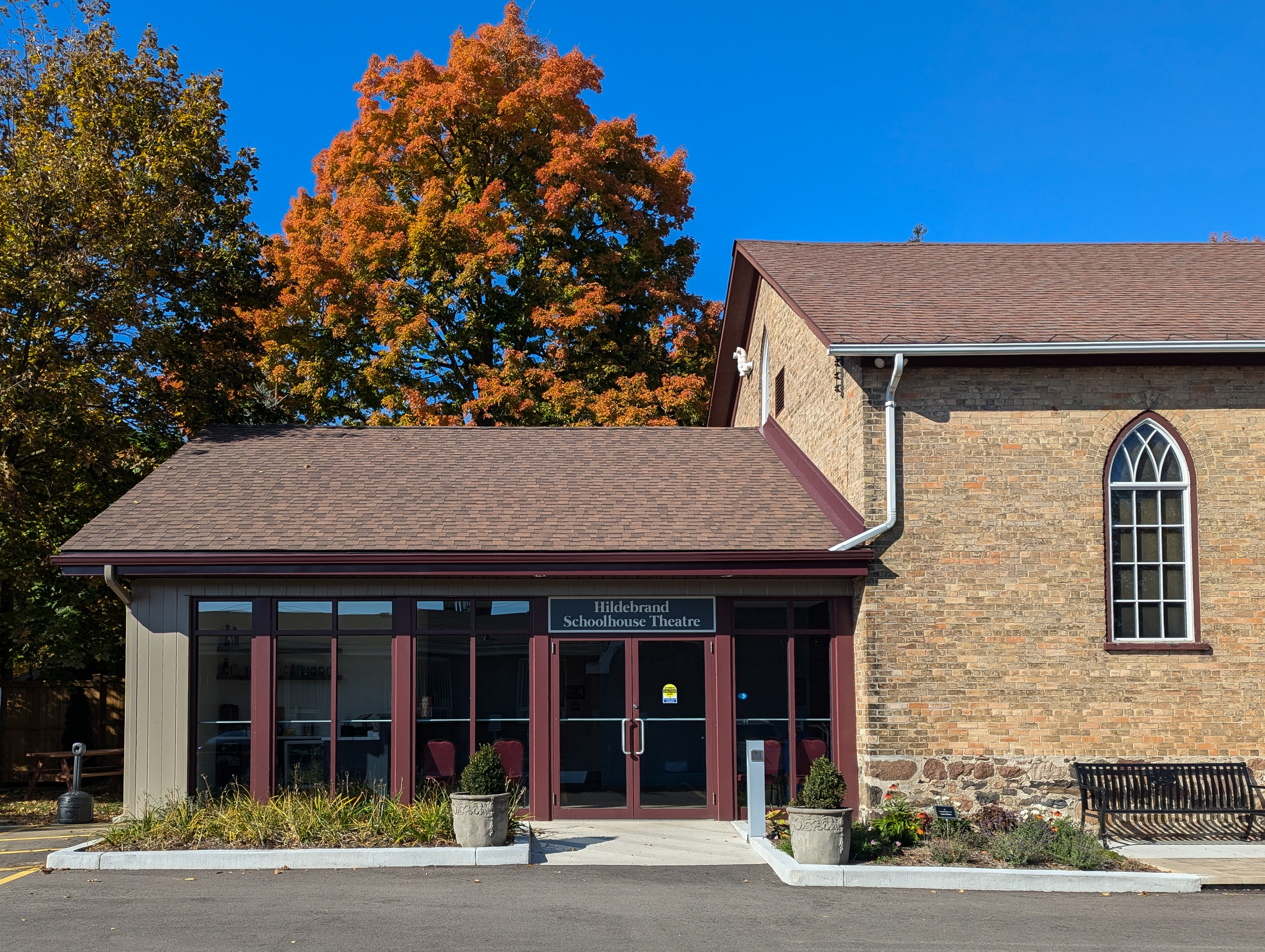
Hildebrand Schoolhouse Theatre

The company expanded to a second stage in St. Jacobs in 1997, in the heart of Mennonite Country. The Schoolhouse Theatre in St. Jacobs is a renovated schoolhouse that was originally built in 1867. In the fall of 2019, the Mersynergy Charitable Foundation donated the building to Drayton Entertainment.

The inaugural production was the musical Forever Plaid, which sold all of its 25,000 available seats. Sold-out performances continued in 1998 with the whodunit Shear Madness – in fact, seats had to be added for most performances to meet demand for tickets, resulting in an overall attendance record of 110 percent.

For the 2000 season, Drayton brought the musical A Closer Walk With Patsy Cline to the St. Jacobs stage. All previous attendance records were broken, as more than 31,000 theatregoers were entertained during the 7-month season.

The theatre was renamed ahead of the 2024 season following a $1 million donation from the Hildebrand family for renovations. The renovation was completed in time for the 2024 season.

=== King’s Wharf Theatre (Penetanguishene) ===
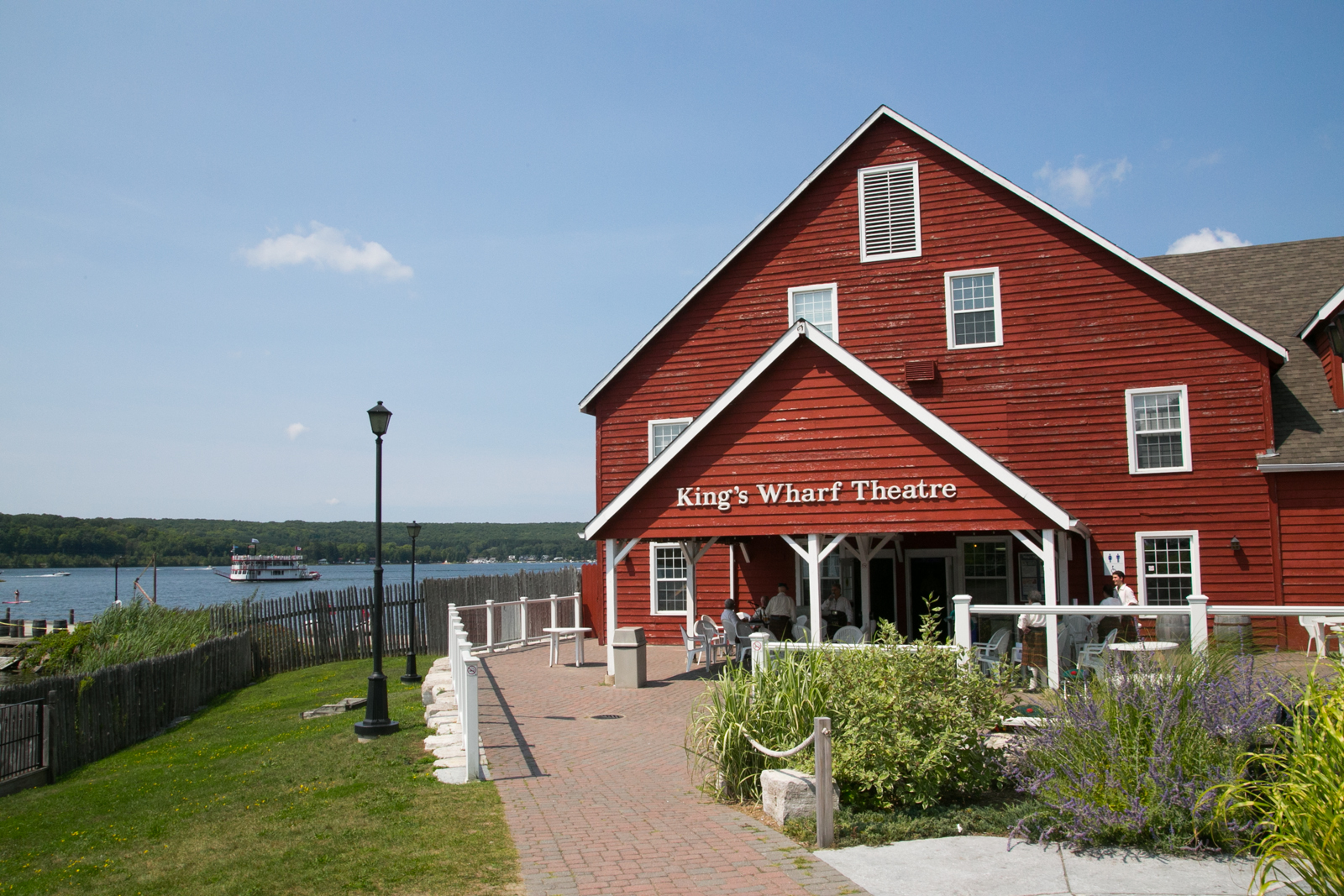
Kings Wharf Theatre

In January 1999, newspapers reported that the Drayton Festival Theatre had been chosen by the Ontario Government to assume operation of the King's Wharf Theatre in Penetanguishene. Situated on the shore of Georgian Bay and flanked by tall ships and historic buildings, the King's Wharf Theatre is situated within Discovery Harbour, an original nineteenth century British naval and military base.

The King's Wharf Theatre inaugural production was the musical Me and My Girl. When the 11-week season closed on September 4, 1999, the King's Wharf Theatre had welcomed more than 20,000 visitors.

=== Huron Country Playhouse (Grand Bend) ===
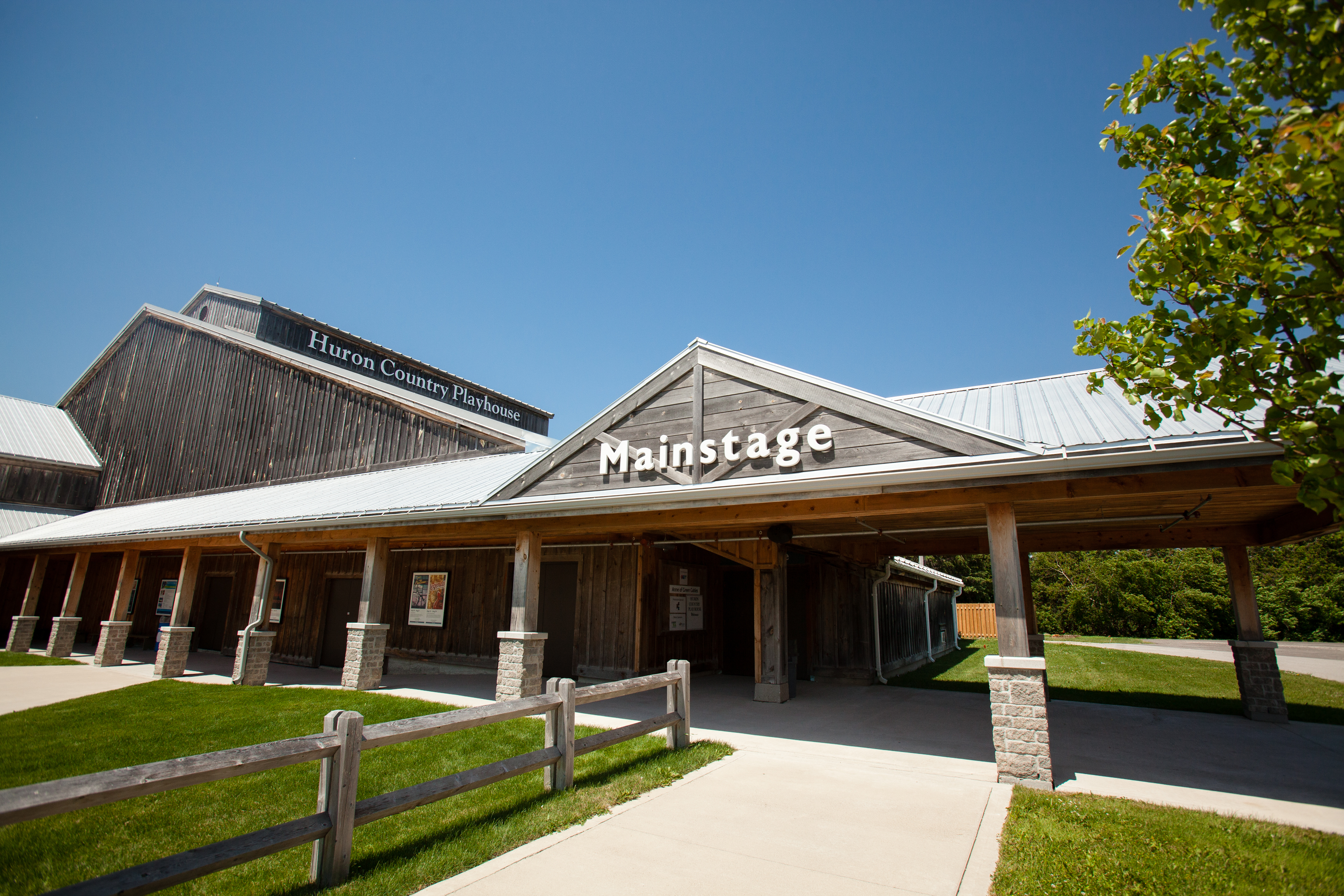
Huron Country Playhouse Mainstage

At a press conference on May 25, 2000 the Drayton Festival Theatre and Huron Country Playhouse announced a merger between the two organizations, creating one new company – Drayton Entertainment.

Huron Country Playhouse launched its 1972 inaugural season in a rented big-top tent while actors and staff lived and worked out of the century-old barn. Audiences are now entertained on two separate stages – the 660-seat Mainstage and 300-seat South Huron Stage.

=== St. Jacobs Country Playhouse (Waterloo) ===
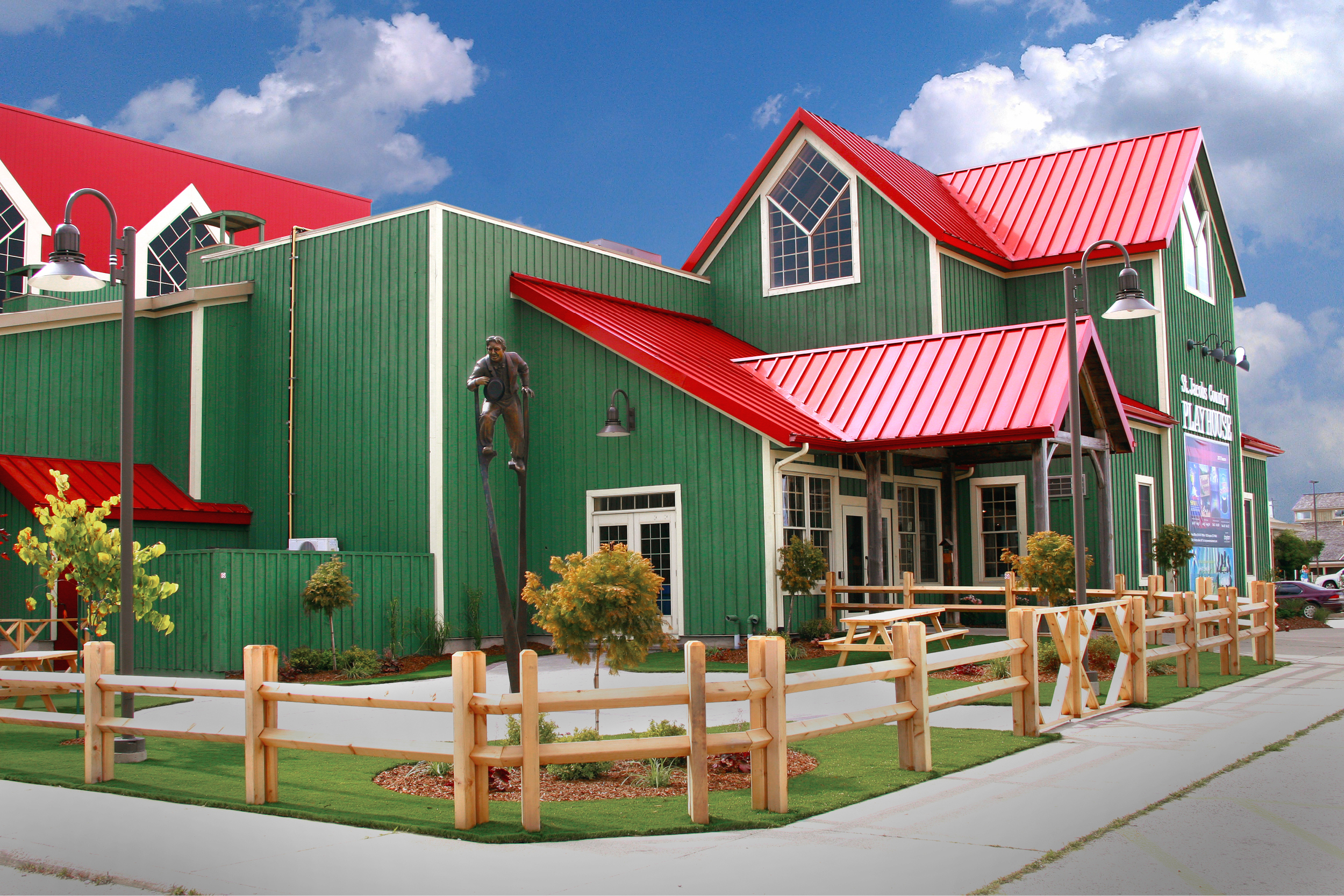
St. Jacobs Country Playhouse

In October 2004, Drayton Entertainment announced it would be expanding its operations in Waterloo with a new performance facility that would be housed in the vacant St. Jacobs Winery & Cidery.

The expansion to a larger venue in Waterloo followed the attendance levels at the Schoolhouse Theatre and reported increases in local business activity, led to the discussion of creating a larger custom-designed theatre on the border of St. Jacobs and the city of Waterloo. The benefits of expansion in this market were numerous, including additional work for artists and administrative staff, potential for new marketing initiatives and national sponsorships.

The St. Jacobs Country Playhouse offers a variety of performances year-round, as well as providing performance space as a resource to the community. The theatre opened in the fall of 2005 with Disney's Beauty and the Beast – completing selling out all 25,000 tickets available for the 8-week run.

=== Hamilton Family Theatre Cambridge (Cambridge) ===
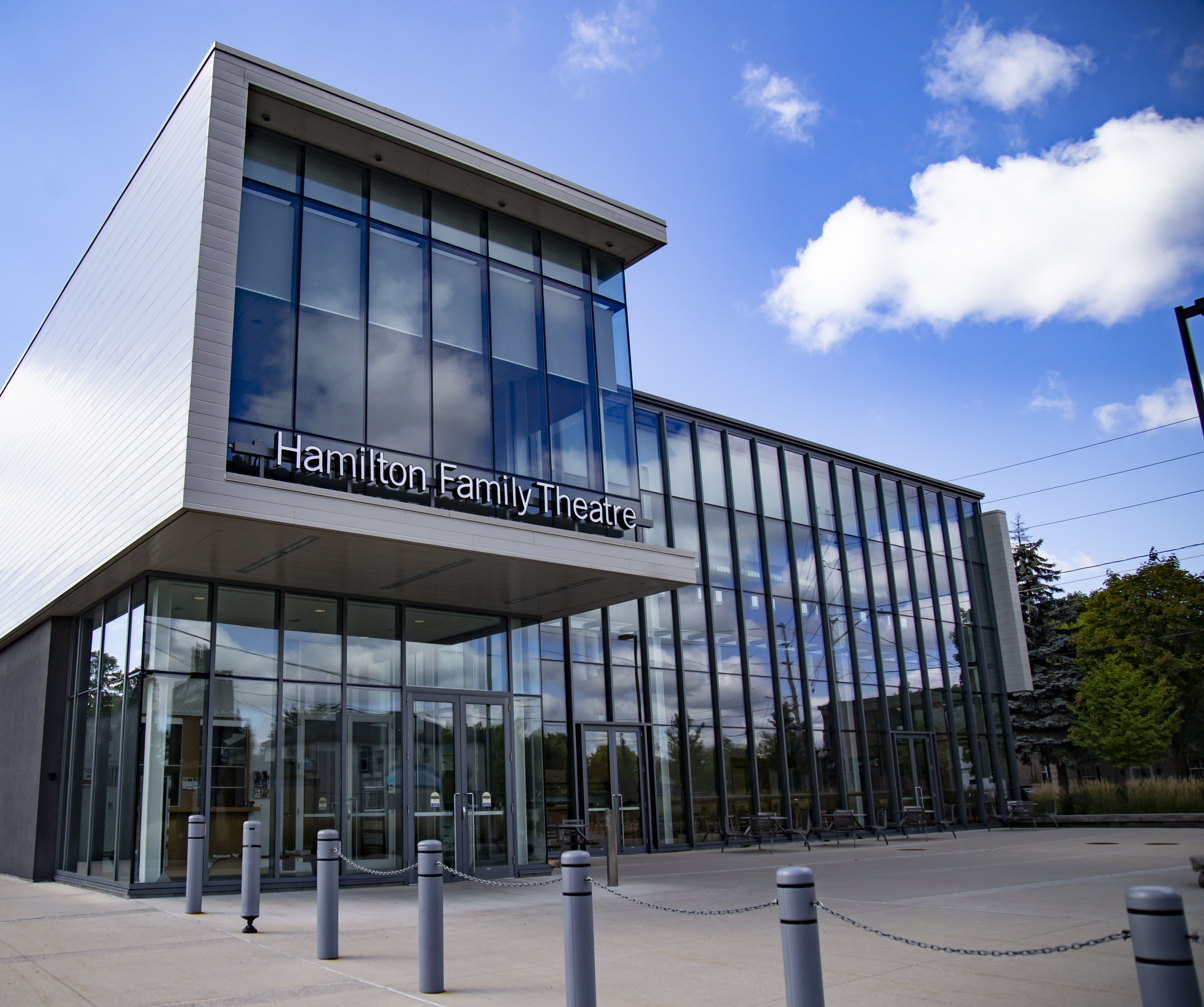
Hamilton Family Theatre Cambridge

In 2009, Cambridge City Council passed a resolution for the development and construction of a 500-seat performing arts venue in the heart of Old Galt, to be operated by Drayton Entertainment. This complex also houses Drayton Entertainment's centralized administration and production facilities. Originally named the Dunfield Theatre Cambridge, the venue opened in the spring of 2013 with Mary Poppins. Funding partners include the Government of Canada, Government of Ontario, the Corporation of the City of Cambridge, and Drayton Entertainment. Cambridge taxpayers paid $6 million, both the federal and city of Cambridge governments paid the same, Drayton Entertainment gave $4.5 million to the project and continually cover daily costs.

In July 2017, Cambridge city council approved a name change for the theatre that took effect in January 2018. Shiplake Properties assumed the original naming rights for the theatre in 2013, as a brand extension of the Dunfield Retirement Residence, a $30 million modern senior retirement living complex located in the Saginaw Parkway and Light Drive neighbourhood. The Toronto-based company sold the building to Revera in the summer of 2017, and it was subsequently renamed Granite Landing. The naming rights for the Cambridge theatre did not transfer with the new ownership.

The Hamilton Family initially contributed $500,000 in 2013 during the theatre's inaugural season, in exchange for naming the auditorium. In 2017, John and Terry Hamilton pledged another $500,000 to assume the exclusive 20-year venue naming rights, valued at $1 million. The theatre has been named the Hamilton Family Theatre Cambridge since January 2018.

== Drayton Entertainment Youth Academy ==
The Youth Academy provides performing and technical arts education.
