= Anne of Green Gables (1958 film) =

1956 television film by Don Harron

- Based on: Anne of Green Gables by Lucy Maud Montgomery
- Written by: Lucy Maud Montgomery
- Screenplay by: James Costigan; Donald Harron; Elaine Lieterman
- Directed by: Donald Harron
- Starring: Elen Willard (as Kathy Willard); Nonnie Griffin; Sharon Acker
- Music by: Norman Campbell
- Country of origin: Canada
- Original language: English

Production
- Producer: Norman Campbell
- Running time: 90 minutes

Original release
- Network: CBC Television
- Release: 18 November 1958

Anne of Green Gables is a CBC Television film produced by Norman Campbell (director) and directed by Don Harron. A remake of the network's like-named 1956 musical rendition of Lucy Maud Montgomery's much-adapted story, it aired on 18 November 1958. By far the most notable departure from its predecessor is the casting of American actress Kathy Willard in the title role.

The film depicts the story of Anne Shirley, an orphan in her early teens, (Note: As the librettist Donald Harron points out in his book, My Double Life: Sexty Yeers of Farquharson around with Don Harn (2012), the novel's specified age progression of 11 through 18 was just not practical for this project, where one performer needs to play the part throughout. Hence, any specific references made by Montgomery to the character's age or the passage of years were omitted in Harron's adaptation.) adopted in the small-town of Avonlea, Prince Edward Island, whose optimistic mindset defies standard ladylike conduct and drives her to overcome any obstacle life throws at her.

== Cast ==
- Kathy Willard as Anne Shirley
- William Cole as Gilbert Blythe
- Margot Christie as Marilla Cuthbert
- John Drainie as Matthew Cuthbert
- Margaret Griffin as Diana Barry
- Sharon Acker as Mrs. Stacey
- Eric House as Mr. Phillips
- Helene Winston as Rachel Lynde
- Araby Lockhart as Mrs. Bell

== Production ==
The 90-minute film, like its predecessor, was produced and distributed by the CBC Folio, a dramatic anthology series presenting original plays and adaptations. It had been slightly expanded in the interim, reportedly now comprising "ten sets, 14 musical and dancing numbers, two of which are new, plus a new ballet", all in conjunction with a seemingly unmanageable multitude of bit players.

On a more tangible note, 10 days prior to the broadcast, on November 8, Folio's supervising producer Robert Allen announced that, owing to unforeseen circumstances (specifically, the fact that Toby Tarnow–who had originally been slated to reprise her starring role–was now not only married, but unmistakably pregnant, Anne would now be played by "New York actress, Kathy Willard". Six days later, the Daily Gleaner reported that producer Norman Campbell had traveled to New York and found his replacement via audition, leading to an additional chorus of Canadian papers noting the last-minute subcontinental stand-in.

== Reception ==
Critical reaction to the Folio's reboot was mixed at best, with perhaps the most merciless assessment emanating from Les Wedman of The Province, who starts his review by dubbing it worthy of a Pulitzer, simply by virtue of being "the biggest egg [laid] in the current Canadian TV season.

What makes the presentation of 'Anne of Green Gables' a double yolk is that it was done once before, in March 1956. Having missed it then, it was too much to expect luck to hold out this time. But having been staged once, who on earth was responsible for trying artificial respiration on it now? It would be unfair to say that the charming, imaginative 'Anne of Green Gables' story should not be done as a musical. It would be correct to say that Norman Campbell, Elaine Leiterman and James Costigan shouldn't have done it.

In a similar vein, Herbert Whitaker of The Globe and Mail notes that the "most remarkable thing" about this musical's remake is "the fact that nobody can sing", adding that "the best musical numbers were those handled by non-singer John Drainle." And yet, he adds, despite the multitude of unacceptable parts, the whole had somehow "accumulated a great deal of unsophisticated charm".

Moving towards the other end of the spectrum is Daily Times TV editor Phil Lee, who dubs the show "something of a paradox", which, despite subpar songs and singing, "somehow managed to emerge as a thoroughly entertaining effort". After briefly acknowledging all behind-the-camera contributors, Lee quickly cuts to the chase. "[O]ne must not forget the star herself, Kathy Willard. For she was the kernel of the success.

Miss Willard is graced with what one might describe as an actress' face. Julie Harris of Broadway has one. Susan Strasberg has one, so has Canada's Frances Hyland and Deborah Kerr and Claire Bloom and Audrey Hepburn. It is a face that can look old and haggard at whim, or gay or sad, beautiful or downright plain. Indeed it was surprising how often Tuesday night Miss Willard reminded one of the grown-up Margaret O'Brien, who currently is developing into the actress she promised to be when she was a child star. In 'Anne of Green Gables,' Miss Willard established herself as a Canadian star. As the stormy petrel who is taken into the home of Matthew Cuthbert in the belief that she is a boy who will help about the farm she had the opportunity to offer almost the entire range of her art. She was the hoyden who insulted Mrs. Lynde for calling her red hair 'carrotty,' who plied a new friend with real wine, who dyed her hair green and fought with Gilbert Blythe on her first day at school. She was also the tender young woman who loved old Matthew with all her heart, her understanding even reaching out to Matthew's stiff-backed sister Marilla. She was brainy even while despising herself for being stupid. She was industrious. And she was student enough to win a scholarship that would have taken her to university. Miss Willard is young enough to go far if she so desires.

Less expansive but similarly impressed was Calgary Albertan critic Bill Ivens.

I did catch another 90-minute musical, CBC Folio's Anne of Green Gables on Tuesday and was vastly pleased with it. New York actress Kathy Willard brought real sparkle to Anne, whom I remember as one of the most tedious heroines in juvenile literature.
