= Canada Rocks! =

2005 Canadian musical theatre revue

CANADA ROCKS! The Hits Musical Revue is a musical theatre show featuring Canadian pop and rock songwriters, musicians and singers. It is a full-length production that was staged at the Confederation Centre of the Arts as part of the 2005 and 2006 season of the Charlottetown Festival in Charlottetown, Prince Edward Island.

The production featured Atlantic Canadian blues artist Matt Minglewood, former Rawlins Cross vocalist Joey Kitson and vocalist Terry Hatty. Canada Rocks! was created by Doug Gallant, Wade Lynch, Hank Stinson and Terry Hatty. The production was workshopped at the Charlottetown Festival's David MacKenzie Theatre in 2004 to overwhelmingly positive response and brought to the festival's main stage the following season. The show's creators considered more than 700 songs from 50 years of Canadian rock, pop, folk, country and traditional music before editing that list down to a more workable 200. In the end the show featured some 75 songs from artists as diverse as Bachman–Turner Overdrive, Ron Hynes, Buffy St. Marie, Dr. Music, Mandala and The Rankins. By the end of its second season it had exceeded $1.2 million in ticket sales to become the festival's second-most successful musical (following Anne of Green Gables: The Musical which has been playing since 1965). Three of the show's creators, Gallant, Lynch and Stinson, are currently collaborating on another musical property for the stage and have two others in waiting.

While its two-season run in 2005–2006 was very profitable, a revival in 2014 only drew an audience of about 300 to the 1000-seat theatre.

== See also ==
- List of festivals in Prince Edward Island
- List of music festivals in Canada
