= Nonnie Griffin =

Canadian actress (1933–2019)

- Born: Lorna Margaret Jean Griffin; 20 October 1933; Toronto, Canada
- Died: 7 June 2019 (aged 85); Toronto, Canada
- Education: Toronto Conservatory; Royal Academy of Dramatic Arts
- Occupations: Actress, playwright, voice artist

Nonnie Griffin (20 October 1933 – 7 June 2019), known as Margaret Griffin until 1964, was a Canadian stage, voice, film and television actress. She spent decades as a performer on CBC Radio's radio dramas in addition to her work onstage at theaters such as the Tarragon Theatre, Centaur Theatre, Bastion Theatre and Royal Alexandra Theatre. She began writing and performing one-woman plays in the 1990s and made her debut at the Edinburgh Festival Fringe in 2012 at age 78. Her television credits include Quentin Durgens (1969), Polka Dot Door (1974-1980) and The Care Bears (1986), though she primarily worked on anthology programmes and teleplays such as General Motors Theatre (1954–58), Playdate (1963) and Festival (1964-1965). At the time of her death, she was rehearsing a one-woman play, Before Scarlett, which was due to premiere two weeks later.

== Biography ==
Griffin was born Lorna Margaret Jean Griffin in Toronto, the oldest of nine children, to Major Gilbert M. Griffin and Catherine Woywitka. She was the great-great-granddaughter of John and Amelia Harris, who built Eldon House, and the great-granddaughter of railway entrepreneur William Mackenzie. Her father came from a wealthy family but became the "black sheep [when he] ran out West and married a Ukranian [sic] girl." Griffin and her siblings were largely raised in poverty, though her parents managed to send her to St. Margaret's Convent School in Kirkfield, Ontario. She began acting in high school and credited Sister Giovanni, who oversaw the school's theater productions, as "one of those special teachers who affect the whole course of your life." She dropped out of Noranda High School after Grade 11 to begin pursuing theatre more seriously. She appeared in her first professional production at age 17 at Jackson's Point's Red Barn Theatre.

Griffin attended the Royal Conservatory of Music in Toronto starting in 1949, studying drama and voice (soprano). Between the ages of 16 and 22, she did summer stock with Ottawa Summer Theater; two seasons at Oakville; one season with the Canadian Repertory Theater (CRT); and assorted productions with the New Play Society, the Red Barn Theatre, Jupiter Theater and CBC-TV's General Motors Theatre.

In 1952, she starred in CRT's production of Three Sisters as Irina alongside Amelia Hall and Betty Leighton. She appeared as Diana Barry in TV movie adaptations of Anne of Green Gables in 1956 and 1958, respectively. She moved to London in 1958, where she joined the company at the Bristol Old Vic and studied under Jeannie Carson. She returned to Canada in 1961, where she continued her work with CBC Radio and stage acting and appeared in soap and detergent commercials. She changed her professional name to Nonnie Griffin in 1964 to distinguish herself from an American actress already registered under the name Margaret Griffin. Griffin began appearing in guest roles in TV shows such as Playdate (1963), Quentin Durgens (1969), Paul Bernard, Psychiatrist (1972), Polka Dot Door (1974-1980) and King of Kensington (1978).

In 1966, Griffin took over the radio show Canadian Short Stories from John Drainie. In 1968, she co-adapted Seán O'Casey's memoir I Knock At the Door into a radio play of the same name, wherein she was the voice of his mother. She also played Ruth Condomine in a CBC Radio adaptation of High Spirits (1970), Emily in Our Town (1982) and Constanze Mozart in a five-part series on CBC Radio's Ideas (1991). Her work on Our Town and Blood Root garnered her a nomination for the Andrew Allan Award in 1982 and 1984, respectively.

In the 1990s, she began writing and performing in a number of one-woman shows, among them: Keats, Yeats and Other Greats (1995), Tea and Poetry (1999), Nonnie In Performance (2003), From Convent to Show Biz (2004) and Showbiz and Other Addictions (2006). Her friend Lorraine Heaton said that Griffin turned to writing "when parts dried up for elderly women." She debuted at the Edinburgh Festival Fringe at age 78 with Sister Annunciata's Secret, wherein she played six different characters. In 2014, she performed Marilyn—After, a play imagining what life might be like for Marilyn Monroe 50 years after her death, which she performed at the SpringWorks Festival in Stratford, Ontario and Toronto's Buddies in Bad Times in 2014 and at the Hamilton Fringe in Ontario in 2015. She continued to tour the show throughout 2015 with Baby Gumm Productions, winning Best International Show at the 2015 United Solo Theatre Festival in New York City. At the time of her death, she was preparing to perform two one-woman shows: Before Scarlett, a play about Margaret Mitchell set to open two weeks after her death, and The Piper's Son.

Griffin, 85, died from a ruptured aortic aneurysm in Toronto on 7 June 2019. Her obituary in The Toronto Star noted she had received her 40-year medallion from Alcoholics Anonymous. Her memoir, Showbiz and Other Addictions, was published in 2002.

== Selected performances ==
=== Film ===
Year	Title	Role	Notes	Refs
1982	If You Could See What I Hear	Mrs. Steffen		
1986	Care Bears Movie II: A New Generation	Harmony Bear (voice)		
1996	The Toy Shop	Henrietta (voice)		
1996	A Husband, a Wife and a Lover	Mrs. Feld		
1996	An Angel for Christmas	Margaret (voice)		
2003	Good Fences			
2011	Wild Life			
2012	Old Stock	Pretty Senior		
2014	Wet Bum	Sylvia		
2016	A Puppy for Christmas	Sweet Elderly Woman		
2018	Stockholm	Old Lady in Bank		

=== Stage ===
Year	Title	Role	Theatre/Company	Notes	Refs
1952	Three Sisters	Irina	Canadian Repertory Theatre		
1953	Ring Round the Moon		Jupiter Theatre	At Royal Alexandra Theatre	
1953	The Blood is Strong	Kate MacDonald	Jupiter Theatre	At Ryerson Institute of Technology	
1954	Charley's Aunt	Ela Delahay	Crest Theatre		
1957	Ah, Wilderness!	Muriel	Crest Theatre		
1960	The Comedy of Errors	Luciana	Bristol Old Vic		
1964	The Little Hut	Wife	Avon Theatre/Poor Alex Theatre		
1965	The Provok'd Wife	Lady Brute	Crest Theatre		
1971	Uncle Vanya	Eléna	Centaur Theatre		
1972	Plaza Suite	Karen Nash/Muriel Tate/Norma Hubley	Bastion Theatre		
1973	How the Other Half Loves	Fiona Foster	Theatre Calgary		
1973	A Day in the Death of Joe Egg		Manitoba Theatre Centre		
1974	Born Yesterday	Billie Dawn	Bastion Theatre/Theatre New Brunswick		
1975	Fallen Angels	Julie Sterroll	Red Barn Theatre		
1975	Children	Barbara	Theatre Plus	At St. Lawrence Center	
1976	The Playboy of the Western World	Widow Quin	Centaur Theatre		
1977	The Sea	Mrs. Rafi	Phoenix Theatre		
1979	Waiting for the Parade	Janet	Tarragon Theatre		
1980	Impromptu of Outremont		Tarragon Theatre		
1980	Jitters	Jessica Logan	Centaur Theatre		
1982	Hay Fever	Judith Bliss	Bastion Theatre		
1986	Hamlet	Gertrude	Toronto Free Theatre		
1989	Hello, Dolly!	Dolly Levi	Limelight Dinner Theatre		
2000	Over the River and Through the Woods	Grandma	Mayfield Dinner Theatre		
2000	Wings	Emily Stilson	George Ignatieff Theatre		
2004	Goodbye, Piccadilly	Betty	Red Barn Theatre		
2010	Sister Annunciata's Secret	Various roles	Annex Theatre (Toronto)	One-woman play with six roles; written by Griffin. Also appeared at the Edinburgh Festival Fringe in 2012.	
2014-15	Marilyn—After	Marilyn Monroe	SpringWorks Indie Theatre and Arts Festival/Buddies in Bad Times	One-woman play; written by Griffin	

=== Television ===
Year	Title	Role	Notes	Refs
1954	Hidden Pages	Zelomi	Play: The Ox and the Ass	
1954-58	General Motors Theatre	Various roles		
1956	Anne of Green Gables	Diana Barry	TV movie	
1956-58	CBC Folio	Various	Episodes: "When Soft Voices Die", "Anne of Green Gables"	
1957	Hawkeye and the Last of the Mohicans			
1958	On Camera	Angelina	Episode: "Three to Get Married"	
1960	Armchair Theatre	Stewardess	Episode: "Roman Gesture"	
1960	Armchair Mystery Theatre	Christine	Episode: "Eye Witness"	
1961	Drama 61-67	Rhoda	Episode: "So Long at the Fair"	
1963	Playdate	Princess Victoria	Episode: "The Ninety-Ninth Day"	
1964	The Serial	Caroline Ballachey		
1964-65	Festival	Various	Episodes: "The Close Prisoner", "The Birthday Party"	
1966	The Marvel Super Heroes	Pepper Potts, Enchantress, Scarlet Witch, Black Widow, Girl (voice)		
1969	Quentin Durgens	Denyse Elliot	Episode: "Fade In—Fade Out"	
1972	Paul Bernard, Psychiatrist			
1972	The Whiteoaks of Jalna	Dilly Warkworth		
1973	Royal Suite			
1974-80	Polka Dot Door	Herself (host)		
1978	King of Kensington			
1983	The Littlest Hobo	Mrs. Cavanaugh	Episode: "The Five Labours of Hercules"	
1984	Toronto Trilogy		TV special: "Neighbours"	
1985	Star Wars: Ewoks	Shodu Warrick (voice)		
1986	The Care Bears	Funshine Bear (voice)		
1989	Street Legal			
1989-91	The Raccoons	Mrs. Suey-Ellen Pig		
1994	RoboCop: The Series	Dorothy Murphy		
2002-03	Doc			
2015	Air Crash Investigation	Marion Carroll	Episode: "Titanic in the Sky"	
2015	Backpackers	Old Lady		
