= Anne of Green Gables (disambiguation) =

Anne of Green Gables is a 1908 book by L.M. Montgomery.

Anne of Green Gables may also refer to adaptations of the book:

== Film ==
- Anne of Green Gables (1919 film), a 1919 silent film
- Anne of Green Gables (1934 film), a 1934 film
- Anne of Green Gables (1956 film), a 1956 Canadian television film

== Television ==
=== Canadian television films ===
- Anne of Green Gables (1958 film), a CBC Television film
- Anne of Green Gables (1985 film), a made-for-television CBC drama miniseries
- Anne of Green Gables: The Sequel, a 1987 CBC miniseries sequel to the 1985 work
- Anne of Green Gables: The Continuing Story, a 2000 CBC miniseries
- Anne of Green Gables: A New Beginning, a 2008 CTV miniseries

=== Other television productions ===
- Anne of Green Gables (miniseries), a 1972 miniseries
- Anne of Green Gables (1979 TV series), a Japanese animated television series
- Anne of Green Gables: The Animated Series, a 2001 animated television series
- L.M. Montgomery's Anne of Green Gables, a 2016 television film
- Anne with an E, a 2017 television series based on the novels, originally titled Anne
- Anne Shirley (2025 TV series), a Japanese animated television series

== Others ==
- Anne of Green Gables: The Musical, a 1965 musical scored by Norman Campbell
