= Reel 'N' Roll =

Studio album by Rawlins Cross
- Released: April 13, 1993
- Studio: Solar Audio Recording Studios, Halifax, Nova Scotia
- Genre: Folk
- Length: —
- Label: Ground Swell
- Producer: Hayward Parrott and Rawlins Cross

Rawlins Cross chronology
Crossing the Border (1992)	Reel 'N' Roll (1993)	Living River (1996)

Professional ratings
Review scores
Source	Rating
AllMusic	3/5 stars

Reel 'N' Roll is a Rawlins Cross album. It is the band's third album, released in April 1993 by Ground Swell.

== Composition ==
Tracks 9, 10, 11, and 12 are re-recordings, previously recorded on the band's debut album A Turn of the Wheel.

== Track listing ==
All songs written by Dave Panting, unless otherwise noted.

1. "Reel 'N' Roll" – 4:59
2. "Don't You Be the One" – 3:48
3. "It'll Have to Wait" (Geoff Panting) – 3:15
4. "Long Night" – 5:13
5. "Wedding Gift" – 4:00
6. "Pedestrian Again" (G. Panting) – 2:48
7. "Mystery Tonight" (G. Panting) – 4:40
8. "Dance Hall" – 3:07
9. "Ghost of Love" – 3:32
10. "Turn of the Wheel" (G. Panting) – 2:39
11. "Colleen" – 3:53
12. "MacPherson's Lament" (Traditional) – 3:56

== Personnel ==
Rawlins Cross

- Dave Panting - guitars, mandolin, bouzouki, tenor banjo, backing vocals
- Geoff Panting - piano accordion with midi interface, backing vocals
- Ian McKinnon - highland bagpipe, tin whistle, trumpet, bodhran
- Brian Bourne - bass, chapman stick, backing vocals
- Howie Southwind - drums
- Joey Kitson - lead and backing vocals, harmonica

Guest Musicians

- Chris Mitchell - saxophone on track 3
- Tom Roach - percussion
- Catherine McKinnon - fiddle on track 12
- Allen MacKenzie, John MacLean, and Jack Maclean - highland bagpipes on track 12

Production

- Hayward Parrott - producer, mixing engineer
- Michael Nichols - second engineer
- Doug Aucoin - digital imaging and design
- Kevin Sallows and Bruce Kierstead - logo design
