= Joey Kitson =

Canadian singer

- Also known as: Big City
- Born: Lloyd Joseph Kitson; November 23, 1969 (age 56)
- Origin: Charlottetown, Prince Edward Island, Canada
- Genres: Blues; Folk; Roots; Rock
- Occupation: Singer
- Years active: 1987–present
- Label: Warner Music
- Website: www.joeykitson.com

Joey Kitson (born November 23, 1969) is a Canadian musician, best known as the lead singer of the Celtic rock band Rawlins Cross. Born in Charlottetown, Prince Edward Island, Kitson is also a stage performer, with notable performances in the Charlottetown Festival productions of Anne of Green Gables: The Musical and Canada Rocks!

Kitson first performed in a high school production of Bye Bye Birdie on the Charlottetown Festival stage. Soon after, he and friends formed the Rock Island Blues Band, a popular band touring Prince Edward Island in the 1980s. Through touring and a stint with a regional tourism promotion, he met other members of Rawlins Cross and officially joined the band as their new lead singer in 1993.

In 2006, Kitson starred alongside Matt Minglewood & Terry Hatty in the Charlottetown Festival's 2-year run of Canada Rocks at the Confederation Centre of the Arts. In 2007, he also starred in British Invasion at the Confederation Centre. In 2009 he starred in Stan Rogers – A Matter of Heart, a musical review of legendary Maritime folk musician Stan Rogers at the Mackenzie Theatre in Charlottetown. In support of the review, Kitson released STAN, an eclectic reinterpretation of songs written by Rogers on Warner Music's Ground Swell imprint.

In 2015, Kitson ran as the Progressive Conservative Party of Prince Edward Island candidate in the provincial riding of Charlottetown-Victoria Park. He was defeated by Liberal incumbent Richard Brown.

Joey's son, Julien, is also a musician, releasing his debut album Thirteen at the age of 13. The album earned a Music P.E.I. nomination for Acadian/Francophone Artist of the Year. Julien also performed in productions of Stan Rogers – A Matter of Heart in 2016 at The Guild in Charlottetown, and in 2017 at the Neptune Theatre in Halifax.
