= Upper Canada Repertory Company =

- Formation: 2001
- Type: Theatre group
- Purpose: Shakespeare, Contemporary Drama, Musical Theatre, Training
- Location: Toronto, Ontario, Canada
- Members: 45
- Artistic director: Rochelle Douris
- Notable members: Leni Parker

The Upper Canada Repertory Company is a theatre company in Toronto, Ontario, Canada founded by Rochelle Douris in 2001. It offers a training program for young actors as well as professional stagings of classic and contemporary work.

== Production history ==
- Her Infinite Variety, 2002 (Jane Mallet Theatre)
- Simply Chekhov, 2003 (Jane Mallet Theatre)
- Turks & Infidels, 2003 (Jane Mallet Theatre)
- The Comedy Show, 2004 (Jane Mallet Theatre)
- North Stars, 2005 (Equity Showcase Theatre)
- Troilus and Cressida: Redux, 2006 (Berkeley Street Theatre)
- Macbeth: Reloaded, 2007 (Berkeley Street Theatre)
- A Midsummer Night's Dream, 2008 (Walmer Theatre)
- A Streetcar Named Desire, 2008 (Walmer Theatre)
- Romeo and Juliet, 2009 (The Theatre Centre)
- A Midsummer Night's Dream, 2009 (Marsh Street Theatre)
- A Streetcar Named Desire, 2009 (Marsh Street Theatre)
- The Children's Hour, 2010 (The Theatre Centre)
- Twelfth Night, 2010 (The Theatre Centre)
- "Little Women", 2011 (George Ignatieff Theatre)
- "The Outsiders", 2011 (George Ignatieff Theatre)
- "The Lord of the Flies", 2012 (The Theatre Centre)
- "The Great Gatsby", 2012 (The Theatre Centre)
- "The Taming of the Shrew", 2013 (DanceMakers Theatre)
- "Alice Unchained", 2014 (DanceMakers Theatre)

== Summer Camps ==
Camps since 2011 have included a Shakespeare camp, a Musical Theatre ("Broadway") camp, and a one-week film acting intensive.

== Junior Repertory Company ==
Members of the company participate in actor training at a high level reflecting professional-style training.

Membership is by audition and invitation only.

The program consists of twenty-six classes of training and rehearsal followed by a spring performance. Weekly five-hour class sessions teach acting, improvisation, theatre history, dance and singing, followed by rehearsal and performance of a play.
