= Canadian Stars =

1978 Canadian TV series

- Genre: Talk show
- Country of origin: Canada
- Original language: English
- No. of seasons: 1

Production
- Running time: 30 minutes

Original release
- Network: CBC Television
- Release: 6 November – 29 December 1978

Canadian Stars is a Canadian interview television series that aired on CBC Television in 1978.

== Premise ==
Canadian Stars featured interviews with Canadian-born entertainers of international presence such as Sharon Acker, Susan Clark, Monty Hall, Norman Jewison and Ted Kotcheff.

== Scheduling ==
This half-hour series was broadcast on Mondays at 7:30 p.m. (Eastern) from 6 November to 25 December 1978. Episodes were repeated on Friday at 2:30 p.m. during this same time.
