= Oedipus Rex (1957 film) =

- Directed by: Tyrone Guthrie
- Written by: William Butler Yeats adaptation of the play by Sophocles
- Based on: Oedipus Rex; 429 BC play by Sophocles
- Produced by: Leonid Kipnis
- Starring: Douglas Campbell; Eleanor Stuart; Robert Goodier; Donald Davis
- Cinematography: Roger Barlow
- Edited by: Richard C. Meyer
- Music by: Louis Applebaum
- Distributed by: Motion Picture Distributors
- Release date: January 6, 1957
- Running time: 87 minutes
- Country: Canada
- Language: English
- Budget: $400,000

Oedipus Rex is a 1957 tragedy film, a film version of the Canadian Stratford Festival production of the William Butler Yeats adaptation of the play Oedipus Rex by Sophocles.

The actors performed wearing masks designed by Tanya Moiseiwitsch, as was the practice in Ancient Greek theatre.

== Cast ==
- Douglas Campbell as Oedipus
- Eleanor Stuart as Jocasta
- Robert Goodier as Creon
- William Hutt as Chorus Leader
- Donald Davis as Tiresias
- Douglas Rain as Messenger
- Tony Van Bridge as Man From Corinth
- Eric House as Shepherd / Old Priest
- Roland Bull as Chorus
- Robert Christie as Chorus
- Ted Follows as Chorus
- David Gardner as Chorus
- Bruno Gerussi as Chorus
- Richard Howard as Chorus
- Roland Hewgill as Chorus
- Edward Holmes as Chorus
- James Manser as Chorus
- Louis Negin as Chorus
- Grant Reddick as Chorus
- William Shatner as Chorus
- Bruce Swerdfager as Chorus
- Neil Vipond as Chorus
- Gertrude Tyas as Nurse
- Naomi Cameron as Ismene
- Barbara Franklin as Antigone

== Song ==
In the years following the release of the film, comedic musician Tom Lehrer referred to it in his live shows, theorizing that it had fared poorly at the box office because it lacked a catchy theme song that could draw in audiences. He wrote and performed one in ragtime style, as heard on the 1959 album An Evening Wasted with Tom Lehrer.

== Reception ==
Theresa Loeb Cone of the Oakland Tribune praised the cast, costumes, cinematography and score, but felt that the film was "too pretentious for enjoyment".
