= First Person (1960 TV series) =

- Genre: Drama anthology
- Country of origin: Canada
- Original language: English
- No. of seasons: 1

Production
- Executive producer: Raymond Whitehouse
- Running time: 30 minutes

Original release
- Network: CBC Television
- Release: 8 June 1960 – 8 February 1961

First Person is a Canadian drama television series which aired on CBC Television from 1960 to 1961.

== Premise ==
This dramatic anthology consisted of adapted and original stories whose teleplays were produced out of CBC Toronto.

This series is distinct from Adrienne Clarkson's First Person talk show in 1966.

== Scheduling ==
This half-hour series was first broadcast over 20 weeks on Wednesdays at 10:00 p.m. (Eastern) from 8 June to 19 October 1960. Then it was given a full season on Wednesdays at 8:30 p.m. from 26 October 1960 to 8 February 1961.

== Episodes ==
Some of the teleplays included:

June–October 1960

- The Anniversary (Basil Coleman producer; Michael Jacot writer)
- At the Railing (David Gardner producer; Robert Presnell Jr. writer), starring Martha Buhs and Robert Goulet
- Aunt Jeannie and the Idol (Audrey Piggott writer)
- Bulgarian Bread (Paul Wayne writer)
- The Click of Beads
- Earn Money at Home (W. O. Mitchell writer)
- End of Innocence (Paul Almond producer; Vincent McConnor writer), starring Kenneth Wolff
- Final at Furnell (Melwyn Breen producer; Willis Hall writer), starring Bill Glover and Deborah Turnbull
- Harry (Ted Pope producer; Fletcher Barry writer; Rosemary Timperley adaptation)
- Kukla (Audrey Piggott writer)
- The Magnet (Harvey Hart producer; Hugh Garner writer), starring Don Francks and Charmion King
- The Man Who Knew A Good Thing (George McCowan producer; Herb Hosie writer), starring Michael Forest
- The Man With Two Hands
- Night River (Basil Coleman producer; George Salverson writer), starring Powys Thomas and Terry Carter
- Some Are So Lucky (David Gardner producer; Hugh Garner writer)

October 1960-February 1961

- The Gold Dress (Stephen Vincent writer)
- Guardian Angel (Frederick Hazlett Brennan story; Hugh Garner adaptation)
- Man in Town (John Gray writer)
- A Matter of Some Importance (Roy Shields writer)
- Overlaid (David Gardner producer; Robertson Davies story; Wallace Christie adaptation), based on Davies' theatre play, starring Alex McKee and Aileen Seaton
- The Trouble With Pyecraft (Eric Till producer, H. G. Wells writer; Douglas Cleverdon adaptation), a comedy starring Tony Van Bridge (Pyecraft) and Gillie Fenwick (Formalyn)
- Venice Libretto (Herb Hosie writer)
- Witness to Murder (Wenzell Brown story; M. Charles Cohen adaptation)
- A Woman Called Anne (Basil Coleman producer; Pamela Lee writer), starring Norma Renault, Ruth Springford, and Norman Welsh
