= The Act of the Heart =

1970 film

- Directed by: Paul Almond
- Written by: Paul Almond
- Produced by: Paul Almond; Jennings Lang
- Starring: Geneviève Bujold; Donald Sutherland; Monique Leyrac; Sharon Acker
- Cinematography: Jean Boffety
- Edited by: James Mitchell
- Music by: Harry Freedman
- Production company: Quest Film Productions
- Distributed by: Universal Pictures
- Release date: November 24, 1970
- Running time: 103 minutes
- Country: Canada
- Language: English
- Budget: $450,000 (Canadian)

The Act of the Heart is a 1970 Canadian drama film written, directed and produced by Paul Almond, and starring Geneviève Bujold, Donald Sutherland, Monique Leyrac and Sharon Acker.

== Plot ==
Martha Hayes (Geneviève Bujold) is a devoutly religious young woman from Québec's Côte-Nord who fancies herself as some kind of a saint. She has come to Montreal to serve as a nanny to Russell (Bill Mitchell), the son of a widowed business woman (Monique Leyrac).

Martha joins a church choir and becomes attracted to Father Michael Ferrier (Donald Sutherland), an Augustinian friar who has selected her to sing solo in an interfaith concert. Russell accidentally dies. Martha suffers a crisis in faith and to Ferrier declares her love for him. Ferrier reciprocates and leaves the order so they can live together with Martha singing to support them. Tormented by guilt for betraying her profound religious principles she immolates herself on a hill (Mount Royal) overlooking Montreal.

== Cast ==
- Genevieve Bujold as Martha Hayes
- Donald Sutherland as Father Michael Ferrier
- Monique Leyrac as Johane Foss
- Sharon Acker as Adele
- Eric House as Choirmaster
- Ratch Wallace as Diedrich
- Billy Mitchell as Russell Foss
- Gilles Vigneault as Coach Ti-Jo
- Jean Duceppe as Parks Commissioner
- Suzanne Langlois as Housekeeper (uncredited)

== Comment ==
Reviews of the film were mixed. A disappointment at the box-office, it nevertheless won six Canadian Film Awards - including Direction (Almond) and Lead Actress (Bujold). John Hofsess of Maclean's wrote, "Act of the Heart is the first Canadian feature film that compares in artistic quality and importance with the best of our literature, painting and music".
