= Eric House =

Canadian actor

- Born: November 22, 1921; Toronto, Ontario, Canada
- Died: March 21, 2004 (aged 82); Toronto, Ontario, Canada
- Occupation: actor

Eric House (November 22, 1921 – March 21, 2004) was a Canadian actor. Although he appeared in film, television and stage roles throughout his career, he was most famously associated with stage roles at the Stratford Festival, particularly its productions of musical comedies by Gilbert and Sullivan, and as Dean Drone in Sunshine Sketches, the first Canadian television drama series.

House was born and raised in Toronto, Ontario. After serving in the Canadian military during World War II, he enrolled as a geography student at the University of Toronto, and began acting with the Hart House Theatre. He joined the Canadian Repertory Theatre in 1951, and subsequently acted at Stratford and with the Toronto-based Crest Theatre. He was a founding member of the Canadian Actors' Equity Association. He also worked in theatre across Canada, both as an actor and a director, and had a number of roles on Broadway in New York City, appearing in productions of Tamburlaine, The Makropulos Affair, Two Gentlemen of Verona, Soldiers and H.M.S. Pinafore, and at least one role in London's West End, in a production of Mrs. Gibbons' Boys. In 1962, he appeared alongside Corinne Conley, Dave Broadfoot, Jack Creley and Eric Christmas in the musical revue Clap Hands at London's Hammersmith Theatre.

His film roles included Anne of Green Gables (1956), and Oedipus Rex (1957), while his television roles included frequent appearances in the CBC Television drama anthology series Playdate, Folio and Festival, A Gift to Last and the shortlived comedy series Delilah. He received a Canadian Film Award nomination for Best Actor in 1969 for his performance in "The Night Nothing Happened", an episode of the drama series Quentin Durgens, M.P..

In later years he returned to Stratford, appearing in productions of Hamlet and Troilus and Cressida. His final television role was a small appearance as a judge in two episodes of Street Legal.

He died of emphysema on March 21, 2004.

== Filmography ==
Year	Title	Role	Notes
1957	Oedipus Rex	Shepherd / Old Priest	
1961	Jake and the Kid	Repeat Golightly	
1970	The Act of the Heart	Choirmaster	
1974	A Star Is Lost!	Alfred E. Sydney	
1978	High-Ballin'	Slater	
1982	Highpoint	Rico	
1983	Strange Brew	John Elsinore	
1987	Candy Mountain	Doctor	
