= If You Could See What I Hear =

- Film poster
- Directed by: Eric Till
- Written by: Derek Gill; Stuart Gillard
- Produced by: Eric Till; Gene Corman (executive producer)
- Starring: Marc Singer; R. H. Thomson; Sarah Torgov; Shari Belafonte Harper
- Cinematography: Harry Makin
- Edited by: Eric Wrate
- Music by: Michael Lloyd; Helen Reddy; Eric N. Robertson; Tom Sullivan
- Production companies: Cypress Grove; Shelter Films
- Distributed by: Ciné 360 Inc.; Jensen Farley Pictures
- Release dates: January 7, 1982 (Japan); April 23, 1982 (United States)
- Running time: 103 minutes
- Country: Canada
- Language: English
- Budget: CAD $5,600,000 (estimated)
- Box office: USD $8,693,512 or $4.7 million

If You Could See What I Hear is a 1982 Canadian biographical drama film about blind musician Tom Sullivan, starring Marc Singer and Shari Belafonte, directed by Eric Till.

== Plot summary ==
Tom Sullivan is a blind college student who wants to be normal. When not in class, Tom hangs out with his friend, Will Sly, who does not treat him like a blind person. In fact, he goes out of his way to challenge Tom. Tom likes to go jogging while Will leads him on his bicycle. Will leads him past obstacles such as park benches, shouting out "Bench!" at the last moment so Tom has to jump over it.

On campus, Tom meets a black woman named Heather Johnson, with whom he falls in love. But she breaks off the relationship because "the black and white thing," coupled with Tom's blindness, is too complicated for her. Crushed by Heather's abandonment and experiencing loneliness, Tom continues to struggle with himself, still denying that his blindness affects his "normalcy". Then he meets his future wife, Patti Steffen, and his life changes irreversibly.

The movie is most famous for the scene where, while Tom is on the phone with Will, Patti's little sister Blythe falls in the family swimming pool and nearly drowns. Tom, upon realizing she is missing, manages to find her at the bottom of the pool and save her life. In reality, this extraordinary incident occurred several years after Tom's marriage to Patti; and the little girl he saved from drowning was, in fact, his own daughter, Blythe.

== Cast ==
- Marc Singer as Tom Sullivan
- R. H. Thomson as Will Sly
- Shari Belafonte as Heather Johnson
- Harvey Atkin as Bert
- Helen Burns as Mrs. Ruxton
- Douglas Campbell as Porky Sullivan
- David Gardner as Jack Steffen
- Nonnie Griffin as Mrs. Steffen
- Sharon Lewis as Helga
- Adrienne Pocock as Blythe Steffen
- Sarah Torgov as Patti Steffen

== Production ==
Stuart Gillard served as a writer and co-producer on the film about two years in the life of Tom Sullivan with whom he's friends in real life. The movie was filmed on location in Toronto and Nova Scotia. Sullivan served as a consultant on the film.

== Reception ==
The film was critically panned. Roger Ebert pointed out that the film was intended to be "inspirational and uplifting" and stated that Sullivan "comes across in this movie like a refugee from Animal House. His idea of overcoming his handicap is to party all night." He and Gene Siskel selected the film as one of the worst of the year in a 1982 episode of Sneak Previews. In a review for The New York Times, Janet Maslin was negative in her assessment, criticizing the overly "cute" portrayal of Sullivan and writing, "Eric Till, the director, makes this a movie in which nothing truly perilous can possibly happen to anyone."
