= Make It on Time =

Make it on Time

Studio album by Rawlins Cross
- Released: November 2, 1998 (Canada)
- Genre: Folk
- Label: Warner Music
- Producers: Dave and Geoff Panting

Rawlins Cross chronology
Celtic Instrumentals (1997)	Make it on Time (1998)	Anthology (2008)

Make it on Time is Rawlins Cross' sixth and final album.

== Track listing ==
1. "Boogieland"
2. "Crossroad"
3. "Near Dearly Departed"
4. "You Will Always Have My Love"
5. "Make It on Time"
6. "Some People"
7. "Where Would I Be"
8. "French Painter"/"Drive'er Down"
9. "Don't Wait on Me"
10. "Rockaway"
11. "Two Islands"
12. "Deep Blue"
13. "Navvy on the Line"/"Jim Hodder's Reel"
14. "Winter's Tale"
