= Don Harron =

Canadian actor and comedian (1924–2015)

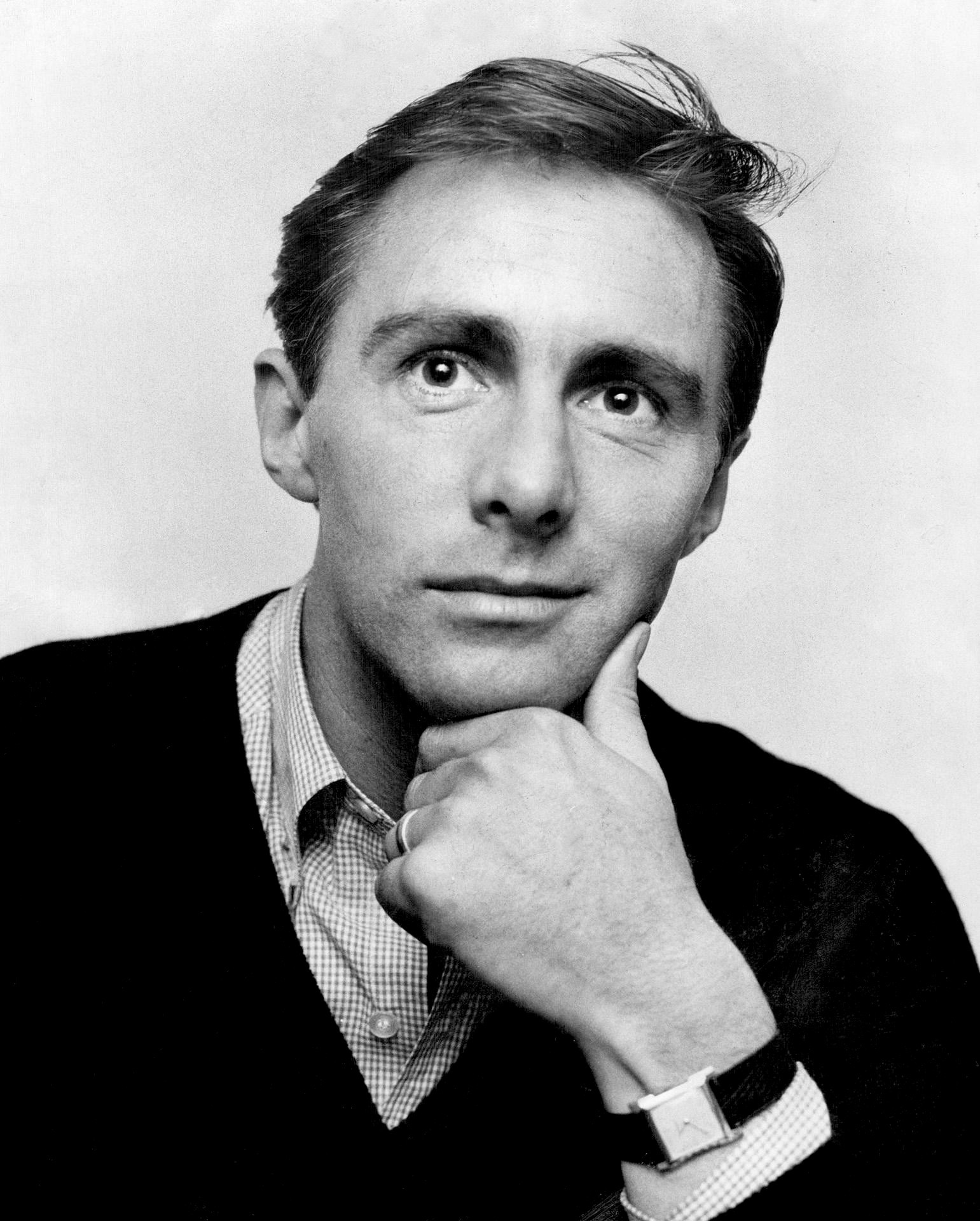
- Harron in 1961
- Born: Donald Hugh Harron; September 19, 1924; Toronto, Ontario, Canada
- Died: January 17, 2015 (aged 90); Toronto, Ontario, Canada
- Notable work: Charlie Farquharson; Anne of Green Gables – The Musical; Morningside
- Spouses: Gloria Fisher (m. 1949; div. 1960); Virginia Leith (m. 1960; div. 1968); Catherine McKinnon (m. 1969; div. 2003); Claudette Gareau (m. 2012)
- Children: Martha, Mary, Kelley

Comedy career
- Years active: 1935–2013
- Medium: Television
- Genres: Satire, character comedy
- Subjects: Current events, rural humour

Donald Hugh Harron, OC OOnt (September 19, 1924 – January 17, 2015) was a Canadian comedian, actor, director, journalist, author, playwright, and composer. Harron is best remembered by American audiences as a member of the cast of the long-running country music series Hee Haw, on which he played his signature character of Charlie Farquharson.

== Early life ==
Harron's parents, Lionel William Harron and Delsia Adah Maud Hunter Harron, owned and operated Harron's Cleaners and Dryers in Toronto. Beginning at the age of ten, he earned extra money for the family during the Great Depression, doing "chalk talks" telling humorous stories while drawing caricatures in coloured chalk at company or club banquets, making $10 or $15 a talk. As a result of his performances, he was invited to audition for, and won, a part in the Canadian Radio Broadcasting Commission radio series Lonesome Trail in 1935.

As a teenager, Harron spent time working as a farm hand in rural Ontario; experience he later credited for the development of his Charlie Farquharson character. He graduated from Vaughan Road Collegiate Institute in 1942 and briefly attended the University of Toronto before enlisting in the Royal Canadian Air Force in 1943. After the Second World War, he completed his studies of sociology and philosophy receiving a Bachelor of Arts degree. While at school he performed in amateur and professional productions, won the Victoria College drama award, and composed the music and lyrics for a student musical. He won the gold medal in philosophy and the regent's silver medal and was offered a position teaching literature at the university which he turned down in order to focus on performing.

== Career ==
After university, Harron appeared in a number of plays and revues in Toronto, including the annual Spring Thaw revue, giving him national exposure when the 1952 edition was broadcast on the newly launched CBC Television network. He spent two years in London, England, travelling there variously performing in a West End production of A Streetcar Named Desire and also working for the BBC as a comedy writer, acting in a radio series, playing the part of a clown in the film The Red Shoes (1948), and writing scripts for Gracie Fields.

Returning to North America in the 1950s, Harron was featured in the inaugural season of the Stratford Shakespeare Festival in Ontario as the male lead in All's Well That Ends Well and a minor part in Richard III and on Broadway and was one of the writers on the first English-language dramatic series broadcast in Canada, Sunshine Sketches, which aired from 1952 to 1953 on CBC Television. Harron also co-wrote the script for the 1956 television musical Anne of Green Gables. Harron later adapted the production for the stage in 1965 as Anne of Green Gables: The Musical, which continues to be performed annually during the Charlottetown Festival. According to Harron in a 2008 interview with the Calgary Herald, the stage show has provided work for more than 10,000 actors since its inception.

Harron played Art Harris in the two-part The Outer Limits episode titled "The Inheritors" (1964), in Voyage to the Bottom of the Sea ("Doomsday", 1965) as the naval missile officer aboard the SSRN Seaview who could not bring himself to perform his duties to launch nuclear missiles, The Man from U.N.C.L.E. ("The Four-Steps Affair", also 1965) as an Australian U.N.C.L.E. agent named Kitt Kittridge, and in 12 O'Clock High ("The Ticket", 1965) as Lt. Crain. He guest-starred in the premiere episode of the television series Blue Light (1966), which was later edited together with the three following episodes to create the theatrical film I Deal in Danger. Harron starred in the original 1965 television pilot of The Man Who Never Was as Mark Wainwright but a change in sponsor led to the new sponsor requesting Robert Lansing in the role.

He made one appearance on the CBC Television show Adventures in Rainbow Country in the episode "The Frank Williams File" (1969). He has also been a host and interviewer on Canadian television and radio, hosting CBC Radio's Morningside from 1977 to 1982, for which he received an ACTRA Award for best radio host, and subsequently hosting an afternoon talk show, The Don Harron Show on CTV from 1983 to 1985. He had a featured role in Arthur Hiller's film The Hospital (1971), written by Paddy Chayefsky. He replaced Gene Wood as host of the game show Anything You Can Do from 1972 to 1974.

=== Charlie Farquharson ===
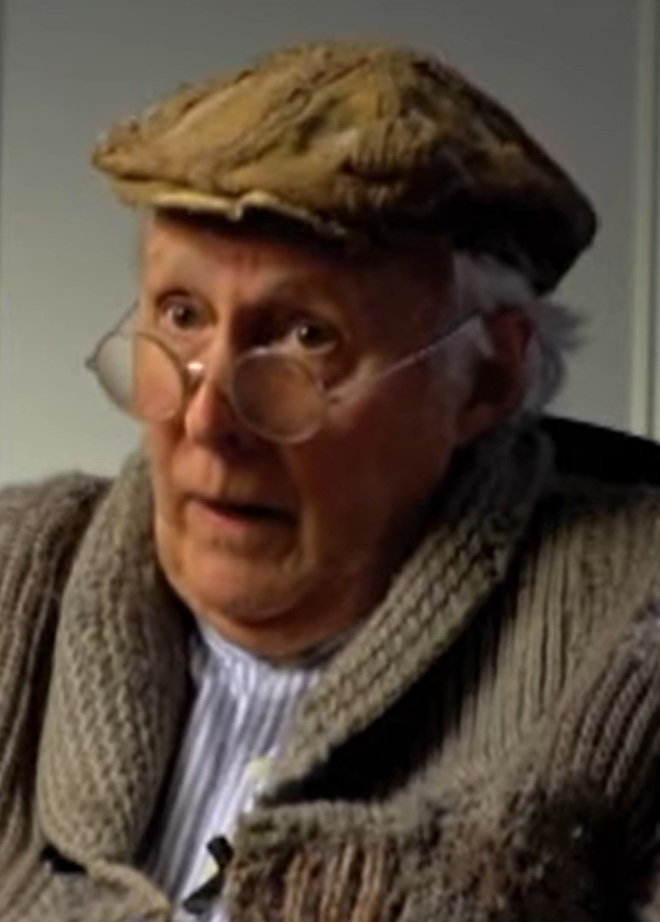
Harron as Charlie Farquharson in 2007

Harron is known for the character Charlie Farquharson /ˈfɑːrkəsən/, a personality he first portrayed in 1952 on the CBC series The Big Revue. For the following half-century-plus, Harron performed the character regularly on stage and on Canadian radio and television. As well, the character received international attention as part of the cast of the U.S. country music television show, Hee Haw during its 23-year run; on that series, which ran from 1969 to 1992, Harron portrayed a rural anchorman for station KORN, and concluded the final story of each newscast with a cutthroat gesture. Harron reprised the character on The Red Green Show in 2003 and 2004.

Dressed in an overly well-worn sweater along with a frayed cap, and sporting a grizzled "two-day beard", Farquharson is a decidedly rural Ontario farmer from the real-life town of Parry Sound. He and his wife, Valeda, have a son, Orville. Both were usually unseen and unheard, but on occasion (mostly on stage) Harron's wife Catherine McKinnon would play the role of Valeda. Uneducated, but not without a boisterous "school of hard knocks" sensibility, Charlie would loudly deliver his opinion about matters local and worldwide, using many malapropisms in the process which often resulted in both double meanings and increased satire about the events. He was also known for his loud hearty laugh, "Hee! Hee! Hee!". In addition to his television appearances as Charlie, through the 1970s and 80s Harron provided humorous syndicated commentaries to various Canadian radio stations in the Farquharson persona. As well, he published several books in the persona of the character, reproducing the malapropisms in print and including strange photos and woodcuts as illustrations.

Examples of Farquharson's comments:

- "Nowadaze Parry Sound looks like most uther towns on this continence, thanks to them branched plants of frenchfrises that has sprung up everywhere – Mickdonald's, Burglar King, Kernel Kadaffy Frayed Chicken. Noware will ya see a sine "Home Cookin'", cuz all our lo-cal burghers is out eaten them malty-nashnul burgurs. This makes everplace into a no place, and it's eezy to fergit ware you is if yer jist passin through at snacktime."
- "Every guvmint estimit incloods an extry estimit of how much more it's gonna cost than yer ferst estimit. That's how come they always leeve this big deficit on the floor of yer House. And a deficit is what you've got wen you haven't got as much as if you jist had nothin'. If we tried any of this, we'd end up in jail. But the guvmint gits rid of its detts by Nashnullizing them. That's like the alkyholick who solved his problem by poring the booze in all of his bottles into one big container. Himself."

In May 2001, Don performed the Charlie Farquharson character during the 75th anniversary of his Toronto high school, Vaughan Road Collegiate Institute. His commentary included a reference to former US president Bill Clinton's sexual dalliance with Monica Lewinsky. "He deified yer 11th Commandment - Thou shalt not put thy rod before thy staff."

== Honours ==
In 2000, Harron's contribution to the Canadian entertainment industry was recognized with his being named a member of the Order of Ontario. He was invested as member of the Order of Canada in 1980 and in 2007, he was given the Gemini Award for Lifetime Achievement in Radio and Television. Harron was also appointed a UNICEF Goodwill Ambassador. In his later years, he was a high-profile advocate for the interests of older people. He also continued to write books, most recently (2008) publishing a retrospective work on the history of the Anne of Green Gables musical to tie in with the 100th anniversary of the original novel.

Harron was inducted into the Canadian Country Music Hall of Fame in 2010.

== Personal life ==
Harron's first marriage was to Gloria Fisher, his second from 1960 to 1968 was to actress Virginia Leith. He married his third wife, Canadian singer Catherine McKinnon in 1969. Harron and McKinnon divorced in 2003. He moved in with and later married his fourth wife, Claudette Gareau, who had played the separatist weather girl in Shh! It's the News (1973) appearing with Harron.

Harron's daughter Mary Harron from his marriage to Fisher, is an independent film director whose credits include I Shot Andy Warhol and American Psycho. She directed Alias Grace which won the 2018 Canadian Screen Award for Best Limited Series.

Harron died at 90 surrounded by his family in his Toronto home after deciding not to seek treatment for his cancer. His daughter, Martha, told Canadian Press "He was still sharp. He was still capable of being funny even though his voice was barely above a whisper... It's horribly sad, but it's beautiful too."

== Selected bibliography ==
Harron authored 17 books – most of them in character as Charlie Farquharson with titles spelled in the character's idiolect, as well as his 2012 memoir:

- Charlie Farquharson's Histry of Canada (McGraw-Hill Ryerson, 1972) ISBN 0-07-092530-5
- Charlie Farquharson's Jogfree of Canda (Gage, 1974)
- Charlie Farquharson's K-O-R-N Filled Allmynack (Gage, 1976) - a tie-in with Hee Haw
- Olde Charlie Farquharson's Testament: From Jennysez to Jobe and After Words (MacMillan of Canada, 1978) ISBN 0-7715-9900-5
- Yer Last Decadent: 1972-1982 (MacMillan of Canada, 1982)
- Cum Buy The Farm (MacMillan of Canada, 1987)
- Charlie Farquharson's Unyverse (MacMillan of Canada, 1990)
- Charlie Farquharson's Histry of Canda: ReeVised and More Expansive (MacMillan of Canada, 1992)
- Charlie's A Broad: Travails In Fern Parts (MacMillan of Canada, 1994)
- My Double Life: Sexty Yeers of Farquharson Around With Don Harn (Dundurn, 2012)

== Filmography ==
Year	Title	Role	Notes
1952	The Sound Barrier	ATA Officer	Uncredited
1959	The Best of Everything	Sidney Carter	
1959	One Step Beyond - Doomsday (TV)	Will	Season 2, Episode 4, October 13, 1959
1965	The Spy with My Face	Kittridge	
1966	I Deal in Danger	Spauling	
1967	Mosby's Marauders	Gen. Stoughton	
1971	The Hospital	Milton Mead	
1975	The Human Collision		
