= The Stranger (1973 film) =

1973 American science fiction television film

- VHS cover
- Created by: Gerald Sanford
- Directed by: Lee H. Katzin
- Starring: Glenn Corbett; Cameron Mitchell; Sharon Acker; Lew Ayres
- Music by: Richard Markowitz
- Country of origin: United States
- No. of episodes: 1

Production
- Producer: Alan A. Armer
- Cinematography: Keith C. Smith
- Editors: Nick Archer; Melvin Shapiro
- Running time: 100 minutes

Original release
- Network: NBC
- Release: February 26, 1973

The Stranger is a 1973 science fiction television pilot directed by Lee H. Katzin, and starring Glenn Corbett and Cameron Mitchell.

Independent film production and distribution company Film Ventures International (FVI) re-issued The Stranger to syndication under the title Stranded in Space. As with other films released by FVI, the opening credits for Stranded in Space featured footage from an entirely unrelated film, in this case the 1983 low-budget science fiction film Prisoners of the Lost Universe.

== Plot ==
While on a space mission, NASA astronaut Neil Stryker (Glenn Corbett) crashes and is hospitalized in quarantine for a long period of time. He is uninjured, although his two fellow astronauts were apparently killed in the crash.

Stryker becomes suspicious when he tries to ask why he is being held for so long and can't get any reasonable explanation. It turns out that he is being closely observed by Dr. Revere (Tim O'Connor) and government agent Benedict (Cameron Mitchell), while being interrogated in his sleep after being given powerful drugs. The drugs reveal that Stryker is from another planet (Earth), and his society is one where there is freedom of thought and speech. Revere is clearly concerned by the strain of the drugs on Stryker, but is caught between the concern for the patient and his responsibility to the government, while Benedict is indifferent to Stryker's wellbeing.

Stryker eventually escapes the hospital after being injured and nearly killed by the security forces. When trying to make a call to Cape Kennedy at a telephone booth, he is shocked to find that the operator has never heard of it, or even the state of Florida. He hitches a ride and begins to realize that he is not on planet Earth, after seeing subtle differences such as three moons in the sky and discovering that the inhabitants of the planet are all left-handed.

Stryker soon visits a book store, where he researches the planet. The twin planet, which is on the far side of the Sun and unknown to Earth, is known to its inhabitants as Terra. It has a system of government and citizen comradeship that is alien to Stryker – the Perfect Order. The enforcement of the order is facilitated by a hierarchy of officials who scrutinize their subordinates extremely closely, pervasive inspirational propaganda, and electronic monitoring through technology including telephones, televisions and car radios.

The Perfect Order has only been around for about 35 to 40 years, after a terrible war. The order was instituted to foster a sense of family among every person on Terra, to help each other and think of each other and the good of the whole. People with incompatible ideas are removed and reconditioned; if they still do not conform, they are executed. Culture has been heavily excised (no concerts in the park), religion outlawed, and alcoholic drinks are viewed as a future target to eliminate. Among its accomplishments, the Perfect Order has eliminated physical suffering and poverty and has a vibrant space program. The hospital has a "Ward E" where people are apparently lobotomized, and can no longer leave and join society. Benedict and his superiors are terrified that Stryker, being an extra-terrestrial and from a society that espouses freedom of thought, will influence people on Terra to rebel against the Perfect Order, and they have resolved to kill him before he can "infect" the population.

Stryker eventually encounters and befriends Dr. Bettina Cooke (Sharon Acker) and her colleague, Professir Dylan MacAuley (Lew Ayres). Although Bettina is attracted to him, she is torn between Stryker and her loyalty to the Perfect Order, and she informs Benedict of Stryker's whereabouts. Benedict sends a helicopter to kill Stryker, who has commandeered Bettina's car and is attempting to escape, but the chopper collides with a windmill and crashes. Stryker and Dylan determine to get Stryker aboard a Terran spacecraft about to be launched, with Stryker intending to replace its astronaut and pilot the ship back to Earth.

Meanwhile, Benedict tracks down Bettina and has her violently tortured, lobotomized, and conditioned to help lead him to Stryker. Benedict and his people arrive at the space complex in sufficient time to stop him before the rocket can launch with him aboard. Dylan is shot and killed while Stryker leads Benedict's team on a chase through the complex. The authorities corner him close to the liquid oxygen tanks, where nobody dares use guns.

Stryker jumps into the ocean while firing at the LOX tanks, igniting a fire. Benedict's lieutenant, Henry Maitland (Steve Franken), feels sure Stryker could not have survived, but Benedict will settle for nothing less than Stryker's remains as proof. Meanwhile, Stryker wades ashore north along the coast, right where the Nelson family is camping. He gives an alias, says his boat capsized, and is welcomed by Tom Nelson to join them for their pleasure trip north. Before following the family to their van, he turns to regard the three alien moons, and remembers Dylan telling him it wasn't impossible that he should get home.

== Cast ==
In order of appearance

- Glenn Corbett as Neil Stryker
- Jerry Douglas as Steve (astronaut)
- Arch Whiting as Mike (astronaut)
- Tim O'Connor as Dr. Revere
- Cameron Mitchell as Benedict
- H. M. Wynant as Eric Stoner
- Sharon Acker as Dr. Bettina Cooke
- William Bryant as Truck Driver
- Steve Franken as Henry Maitland
- George Coulouris as the Bookseller
- Lew Ayres as Prof. Dylan MacAuley
- Dean Jagger as Carl Webster
- Virginia Gregg as Ward E Administrator
- Steven Marlo as Guard
- Ben Wright as space complex doctor
- Buck Young as Tom Nelson

== Production ==
The project was produced by Bing Crosby Productions.

The idea of an astronaut landing on a twin planet orbiting the Sun exactly opposite Earth was used in the film Doppelgänger (also known as Journey to the Far Side of the Sun), produced four years earlier, in 1969.

Chrysler Corporation is listed in the credits at the end of the film for providing the automobiles. A Chevy Van was used toward the beginning of the film, and the bowtie on the grille was accordingly disguised. Bettina Cooke drives a 1972 Plymouth Fury III 4 door hardtop, and Dylan drives a 1972 Dodge Dart Demon.

== MST3K appearance ==
In June 1991, the film was presented in its Film Ventures International iteration as part of an episode of the movie-mocking television series Mystery Science Theater 3000.

== See also ==
- 1973 in television
- Orwellian
- The Prisoner - British TV series similar in content
