= Catherine McKinnon =

Canadian actress and singer (born 1944)

- Born: May 14, 1944 (age 82); Saint John, New Brunswick, Canada
- Genres: Folk; pop
- Occupations: Actor, singer
- Spouse: Don Harron (m. 1969; div. 2003)

Catherine McKinnon (born May 14, 1944) is a Canadian actress and folk/pop singer.

== Early life and education ==
Born in Saint John, New Brunswick, McKinnon began as a child performer, making her debut radio broadcast at age eight and her television appearance at age 12. She subsequently studied music at Mount Saint Vincent University in Halifax.

== Career ==
In the 1960s she was a regular on CBC radio and television, including the Halifax based CBC television program Singalong Jubilee. In 1964, she popularized the song "Farewell to Nova Scotia" when she used it as the theme song for the Singalong Jubilee.

McKinnon's first and biggest selling album, Voice of an Angel, was a collection of folk material, but she has also recorded ballads, torch songs, and songs by notable pop songwriters such as Leonard Cohen, Joni Mitchell, Gordon Lightfoot and Buffy Sainte-Marie. She has also been a stage actress, appearing in Canadian productions of Turvey, The Wizard of Oz, and My Fair Lady.

== Personal life ==
McKinnon married actor and comedian Don Harron in 1969; the couple divorced in 2003.

Her sister, Patrician Anne McKinnon, began her singing career on CBC Television at age 13 and had a Canadian hit single entitled "Blue Lipstick" in 1965. "Blue Lipstick" was written especially for her by American composer P. F. Sloan, who also wrote for Terry Black. She was featured on both Voice of an Angel albums. Patrician Anne's career was often interrupted by Hodgkin lymphoma, which caused her death at the age of 53 in 2001.

== Discography ==
- This Is Catherine McKinnon (1964)
- Voice of an Angel (1964)
- Voice of an Angel II (1965)
- The Catherine McKinnon Christmas Album (1966)
- I'll Be Home For Christmas (1966)
- Something Old Something New (1967)
- Both Sides Now (1968)
- Everybody's Talkin' (1969)
- Catherine McKinnon with the Jimmy Dale Orchestra (1970)
- Catherine McKinnon (1980)
- Explosive (1980)
- Patrician Anne (1984)
- I'll Be Home For Christmas (1992)
- Images Of Christmas – Special Guest Denny Doherty (Attic Records Limited, 1992)
- Songs I Love – (2007)
