= David Gardner (actor) =

Canadian actor, director, and academic

- Born: May 4, 1928; Toronto, Ontario, Canada
- Died: February 8, 2020 (aged 91); Toronto, Canada
- Occupations: Actor; Director; Producer; Academic
- Years active: ca. 1945–2010

David Emmett Gardner (May 4, 1928 — February 8, 2020) was a Canadian actor from the 1940s to 2000s. Gardner began acting with CBC Radio in the mid-1940s. By the late 1950s, some of his theatrical roles were at the Royal Alexandra Theatre and the West End theatre. As an actor, Gardner received a Canadian Film Award in 1976 and a Gemini Award in 1997.

In the 1960s, Gardner was a theatre director while also working for CBC as a producer. From 1969 to 1971, Gardner was the artistic director with the Vancouver Playhouse. Throughout the 1970s, he worked as a theatre arts officer with the Canada Council before becoming an academic. Some institutions Gardner worked for included Seneca College and George Brown College. Gardner received the Earle Grey Award during the 2008 Gemini Awards.

== Early life and education ==
Gardner was born in Toronto, Ontario, Canada on May 4, 1928. While living with a sibling during his childhood, Gardner was interested in theatre and painting. After receiving a scholarship from Vincent Massey in 1956, he researched theatre the following year while in France. From the 1950s to 1980s, Gardner attended the University of Toronto.

== Career ==
=== Acting ===
While in high school, Gardner became a CBC Radio actor with Once Upon a Time during the mid-1940s.

During the late 1940s, some plays Gardner appeared in at Hart House Theatre were The Seagull and All My Sons. By the early 1950s, he starred as Mark Antony, Othello and Macbeth at Hart House.

Leading up to the late 1950s, Gardner primarily acted in North American plays while also appearing on European stages. Gardner acted in The Biggest Thief in Town and Othello at Toronto's Crest Theatre and directed a production of King Lear. Gardner also appeared at the Royal Alexandra Theatre, Stratford Festival and West End theatre in London, England.

In 1957, Gardner started his film career with Oedipus Rex. By the mid-2000s, he had appeared in over forty television films and more than twenty feature films. Additional films that Gardner starred in during this time period include Who Has Seen the Wind, Prom Night and Detroit Rock City.

Between the 1980s to 1990s, some television series that Gardner starred in were Home Fires, Street Legal and RoboCop.

=== Directing ===
In 1959, Gardner began working with CBC as a producer and continued his position until 1969. In the early 1960s, Gardner was a producer for First Person. For Festival, some plays Gardner adapted include The Apple Cart and Uncle Vanya. In the late 1960s, he was a producer and director for Quentin Durgens, M.P.

During 1960, Gardner helped create the National Theatre School of Canada as a member of the Canadian Theatre Centre.

As a theatre director, the Arctic was used for his 1961 version of King Lear. For his play, non-Indigenous people were cast as the Inuit characters. Additional plays that Gardner worked on as a director during the 1960s included The Lady's Not for Burning and The Father.

Gardner was the director for the 1967 television film The Paper People.

In 1969, the Vancouver Playhouse hired Gardner to become their artistic director. The following year, he planned to join the Canada Council. During his tenure as artistic director, Gardner and the Vancouver Playhouse Theatre Company disagreed about the cost of a proposed play by George Ryga titled Captives of a Faceless Drummer. Upon joining the Canada Council in 1971, he focused on financial grants as a theatre arts officer. His position was scheduled to end the following year.

For his academic career, Gardner worked for Seneca College in theatre during the mid-1970s. In 1979, Gardner went to George Brown College and remained there by the mid-1990s. Additional institutions Gardner worked at were the University of Toronto and York University.

== Awards and honours ==
With his role in The Insurance Man from Ingersoll, Gardner received the Best Supporting Actor award during the 1976 Canadian Film Awards. For Traders, Gardner received the Best Performance by an Actor in a Guest Role Dramatic Series award at the 11th Gemini Awards in 1997. From the Canadian Theatre Critics Association, Gardner received the Herbert Whittaker/CTCA Award for Distinguished Contribution to Canadian Theatre in 2004. As part of the 2008 Gemini Awards, Gardner was given the Earle Grey Award. In 2014, the University of Toronto began the Dr. David E. Gardner Apprentice Director Program for students who studied theatre at Hart House.

== Death and personal life ==
Gardner died in Toronto on February 8, 2020. He was previously married and had a child before his death from Alzheimer's disease.

== Filmography ==
=== Film ===
- 1977: Who Has Seen the Wind – Reverend Powelly
- 1977: Equus – Dr Bennett (uncredited)
- 1980: Prom Night – Dr. Fairchild
- 1982: If You Could See What I Hear – Mr Steffen
- 1982: Class of 1984 – Morganthau
- 1988: The Good Mother – Judge
- 1990: Beautiful Dreamers – Dr Lett
- 1997: Murder at 1600 – Speaker of the House
- 1999: Detroit Rock City – Priest

=== Television ===
ACTOR television credits
Year	Title	Role	Notes	Ref.
1970	For the Record	Bob Ramsay	Episode: "The Insurance Man from Ingersoll"	
1977	Bethune	John Bellamy	TV movie	
1984	Heartsounds	Barney Knapp	TV movie	
1987	Street Legal	Dr. Grey	Episode: "Romeo and Carol"	
1988–1994	Street Legal	Judge Howe	11 episodes. Recurring role	
1990	The World's Oldest Living Bridesmaid	Frank	TV movie	
1991	Counterstrike	Fisk	Episode: "Fall From Grace"	
1992	To Catch a Killer	Judge	TV miniseries	
1993	Trial & Error	Judge Harrison	TV movie	
1994	RoboCop	OCP Chairman	23 episodes	
1995	Kung Fu: The Legend Continues	Dr. Hamilton-Ives	1 episode	
1996	Traders	Cedric Ross	9 episodes	
2002	Monk	Minister	1 episode	
2003	Mutant X	Old Henry Blues	1 episode	
2004	Suburban Madness	Monte Harris	TV movie	
