= Spring Thaw =

Canadian theatrical revue in Toronto

Spring Thaw was an annual Canadian theatrical revue first produced in Toronto, Ontario, in 1948 by the New Play Society. Combining topical sketches, songs, solos and impersonations, the show satirized Canadian politics, culture and current events and became one of the best-known Canadian revues of the postwar period. It ran annually from 1948 to 1971 and was later revived in the 1980s.

The revue was closely associated with Dora Mavor Moore and her son Mavor Moore, and became a showcase for Canadian performers and writers including Don Harron, Jane Mallett, Eric Christmas, Alfie Scopp, Dave Broadfoot, Barbara Hamilton, Don Francks, Robert Goulet, Norman Jewison, Lou Jacobi, Alan Lund and others.

== History ==
=== Origins ===
The New Play Society was founded in 1946 by Dora Mavor Moore as a professional, non-profit theatre company devoted to developing Canadian theatre and providing work and training for Canadian actors. The first Spring Thaw was created in 1948 as a last-minute replacement for an unfinished dramatization of Hugh MacLennan's novel Two Solitudes.

The title was suggested by broadcaster Andrew Allen. According to later New Play Society program notes, the idea was that each spring thaw would uncover “what had been going on all winter,” giving the company a framework for an annual satirical review of Canadian life.

The first production was staged at the Royal Ontario Museum Theatre for three nights, from 1 to 3 April 1948. The original cast included Eric Christmas, Don Harron, Jane Mallett, Peter Mews, Mavor Moore, Alfie Scopp, Tommy Tweed and Connie Vernon, several of whom also contributed sketches. Music for the first production was by Mavor Moore and Lucio Agostini, while Lister Sinclair wrote the lyrics for the opening song, “We All Hate Toronto”.

=== Growth and popularity ===
The 1948 production was successful enough that Spring Thaw '49 ran for two weeks, and the revue soon became an annual fixture. By 1954, it had achieved what the New Play Society described as the longest run then enjoyed by an all-Canadian production in Canada; the City of Toronto gave the company a citation marking the revue's thirty-fourth performance on 18 April 1954.

Although the New Play Society produced a broad repertoire of Canadian and international plays, Spring Thaw became its most reliable commercial success. The revue helped stabilize the company financially, but also raised internal concerns that the time and resources required by the annual production might overshadow the society's broader theatrical aims. The Canadian Theatre Encyclopedia describes the revue as the New Play Society's “cash cow”.

The show also toured outside Toronto and was performed across Canada, including at the Charlottetown Festival in its first season.

=== 1960s and final years ===
In 1961, the rights to Spring Thaw were sold to Mavor Moore, who produced the next four editions himself before leasing the revue to independent producers. The revue played the Royal Alexandra Theatre annually from 1963 through 1969.

A retrospective version, The Best of Spring Thaw, toured Canada in 1964, but the annual revue struggled in the later 1960s to retain the popularity it had enjoyed in the 1950s. In 1969, producers Howard Bateman and John Uren acquired three years of production rights from Mavor Moore and attempted to update the show, commissioning musical material from figures including Gordon Lightfoot, Joni Mitchell, Oscar Peterson, Boris Brott and The Band. The same article reported that the 1969 edition had closed its Toronto run at the Royal Alexandra Theatre a week early after poor reviews.

Spring Thaw formally ended in 1971, the same year the New Play Society surrendered its charter.

=== Revivals ===
The revue was revived in 1980 as Spring Thaw: Ha Ha, which played the Royal Alexandra Theatre from 19 to 24 May 1980. The production was produced and directed by Allan F. Gordon, with a cast that included Rosemary Radcliffe, Mary Ann McDonald, Paul Brown, Brenda Bradley, Marvin Karon and Patrick Young. The Canadian Encyclopedia records revivals in 1980 and 1981, while the Canadian Theatre Encyclopedia describes a later revival period extending into the mid-1980s.

== Style and content ==
Spring Thaw was built around short topical sketches, songs, comic solos and impersonations. Its early material included sketches on contemporary subjects such as the Kinsey Reports and parodies of newsreels. The revue's Canadian focus distinguished it from many Toronto stage attractions of the period, when local theatres still relied heavily on imported British and American productions.

The show's recurring subject was the Canadian scene of the preceding winter. Many editions included topical political and cultural satire, and performers often contributed sketches or songs as well as appearing onstage. Mavor Moore and Don Harron wrote extensively for the revue during the 1950s, while Dave Broadfoot became a regular contributor from 1954 onward. Later contributors included Pierre Berton and Johnny Wayne, and musical contributors included Lucio Agostini, Bobby Gimby and Godfrey Ridout.

Critic Nathan Cohen praised the premiere, writing that the revue was “bright, unpretentious, engagingly funny”.

== Notable performers and contributors ==
Performers and contributors associated with Spring Thaw included:

- Lucio Agostini
- Pierre Berton
- Dave Broadfoot
- Pegi Brown
- Eric Christmas
- Don Francks
- Bobby Gimby
- Robert Goulet
- Barbara Hamilton
- Don Harron
- Lou Jacobi
- Norman Jewison
- Alan Lund
- Andrew Macmillan
- Jane Mallett
- Peter Mews
- Mavor Moore
- Godfrey Ridout
- Alfie Scopp
- Jean Templeton
- Tommy Tweed
- Connie Vernon
- Johnny Wayne

== Legacy ==
Spring Thaw is remembered as one of the principal theatrical successes of the New Play Society and as an important showcase for Canadian performers and writers in the period before the expansion of subsidized regional theatre in Canada. The University of Toronto's New Play Society records state that the revue gave many Canadian artists national recognition, particularly through its later touring productions. TAPA, in its profile of Dora Mavor Moore, identifies the annual revue as one of the productions for which the New Play Society is best remembered.
