= Celtic Instrumentals =

Studio album by Rawlins Cross
- Released: April 29, 1997 (Canada)
- Genre: Folk
- Length: —
- Label: Warner Music

Rawlins Cross chronology
Living River (1996)	Celtic Instrumentals (1997)	Make it on Time (1998)

Celtic Instrumentals is a collection of Rawlins Cross' favourite instrumental tracks from their previous CDs plus some newly recorded tunes. It was released in 1997 by Warner Music.

== Track listing ==
1. "MacPherson's Lament"
2. "Little Sara"/"Jessie's Jig"
3. "O'Neil's March"/"The Haughs of Cromdale"
4. "Wedding Gift"
5. "Mac's Fancy"/"Give Me a Drink of Water"
6. "Israel Got a Rabbit"
7. "Memory Waltz"
8. "Back Down Home Medley"
9. "Rollicking Skipper B."/'The Shimmy"
10. "Little Beggarman"
11. "Mairi Nighean Alasdair"
