= Living River =

Studio album by Rawlins Cross
- Released: March 19, 1996 (Canada)
- Studio: Inception Sound Studios, Toronto, Ontario, Canada
- Genre: Folk
- Producer: Rawlins Cross and Chad Irschick

Rawlins Cross chronology
Reel 'N' Roll (1993)	Living River (1996)	Celtic Instrumentals (1997)

Professional ratings
Review scores
Source	Rating
AllMusic	3/5 stars

Living River is a 1996 folk album by Rawlins Cross. The cover art is "L'anse des Belliveau" (1996). This is a mixed-medium work by François Gaudet, an Acadian artist from Nova Scotia.

== Track listing ==
1. "Forever Dancing" – 3:07
2. "Matter of the Heart" – 5:07
3. "Morning After" – 3:28
4. "Wild Rose" – 2:31
5. "When My Ship Comes In" – 4:34
6. "Sad Story..." – 3:12
7. "Open Road" – 3:19
8. "Little Sara/Jessie's Jig" – 2:57
9. "Little of Your Lovin (Goes a Long Long Way)" – 2:25
10. "Through It All" – 3:43
11. "Long Way Home" – 3:46
12. "Baby-Oh" – 3:45
13. "Mairi Nighean Alasdair" – 3:46
