= Anne of Green Gables (1956 film) =

1956 television film by Don Harron

- Based on: Anne of Green Gables by Lucy Maud Montgomery
- Written by: Lucy Maud Montgomery
- Screenplay by: James Costigan; Donald Harron
- Directed by: Donald Harron
- Starring: Toby Tarnow; Nonnie Griffin; Sharon Acker
- Music by: Norman Campbell
- Country of origin: Canada
- Original language: English

Production
- Producer: Norman Campbell
- Running time: 90 minutes

Original release
- Network: CBC Television
- Release: 4 March 1956

Anne of Green Gables is a Canadian television film directed by Don Harron that aired on 4 March 1956. The film was based upon the 1908 novel, Anne of Green Gables by Lucy Maud Montgomery.

The movie was produced for CBC Television, which also commissioned the more famous remake 1985 film adaptation. The filming and production took place in Toronto, ON.

The film depicts the story of a preteen orphan girl, Anne Shirley, adopted in the small-town of Avonlea, Prince Edward Island, whose optimistic mindset defies standard ladylike conduct and drives her to overcome any obstacle life throws at her.

== Cast ==
- Toby Tarnow as Anne Shirley
- William Cole as Gilbert Blythe
- Margot Christie as Marilla Cuthbert
- John Drainie as Matthew Cuthbert
- Nonnie Griffin as Diana Barry
- Sharon Acker as Mrs. Stacey
- Pegi Brown as Mrs. Bell
- Eric House as Mr. Phillips

== Background ==
The story of the young red-headed girl with swift braids and an active imagination has long warmed the hearts of theatregoers. The 1956 adaptation was the first and original airing of Anne of Green Gables for national screening on CBC Television. While the novel was written by L. M. Montgomery, writers Don Harron, Norman and Elaine Campbell, and Mavor Moore extended the musical interpretation of the story in this film. Harron was asked to create the story alongside Montgomery for the short 90-minute program.

== Production ==
The 90-minute film was produced and distributed by the CBC Folio (1955-1960), airing original drama series and adaptations, including Shakespeare's Macbeth and The Black Bonspiel of Wullie MacCrimmon. It was an early version of Campbell and Harron's Anne of Green Gables the Musical which would premiere in 1965 at Charlottetown's Confederation Centre of the Arts. William Cole's interpretation as Gilbert Blythe was intended to be portrayed as Elvis Presley when he sings, "Wonderin'/ All at once I'm wonderin". Campbell's music was viewed as an inspiration to the other films later on. Although it is intended to be set in Prince Edward Island, it was filmed in Toronto, Ontario. Running time is approximately an hour and a half and the kinescope presented is in black and white. It was released in Canada on March 4, 1956.

== Plot ==
Set in the small-town of Avonlea, Prince Edward Island, Canada, elderly siblings Matthew and Marilla Cuthbert agree to adopt an orphan boy to help tackle chores around their family farm. When Matthew arrives at the train station to pick up the boy, he is surprised to confront an 11-year-old orphan girl named Anne Shirley. Anne's enthusiastic personality wins over Matthew's heart who reveals to Marilla he still wants to adopt her even though the circumstances aren't ideal. While Marilla is not keen on the idea, after a period of time, she agrees to keep Anne.

Despite growing up alone as an orphan, Anne finds the simple joys that life has to offer. She has a wild imagination and kind spirit, while her manners lack standard social acceptance. Due to a subpar education, she unintentionally defies proper and polite manners. She makes many mistakes to be expected by an 11-year-old girl.

Anne meets a smart young boy, Gilbert Blythe, at their local school who she builds a rivalry against when he calls her names and makes fun of her natural red hair– a sensitive topic for Anne. A teacher recognizes Anne's talents and intelligence quickly and encourages her to join a school club (designed for exceptional students) to prepare for an entrance exam at the prestigious university, Queen's Academy. She soon earns a scholarship which would pay her four years through school. Anne's foster father Matthew dies of a heart attack while her foster mother Marilla is said to go blind. She then lets go of her dream of a wealthy education and stays in Avonlea to care for her beloved foster mother. Gilbert overhears the news and decides to withdraw from his teaching career at Avonlea school so that Anne can take his position and be closer to her family. This random act of kindness creates a lasting friendship for Anne and Gilbert. Although Anne's dreams may seem as though lost, Anne believes there is much to look forward to in this beautiful thing called life.

== Legacy of Anne (novels preceding the first musical film) ==
Prince Edward Island is recognized as the home of character, Anne Shirley. David Mackenzie, CEO of the Confederation Centre for the Arts in Charlottetown, where the monumental Anne of Green Gables exhibit is held, says the island has claimed Anne. On June 20, 1908, Lucy Maud Montgomery brought her first copy of the Anne of Green Gables novel through the island postmarked for Boston. But the island and her had a relationship, one where Anne could exist. Later on, about a century later, Lucy Montgomery became a progressive idol for women in the fictional girl she had written. The idea was to do things women didn't typically do in rural Canada, especially in the beginning of the 20th century.

The book had novels to follow the original including Anne of Avonlea that was published in 1909, Kilmeny of the Orchard in 1910, The Story Girl in 1911, The Chronicles of Avonlea in 1912, The Golden Road in 1913, Anne of the Island in 1915, The Watchman and other Poems in 1916, Anne's House of Dreams and The Alpine Path: The Story of My Career in 1917, and Rainbow Valley in 1919. Tourists began visiting the island of Cavendish as early as 1909 and the momentum's attention has only flourished. The Anne Store in Charlottetown is designed as a village to appear as though described in the book.

The first film as a musical adaptation and addition to the novel begins with the 1956 screening on CBC television. This then prompted the later and more popular Anne of Green Gables (1985 film) mini-series.
