= Anne of Green Gables: The Musical =

Musical

Anne of Green Gables
- The Musical
- Music: Norman Campbell
- Lyrics: Don Harron; Norman Campbell; Elaine Campbell; Mavor Moore
- Book: Don Harron
- Basis: Lucy Maud Montgomery's novel Anne of Green Gables
- Productions: 1965 Charlottetown Festival annually until 2019; biennially from 2022; 1969 London; 1971 Off-Broadway; 2018 Adelaide

Anne Of Green Gables – The Musical is a musical based on the 1908 novel Anne of Green Gables by Lucy Maud Montgomery. The book was written by Don Harron exclusively, the music by Norman Campbell and the lyrics in a joint venture by Harron, Norman Campbell, Elaine Campbell and Mavor Moore. It has been Canada's longest-running musical, performed annually from its opening in 1965 until 2019, with the planned 2020 and 2021 productions cancelled due to the COVID-19 pandemic. In March 2014, it was officially recognised as the longest running annual musical theatre production in the world by Guinness World Records.

Anne returned to the Charlottetown Festival stage for the 2022 season, however organisers announced late in the year that the show would be produced only in alternating years from then on.

== Productions and background ==
=== Background ===
In 1956, Don Harron, Norman Campbell, and Elaine Campbell adapted Anne of Green Gables into a like-named, live musical special for the Canadian Broadcasting Corporation. In 1958, a second production of their musical was broadcast.

Mavor Moore, the founding artistic director of Charlottetown's Confederation Centre of the Arts, used the title song from that special in the inaugural variety performance in 1964, which was attended by Queen Elizabeth II. Following the concert, the Queen, declaring Anne of Green Gables as one of her favourite books, enquired about the rest of the show, sparking the collaboration of Don Harron, Norman Campbell, and Elaine Campbell with Moore in adapting the beloved novel into a stage musical. It premiered in 1965 at the Charlottetown Festival.

=== Productions ===
The musical was originally directed and choreographed by Alan Lund. It was performed every summer beginning in 1965, headlining the Charlottetown Festival at the Confederation Centre of the Arts, Prince Edward Island, making this Canada's longest-running mainstage musical. Just before its 50th season, in 2014, it was announced that this production of Anne of Green Gables: The Musical had been named by Guinness World Records as the "longest-running annual musical theatre production" in the world. Its 2500th performance was given on August 23, 2017. A song from the musical was part of the feature performance at the opening of the Confederation Centre of the Arts on October 6, 1964, playing to Her Majesty Queen Elizabeth II and His Royal Highness The Duke of Edinburgh as well as Prime Minister Lester B. Pearson. The production was not performed in 2020 as the Charlottetown Festival was cancelled due to the COVID-19 pandemic, and was excluded from the Charlottetown Festival lineup for 2021 as public health restrictions in effect at the time made producing the show impossible. The production returned in 2022, and it was then announced that the show would be performed only in alternating years from then on.

The musical has also toured outside of Prince Edward Island. Its first tour was in 1967, visiting the major Canadian cities. In 1970 the musical represented Canada at the World's Fair in Osaka, Japan. The second national tour took place in 1974, at 34 venues; the third national tour was in 1982 with 9 stops. In 1969 it opened in London's West End and won that year's Drama Critics Award for Best New Musical of that year with Canadian Barbara Hamilton playing Marilla. It played off-Broadway in New York from December 21, 1971, to January 2, 1972, at the New York City Center. During the 1980s and 1990s the musical was produced in Japan by Gekidan Shiki.

An independent production opened on April 16, 1969, at the New Theatre, London, running for nine months and starring Polly James as Anne.

In 1991, The Charlottetown Festival toured the musical to Japan on a 2-month, 8 city tour. The tour was organized by director Walter Learning, and starred Leisa Way as "Anne", Denise Ferguson as "Marilla" and David Hughes as "Matthew".

In May 2009, Dancap Productions brought the original Charlottetown Festival production starring Amy Wallis to Toronto for a limited run at the Elgin Theatre.

In May 2013, Theatre Calgary produced a new production with new arrangements and orchestrations by Dave Pierce.

In December 2019, EK Productions staged an immersive version in Adelaide starring Issy Darwent and directed by Benjamin Maio Mackay.

== Musical numbers ==
The musical numbers vary with the production, but this is the list as it appears on the cast recording.

Act One

- Overture/Great Workers For the Cause/Where is Matthew Going? – Full Company
- Gee I'm Glad I'm No One Else But Me – Anne Shirley and Matthew Cuthbert
- We Clearly Requested a Boy – Marilla Cuthbert, Anne Shirley and Matthew Cuthbert
- The Facts – Anne Shirley, Mrs Spencer, Marilla Cuthbert and Mrs Blewett
- Humble Pie – Matthew Cuthbert and Anne Shirley
- Apology – Anne Shirley
- Back to School – Mr Phillips and Students
- Wondrin' – Gilbert Blythe
- Did you Hear? – Josie Pye, Mrs Pye, Lucilla, Mrs Barry, Rachel Lynde and Marilla Cuthbert
- Ice Cream – Diana Barry, Anne Shirley and Ensemble

Act Two

- Summer – The Students
- Kindred Spirits – Anne Shirley & Diana Barry
- Open The Window – Miss Stacy and the Students
- Kindred Spirits (reprise) - Diana Barry
- Open The Window (reprise) - Miss Stacy
- I'll Show Him – Anne Shirley and Gilbert Blythe
- General Store – Lucilla, Matthew and the Townspeople
- If It Hadn't Been For Me – Full Company
- Anne of Green Gables – Matthew Cuthbert
- The Words (reprise) – Marilla Cuthbert
- Wondrin' (reprise) – Gilbert Blythe and Anne Shirley

For the showings in the year 2008 in Charlottetown, commemorating the 100th "ANNE"iversary, a portrayal of L.M. Montgomery and the students sang a reprise of "Anne of Green Gables" in the beginning, following a bit of history of how Montgomery arrived at the plot of "Anne".

School productions typically either cut out a few tracks (Humble Pie, I'll Show Him, to name a couple) or change the key to better suit some of the more inexperienced student vocalists' ranges, as well as keep the plot fast-paced.

== Actors in the role of Anne ==
=== Charlottetown Festival ===
- Jamie Ray (1965–67)
- Gracie Finley (1968–74, 1984–85)
- Malorie-Ann Spiller (1975–78)
- Susan Cuthbert (1979–80)
- Thea MacNeil (1981–83)
- Tracey Moore (1986)
- Leisa Way (1987–90, 1993)
- Glynis Ranney (1991–92)
- Tracy Michailidis (1994–96)
- Samantha Winstanley (1997)
- Sharmaine Ryan (1998–99)
- Chilina Kennedy (2000–01)
- Jennifer Toulmin (2002–05, 2010) with Lisa Messina as an alternate in 2003 and Allyson Pratt as an alternate in 2010
- Amy Wallis (2006–09)
- Tess Benger (2011–12)
- Katie Kerr (2013–14)
- Jessica Gallant (2015–16)
- AJ Bridel (2017–2018)
- Emma Rudy (2019), was scheduled to perform the role in 2020
- Kelsey Verzotti (2022, 2024)
- Berkley Silverman (2026)

== Film adaptation ==
In 2013, Canadian indie film producers The Film Farm and Side Road Media announced plans to turn the long-running musical into a feature film, written by actor and playwright Kristen Thomson. The film was cancelled, due to the Anne with an E CBC/Netflix television series.

== Disambiguation ==
Anne of Green Gables: A New Musical, a new adaptation of the story with original songs by Matt Vinson and Matte O'Brien, premiered at Finger Lakes Music Theatre Festival in 2018 before releasing a concept recording in November 2020. A follow-up production is set for Goodspeed Opera House in 2022.
