= Toby Tarnow =

Canadian actress

- Born: June 15, 1937 (age 88); Gravelbourg, Saskatchewan, Canada
- Occupation: actor
- Known for: Anne Shirley in Anne of Green Gables
- Spouse(s): Barry Joel Little (m. 1956; div. ?); Earl Hugh Berger (m. 1964; div. ?); Richard Bryan Kalin (m. 1990; d. 2016)
- Children: 2

Toby Tarnow (born June 15, 1937) is a Canadian actress. She was the first actress to portray the popular Anne Shirley of Anne of Green Gables in Canadian radio then in Canadian television in a 1956 television movie.

== Career ==
Tarnow began her career in the 1950s as a child actress on Canadian television. Her most popular work included the part of Princess Summerfall Winterspring on the Canadian version of the Howdy Doody Show on CBC television and a regular on the children's show, Mr. Dressup. In 1956, she was in the Anne of Green Gables TV movie.

As an adult, Tarnow progressed to roles in live theatre. She starred as "The Girl" in The Seven Year Itch at Toronto's Crest Theatre and played Cordelia in King Lear. In 1972, she starred in Forever Yours, Mary Lou at Toronto's Tarragon Theatre, garnering rave reviews.

She continued on television as a regular panelist on the Canadian To Tell the Truth, a regular role in CBC'S forensic police drama The Collaborators (1973–74), a continuing character on the Canadian soap opera Moment of Truth, and a continuing role in the miniseries Amerika and a children's television show, Nursery School Time with Miss Toby and Hoppy.

In film, she appeared in Nobody Waved Goodbye in 1965. In 1974, she was the rabbi's wife in Only God Knows.

== Recognition ==
In 1954, at the second annual banquet of the Association of Canadian Radio and Television Artists, Tarnow received the Maurice M. Rosenfeld Award as the "outstanding newcomer to radio", presented to her by the previous year's recipient, Kate Reid. In 2012, Toby was awarded the Children's and Youth Theatre Award by the New Hampshire Theatre Awards.

== Personal life ==
On June 2, 1956, Tarnow married Dr. Barry Joel Little, with whom she had one child, a daughter. In April 1964, she married Globe and Mail reporter Earl Hugh Berger. They, too, had one child, a son. Until his death in 2016, Tarnow was married to Richard Bryan Kalin.

In August 1989, she moved to New Hampshire.

== Performances ==
=== Film ===
| Year | Title | Role | Notes |
|---|---|---|---|
| 1964 | Nobody Waved Good-bye | Sister | |
| 1974 | Only God Knows | Frances Sherman | |
| 1983 | Utilities | Gilda | |

=== Television ===
| Year | Title | Role | Notes |
|---|---|---|---|
| 1955–1958 | On Camera | Susan / Sheila | 4 episodes |
| 1956 | Anne of Green Gables | Anne Shirley | Television film |
| 1957–1960 | Encounter | Doreen / Polly / Nancy | 6 episodes |
| 1959 | Startime | Nora | Episode: "A Clearing in the Woods" |
| 1959 | Hudson's Bay | Little Dove | 2 episodes |
| 1960 | R.C.M.P. | Anna | Episode: "Violence at the Wedding" |
| 1961–1966 | Festival | Miriam / Sophie / Tansy | 3 episodes |
| 1964 | Moment of Truth | Carol Williams | Television film |
| 1965 | Theatre 625 | Lilith | Episode: "David, Chapter 2" |
| 1966 | Seaway | Anne Ballantyre | Episode: "Dead Reckoning" |
| 1972 | The Whiteoaks of Jalna | Ruth | Episode #1.1 |
| 1972 | Dr. Simon Locke | Andrea | Episode: "The Perfect Specimen" |
| 1974 | The Collaborators | Liz Roman | 4 episodes |
| 1976 | Teleplay | Lana | Episode: "The Italian Machine" |
| 1980 | King of Kensington | Janice | Episode: "Green-Eyed Monster" |
| 1982 | Till Death Do Us Part | Dr. Honora Freed | Television film |
| 1985 | Star Wars: Droids | Voice | 4 episodes |
| 1986 | The Edison Twins | Dr. Karla Jenson | Episode: "Strictly for the Birds" |
| 1987 | Amerika | Helen | 2 episodes |

=== Theatre ===
| Year | Title | Role | Venue | Notes |
|---|---|---|---|---|
| 1960 | King Lear | Cordelia | Crest Theatre, Toronto | |
| 1963 | The Seven Year Itch | The Girl | Crest Theatre, Toronto | |
| 1972 | Forever Yours, Mary Lou | | Tarragon Theatre, Toronto | |
