= Rawlins Cross =

Canadian Celtic band

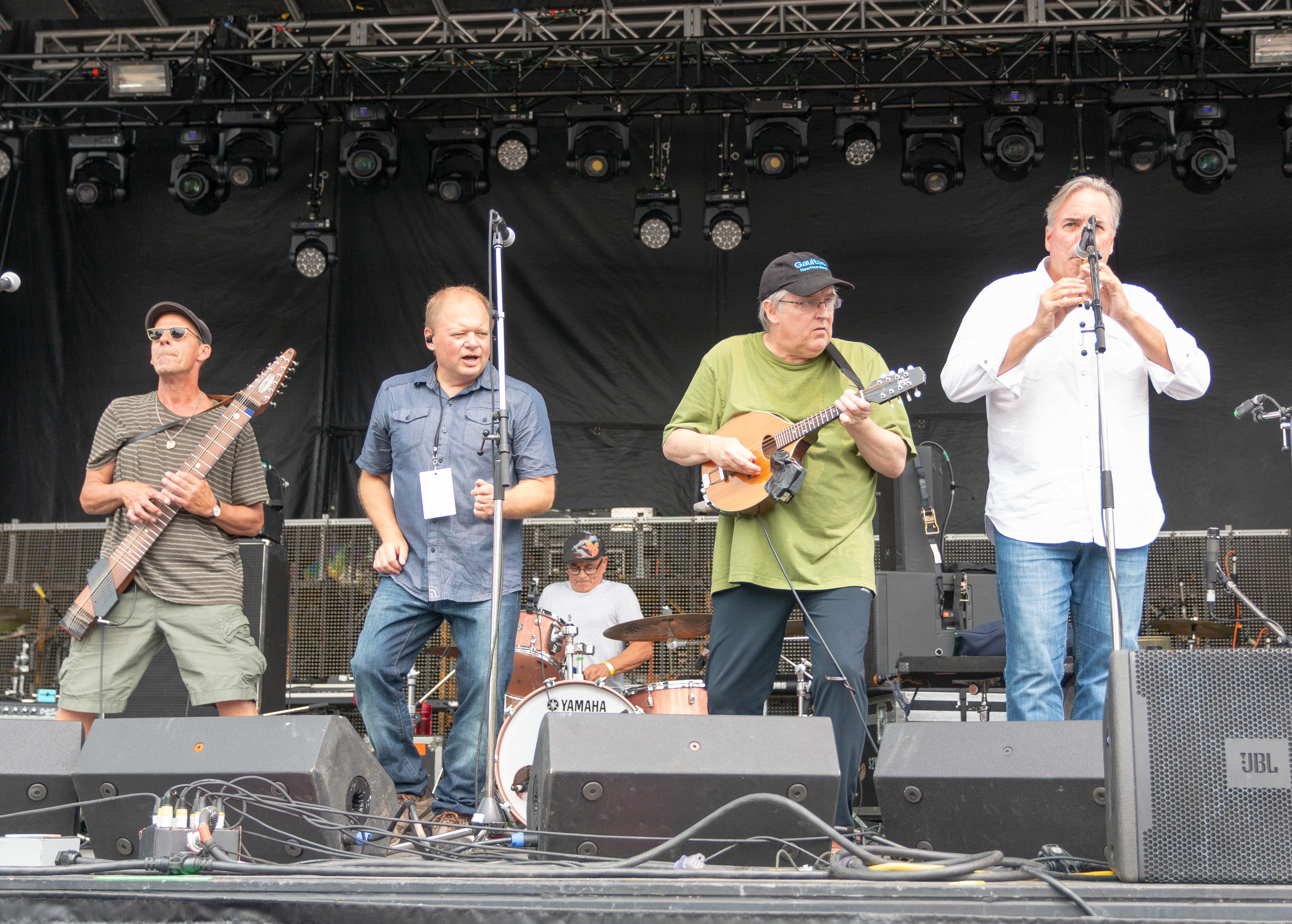
- Rawlins Cross performing at Riverfest Elora in 2018. From left: Brian Bourne (Chapman Stick), Joey Kitson (vocals), Howie Southwood (in back, on drums), Dave Panting (mandolin), Ian McKinnon (tin whistle). Not pictured: Geoff Panting

Background information
- Origin: St. John's, Newfoundland, Canada
- Genres: Celtic rock
- Years active: 1988–2001; 2008–present
- Labels: Ground Swell; Warner Music Canada
- Members: Joey Kitson; Dave Panting; Geoff Panting; Ian McKinnon; Brian Bourne; Howie Southwood
- Past members: Pamela Paton; Lorne Taylor; Derek Pelley; Tom Roach
- Website: www.rawlinscross.com

Rawlins Cross is a Celtic band that formed in 1988 in Atlantic Canada. With members from Newfoundland, Nova Scotia, Prince Edward Island, and Ontario, the band took its name from an intersection in St. John's, Newfoundland.

== Formation and early history ==
Rawlins Cross was formed in St. John's in the late 1980s by songwriting brothers Dave Panting (guitar and mandolin), Geoff Panting (keyboards and accordion), and Ian McKinnon (highland pipes and tin whistle). They then added drummer Pamela Paton and bassist Lorne Taylor to the band.

The band started in the East Coast recording scene in late 1989 with its first independently released recording, A Turn of the Wheel; a video for the single "Colleen" was released the same year. After its release, "Colleen" had a top ten radio slot on Toronto's CFNY station. In 1991, Lorne Taylor left the band, with Derek Pelley briefly replacing Taylor on bass. Prior to the recording of their sophomore album, Crossing The Border, Pamela Paton left in late 1991, to be replaced by Tom Roach. Bassist Derek Pelley left in early 1992, and was replaced by Brian Bourne.

== Popularity and mainstream success ==
In 1992, the band released Crossing The Border, which further developed the fusion of highland bagpipes, mandolin and accordion with a rhythm section. A year later, after Rawlins Cross brought in drummer Howie Southwood, the band recorded Reel 'n' Roll, which would be its best-selling album and launch a national radio hit with the title track. Prior to the recording of Reel 'n' Roll, Prince Edward Island singer, Joey Kitson, joined the band as the new lead singer. Prior to Kitson joining the band, guitarist Dave Panting sang lead vocals for the band on the albums, A Turn of the Wheel and Crossing The Border.

Rawlins Cross released Living River in 1996, which garnered two Juno Award nominations. The band toured Canada three times that year and signed a licensing deal for its music in Europe.

Rawlins Cross performed live on the nationally televised East Coast Music Awards and performed at the ninth annual St. Patrick's Day Celebration Festival in Germany and also represented Canada at the Expo Cumbre de las Americas in Santiago, Chile.

Two more albums followed: Celtic Instrumentals in 1997, a retrospective collection, and the 1998 studio album Make It On Time, which would prove to be the band's last album for more than a decade.

Following a six-year hiatus, Rawlins Cross reunited in the fall of 2008 and released its seventh recording, Anthology. In November 2010, they released their eighth album, Heart Head Hands. Their next recording, Rock Steady, was recorded at Codapop Studios (in Halifax, Nova Scotia) and released in December 2017 with the single, "Hold You Tonight".

== Style ==
Rawlins Cross mixed Scottish, Irish, Celtic, and rock 'n' roll elements. Their style ranged from Celtic-instrumental to blues to folk, always with a strong rhythmic feeling, and combined contemporary song stylings with traditional instrumentation and story elements. The principal songwriters were brothers Dave and Geoff Panting.

After vocalist Joey Kitson joined the band in 1993, a number of songs on the first two CDs, including "Turn Of the Wheel", "MacPherson's Lament", "Colleen", and "Open Road" were recorded again with Kitson singing lead, and released on subsequent recordings.

== Band members ==
=== Current band members ===
- Joey Kitson — lead vocals, harmonica (1993–present)
- Dave Panting — mandolin, guitar, banjo, harmonica, bouzouki, background vocals, songwriting (1988–present), lead vocals (1988–1993)
- Geoff Panting — accordion, keyboards, background vocals, songwriting (1988–present)
- Ian McKinnon — bagpipes, tin whistle, bodhran, trumpet, percussion, jaw harp (1988–present)
- Brian Bourne — Chapman Stick, bass, background vocals (1992–present)
- Howie Southwood — drums (1993–present)

=== Former band members ===
- Pamela Paton — drums (1988–1991)
- Lorne Taylor —bass (1988–1991)
- Derek Pelley — bass (1991–1992)
- Tom Roach — drums (1991–1993)

== Discography ==
=== Albums ===
Year	Album
1989	A Turn of the Wheel
1992	Crossing the Border
1993	Reel 'N' Roll
1996	Living River
1997	Celtic Instrumentals
1998	Make It on Time
2008	Anthology
2010	Heart-Head-Hands
2017	Rock Steady
2019	Flying Colours
2022	Sunrise

=== Singles ===
Year	Single	Chart Positions		Album
Year	Single	CAN AC	CAN	Album
1994	"Reel 'N' Roll"			Reel 'N' Roll
1994	"Long Night"	60		Reel 'N' Roll
1996	"When My Ship Comes In"			Living River
1996	"The Long Way Home"	49	58	Living River
1998	"You Will Always Be My Love"			Make It on Time
1998	"Where Would I Be"	56		Make It on Time

== Awards and nominations ==
- 1997 Juno Awards
  - Nominations
    - Best Roots/Traditional Album - Living River
    - Best Album Design - Living River
- 1999 East Coast Music Awards
  - Winner
    - Best Roots/Traditional
  - Nominations
    - Entertainer of the Year
    - Best Group of the Year
