= A Turn of the Wheel =

Studio album by Rawlins Cross
- Released: January 15, 1989
- Studios: CBC Studio F, St. John's Newfoundland
- Genre: Folk
- Label: Ground Swell
- Producer: Glen Tilley

Rawlins Cross chronology
| A Turn of the Wheel (1989) | Crossing the Border (1992) |

A Turn of the Wheel is Rawlins Cross' debut album, released in 1989 on the Ground Swell label.

== Track listing ==
All songs are traditional arrangements, unless otherwise noted.

1. "Wild Rose" (Dave Panting) - 3:29
2. "Farmer's Daughter/ High Reel" - 2:15
3. "A Turn of the Wheel" (Geoff Panting) - 3:36
4. "Mountainside" (D. Panting) - 2:40
5. "MacPherson's Lament" - 3:30
6. "Colleen" (D. Panting) - 4:04
7. "Mac's Fancy/ Give Me a Drink of Water" - 2:55
8. "Shaken Up" (G. Panting) - 2:56
9. "Ghost of Love" (D. Panting) - 3:10
10. "Sleepy Maggie/ Gravel Walk/ Little Beggarman" - 2:56

== Personnel ==
Rawlins Cross

- Dave Panting - guitar, vocals
- Ian McKinnon - bagpipes, trumpet, tin whistle, vocals
- Geoff Panting - keyboards, vocals
- Lorne Taylor - bass
- Pamela Paton - drums

Studio Musicians

- Kathy Phippard - backing vocals
- Glenn Tilley - backing vocals
- Sean Panting - backing vocals

Production

- Glen Tilley - producer
- Terry Windsor - engineer
- Deryk Wenaus - typography
- Manfred Buchheit - photography
