= Bruce Swerdfager =

Canadian actor

- Born: John Bruce Swerdfager; March 12, 1928; Ottawa, Ontario, Canada
- Died: September 4, 2007 (aged 79); Stratford, Ontario, Canada
- Resting place: Avondale Cemetery, Stratford
- Occupations: Actor, theatre manager
- Years active: 1951–1990
- Spouse: Mary Swerdfager
- Children: Ann Swerdfager, John, Kathy and Paul Robertson

Bruce Swerdfager (12 March 1928 – 4 September 2007) was a Canadian actor and theatre manager.

== Career ==
Swerdfager was born in Ottawa, Ontario. At age 15, Swerdfager began acting on radio at CKCO and CFRA in Ottawa. He was an active member of the Ottawa Little Theatre before being named Best Supporting Actor at the Dominion Drama Festival in 1951. While working as a typewriter salesman, he auditioned for Tyrone Guthrie and was selected as a member of the Stratford Festival company. In later life he said; ″Who would have guessed the Stratford Festival would outlast the typewriter?″ With William Hutt he received the first Guthrie Award and used the funds to travel to The United Kingdom to study theatre in 1954–55. On his return to Stratford he rose through the ranks becoming company manager, theatre and company manager, comptroller and ultimately general manager.

On stage he was a founding member of the Stratford Shakespearean Festival of Canada and as general manager of the festival from 1972 until 1976 he took it from a million-dollar deficit to a half-million-dollar surplus. He also served as company manager of the Canadian Players. His survey of all Canadian theatres for the Canada Council inspired national theater touring across the country. He later ran the Dallas Theater Center and the St. Lawrence Centre for the Arts. He returned to the Stratford Festival as an actor in 1986 playing in The Boys from Syracuse and A Winter's Tale.

Swerdfager died of complications from diabetes in 2007 in Stratford, Ontario. On his death, the Honourable Josée Verner Minister of Canadian Heritage, said; “The Canadian theatre community has lost a valuable member with the death of Bruce Swerdfager. An original member of the Stratford Festival acting company, Swerdfager also served the Festival as general manager and twice oversaw reconstruction of its Avon Theatre. A recipient of the Stratford Festival’s Tyrone Guthrie Award, this man of arts and passion made lasting contributions to theatre in Canada, which included producing an assessment of theatre facilities across the country. His dedication to theatre in Canada and to his colleagues in the field was further demonstrated by his work to improve wages and working conditions for actors and stage managers. He will long be remembered as an influential figure in the world of Canadian theatre.” His daughter, Ann Swerdfager, is the head of public relations for the Stratford Festival.

== Honours ==
- Tyrone Guthrie Award in 1954
- Queen Elizabeth II Silver Jubilee Medal in 1977
