= Sharon Acker =

Canadian actress and model (1935–2023)

- Acker in 1976
- Born: Sharon Eileen Acker; April 2, 1935; Toronto, Ontario, Canada
- Died: March 16, 2023 (aged 87); Toronto, Ontario, Canada
- Years active: 1956–1992
- Spouses: Austin Ronald MacDonald (m. 1956; div. 19??) Peter John Elkington (m. 1973; died 2001)
- Children: 2

Sharon Eileen Acker (April 2, 1935 – March 16, 2023) was a Canadian film, stage, and television actress and model. She appeared mostly on television in Canada and the United States from 1956 to 1992. She played Della Street, Perry Mason's loyal secretary, in The New Perry Mason opposite Monte Markham. Her film roles include Lucky Jim, Point Blank and Don't Let the Angels Fall.

== Biography ==
Acker was born in Toronto, Ontario. She began her professional acting career with a television appearance in a made-for-television movie of Anne of Green Gables in 1956. She joined the Stratford Theatre cast, and traveled with the troupe to England, where she stayed to seek acting work. She made her film debut there in Lucky Jim (1957). Turning down a long-term contract with the producers of Lucky Jim, Acker returned to Canada in 1957 with her husband to raise a family.

Acker returned to acting in Canadian television productions. She appeared in a 1961 Canadian Broadcasting Corporation (CBC) production of Macbeth with Sean Connery, directed by Paul Almond. During the 1960s, she also modeled, appearing in print advertisements. She and Angie Dickinson were featured modeling "moll style" clothing in the August 25, 1967, issue of Life.

Her first American film appearance was in the John Boorman crime film Point Blank (1967) starring Lee Marvin and John Vernon. From that point, Acker appeared in film and television roles in Canada and the United States, including The Wild Wild West (The Night of the Sedgewick Curse, 1968). One year later, she guest-starred in the Star Trek episode "The Mark of Gideon" as Odona, a young woman who chooses to sacrifice herself by introducing disease to her overpopulated planet. In 1976–77 she portrayed Helen Walling in the prime-time drama Executive Suite. During this period, Acker also made a guest appearance on episode five of the second season of The Love Boat, which initially aired on October 20, 1978. She also appeared in two episodes of The Rockford Files in 1978 and 1979. She made her last feature film appearance in 1981 and her last television appearance in 1992.

== Personal life and death ==
Acker married twice. In 1956, in London, she wed fellow Canadian Austin Ronald MacDonald. They later divorced, although the year of their separation is unverified. Acker then married Peter John Elkington, a filmmaker, in 1973 in Los Angeles, California. The couple remained together for 28 years, until Elkington's death in 2001. She had two daughters from her first marriage and two stepdaughters from Elkington's previous marriage.

Acker died at a retirement home in Toronto, Canada, on March 16, 2023, at the age of 87.

== Filmography ==
=== Films ===
Year	Title	Role	Notes
1957	Lucky Jim	Christine Callaghan	
1967	Point Blank	Lynne Walker	
1969	Waiting for Caroline	Emily	
1969	The First Time	Pamela Williams	
1969	Don't Let the Angels Fall	Barbara	
1970	The Act of the Heart	Adele	
1981	Happy Birthday to Me	Estelle Wainwright	
1981	Threshold	Tilla Vrain	

=== Television ===
Year	Title	Role	Notes
1956	Anne of Green Gables	Mrs. Stacey	TV movie
1956	ITV Television Playhouse	Ruth	Episode: "The Man"
1959	The Unforeseen	Ellen Thomas	Episode: "Shelter for the Night"
1961	Macbeth	Lady Macduff	TV movie
1966	Wojeck	Tony Marlowe	2 episodes
1968	The Wild Wild West	Lavinia Sedgewick	Episode: "The Night of the Sedgewick Curse"
1968–1969	It Takes a Thief	Dr. Edwina Hopkins	3 episodes
1969	Star Trek	Odona	Episode: "The Mark of Gideon"
1969	Lancer	Tiffany Mumford	Episode: "The Gifts"
1969	Get Smart	Dr. Simon (uncredited)	Episode: "I Shot 86 Today"
1970	A Clear and Present Danger	Erin Stowe	TV movie
1970–1971	The Bold Ones: The Senator	Ellen Stowe	4 episodes
1970–1972	Mission: Impossible	Annette/Connie Hastings	2 episodes
1971	Alias Smith and Jones	Rachel Carlson	Episode: "The 5 Victim"
1971	Gunsmoke	Tereese Farrell	Episode: "Trafton"
1971	The F.B.I.	Kate Waller	Episode: "The Watch-Dog"
1971	Cade's County	Roseann Claybourne	Episode: "Gray Wolf"
1971	Love, American Style	Gloria	1 episode
1971–1973	Marcus Welby, M.D.	Nancy Mason, Margaret Loring	2 episodes
1971-1975	Cannon	Various	3 episodes
1972	The Mod Squad	Agnes Carter	Episode: "Big George"
1972	McMillan & Wife	Evie Kendall	Episode: "Night of the Wizard"
1972	Hec Ramsey	Nora Muldoon	2 episodes
1973	The Stranger	Dr. Bettina Cooke	TV movie
1973	The Delphi Bureau	Sheila	Episode: "The Terror Broker Project"
1973–1974	The New Perry Mason	Della Street	
1973–1975	Barnaby Jones	Various	3 episodes
1974	The Hanged Man	Carrie Gault	TV movie
1974	Harry O	Andrea Tannehill	Episode: "The Admiral's Lady"
1971–1975	Cannon	Laura Venner, Jill, Mrs. Dude	3 episodes
1975–1977	The Streets of San Francisco	Ethel Finn, Eleanor Jessup	2 episodes
1976	Our Man Flint: Dead on Target	Sandra Carter	TV movie
1976-1977	Executive Suite	Helen Walling	
1977	The Hostage Heart	Martha Lake	TV movie
1978	The Love Boat	Evelyn	Segment: "Mike and Ike"
1978–1979	The Rockford Files	Edie Nevitt/Adrianna Danielli	2 episodes
1978–1981	Quincy, M.E.	Various	3 episodes
1979	Police Story	Barbara Price	Episode: "A Cry for Justice"
1979-1980	Matt and Jenny	Samantha Shelborne	2 episodes
1980	Stone	Karen Halloran	Episode: "Deep Sleeper"
1980	Galactica 1980	Anne	Episode: "Galactica Discovers Earth Part 1"
1980	Battles: The Murder That Wouldn't Die	Jill Spencer	TV movie
1980	The Incredible Hulk	Dr. Louise Olson	Episode: "Deep Shock"
1981	Flamingo Road	Arlene Hunter	Episode: "The Victim"
1981	Shannon	Marion Hammond	Episode: "Secret Rage"
1981–1985	Simon & Simon	Helena Christian, Sandra Jefferson-Delaporte	2 episodes
1982	Off Your Rocker	Nurse Gloria	TV movie
1982	Texas	Judith Wheeler	62 episodes
1983	The Powers of Matthew Star	Evita	Episode: "Brain Drain"
1983	Matt Houston	Deena	Episode: "The Centrefold Murders"
1983	Trapper John, M.D.	Senator Miriam Taylor	Episode: "All About Everett"
1984	Whiz Kids	Miriam	Episode: "Father's Day"
1985	Crazy Like a Fox	Olivia Sinclair	Episode: "Sunday in the Park with Larry"
1985	Knight Rider	Sanford	Episode: "Knight Song"
1986	You Again?	Loretta Winslow	Episode: "Marry Me Little"
1986	Murder, She Wrote	Wilhelmina Fraser	Episode: "Keep the Home Fries Burning"
1987-1988	Days of Our Lives	Pamela Fouchier	7 episodes
1988	Katts and Dog	Alice	5 episodes
1989	Street Legal	Jane Morrison	Episode: "Brotherhoods"
1991–1992	The Young and the Restless	Dr. Grace Sundell	4 episodes
