= Quentin Durgens, M.P. =

- Genre: Drama
- Starring: Gordon Pinsent
- Country of origin: Canada
- No. of seasons: 4
- No. of episodes: 41

Production
- Producers: David Gardner; Kirk Jones; John Trent; Ron Weyman
- Running time: 60 minutes

Original release
- Network: CBC
- Release: October 7, 1965 – February 4, 1969

Quentin Durgens, M.P. is a Canadian drama television series that aired on CBC Television from 1965 to 1969. It was one of the first hour-long drama series produced by the CBC, and helped to establish Gordon Pinsent as a major star in Canada. Created by George Robertson, the series first aired in 1965 under the title Mr. Member of Parliament, as a short-run series within the CBC's drama anthology The Serial. It was spun off into a standalone series and retitled Quentin Durgens, M.P. in its second season.

== Plot ==
Set in Ottawa, Ontario and the fictional community of Moose Falls, (Note: whose scenes were filmed in Georgetown, Ontario and St. Marys, Ont.) the series starred Pinsent as Quentin Durgens, an idealistic young lawyer who wins the election as a Member of Parliament, succeeding his father in a by-election after his father's death in office. Durgens is a backbench member of the governing party in the House of Commons, but has a maverick streak and aspires to do the right thing, even if it isn't politically expedient. Some of the storylines within the series were fictionalized depictions of real-life events in Canadian politics, and the series incorporated some documentary filmmaking techniques inspired by the National Film Board.

== Production ==
Alan Macnaughton, the retiring Speaker of the House of Commons of Canada, and David Vivian Currie, the incumbent Sergeant-at-Arms, served as script consultants to ensure that Canadian political process was accurately depicted.

The series was frequently compared in the Canadian press to Slattery's People, an American series about a state legislator which aired on CBS in the 1964–65 season.

The cast also included Suzanne Lévesque, Budd Knapp, Cec Linder, Ovila Légaré and Chris Wiggins.
