= Norman Campbell (director) =

Norman Kenneth Campbell
- Born: February 4, 1924; Los Angeles, California, United States
- Died: April 12, 2004 (aged 80); Toronto, Ontario, Canada
- Spouse: Elaine Helen Leiterman (m. September 6, 1949)
- Children: 5
- Awards: Order of Canada; Order of Ontario

Norman Kenneth Campbell, OC, OOnt, RCA (February 4, 1924 – April 12, 2004) was a Canadian composer, television producer, and television director best known for co-writing Anne of Green Gables - The Musical.

Born in Los Angeles, he joined CBC Vancouver as a radio producer in 1948. In 1952, he went to Toronto to produce the early CBC Television broadcasts, such as Festival (1960–1969). He produced and directed hundreds of television programs between the 1950s and 1990s, including a drama Ballerina (1966). He directed episodes of All in the Family, The Mary Tyler Moore Show and One Day at a Time. In 1978, he was made an Officer of the Order of Canada "in recognition of the distinction he has brought to Canadian theatre through the operas, ballets, plays and musical comedies he has produced on stage and television for well over a quarter-century". Campbell directed six episodes of CBC Television/HBO's family program, Fraggle Rock during the 1980s. In 1998, he was awarded the Order of Ontario for his "many celebrated musical scores over the years, including Anne of Green Gables, an international favourite for more than 30 years". He was named a member of the Royal Canadian Academy of Arts in 1975.
