= St. Lawrence Centre for the Arts =

Performing arts centre in Toronto, Ontario, Canada

Coordinates: 43.64737°N 79.37519°W

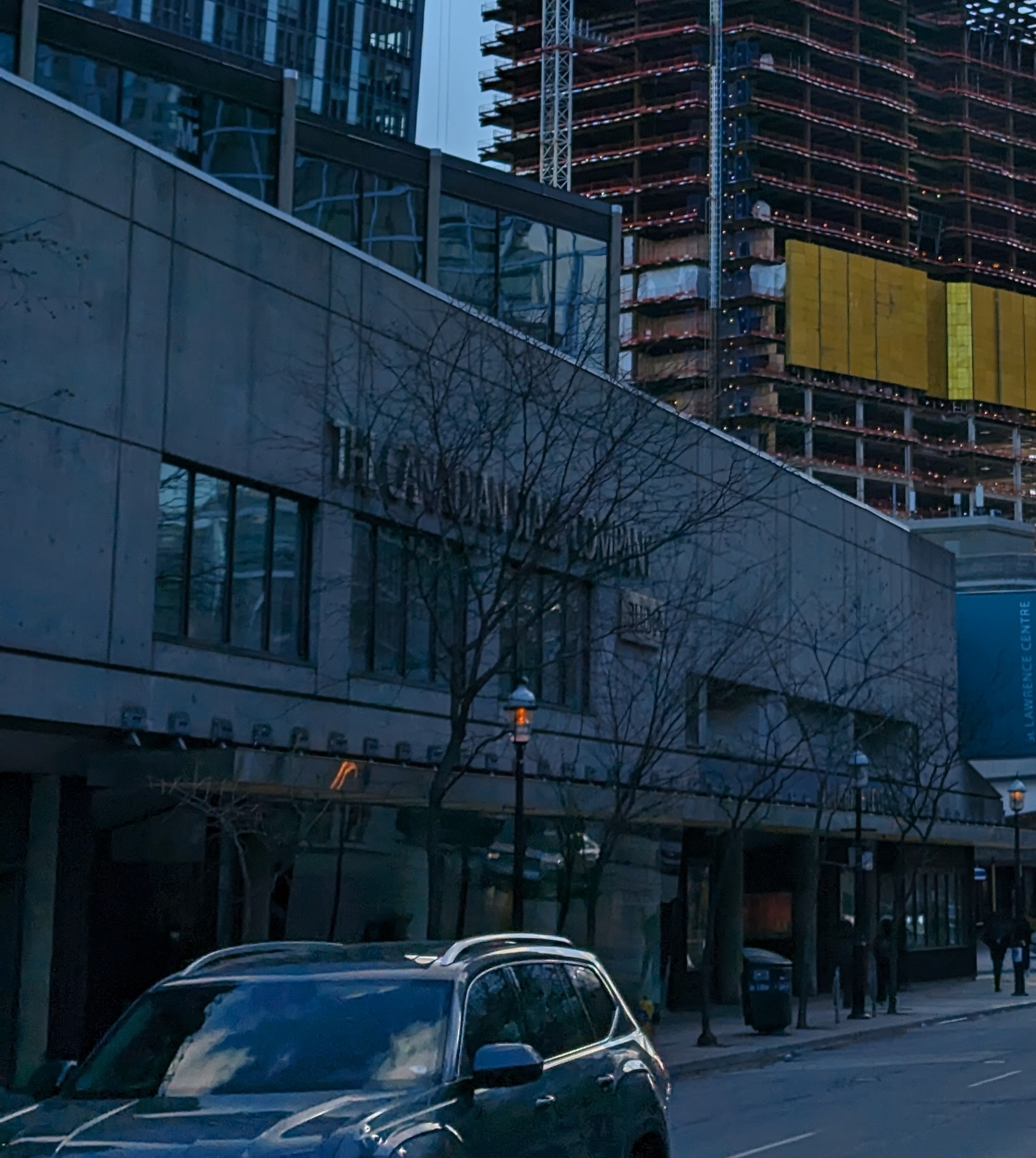
- Interactive map of St. Lawrence Centre for the Arts
- Location: 27 Front Street East; Toronto, Ontario, Canada
- Owner: City of Toronto government
- Capacity: 868 (Bluma Appel Theatre); 499 (Jane Mallett Theatre)
- Type: Performing arts venue

Construction
- Opened: February 2, 1970
- Architect: Gordon S. Adamson and Associates

Website
- www.stlc.com

The St. Lawrence Centre for the Arts is a performing arts theatre complex in downtown Toronto, Ontario, Canada. Located at 27 Front Street East, one block east of Yonge Street, it was the City of Toronto's official centennial project, commemorating the 1967 Canadian Centennial. It houses two auditoriums, the 868-seat Bluma Appel Theatre and the 499-seat Jane Mallett Theatre.

== Facility ==
The centre is municipally owned and was operated from 1983 to 1987 by CentreStage Company (named Toronto Arts Foundation 1964-73, then Toronto Arts Productions 1973-83). General managers of the St. Lawrence Centre have included Mavor Moore 1966-70, Leon Major 1970-80, Victor C. Polley 1980-1, Bruce Swerdfager 1981-5, Michael Noon circa 1985-94, David Wallett circa 1996-2007, and James Roe in 2007.

The CA$2.6-million St. Lawrence Centre for the Arts was designed by Gordon S. Adamson and Associates. It opened on 2 February 1970 after eight years of planning and construction. The building originally housed the 863-seat "Theatre" and the 483-seat "Town Hall".

=== Bluma Appel Theatre ===
The "Theatre" was initially adaptable for thrust stage, proscenium, and caliper formations, and was used for dramatic presentations until 1982, when it was redesigned by The Thom Partnership (Toronto) and the Theatre Projects Consultants. During the CA$5.3-million renovation, the thrust stage was removed, a balcony and boxes helped increase seating, and an optional orchestra pit was provided. It reopened on 19 March 1983 as the Bluma Appel Theatre, in honour of a major donor, Bluma Appel.

Additional restorations to the Centre's theatres and exterior were completed in 2007 by 3rd Uncle Design Inc (Toronto); the CA$3-million construction cost was shared by the city and the Centre's patrons. The Bluma Appel Theatre has been the Canadian Stage Company’s main stage for over 25 years.

=== Jane Mallett Theatre ===
The "Town Hall" was renamed the Jane Mallett Theatre in November 1984, in memory of Canadian actress Jane Mallett. It is used mainly for recitals, chamber concerts, public debates, stage and film presentations.

== Gallery ==
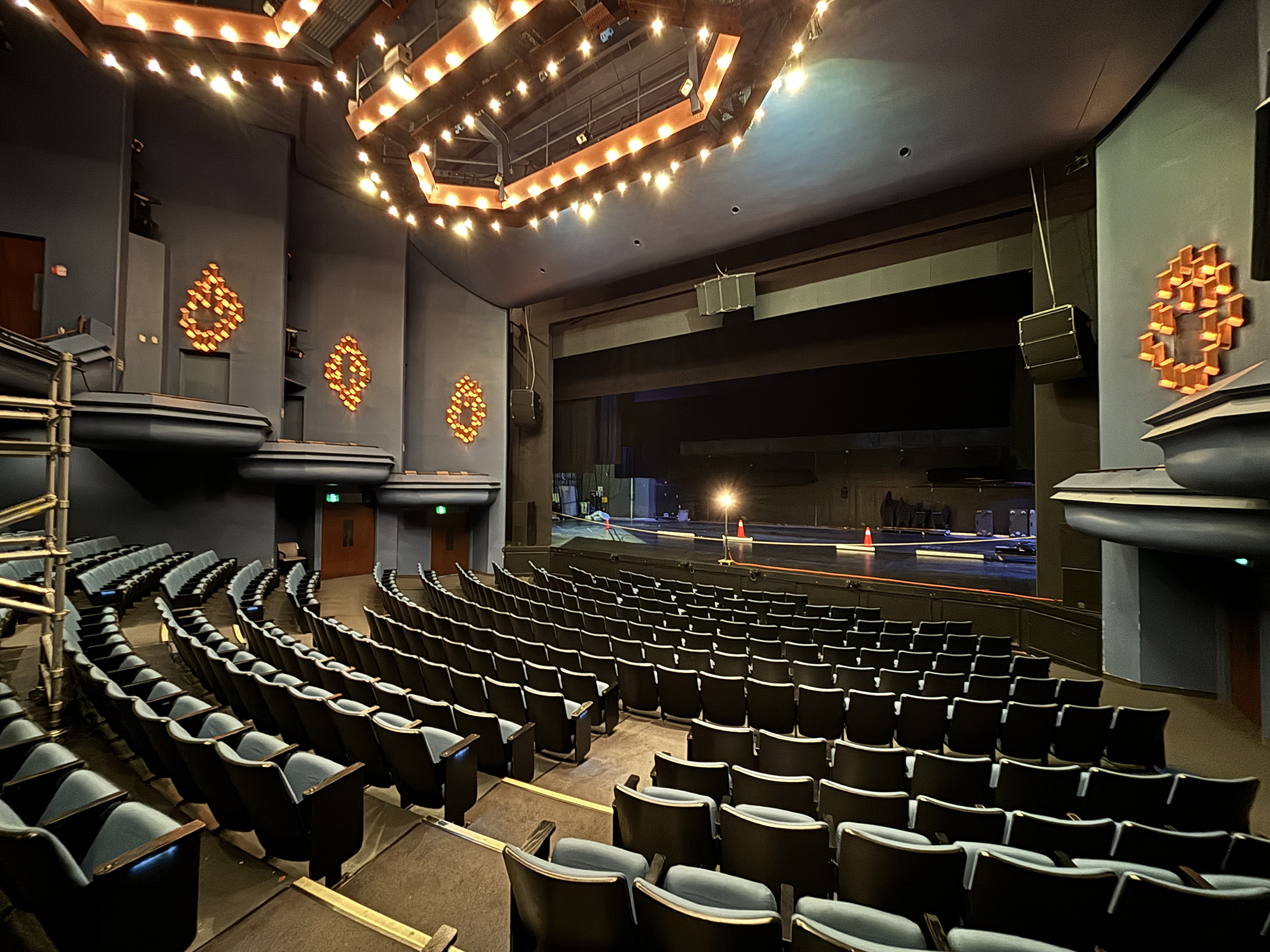
Bluma Appel Theatre

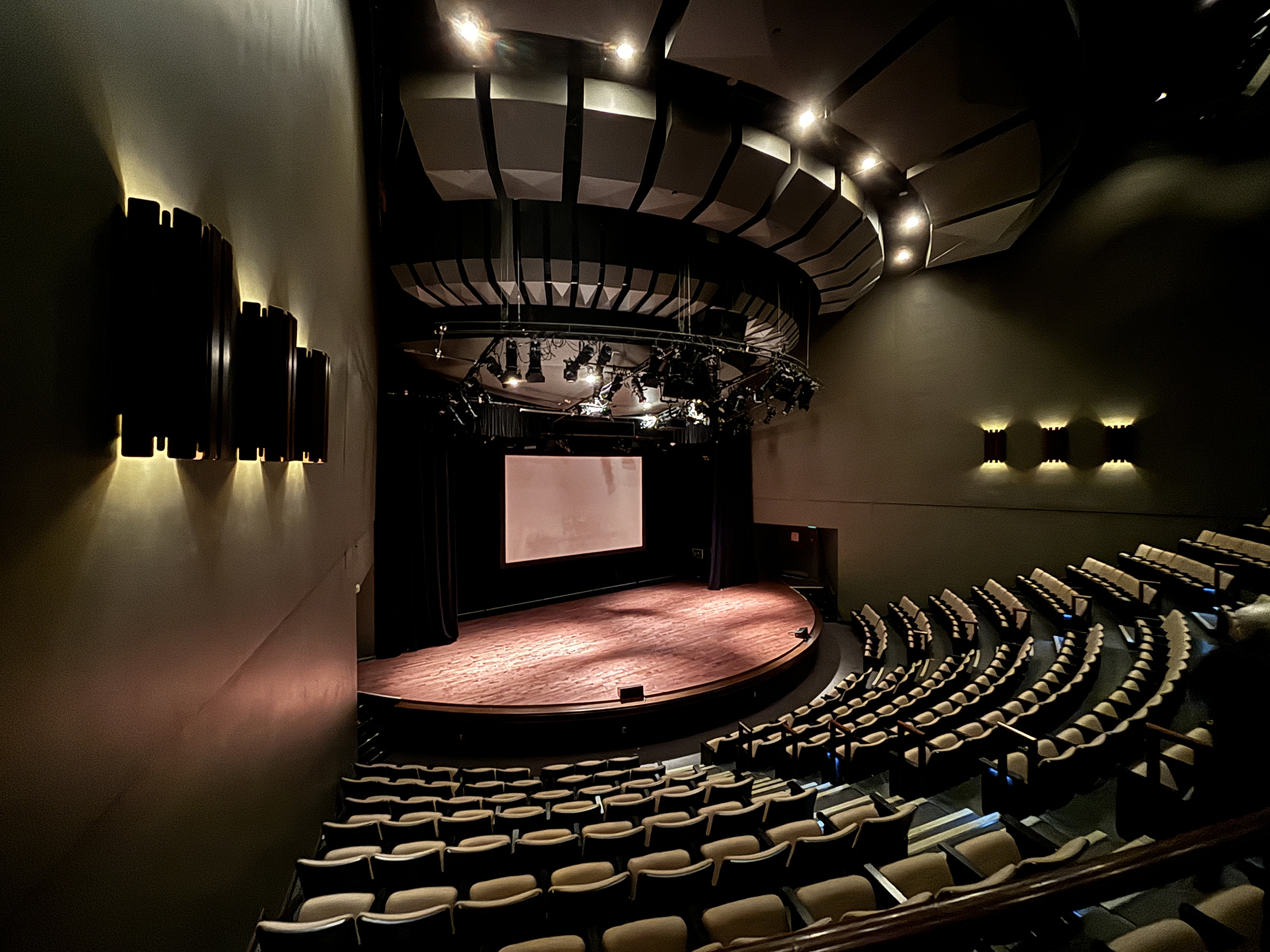
Jane Mallett Theatre

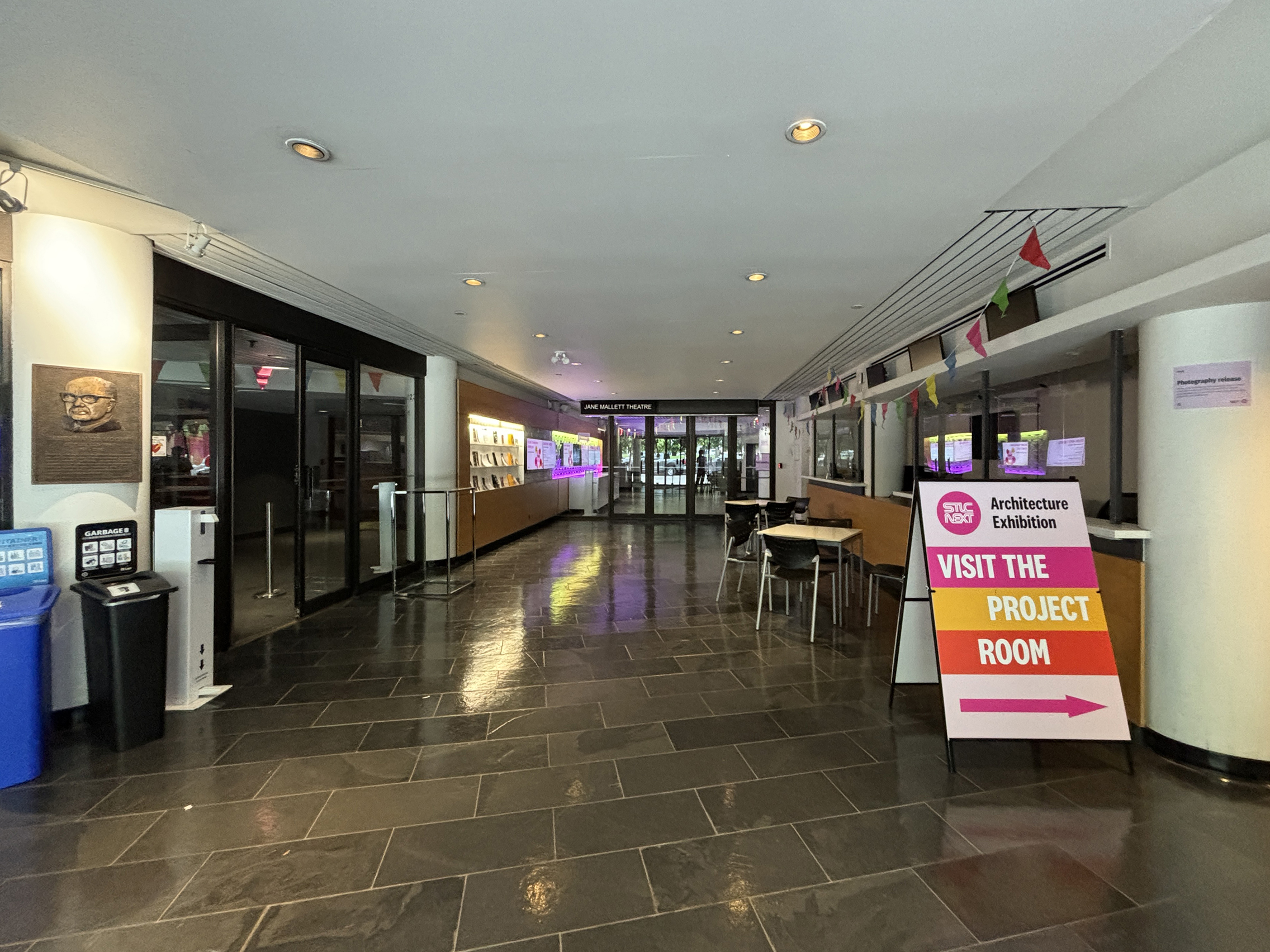
Ticket office

== History ==
Henry Tarvainen was the centre's first resident director. Louis Applebaum was music consultant 1968-71. Franz Kraemer was music director 1971-9, succeeded by a team: Costa Pilavachi, music administrator, and Paul Robinson, director of music programming. Robinson resigned in 1980 and Pilavachi continued in sole charge of music until Jane Forner replaced him in 1982.

In the 1970s and 1980s, music presentations at the St Lawrence Centre for the Arts included several annual series and a broad spectrum of chamber music performances, in addition to special series and events. Canadian Sound, a festival of music by Canadian composers and performers, was presented in 1976. The Orford String Quartet presented a Beethoven series during the 1982-3 season. In addition to its regular chamber series in 1984-5, CentreStage Music (the concert arm of CentreStage) presented its 17-day Bach 300 festival at the St Lawrence Centre and various venues throughout the city. Among others who used the Centre's facilities, COMUS Music Theatre presented the staged premiere of John Beckwith's The Shivaree in the Town Hall in April 1982, and the Canadian Opera Company Ensemble mounted Cosi fan tutte in the Bluma Appel Theatre in 1985.

CentreStage Music ceased its operations on 1 July 1987, and the St. Lawrence Centre became, for musical events, a rental house. The Centre has since hosted a wide variety of performers, including the Gryphon Trio; the St Lawrence and Tokyo string quartets; Marc-André Hamelin; Jon Kimura Parker; the Chamber Players of Toronto; MegaCity Chorus; Nexus; the ORIANA Women's Choir; Youth and Music Canada; and the Elmer Iseler Singers, who premiered Pimooteewin: The Journey (Melissa Hui, composer; Tomson Highway, librettist) at the Centre in February 2008. Festivals held at the Centre have included the New Wave Composers Festival and the Luminato arts festival.
