= Confederation Centre of the Arts =

Performing arts center in Prince Edward Island, Canada

Coordinates: 46.2343072°N 63.1271088°W

- Interactive map of Confederation Centre of the Arts
- Address: 145 Richmond Street
- Location: Charlottetown, Prince Edward Island

Construction
- Opened: 1964
- Architects: Ray Affleck, Hazen Sise, and Dimitri Dimakopoulos (of Arcop)

Website
- www.confederationcentre.com

National Historic Site of Canada
- Official name: Confederation Centre of the Arts National Historic Site of Canada
- Designated: 2003

Confederation Centre of the Arts (French: Centre des arts de la Confédération) is a cultural centre dedicated to the visual and performing arts located in the city of Charlottetown, Prince Edward Island, Canada.

== History ==
Construction of Confederation Centre, as it is commonly referred to, started in 1960 and Queen Elizabeth II officially opened it to the public on October 6, 1964. The institution was originally built with funding by the ten provincial governments in Canada and the federal government as Canada's National Memorial to the Fathers of Confederation, who met in Charlottetown in September 1864 at what was called the Charlottetown Conference. Today its operations are 65% self-funded through ticket sales, memberships, donations, and sponsorships; 25% funded from Canadian Heritage; 6% funded from the Province of PEI; and 4% from other annual granting bodies.

..."[The Fathers of Confederation Memorial Building] is a tribute to those famous men who founded our Confederation. But it is also dedicated to the fostering of those things that enrich the mind and delight the heart, those intangible but precious things that give meaning to a society and help create from it a civilization and a culture."

— Prime Minister L. B. Pearson, Opening Ceremonies for the Confederation Centre of the Arts, October 6, 1964

The centre has played host to the Charlottetown Festival every summer since 1965, although there was no 2020 Charlottetown Festival due to the global COVID-19 pandemic. It holds the Guinness World Record for the longest running annual musical theatre production, Anne of Green Gables — The Musical, performed every summer from 1965 until 2019. Hundreds of other productions have been featured. The centre was designated a National Historic Sites of Canada in 2003.

In 2011 the mainstage Homburg Theatre underwent a $17-million renovation to improve acoustics, seating, lighting, and rigging. The project was completed in time for the centre's 50th anniversary in 2014.

== Architecture ==
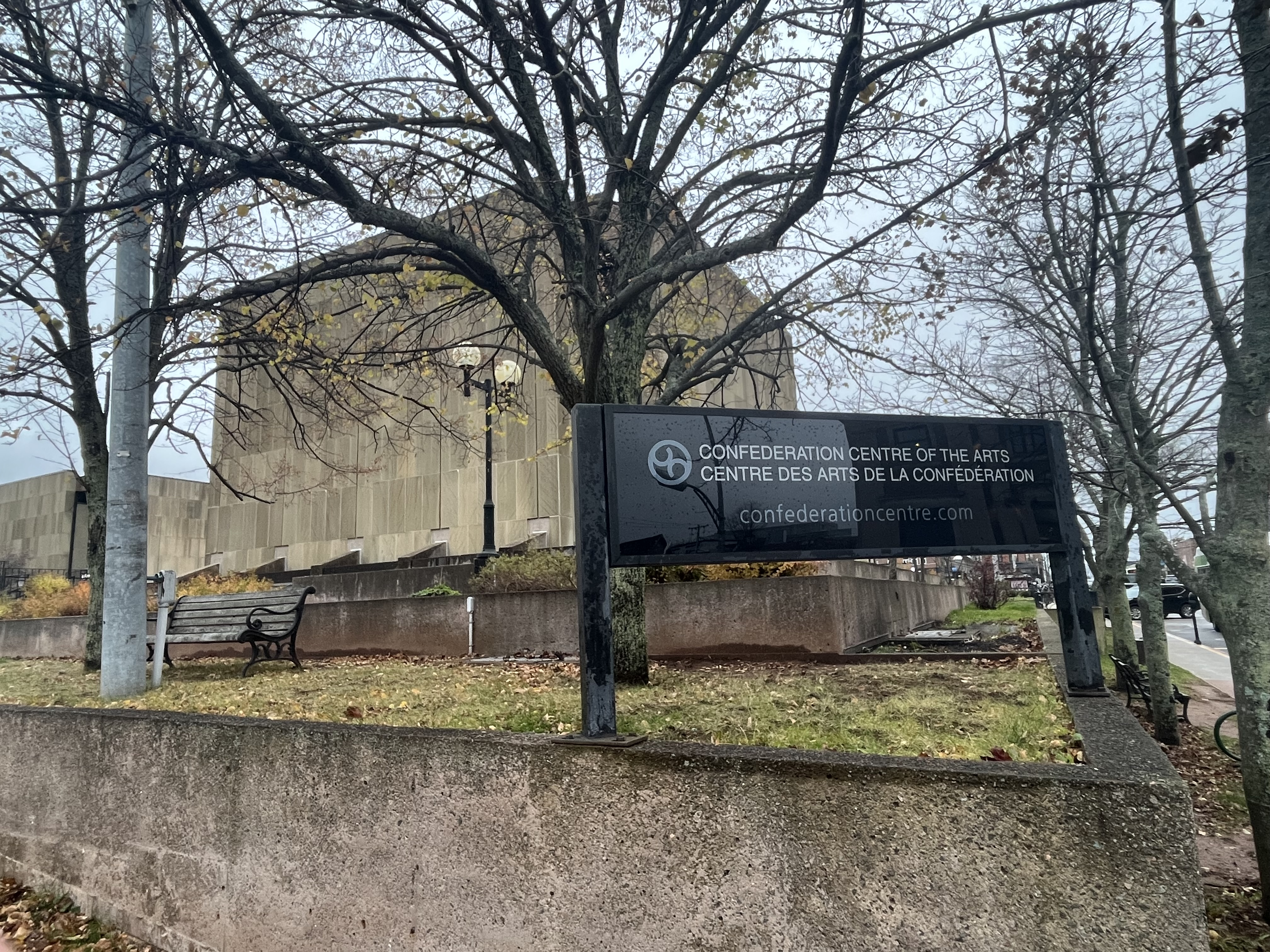
View of the Confederation Centre of the Arts from the Province House.

Confederation Centre was built on Queen's Square in the centre of Charlottetown's business district, immediately west of Province House, Prince Edward Island's legislature and the location of the Charlottetown Conference. The centre is one contiguous structure, however at street level it appears as three separate buildings (hosting a theatre and art gallery) clustered around "Memorial Hall" which faces east toward Province House. The Confederation Chambre in Province House, where the conference meetings took place, is located on the western side of that building, thus facing directly at Confederation Centre's Memorial Hall.

Confederation Centre covers a block in the central business district, bounded on three sides by Grafton Street, Queen Street, and Richmond Street. The structure houses an art museum, and several performing arts venues.

=== Art museum ===
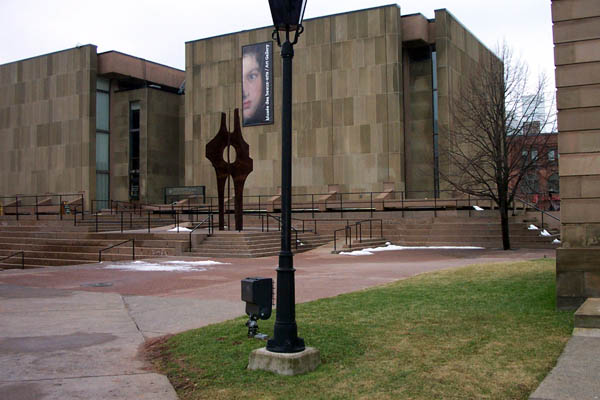
Exterior of the Confederation Centre Art Gallery portion of the building.

Opened at the same time as the rest of the structure, the Confederation Centre Art Gallery is an art museum in the northeast pavilion of the Confederation Centre of the Arts. The art gallery pavilion is housed in a three-storey structure, that includes over 3,250 square metres (35,000 sq ft) of exhibition space. As of June 2017, it held over 17,000 works in its permanent collection.

=== Theatres ===
The Confederation Centre of the Arts includes a number of venues for the performing arts. These include a 1,109 seat mainstage theatre, the largest theatre mainstage in Canada east of Montreal; and two studio theatres.
