= Charlottetown Festival =

Coordinates: 46.2343072°N 63.1271088°W

The Charlottetown Festival is a seasonal Canadian musical theatre festival which has run from late May to mid-October every year since 1965.

The Charlottetown Festival is hosted in Confederation Centre of the Arts every year. Named after its host city of Charlottetown, Prince Edward Island, since its inception in 1965 the festival has showcased Canada's longest-running musical, Anne of Green Gables: The Musical. It also seeks out and commissions new Canadian musicals, including Evangeline, Emily, Johnny Belinda, Stories From The Red Dirt Road, On The Road With Dutch Mason, Tell Tale Harbour, Bittergirl: The Musical, Maggie, and Rockabye Hamlet.

Anne of Green Gables: The Musical debuted in 1965 and holds the Guinness World Record for longest-running annual musical, being performed every summer up to 2019. The production was cancelled in 2020 and 2021 due to the COVID-19 pandemic. After returning the musical to the stage in 2022, the festival announced that the musical would from then on be staged every second year. The production has also toured to Japan, New York City, and across Canada.

The festival includes a summer musical theatre training program called the Confederation Centre Young Company. The Young Company shows are free to the public and take place at noon outside the Confederation Centre. The shows typically feature Canadian-themed content. In 2011, Indigenous playwright Cathy Elliott wrote and directed The Talking Stick, featuring an all-Indigenous cast. The piece was performed for the Prince William and Princess Catherine during their tour of Prince Edward Island in 2011. As a Canada 150 Signature Project, the Young Company toured the country in 2017, presenting the original musical The Dream Catchers and working with youth in each city. The Dream Catchers was also performed for Prime Minister Justin Trudeau in October 2017, during the Confederation Centre's presentation of the annual Symons Medal and Lecture in Charlottetown.

Past artistic directors of the festival include Mavor Moore, Alan Lund, Jacques Lemay, Duncan MacIntosh, Anne Allan, and Walter Learning. The current artistic director is Adam Brazier.

== See also ==
- Prince Edward Island
