= MV Northumberland (2006) =

Canadian ferry

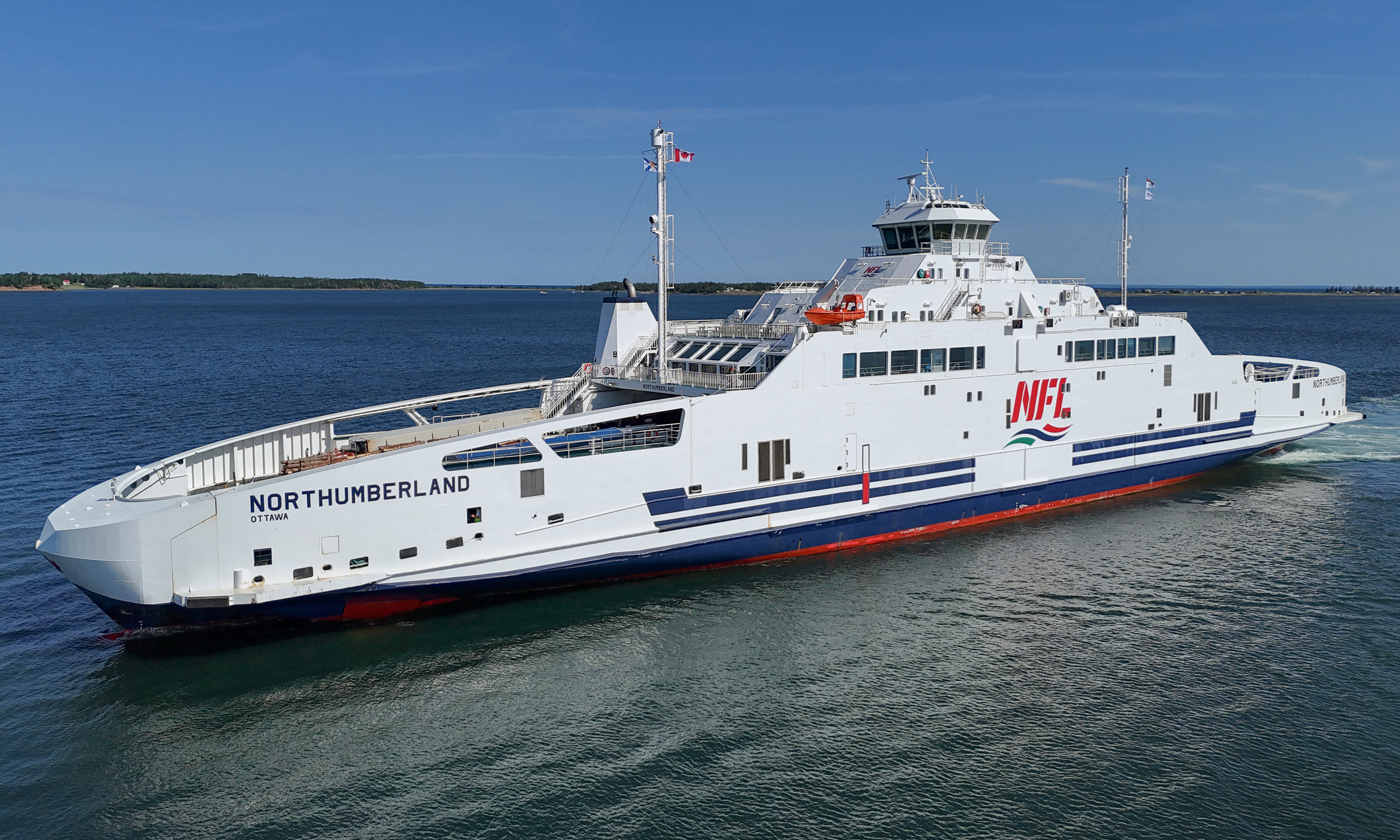
- Northumberland arriving in Caribou, July 2025

History
- Name: Fanafjord; Northumberland
- Owner: Fjord1 (2007–2023); Government of Canada (2023–present)
- Operator: Northumberland Ferries Limited
- Port of registry: (Canada) Charlottetown
- Builder: Aker Yards in Brattvåg, Norway
- Completed: 2006
- In service: 2007-present
- Identification: IMO number: 9344758

General characteristics
- Type: Ferry
- Length: 129.8 m (425 ft 10 in)
- Beam: 18.7 m (61 ft 4 in)
- Draught: 4.5 m (14 ft 9 in)
- Decks: 8
- Installed power: Diesel engine
- Propulsion: Diesel-electric propulsion; azimuth thrusters
- Speed: 19.5 knots (36.1 km/h; 22.4 mph)
- Capacity: 600 passengers; 180 vehicles; 18 tractor-trailers

MV Northumberland is a Canadian RORO ferry which operates on a seasonal basis between Caribou, Nova Scotia and Wood Islands, Prince Edward Island from May to December. It is operated by Northumberland Ferries Limited (NFL). The vessel is owned by the Government of Canada and was acquired as an interim replacement following the loss of MV Holiday Island in 2022.

== Construction ==
Northumberland was constructed at the Aker Yards shipyard at Brattvåg, Norway, and completed in 2007. The vessel is a double-ended roll-on/roll-off ferry designed for short- to medium-distance crossings with frequent port calls.

As built, the ship measures 129.8 m (425 ft 10 in) in length, with a beam of 18.7 m (61 ft 4 in) and a draught of approximately 4.5 m (14 ft 9 in). The ferry has eight decks, including two vehicle decks and enclosed passenger accommodation. Propulsion is provided by a diesel-electric system driving azimuth thrusters, allowing for enhanced maneuverability in confined harbours.

== Service history ==
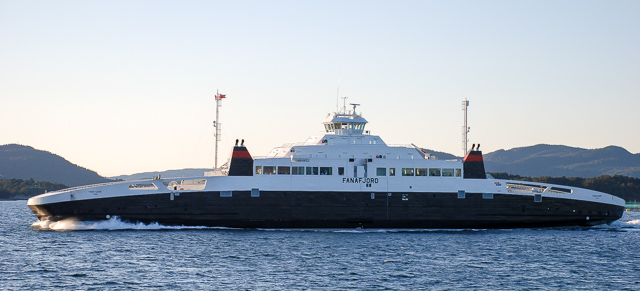
Fanafjord in service with Fjord1 in 2007

The vessel entered service in 2007 as Fanafjord for Fjord1, operating on ferry routes in western Norway.

Following a major engine-room fire aboard Holiday Island in July 2022, the Government of Canada sought an interim replacement to restore capacity on the Wood Islands–Caribou route while permanent replacement vessels are developed. On 16 November 2023, Public Services and Procurement Canada announced the acquisition of Fanafjord for this purpose. The ship was subsequently renamed Northumberland.

Northumberland was retrofitted at Fiskerstrand Verft and delivered to Transport Canada in December 2024.

Northumberland arrived in Canada on 26 January 2025 and was berthed in Pictou, Nova Scotia for additional refit work prior to entering service. The vessel entered service in mid-June 2025, operating alongside MV Confederation to restore two-ship operations during peak-season demand.

== See also ==
- MV Confederation
- MV Holiday Island
