= MV Holiday Island =

Canadian ferry

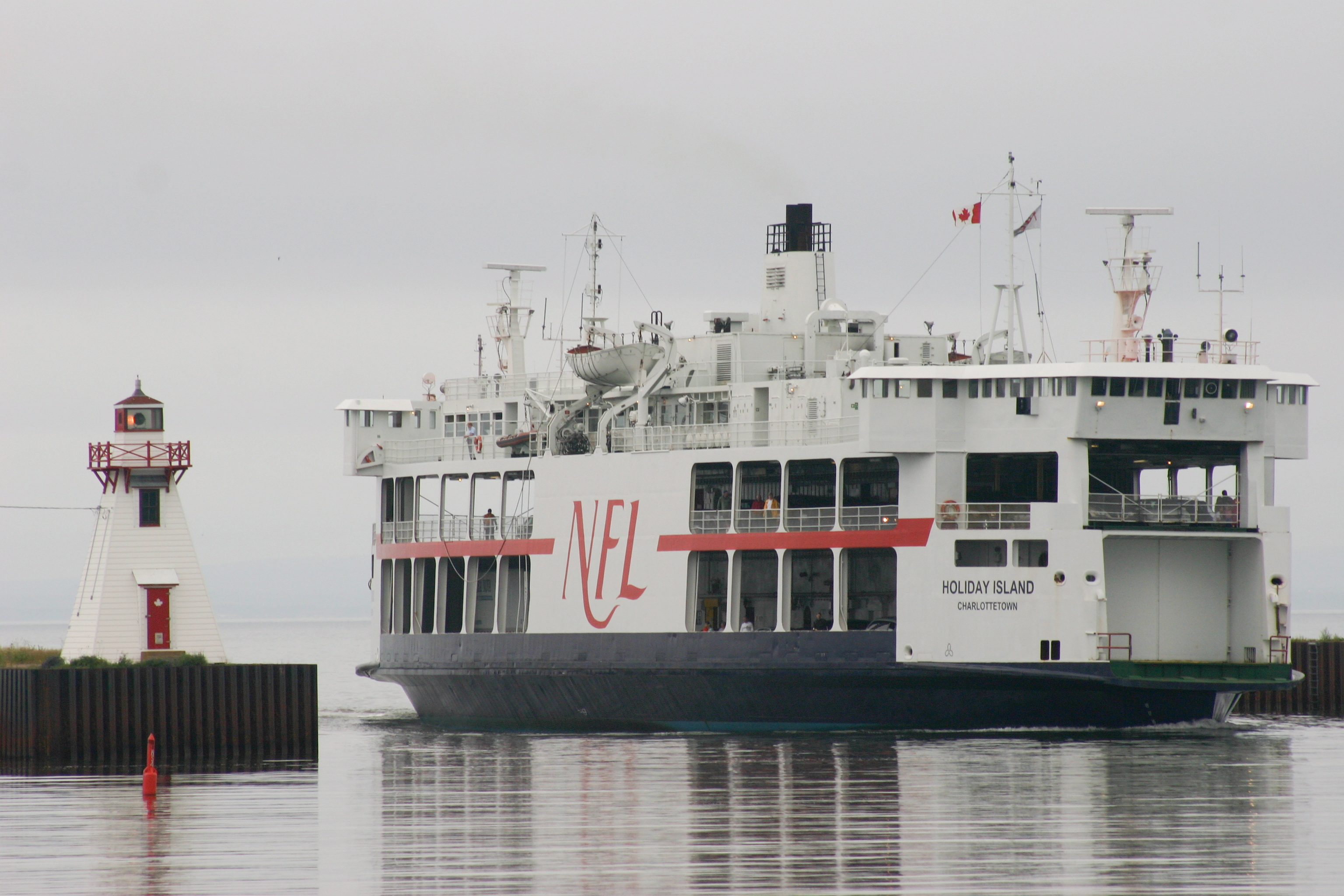
- MV Holiday Island approaching Wood Islands harbour in 2006

History
- Name: William Pope; Holiday Island
- Owner: Government of Canada (1971–1979); CN Marine (1979–1987); Marine Atlantic (1987–1997); Government of Canada (1997–2023)
- Port of registry: (Canada) Charlottetown
- Builder: Port Weller Dry Docks, St. Catharines, Ontario
- Yard number: 53
- Laid down: April 1970
- Launched: 28 June 1970
- Completed: 27 April 1971
- Out of service: 22 July 2022
- Identification: IMO number: 7041431; MMSI number: 316001466; Call sign: VGCY
- Fate: Scrapped in 2023

General characteristics as built
- Type: Ferry
- Tonnage: 3,037 GT; 1,397 DWT
- Length: 97.9 m (321 ft 2 in) oa; 96.6 m (316 ft 11 in) pp
- Beam: 20.8 m (68 ft 3 in)
- Installed power: Diesel engine
- Propulsion: 2 propeller
- Speed: 13 knots (24 km/h; 15 mph)

MV Holiday Island was a Canadian RORO ferry that operated across the Northumberland Strait between the ports of Wood Islands, Prince Edward Island and Caribou, Nova Scotia. The vessel was owned by the Government of Canada and was managed and operated by Northumberland Ferries Limited. After suffering a serious fire, the ship was broken up for scrap in 2023.

== Construction and design ==
The roll-on/roll-off ferry was ordered for construction by the Government of Canada and the vessel's keel was laid down at Port Weller Dry Docks in St. Catharines, Ontario, in April 1970. The ship was launched with the name William Pope on 28 June 1970 and later renamed Holiday Island to reflect the vessel's purpose, which was to augment transportation services for summer tourists. Construction was completed on 27 April 1971. Holiday Island measured 97.9 metres (321 ft 2 in) long overall and 96.6 m (316 ft 11 in) between perpendiculars, with a beam of 20.8 metres (68 ft 3 in) as built. The vessel's length overall increased to 99.06 m (325 ft 0 in) and has a draught of 5 metres (16 ft 5 in).

The ship was ordered as a result of increased tourist traffic to Prince Edward Island and the vessel's open decks allowed for the storage of more vehicles. Holiday Island's roll-on/roll-off capability allowed for a more efficient and quicker loading and unloading process. The ship was assessed at 3,307 gross tonnage (GT), 1,397 tons deadweight (DWT), and has 1,593 net tonnage (NT). She has a capacity for 399 passengers and 155 vehicles. The vessel has a complement of 22. The ship was initially powered by a diesel engine turning one propeller creating 12 knots (22 km/h; 14 mph). She is a sister ship to MV Vacationland.

== Service history ==
Initially owned by the Government of Canada, ownership was transferred to CN Marine in 1979 and then to Marine Atlantic in 1987. Holiday Island served on a service at the western end of the Northumberland Strait, crossing at Abegweit Passage, between the ports of Cape Tormentine, New Brunswick and Port Borden, Prince Edward Island (PEI).

The opening of the Confederation Bridge on 1 June 1997 saw Marine Atlantic close its ferry services to Prince Edward Island, and all of its vessels on this route except Holiday Island were sold off by the Crown Assets division of the Department of Public Works and Government Services. Holiday Island sailed 100 kilometres (62 mi) to the east end of the strait and began service that month under the colours of Northumberland Ferries Limited, replacing two smaller ferries (MV Prince Nova, which was sold to a ferry company operating in Long Island Sound, and MV Prince Edward, which was sold to the Government of Newfoundland and Labrador).

In 2016, Holiday Island was removed from service and sent to a shipyard in Quebec so that necessary repairs could be made after significant corrosion was found in the ballast tanks. In early October 2016, Holiday Island arrived in Wood Islands, PEI, after undergoing repairs and re-entered service later that month. She also sports the new livery of Northumberland Ferries, along with MV Confederation.

=== 2022 fire ===
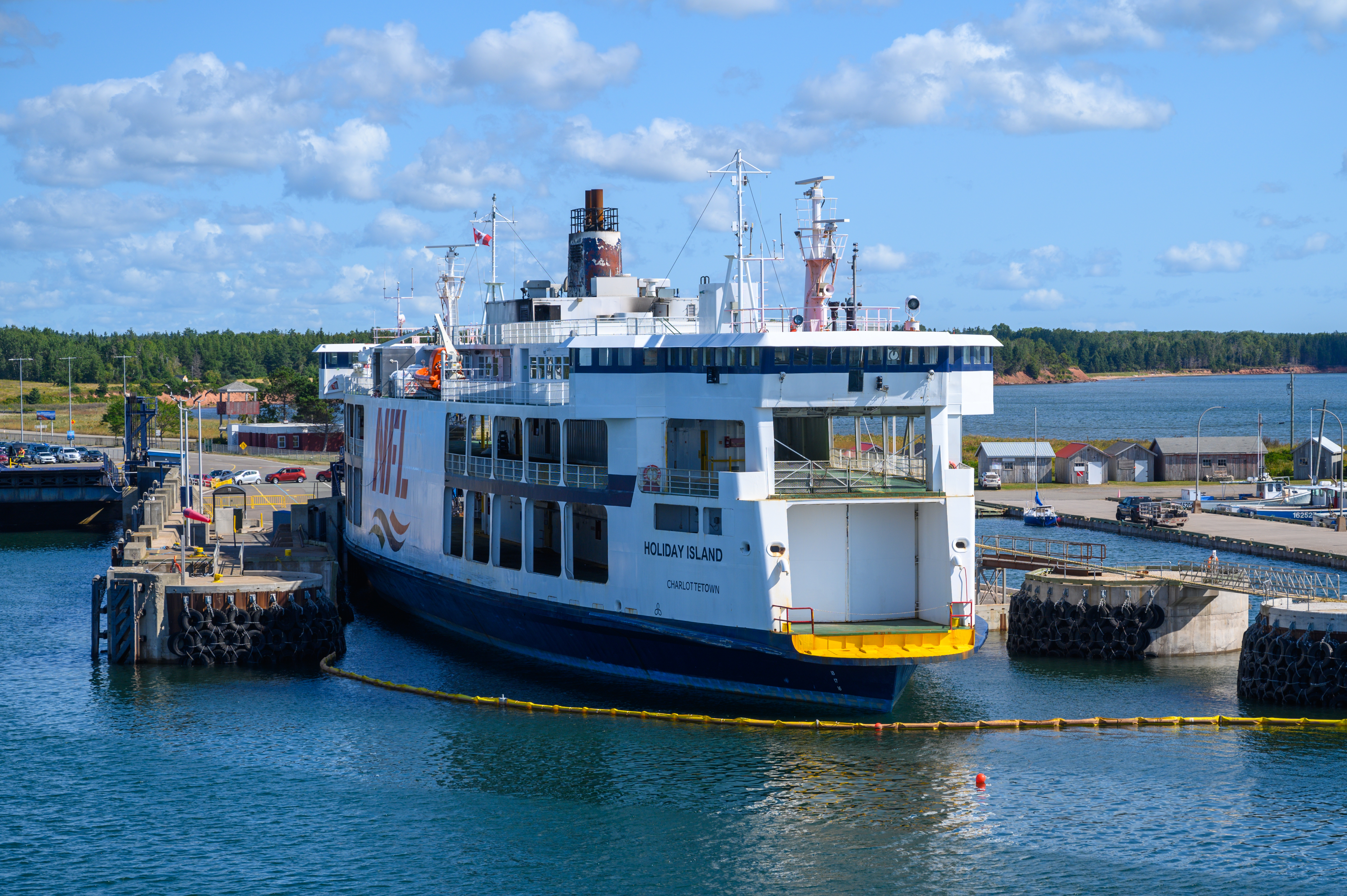
Holiday Island at Wood Islands terminal after engine fire

On 22 July 2022, a fire broke out in the engine room on board Holiday Island as it was approaching the harbour at Wood Islands. Over 200 people were evacuated by lifeboats and other vessels. There were no reported injuries. All ferry departures were cancelled for the rest of the day, as well as the following four days, 23 to 26 July. Initial firefighting efforts were discontinued on 22 July at 9:30 PM out of an abundance of caution for the firefighting crew. The fire was suspected to be burning in the engine room and funnels for days after the initial incident. Days later, Northumberland Ferries said there would be no layoffs as a result of the fire.

On 23 July, a tugboat towed the vessel from the Wood Islands harbour narrows to allow Confederation to access the harbour so that ferry service could resume. Images of the vessel from 23 July showed a slight list to starboard as bilges were reported to have filled with water from firefighting efforts, along with the vessel itself taking on sea water. On the afternoon of 24 July, crew began the removal of vehicles from the ferry. Over the next week, dewatering efforts corrected the list and allowed personnel to enter the engine room.

With Holiday Island out of service for the remainder of the 2022 operating season, another ferry, Saaremaa 1, owned by the Société des traversiers du Québec, was loaned to Northumberland Ferries in early August. Following testing and crew training, Saaremaa 1 entered service on 20 August.

== Fate ==
As a result of the fire, it was determined that the ship was damaged beyond repair and Transport Canada issued a request for proposals to dispose of the ferry. Holiday Island was scrapped in 2023 after the contract was awarded to R.J. MacIsaac Construction in Sheet Harbour, Nova Scotia.
