= Sankaty =

Historic ferry operated on many important routes

Coordinates: 46°30′N 61°40′W

- Postcard image of the steamer Sankaty off of Oak Bluffs, Massachusetts.

History
- Name: Sankaty (1911–1947); Charles A. Dunning (1947–1964)
- Owner: New Bedford, Martha's Vineyard & Nantucket Steamboat Company (1911–1924); New England Steamship Company (1924–1925); Snow Marine Company (1925–1931); Stamford-Oyster Bay Ferries Corporation (1931–1940); Northumberland Ferries (1947–1964)
- Port of registry: (United States) New Bedford, Massachusetts (1911–1925); (United States) Rockland, Maine (1925–1931); (United States) Bridgeport, Connecticut (1931–1940); (Canada) Charlottetown, Prince Edward Island (1947–1964)
- Builder: Fore River Works, Quincy
- Yard number: 192
- Launched: February 2, 1911
- Completed: April 1911
- Out of service: 1964
- Fate: Sunk in 1964

Canada
- Name: Sankaty
- Acquired: 1940
- Commissioned: September 24, 1940
- Decommissioned: August 18, 1945
- Fate: Returned to commercial service 1945

General characteristics as built
- Tonnage: 677 GRT
- Length: 195 ft (59 m)
- Beam: 32 ft (10 m) (at waterline); 36 ft (11 m) (on deck)
- Draught: 9.6 ft (2.9 m)
- Depth: 13 ft (4 m)
- Installed power: Triple expansion engine
- Propulsion: 2 propellers
- Speed: 14 knots (16 mph)

Sankaty (a.k.a. HMCS Sankaty, a.k.a. Charles A. Dunning) was a propeller-driven steamer that served as a ferry to Martha's Vineyard and Nantucket in Massachusetts; in Rockland, Maine; Stamford, Connecticut and Oyster Bay, Long Island in the United States from 1911 to 1940. During World War II, the ship was requisitioned by the Royal Canadian Navy for service as a minelayer and maintenance vessel along the Canadian Atlantic coast. Following the war the ship returned to a ferry, working the Wood Islands, Prince Edward Island and Caribou, Nova Scotia route in Canada from 1947 until 1964. While being towed to the breaker's yard, the ship sank off the coast of Nova Scotia on October 27, 1964.

== Description ==
Sankaty was designed by Chauncey G. Whiton. The ship was 195 feet (59 m) long, a slim vessel with twin propellers and twin smokestacks. She had a 36-foot (11 m) beam, and 32 feet (10 m) at the waterline and drew 9 feet 6 inches (2.9 m) of water. The ship had a depth of hold of 13 feet (4.0 m). The ship had a gross register tonnage (GRT) of 657 tons. Sankaty rolled much more than the sidewheelers that preceded it. Because of this, the ladies' parlor and toilet was situated on the upper deck in a location to reduce the motion and vibration while on the rough waters of Vineyard Sound.

The ship was powered by a triple expansion engine fed by steam from four Almy water-tube boilers turning the two propellers. The ship had a maximum speed of 14 knots (16 mph). In Canadian naval service, the ship had standard displacement of 459 long tons (466 t), a complement of 3 officers and 39 ratings and the vessel was armed with one .303 machine gun.

== Career ==
=== Martha's Vineyard and Nantucket Ferry ===
The steamer Sankaty

Sankaty built by the Fore River Works in Quincy, Massachusetts with the yard number 192. The ship was launched on 2 February 1911 and completed in April. From her construction in 1911 until 1924, Sankaty operated as a ferry for the New Bedford, Martha's Vineyard & Nantucket Steamboat Company, serving the islands of Martha's Vineyard and Nantucket. While not the first propeller-driven steamer to serve these islands (which was Helen Augusta which substituted for Monohansett during the American Civil War) it marked the end of the paddlewheel steamer era for the Cape and Islands.

On February 20, 1917, she went ashore on Wilburs Point at Sconticut Neck near New Bedford, Massachusetts. The vessel was refloated, repaired and returned to service.

=== 1924 fire, Maine and New York Ferry Service ===
On the night of June 30, 1924, Sankaty caught fire and burned down to her steel hull while tied up overnight in New Bedford harbor. She drifted across the Acushnet River in flames and crashed into the whaling ship Charles W. Morgan, setting her on fire as well.

Sankaty was raised, sold and rebuilt with an open deck for use as a car ferry in Rockland, Maine. Owned by the New England Steamship Company, the vessel was sold to Snow Marine Company in 1925. In 1931, the vessel was sold again, this time to the Stamford-Oyster Bay Ferries Corporation to serve as a ferry between Stamford, Connecticut, and Oyster Bay, Long Island.

=== Canadian service and fate ===
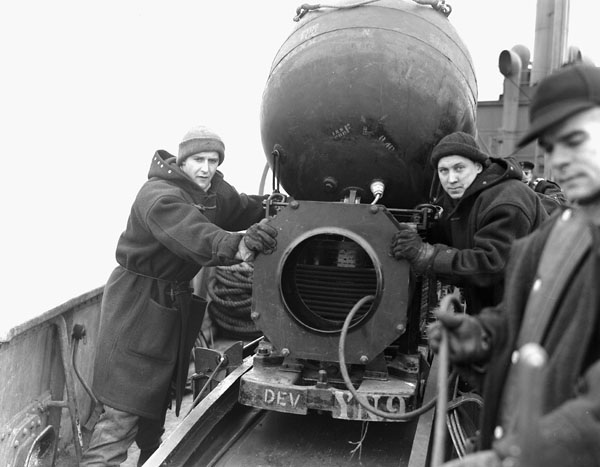
Sailors with a mine aboard HMCS Sankaty off Halifax, Nova Scotia, March 1941

In 1940 Sankaty was purchased by Northumberland Ferries of Prince Edward Island, Canada, but before she began service she was requisitioned by the Royal Canadian Navy that year to serve in World War II as a minelayer, HMCS Sankaty. The ship was commissioned on 24 September 1940 at Halifax, Nova Scotia and was also used as a maintenance vessel. With the end of the war, the ship was paid off on 18 August 1945. Never entirely suitable for job as a minelayer, the ship was replaced in Canadian service by HMCS Whitethroat.

After the war she was renamed Charles A. Dunning, and served from 1946 until 1964 in the waters between Wood Islands, Prince Edward Island and Caribou, Nova Scotia. During this period her capacity was twenty-three cars and four trucks. She was sold for scrap in 1964, but sank en route to Sydney, Nova Scotia on October 27, 1964.

== The new Sankaty ==
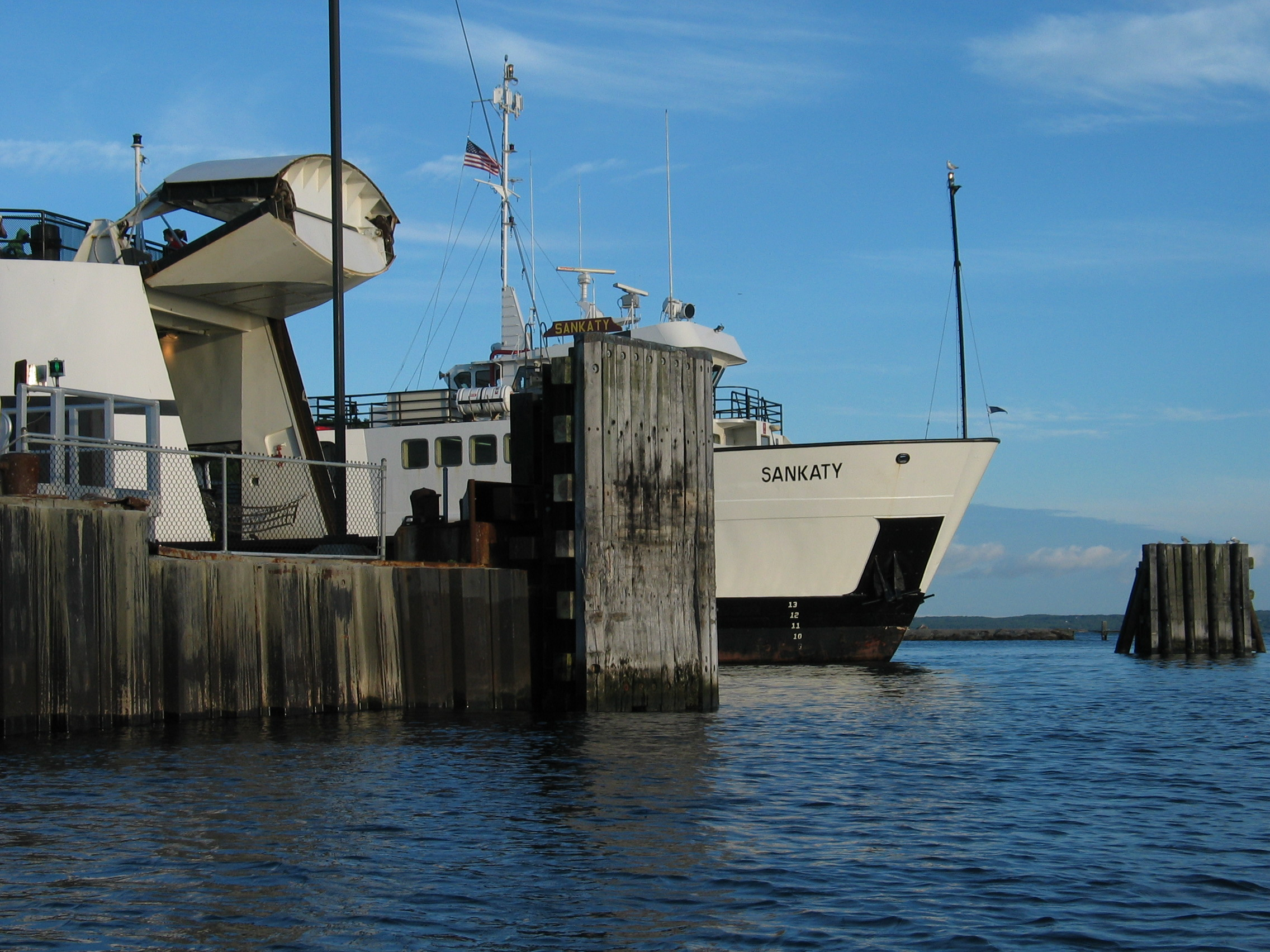
The new MV Sankaty at the wharf in Woods Hole

In 1994, The Woods Hole, Martha's Vineyard and Nantucket Steamship Authority began service of a new freight vessel Sankaty, named after this steamer.
