= Capt. Earl W. Winsor =

Canadian ferry

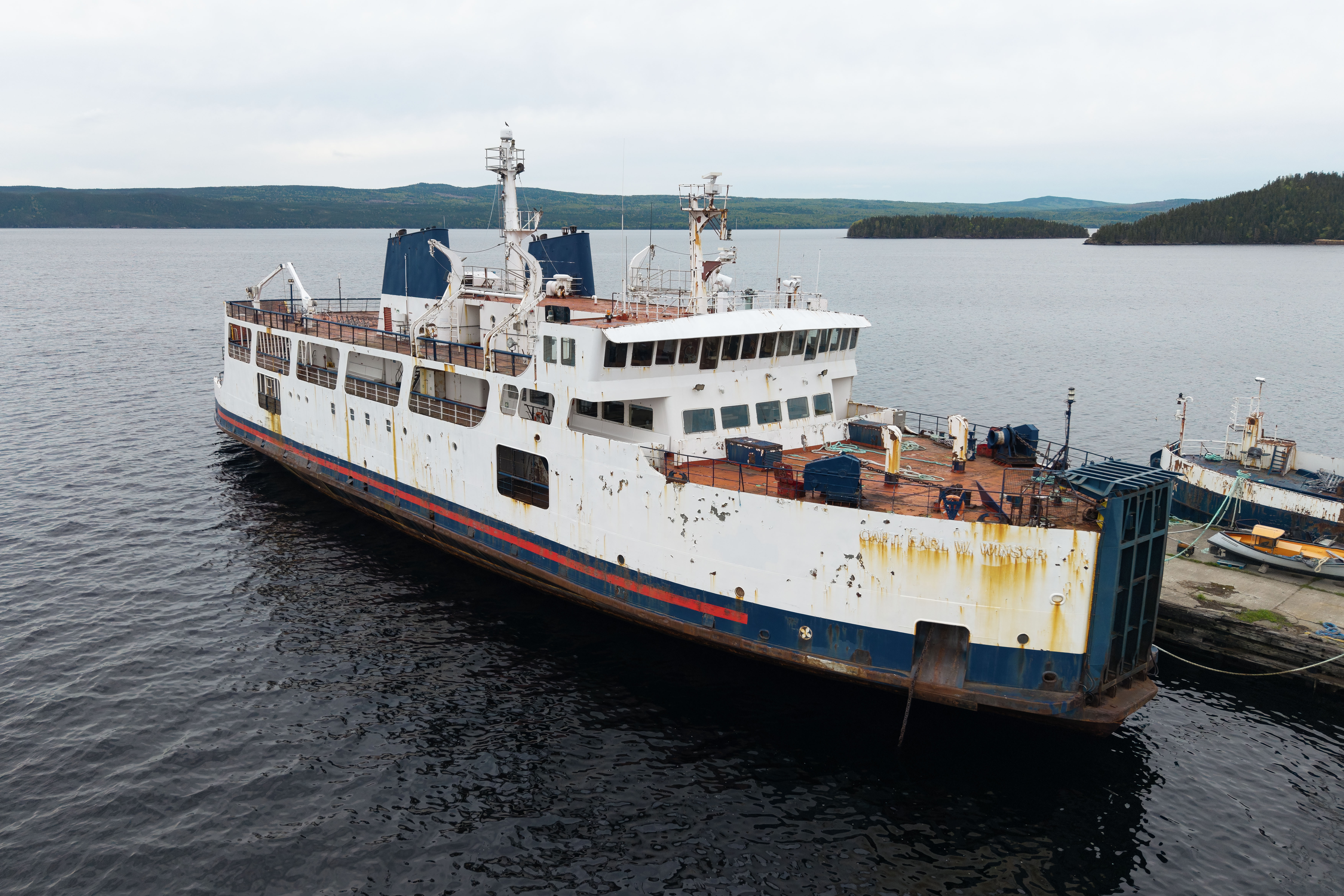
- Capt. Earl W. Winsor laid up at Springdale in June 2026

History
- Name: Prince Edward (1972–1998); Capt. Earl W. Winsor (1998–present)
- Namesake: Earl W. Winsor
- Owner: Government of Canada (1972–1997); Government of Newfoundland and Labrador (1997–2018); Private ownership (2018–present)
- Operator: Northumberland Ferries Limited (1972–1997); Government of Newfoundland and Labrador (1998–2016)
- Route: Wood Islands–Caribou (1972–1997); Farewell–Fogo Island–Change Islands (1998–2016)
- Builder: Ferguson Industries
- Completed: October 1972
- Out of service: 2016
- Identification: IMO number: 7236270; Official number: 331725 (Canada)
- Status: Laid up

General characteristics
- Type: Roll-on/roll-off passenger and vehicle ferry
- Tonnage: 1,772 GRT; 927 NRT
- Displacement: Approximately 2,100 long tons loaded
- Length: 75.9 m (249 ft 0 in) overall
- Beam: 16.3 m (53 ft 6 in)
- Draught: 3.8 m (12 ft 6 in) loaded
- Installed power: 2 × EMD diesel engines, 1,600 bhp (1,200 kW) each
- Propulsion: Twin Kamewa controllable-pitch propellers; twin rudders
- Capacity: 250–300 passengers; 60 automobiles

MV Capt. Earl W. Winsor is a former Canadian roll-on/roll-off passenger and vehicle ferry. Completed in 1972 as MV Prince Edward, she operated between Wood Islands, Prince Edward Island, and Caribou, Nova Scotia until 1997. After being purchased and refitted by the Government of Newfoundland and Labrador, she was renamed in honour of master mariner and former provincial cabinet minister Earl Winsor and entered service on the Farewell–Fogo Island–Change Islands route in 1998. The ferry left service in 2016, was sold into private ownership in 2018, and has remained laid up at Springdale since then.

== Design and construction ==
Construction of Prince Edward began at Ferguson Industries in Pictou in April 1971, and the vessel was completed in October 1972.

The steel-hulled ferry is 75.9 metres (249 ft 0 in) long overall, with a beam of 16.3 metres (53 ft 6 in) and a loaded draught of 3.8 metres (12 ft 6 in). She has a gross register tonnage of 1,772 and a net register tonnage of 927, and was built to carry 250–300 passengers and 60 automobiles.

== Service history ==
=== Prince Edward ===
Prince Edward entered service in 1972 on the seasonal route across the Northumberland Strait between Wood Islands and Caribou. The federally owned ferry was operated by Northumberland Ferries Limited and remained on the crossing for 25 years. In 1997, the Government of Newfoundland and Labrador purchased her from Transport Canada for $300,000.

=== Newfoundland and Labrador ===
The province spent over $2 million preparing the ferry for provincial service. The work included inspections and repairs to her machinery and electrical systems, the installation of loading ramps, refurbishment of the passenger spaces, and strengthening of the hull for ice operations.

The ferry was officially renamed Capt. Earl W. Winsor on 23 June 1998 in honour of Earl Winsor. Winsor had served in the Canadian Merchant Navy during the Second World War and represented Labrador North and Fogo in the House of Assembly between 1956 and 1979. The vessel entered service later in 1998, replacing the smaller Beaumont Hamel as the principal summer ferry on the Fogo Island and Change Islands route.

The newly built Veteran was intended to replace Capt. Earl W. Winsor in 2015, although problems with the new vessel required the older ferry to return to regular and relief service during 2016. On 8 February 2016, a dump truck carrying sand and salt went overboard while vehicles were being unloaded at Change Islands. The driver escaped from the truck and was pulled onto the wharf. The ferry was temporarily removed from service while its ramp was repaired.

=== Springdale lay-up ===
The province sold the inactive ferry to a private buyer in 2018. She was subsequently towed to a private wharf in Springdale and remained laid up there. In January 2024, the Canadian Coast Guard responded after the vessel developed a list. Inspectors found flooding in two compartments and placed a containment boom around the hull as a precaution, although an aerial survey found no visible pollution at the time.

A federal tender issued in 2025 stated that the flooding had followed the failure of an overboard-discharge pipe and that approximately 1,000 m^{3} (35,000 cu ft) of contaminated water had been removed from the vessel. The Coast Guard returned in December 2024 to remove bulk oil pollutants.

In November 2025, Fisheries and Oceans Canada issued a request for proposals to dismantle and recycle the ferry or prepare her for towing to an approved recycling facility. A contract was later awarded, and preparatory work related to the planned removal was reported in June 2026.
