= MV Confederation =

Ferry operating between Prince Edward Island and Nova Scotia, Canada

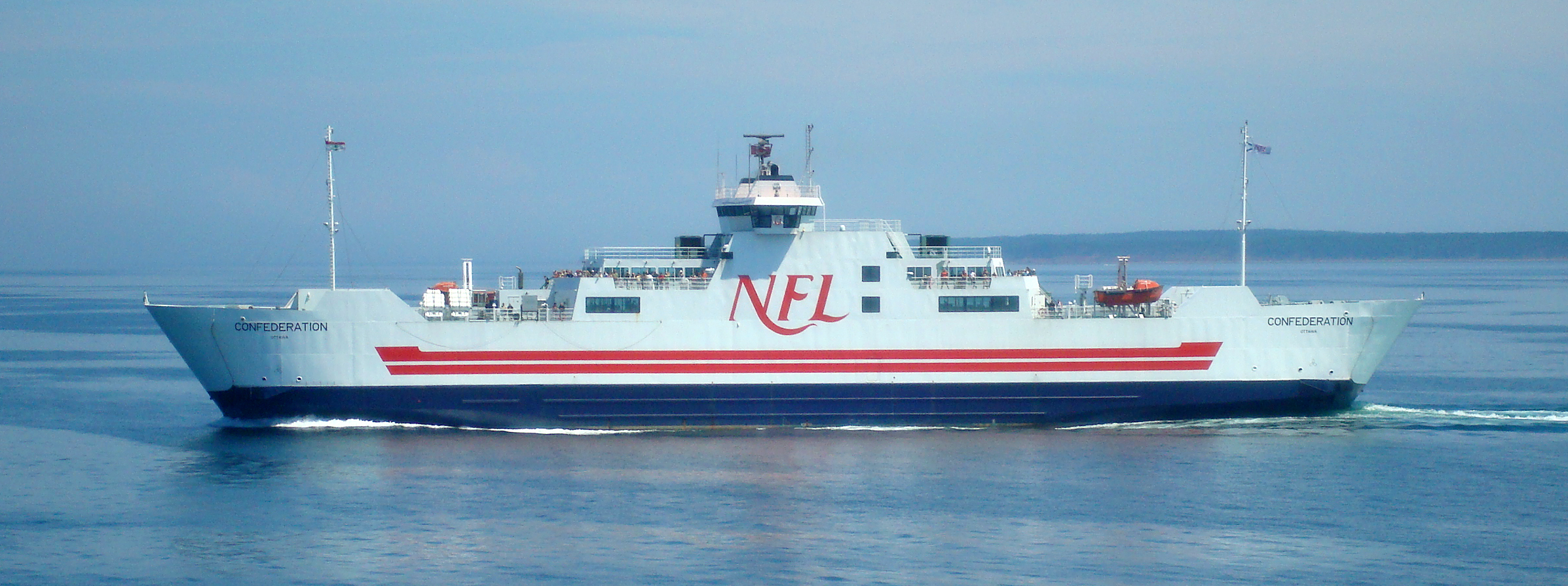
MV Confederation in 2008

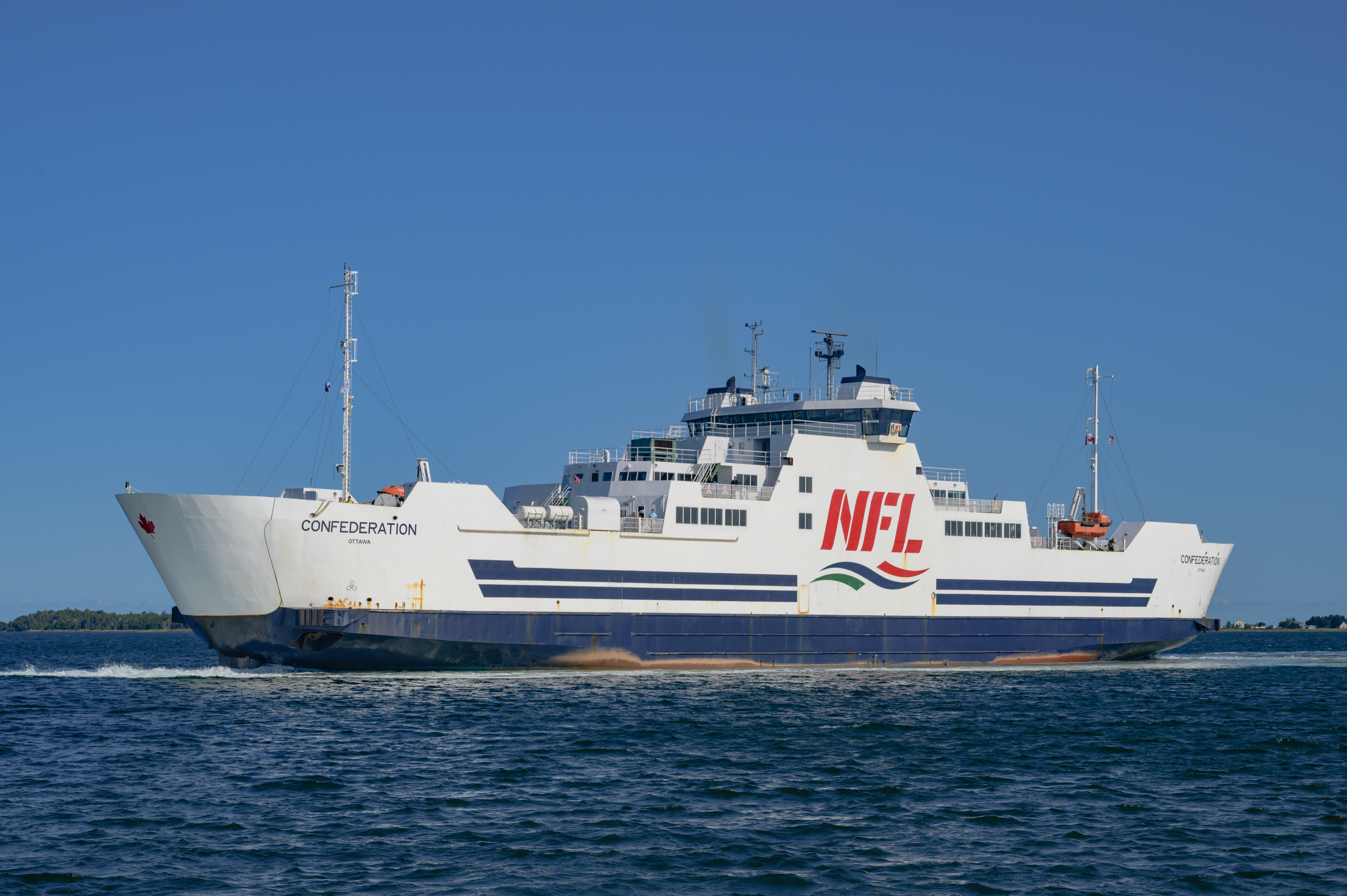
MV Confederation in 2022 in her new livery

MV Confederation is a double-ended RORO ferry which operates on a seasonal basis between Caribou, Nova Scotia and Wood Islands, Prince Edward Island from May to December. It is operated by Northumberland Ferries Limited (NFL). Built by Pictou Industries Limited for NFL and launched at Pictou, Nova Scotia, in 1993. Confederation has a total length of 114.2 metres (374 ft 8 in), beam of 18.77 m (61 ft 7 in), a draught of 4.439 m (14 ft 6.8 in) and a gross tonnage of 8,060. Her passenger capacity is 600 with a vehicle capacity of 220.

== Background ==
As early as 1985, increased tourist traffic prompted talks of introducing a strategy to address capacity issues, as the facilities at Caribou and Wood Islands were operating well beyond capacity with vehicle lineups sometimes stretching several kilometres on either side of the route. By November 1991, a contract was signed between the federal government and Pictou Industries to locally construct a new high-capacity ferry specifically designed for the route, with the anticipation of a second identical vessel eventually entering service. Both Caribou and Wood Islands terminals received major upgrades to accommodate the proposed vessels almost immediately in order to be completed by the maiden voyage of the new ferry.

== Construction and career ==
Construction of what would become known as Confederation began in February 1992 with a scheduled completion of July 1993. Based on a Norwegian concept, the ferry was to be double-ended due to the inability of a vessel of its size to turn around in both harbours, and she was to have an ice-strengthened bow. By the 1993 tourist season, it became clear that the vessel would not be completed on schedule due to technical issues with safety equipment and issues with docking infrastructure. Confederation was officially completed on October 28, 1993 at a price tag of $45 million and nearly four months behind schedule.

Confederation officially entered service on November 1, 1993, replacing two smaller ferries, the previous MV Confederation (1962) and MV Lord Selkirk (1958). In light of the announcement of the fixed link to Prince Edward Island around the same time of her introduction, plans to construct a sister ship were no longer considered viable due to a predicted reduction of traffic in the following years, leaving Confederation as a completely unique vessel.

In 2015, the original logos of Northumberland Ferries were removed from her hull and replaced with a redesigned logo, as well as the stripes running the length of her being repainted blue from their original red appearance.

In 2016, the other vessel on the route, MV Holiday Island was out of service for an extended length of time undergoing major repairs and overhaul leaving Confederation alone on the ferry route for the prime summer months. Despite additional crossings scheduled for the vessel, local residents, the hospitality industry as a whole and commercial truckers protested as business suffered due to the reduction in service. Confederation was also out of service from 29 September to 2 October that year due to an electrical problem.

In September 2024, Confederation collided with her berth at Wood Islands. While a mechanical issue was initially suspected as the cause, NFL later confirmed that was not the case. The collision damaged Confederation's bow visor heavily, resulting in the need to turn the vessel and all vehicles having to be backed off. Confederation returned to service in early December 2024.
