= Rivière-du-Loup-Saint-Siméon Ferry =

Ferry

Rivière-du-Loup–Saint-Siméon Ferry
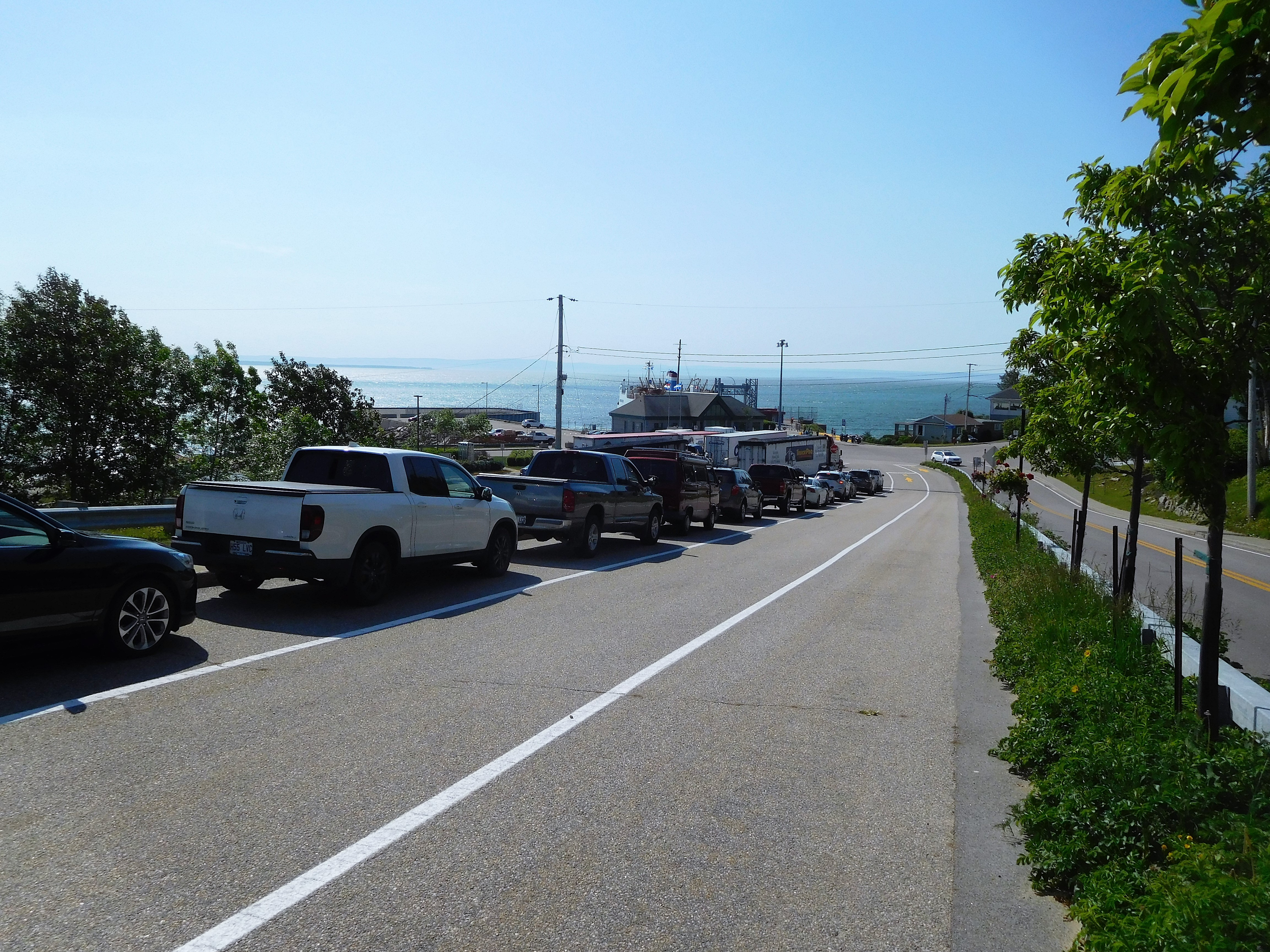
- Saint-Siméon terminal
- Locale: Saint Lawrence River, Quebec, Canada
- Waterway: Saint Lawrence River
- Transit type: Passenger and vehicle ferry
- Owner: Société des traversiers du Québec
- Operator: La Traverse Rivière-du-Loup–Saint-Siméon Ltée
- Began operation: 1909
- No. of lines: 1
- No. of vessels: 1 (Trans-St-Laurent)
- No. of terminals: 2 (Rivière-du-Loup, Saint-Siméon)
- Yearly ridership: 82,629 passengers (2020-2021)
- Website: Official website

The Rivière-du-Loup–Saint-Siméon ferry service operates across the Saint Lawrence River in Quebec, connecting the Bas-Saint-Laurent and Charlevoix regions. It is managed in partnership by La Traverse Rivière-du-Loup–Saint-Siméon Ltée and the Société des traversiers du Québec (STQ), which handles the terminal infrastructures. The crossing provides a crucial link for both tourists and local residents.

== History ==
The origins of this ferry route date back to 1909 when the Trans-Saint-Laurent Company was founded by Malcolm Fraser, the mayor of Fraserville (now Rivière-du-Loup), and J.-Camille Pouliot. The first ship, the SS Contest, began service on June 24, 1909, connecting Rivière-du-Loup with Saint-Siméon and other municipalities on the north shore. Over the years, the ferry service expanded with new vessels such as the SS Mahone and the SS Rhoda. In 1940, the service was officially named La Traverse Rivière-du-Loup–Saint-Siméon Ltée, after the company ceased operations to Tadoussac.

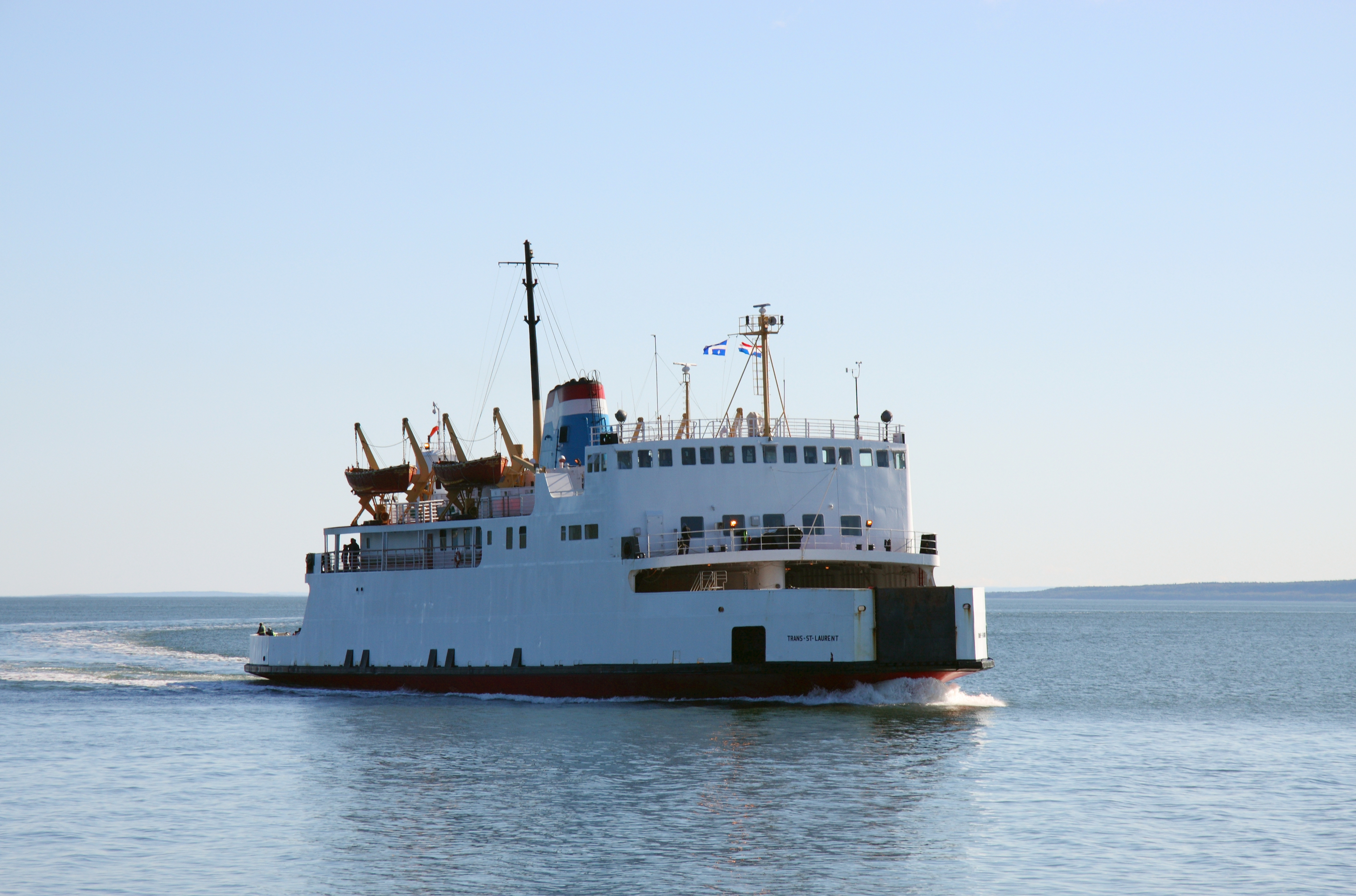
Trans-Saint-Laurent

In 1963, the ferry Trans-St-Laurent was introduced to accommodate growing demand, capable of transporting 100 vehicles and 380 passengers per trip. The ferry remains in service.

== Operations ==
The ferry covers a distance of 27 kilometres (17 mi), with an average crossing time of 65 minutes. It operates seasonally from April to January and is designated as an essential service by the government of Quebec. The ferry crosses the Saint Lawrence River, often offering passengers views of marine wildlife, including whales.

== Modern developments ==
In 1993, the ferry terminal infrastructure came under the jurisdiction of the Société des traversiers du Québec, which now manages both terminals at Rivière-du-Loup and Saint-Siméon. The ferry service has seen multiple upgrades over the years, including dock renovations in 2010 and the construction of new facilities in 2011 to improve safety and efficiency. Recent years have also seen efforts to minimize the environmental impact of ferry operations, especially in areas affecting local whale populations.

== Significance ==
The ferry service plays a vital role in regional tourism, linking the mountainous landscapes of Charlevoix with the scenic Bas-Saint-Laurent. By ferry, the crossing spans 27 kilometres and takes about 65 minutes, providing a much shorter and faster route compared to the 391-kilometre (243 mi) drive on land, which can take up to five hours. The ferry offers a convenient route for tourists exploring both sides of the river, as well as a necessary passage for local residents. Each year, the ferry transports thousands of vehicles and passengers, contributing to the local economies of both regions.

== Potential relocation debate ==
In recent years, discussions have emerged about relocating the Rivière-du-Loup–Saint-Siméon ferry to Gros-Cacouna due to significant cost differences. Studies from the Société des traversiers du Québec (STQ) indicate that maintaining the current terminal at Rivière-du-Loup could cost up to 700 million CAD, more than double the cost of relocating to Gros-Cacouna, where dredging would be less frequent.

Mayor Mario Bastille of Rivière-du-Loup opposes the move due to economic and logistical concerns. In addition, many residents have mobilized to keep the ferry in Rivière-du-Loup, viewing it as essential to the community's identity and economy. A petition was launched, highlighting the ferry's historical and cultural significance, with the region relying on it for nearly 115 years. Environmental groups have also voiced concerns about Gros-Cacouna’s proximity to a beluga whale habitat, fearing the impact of increased maritime traffic and noise pollution.

The ferry service will continue to operate from Rivière-du-Loup until January 2028. The STQ extended its contract with Clarke, ensuring operations until the end of the 2027 season. However, the Québec government has yet to decide whether the ferry's long-term port will remain in Rivière-du-Loup or move to Cacouna, with both locations facing logistical challenges, including dredging in Rivière-du-Loup and the need for new infrastructure in Cacouna.
