= Northumberland Ferries Limited =

Canadian operator of ferries

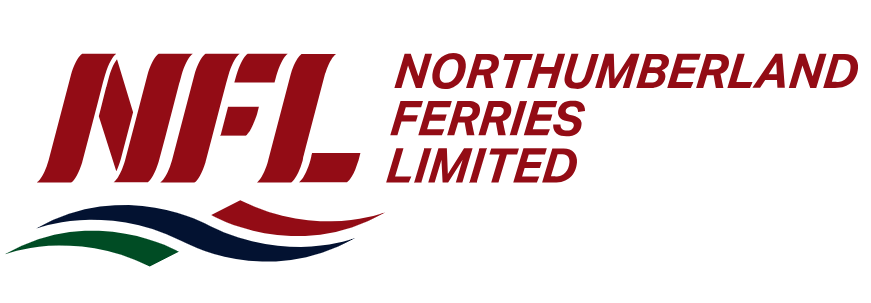
- Industry: Shipping
- Founded: 1941
- Headquarters: Charlottetown, Prince Edward Island
- Area served: Northumberland Strait
- Key people: Mark Wilson, owner, President & CEO
- Services: Passenger transportation Freight transportation
- Website: www.ferries.ca

Northumberland Ferries Limited (NFL) is a ferry company operating in eastern Canada and headquartered in Charlottetown, Prince Edward Island. NFL is also the owner of subsidiary Bay Ferries Limited (which used to include the Bay Ferries Great Lakes brand) through its holding company.

== Wood Islands–Caribou Ferry ==
NFL has operated the ferry service that carries the Trans-Canada Highway across the eastern part of the Northumberland Strait between Wood Islands, Prince Edward Island, and Caribou, Nova Scotia, since it was established in 1941 by the Government of Canada. This service is seasonal and operates only between May and December on account of heavy sea ice and the lack of icebreaking ferries. NFL also operates the ferry terminals in Wood Islands and Caribou, both of which are owned by the Government of Canada.

Until 2022, NFL operated two vessels owned by the Government of Canada: MV Confederation, built in 1993, and MV Holiday Island, built in 1971. On July 22, 2022, Holiday Island suffered a fire, causing ferry crossings to be cancelled. The MV Saaremaa 1 was loaned by the Société des traversiers du Québec as a temporary replacement, and began operations on August 20, 2022, and returned for the 2023 and 2024 season. While Confederation has been operated exclusively by NFL since she was built, Holiday Island joined NFL in 1997 after being declared surplus by previous operator Marine Atlantic (who operated the vessel between Cape Tormentine, New Brunswick, and Borden-Carleton, Prince Edward Island) upon completion of the Confederation Bridge. Following the 2022 fire, Holiday Island was declared by Transport Canada to be beyond repair and would be scrapped. The federal government purchased the Norwegian ferry MV Fanafjord (built 2008) in 2023; the replacement ferry arrived in Pictou on January 26, 2025, and now bears the name MV Northumberland. A brand new ferry is expected to be delivered in 2028.

Fares are paid only when exiting Prince Edward Island. The other major crossing of the Northumberland Strait, the Confederation Bridge from Prince Edward Island to New Brunswick, does likewise. Therefore, travellers entering the island on the ferry and exiting on the bridge or vice versa need pay for only one of the links.

The route has long been subsidized by Transport Canada; under the Ferry Services Contribution Program, the subsidy was most recently extended to 2027.

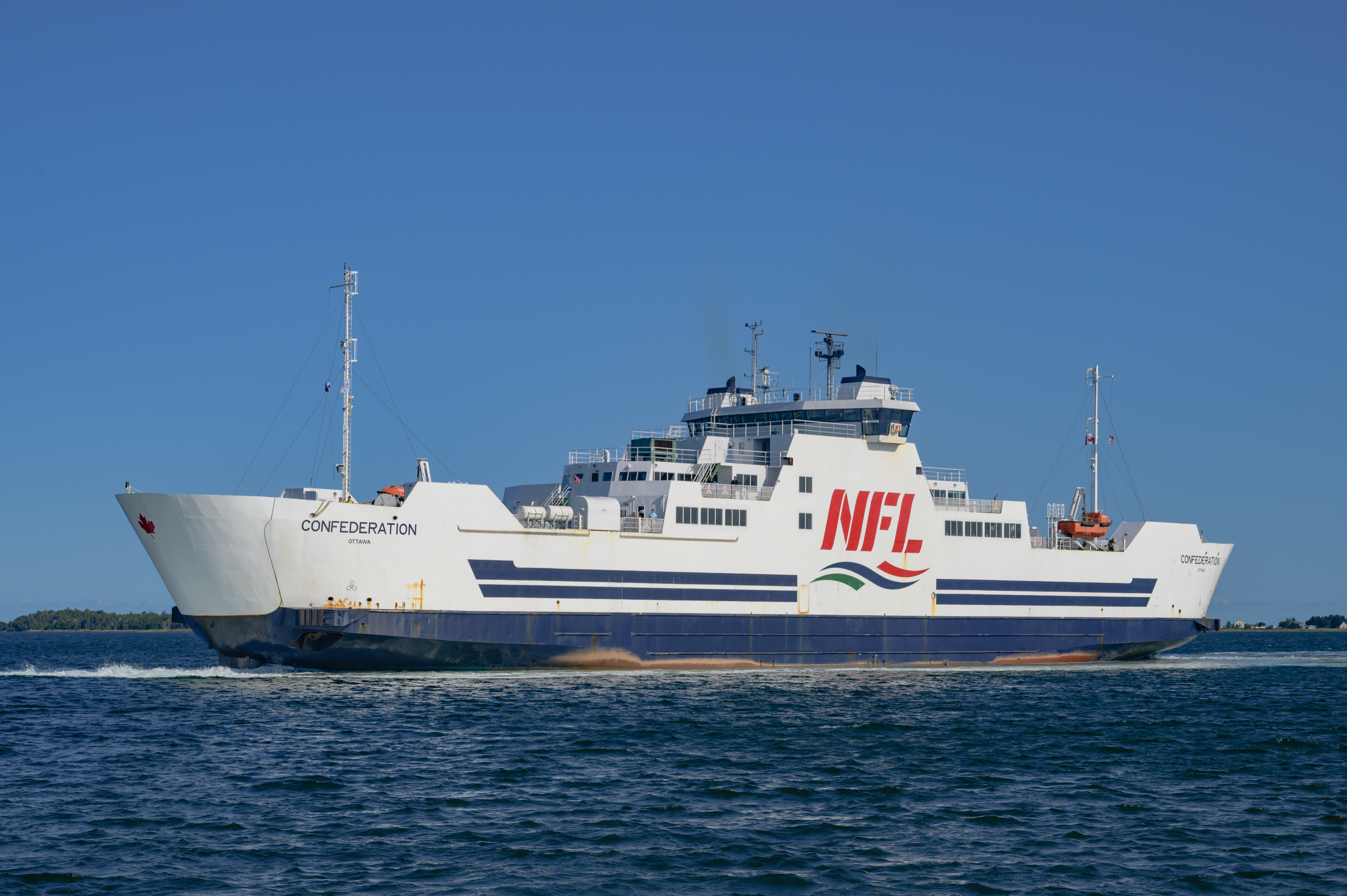
MV Confederation has been operated by NFL on the Northumberland Strait between Caribou and Wood Islands since 1993.

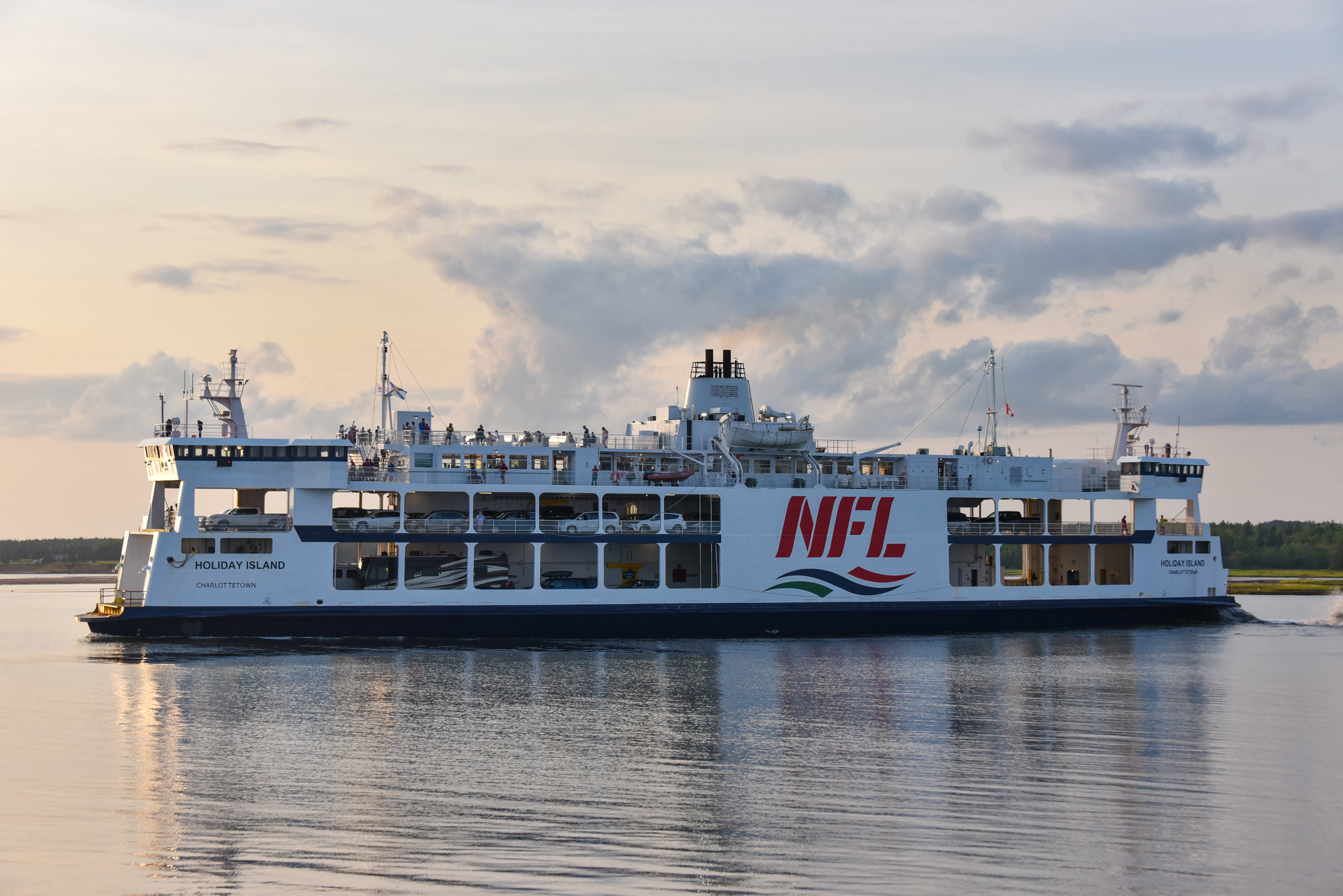
MV Holiday Island in the Northumberland Strait after leaving Wood Islands terminal.

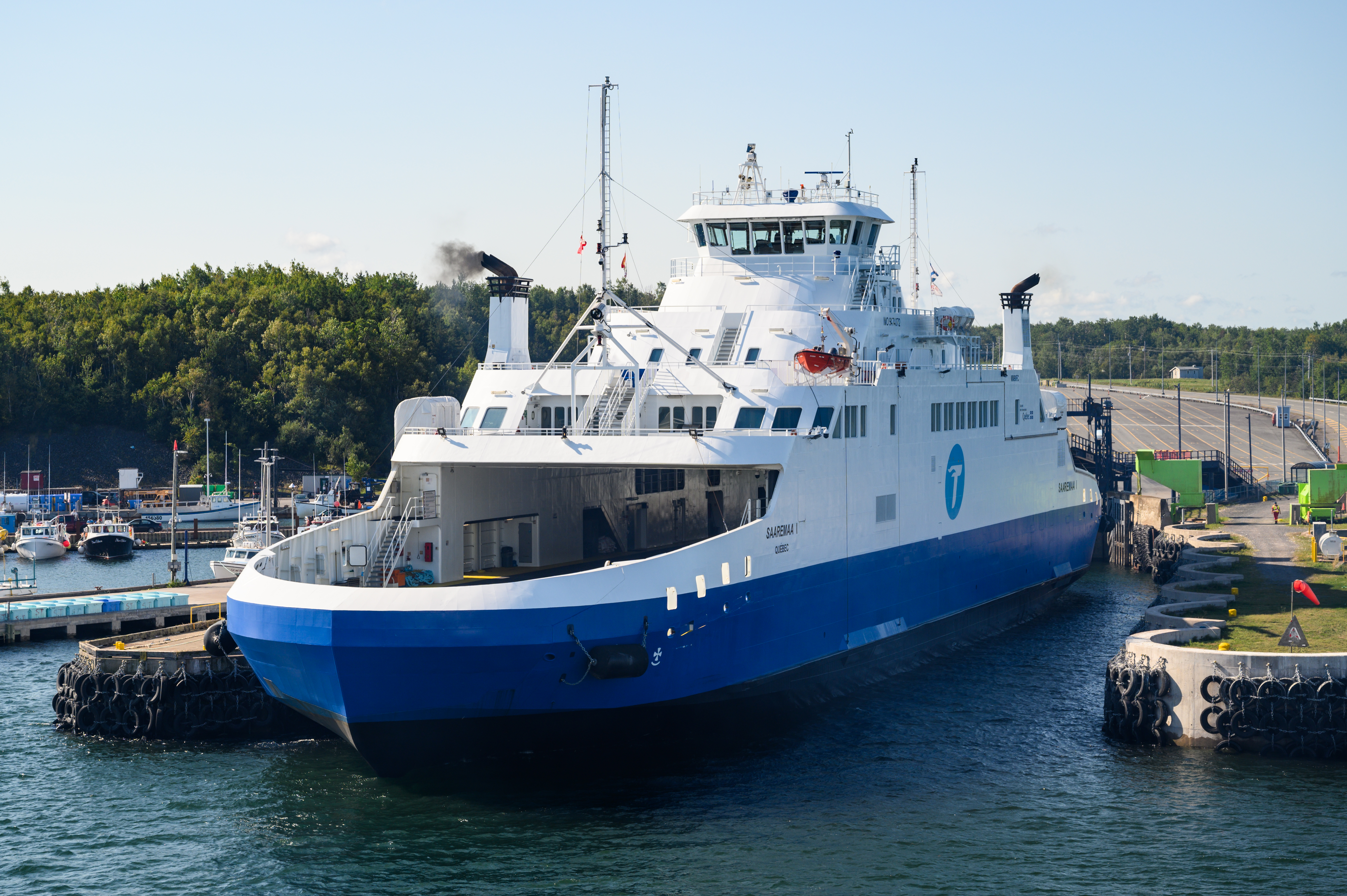
MV Saaremaa I preparing to leave the Northumberland Ferries terminal at Caribou, Nova Scotia.

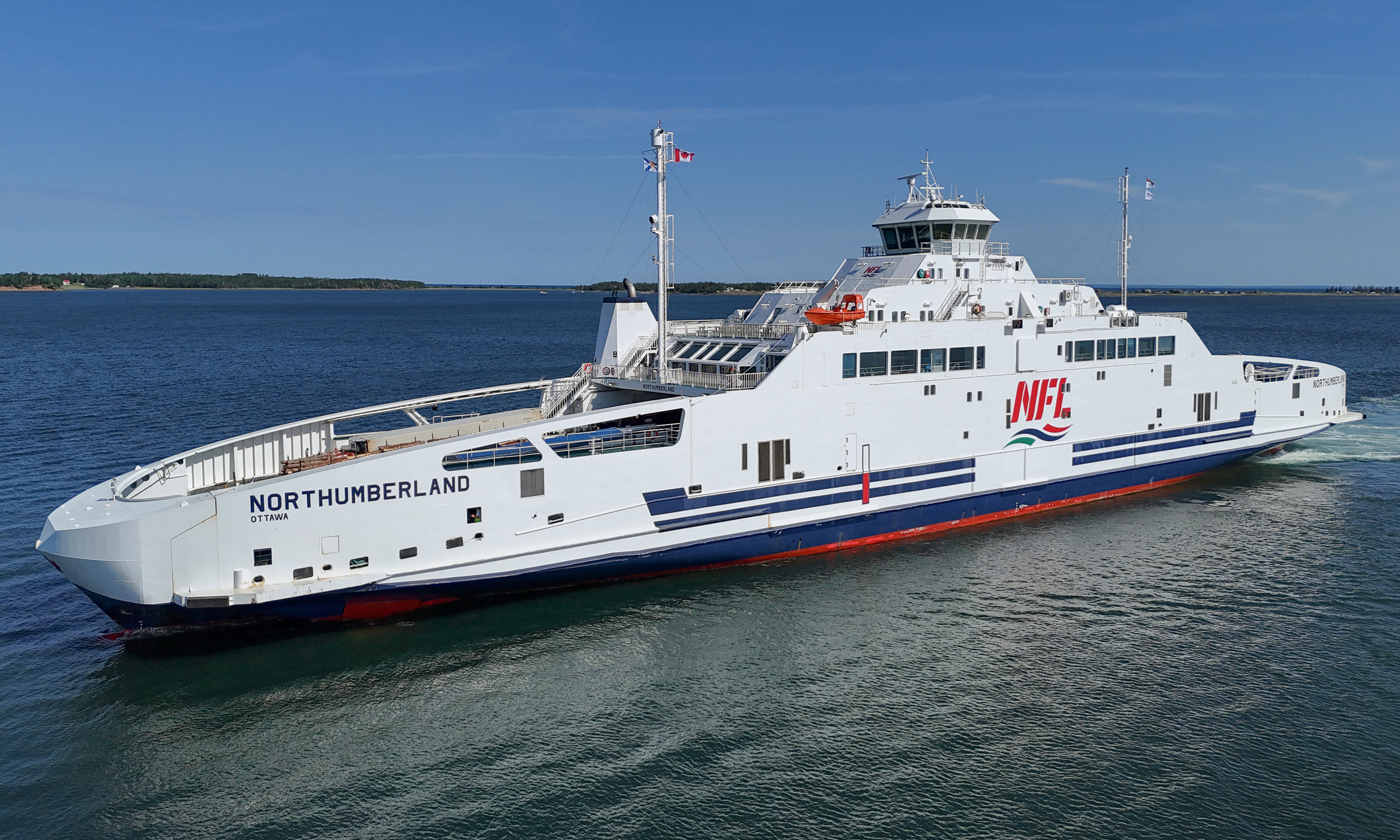
MV Northumberland entering Caribou.

== Terminals ==
=== Caribou ===
This terminal serves Nova Scotia, and is located at the North end of Highway 106, a spur route of the Trans-Canada Highway. The terminal was constructed following the formation of Northumberland Ferries in 1941, and has received numerous upgrades since its construction. At the time of opening, the ferry was only accessible via Three Brooks Road. During the Canada-wide construction of the Trans-Canada Highway in the 1960s, Highway 106 was built providing the service with direct access to the national highway network. At this time, the terminal was expanded to handle more vehicle traffic due to the opening of the highway. A new terminal building was constructed in the early 1970s, and is still used today. The terminal also received a major upgrade including new docking infrastructure, terminal renovations, vehicle lanes and parking prior to the 1993 introduction of the high capacity MV Confederation, which is significantly larger than the other ferries running at the time.

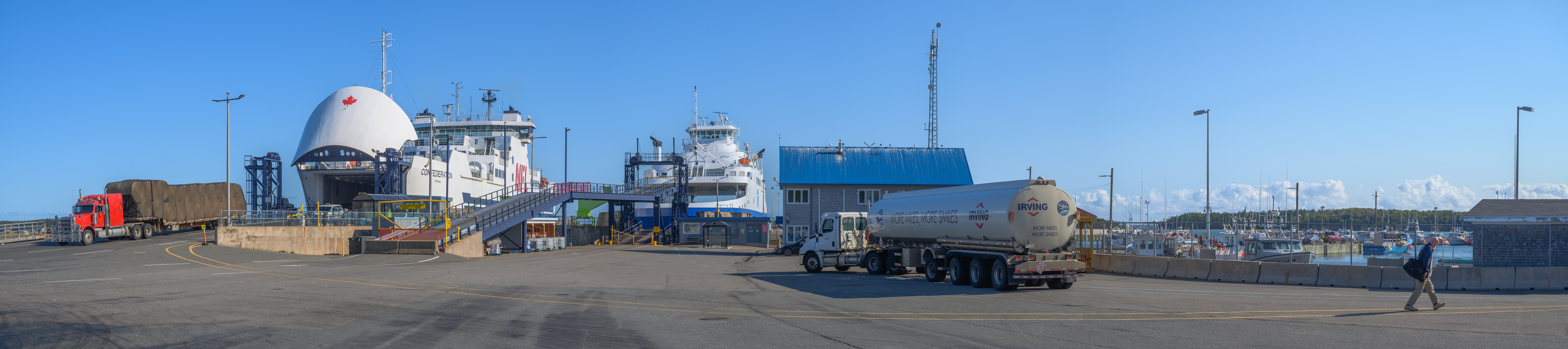
Northumberland Ferries terminal at Caribou, Nova Scotia, Canada

=== Wood Islands ===
This terminal serves Prince Edward Island, and is located at the east end of Route 1, the Trans Canada Highway, and is adjacent to Wood Islands Provincial Park. Like the Caribou terminal, it was constructed following the formation of Northumberland ferries in 1941. During the early 1990s, the terminal received a major upgrade, including a completely new terminal building and docking infrastructure to accommodate MV Confederation. The terminal building received renovations in 2017 which saw the interior modernized, and includes televisions and new seating areas. The previous terminal still stands today, located on the opposite side of the vehicle lanes from the current terminal, and is used for storage.

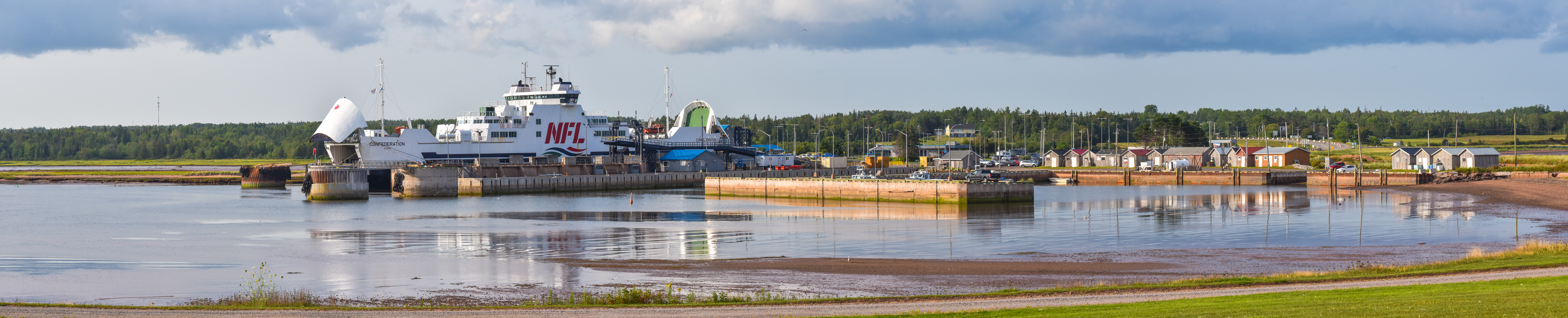
Northumberland Ferries terminal at Wood Islands PEI Canada

== Historical fleet ==
Name	Dates	History
MV Prince Nova	1941–1958	Formerly MV Erie Isle when she operated on Lake Erie from Leamington, Ontario to Pelee Island. She was purchased by NFL and entered service in 1941, serving until 1958 with arrival of MV Lord Selkirk. Laid up in Pictou, where she caught fire and burnt at wharf later that year. Scrapped on site.
SS Charles A. Dunning	1941, 1946–1964	Formerly SS Sankaty when she operated in Massachusetts and Maine. She was purchased by NFL but before entering service was requisitioned for service in the Royal Canadian Navy for minelaying duty as HMCS Sankaty. Returned to NFL in 1946, serving until 1964 with arrival of MV Prince Nova. Sold for scrap but sank en route to Sydney.
MV Lord Selkirk	1958–1993	Built for Government of Canada by Ferguson Industries, Pictou in 1958, serving until 1993 with arrival of MV Confederation. Sold to company in Panama. Used in Chiriquí Grande in Panama until the road was built. Lying at anchor at Chiriquí Grande in poor condition (July 2014).
MV Confederation	1975–1993	Built for Government of Canada by Halifax Shipyards, Halifax in 1962 when she was operated by CN from Borden, Prince Edward Island to Cape Tormentine, New Brunswick. Still owned by Government of Canada, she was transferred in 1975 to NFL from CN, serving until 1993 with arrival of MV Confederation. Sold in 1994 to shipping line Groupe Desgagnés, Quebec, refitted and renamed Nordik Passeur for service from Rivière-au-Renard, Quebec to Havre St. Pierre, Quebec via Anticosti Island. Mothballed in 1997, she was scrapped in Turkey in 2007.
MV Prince Nova	1963–1997	Built for Government of Canada by Ferguson Industries, Pictou in 1963, serving until 1997 with arrival of MV Holiday Island. Sold to Cross Sound Ferry, New London in 1998, refitted and renamed the MV Susan Anne for service across Long Island Sound. Currently operating.
MV Prince Edward	1972–1997	Built for the Government of Canada by Ferguson Industries, Pictou in 1972, serving until 1997 with arrival of MV Holiday Island. Sold to Government of Newfoundland and Labrador in 1997, refitted and renamed the MV Capt. Earl W. Winsor for service to Fogo Island and the Change Islands. Currently not operating and laid up in Springdale.
MV Confederation	1993-present	Built by Pictou Industries Limited for NFL and launched in Pictou, NS in 1993 it replaced the previous MV Confederation. It has a capacity of 600 passengers and 220 vehicles.
MV Holiday Island	1997-2022	Built for the Government of Canada by Port Weller Dry Docks in St. Catherines, Ontario it was completed in 1971 and served the Northumberland Strait crossing between Cape Tormentine, NB and Port Borden, PE until 1997. Originally named William Pope it was later renamed Holiday Island. With the opening of the Confederation Bridge in 1997 it was sold by Marine Atlantic to the Government of Canada and began operation with NFL between the ports of Wood Islands, PE and Caribou, NS to replace the MV Prince Nova and MV Prince Edward. It operated until 2022 when a fire in the engine room took it out of service and was scrapped in 2023. It had a capacity of 399 passengers and 155 vehichles.
MV Northumberland	2025-present	
