= Fogo Island =

Fogo Island may refer to:

- Fogo Island, Newfoundland and Labrador, an island and town in Canada
- Fogo, Cape Verde

== See also ==
- Fire Island (disambiguation)
- Isla del Fuego
