= HMCS Whitethroat =

History

Canada
- Name: Whitethroat
- Builder: Cook, Welton & Gemmell Ltd., Beverley, Yorkshire
- Yard number: 736
- Laid down: 15 May 1944
- Launched: 6 September 1944
- Commissioned: 7 December 1944
- Decommissioned: 6 May 1946
- Recommissioned: April 1951
- Decommissioned: 30 September 1954
- Reclassified: CNAV 1946 and 1954
- Fate: Broken up 1967

General characteristics
- Class & type: Isles-class naval trawler/minelayer
- Displacement: 580 long tons (590 t) standard; 790 long tons (800 t) full load
- Length: 164 feet (50.0 m) oa; 150 feet (45.7 m) pp
- Beam: 27 1/2 feet (8.4 m)
- Draught: 12 1/2 feet (3.8 m)
- Propulsion: Triple expansion engine; 850 ihp (630 kW)
- Speed: 12.5 knots (23.2 km/h; 14.4 mph)

HMCS Whitethroat was a controlled minelayer based on the Isles-class naval trawler constructed for Canada in the United Kingdom during World War II. The ship was completed near the end of the war and most of its naval service was spent dismantling the defences erected during the war. In 1946 the ship was paid off and became a naval auxiliary and given the new prefix CNAV Whitethroat. As an auxiliary, Whitethroat was used a naval research platform and to repair undersea cables. Reactivated for the Korean War as a minelayer again, the vessel returned to auxiliary service on the Pacific Coast from 1954 to 1967. Whitethroat was sold for scrap in 1967.

== Description ==
Whitethroat was built as a controlled minelayer based on the Isles-class naval trawler design. The ship had a standard displacement of 580 long tons (590 t) and 790 long tons (800 t) at full load. The vessel measured 164 feet (50.0 m) long overall and 150 feet (45.7 m) between perpendiculars with a beam of 27 1/2 feet (8.4 m) and a draught of 12 1/2 feet (3.8 m). The ship was powered by steam provided by one cylindrical boiler to a triple expansion engine rated at 850 indicated horsepower (630 kW) with a maximum speed of 12.5 knots (23.2 km/h; 14.4 mph). The vessel was armed with either one 4-inch (102 mm) anti-aircraft gun or a 20 mm (0.79 in) cannon.

== Service history ==
During World War II, the Royal Canadian Navy (RCN) sought to provide the port of Halifax, Nova Scotia with a defence of controlled minefields. Their solution was to acquire Sankaty, a former Staten Island ferry and convert her to a minelayer. Towards the end of the war, the RCN sought to replace the older ship which had never been entirely suitable for the role with one of modern design. Whitethroat was built by Cook, Welton & Gemmell Ltd. at their yard in Beverley, East Yorkshire and was laid down on 15 May 1944 with the yard number 736. The ship was launched on 6 September 1944. The ship was commissioned at Beverley on 7 December 1944 and completed on 12 December. Whitethroat sailed to Canada as part of the convoy ONS 42 in February 1945. Upon arrival, the ship replaced Sankaty and took part in the dismantling of harbour defences following the end of the war. This took until 6 May 1946 when the ship was paid off as a warship from the RCN and made an auxiliary ship, with the prefix Canadian Naval Auxiliary Vessel (CNAV) with the hull number NPC 113 and then AGH 113.

As an auxiliary vessel, Whitethroat was used to repair undersea telegraph cables and in 1950, served as a platform for oceanographic work for the Naval Research Establishment. With the onset of the Korean War Whitethroat was activated as a warship and given the prefix HMCS again in April 1951 at Halifax. Once again a mine and loop layer, Whitethroat remained in this service until 30 September 1954 when the ship was paid off and returned to being a CNAV after the arrival of HMCS Bluethroat. In March 1955, Whitethroat sailed west to join the Pacific Naval Laboratory, of which the vessel remained a part of until 1967. There the ship was used as a research test bed along with planting the practice mines for the Canadian minesweepers. The ship was sold for scrap and broken up at Vancouver, British Columbia in November 1967.
