= Société des traversiers du Québec =

Ferry company in Québec, Canada

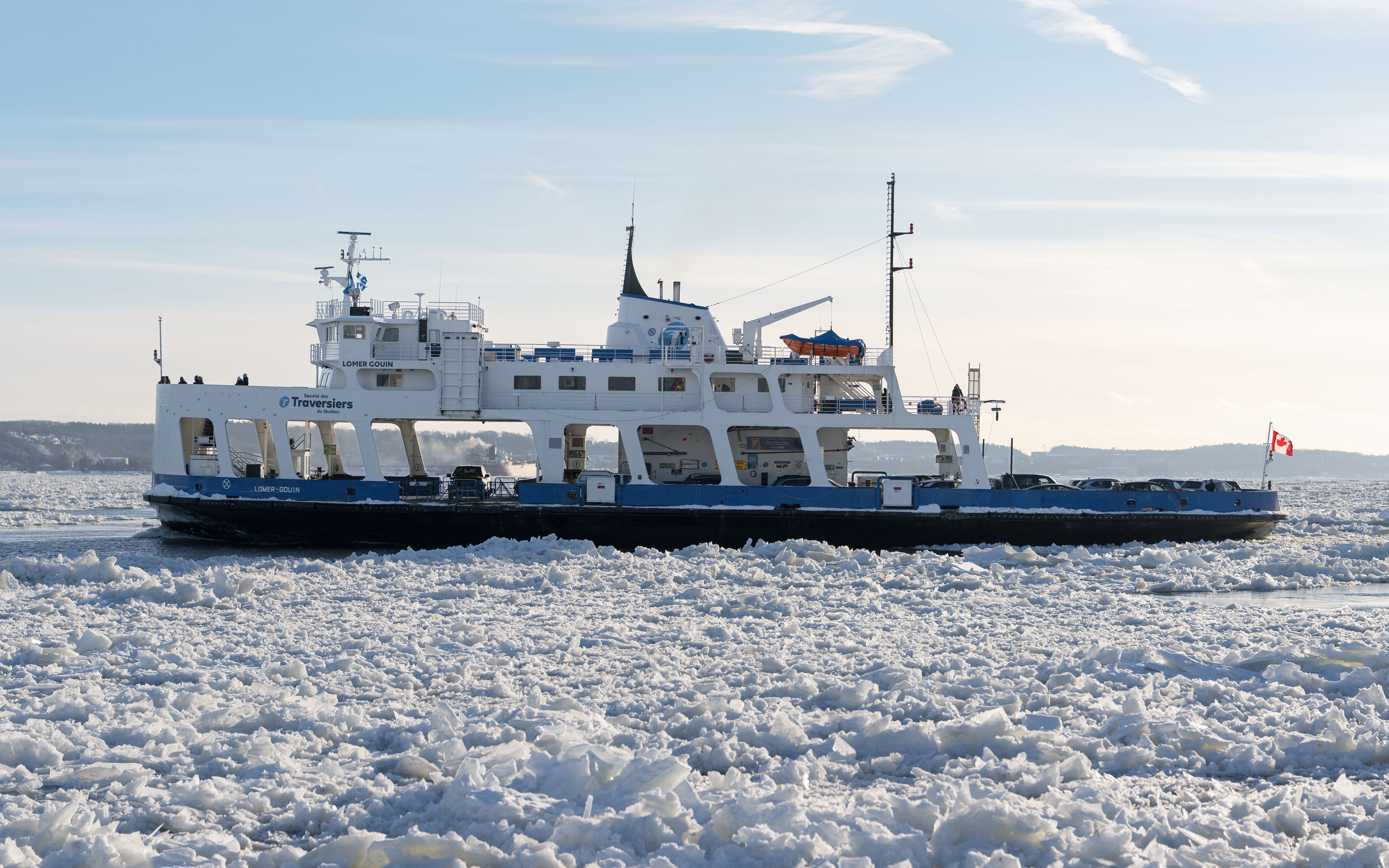
The ferry Lomer-Gouin crossing the St. Lawrence River between Quebec and Lévis in 2026

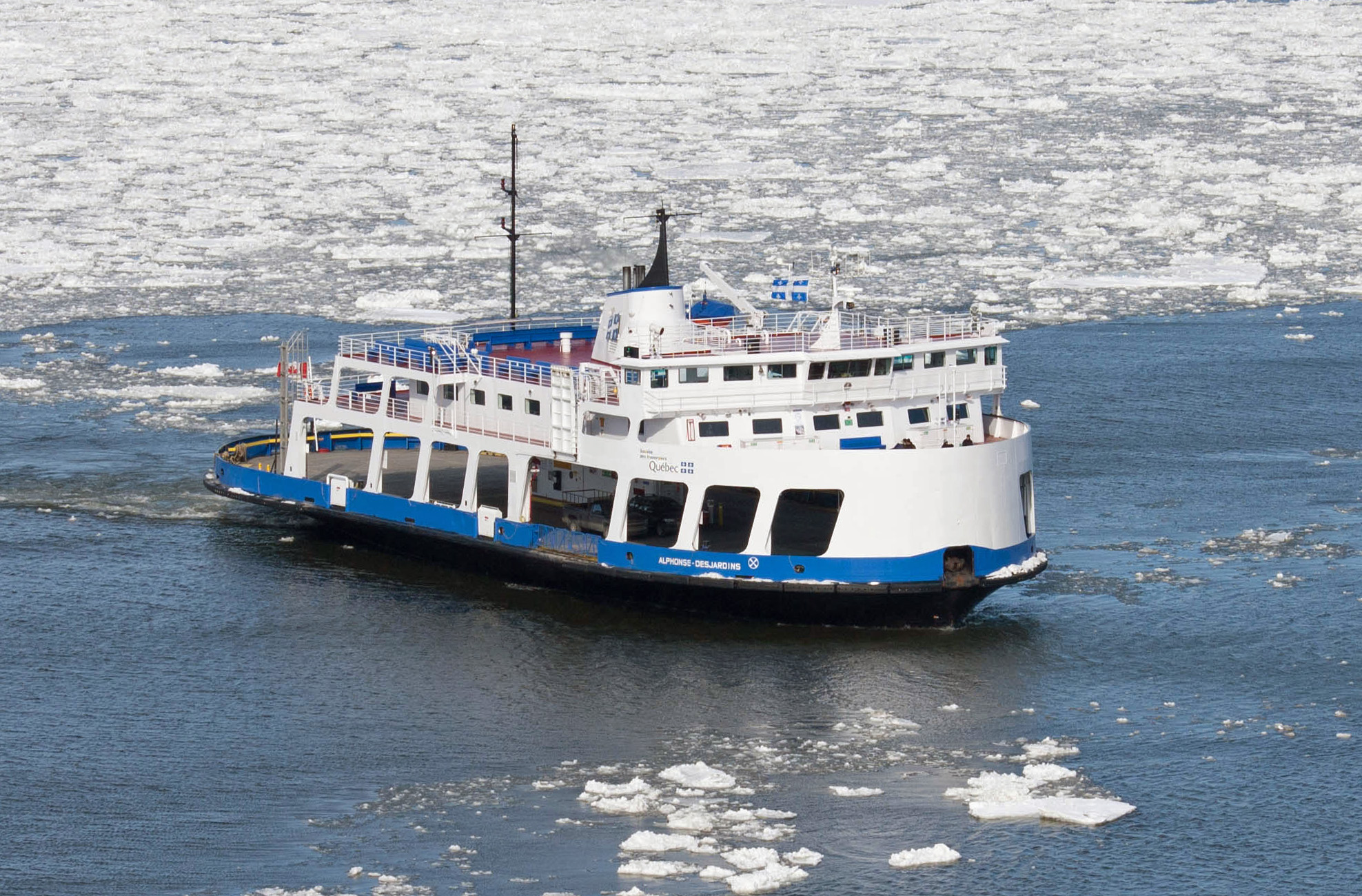
The ferry Alphonse-Desjardins operating between Quebec City, Quebec and Lévis on the St. Lawrence River

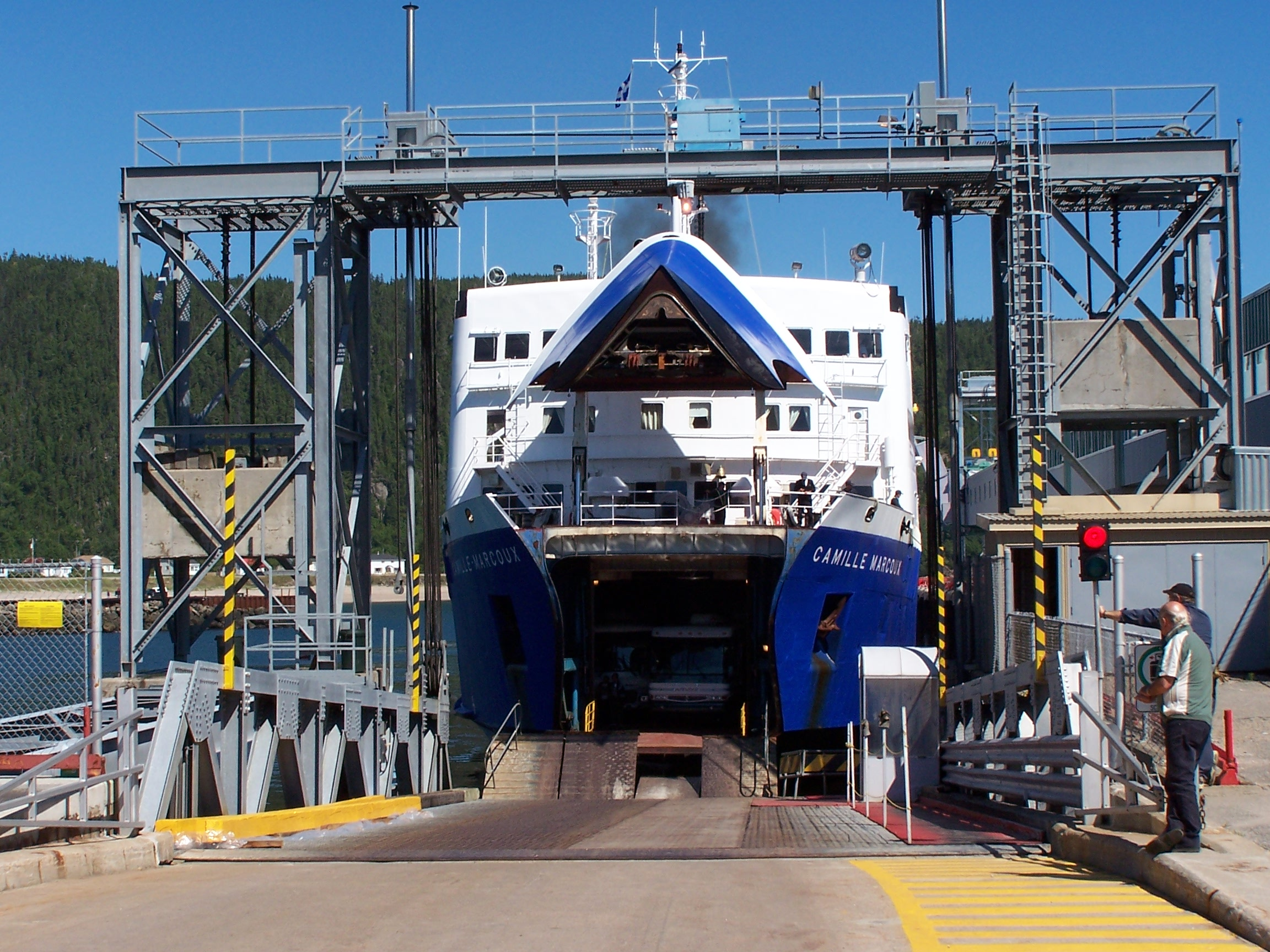
The ferry Camille-Marcoux at dock

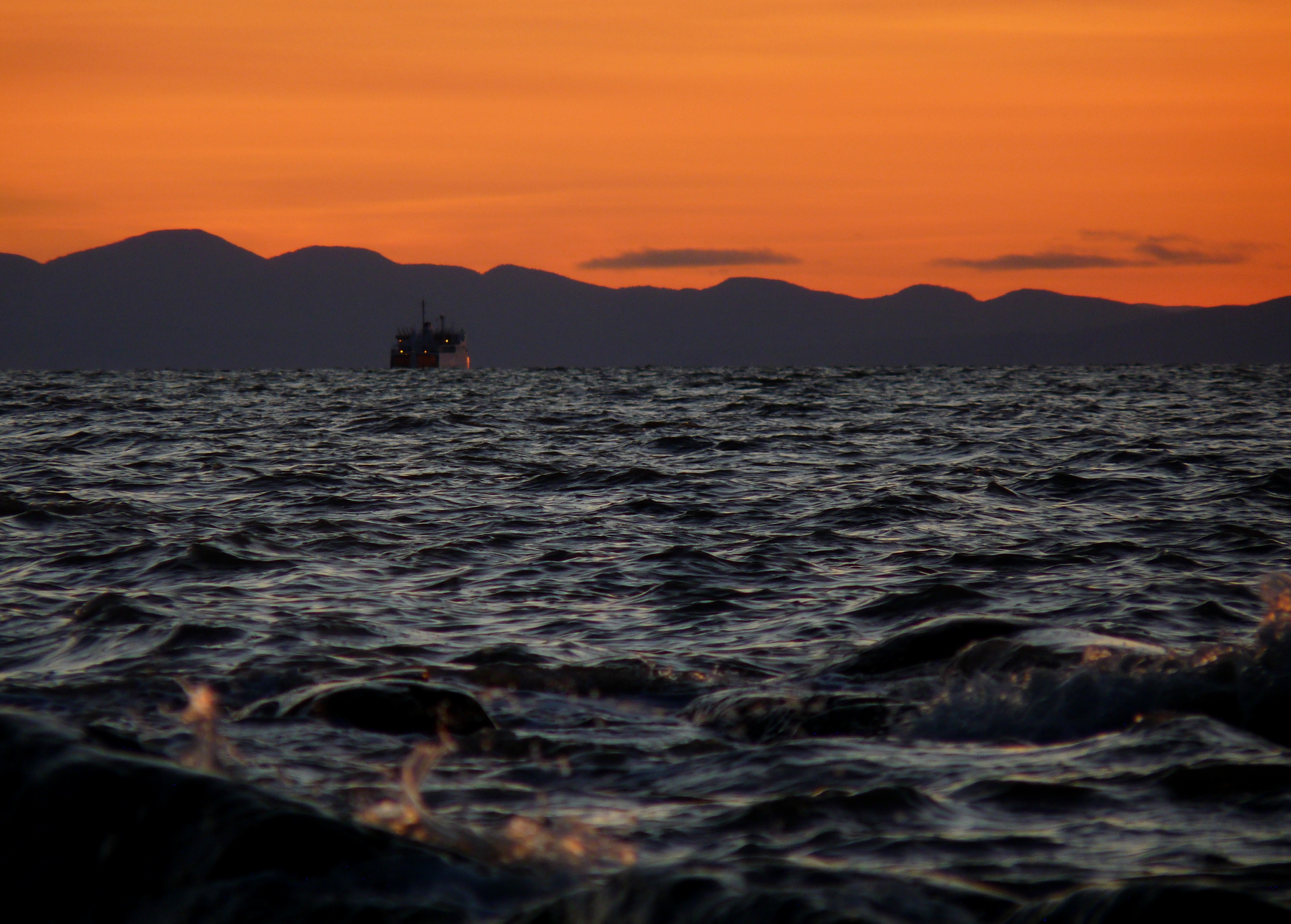
The ferry Trans-St-Laurent between Rivière-du-Loup and Saint-Siméon

The Société des traversiers du Québec (STQ) is a ferry company which has operated some intra-provincial ferry services in Quebec since 1971. It is a crown corporation owned by the Government of Quebec.

STQ operates the following services:

- Saint-Ignace-de-Loyola to Sorel-Tracy, crossing the St. Lawrence River with three ships, the Catherine-Legardeur and the former twins Armand-Imbeau and jos-Deschênes now called Alexandrina-Chalifoux and Didace-Guévremont
- Lévis to Quebec City, crossing the St. Lawrence River with two twin vessels, Alphonse-Desjardins and Lomer-Gouin.
- Tadoussac to Baie-Sainte-Catherine, crossing the Saguenay River with three ships, the Armand-Imbeau II and the Jos-Deschênes II all year long. The two are the first ferries powered by liquified natural gas that been constructed in North America by Davie Shipbuilding.
- Matane to Baie-Comeau and Godbout, crossing the St. Lawrence River with one ship, the Saaremaa I, which replaced the F.-A.-Gauthier, when that ferry was taken out of service due to engine issues. The MV F.-A.-Gauthier had replaced Camille-Marcoux in 2015. The F.-A.-Gauthier is the first ferry in North American service powered by liquified natural gas.
- L'Isle-aux-Coudres to Les Éboulements, crossing the St. Lawrence River with two vessels, the Joseph-Savard and the Radisson.
- Chevery to Harrington Harbour, with Mécatina II.

The following services are operated in partnership with another company:

- Saint-Antoine-de-l'Isle-aux-Grues to Montmagny crossing the St. Lawrence River with one ship, the Grues-des-Îles
- Rivière-du-Loup to Saint-Siméon crossing the St. Lawrence River with one ship, the Trans-St-Laurent.
- Île-d'Entrée to Cap-aux-Meules connecting two islands of the Magdalen Islands with one vessel, the Ivan-Quinn, built in 2009.

the Félix-Antoine-Savard is the only polyvalent ferry capable of doing multiple service in the STQ, it is use for replacement of another ferry when has maintenance or for help in certain service like Tadoussac to Baie-Sainte-Catherine or L'Isle-aux-Coudres to Les Éboulements, it had been use when the F.-A.-Gauthier had broken down before the sale of the NM Apollo.

== New construction ==
On January 12, 2010, the corporation announced the signing of contracts for three new ferries. Concept Naval of Quebec City and STX Canada designed two ferries which would replace the existing ferries on the Tadoussac - Baie Sainte-Catherine route, the Armand-Imbeau and Jos-Deschênes. These ferries were under construction at Chantier Davie Canada in Lévis, Quebec. As of May 2018, the new ferries had not entered service and their projected cost had more than doubled the original estimate. One ferry was projected to enter service in Summer 2018 and the other in Fall 2018.

The company Navtech Deltamarin (a joint venture of Navtech and Deltamarin Group), also of Quebec City, contracted to build the ferry which replaced the Camille-Marcoux on the Matane – Baie-Comeau – Godbout route. This vessel was constructed by Italian shipbuilder Fincantieri. All three new ferries are to be powered by liquefied natural gas (LNG).

== See also ==
- Compagnie de gestion de Matane
- Roll-on/roll-off
