= Fire Island (disambiguation) =

Fire Island is a 32 mi (51 km) long barrier island off the southern shore of Long Island, New York.

Fire Island may also refer to:

== Places ==
- Fire Island (Aleutian Islands)
- Fire Island (Anchorage, Alaska)
- Ilha do Fogo, Mozambique (Portuguese for Fire Island)
- Green Island, Taiwan, known before 1949 as Fire Island or Bonfire Island
- Ognenny Ostrov (Russian for Fire Island), an island of Lake Novozero in Belozersky District, Vologda Oblast, Russia
- An island in the Isle Royale National Park, in Lake Superior

== Music ==
- "Fire Island", a song by the Village People from their 1977 self-titled album
- "Fire Island", a 1984 song by Scottish band Secession
- Fire Island (duo), an English house music duo
  - "Fire Island", a 1992 song by the duo
- "Fire Island", a song by Fountains of Wayne from their 2003 album Welcome Interstate Managers
- "Fire Island, AK", a song by The Long Winters from their 2006 album Putting the Days to Bed

== Other uses ==
- Fire Island (2022 film), a comedy film directed by Andrew Ahn
- Fire Island (2023 film), a horror film starring Connor Paolo
- Fire Island (TV series), 2017 American reality TV series
- Fire Island (Pokémon), a location in Pokémon: The Movie 2000
- An island of the fictional Land of Ev in the Oz books of L. Frank Baum
- A hosta cultivar
- "Fire Island" (American Horror Story), an episode of the eleventh season of American Horror Story

== See also ==
- Isla del Fuego, located in the Philippines
- Island Fire, a 2007 fire on Santa Catalina Island, California
