= Trans-St-Laurent =

Canadian ferry

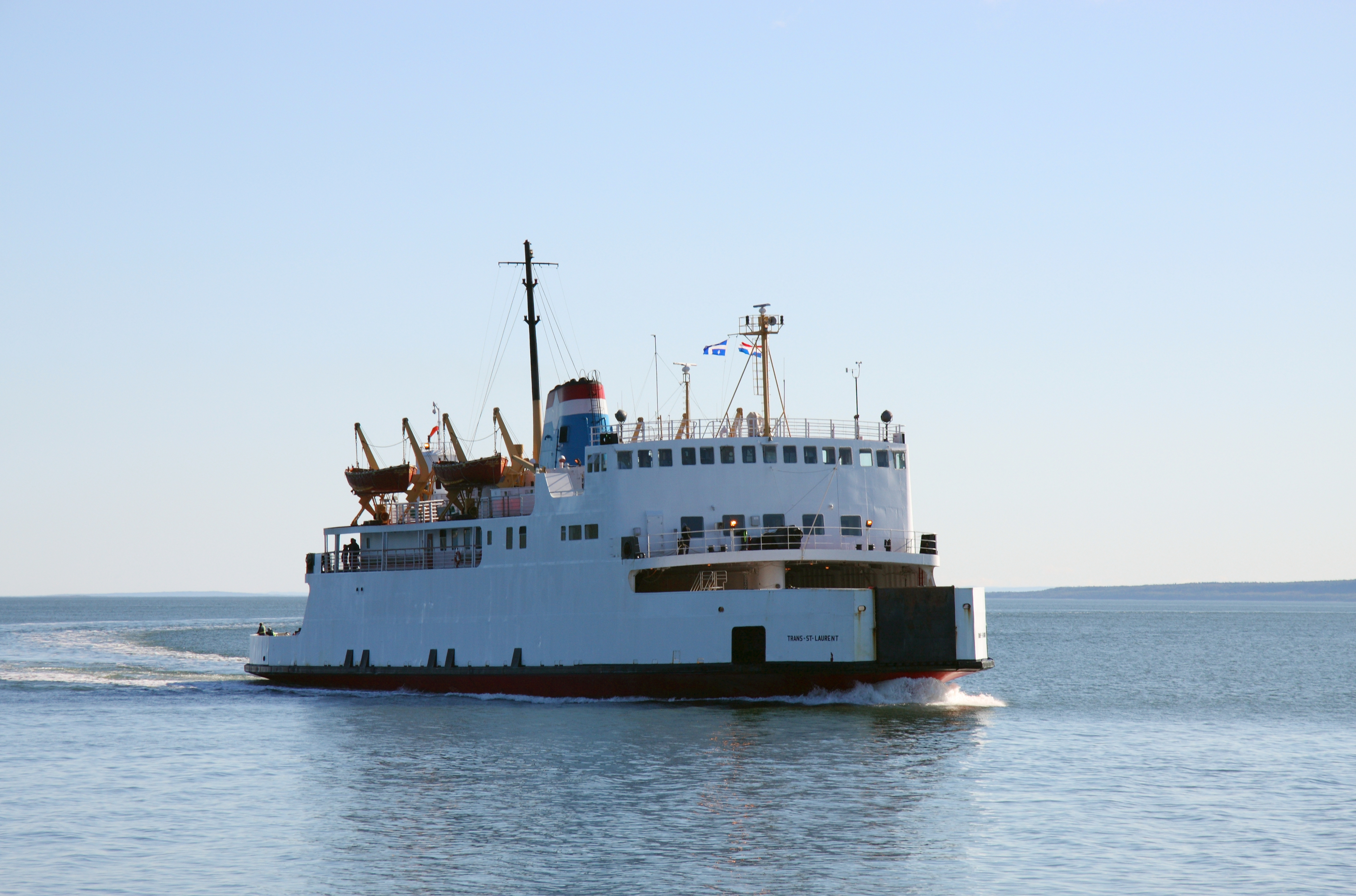

History
- Name: Trans-St-Laurent
- Owner: Clarke Inc.
- Port of registry: Quebec, Canada
- Route: Rivière-du-Loup – Saint-Siméon
- Builder: Davie Shipbuilding, Lauzon
- Launched: 1963
- Completed: 1963
- In service: 1963
- Identification: IMO number: 5409586
- Status: In service

General characteristics
- Type: Ferry
- Tonnage: 2,173.20 GT; 926.79 NT
- Length: 76.08 m (249 ft 7 in)
- Beam: 18.32 m (60 ft 1 in)
- Draught: 4.72 m (15 ft 6 in)
- Installed power: 2,940 hp (2,190 kW)
- Propulsion: 2 diesel engines, 2 propellers
- Speed: 16 knots (30 km/h; 18 mph)
- Capacity: 100 vehicles, 380 passengers

Trans-St-Laurent is a ferry built in 1963 by the Davie Shipbuilding Company at Lauzon, Quebec, Canada. It was launched to meet the growing demand in Quebec for the Rivière-du-Loup–Saint-Siméon ferry route across the Saint Lawrence River. This ferry has been a critical transport link, connecting the Bas-Saint-Laurent region with Charlevoix.

== History ==
The Trans-St-Laurent entered service in 1963 following its construction at the Davie Shipbuilding yard. The ferry was designed to carry both passengers and vehicles, addressing the increasing transportation needs of the area. The vessel can transport approximately 100 vehicles and up to 380 passengers per voyage.

In 1964, the Quebec Ministry of Transport began the construction of a new dock east of the existing facilities at Rivière-du-Loup to accommodate the Trans-St-Laurent and improve ferry services.

== Operations ==
The ferry operates on the Rivière-du-Loup–Saint-Siméon route, a 27-kilometre (17 mi) journey that typically takes around 65 minutes. The ferry service is managed in partnership with the company Traverse Rivière-du-Loup-Saint-Siméon Ltée.

== Ownership ==
The vessel is registered in Quebec, and as of the latest information, it is owned by Clarke Inc., headquartered in Beechville, Nova Scotia.
