= Caribou, Nova Scotia =

Community in Nova Scotia, Canada

Caribou
- Community
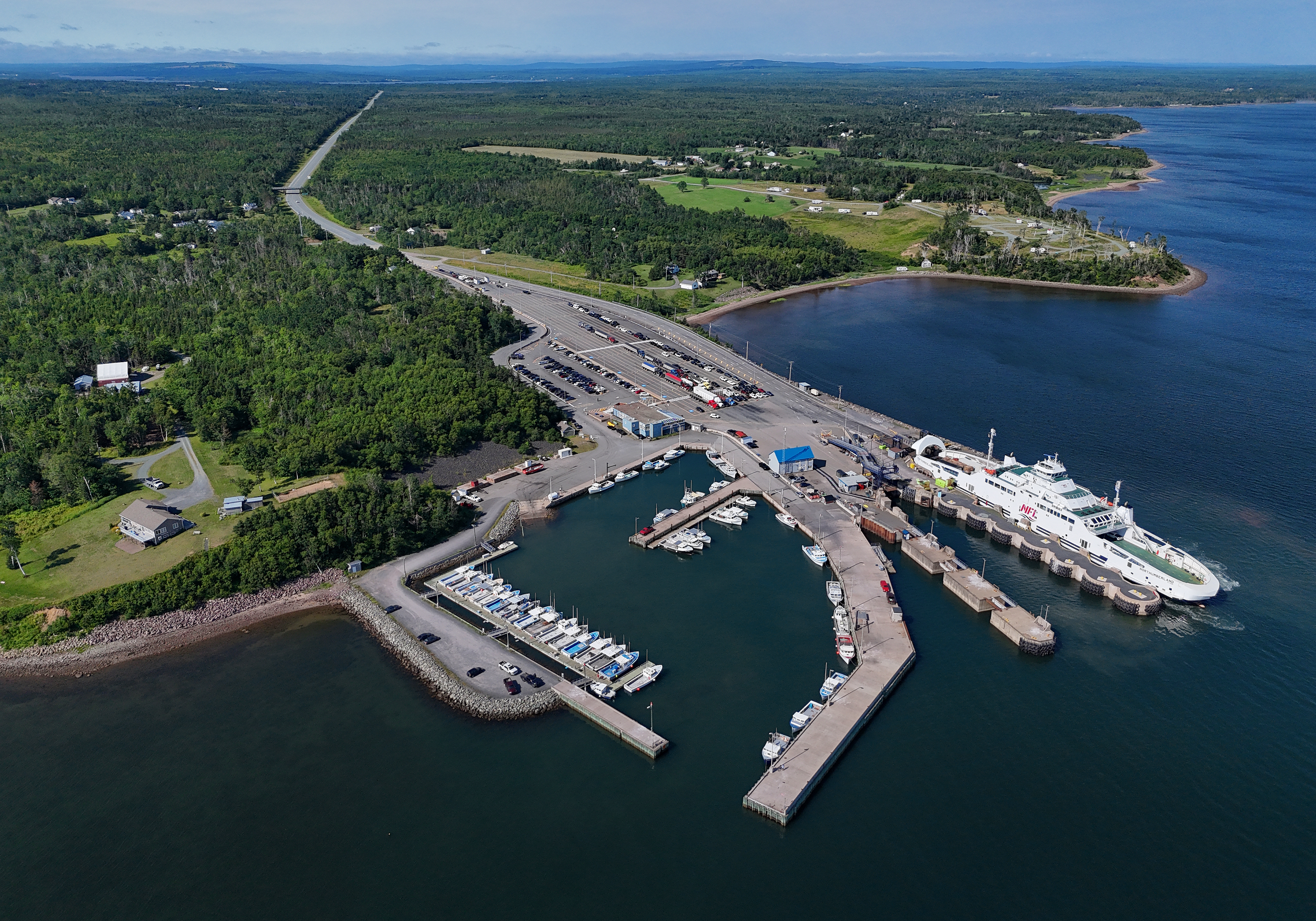
- Aerial view of the Caribou ferry terminal

- Location of Caribou in Nova Scotia
- Coordinates: 45°43′58″N 62°41′47″W
- Country: Canada
- Province: Nova Scotia
- County: Pictou County
- Municipality: Municipality of Pictou County
- District: 3

Government
  - Councillor, District 3: Darla MacKeil
  - MLA, Pictou West: Marco MacLeod
  - MP, Central Nova: Sean Fraser
- Time zone: UTC-4 (AST)
  - Summer (DST): UTC-3 (ADT)
- Postal code: B0K 1H0
- Area codes: 902 and 782

Caribou is a small community in the Canadian province of Nova Scotia, located in Pictou County. It is populated by an estimated 103 people as of 2024.

Located on the Northumberland Strait northwest of the town of Pictou, Caribou is named after the Woodland Caribou which used to live in Nova Scotia. Nearby geographic locations using the name include Caribou Harbour, Caribou Island, Central Caribou and Caribou River.

Caribou became an important port after it was selected by the federal government in the late 1930s to be the Nova Scotia terminal for a seasonal ferry service to Wood Islands in eastern Prince Edward Island. The service, operated by Northumberland Ferries Limited since its inception in 1941, carries passenger, vehicle and truck traffic to Wood Islands, Prince Edward Island between May and December. Caribou also hosts a small passenger-only seasonal ferry service to Pictou Island, departing from the small craft fishing harbour adjacent to the NFL ferry terminal.

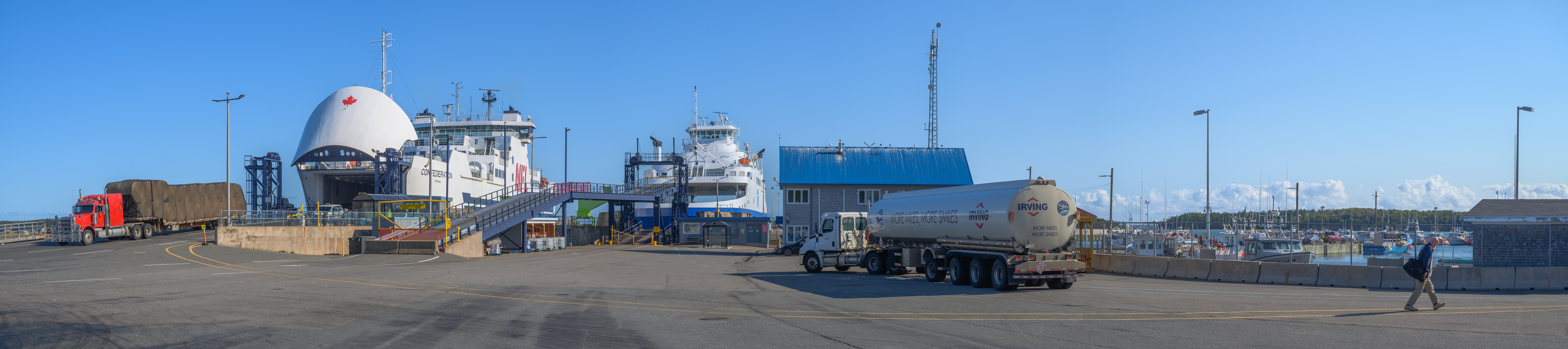
Ferry terminal at Caribou, Nova Scotia

== Climate ==
During August 2018, there were three consecutive tropical nights where the daily low temperature did not fall below 20.4°C and 6 of the 31 days in that month were all tropical nights where the temperature did not fall below 20.1°C on any of these days.
