= Wood Islands, Prince Edward Island =

Community in Canada

Wood Islands
- Locality
- Aerial view of Wood Islands Harbour (2026)

- Location of Wood Islands in Prince Edward Island
- Coordinates: 45°57′58″N 62°45′4″W
- Country: Canada
- Province: Prince Edward Island
- County: Queens County
- Rural municipality: Belfast
- Township: Lot 62
- Time zone: UTC−4 (AST)
  - Summer (DST): UTC−3 (ADT)
- Postal code: C0A 1R0
- Area codes: 902, 782
- GNBC code: BACSK

Wood Islands is a rural farming and fishing community located in southeastern Queens County, Prince Edward Island on the Northumberland Strait. It takes its name from several small forested islands, then located several hundred metres offshore in the Northumberland Strait. The community of Wood Islands falls within the larger PEI Township of Lot 62, which had a population in 2011 of 470 residents, a 13% decrease from the 2006 census count of 540. While the named islands are located on maps by Jacques-Nicolas Bellin: Karte Bellin, 1744: 'I a Bova' and Louis Franquet: Cartes Franquet, 1751: 'Isle a Bois', it was Samuel Johannes Holland who correctly surveyed and depicted the islands, about their basin. The 'European' settlement of Wood Islands began in 1803, but saw its most noted arrivals in 1807 with the arrival, after wintering in Pinette, of a large party of Scottish settlers from the Spencer.

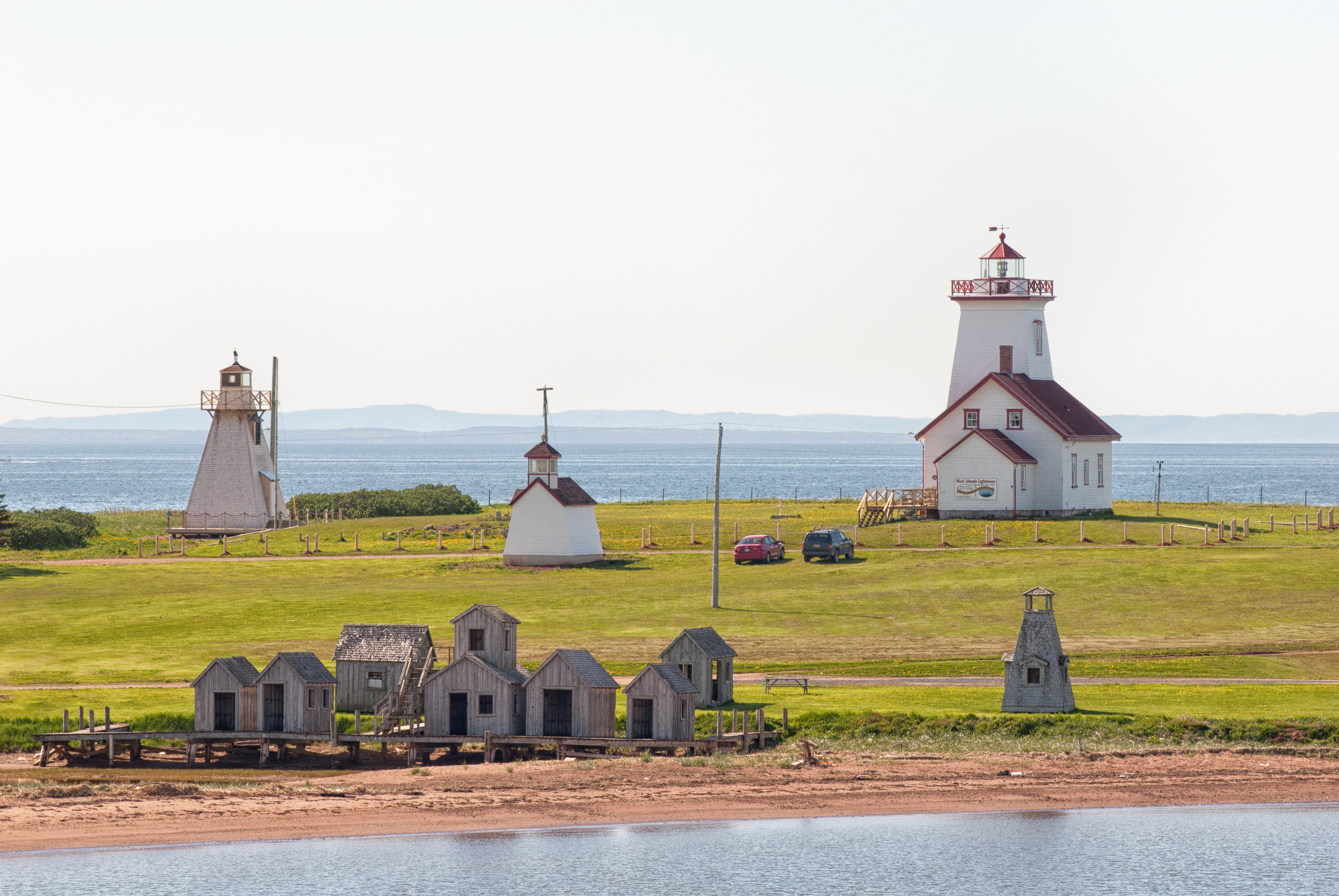
The Wood Islands Lighthouse and Range Lights

== The Harbour and The Lighthouse ==
Wood Islands Harbour. Previously denoted as Victoria Harbour - c. 1868, depicted on Franquet 1751, and as it appears on Jeffreys 1775; their works denote a natural harbour that has long played a noted role in the island's history. Of then three islands, they are now linked by sand bars to form the Harbour. A "winter mail run" operated between Wood Islands and Pictou, Nova Scotia, initiated in 1777, it was the first 'official' winter seasonal connection to the mainland, running until 1827. Today, it is a sheltered harbour hosting a ferry service to Caribou, Nova Scotia, operated by Northumberland Ferries Limited, and a busy fleet of small craft fishing vessels. The southwestern shore of the lagoon forming Wood Islands Harbour is also the southernmost point in Prince Edward Island with coordinates 45º56'54.5"N, 62º45'19.3"W. The entrance to Wood Islands Harbour in Prince Edward Island is at Latitude 45.9484 and Longitude -62.7518. It is designated a 'Core Fishing Harbour' – noted as critical to fishing and aquaculture industries, and it is now being managed by Harbour Authority of Wood Islands.

Wood Islands Lighthouse. During its session of 1874, the Canadian Parliament appropriated $6,000 for a lighthouse at Wood Islands, as an aid of marine traffic in the Strait and for fishers in and around Wood Islands harbour. A contract for $3,000 was entered into with Archibald McKay of Moncton, NB, who abandoned the project after having received $900 for his work. The Department of Marine hired Donald MacMillian to complete the work; the then eight-room structure was finished during the autumn of 1876 and put into operation on 1 November 1876. Allen, 1880 and Cummins, 1927 show the light on the south bank of an island, in the Wood Islands basin, adjacent to the then harbour entrance breakwaters. The southeast island came to be attached to shore with changes in the harbour usage, and with the construction of the Wood Islands ferry terminal and berthing docks. It is the second oldest lighthouse, with an attached dwelling and tower of this style, on the island. The difficult approach meant that the keepers had few visitors before the present road was built in the late 1930s.

== The PEI Railway Murray Harbour Subdivision ==
The Prince Edward Island Railway (Mark PEIR c1875 - 1989) was set out originally to simply cross the Island only from Alberton (then Cascumpec) to Georgetown, thought it quickly added its first two subdivisions, one north-west to Tignish from Alberton and a second east into Souris from Mount Stewart. The 'initial' system of 198.5 miles was 'complete' by January 1875, and by 1880, with additional short spurs, there were two trains daily crossing PEI, one eastbound and one westbound. In 1905, the federal government funded the PEIR to build a new subdivision, from east of Charlottetown, out to Murray Harbour, seeing the construction of the 'new' Hillsborough River Bridge, built to support bringing rail service to southeastern corner of the Island. Under superintendent, Benjamin MacEachern, of Hopefield, on November 1, 1905, of 52.3 miles in length, it fully opened for traffic, the daily run taking a scheduled 3 hours and 35 minutes.

Set out to minimize large cuttings, large fills, and to avoid the need for bridges, the Murray Harbour Subdivision consisted initially of 9, then 13, scheduled stops at booking stations and nine additional flag stations. A Booking Station, saw additionally a freight shed and sometimes with detached facilities, a Flag Stations over time changed from being 'Open Ended Sheds' to 'Closed In Sheds' - with single or double doors and windows. Wood Islands hosted a complete booking station, supported by a flag station, at Belle River (on the Alex Stewart acreage, above the Douses Road), and a flag station, later in Iris / Pleasant Valley (on the Hurd acreage, on the Murray Road).

From 1989, when the trains stopped running, there eventually developed an opportunity for a recreational trail to be set out crossing the Island. The CN trail corridor purchased in 1994, by the PEI government, now sees the Confederation Trail, completed in 2017, again connecting rural PEI. In Wood Islands, from just east of the 'old' Wood Islands Station - south to the Wood Islands Welcome Centre runs a 4.1 km nature trail 'spur'. Built by a group of dedicated community volunteers, the spur ends at a replica PEIR Booking Station, much like the one that sat beside Wood Island and Montague Road, with an original freight shed that once sat beside the old PEIR Belle River (Flag) Station.

== The Northumberland Ferries Limited and The Wood Islands Service ==
Ever since the federal government established a subsidized ferry service in 1917 between Borden, PEI and Cape Tormentine, NB under Crown corporation Canadian National Railways, residents of eastern Prince Edward Island had lobbied their elected representatives for an alternative service to Pictou, Nova Scotia; the Borden - Cape Tormentine ferry having replaced a government steamship service between Georgetown and Pictou.

In 1935, Prime Minister MacKenzie King brought Saskatchewan politician Charles A. Dunning back into federal politics to economically resurrect the nation from the Great Depression and appointed him Minister of Finance. Dunning was elected by acclamation as a parachute candidate in the dual riding of Queen's (it had 2 MPs at the time). Residents seized upon this opportunity and elicited a promise from the King government to establish a ferry service from southeastern PEI to Caribou, NS, near the town of Pictou.

The location of the PEI terminal was a source of controversy as the deepest water on the PEI shore suitable for a ferry dock was located just east of the Kings County boundary in Little Sands, Prince Edward Island, several kilometres east of Wood Islands. However, given that Dunning represented the riding of Queen's, the Little Sands location was rejected in favour of a terminal located at Wood Islands, to better help the residents of his electoral district, despite its inferior water depth.

The federal government set about building a ferry port in the community's small harbour, dredging sand from the harbour bottom and constructing wharves. A new privately owned company, Northumberland Ferries Limited, was established to manage and operate the seasonal ferry service under license for the federal government, which retained ownership of the terminals, real property and vessels.

Dunning left politics in 1939 but the ferry service was instituted nevertheless in 1941 and has continued uninterrupted under the NFL banner to the present day, using several used and new vessels over the decades. Today it remains the only ferry service to the mainland after the Confederation Bridge opened in 1997. A major redevelopment of the Wood Islands terminal took place in the early 1990s before the new high capacity M/V Confederation entered service in 1993. The federal government continues providing financial assistance to NFL under the terms of a contribution agreement, while the company leases two ferry terminals and vessels from the federal government. Today, though seasonal, it remains the only ferry service to the mainland.

== The Wood Islands and Area Development Corporation and The Wood Islands Welcome Centre ==
In 2002 Premier Binns opened a provincial Visitor Information Centre at the intersection of Route 1 and Route 4, located one-half kilometre from the Wood Islands ferry terminal, to welcome the more than 350,000 ferry passengers travel through Wood Islands each year. Then with a corporate Liquor Control Commission retail outlet, the new centre also incorporated a community room, two rental shops and a seasonal museum, which became the responsibility of the Wood Islands and Area Development Corporation. Today, the corporation now manages the Wood Islands Lighthouse (c1876) and a commercial interest in a seasonal PEI LCC Agency Store. As The PEI Gateway East - The Wood Islands Welcome Centre, welcoming all seasonal visitors, allows all visitors the opportunity to learn more about the history and the opportunities of eastern PEI. The Wood Islands - Welcome Centre and Eastern PEI are home to the 70-Mile Coastal Yard Sale held in September each year.

== Wood Islands Historical Notes ==
The Wood Island Rifles c1864. The Queen's County (Administrative) Regiment of PEI Volunteers had its headquarters in Charlottetown and included twenty 'Independent Rifle' companies, of which one – The Wood Island Rifles – was led by Captain James McMillan, and his deputy Lieutenant C. McNeill.

Wood Islands Loyal Orange Institution Hall. The Grand Lodge of Prince Edward Island received its warrant on February 24, 1862, authorizing the formation of provincial grand lodges. The Association was first planted on PEI in the year 1849 under the authority of the grand master of Nova Scotia. The first Scarlet warrant was granted July 24, 1859, at which time there were four primary lodges in the province, one in Wood Islands. Sword Lodge: Number 1007, at Woodville, for Belfast District, had Hector C. McMillan as its Master c1863 to c1891, later Malcom Munn was Master in c1905. The Lodge was located at the junction of then 'Upper Wood Island Road' – now Stewart Road and Wood Island Road. The lodge building survives and has been moved to a local farm acreage.

Wood Islands Pioneer Cemetery. This cemetery on Pioneer Cemetery Road stands in a 'thin' forested area between the Trans-Canada Highway and the Northumberland Strait. The cemetery is a historical footprint of the early Selkirk settlers; as it is believed the cemetery dates from 1807. An 1834 land conveyance refers to the site as "the old burial ground". The site ceased to be used in 1910, and was restored in 1972. Today, a Celtic cross inscribed with the badge of 'Clan McMillan' is located near the entrance. A Murdoch McMillan was interred in 1810, but the oldest remaining headstone is that of Hector McMillan, who died in 1819. Approximately 33 headstones survive; however, several of these are illegible. Other families interred here include members of the Bell, McNeill, McRae, Munn, Smith, Currie, McDonald, and McKay families, names familiar to arrivals on the Spencer in 1806. The McMillans were part of the migration of Scottish Highlanders sponsored by Lord Selkirk, coming originally from Colonsay in Argyle in 1806. They thought to settle in Little Sands, however, having set fishing nets just off shore of Wood Islands, from where the cemetery is now located, and were rewarded with a bountiful catch, they decided to make their home in Wood Islands.

Wood Islands Presbyterian Church. In the 1860s a smaller pioneer church came to be replaced by the new church in the centre of the Belle Creek / Wood Islands community, on land from the original Dougal Munn acreage. This, the 'new' church burned to the ground on 28 November 1943 and was then replaced an edifice designed by J.E. Harris. The dedication service of the now current church took place on 10 May 1946. Dr. MacGregor of Pictou County, NS, first ministered to the Presbyterian congregation of Woodville (Wood Islands) between 1806 and 1819. The Rev. John MacLennan served from 1825 to 1843, when most of the congregation became Free Church of Scotland. The congregation continued to receive services from itinerant ministers, and students from the Free Church Presbytery in Pictou, NS, until The Rev. Donald MacNeil was installed as minister in 1857. For many years the charge was called the 'Woodville and Little Sands Presbyterian Congregation' until the PEI Presbytery separated off Little Sands and amalgamated it with Murray Harbour South in 1891. Financial difficulties in the 1930s and 1940s eventually led to the sharing of a minister by Wood Islands, Culloden, and Murray Harbour South. The Wood Islands Presbyterian Church now draws its congregation from Flat River, Wood Islands, Culloden, Belle River, Iris, and Melville.

Wood Island West. Settlement, Lot 62, name was adopted 25 April 1946, on Canada Map 11 L/2. Confirmed on 8 November 1948, status changed to 'Locality' in 1960 Gazetteer. Name changed to 'Wood Islands, Settlement' dated 21 November 1966, on Canada Map 11 E/15. Served by Canada Post Service: Wood Islands West Post Office, opened 1905-11-01, Jas. A. McMillan as the first Post Master, closed on 1932-03-15, due to limited usefulness.

Wood Island West School. The first teacher at Wood Island West School was John MacNeil, listed in the Government Warrant Book as first paid on March 5, 1828, for teaching at Wood Islands. He continued teaching at Wood Islands until 1831, when Neil Arbuckle replaced him. The position of schoolmaster appears to have been vacant until 1835 when John B. McMillan was hired. Schoolmaster McMillan taught from 1835 to 1843, from 1848 to 1849 and from 1853 to 1866, for a total of twenty-two years. Forming School District Number 135, it was listed with the Board of Education on August 10, 1882. The original small building was enlarged by 1945, and continued to serve as a school until consolidation in 1968. The former school building has then operated as a community centre in 1969 when it became home to the local branch of the Women's Institute.

Wood Islands Women's Institute Hall. The Women's Institute is located in the former Wood Island West School, which dates from the early 1840s. The wooden shingled structure includes the original footprint of the building. The Wood Islands Women's Institute Hall is valued as an example of one of the few surviving former rural school buildings in Prince Edward Island. It has undergone several renovations in its history, but it continues to be the site of local meetings, community socials, and political rallies in Wood Islands.

Wood Island North. Settlement, Lot 62, name was adopted 6 May 1947, on C. 4405 at 46 00 N 62 46W. Status changed to 'Post Office' in 1960 Gazetteer. Name changed to 'Wood Islands, Settlement' as shown on Canada Map 11 E/15, 4 January 1967. Served by the Island postal service prior to entry into the Dominion, with John Kennedy was the PM, in 1864, remained in Canada Post Service until closed in 1915.

Wood Island Station – PEIR / CGR Station Number: 747. After the PEIR Belle River Station, skirting above the Belle River, parallel to the Douses Road, looping around the Selkirk Road, and finally the Belle River weir and its head water, the Wood Island Station was located on the southwest corner of the rail crossing with the Montague - Wood Islands Road. Here the station housed the Wood Island (North) Post Office, the station agent being the postmaster. The post office was first run in the train station by Mrs Mary McMillan until her resignation in 1906, and operated until October 1915. Erected in July 1905 as a 'PEIR Booking Station' with waiting room and ticket office, Wood Island Station could be found in May 1917 on the Canadian Government (PEI) Railway / Murray Harbour Subdivision at Mile: 36.3 (36.5). Having been renumbered as CNR Station Number: 13386 in 1947, the Station was demolished prior to 1994; then CN having abandoned all its rail service on Prince Edward Island in December 1989.

Wood Island East. Settlement, Lot 62, name was adopted 25 April 1946, on Canada Map 11 L/2. Confirmed 8 November 1948, status changed to 'Locality' in 1960 Gazetteer. Name changed to 'Wood Islands, Settlement' dated 21 November 1966, on Canada Map 11 E/15. Formally known as:

- Port Wood. Settlement, Lot 62, former name for the eastern part of now Wood Islands, having Canada Post Service at Port Wood Post Office, Queen's County from 15.08.1908 and closing 31.10.1915.
- Woodville. Settlement, Lot 62, 'second' former name for eastern part of now Wood Islands.
- Burnt Wood(s) (Cove). Settlement, Lot 62, 'first' former name for eastern part of now Wood Islands. Located on Holland 1781, on East side of Wood Islands, Lot 62 and mentioned in Lord Selkirk Diary of August 1803.

Wood Island East School. Wood Island East School opened in 1856 with Duncan Crawford as its first teacher, with forty-one pupils registered (23 boys and 18 girls). The School Inspector noted of the "new district formed, and school-house built, since last visit to this party of the Country; opened in weeks before being visited." In 1864, there was thought to close the school for reasons of under use, with so few attending, and to merge its students with those in the Upper Belle Creek District. This did not happen and designated School District Number 137, it was registered with the Board of Education on August 10, 1882, and remained open until consolidation in 1968.

Wood Island(s) Postal Service 1855 – 1980. When Prince Edward Island joined Canada (in 1873), its postal administration was absorbed into the federal Post Office Department, until transferred to Canada Post Corporation (in 1981). Long before rural mail delivery began, mail was to be picked up or left at the post office, with facilities generally supplied by the postmaster. Typically (Type 11 Revenue Offices) operating from the general store or in the home of a community resident, Wood Island(s) was served by five Post Offices. Wood Islands first 'Colonial' Post Office seems to have opened in Wood Island (North) in 1855, until confirmed as a 'Canadian' Post Office in 1874. Postal services were fully available 'directly' in Wood Islands until the closing of its 'Summer' Post Office in June 1980.

- The Wood Islands PO No.3612 - operated under the PEI Postal Service from c1855 to 1874, on the Wood Island Road, just east of Wood Island Creek, until 1874, then re-established on 01 Apr 1889, with D. Crawford as a Canada Post Master, being relocated in 1906 and in 1967 and renamed Wood Islands PO, closing permanently on 17 Oct 1969, with its last PM Mrs. Alvina Jane Emery.
- The Wood Islands 'Summer' PO No. 23646 - first operated by Miss Eva Grace MacMillan from June 1970 then until closing in June 1980, under Frank MacMillan.
- The Wood Island (North) PO No.19710 - operated under PEI Postal Service from c1855 / re-established on 01 Jul 1874 with John Kennedy as a Canada Post Master, operating until closing in Oct 1915, under PM Neil Peter McMillan, when consolidated with The Wood Islands West PO.
- The Wood Islands West PO No. 23643 - opened November 1905 with Jas A. McMillan, as the first PM and operated until March 1932 under Allan J. McMillan, being closed for limited usefulness.
- The Port Wood (Wood Islands East) PO No. 19474 - with Daniel Keenan as its only PM, opened in August 1908 and closed in October 1915, being impacted with the coming of rural mail delivery (RMD).

Wood Island(s) Winter Mail Service 1775 – 1829. In the early years of settlement a fortnightly mail run was in place between Wood Islands and Pictou, Nova Scotia, as the Island's only winter link with the mainland. In 1775, Governor Walter Patterson initiated the iceboat service across the 22.5 km (14 miles) to Caribou, Nova Scotia. Island mail carriers trekked to Wood Islands and then undertook the most dangerous part of the journey, across the ice to Pictou, NS and then the short jump to Caribou. The first trial of a new route was made in 1827, and by 1829 all mail was carried from Cape Traverse, PEI to Cape Tormentine, NB.
