= List of generating stations in Prince Edward Island =

This is a list of power stations in Prince Edward Island, Canada.

Prince Edward Island has nine generating stations, and is the only Canadian province without an active hydroelectric power station (the last, Knox's Dam ended commercial operation in the 1955). The province is largely dependent on imported power from NB Power generation facilities in New Brunswick. Two 180 MW capacity submarine power lines provide more than 80% of the provincial load. Since the early 2000, the provincial government has promoted the province as an ideal location for developing wind farms.

Maritime Electric, a subsidiary of St. John's-based Fortis Inc., operates the integrated public utility serving most of the province, with the exception of the City of Summerside which has had a municipal electric utility in operation since 1920; Summerside Electric purchases power from sources such as NB Power that is transmitted to the city through Maritime Electric's network. Both utilities own and operate generating stations (diesel combustion turbines); these plants are used as peakers or during emergencies.

== Petroleum ==
Name	Location	Capacity (MW)	Date	Owner	Type	Ref
Borden Generating Station	46°15′01″N 63°41′22″W	42		Maritime Electric	Combustion turbine (diesel)	
Charlottetown Generating Station	46°14′18″N 63°07′09″W	50		Maritime Electric	Combustion turbine (diesel)	
Harvard Street Generating Station	46°23′41″N 63°46′58″W	25		Summerside Electric	Combustion turbine (diesel)	

== Photovoltaic ==
Name	Location	Capacity (MW)	Date	Owner	Ref
Summerside Sunbank	46°24′08″N 63°49′10″W	21.6		Summerside Electric	

== Wind ==
List of all wind farms in Prince Edward Island.

Name	Location	Capacity (MW)	Date	Owner	Ref
Eastern Kings Wind Farm	46°26′00″N 62°06′46″W	30		PEI Energy Corporation	
North Cape Wind Farm	47°02′47″N 64°00′10″W	10.6		PEI Energy Corporation	
Norway Wind Farm	47°00′56″N 64°02′30″W	9		Suez Renewable Energy	
Summerside Wind Farm	46°24′08″N 63°49′10″W	12		Summerside Electric	
West Cape Wind Farm	46°40′05″N 64°24′22″W	99		Suez Renewable Energy	

== Decommissioned stations ==
Name	Location	Capacity (MW)	Date	Owner	Type	Ref
Charlottetown Thermal Generating Station	46°14′18″N 63°07′09″W	60	1960–2021	Maritime Electric	Thermal (fuel oil)	
Knox's Dam	46°09′31″N 62°40′31″W		1917–1955	Maritime Electric Company Limited	Hydro (ROR)	

== See also ==
- Maritime Electric
- Electricity sector in Canada
- List of power stations in Canada
