= List of people from Prince Edward Island =

Provincial flag of Prince Edward Island

This is a list of notable people who are from Prince Edward Island, Canada, or have spent a large part or formative part of their career in that province.

== A ==
- Milton Acorn, poet
- Angèle Arsenault, singer, songwriter and media host

== B ==
- Leone Bagnall, politician
- Francis Bain, author, scientist, farmer
- Carolyn Bertram, politician
- Paula Biggar, politician
- Lorne Bonnell, politician
- Billy Bridges, Olympic para-athlete
- Betty Jean Brown, politician

== C ==
- Catherine Callbeck, politician
- Dave Cameron, ice hockey coach
- Alex Campbell, politician
- Urban Carmichael, storyteller and poet
- George Coles, politician
- Jared Connaughton, Olympic sprinter
- Rose Cousins, musician
- Josh Currie, hockey player

== D ==
- Tanya Davis, musician and poet
- Noah Dobson, hockey player
- Pierre Douville, naval captain
- Lloyd Duffy, jockey
- Mike Duffy, journalist and politician
- Gordie Dwyer, hockey player and coach

== F ==
- Peter W. Forbes (born 1850), member of the California state legislature

== G ==
- Brett Gallant, professional curler
- Gerard Gallant, ice hockey player and coach
- Lennie Gallant, singer-songwriter
- Millie Gamble, photographer
- Joe Ghiz, politician
- Robert Ghiz, politician
- George Godfrey, boxer
- Jenn Grant, singer-songwriter
- Dylan Mohan Gray, filmmaker/documentarian

== H ==
- Vern Handrahan, baseball player
- Francis Longworth Haszard, politician, jurist
- Wally Hennessey, harness racing driver
- Libbe Hubley, politician
- Hangman Hughes, wrestler

== J ==
- Ross Johnston, hockey player

== K ==
- Lorie Kane, golfer
- Francis Clement Kelley, second Roman Catholic bishop of Oklahoma City
- Forbes Kennedy, former ice hockey player
- Michael Kennedy, film and television director
- Joey Kitson, singer

== L ==
- David Laird, framer of the Indian Act and first resident lieutenant governor of the Northwest Territories
- Daniel Ledwell, musician

== M ==
- Amber MacArthur, broadcasting personality and author
- David MacEachern, Olympic gold medallist and world champion in bobsledding
- Zack MacEwen, hockey player
- Martha MacIsaac, actress
- Tara MacLean, singer-songwriter
- Catherine MacLellan, singer-songwriter
- Gene MacLellan, musician
- Alexander Wallace Matheson, politician
- John Alexander Mathieson, educator, politician, jurist
- Adam McQuaid, hockey player
- Lucy Maud Montgomery, writer
- Scott Morrison, basketball coach
- Heather Moyse, two-time Olympic gold medallist in bobsledding

== N ==
- Samuel D. Nicholson, U.S. senator, businessman

== O ==
- Joe O'Brien, harness racing driver
- Steve Ott, ice hockey player
- Lemuel Cambridge Owen, shipbuilder, banker and former premier

== P ==
- Edward Palmer, lawyer, politician
- James Colledge Pope, businessman, former premier
- William Henry Pope, land agent, lawyer, jurist

== R ==
- Claire Rankin, actress
- Brad Richards, former ice hockey player
- James Jeffrey Roche, poet and diplomat
- Whitney Rose, country musician

== S ==
- Jacob Gould Schurman, educator and diplomat
- Gail Shea, politician
- Michael Smith, chef and television host
- Kent Stetson, writer
- Mark Strand, poet

== T ==
- Jackie Torrens, actress
- Jonathan Torrens, actor
- Wes Trainor, hockey player
- Al Tuck, musician

== W ==
- Alexander Bannerman Warburton, former premier
- Nathan Wiley, musician
- George Wood, professional baseball player

== Y ==
- James Yeo, politician
- John Yeo, politician
- Johnny Young, politician
- Ross Young, politician

== See also ==
- List of writers from Prince Edward Island
