= Petroleum pricing in Prince Edward Island =

Petroleum pricing in Prince Edward Island is regulated by the Prince Edward Island Regulatory and Appeals Commission, an independent quasi-judicial tribunal established under provincial legislation. The Commission sets wholesale and retail prices for petroleum products under the Petroleum Products Act.

== Price Make up ==
Petroleum marketers buy fuel on the basis of the "rack price" and the price set by refiners willing to supply Prince Edward Island retailers, mainly the Irving Oil Refinery in Saint John, New Brunswick, which, since August 2013 is the only oil refinery remaining in the Maritimes. IRAC petroleum regulators determine a "wholesale price" or "Approved Dealer Base Price" based on commodity prices usually derived from the NYEX. IRAC petroleum regulators then sets a "tank truck price" which includes Federal Excise Tax (10¢/L for gasoline and 6¢/L for diesel, as well as the provincial petroleum tax (13.1¢/L for gasoline and 20.2¢/L for diesel). IRAC petroleum regulators also establish a "retail price" which provides a profit margin for retailers established at 5¢/L to 7.5¢/L for full serve fuel and 4¢/L to 5.5¢/L for self serve fuel. All prices have an additional 15% Harmonized Sales Tax (HST) added.

Prices are revised on the 1st and 15th day of each month, or whenever the price raises or falls on the market sufficiently to interrupt the cycle by triggering an interrupting formula.

== Notice ==
Consumers in Prince Edward Island are notified of any changes in the price via the IRAC website and through the media. Price changes are closely guarded by IRAC to prevent runs on supply at local service stations.

== See Also ==
- Island Regulatory and Appeals Commission
