= Urban Carmichael =

Urban Carmichael (January 11, 1952 - February 13, 2006) was a storyteller, comic, songwriter and entertainer from Prince Edward Island, Canada. Known and loved across Canada and the US for his rural based humour and his dedication to the continuance of the oratorical traditions of Prince Edward Island and his Irish heritage. Carmichael was also a gifted writer, creating copy for radio and television. He is widely believed to have been the greatest storyteller in Island history. His trademark phrases are so numerous and familiar to Islanders that they are commonly referred to as "Urbanisms".

Carmichael was the son of John and Mary (Murphy) Carmichael and one of 10 children. He began performing as a child and continued to do so for more than 35 years. He gave countless Maritime performers their first opportunities for live performance, was a beloved mentor to many, and he shared the stage with most of the greatest performers in Atlantic Canada and beyond. For five years he performed with fiddler Connor O'Callaghan in the Celtic Review that bore his name at Orwell Corner Historic Village on PEI. Carmichael's final performance was on the stage of the Confederation Centre of the Arts in Charlottetown, for the CBC Radio production Madly Off in All Directions with host Lorne Elliott, just weeks before his death.

Carmichael died at the age of 54 after a five-year battle with esophageal cancer. He was surrounded by those who loved him and he is buried at his childhood parish in Vernon River, Prince Edward Island.

== Discography ==
- I Couldn't Make it to Your Party...So I Sent My Tape! (1992)
- Scatter My Ashes (1994)
- Wanted Live! (1996)
- Come From the Heart (2000)
- The Island According to Urban Carmichael (2005)

== Publications ==
- Roadkill (2005)
