= Prince Edward Island Regulatory and Appeals Commission =

Public utilities commission of Prince Edward Island

- Abbreviation: IRAC
- Formation: 1991
- Type: Independent quasi-judicial tribunal
- Headquarters: Charlottetown, Prince Edward Island
- Region served: Prince Edward Island
- Chair and Chief Executive Officer: Pamela Williams, K.C.
- Website: irac.pe.ca

The Prince Edward Island Regulatory and Appeals Commission, informally shortened to the Island Regulatory and Appeals Commission or IRAC, is the independent tribunal and regulating arm of the Government of Prince Edward Island.

IRAC was established in 1991 following the amalgamation of the former Public Utilities Commission, the Land Use Commission and the Office of the Director of Residential Rental Property. It is governed under the Island Regulatory and Appeals Commission Act. IRAC reports directly to the Legislative Assembly of Prince Edward Island, currently through the Minister of Education and Early Childhood Development.

IRAC's responsibilities are quite broad and cover the following issues:

- petroleum pricing
- establishment of petroleum retail stations
- property taxes and appeals
- unsightly premises
- waste collection fees for the Island Waste Management Corporation (another agency of the provincial government)
- land use
- electricity rates for Maritime Electric and Summerside Electric Utility
- municipal water and sewer rates
- residential property rent rate increases

== See also ==
- Nova Scotia Utility and Review Board
