= Maritime Electric =

- Company type: Subsidiary
- Industry: Energy
- Founded: 1918
- Headquarters: 180 Kent Street; Charlottetown, Prince Edward Island; C1A 7N2
- Area served: Prince Edward Island
- Products: Electricity
- Parent: Fortis Inc.
- Website: www.maritimeelectric.com

Maritime Electric is the supplier of electricity in Prince Edward Island, Canada. Maritime Electric is a public utility, and is regulated by the Island Regulatory and Appeals Commission (IRAC) under the Electric Power Act and the Renewable Energy Act. The utility operates two generating stations on the island: the Charlottetown Generating Station and the Borden Generating Station.

On November 13, 2009, it was announced that the PEI government was in discussion with the province of Quebec, with regard to providing electric power between the two provinces, which could lead to a long-term supply contract with Hydro-Québec, the construction of a submarine transmission line linking PEI and the Magdalen Islands, and, pending Fortis' involvement, the sale of Maritime Electric to Hydro-Québec. This followed the announcement of Hydro-Québec's proposed purchase of most of NB Power's assets two weeks earlier (which failed in March 2010).

== See also ==
- List of Canadian electric utilities
