= Charlottetown Generating Station =

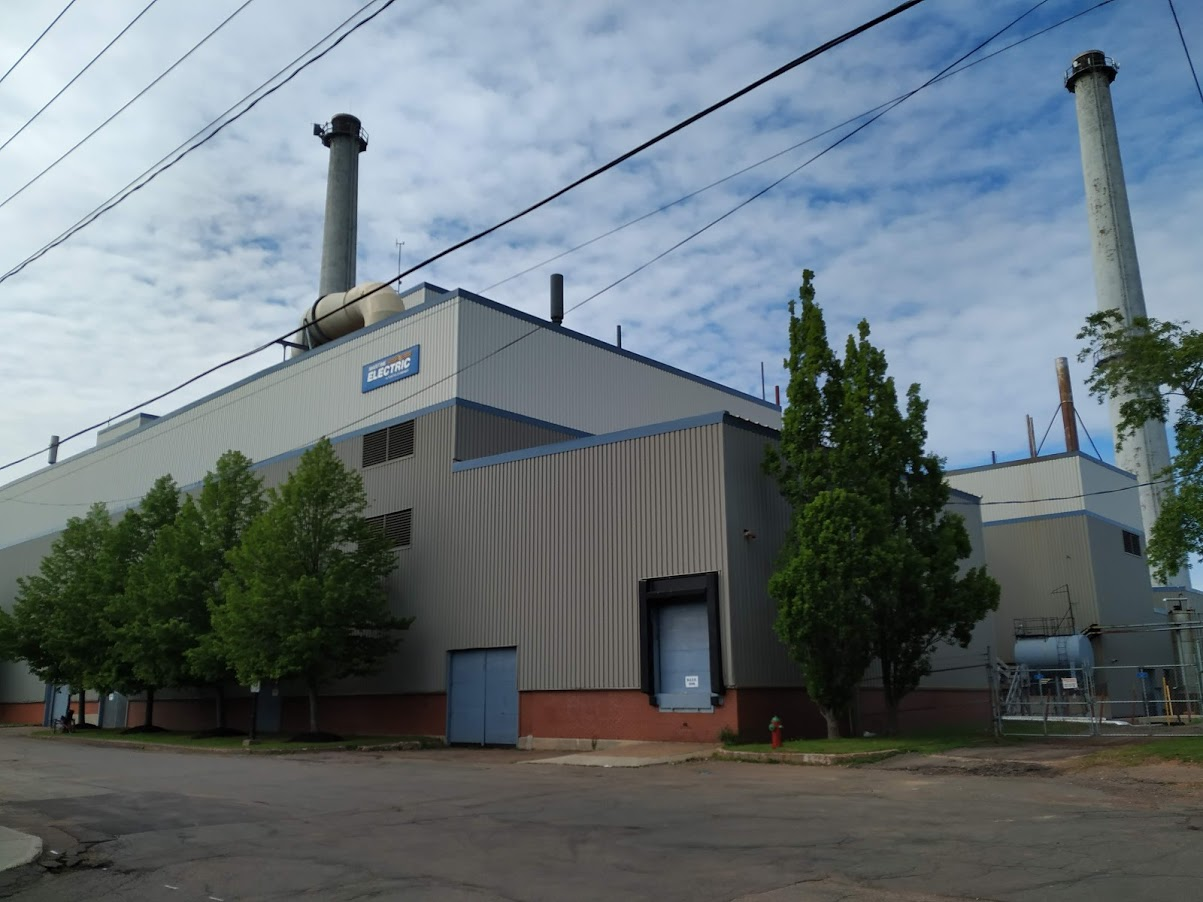
- Front of the legacy steam plant facing Cumberland Street (demolished in 2024).
- Country: Canada
- Location: Charlottetown, Prince Edward Island
- Coordinates: 46.23834°N 63.11832°W
- Status: Operational
- Construction began: ca. 1850s
- Owner: Maritime Electric
- Operator: Maritime Electric

Thermal power station
- Primary fuel: Diesel oil

Power generation
- Units operational: 1 X 50 MW (diesel)
- Make and model: General Electric
- Nameplate capacity: 50 MW

External links
- Commons: Related media on Commons

Charlottetown Generating Station (CTGS) is a diesel generating station owned by Maritime Electric, located on Cumberland Street in Charlottetown, Prince Edward Island. As of December 2024, the CTGS property consists of 14 parcels of land and 4 water lot parcels measuring approximately 11.65 ha (28.8 acres) and contains the following infrastructure:

- energy control centre
- substation for downtown and east side of Charlottetown
- one diesel fired General Electric LM6000 diesel combustion turbine generating 50 MW

== History ==
The CTGS property has developed in phases through various previous owners:

- 1854–1900 (approximately) saw the property developed by the Charlottetown Gas Light Company to produce coal gas with coal delivered by railcar by the Prince Edward Island Railway. The coal gas was then distributed throughout the city by pipes underneath the street to light streetlights. Charlottetown Gas Light Company was purchased by Charlottetown Light & Power Company in 1898.
- 1900–1926 saw electricity generation begin on the property around 1900 when a Corliss reciprocating steam engine and generator were relocated from a decommissioned generating station at the corner of Water Street and Pownal Street in Charlottetown. Coal gas continued to be produced as well. Fredericton- based Maritime Electric purchased Charlottetown Light & Power Company, resulting in the property being controlled by the current (as of December 2024) owner.
- 1926–1931 saw the property redeveloped, beginning with the removal of the Corliss engine, generator and coal gas equipment. Three coal-fired boilers and steam turbines were installed over a 5 year period, creating what came to be known as the "steam plant."
- From 1943–1976 the property continued to be developed with additional units (Nos. 4-10) being added over this period, along with the conversion from coal to Bunker C fuel oil. Boilers and generators were consolidated to 5 units with an installed capacity of 60 MW. The entire facility was converted to Bunker C fuel in 1959-1960 and construction of the distinctive twin chimneys that towered over the Charlottetown waterfront.
- 1977–2005 saw the CTGS steam plant revert to an on-demand power source. CTGS had been the primary source of electricity for Prince Edward Island until the installation of twin submarine cables (2 x 100 MW) underneath the Northumberland Strait in 1977, which created the first interconnection between Maritime Electric and NB Power. The lines ran from Fernwood, PEI to Murray Corner, NB. Beginning in 1977, the steam plant at CTGS was primarily used during periods of peak demand or when the power supply from New Brunswick was impaired.
- 2005–2021 To meet rising demand for electricity, this period saw the installation of a 50 MW diesel fired LM6000 combustion turbine supplied by General Electric at a cost of $35 Million. Throughout the remainder of the 2000s through the 2010s, as Prince Edward Island's demand for electricity continued to grow, several large wind farms were built during but they, along with CTGS, were unable to supply all of the province's peak demand in the event of an interruption to the 200 MW interconnection with NB Power. In 2017 a second interconnection was completed between Maritime Electric and NB Power with the installation of twin submarine cables (2 x 180 MW) running from Borden-Carleton, PEI to Cape Tormentine, NB at a cost of $142.5 million. With interconnection capacity of 580 MW, Maritime Electric began the process of decommissioning the legacy 60 MW steam plant at CTGS, while planning to keep the 50 MW diesel combustion turbine operating at the site.
- 2021–2024 saw the steam plant at CTGS officially decommissioned on December 31, 2021. In 2024 the following facilities at CTGS were demolished and removed:
  - Steam plant with 5 x 12 MW generators and associated boilers
  - Twin chimneys (smokestacks)
  - Pumphouse (across Water St beside the shore of the Hillsborough River
