= Borden Generating Station =

Borden Generating Station Generating Station
- Country: Canada
- Location: Borden-Carleton, Prince Edward Island
- Coordinates: 46°15′1″N 63°41′18″W
- Status: Operational
- Owner: Maritime Electric

Thermal power station
- Primary fuel: Diesel oil

Power generation
- Nameplate capacity: 40MW

Borden Generating Station is a diesel generating station power station owned by Maritime Electric, in Borden-Carleton, Prince Edward Island. The plant is primarily used during periods of peak demand or when the power supply from the mainline is impaired.
