= Prince Edward Island =

Province of Canada

Prince Edward Island Île-du-Prince-Édouard (French)
- Province
- Flag Coat of arms
- Motto: Parva sub ingenti (Latin) "The small protected by the great"
- Coordinates: 46°24′N 63°12′W
- Country: Canada
- Before confederation: Colony of Prince Edward Island
- Confederation: July 1, 1873 (8th)
- Capital (and largest city): Charlottetown
- Largest metro: Charlottetown

Government
  - Type: Parliamentary constitutional monarchy
  - Lieutenant Governor: Wassim Salamoun
  - Premier: Rob Lantz
- Legislature: Legislative Assembly of Prince Edward Island
- Federal representation: Parliament of Canada
- House seats: 4 of 343 (1.2%)
- Senate seats: 4 of 105 (3.8%)

Area
  - Total: 5,660 km^{2} (2,190 sq mi)
  - Land: 5,660 km^{2} (2,190 sq mi)
  - Water: 0 km^{2} (0 sq mi) 0%
  - Rank: 13th
- 0.1% of Canada

Population (2021)
  - Total: 154,331
  - Estimate (Q3 2026): 182,989
  - Rank: 10th
  - Density: 27.27/km^{2} (70.6/sq mi)
- Demonym(s): Prince Edward Islander, Islander (colloquial)
- Official languages: English (de facto)

GDP
  - Rank: 10th
  - Total (2024): C$10.889 billion
  - Per capita: C$60,592 (11th)

HDI
  - HDI (2023): 0.923—Very high (8th)
- Time zone: UTC-04:00 (Atlantic)
- Canadian postal abbr.: PE
- Postal code prefix: C
- Area code: 902
- ISO 3166 code: CA-PE
- Flower: Pink lady's slipper
- Tree: Red oak
- Bird: Blue jay
- Website: princeedwardisland.ca
- Rankings include all provinces and territories

Prince Edward Island (Note: PEI; French: Île-du-Prince-Édouard; Scottish Gaelic: Eilean a' Phrionnsa; colloquially known as the Island) is an island province of Canada. It is the smallest province by both land area and population, but has the highest population density in Canada. The island has several nicknames: "Garden of the Gulf", "Birthplace of Confederation" and "Cradle of Confederation". Its capital and largest city is Charlottetown. It is one of the three Maritime provinces and one of the four Atlantic provinces.

Historically, the island formed an integral part of the Mi'kmaw homeland, Mi'kma'ki, comprising one part of the district Epekwitk aq Piktuk (also spelled Epegwitg aq Pigtug, lit. 'PEI and Pictou'). In 1604, Epekwitk was colonized by the French as part of the colony of Acadia, where it became known as Isle St-Jean (St. John's Island). It was later ceded to the British at the conclusion of the Seven Years' War in 1763 and became part of the colony of Nova Scotia. In 1769, St. John's Island became its own British colony and its name was changed to Prince Edward Island (PEI) in 1798. PEI hosted the Charlottetown Conference in 1864 to discuss a union of the Maritime provinces; however, the conference became the first in a series of meetings which led to Canadian Confederation on July 1, 1867. Prince Edward Island initially balked at Confederation but, facing bankruptcy from the Land Question and construction of a railroad, joined as Canada's seventh province on July 1, 1873.

According to Statistics Canada, the province of Prince Edward Island had 182,989 residents in 2026. Farming is central to the island's economy; it produces 25% of Canada's potatoes. Other important industries include fisheries, tourism, aerospace, biotechnology, information technology and renewable energy. As Prince Edward Island is one of Canada's older settled areas, its population still reflects the origins of its earliest settlers, with Acadian, Scottish, Irish, and English surnames being dominant. Prince Edward Island is located in the Gulf of St. Lawrence, about ten kilometres (6.2 mi) across the Northumberland Strait from both Nova Scotia and New Brunswick.

It is about 200 kilometres (120 mi) north of Halifax and 600 kilometres (370 mi) east of Quebec City. It has a land area of 5,686.03 square kilometres (2,195.39 sq mi), and is the 104th-largest island in the world and Canada's 23rd-largest island. It is the only Canadian province consisting entirely of islands. However, according to the United States Geological Survey, Esri, and the United Nations Environment Programme – World Conservation Monitoring Centre, as of 2026, the area of the main island is 5,740.96 km^{2} (2,216.60 sq mi), making it the 105th largest island worldwide.

== Etymology ==
The island is known in Mi'kmawi'simk, the indigenous Mi'kmaw language, as Abegweit or Epekwitk, roughly translated as "land cradled on the waves". When the island was part of Acadia, originally settled by French colonists, its French name was Île Saint-Jean ('St. John's Island'). In French, the island is today called Île-du-Prince-Édouard (ÎPÉ). The island was split from the British colony of Nova Scotia in 1769, and renamed in 1798 after Prince Edward, Duke of Kent and Strathearn (1767–1820), the fourth son of King George III and, in 1819, father of the future Queen Victoria. Thus, Prince Edward has been called "Father of the Canadian Crown". In Scottish Gaelic, the island's name is Eilean a' Phrionnsa (lit. 'the Island of the Prince', the local form of the longer Eilean a' Phrionnsa Iomhair/Eideard) or Eilean Eòin (literally, 'John's Island' in reference to the island's former French name) for some Gaelic speakers in Nova Scotia, though not on PEI.

== Geology ==
Topographical map of Prince Edward Island

Between 250 and 300 million years ago, freshwater streams flowing from ancient mountains brought silt, sand and gravel into what is now the Gulf of St. Lawrence. These sediments accumulated to form a sedimentary basin, and make up the island's bedrock. When the Pleistocene glaciers receded about 15,000 years ago, glacial debris such as till were left behind to cover most of the area that would become the island. This area was connected to the mainland by a strip of land, but when ocean levels rose as the glaciers melted, this land strip was flooded, forming the island. As the land rebounded from the weight of the ice, the island rose up to elevate it farther from the surrounding water.

Although commercial deposits of minerals have not been found, exploration in the 1940s for natural gas beneath the northeastern end of the province resulted in the discovery of an undisclosed quantity of gas. The Island was reported by government to have only 0.08 tcf of "technically recoverable" natural gas. Twenty exploration wells for hydrocarbon resources have been drilled on Prince Edward Island and offshore. The first reported well was Hillsborough No.#1, drilled in Charlottetown Harbour in 1944 (the world's first offshore well), and the most recent was New Harmony No.#1 in 2007. Since the resurgence of exploration in the mid-1990s, all wells that have shown promising gas deposits have been stimulated through hydraulic fracture or "fracking". All oil and natural gas exploration and exploitation activities on the Island are governed by the Oil and Natural Gas Act R.S.P.E.I. 1988, Cap. 0-5 and its associated regulations and orders.

== Geography ==
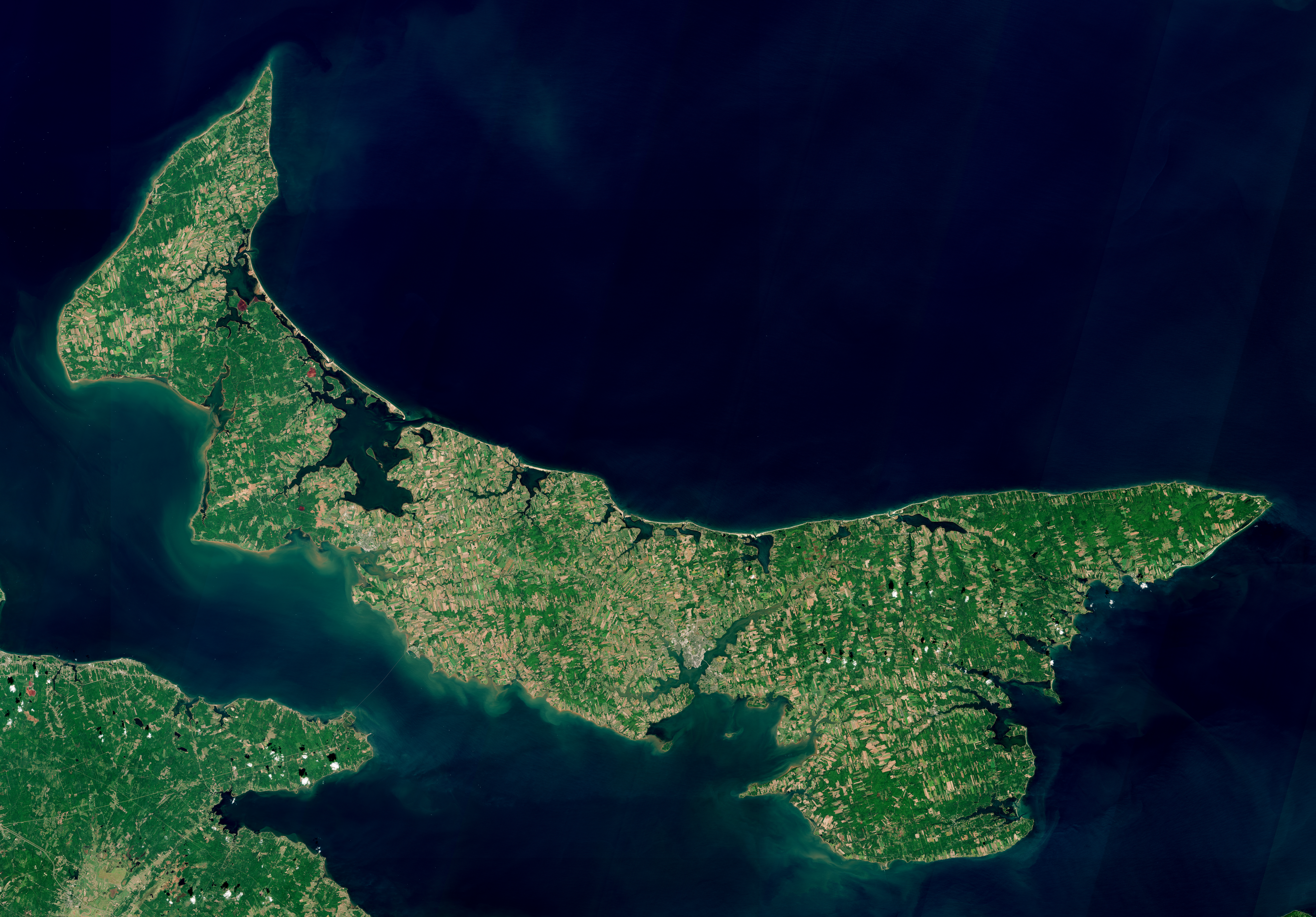
Satellite picture of Prince Edward Island

Prince Edward Island is located in the Gulf of St. Lawrence, west of Cape Breton Island, north of the Nova Scotia peninsula, and northeast of New Brunswick. Its southern shore bounds the Northumberland Strait. The island has two urban areas, and in total, is the most densely populated province in Canada.

=== Climate ===
The island has a maritime climate, moderate and strongly influenced by the surrounding Gulf of St. Lawrence. As such, it is generally milder than many areas of New Brunswick and Nova Scotia due to the warmer waters of the Gulf of St. Lawrence. The climate is characterized by changeable weather throughout the year; in which specific weather conditions seldom last for long.

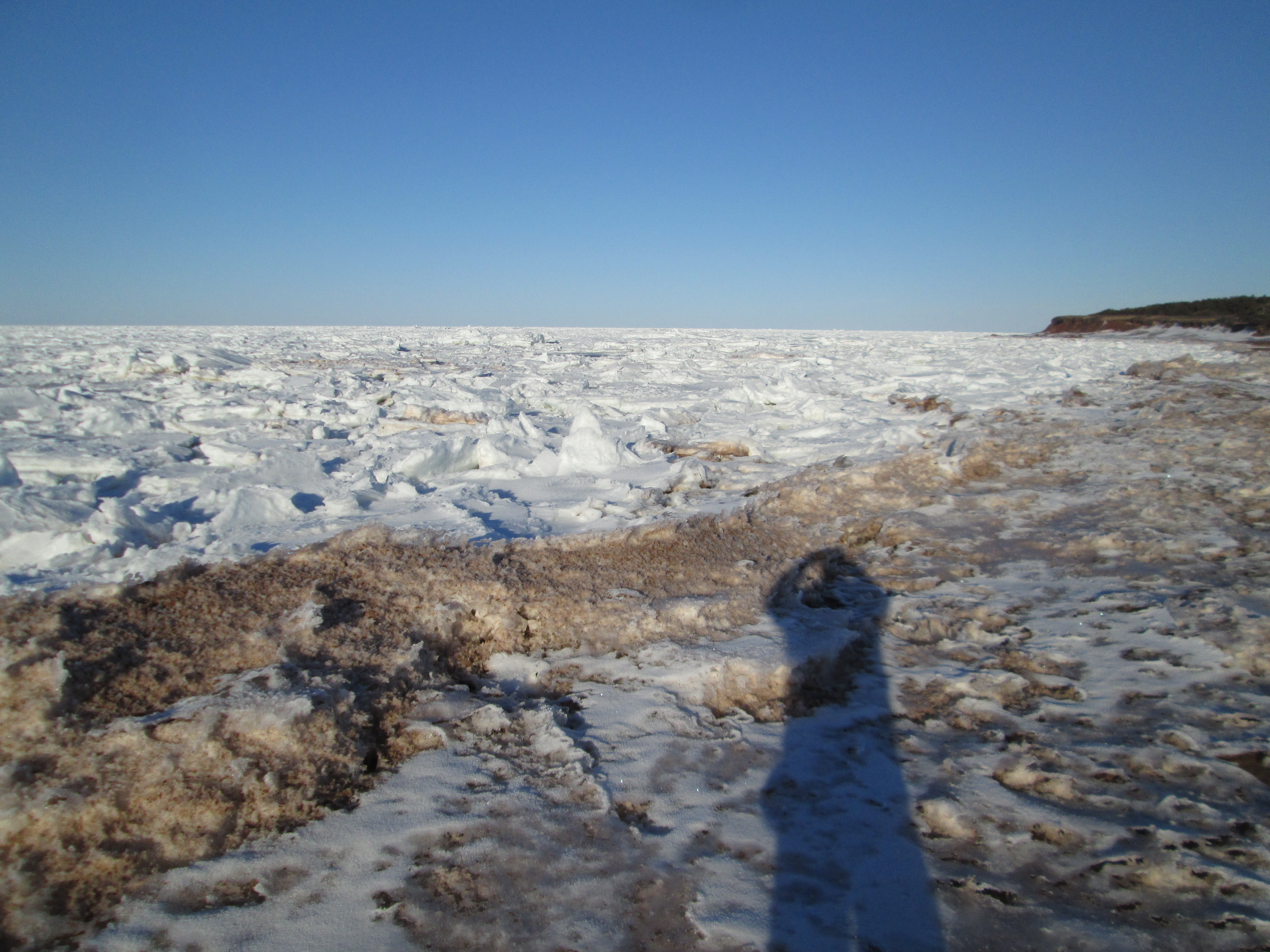
Because the Gulf of Saint Lawrence freezes over, the island's climate is similar to a continental climate as opposed to an oceanic climate.

During July and August, the average daytime high in PEI is 23 °C (73 °F); however, the temperature can sometimes exceed 30 °C (86 °F) during these months. In the winter months of January and February, the average daytime high is −3.3 °C (26 °F). The Island receives an average yearly rainfall of 855 millimetres (33.7 in) and an average yearly snowfall of 2.85 metres (9.4 ft). Winters are moderately cold and long but are milder than inland locations, with clashes of cold Arctic air and milder Atlantic air causing frequent temperature swings. The climate is considered to be more humid continental climate than oceanic since the Gulf of St. Lawrence freezes over, thus eliminating any moderation. The mean temperature is −7 °C (19 °F) in January. During the winter months, the island usually has many storms (which may produce rain as well as snow) and blizzards since during this time, storms originating from the North Atlantic or the Gulf of Mexico frequently pass through. Springtime temperatures typically remain cool until the sea ice has melted, usually in late April or early May. The following climate chart depicts the average conditions of Charlottetown, as an example of the province's climate.

Climate data for Charlottetown Airport, 1981–2010 normals, extremes 1872–present (Note: Extreme high and low temperatures in the table below are from Charlottetown (April 1872 to December 1934), Charlottetown CDA (January 1935 to March 1943), and Charlottetown Airport (April 1943 to present).)
Month	Jan	Feb	Mar	Apr	May	Jun	Jul	Aug	Sep	Oct	Nov	Dec	Year
Record high °C (°F)	15.1 (59.2)	13.3 (55.9)	24.5 (76.1)	26.7 (80.1)	31.7 (89.1)	32.2 (90.0)	33.9 (93.0)	36.7 (98.1)	31.5 (88.7)	27.8 (82.0)	21.3 (70.3)	16.7 (62.1)	36.7 (98.1)
Mean daily maximum °C (°F)	−3.4 (25.9)	−2.9 (26.8)	0.9 (33.6)	7.2 (45.0)	14.3 (57.7)	19.4 (66.9)	23.3 (73.9)	22.8 (73.0)	18.6 (65.5)	12.3 (54.1)	6.3 (43.3)	0.5 (32.9)	9.9 (49.8)
Daily mean °C (°F)	−7.7 (18.1)	−7.3 (18.9)	−3.1 (26.4)	3.1 (37.6)	9.2 (48.6)	14.5 (58.1)	18.7 (65.7)	18.3 (64.9)	14.1 (57.4)	8.3 (46.9)	2.9 (37.2)	−3.3 (26.1)	5.7 (42.3)
Mean daily minimum °C (°F)	−12.1 (10.2)	−11.7 (10.9)	−7.0 (19.4)	−1.2 (29.8)	4.1 (39.4)	9.6 (49.3)	14.1 (57.4)	13.7 (56.7)	9.6 (49.3)	4.4 (39.9)	−0.5 (31.1)	−7.0 (19.4)	1.3 (34.3)
Record low °C (°F)	−32.8 (−27.0)	−30.6 (−23.1)	−27.2 (−17.0)	−16.1 (3.0)	−6.7 (19.9)	−1.1 (30.0)	2.8 (37.0)	2.0 (35.6)	−0.6 (30.9)	−6.7 (19.9)	−17.2 (1.0)	−28.1 (−18.6)	−32.8 (−27.0)
Average precipitation mm (inches)	101.0 (3.98)	83.2 (3.28)	86.3 (3.40)	83.7 (3.30)	91.0 (3.58)	98.8 (3.89)	79.9 (3.15)	95.7 (3.77)	95.9 (3.78)	112.2 (4.42)	112.5 (4.43)	118.1 (4.65)	1,158.2 (45.60)
Average rainfall mm (inches)	34.1 (1.34)	29.8 (1.17)	44.1 (1.74)	59.7 (2.35)	87.2 (3.43)	98.8 (3.89)	79.9 (3.15)	95.7 (3.77)	95.9 (3.78)	110.3 (4.34)	93.0 (3.66)	58.6 (2.31)	887.1 (34.93)
Average snowfall cm (inches)	73.3 (28.9)	58.3 (23.0)	44.1 (17.4)	24.4 (9.6)	3.7 (1.5)	0.0 (0.0)	0.0 (0.0)	0.0 (0.0)	0.0 (0.0)	1.7 (0.7)	19.2 (7.6)	65.6 (25.8)	290.4 (114.3)
Average precipitation days (≥ 0.2 mm)	19.3	15.7	15.9	15.3	14.1	13.2	12.6	11.7	12.8	15.0	16.9	19.8	182.4
Average rainy days (≥ 0.2 mm)	6.3	5.0	7.5	11.6	13.8	13.2	12.6	11.7	12.8	14.6	13.0	8.6	130.8
Average snowy days (≥ 0.2 cm)	17.3	13.7	12.2	6.4	0.93	0.0	0.0	0.0	0.03	1.0	6.4	15.3	73.2
Mean monthly sunshine hours	108.9	109.1	141.3	148.2	197.1	219.8	253.6	219.0	181.0	123.9	62.9	75.8	1,840.5
Percentage possible sunshine	38.8	37.6	38.3	36.5	42.5	46.6	53.2	49.9	47.9	36.5	22.1	28.1	39.8
Source: Environment Canada

=== Water supply ===
The Province of Prince Edward Island is completely dependent on groundwater for its source of drinking water, with approximately 305 high capacity wells in use as of December 2018. As groundwater flows through an aquifer, it is naturally filtered. The water for the city of Charlottetown is extracted from thirteen wells in three wellfields and distributed to customers. The water removed is replenished by precipitation.

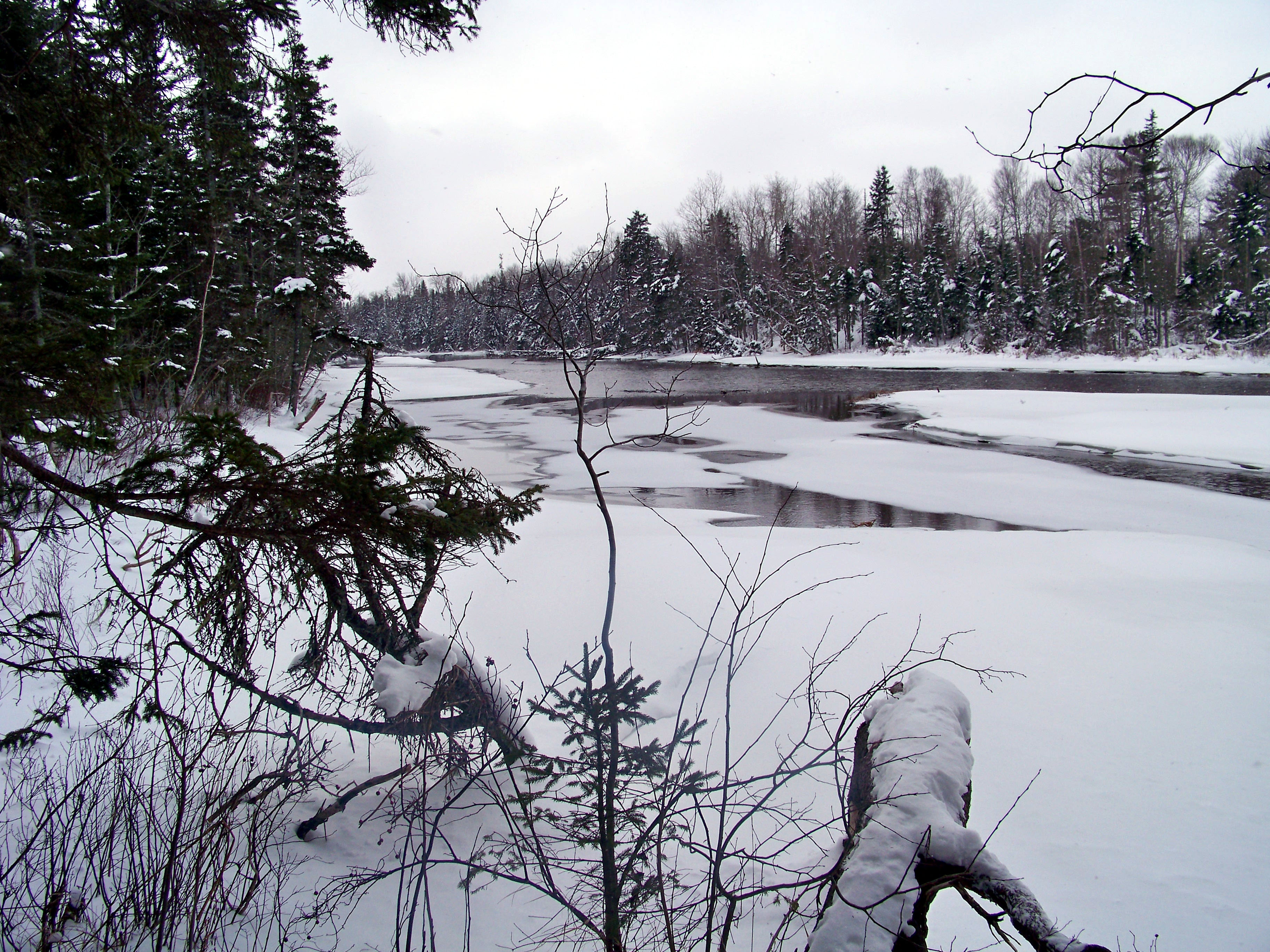
The Winter River in February 2014. The river provides about 92 per cent of Charlottetown's water supply.

Infrastructure in Charlottetown that was installed in 1888 is still in existence. With the age of the system in the older part of Charlottetown, concern has been raised regarding lead pipes. The Utility has been working with its residents on a lead-replacement program. A plebiscite in 1967 was held in Charlottetown over fluoridation, and residents voted in favour. Under provincial legislation, the Utility is required to report to its residents on an annual basis. It is also required to do regular sampling of the water and an overview is included in each annual report. The Wintere River watershed provides about 92 per cent of the daily 18-thousand-cubic-metre (4.8-million-US-gallon) water supply for the city of Charlottetown, which had difficulty in each of 2011, 2012 and 2013 with its supply, until water meters were installed. Government tabled a discussion paper on the proposed Water Act for the province on July 8, 2015. The use of groundwater came under scrutiny as the potato industry, which accounts for $1 billion every year and 50% of farm receipts, has pressed the government to lift a moratorium on high-capacity water wells for irrigation. The release of the discussion paper was to set off a consultation process in the autumn of 2015. Detailed information about the quality of drinking water in PEI communities and watersheds can be found on the provincial government's official website. It provides a summary of the ongoing testing of drinking water done by the Prince Edward Island Analytical Laboratories. Average drinking-water quality results are available, and information on the following parameters are provided: alkalinity; cadmium; calcium; chloride; chromium; iron; magnesium; manganese; nickel; nitrate; pH; phosphorus; potassium; sodium; and sulfate, as well as the presence of pesticides. Water-testing services are provided for a variety of clients through the PEI Analytical Laboratories which assesses according to the recommendations of the Guidelines for Canadian Drinking Water Quality published by Health Canada.

=== Flora and fauna ===
Prince Edward Island used to have native moose, bear, caribou, wolf, and other larger species. Due to hunting and habitat disruption these species are no longer found on the island. Some species common to P.E.I. are red foxes, coyote, blue jays, and robins. Skunks and raccoons are common non-native species. Species at risk in P.E.I. include piping plovers, American eel, bobolinks, little brown bat, and beach pinweed. Some species are unique to the province. In 2008, a new ascomycete species, Jahnula apiospora (Jahnulales, Dothideomycetes), was collected from submerged wood in a freshwater creek on Prince Edward Island. North Atlantic right whales, one of the rarest whale species, once thought to be rare visitors into St. Lawrence regions until 1994, have been showing dramatic increases (annual concentrations were discovered off Percé in 1995 and gradual increases across the regions since 1998), and since 2014, notable numbers of whales have been recorded around Cape Breton to Prince Edward Island as 35 to 40 whales were seen in these areas in 2015.

== History ==
=== Mi'kmaw district ===
The Mi'kmaq are the Indigenous inhabitants of what is now Prince Edward Island. The island is part of a broader area known Mi'kma'ki, homeland of the Mi'kmaq, which overlaps with several Canadian provinces and has some legal autonomy and legal protections. The island's land base formed one part of the district Epekwitk aq Piktuk (also spelled Epegwitg aq Pigtug). Named "Epekwitk" (and rendered as "Abegweit" in English)—meaning "cradled on the waves"—the island was historically governed by Saqamaq, or community chiefs, a women's council (Saqama'sgw), and wampum keepers (Putu's). The district eventually fell under the jurisdiction of the Sante' (or Mi'kmawey) Mawio'mi and the Grand Chief, or Kji Sagamaw.

Today, Epekwitk (aq Piktuk), along with the other seven districts of Mi'kma'ki, are protected by the Peace and Friendship Treaties that the Mi'kmaq have with the Crown. However, rather than district-level governance, administration is currently overseen by band governments. On Epekwitk, the two communities are the Abegweit and Lennox Island First Nations.

The earliest stories of the Mi'kmaq go back to the time of Glooscap, a cultural hero and first human in Wabanaki mythology. Big in size and power, Mi'kmaw legend says that when Glooscap finished painting the splendour of the world, he dipped his brush into a blend of all the colours and created his favourite island of Epekwitk. When Glooscap slept, Enmigtaqamu'g (or mainland Nova Scotia) was his bed and Epekwitk his pillow. Another legend tells us that Minegoo—another name for the island, meaning, simply, "island" in Mi'kmawi'simk—was formed by the Great Spirit placing on the Blue Waters some dark red crescent-shaped clay. Mi'kmaw oral history recalls a time when the world was covered in water. It was then that the being Sebanees, arriving in kjiktu’lnu ("our great boat"), landed on the shores of Epekwitk. The boat, made of ice, carried all the animals and fish his family would need for survival, and it is said that Epekwitk's unique land formation was a result of the melting of the ice boat. Archaeological evidence, such as shell middens and campsite remains, corroborate Mi'kmaw stories which indicate an ancient presence in Epekwitk. Prior to European colonization of the Americas, Mi'kmaq engaged in varied relations with neighbouring nations, such as the Wolastoqiyik (Maliseet), Passamaquoddy, and Abenaki, with whom they formed the Wabanaki Confederacy in Dawnland.

=== French colony ===
French explorer Jacques Cartier was the first known European to see the island, in 1543. In 1604, the Kingdom of France laid claim to the lands of the Maritimes under the discovery doctrine, including Prince Edward Island, establishing the French colony of Acadia in Mi'kma'ki. The island was named Île Saint-Jean (St. John's Island) by the French. The Mi'kmaq never recognized the claim but welcomed the French as trading partners and allies.

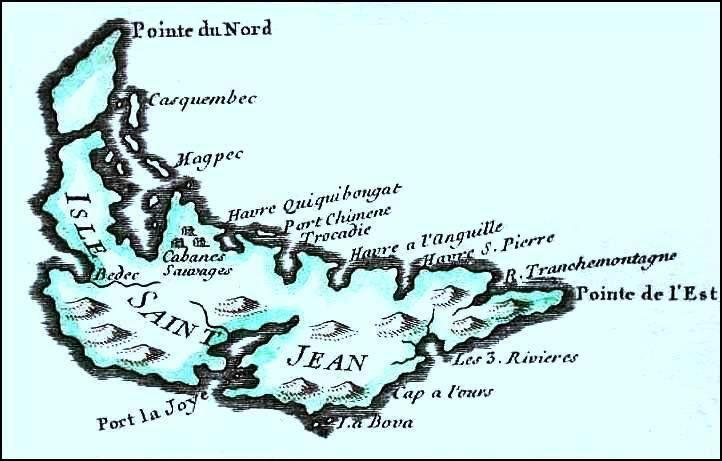
Map of Prince Edward Island and French settlements c. 1744

During the 18th century, the French were engaged in a series of conflicts with the Kingdom of Great Britain and its colonies. Several battles between the two belligerents occurred on Prince Edward Island during this period. Following the British capture of Louisbourg during the War of the Austrian Succession, New Englanders launched an attack on Île Saint-Jean (now Prince Edward Island); with a British detachment landed at Port-la-Joye. The island's capital had a garrison of 20 French soldiers under the command of Joseph du Pont Duvivier. The troops fled the settlement, and the New Englanders burned the settlement to the ground. Duvivier and the twenty men retreated up the Northeast River (Hillsborough River), pursued by the New Englanders until the French troops were reinforced with the arrival of the Acadian militia and the Mi'kmaq. The French troops and their allies were able to drive the New Englanders to their boats. Nine New Englanders were killed, wounded or made prisoner. The New Englanders took six Acadian hostages, who would be executed if the Acadians or Mi'kmaq rebelled against New England control. The New England troops left for Louisbourg. Duvivier and his 20 troops left for Quebec. After the fall of Louisbourg, the resident French population of Île Royale (now Cape Breton Island) were deported to France, with the remaining Acadians of Île Saint-Jean living under the threat of deportation for the remainder of the war. New Englanders had a force of 200 soldiers stationed at Port-La-Joye, as well as two warships boarding supplies for its journey of Louisbourg. To regain Acadia, Ramezay was sent from Quebec to the region to join forces with the Duc d'Anville expedition. Upon arriving at Chignecto, he sent Boishebert to Île Saint-Jean to ascertain the size of the New England force. After Boishebert returned, Ramezay sent Joseph-Michel Legardeur de Croisille et de Montesson along with over 500 men, 200 of whom were Mi'kmaq, to Port-La-Joye. In July 1746, the battle happened near York River. Montesson and his troops killed forty New Englanders and captured the rest. Montesson was commended for having distinguished himself in his first independent command. Hostilities between the British and French were ended in 1748 with the Treaty of Aix-la-Chapelle in 1748.

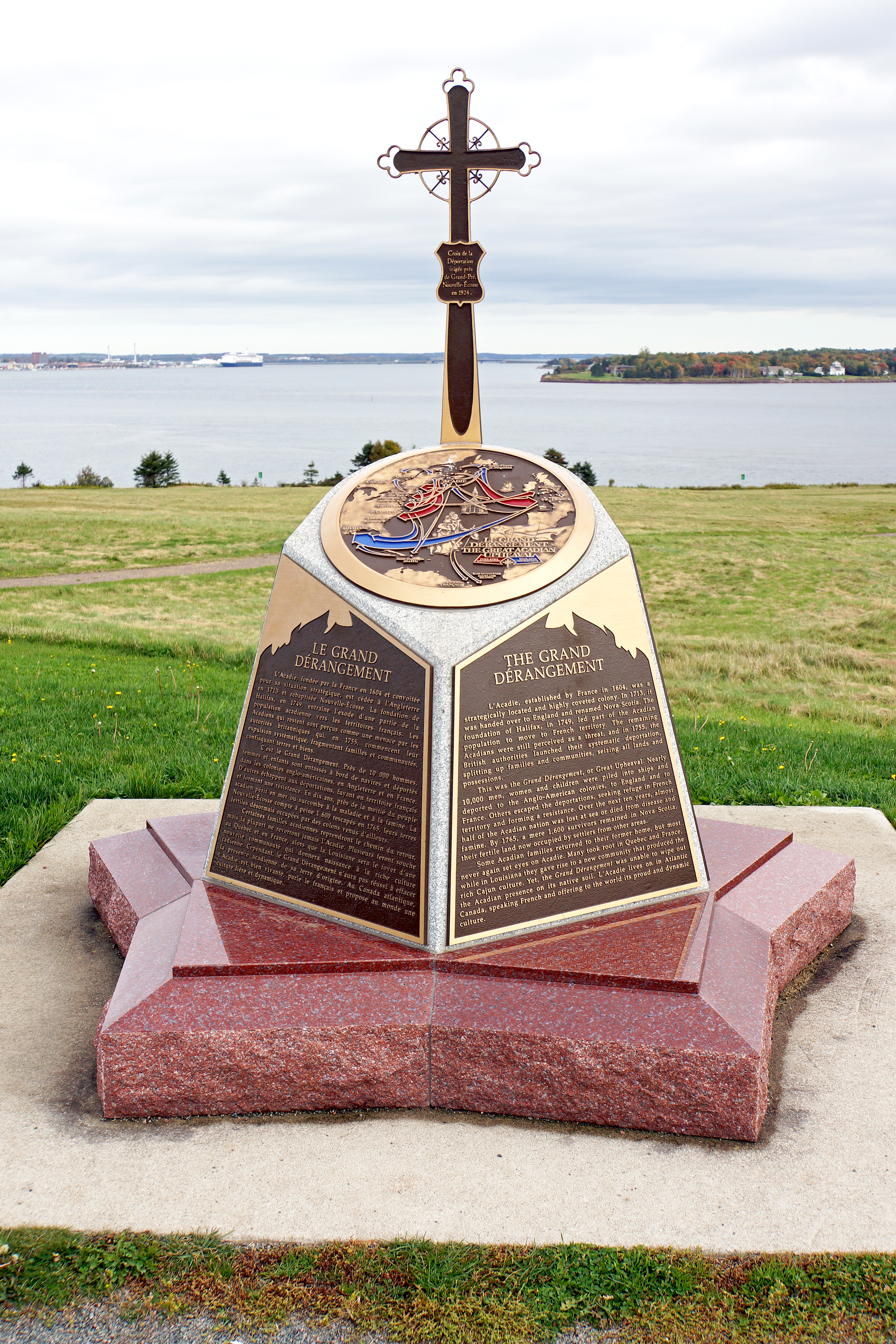
Monument for the Acadian expulsion in Prince Edward Island. A large number of Acadians were forcibly removed from the island in the mid 18th century.

Roughly one thousand Acadians lived on the island prior to the Acadian Exodus from Nova Scotia. The population grew to nearly 5,000 the late 1740s and early 1750s, as Acadians from Nova Scotia fled to the island during the Acadian Exodus, and the subsequent British-ordered expulsions beginning in 1755. Hostilities between British and French colonial forces resumed in 1754, although formal declarations of war were not issued until 1756. After French forces were defeated at the siege of Louisbourg, the British performed a military campaign on Ile Saint-Jean (now Prince Edward Island) to secure the island. The campaign was led by Colonel Andrew Rollo under orders from General Jeffery Amherst. The following campaigns saw the deportation of most Acadians from the island. Many Acadians died in the expulsion en route to France; on December 13, 1758, the transport ship Duke William sank and 364 died. A day earlier the Violet sank and 280 died; several days later Ruby sank with 213 on board. The French formally ceded the island, and most of New France to the British in the Treaty of Paris of 1763.

=== British colony ===
Initially named St. John's Island by the British, the island was administered as part of the colony of Nova Scotia until it was split into a separate colony in 1769. In the mid-1760s, a survey team led by Samuel Holland divided the Island into 67 lots. On July 1, 1767, these properties were allocated to supporters of King George III by means of a lottery. Ownership of the land remained in the hands of landlords in England, angering Island settlers who were unable to gain title to the land on which they worked and lived. Significant rent charges to absentee landlords created further anger. The land had been given to the absentee landlords with a number of conditions attached regarding upkeep and settlement terms, many of which were not satisfied. Islanders spent decades trying to convince the Crown to confiscate the lots; however, the descendants of the original owners were generally well-connected to the British government and refused to give up the land. After the island was detached from Nova Scotia to become a separate colony, Walter Patterson was appointed the first British governor of St. John's Island in 1769. Assuming the office in 1770, he had a controversial career during which land title disputes and factional conflict slowed the initial attempts to populate and develop the island under a feudal system. In an attempt to attract settlers from Ireland, in one of his first acts (1770), Patterson led the island's colonial assembly to rename the island "New Ireland", but the British Government promptly vetoed this as it exceeded the authority vested in the colonial government; only the Privy Council in London could change the name of a colony.

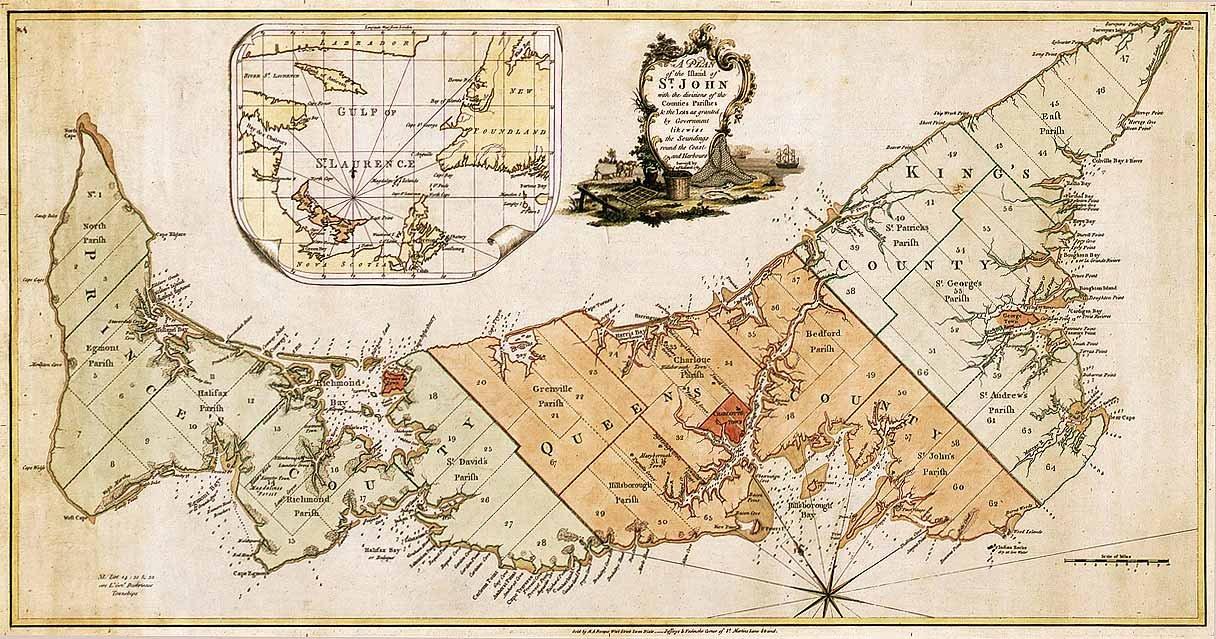
Map of the island with lot boundaries in 1775. The island was divided into lots in 1767.

During the American Revolutionary War Charlottetown was raided in 1775 by a pair of American-employed privateers. Two armed schooners, Franklin and Hancock, from Beverly, Massachusetts, made prisoner of the attorney-general at Charlottetown, on advice given them by some Pictou residents after they had taken eight fishing vessels in the Gut of Canso. During and after the American Revolutionary War, from 1776 to 1783, the colony's efforts to attract exiled Loyalist refugees from the rebellious North American colonies met with some success. Walter Patterson's brother, John Patterson, one of the original grantees of land on the island, was a temporarily exiled Loyalist and led efforts to persuade others to come. Governor Patterson's dismissal in 1787 and his recall to London in 1789 dampened his brother's efforts, leading John to focus on his interests in the United States. Edmund Fanning, also a Loyalist exiled by the Revolution, took over as the second governor, serving until 1804. His tenure was more successful than Patterson's. A large influx of Scottish Highlanders in the late 1700s also resulted in St. John's Island having the highest proportion of Scottish immigrants in Canada. This led to a higher proportion of Scottish Gaelic speakers and a thriving culture surviving on the island than in Scotland itself, as the settlers could more easily avoid English influence overseas. On November 29, 1798, during Fanning's administration, the British government approved changing the colony's name from St. John's Island to Prince Edward Island to distinguish it from areas with similar names in what is now Atlantic Canada, such as the cities of Saint John in New Brunswick and St. John's in Newfoundland. The colony's new name honoured the fourth son of King George III, Prince Edward Augustus, the Duke of Kent (1767–1820), who subsequently led the British military forces on the continent as Commander-in-Chief, North America (1799–1800), with his headquarters in Halifax. In 1853, the Island government passed the Land Purchase Act, which empowered them to purchase lands from those owners who were willing to sell, and then resell the land to settlers for low prices. This scheme collapsed when the Island ran short of money to continue with the purchases. Many of these lands were also fertile, and were some of the key factors to sustaining Prince Edward Island's economy.

=== Confederation ===
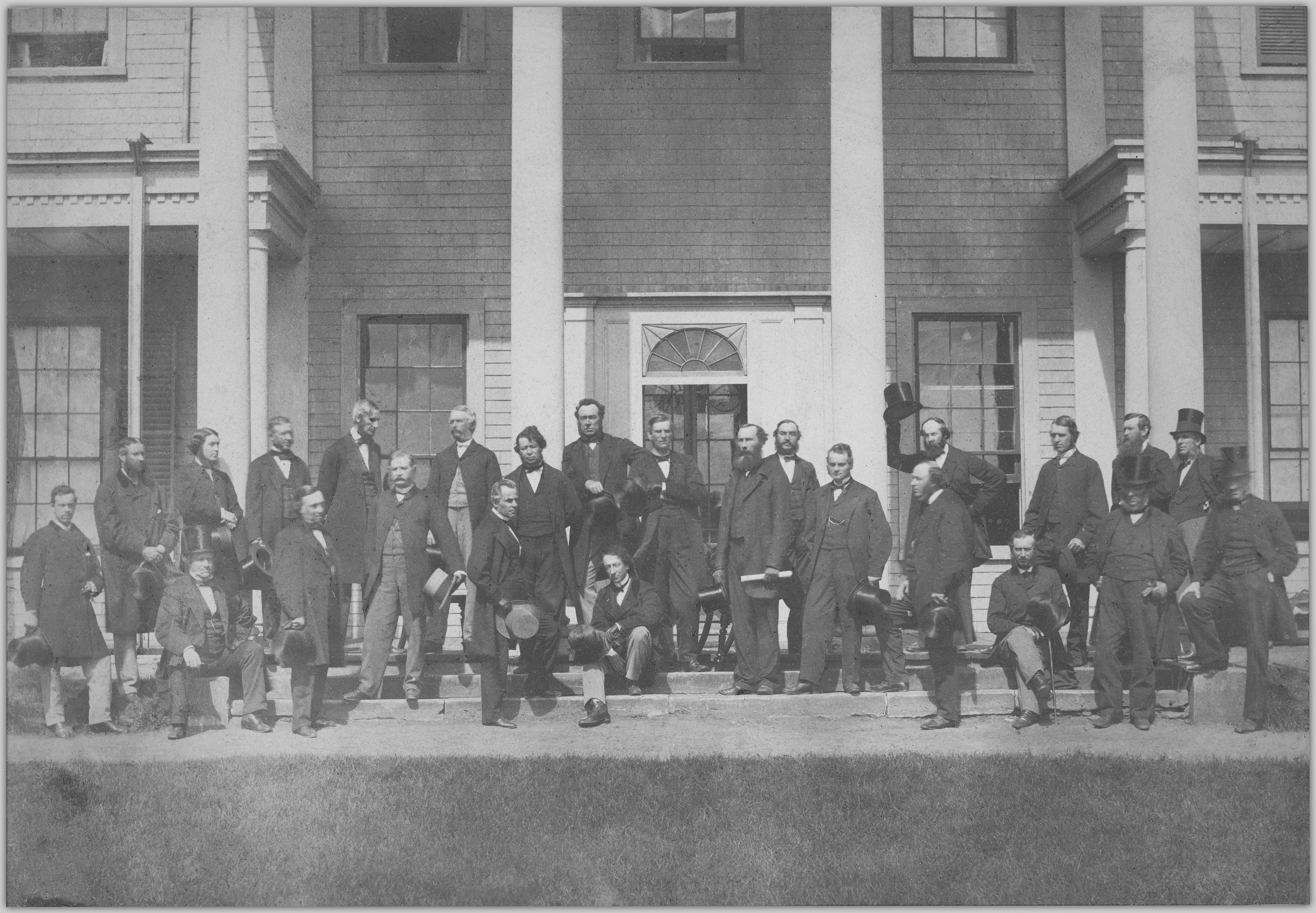
Delegates of the Charlottetown Conference in 1864. Although PEI hosted a conference, it did not join the Confederation until 1873.

From September 1 to 7, 1864, Prince Edward Island hosted the Charlottetown Conference, which was the first meeting in the process leading to the Quebec Resolutions and the creation of Canada in 1867. Prince Edward Island found the terms of union unfavourable and balked at joining in 1867, choosing to remain a colony of the United Kingdom. In the late 1860s, the colony examined various options, including the possibility of becoming a discrete dominion unto itself, as well as entertaining delegations from the United States, who were interested in Prince Edward Island joining the United States. In 1871, the colony began construction of the Prince Edward Island Railway (PEIR) and, frustrated by Great Britain's Colonial Office, began negotiations with the United States. In 1873, Canadian Prime Minister John A. Macdonald, anxious to thwart American expansionism and facing the distraction of the Pacific Scandal, negotiated for Prince Edward Island to join Canada. The Dominion Government of Canada assumed the colony's extensive railway debts and agreed to finance a buy-out of the last of the colony's absentee landlords to free the island of leasehold tenure and from any new immigrants entering the island (accomplished through the passage of the Land Purchase Act, 1875). Prince Edward Island entered Confederation on July 1, 1873.

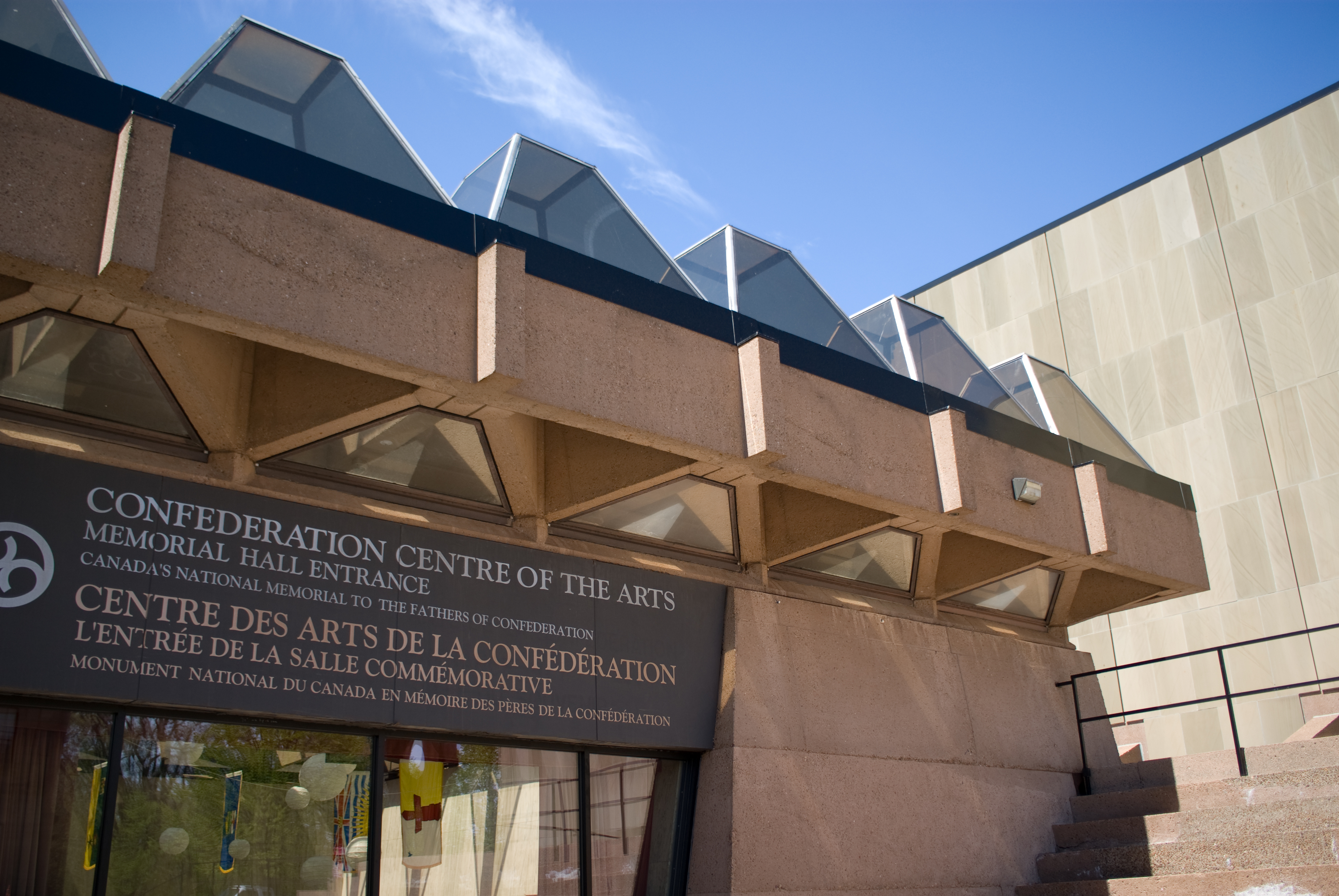
The Confederation Centre of the Arts was completed in 1964, and commemorates the centenary of Confederation.

As a result of having hosted the inaugural meeting of Confederation, the Charlottetown Conference, Prince Edward Island presents itself as the "Birthplace of Confederation" and this is commemorated through several buildings, a ferry vessel, and the Confederation Bridge (constructed 1993 to 1997). The most prominent building in the province honouring this event is the Confederation Centre of the Arts, presented as a gift to Prince Edward Islanders by the 10 provincial governments and the Federal Government upon the centenary of the Charlottetown Conference, where it stands in Charlottetown as a national monument to the "Fathers of Confederation". The centre is one of the 22 National Historic Sites of Canada located in Prince Edward Island.

== Demographics ==
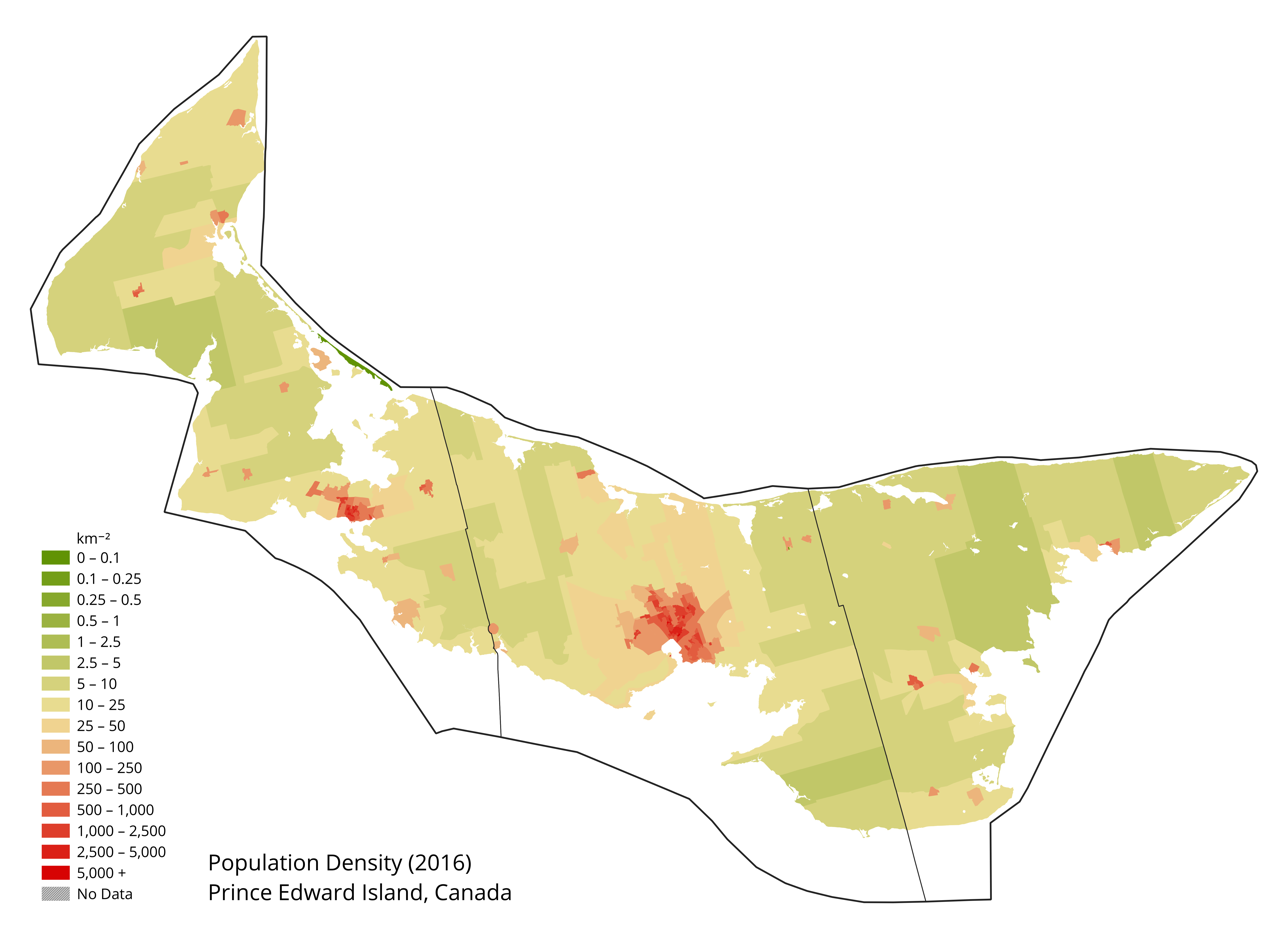
Population density of Prince Edward Island (c. 2016) with county borders shown.

Historical populations
Year	Pop.	±%
1851	62,678	—
1861	80,857	+29.0%
1871	94,021	+16.3%
1881	108,891	+15.8%
1891	109,078	+0.2%
1901	103,259	−5.3%
1911	93,728	−9.2%
1921	88,615	−5.5%
1931	88,038	−0.7%
1941	95,047	+8.0%
1951	98,429	+3.6%
1956	99,285	+0.9%
1961	104,629	+5.4%
1966	108,535	+3.7%
1971	111,635	+2.9%
1976	118,225	+5.9%
1981	122,506	+3.6%
1986	126,640	+3.4%
1991	129,765	+2.5%
1996	134,557	+3.7%
2001	135,294	+0.5%
2006	135,851	+0.4%
2011	140,204	+3.2%
2016	142,907	+1.9%
2021	154,331	+8.0%
Source: Statistics Canada

=== Ethnicity ===
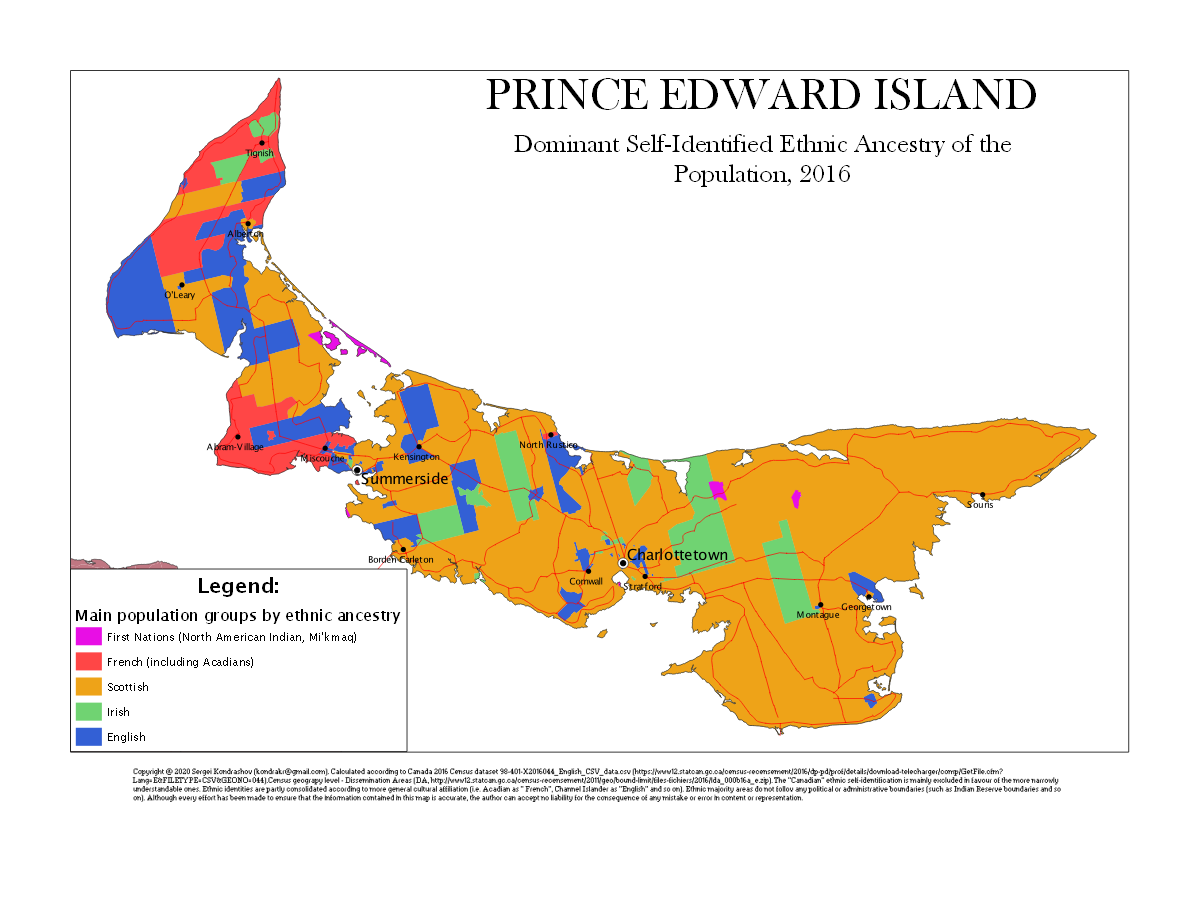
Dominant self-identified ethnic origin of the population of Prince Edward Island

According to the 2016 Canadian Census of the 139,690 people who self-identified with an ethnic origin, 98,615 were of European origins and 85,145 chose British Isles Origins. The largest ethnic group consists of people of Scottish descent (36%), followed by English (29%), Irish (28%), French (21%), German (5%), and Dutch (3%) descent. Prince Edward Island's population is largely white; there are few visible minorities. Chinese Canadians are the largest visible minority group of Prince Edward Island, comprising 1.3% of the province's population. Almost half of respondents identified their ethnicity as "Canadian". * among provinces.
† Preliminary 2006 census estimate.
Source: Statistics Canada

=== Language ===
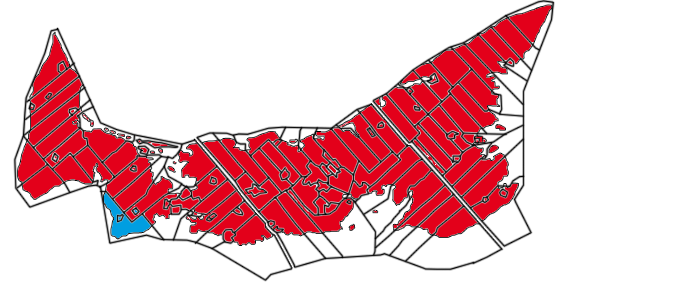
Languages of Prince Edward Island (red: English, blue: French). Evangeline Region is the only Francophone majority area on the island.

As of the 2021 Canadian census, the ten most spoken languages in the province included English (149,525 or 99.36%), French (19,445 or 12.92%), Mandarin (2,940 or 1.95%), Hindi (1,660 or 1.1%), Tagalog (1,630 or 1.08%), Punjabi (1,550 or 1.03%), Spanish (1,425 or 0.95%), Arabic (1,165 or 0.77%), German (1,040 or 0.69%), and Vietnamese (785 or 0.52%). The question on knowledge of languages allows for multiple responses. The 2016 Canadian census showed a population of 142,910. Of the 140,020 singular responses to the census question concerning mother tongue, the most commonly reported languages were as follows:

Rank	Language	Number	Percent
1.	English	128,005	94.9%
2.	French	4,865	3.5%
3.	Mandarin	2,165	1.6%
4.	Arabic	575	0.4%
5.	Dutch	465	0.3%
6.	Tagalog	365	0.3%
7.	German	320	0.2%
8.	Spanish	305	0.2%
9.	Chinese languages, not otherwise specified	295	0.2%
10.	Cantonese	210	0.2%
11.	Nepali	200	0.1%
12.	Persian (Farsi)	175	0.1%
13.	Russian	140	0.1%
14.	Korean	120	< 0.1%

In addition, there were 460 responses of both English and a "non-official language"; 30 of both French and a "non-official language"; 485 of both English and French; and 20 of English, French, and a "non-official language". (Figures shown are for the number of single language responses and the percentage of total single-language responses.)

=== Religion ===
According to the 2021 census, religious groups in Prince Edward Island included:

- Christianity (101,755 persons or 67.6%)
- Irreligion (42,830 persons or 28.5%)
- Islam (1,720 persons or 1.1%)
- Hinduism (1,245 persons or 0.8%)
- Sikhism (1,165 persons or 0.8%)
- Buddhism (755 persons or 0.5%)
- Judaism (165 persons or 0.1%)
- Indigenous Spirituality (75 persons or <0.1%)
- Other (765 persons or 0.5%)

Traditionally, the population has been evenly divided between Catholic and Protestant affiliations. The 2001 census indicated number of adherents for the Roman Catholic Church with 63,240 (47%) and various Protestant churches with 57,805 (43%). This included the United Church of Canada with 26,570 (20%); the Presbyterian Church with 7,885 (6%) and the Anglican Church of Canada with 6,525 (5%); those with no religion were among the lowest of the provinces with 8,705 (6.5%). If one considers that the founders of the United Church of Canada were largely Presbyterians in Prince Edward Island, the Island has one of the highest percentages of Presbyterians in the country. Since 2016 there are two Amish settlements on Prince Edward Island.

== Economy ==
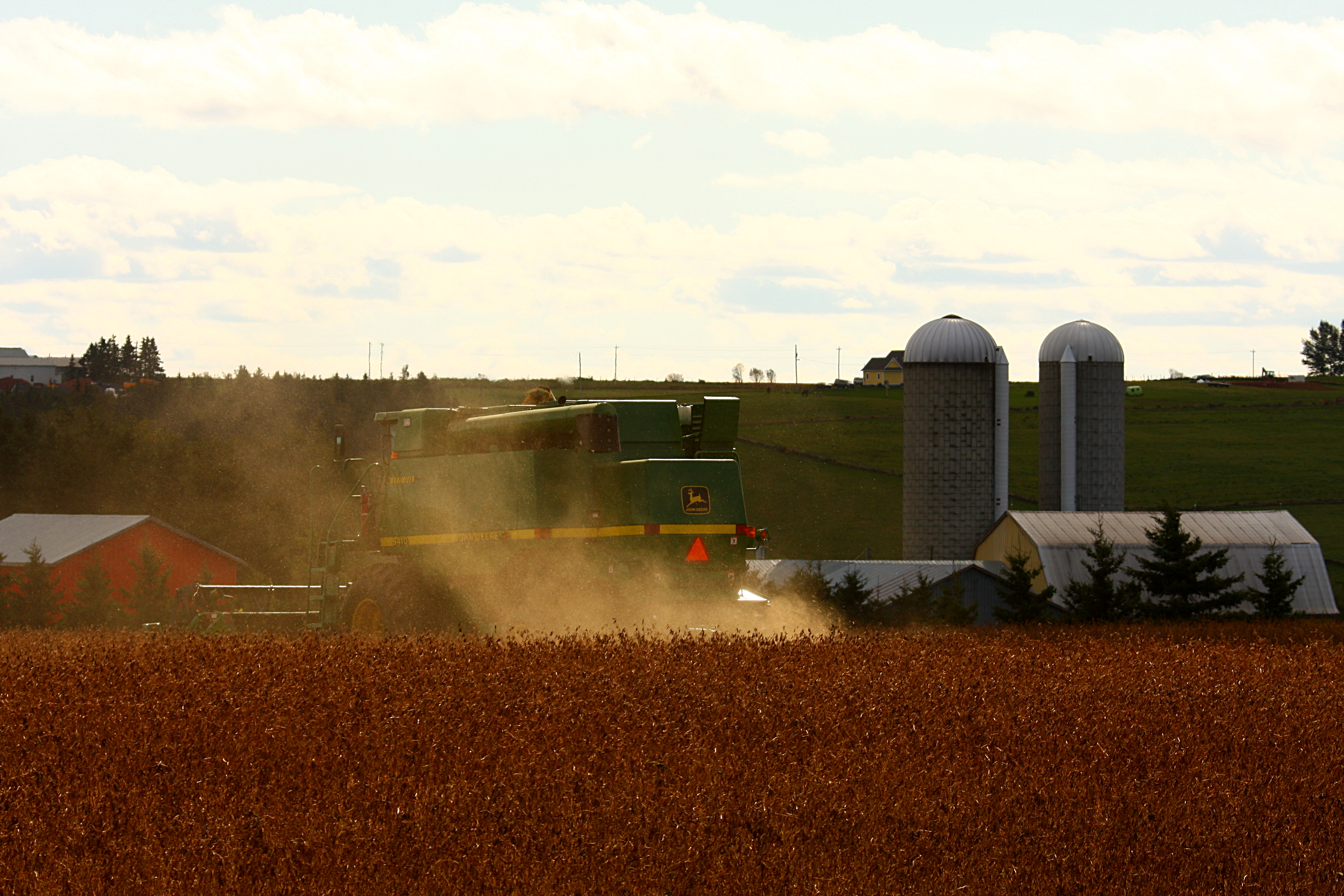
A harvester at work in a soybean field. Agriculture remains a major part of the province's economy.

Agriculture remains the dominant industry in the provincial economy, as it has since colonial times. In 2015, agriculture and agri-food manufacturing was responsible for 7.6% of the province's GDP. The Island has a total land area of 1.4 million acres (570,000 hectares) with approximately 594,000 acres (240,383 hectares) cleared for agricultural use. In 2016, the Census of Agriculture counted 1,353 farms on the Island, which is a 9.5% decrease from the previous census (2011). During the 20th century, potatoes were grown as a cash crop across more than a million acres of farmland. Traditionally, crops were grown on a rotational basis: common examples would be either potatoes, hay, clover, or oats being grown on a piece of land at any given time. More recently, the total amount of farms used for potatoes has decreased, but the province is still Canada's largest supplier of the crop. The number of acres under potato production in 2010 was 88,000, while soy accounted for 55,000. There are approximately 330 potato growers on PEI, with the grand majority of these being family farms, often with multiple generations working together. The province currently accounts for a quarter of Canada's total potato production, producing approximately 1.3 billion kilograms (1,400,000 short tons) annually. Comparatively, the state of Idaho produces approximately 6.2 billion kilograms (6,800,000 short tons) annually, with a population approximately 9.5 times greater. The province is a major producer of seed potatoes, exporting to more than twenty countries around the world. An estimated total of 70% of the land is cultivated and 25% of all potatoes grown in Canada originate from P.E.I. The processing of frozen fried potatoes, green vegetables, and berries is a leading business activity. As a legacy of the island's colonial history, the provincial government enforces strict rules for non-resident land ownership, especially since the PEI Lands Protection Act of 1982. Residents and corporations are limited to maximum holdings of 400 and 1,200 hectares respectively. There are also restrictions on non-resident ownership of shorelines. Some groups, however, such as the Buddhist organization Bliss and Wisdom, have been accused of exploiting loopholes in the lands protection legislation to purchase vast quantities of land.

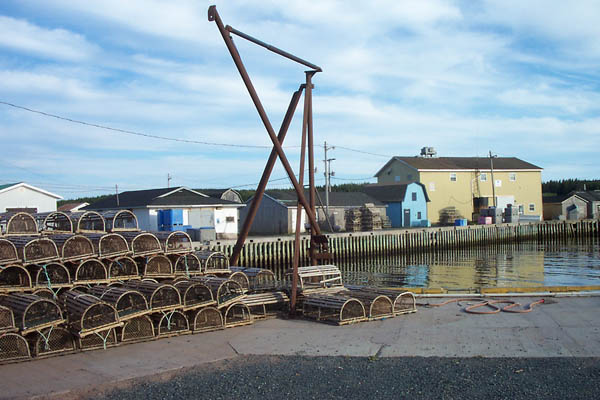
Lobster traps at the harbour of Naufrage. Lobster fishing continues to be a major economic sector for coastal communities.

Many of the province's coastal communities rely upon shellfish harvesting, particularly lobster fishing as well as oyster fishing and mussel farming. The island's economy has grown significantly over the last decade in key areas of innovation. Aerospace, bioscience, information and communications technology, and renewable energy have been a focus for growth and diversification. Aerospace alone now accounts for over 25% of the province's international exports and is the island's fourth largest industry at $355 million in annual sales. The bioscience industry employs over 1,300 people and generates over $150 million in sales. The sale of carbonated beverages such as beer and soft drinks in non-refillable containers, such as aluminum cans or plastic bottles, was banned in 1976 as an environmental measure in response to public concerns over litter. Beer and soft drink companies opted to use refillable glass bottles for their products which were redeemable at stores and bottle depots. Though often environmental and economic agendas may be at odds, the 'ban the can' legislation, along with being environmentally driven, was also economically motivated as it protected jobs. Seaman's Beverages, a bottling company and carbonated beverage manufacturer, was established in 1939 and a major employer in Charlottetown, Prince Edward Island. Making it illegal to retail cans led to a bigger share of the carbonated beverage market for Seamans. Seamans Beverages was eventually acquired by Pepsi Bottling Group Inc in 2002 prior to the lifting of the legislation.

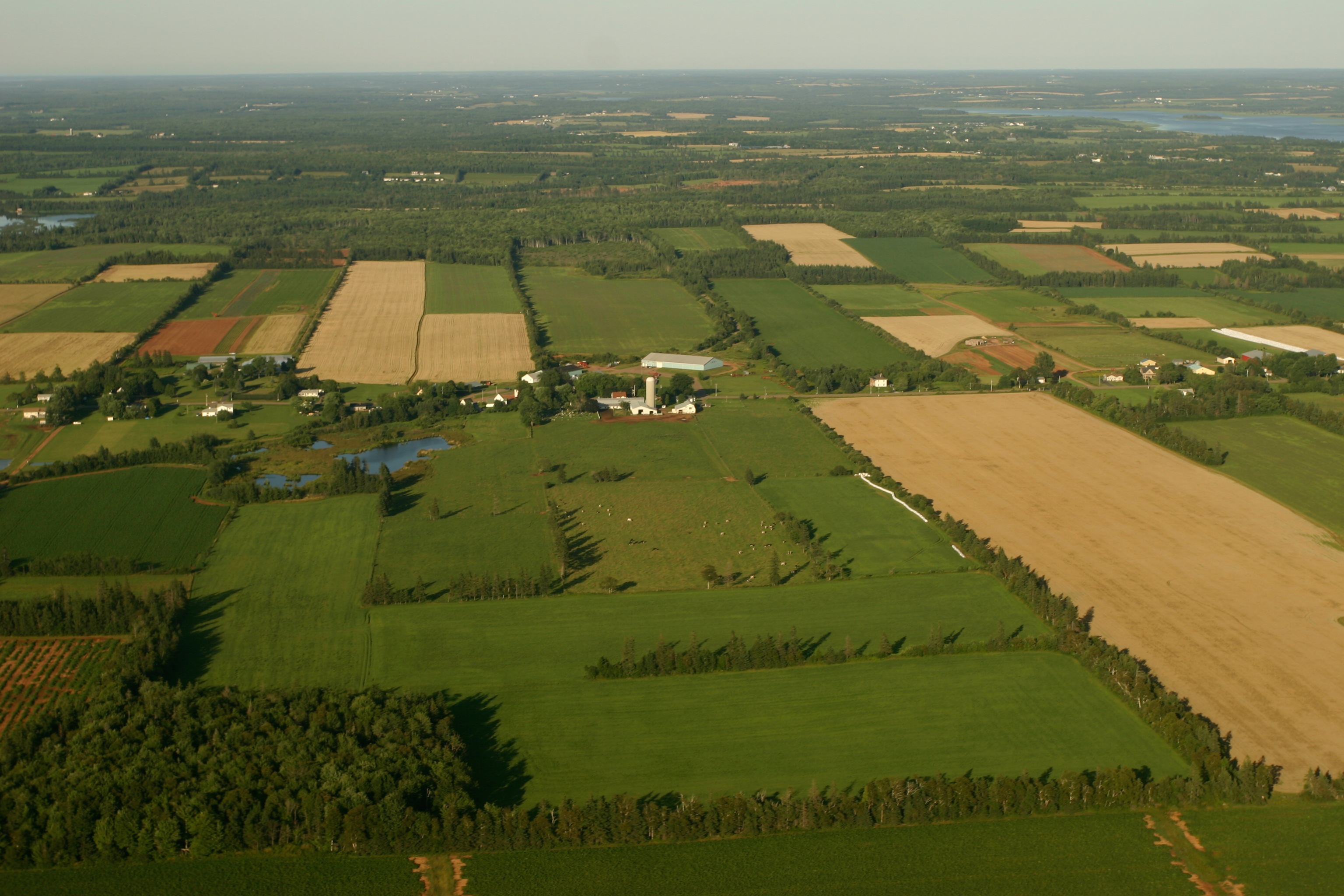
Farming on Prince Edward Island

The introduction of recycling programs for cans and plastic bottles in neighbouring provinces in recent years (also using a redemption system) has seen the provincial government introduce legislation to reverse this ban with the restriction lifted on May 3, 2008. Prior to harmonization in 2013, Prince Edward Island had one of Canada's highest provincial retail sales tax rates at 10%. On April 1, 2013, the provincial tax was harmonized with the federal Goods and Services Tax, and became known as the harmonized sales tax. The 15% tax is applied to almost all goods and services except some clothing, food and home heating fuel. This rate is the same as the neighbouring Atlantic provinces, with the exception of Nova Scotia. The provincial government provides consumer protection in the form of regulation for certain items, ranging from apartment rent increases to petroleum products including gas, diesel, propane and heating oil. These are regulated through the Prince Edward Island Regulatory and Appeals Commission (IRAC). IRAC is authorized to limit the number of companies who are permitted to sell petroleum products. As of 2015, the median family income on Prince Edward Island is $76,607/year. The minimum wage is $16.00/hour as of October 1, 2024.

=== Energy ===
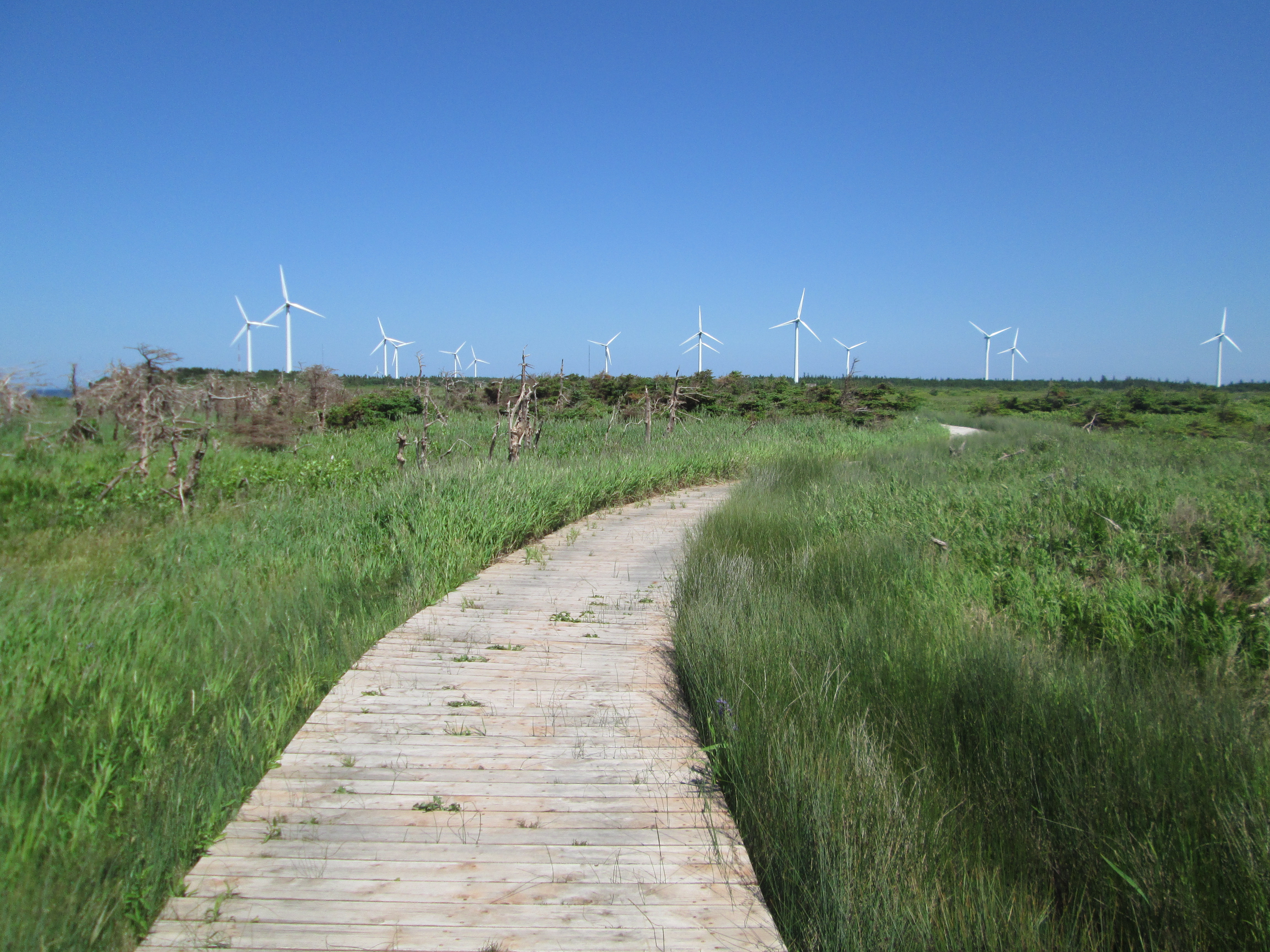
A wind farm at North Cape

Since 1918, Maritime Electric has delivered electricity to customers on the Island. The utility is currently owned and operated by Fortis Inc. Approximately twenty-five percent of electricity consumed on the island is generated from renewable energy (largely wind turbines); the provincial government had set a renewable energy target for 30–50% for electricity consumed by 2015, though this goal has not been met. The total capacity of wind power on the island is 204 MW from 89 turbines. There are eight wind farms on the island, the largest being West Cape Wind Park with a capacity of 99 MW from 55 turbines. All of the turbines have been manufactured by Vestas: the Vestas V-80, Vestas V90, and Vestas V-47. A thermal oil-fired generating station, the Charlottetown Thermal Generating Station, is used sometimes for emergencies. It is being decommissioned. A second thermal generation station exists in Borden, the Borden Generating Station. The majority of electricity consumed on Prince Edward Island comes from New Brunswick through undersea cables. A recent $140M upgrade brought the capacity of the cable system from 200 MW to 560 MW. The Point Lepreau nuclear plant in New Brunswick was closed for refurbishments from 2008 to 2012, resulting in a steep price hike of about 25 per cent, but the province later subsidized rates. Residents were to pay 11.2 per cent more for electricity when the harmonized sales tax was adopted in April 2013, according to the P.E.I. Energy Accord that was tabled in the legislature on December 7, 2012. and passed as the Electric Power (Energy Accord Continuation) Amendment Act, which establishes electric pricing from April 1, 2013, to March 1, 2016. Regulatory powers are derived for IRAC from the Electric Power Act.

== Education ==
Prince Edward Island's public school system has an English school district named the Public Schools Branch (previously the English Language School Board), as well as a Francophone district, the Commission scolaire de langue française. The English language district has a total of 10 secondary schools and 54 intermediate and elementary schools while the Francophone district has 6 schools covering all grades. 22 per cent of the student population is enrolled in French immersion. This is one of the highest levels in the country.

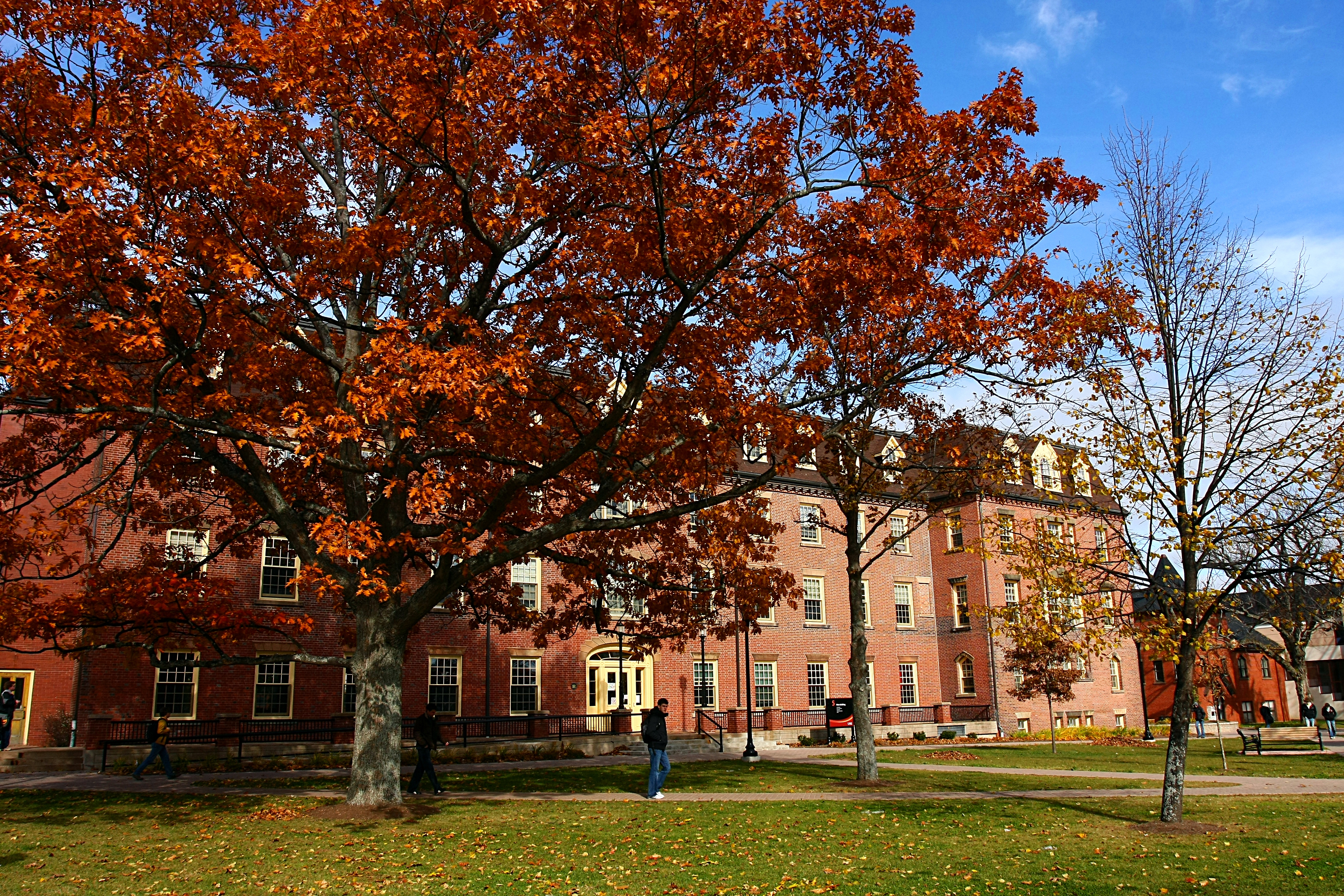
The SDU Main Building at the University of Prince Edward Island, the only university on the island

Three public post-secondary institutions operate in the province, including one university, and two colleges. The University of Prince Edward Island is the province's only public university, and is located in the city of Charlottetown. The university was created by the Island legislature to replace Prince of Wales College and St. Dunstan's University. UPEI is also home to the Atlantic Veterinary College, which offers the region's only veterinary medicine program.

== Government and politics ==
The provincial government is responsible for such areas as health and social services, education, economic development, labour legislation and civil law. These matters of government are overseen in the provincial capital, Charlottetown. Prince Edward Island is governed by a parliamentary government within the construct of constitutional monarchy; the monarchy in Prince Edward Island is the foundation of the executive, legislative, and judicial branches. The sovereign is King Charles III, who also serves as head of state of 14 other Commonwealth countries, each of Canada's nine other provinces, and the Canadian federal realm, and resides in the United Kingdom. As such, the King's representative, the Lieutenant Governor of Prince Edward Island (presently Wassim Salamoun), carries out most of the royal duties in Prince Edward Island.

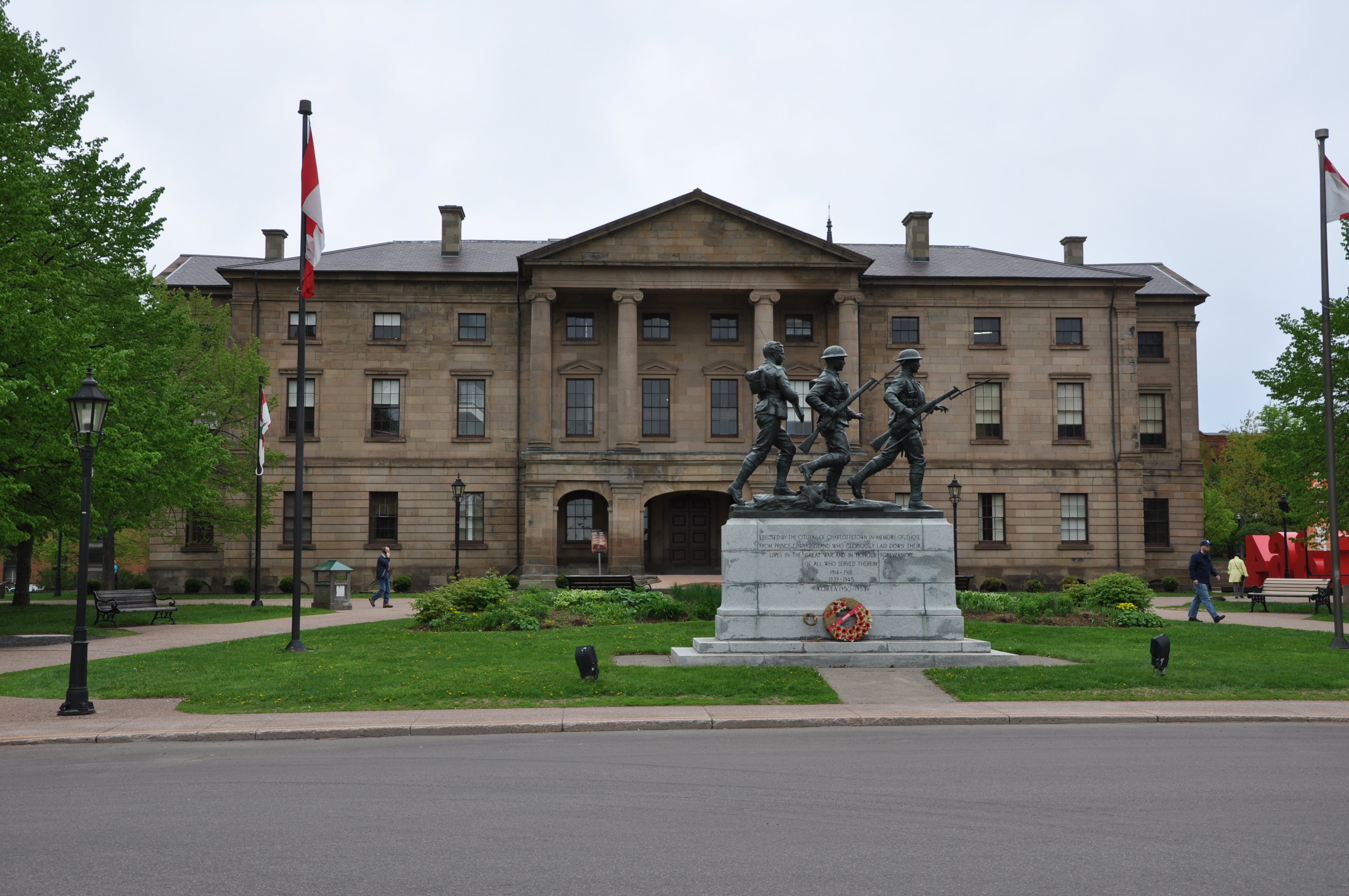
The exterior of Province House, meeting place for the Legislative Assembly of Prince Edward Island

The direct participation of the royal and viceroyal figures in any of these areas of governance is limited; in practice, their use of the executive powers is directed by the Executive Council, a committee of ministers of the Crown responsible to the unicameral, elected Legislative Assembly and chosen and headed by the Premier of Prince Edward Island (presently Rob Lantz), the head of government. To ensure the stability of government, the lieutenant governor will usually appoint as premier the person who is the current leader of the political party that can obtain the confidence of a plurality in the Legislative Assembly. The leader of the party with the second-most seats usually becomes the Leader of His Majesty's Loyal Opposition (presently Hal Perry) and is part of an adversarial parliamentary system intended to keep the government in check. Each of the 27 Members of the Legislative Assembly (MLA) is elected by simple plurality in an electoral district. General elections are called by the lieutenant governor for the first Monday in October four years after the previous election, or may be called earlier on the advice of the premier. Historically, politics in the province have been dominated by the Liberal and the Progressive Conservative Parties since the province joined Confederation. From the 2015 election, the Green Party of Prince Edward Island gained a small representation in the Legislative Assembly, and in the 2019 election gained an additional six seats to form the Official Opposition. The PC party increased its majority in the 2023 election, while the Liberals regained Official Opposition status. The Greens lost six seats, returning to third party status. The Mi'kmaq Confederacy of PEI is the tribal council and provincial-territorial organization in the province that represents both the Lennox Island and Abegweit First Nations.

=== Administrative divisions ===
Prince Edward Island is divided into three counties that have historically been used as administrative divisions for the provincial government, and prior to Confederation (in 1873), the colonial government. Today, the counties are no longer used as administrative boundaries for the provincial government, though they continue to be used as census divisions by Statistics Canada for statistical purposes in administering the Canadian census.

==== Municipalities ====
Municipal statuses in Prince Edward Island are cities, towns, rural municipalities, and resort municipalities. Under Prince Edward Island's Municipal Government Act (MGA), which came into force on December 23, 2017, the formation of a municipality can be proposed by the Minister of Fisheries and Communities, the council of an existing municipality, or a petition signed by 30% of the residents that would be the electors of the new municipality. To be eligible for city or town status, certain minimum estimated population and total property assessment value criteria must be met. If those criteria are not met, rural municipality status can be granted if it is the opinion of the Minister of Fisheries and Communities that it would be in the public interest. The province's lone resort municipality – the Resort Municipality of Stanley Bridge, Hope River, Bayview, Cavendish and North Rustico – was established by order in council in 1990. The 2017 MGA prevents creation of any new resort municipalities.

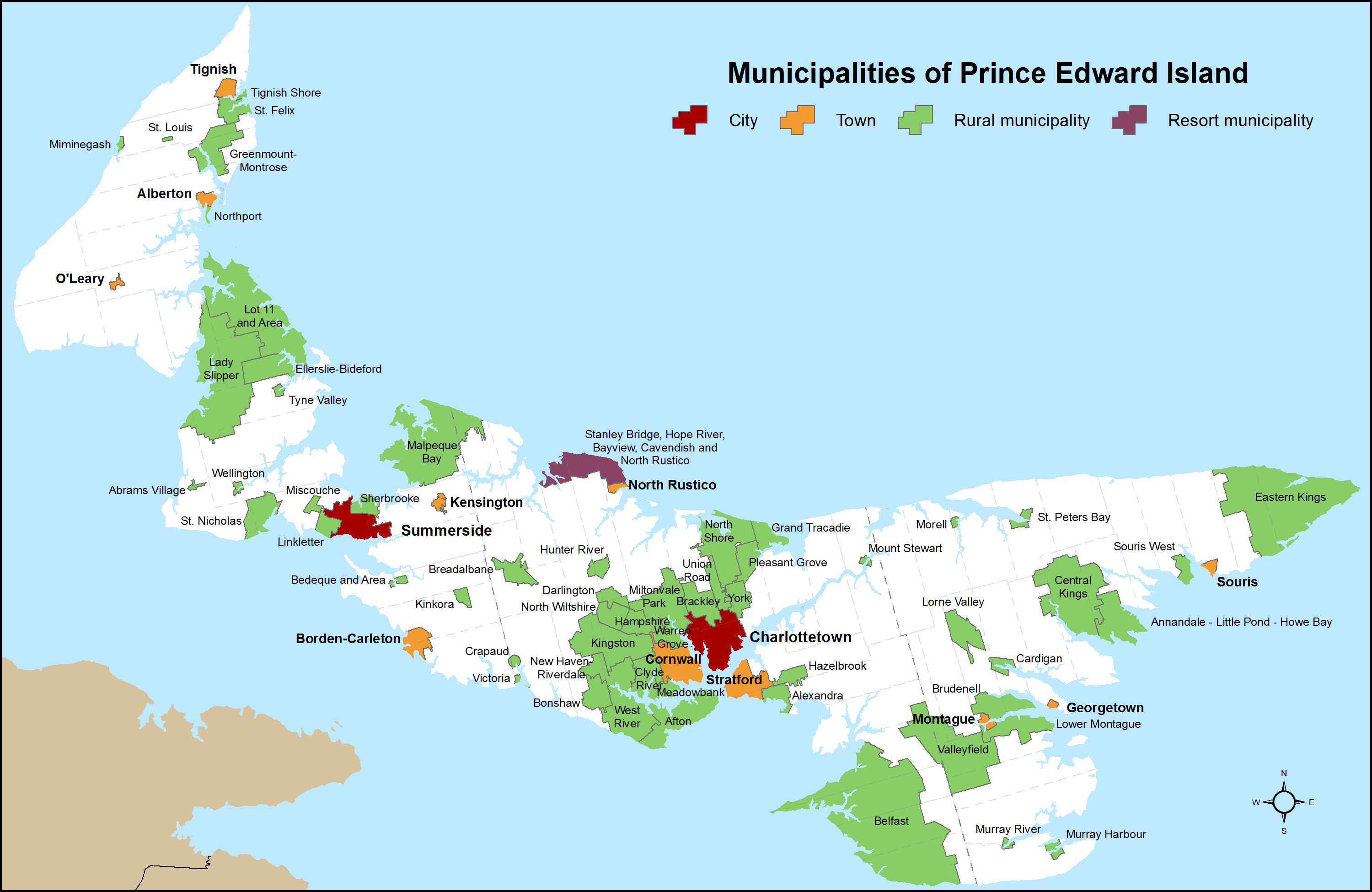
Municipalities of Prince Edward Island

Ten largest communities by population
Community	2011	2001
Charlottetown	32,545^{a}	32,455
Summerside	15,654^{b}	14,433
Stratford	8,043	6,314
Cornwall	5,375	4,412
Montague	2,034^{c}	1,095
Kensington	1,445	1,379
Souris	1,162	1,238
Alberton	1,081	975
Tignish	998	846
Georgetown	678	680
^{a}Census agglomeration population: 58,358.^{b}Census agglomeration population: 16,200.^{c}Census agglomeration population: 6,011.

== Health care and sanitation ==
The province has a single health administrative region (or district health authority) called Health PEI. Health PEI receives funding for its operations and is regulated by the Department of Health and Wellness. Many PEI homes and businesses are served by central sewage collection and treatment systems. These are operated either by a municipality or a private utility. Many industrial operations have their own wastewater treatment facilities. Staff members with the Department of Environment, Water and Climate Change provide advice to operators, as needed, on proper system maintenance. The IRAC regulates municipal water and sewer in the province, now under the Environmental Protection Act. Since around 1900, the residents of the City of Charlottetown have benefited from a central sanitary sewer service. Early disposal practices, while advanced for their time, eventually were found to compromise the ecological integrity of the nearby Hillsborough River and the Charlottetown Harbour. By 1974, the commission had spearheaded the development of a primary wastewater treatment plant, known as the Charlottetown Pollution Control Plant, together with the construction of several pumping stations along the city's waterfront, and outfall piping deep into the Hillsborough River. Until 2016, Prince Edward Island was the only province in Canada that did not provide abortion services through its hospitals. Until that time, the last abortion that had been performed in the province was in 1982 prior to the opening of the Queen Elizabeth Hospital which saw the closure of the Roman Catholic-affiliated Charlottetown Hospital and the non-denominational Prince Edward Island Hospital; a condition of the "merger" being that abortions not be performed in the province. In 1988, following the court decision R. v. Morgentaler, the then-opposition Progressive Conservative Party of Prince Edward Island tabled a motion demanding that the ban on abortions be upheld at the province's hospitals; the then-governing Prince Edward Island Liberal Party under Premier Joe Ghiz acquiesced and the ban was upheld. Until more local access was guaranteed, the Government of Prince Edward Island funded abortions for women who travelled to another province. Women from Prince Edward Island also travelled to the nearest private user-pay clinic, where they were required pay for the procedure using their own funds. Formerly this was the Morgentaler Clinic in Fredericton, New Brunswick until this clinic closed due to lack of funds in July 2014. The clinic was reopened under new ownership in 2016 as Clinic 554 with expanded services. During that gap, women had to travel to Halifax or further. In 2016, the Liberal government led by Premier Wade MacLauchlan announced they would open a women's reproductive health clinic to provide abortions within the province. Abortions are now provided in Prince Edward Island.

== Transportation ==
Prince Edward Island's transportation network has traditionally revolved around its seaports of Charlottetown, Summerside, Borden, Georgetown, and Souris. Before the 20th century, the island's road network was only used by pedestrians, horse-drawn carts and carriages, and by 1908, there were only seven motorized automobiles on the island. In the same year, the Prince Edward Island automobile ban was enacted, banning the use of motor cars due to residents' concerns over their safety, and complaints that the loud vehicles frightened horses and livestock. The ban was partially lifted after a plebiscite in 1913 and completely rescinded in 1919.

The Prince Edward Island Railway, the construction of which started in 1871, connected all major towns of the island and ran from Tignish in the west to Elmira in the east. The railway system was abandoned by CN in 1989 in favour of an agreement with the federal government to improve major highways.

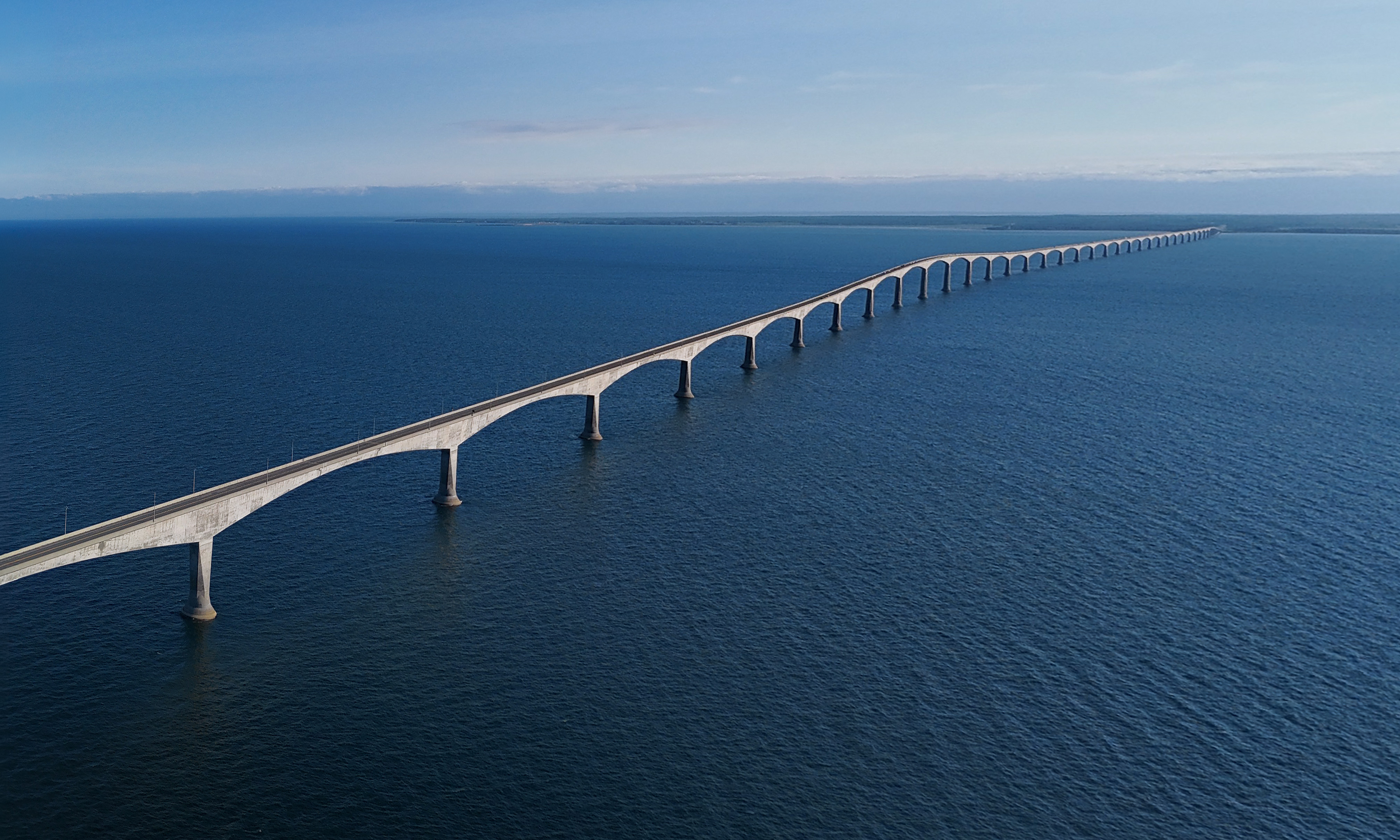
In May 1997, the Confederation Bridge was opened, providing a fixed link between the island and the mainland.

Until May 1997, the province was linked by two passenger-vehicle ferry services to the mainland: one, provided by Marine Atlantic, operated year-round between Borden and Cape Tormentine, New Brunswick; the other, provided by Northumberland Ferries Limited, operates seasonally between Wood Islands and Caribou, Nova Scotia. A third ferry service provided by CTMA operates all year round with seasonal times between Souris and Cap-aux-Meules, Quebec, in the Magdalen Islands. In May 1997, the Confederation Bridge opened, connecting Borden-Carleton to Cape Jourimain, New Brunswick. The world's longest bridge over ice-covered waters, it replaced the Marine Atlantic ferry service. Since then, the Confederation Bridge's assured transportation link to the mainland has altered the province's tourism and agricultural and fisheries export economies.

The island has the highest concentration of roadways in Canada. The provincially managed portion of the network consists of around 4,500 kilometres (2,800 mi) of paved roadways and 1,800 kilometres (1,100 mi) of non-paved or clay roads. The province has very strict laws regarding use of roadside signs. Billboards and the use of portable signs are banned. There are standard direction information signs on roads in the province for various businesses and attractions in the immediate area. The by-laws of some municipalities also restrict the types of permanent signs that may be installed on private property.

The island has two main airports: Several airlines service the Charlottetown Airport (CYYG); the Summerside Airport (CYSU) is an additional option for general aviation.

There is an extensive bicycling and hiking trail that spans the island. The Confederation Trail is a 470 kilometres (290 mi) recreational trail system. It was developed in the 1990s, on the land of the former Prince Edward Island Railway, following the abandonment of all railway lines in the province.

== Culture ==
=== Arts ===
The island's cultural traditions of art, music and creative writing are supported through the public education system. There is an annual arts festival, the Charlottetown Festival, hosted at the Confederation Centre of the Arts.

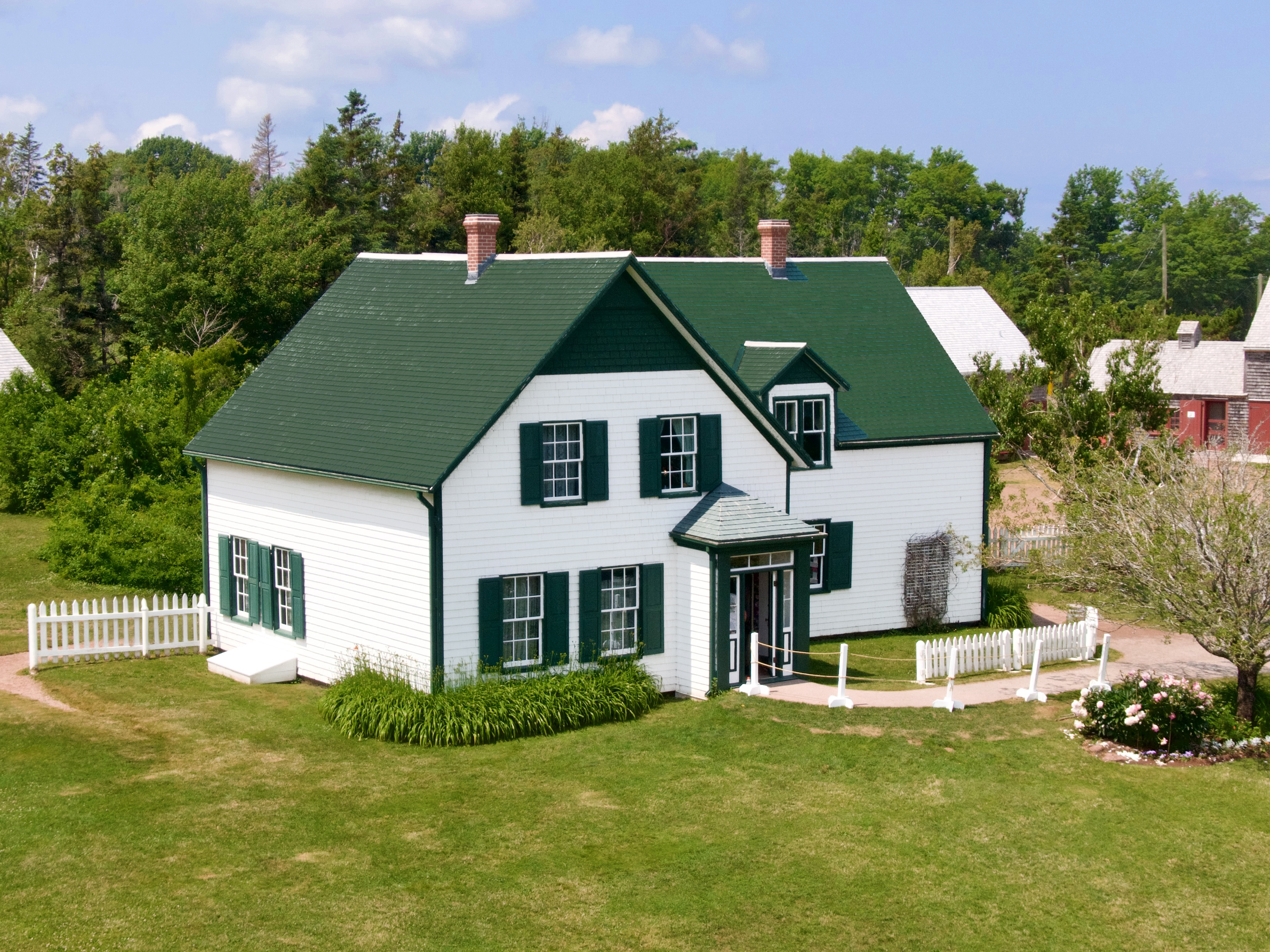
Green Gables in Cavendish was a farm featured in Anne of Green Gables.

Lucy Maud Montgomery, who was born in Clifton (now New London) in 1874, drew inspiration from the land during the late Victorian Era for the setting of her classic novel Anne of Green Gables (1908). The musical play Anne of Green Gables has run every year at the Charlottetown festival for more than four decades. The sequel, Anne & Gilbert, premiered in the Playhouse in Victoria in 2005. The actual location of Green Gables, the house featured in Montgomery's Anne books, is in Cavendish, on the north shore of PEI. Prince Edward Island's documented music history begins in the 19th century with religious music, some written by the local pump and block maker and organ-importer Watson Duchemin. Several big bands including the Sons of Temperance Band and the Charlottetown Brass Band were active. Today, Acadian, Celtic, folk, and rock music prevail, with exponents including Gene MacLellan, his daughter Catherine MacLellan, Al Tuck, Lennie Gallant, Two Hours Traffic and Paper Lions. The celebrated singer-songwriter Stompin' Tom Connors spent his formative years in Skinners Pond. Celtic music is certainly the most common traditional music on the island, with fiddling and step dancing being very common. This tradition, largely Scottish, Irish and Acadian in origin is very similar to the music of Cape Breton and to a lesser extent, Newfoundland and is unique to the region. Due to the Islands influence as a former Highlander Clans Scottish colony, a March 4/4 for bagpipes was composed in honour of Prince Edward Island.

=== Festivals ===
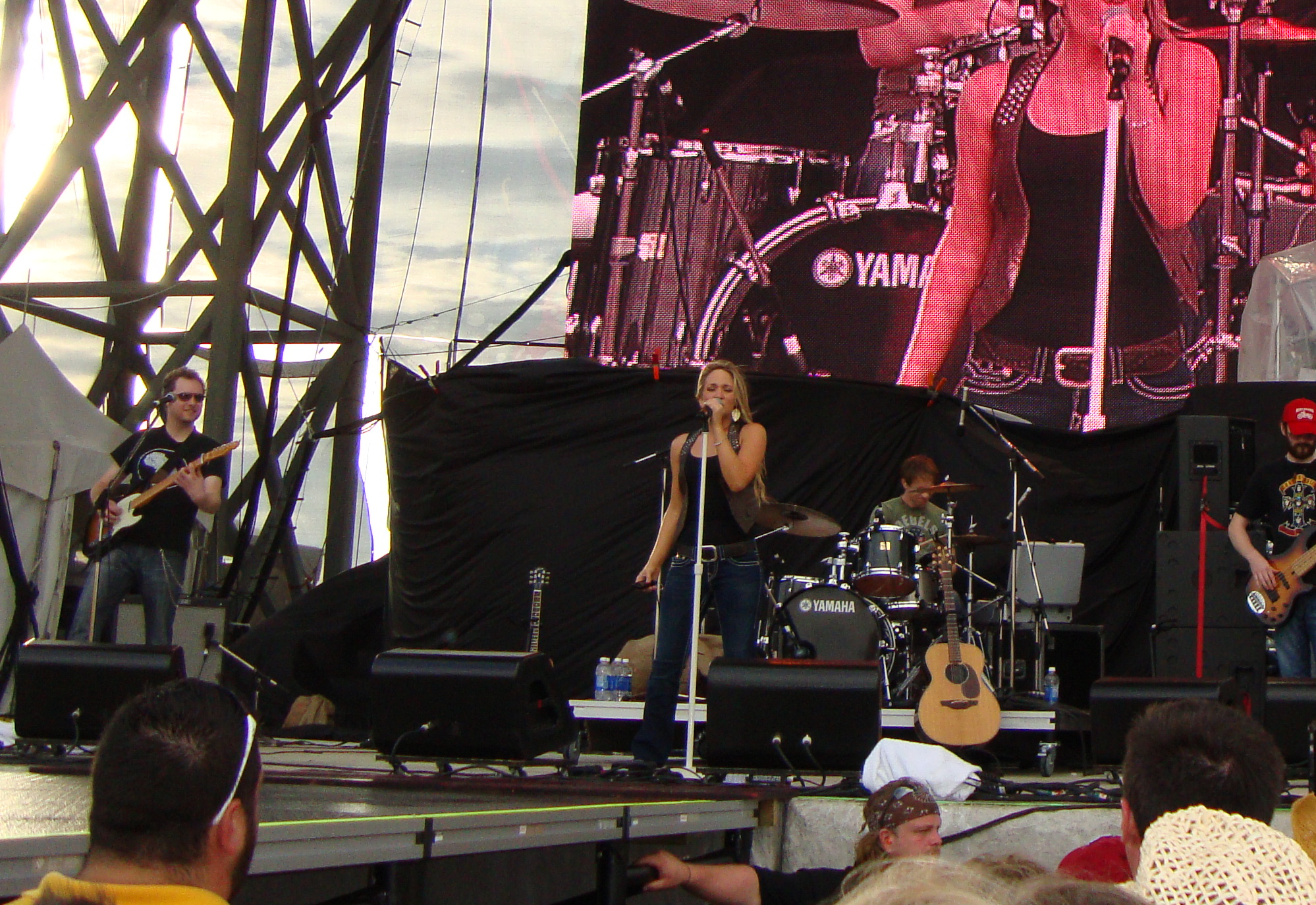
The Cavendish Beach Music Festival is an annual music festival held in mid-July.

There is an annual arts festival, the Charlottetown Festival, hosted at the Confederation Centre of the Arts as well as the Island Fringe Festival that takes place around Charlottetown. An annual jazz festival, the P.E.I. Jazz and Blues Festival. is a week-long series of concerts taking place at several venues including Murphy's Community Centre, outdoor stages, and churches in Charlottetown. The moving of its date to mid-August caused in 2011 a serious loss in funding from Ottawa's regional development agency ACOA. The musician's line up in 2011 included Oliver Jones, Sophie Milman, Matt Dusk, Jack de Keyzer, Jack Semple, Meaghan Smith and Jimmy Bowskill. There is also Canada Rocks, and the Cavendish Beach Music Festival. With agriculture and fishery playing a large role in the economy, P.E.I. has been marketed as a food tourism destination.

=== Sports ===
The province is home to a major junior ice hockey team, the Charlottetown Islanders of the Quebec Maritimes Junior Hockey League, and a Junior A ice hockey team, the Summerside Western Capitals, which play in the Maritime Junior A Hockey League. The Prince Edward Island Senators played in the American Hockey League from 1993 to 1996. Relocated from New Haven, Connecticut, the team was affiliated with the Ottawa Senators. The team eventually ended up in Binghamton, New York and became the Binghamton Senators in 2002. The Island Storm were a professional basketball team that played in the National Basketball League of Canada. The team was founded in 2011 as the Summerside Storm for the league's inaugural season and became the Island Storm in 2013. The team was granted a one-year leave of absence in 2021 but have not returned since. Prince Edward Island has hosted three Canada Games: two winter editions in 1991 and 2023; and a summer edition in 2009. The UPEI Panthers represent the University of Prince Edward Island in the Atlantic University Sport conference of U Sports. The Holland Hurricanes represent Holland College in the Atlantic Collegiate Athletic Association conference of the Canadian Collegiate Athletic Association. The island was a part of the IIGA, the association that organises the biannual Island Games. During their time participating in the multi sport competition, they won 6 gold medals, 6 silver medals and 9 bronze medals, totalling to 21 medals awarded during the 9 times they competed. The island resigned from the IIGA in 2011.

== See also ==
- Outline of Prince Edward Island
- List of people from Prince Edward Island
