= James Milligan (singer) =

Canadian singer

James Milligan (5 April 1928 – 28 November 1961, Basel) was a Canadian singer who appeared in concerts and operas from the early 1950s until his death in 1961 at the age of 33. In the year of his death he achieved a major triumph at the Bayreuth Festival as Wotan, a.k.a. "The Wanderer", in Richard Wagner's Siegfried for which he achieved international fame. In 1957 he won first prize at the Geneva International Music Competition. His voice type has been variously labeled as either a baritone, dramatic baritone, bass-baritone, and a bass. Standing at nearly 6 foot 6 inches and possessing a trim athletic build, Milligan was visually striking on stage. This aspect in combination with a charismatic stage personality captivated audiences at theaters in Canada and Europe. His voice is preserved on several recordings made with the English conductor Malcolm Sargent for the EMI record label, and on several recordings made with the Toronto Symphony Orchestra and Toronto Mendelssohn Choir.

== Early life and education ==
Born in Halifax, Nova Scotia, James Milligan spent his childhood in Winnipeg, Manitoba where his father was a minister in the United Church of Canada. As a teenager, he moved with his family to Huntsville, Ontario when his father took a new post as a minister in a church in that town. There he met the pianist Edith Scott whom he later married in 1951. In his youth he developed a passion for long-distance running; an activity which some later credited for helping develop his unusually good breath control as a singer. He began his musical development singing at church while growing up, and initially was interested in following his father's path into a career as a minister.

Milligan entered The Royal Conservatory of Music in 1948 where he studied singing with Emmy Heim and Leslie Holmes for the next seven years. He also studied with baritone Robert Weede in New York City, and later with Roy Henderson in London. He won several singing competitions during the 1950s, including the Nos futures étoiles in 1951, the Singing Stars of Tomorrow radio competition in 1954, and most significantly the Geneva International Music Competition in 1957.

== Career ==
Milligan's first public concerts were given in a series of recitals sponsored by the Ontario Department of Education in 1949. On March 21, 1951, he made his first significant appearance as an oratorio singer as the bass soloist in Johann Sebastian Bach's St Matthew Passion with the Toronto Symphony Orchestra (TSO), the Toronto Mendelssohn Choir (TMC), tenor William Morton, soprano Lois Marshall, contralto Margaret Stilwell, and harpsichordist Greta Kraus; a performance recorded live for broadcast on CBC Radio. He later recorded the work for a LP record with the same orchestra and choir in 1953, and that same year performed the title role in Felix Mendelssohn's Elijah. In 1952 he was the baritone soloist for a radio broadcast of Godfrey Ridout's Esther with the CBC Symphony Orchestra under conductor Ettore Mazzoleni. In 1954 he appeared at Carnegie Hall as the bass soloist in performances of both the St Matthew Passion and George Frideric Handel's Messiah. He recorded the latter work in 1952 for Beaver Records; also with the TSO and TMC.

Milligan made his professional opera debut in 1951 with Herman Geiger-Torel's Opera Festival Company of Toronto (now the Canadian Opera Company) where he initially appeared in smaller supporting roles for the next several seasons. By 1954 he had progressed to larger parts with the company; and that year he was heard as Marcello in La bohème, Monterone in Rigoletto, and Cancian in I quatro rusteghi. In 1955 he performed the part of Germont in La Traviata with the company, and he returned once more in 1959 to portray Don Carlo in La Forza del Destino. In 1958 he portrayed Scarpia in television film version of Giacomo Puccini's opera Tosca made for CBC Television.

Milligan made a number of recordings with Sir Malcolm Sargent, including Handel's Messiah and William Walton's Belshazzar's Feast

In 1956 Milligan made his European debut at the Glyndebourne Festival Opera as Arbace in Wolfgang Amadeus Mozart's Idomeneo. In 1959 he made his debut at the Royal Opera House, Covent Garden as Escamillo in Georges Bizet's Carmen. After this he became a resident artist at Theater Basel. In 1961, just four months prior to his death, he gave a critically lauded performance at the Bayreuth Festival as Wotan disguised as The Wanderer in Richard Wagner's Siegfried which brought him international recognition as a top Wagnerian singer. As a result of this success, he was signed to a continuing contract with the Bayreuth Festival.

== Death ==
James Milligan died at the age of 33 in Basel Switzerland from a heart attack during a rehearsal for an opera being staged by Theater Basel on November 28, 1961. The English conductor Malcolm Sargent in coordination with the Musicians Benevolent Fund organized the collection of funds to financially support Milligan's wife and young son following his death.
