= Ruth Watson Henderson =

Canadian composer and pianist (1932–2026)

- Born: Ruth Louise Watson; 23 November 1932; Toronto, Ontario, Canada
- Died: 9 June 2026 (aged 93)
- Education: The Royal Conservatory of Music, Mannes College of Music
- Occupations: Accompanist, music director
- Years active: 1952–2026
- Era: Contemporary
- Known for: Choral music

Ruth Louise Watson Henderson (23 November 1932 – 9 June 2026) was a Canadian composer and pianist, best known for her choral music. She was the accompanist for the Festival Singers of Canada under Elmer Iseler for many years, where she developed her ear for composing mixed-choral works. Henderson also accompanied the Toronto Children's Chorus under Jean Ashworth Bartle from its inception in 1978 to 2007 and was music director for Kingsway-Lambton United Church in Toronto from 1996 to 2013.

An associate of the Canadian Music Centre, Watson Henderson's compositional output includes works for organ, piano, violin, trumpet, string orchestra, and more than 200 choral pieces. Her works are known for their use of modal and impressionistic harmonies. In 1989 her Chromatic Partita for Organ won a prize in an International Competition for Women Composers in Mannheim, Germany. In 1992 her Voices of Earth won the National Choral Award for Outstanding Choral Composition. In 1996 she received the Distinguished Service Award of the Ontario Choral Federation. Many of her works have been recorded and enjoy international popularity. Additionally, Canadian choirs often perform entire concerts of her compositions.

== Life and career ==
Born Ruth Louise Watson in Toronto, Watson Henderson studied the piano with Viggo Kihl from 1937 to 1945. She then entered The Royal Conservatory of Music where she studied from 1945 to 1952 and earned an associate's diploma (ARCT) in 1949 and a licentiate diploma (LRCT) in 1951. Her piano teacher there was Alberto Guerrero. She also studied composition privately with Oskar Morawetz, Samuel Dolin and Richard Johnston. From 1952 to 1954 she studied piano at the Mannes College of Music in New York City with Hans Neumann.

Watson Henderson made her professional concert debut in 1952 in Toronto and quickly became active as a solo concert pianist with symphony orchestras throughout Canada. She also played with some frequency on CBC Radio. In 1956 she won the grand prize on the CBC radio talent show Opportunity Knocks. After this, she moved to Manitoba where she lived in Winnipeg until 1961. After a few years in Kitchener, she returned to Toronto where she still resided.

While she was the accompanist for the Festival Singers of Canada she began to compose choral music, including her 'Missa Brevis.' Later large works influenced by her experience in working with fine choirs include 'Voices of Earth' and 'From Darkness to Light.' When she was the accompanist for the Toronto Children's Chorus, she wrote many compositions for children's voices, including Clear Sky and Thunder, a music-drama about Inuit children, which the TCC premiered in 1984 and 'The Last Straw' which featured tenor Ben Heppner in 1990.

In 2003, she was made an honorary Fellow (FRCCO) of the Royal Canadian College of Organists.

In celebration of her 70th birthday, a special concert of Henderson’s work was performed by the Elmer Iseler Singers, recorded and released by the CBC in 2004 as the album ‘’Sing We Joyful’’.

Watson Henderson died on 9 June 2026, at the age of 93.
