= Gordon Wry =

Canadian opera singer

Gordon Wry (1910–1985) was a Canadian tenor and conductor. His voice is preserved on a handful of recordings made with pianist Glenn Gould.

Born in Saint John, New Brunswick, Wry studied singing with renowned contralto Nellie Smith and music theory with Healey Willan at the Toronto Conservatory of Music. He was one of the original members of the Festival Singers of Canada and was instrumental in encouraging Elmer Iseler to form that choir. He performed with that ensemble during the 1950s, 1960s and 1970s. He also worked as G. Ricordi & Co.'s Canadian agent during the 1950s.

Wry performed with the Canadian Opera Company during its early years and was a leading tenor with the CBC Opera Company from 1949–1953. He notably portrayed the role of Bob Boles in the Canadian premiere of Benjamin Britten's Peter Grimes for the opening of the CBC Opera Company's second season with William Morton in the title role, Edmund Hockridge as Captain Balstrode, Frances James as Ellen Orford, and Eric Tredwell as Swallow. The production was awarded the Best Music Program prize at the 1950 Canadian Radio Awards Competition. In 1954 he portrayed the title role in the world premiere of Frederick Jacobi's The Prodigal Son at the Forest Hill Collegiate Auditorium in Toronto.

Wry taught for many years on the faculty of Massey College at the University of Toronto where he founded and conducted the Massey College Singers.
