= Gilles Lamontagne (baritone) =

Gilles Lamontagne (21 March 1924, Montreal – 28 December 1993, Quebec) was a Canadian baritone who had an active international career in operas and concerts from the 1940s through the 1960s. He was trained at The Royal Conservatory of Music where he was a pupil of Herman Geiger-Torel, and also studied with Isa Jeynevald in Quebec City, Mario Rubini–Reichlin in New York City, and Mario Basiola in Milan. In the late 1940s he won two national singing competitions in Canada on CBC Radio, Singing Stars of Tomorrow and Nos futures étoiles. He sang leading roles in opera houses in Canada, Europe, and North Africa during the 1950s and 1960s. His repertoire included Albert in Jules Massenet's Werther, Lescaut in Massenet's Manon, Sharpless in Giacomo Puccini's Madama Butterfly, both Valentin and Méphistophélès in Charles Gounod's Faust, Zurga in Georges Bizet's Les pêcheurs de perles, and the title role in Giuseppe Verdi's Rigoletto among other parts.
