= Donald Patriquin =

Canadian composer, organist and choral conductor

Donald Patriquin (born October 21, 1938, in Sherbrooke, Quebec) is a Canadian composer, organist, and choral conductor. Known internationally for choral and instrumental arrangements of folk music, Patriquin was a member of the Faculty of Music of McGill University from 1965 to 1996. He currently resides in the Eastern Townships of Quebec.

== Musical background ==
Patriquin began composing at the age of 11, winning several awards through his youth while studying composition with Jean Papineau-Couture during summer sessions. He completed a biology degree at Bishop's University in 1959 before beginning his formal studies in music. He studied composition at McGill University with István Anhalt and at the University of Toronto with John Weinzwig, earning a Bachelor of Music degree from McGill in 1964 and an M.A. from Toronto in 1970. He also holds an A.Mus. degree in organ performance from McGill and an RCCO

== Music ==
Patriquin's compositions are best known for the use of folk music elements, and in his instrumental work for abstract noises imitating sounds of nature. This compositional style can be seen in such pieces as the Fantasy for Fiddle and the Hangman's Reel/Suite Carignan. Some of Patriquin's works include visual or other multimedia elements. Trois mois, composed in 1982, includes a diaporama, and Earthpeace II, a 1998 composition commemorating the victims of Chernobyl, is written for dancers and choir.

His music is published by Earthsongs, A Tempo, and Canadian International Music.

== Discography ==
- En la Fête de Noël - O Holy Night. Various artists, 1999. Naxos
- Songs of Light. Jean Ashworth Bartle conductor, Ruth Watson Henderson piano, Toronto Children's Chorus. Marquis Classics, 253 (CD)

== Works ==
=== Choral - a capella ===
- Take, O Take Those Lips Away. 1962
- The Greenwood Tree. 1963
- A Lover and His Lass. 1965
- Black is the Colour of My True Love's Hair, arr. 1968
- Sortilege. 1979
- Magnificat. 1983
- Il est né le divin enfant, arr. 1989
- Sixtyfold Amen. 1989
- An Old Gaelic Blessing. 1990
- Antiphon and the Child of Mary. 1992

=== Choral - with accompaniment ===
- A Child's Carol. 1952 rev. 1992
- Six Songs of Early Canada, arr. 1980 rev. 1992
- Listen Sweet Dove. 1981
- Six Noëls Anciens, arr. 1982
- Songs of Innocence. 1984
- Carol of the Fieldmice. 1985, rev. 1992
- Chantons Noël. 1985 rev. 1992
- Earthpeace Two. 1988
- All Through the Night. arr. 1989
- Introit. 1990
- Prayer of Saint Francis. 1990
- Requiem at Sea (The Titanic). 1992
- 'A Soalin', arr. 1992
- On Christmas Day, arr. 1992
- J'entends le Moulin, arr. 1992
- Sister Mary Had One Child, arr. 1992
- Un Canadien errant, arr. 1993
- Overture to Christmas. 1993
- The Five Seasons. 1997
- World Music Suite. 1997
- Mass for the Caribbean. 1998
- Canadian Mosaic. 2000
- Psalms & Canticles of Praise and Peace. 2003
- Three love songs from the British Isles. 2007

=== Instrumental/Other ===
- Fantasy for Fiddle. 1975
- Hangman's Reel/Suite Carignan. 1978
- Blanche de Percé (for narrator, guitar, flute and percussion). 1982
- Trois mois. 1982
- Cycles (for soprano, piano and clarinet). 2004
- Louisa's Story (musical with libretto by Sunil Mahtani). 2005
