= Elmer Iseler Singers =

Choir

- Choir
- Founded: 1979 (47 years ago)
- Website: www.elmeriselersingers.com

The Elmer Iseler Singers is a professional chamber choir based in Toronto, Ontario, Canada.

The twenty-voice choir, conducted by Artistic Director Lydia Adams, founded by Dr. Elmer Iseler in 1979, is one of Canada's leading choral ensembles. The choir has built an international reputation through its concerts, broadcasts and more than fifty recordings. The Elmer Iseler Singers' repertoire spans five hundred years of choral music. The choir regularly commissions and performs new works, and appears at national and international festivals.

The Singers are highly valued for their contributions to master classes and educational leadership workshops for schools and community choirs. From 1997 to 2007, the EIS was the professional Choir-In-Residence through the Elmer Iseler Chair, at the University of Toronto's Faculty of Music. They often collaborate with Soundstreams Canada, the Canadian Brass, Nexus, Ontario Music Festivals, and the Toronto Symphony, as well as various local, national, and international organizations.

== Discography ==
- Corona Divinae Misericordiae, by David Braid - K52 Music (2018 - Juno-nominated)
- Piano concerto; Oboe concerto; Serenade to music; Flos campi, Vaughan Williams - Chandos (2018)
- Dark Star Requiem, by Peter Staniland - Centrediscs (2016)
- Lamentations of Jeremiah, by Peter Togni - ECM (2009)
- The Tokaido, The Choral Music of Harry Freedman - Centrediscs (2006)
- People of Faith, Canadian Brass feat. Elmer Iseler Singers - Opening Day (2005)
- Sing all ye joyful, Music of Ruth Watson Henderson - CBC (2004)
- Puer natus in Bethlehem, alleluia! Christmas carols by Canadian composers - CBC (2003)
- Credo - Decca (2002)
- Joyous Light, with Isabel Bayrakdarian - CBC (2002)
- The Glorious Sounds of Somers, the choral music of Harry Somers - Centrediscs (2001)
- Elmer Iseler conducts Canadian Music - Centrediscs (1999)
- The Maple Leaf Forever A Canadian Panorama - Opening Day (1998)
- Noël : early Canadian Christmas Music, with Michael Schade, Norine Burgess, Mireille Lagacé - Marquis Classics (1998)
- Sacred & Profane Somers : choral works of Harry Somers - Centrediscs (1995)
- Ragtime! with the Canadian Brass - RCA (1995)
- The Glory of Palestrina: 1594-1994 - CBC (1994)
- Gloria : sacred choral works - CBC (1993)
- Glick, Holman, Somers, Coulthard - CBC (1992)
- The Christmas Album, with the Canadian Brass - Decca (1990)
- Spirituals - Marquis (1986)
- Welcome Yule! - CBC (1986)
- Bach-300-Handel : a celebration of genius - CBC (1985)
- Jesu, joy of man's desiring and other great Bach choruses - CBC (1985)
- Première - Centrediscs, 2-disc set (1984)
- Serenade in Harmony, with The Netherlands Chamber Choir - Waterloo (1984)
- Musical Toronto: a concert party, by John Beckwith - Marquis (1984)
- Chalumeau, by Harry Freedman - Centrediscs (1983)
- Music at Sharon: A Celebration of 150 Years, 1831-1981 - Melbourne (1982)
- Spectra: the Elmer Iseler Singers - Centrediscs (1981)
