= Louise Roy (soprano) =

Louise Roy (25 May 1924, Saint Boniface, Winnipeg – 27 July 1985, Toronto) was a Canadian dramatic soprano who was a resident artist with the Canadian Opera Company and the CBC Opera Company during the mid 20th century. Educated at The Royal Conservatory of Music, she notably won both the Singing Stars of Tomorrow and Nos futures étoiles singing competitions.
