= Arlene Nimmons Pach =

- Born: Arlene Alnora Nimmons; May 26, 1928; Kamloops
- Died: March 2, 2000 (aged 71) Fredericton
- Genres: Classical
- Instrument: Piano
- Spouse: Joseph Pach

Arlene Nimmons Pach (née Arlene Alnora Nimmons; 26 May 1928 – 2 March 2000) was a Canadian pianist. She and her husband the violinist Joseph Pach performed together as the Duo Pach. They were musicians in residence at the University of New Brunswick in Fredericton from 1964 until 1993.

Arlene Nimmons was born in Kamloops in 1928. She was a piano student of Boris Roubakine at the Toronto Conservatory of Music, where she earned an Associate Diploma in 1945. She made her professional debut in 1947 with the Vancouver Junior Symphony. In 1960 she and her husband Joseph Pach, whom she had married in 1954, formed the Duo Pach. After a six month residence in London funded by a Canada Council fellowship, during which they made their debut at the Wigmore Hall, the Duo toured Canada. In 1964 the president of the University of New Brunswick (UNB), Colin B. Mackay, invited them to be musicians in residence at the university. Arlene Pach continued to perform as a soloist and chamber musician, as well as with Duo Pach.

In 1966 the Pachs initiated an annual Chamber Music and All That Jazz Festival at UNB. Arlene Pach was the festival's artistic director until it ceased in 1983. Her brother, clarinetist Phil Nimmons, introduced the jazz component to the festival in 1969, and acted as director of jazz studies at UNB until 1982.

After her death in 2000 the Arlene Nimmons Pach endowment fund was set up to fund a scholarship at the Royal Conservatory of Music.
