= Emmy Heim =

Austrian soprano and voice teacher (1885–1954)

- Born: Emilie Heim; 10 September 1885; Vienna, Austria-Hungary
- Died: 13 October 1954 (aged 69); Toronto, Ontario, Canada
- Occupations: Soprano; voice teacher
- Years active: 1911
- Employer: The Royal Conservatory of Music
- Style: Classical
- Spouse: Emil Alphons Rheinhardt (m. 1915; div. 1917) Franz Singer (m. 1921, separated)

Emmy Heim (born Emilie Heim; 10 September 1885 – 13 October 1954) was an Austrian soprano singer and voice teacher. In her later career, she lived in England and Canada.

== Early life and career ==
Heim was born in Vienna in 1885. She studied singing there with her mother and with Frances Mütter. She made her debut in 1911 at the Bösendorfer-Saal and became well known as a concert singer in Austria, appearing many times at the Konzerthaus, Vienna, and touring Germany, France and Switzerland.

She performed songs by Franz Schubert and Robert Schumann, and also sang contemporary works by Arnold Schoenberg, Alban Berg and others. In 1915, she gave the first performance of Schoenberg's songs "Waldsonne" (from Vier Lieder, Op. 2, No. 4) and "Verlassen" (from Acht Lieder, Op. 6, No. 4). She sang in large orchestral works and took part in Schoenberg's Society for Private Musical Performances in 1919.

In 1915, Heim married the writer Emil Alphons Rheinhardt; through him she met well-known writers, including Rainer Maria Rilke and Hugo von Hofmannsthal. In 1916, Oskar Kokoschka made a lithograph of her.

In 1921, she married the architect Franz Singer. They separated after a few years of marriage. They had a son, Michael, and two further children died in childhood.

== In England and Canada and death ==
Heim made her debut in England in 1929 and moved to London in the early 1930s. She occasionally returned to Vienna to give recitals; she also maintained a singing studio in Salzburg, where she taught during summers.

In 1934, while visiting her brother in Canada, she met Sir Ernest MacMillan, which led to an informal concert and a subsequent concert debut at Hart House Theatre in Toronto later that year. She then spent a few months each year in Canada until 1939, teaching and giving recitals.

During the World War II she lived in England. She sang at Red Cross hospitals and in military camps and gave concert recitals in London, as well as being a guest lecturer at the Oxford and Cambridge Universities. After the war, she moved to Canada and taught at The Royal Conservatory of Music in Toronto. Her pupils included Frances James, Jan Simons and Lois Marshall. Heim died in Toronto in 1954.

Heim died in Toronto in 1954.
