= Marthe Létourneau =

- Born: June 27, 1916; Quebec City, Quebec, Canada
- Died: December 7, 1998 (aged 82); Outremont, Quebec, Canada
- Occupations: Soprano; Teacher
- Years active: 1937–1974

Marthe Létourneau (June 27, 1916 – December 7, 1998) was a Canadian soprano and teacher. She appeared as soloist with the Montreal Symphony Orchestra the Orchestre Symphonique de Québec, the Canadian Operetta Society in Montreal, the Opéra national du Québec and for Les Variétés lyriques. Létourneau sung on the radio stations CKAC and CKVL and on the CBC and gave recitals in every Canadian province. She was the winner of the CBC Montreal national talent contest program Opportunity Knocks in 1949. Létourneau toured with the Jeunesses Musicales Canada (JMC).

== Biography ==
Létourneau was born in Quebec City, Quebec on June 27, 1916. She was the daughter of the organist Antonio Létourneau and her sister was called Madeleine Létourneau. Létourneau received lessons in diction, piano and phonetics before she went on to study singing from 1934 to 1944, firstly with her mother, then with Salvator Issaurel and finally with Pauline Donalda. She was a soprano, and appeared as soloist with the Montreal Symphony Orchestra the Orchestre Symphonique de Québec, and the Canadian Operetta Society in Montreal.

In 1937, Létourneau made her debut in a production of Louis Varney's Les mousquetaires au couvent at the Monument-National in 1937. In 1938, she won the silver medal offered by Esioff-Léon Patenaude, the Lieutenant Governor of Quebec, for the best vocal performance with the “highest distinction.” at the Quebec Music Festival. Létourneau gave a recital at the Prince of Wales Salon of the Windsor Hotel in Montreal in February 1941, and made her stage debut when she performed in Charles Gounod's Mirielle at the Church of the Gesù that October. From 1940 to 1950, she sung on the radio stations CKAC and CKVL and on the CBC and gave recitals in all other Canadian provinces. Létourneau had several roles for the Opéra national du Québec and for Les Variétés lyriques. She was Antonia in the Variétés lyriques production of The Tales of Hoffmann in 1942. In that year, Létourneau created Josette in the premiere of Eugène Lapierre's comic opera Le Père des amours. She also had roles in The Great Waltz alongside The Varieties and at the Palais Montcalm, Quebec in the main roles of Gaetano Donizetti's La fille du régiment and Jacques Offenbach's La fille du tambour-major.

Between 1940 and 1942, Létourneau taught voice at Mont Notre-Dame in Sherbrooke. In November 1943, she gave farewell recital in the academic hall of Mont Notre-Dame, and then duetted with the baritone Maurice Laurin at the Hermitage. Létourneau gave a recital at the Le Plateau-Mont-Royal, Montreal in January 1945, and at Parc Saint-Marc in July 1946. She was part of a musical tea party will be presented by the Midinettes women's choir at the Royal Hotel, Shawinigan in early 1947, and made her debut at the Opera Guild (His Majesty's Theatre, Montreal) as Gilda in Rigoletto in January 1948. In May 1948, Létourneau performed at Plateau Hall, Montreal and included the maiden public performance of William Shakespeare's Sigh No More, Ladies. That November, she had a concert tour in Montreal, Jonquière, La Baie, Arvida, Dolbeau and St-Joseph d'Alma alongside Colombe Pelletier. Létourneau was a guest performer at the L'Union Musicale de Grand’Mère in April 1949.

She was voted the winner of the CBC Montreal national talent contest program Opportunity Knocks by Canadian radio listeners in June 1949 and was awarded a 13-week assignment as a guest soloist on the CBC Dominion Network series Opportunity Winner. From 1949 to 1950, Létourneau, the pianist Gilles Breton and the violinist Noël Brunet made the first of three organized tours by the newly established Jeunesses Musicales Canada (JMC). The venues they played at were the Albani Club, the St. Jean-Baptiste Hall, and School Immaculate Conception, Shawinigan. She left for Europe in May 1950, as a soloist with the Disciples de Massenet and, on a grant from the Government of Quebec, resided in France and Italy. While in Paris, Létourneau worked with Pierre Bernac and with Luigi Ricci and Ré Koster in Rome. She did radio recitals in France and participated in concerts conducted by Nadia Boulanger.

When she returned to Canada, she toured with the JMC for the second time between 1952 and 1953 and regularly appeared on the CBC Television programs L'Heure du concert and Concerts pour la jeunesse. Létourneau travelled from New York to Île-de-France and spent the following 18 months in France and Italy. In November 1956, she gave a recital at Le Plateau, before completing her training at the Conservatoire de musique du Québec with Bernard Diamant, Dick Marzollo and Otto-Werner Mueller between 1957 and 1958, opening the JMC's concert season in July 1957. During the 1960–1961 season, following a JM tour of 50 concerts in France as a member of a vocal quartet, Létourneau toured for the JMC in Maurice Blackburn's Silent Measures. She did a two-hour show at the Cascade Inn, Shawinigan in October 1962.

From 1960 to 1962, Létourneau taught voice at the École de musique Vincent-d'Indy, at the Institut Nazareth and the Grey Nuns' School, Hull from 1960 to 1966 and at the Institut pédagogique de Montréal between 1962 and 1963. From 1966 to 1984, she also taught at Université Laval and was a member of one of its vocal quartet between 1972 and 1974.

== Personal life ==
Létourneau was unmarried. She died of a heart condition on December 7, 1998, in Outremont, Quebec. Létourneau's funeral took place at Sainte-Madeleine d'Outremont on the morning of December 12, 1998.
