= Opportunity Knocks (Canadian radio show) =

Radio program

Opportunity Knocks was a talent competition show that aired on CBC Radio from 1947 until 1957. It was created and directed by John Adaskin. The show featured a variety of performers hoping to break into the entertainment industry, including singers, instrumentalists, composers, announcers, and actors.

Notable performers brought to notice by the show include Lois Marshall, Jon Vickers, Maureen Forrester, and Robert Goulet.

== Format ==
The show was broken into three series per season, each running around 10 weeks. Weekly winners were chosen initially by studio audience response and mail-in voting, and later by a panel of judges. Those winners would compete at the end of the series for three Grand Awards, which came with contracts to appear in the 13-week summer series Opportunity Winners. Runners up received cash prizes.

Auditions were usually held in the CBC Toronto studios, though Adaskin would also occasionally travel the country to hold out-of-town tryouts.

== Winners ==
=== Grand Award ===
One Grand Award winner was chosen per series, hence there were typically three awarded per year. The winners were:

- 1947: Bernard Johnson (baritone), Wilfred Reed (tenor)
- 1948: Billy Meek (pop singer), Gratien Landry (tenor), Doreen Hume (soprano), Les Neal (pop singer)
- 1949: Betty McCaskill (soprano), Marthe Létourneau (soprano), Kalle Ruusunen (baritone)
- 1950: Marie-Germaine Leblanc (soprano), Charles Rush (baritone), Joseph F. Rainer (tenor)
- 1951: Fernand Martel (baritone), Morris Kronick (piano), William Blaine Williams (baritone)
- 1952: Angela Antonelli (soprano), Sylvia Grant (soprano), Marguerite Lavergne (soprano)
- 1953: Roma Butler (soprano), David Brewster (piano), Paul Norrback (accordion)
- 1954: Lesia Zubrack (soprano), Janine Gingras (pop singer), Anne McCahey (piano)
- 1955: François Auffray (pop singer), Jeannette Franklin (pop singer), Gordie Fleming (accordion)
- 1956: Ruth Watson Henderson (piano)

=== Composers ===
Separate awards for composers were given starting in 1950, replacing the announcers category. The following composers won first prizes or honorable mentions:

- Murray Adaskin (1953)
- Maurice Blackburn (1951)
- Alexander Brott (1954)
- Johnny Burt (1951, 1953)
- Harry Freedman (1951)
- Hector Gratton (1952)
- Calvin Jackson (1952)
- Sandy Jones (1954)
- Walter Kaufmann (1950, 1951, 1953)
- Neil McKay (1954)
- Art Morrow (1951)
- Jean Papineau-Couture (1952)
- Godfrey Ridout (1951)
- John Weinzweig (1950)
- Healey Willan (1952)

== Other notable contestants ==
The following individuals competed on Opportunity Knocks and did not win, but went on to significant performing careers:

- Donald Bell
- Norman Brooks
- Corinne Conley
- Maureen Forrester
- Robert Goulet
- Lois Marshall
- Howard Mawson
- David Mills
- Sylvia Murphy
- Joseph Pach
- Louis Quilico
- Joseph Rouleau
- Irene Salemka
- Steven Staryk
