= Doreen Hume =

Canadian soprano soloist (1926–2022)

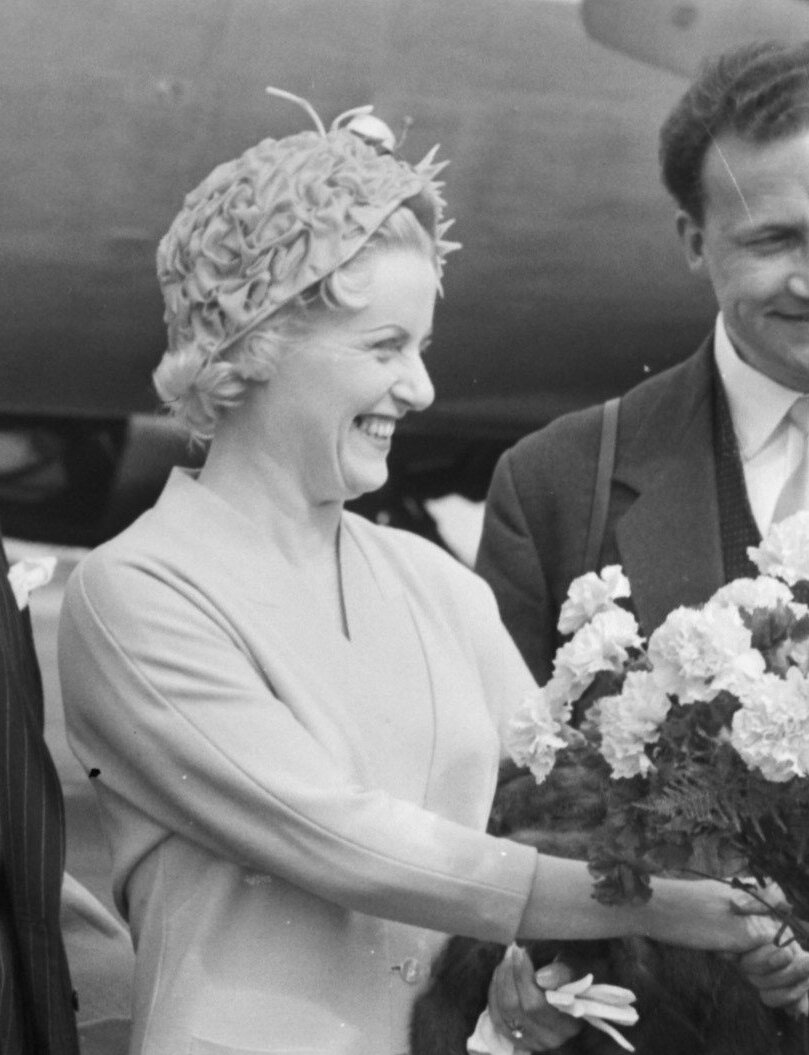
Doreen Hume

Doreen Hume (born Edith Doreen Hulme; July 14, 1926 – July 2, 2022) was a Canadian soprano soloist who performed in North America and Europe from the 1940s through to the 1970s.

== Biography ==
Born Edith Doreen Hulme in Sault Ste. Marie, Ontario, she was a student of John Blackburn in the Sault from 1945 to 1953 and with George Lambert at the Royal Conservatory of Music in Toronto. She was soloist from 1946 to 1953 at Grace Church on-the-Hill in Toronto.

She began a long association with the CBC after winning an Opportunity Knocks award in 1948. At that time she sang in a 13-week series with the network and also sang in Gilbert and Sullivan's comic operas with the CBC Light Opera Company. She was cast in CBC's North American radio premiere of Peter Grimes on October 12, 1949 and also in the repeat broadcast in 1952.

As a concert soloist she appeared with the Toronto Symphony Orchestra in various pops concerts between 1949 and 1959 and with the Toronto Mendelssohn Choir in their 1950 performance of Beethoven's Missa solemnis. She was also a soloist in Halifax and Ottawa performances of The Creation during this period.

In 1954 Hume moved to England, where she served from 1955 to 1970 as principal soprano soloist of the BBC Light Music department, giving over 1800 radio and TV performances under the direction of Robert Farnon, Sidney Torch, Carmen Dragon, and others. She was the soprano soloist in a November 16, 1957 London performances of Fauré's Requiem and on January 4, 1958 she was a soloist in a performance of Handel's Messiah with Maureen Forrester and Jon Vickers. Both performances were conducted by Sir Malcolm Sargent.

In 1956, Hume had four duet records with fellow Canadian John Hanson released by the budget Embassy label. On these, they performed medleys from Oklahoma, Carousel, The King and I and Guys and Dolls.

She represented England at the Venice Festival of Light Music in 1957, toured in Europe in 1958 with the BBC Concert Orchestra, and represented Canada at a special liberation anniversary concert in May 1965 in the Netherlands.

Hume recorded 10 albums of light music and musical comedy, beginning in 1958, for the Philips Fontana, Epic and Rondolette labels. Her show tune recordings are listed in Jack Raymond's Show Music on Record (New York 1982). She also sang the role of Kate in a recording of Gilbert and Sullivan's The Yeomen of the Guard (1958, 2-HMV ALP-1601-2/EMI EX-749594/EMI CDS7 47718-8).

In 1970 she returned to Toronto where she lived and worked for the next 20 years. In 1990 she returned to Sault Ste. Marie, Ontario, where she was appointed to the faculty of Algoma University College and also became a voice teacher at the Algoma Conservatory of Music.

In 2009, Hume was selected for induction into the Sault Ste. Marie Walk of Fame.

Hume died in Sault Ste. Marie, Ontario on July 2, 2022, at the age of 95. Her husband, Thomas Purnell Mulhinch, predeceased her. She was survived by her daughter.
