= CKVL =

CKVL may represent:

- CKVL-FM 100.1, a radio station in LaSalle, Quebec, Canada
- CINF 690 AM, a defunct radio station in Montreal, Quebec, Canada that used to broadcast on 850 AM as "CKVL"
- CKOI-FM 96.9, a radio station in Montreal, Quebec, Canada that used to broadcast as "CKVL-FM"
