= Jan Simons =

Canadian opera singer

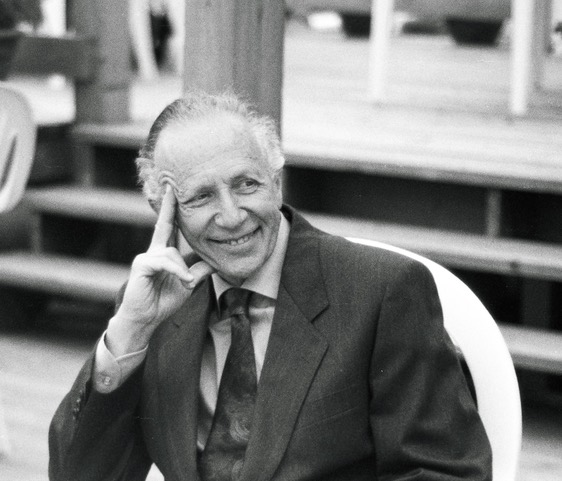
- Born: 11 November 1925; Düsseldorf, Germany
- Died: 7 May 2006 (aged 80)
- Citizenship: Canadian
- Occupations: Baritone, music teacher, administrator

Jan Simons (11 November 1925 – 7 May 2006) was a Canadian baritone, music teacher and administrator. Complementing a vocal performance career in Canada in the 1950s and 1960s, he was a member of the faculty of music at McGill University in Montreal and a long-time teacher and general director at the summer music camp of Canadian Amateur Musicians/Musiciens Amateurs du Canada (CAMMAC).

== Life and career ==
Born in Düsseldorf, Germany, he lived in The Hague, Netherlands, before moving with his family to Montreal in 1939. After graduating from high school, he studied voice in New York City with Emilio de Gogorza, then returned to Canada to attend The Royal Conservatory of Music in Toronto on a scholarship, where he studied with Emmy Heim and Ernesto Vinci.

Simons specialized in lieder as well as oratorio; notable performances include the 1956 Canadian premiere of the ballet Dark Elegies by the National Ballet of Canada, set to music of Mahler's Kindertotenlieder, and the Stratford Festival's first concert in 1955.

Simons taught voice in the Faculty of Music at McGill University from 1961 to 1993, continuing to teach song interpretation as well as vocal technique privately until his death. He also taught for periods of time at Montreal's Marianopolis College and Vanier College. Notable students who went on to vocal careers of their own include Stephanie Marshall and Matthew White. He received the Opus Prix Hommage from the Conseil québécois de la musique in 2005.

He is the father of six children, including Nicholas Simons, a Member of the Legislative Assembly of British Columbia.
