= Festival Singers of Canada =

Professional choir in Toronto (1954–1979)

The Festival Singers of Canada was a professional choir located in Toronto, Ontario, Canada from 1954–1979. Founded in 1954 by Elmer Iseler as the Festival Singers of Toronto, the choir was first heard on CBC Radio in a 1955 Good Friday broadcast of Bach's Christ lag in Todesbanden. Initially consisting of only 25 voices, the choir expanded to 32 voices and attracted international attention for their work in the early 1960s with Igor Stravinsky. Their recording of Symphony of Psalms, conducted by Stravinsky, was nominated in 1965 for a Grammy Award. Tenor Gordon Wry was one of the founding singers of the chorus.

The choir made its US debut in December 1967 at the White House. In 1968, the choir changed its name to the Festival Singers of Canada and became the first Canadian choir to develop professional status. At this time, the chorus became the core of the Toronto Mendelssohn Choir. Expanding to 36 voices, the ensemble toured Europe in 1971, and again in 1972 with the Toronto Mendelssohn Choir. Further US appearances included concerts at Lincoln Center (1972), the Kennedy Center (1976), and the Cathedral Basilica of Saints Peter and Paul in Philadelphia (1977). In 1977, the choir also toured England, West Germany, and the USSR. In Canada the ensemble toured the west in 1974 and 1977 and the east in 1975 and appeared at the Stratford Festival during the summers of 1955, 1956, 1958, 1963–1967 and 1974, the Guelph Spring Festival in 1968, 1973, and 1975–1977, the winter seasons of the Shaw Festival at Niagara-on-the-Lake, Ontario, from 1973 to 1976, and the 1976 Olympics in Montreal. Annual concert series were given in Toronto, and at the height of their fame the singers gave about 25 concerts each year on the CBC.

Excepting a period of about a year and a half (late 1960 to early 1962) when ill health forced his temporary resignation, Iseler was the Festival Singers' regular conductor until 1978. In Iseler's absence, Lloyd Bradshaw conducted several concerts, and Walter Susskind and Rowland Pack each conducted one. Iseler himself–as a guest–conducted the final concert in the 1961–1962 series prior to returning as artistic director in August 1962, and he retained the position for the ensuing 16 years. Ruth Watson Henderson served as the choir's accompanist from 1968–1979.

By the mid-1970s, there was dissatisfaction about the Festival Singers' objectives and policies among its constituent components–choir members, artistic director, management, and board. Furthermore, concern about the levels and sources of its funding prompted the Canada Council to commission a review of the choir's affairs in 1976. In 1978, these contentious issues resulted in the board announcement on 12 May that Iseler's contract would not be renewed.

Giles Bryant was named music director in June 1978, and Peter McCoppin, Jon Washburn, Brian Law, and John Barnum appeared as guest conductors during the 1978–1979 season. The season was not a financial success, due in part to decreased use of the choir by the CBC. The Festival Singers announced suspension of activities in April 1979 and filed an assignment of bankruptcy 30 Jul 1979.

== Sources ==
- The Canadian Encyclopedia
