= Stewart Goodyear =

Canadian pianist and composer

- Born: 1978 (age 47–48); Toronto, Ontario, Canada
- Occupations: Pianist; Composer
- Years active: 1988–present
- Website: www.stewartgoodyearpiano.com

Stewart Goodyear (born February 1978) is a Canadian concert pianist and composer. He is best known for performing all 32 Beethoven sonatas in a single day, a feat he has done at Koerner Hall (Toronto), McCarter Theatre (Princeton), the Mondavi Center (Davis, California), the AT&T Performing Arts Center (Dallas), and Memorial Hall (Cincinnati).

== Early life and education ==
Goodyear was born and raised in Toronto to a Trinidadian mother and British father. He never knew his father, who died from cancer a month before Stewart was born. But Goodyear grew up with his father's LPs, which included The Beatles, Led Zeppelin, Santana, and Beethoven and Tchaikovsky symphonies. He has said that hearing Beethoven is what compelled him to be a classical artist.

Goodyear was aware of the piano at age three and by four was playing by ear on a toy piano. After his family bought a full-size instrument, he took lessons and learned general music as a student at the school for the choirboys of St Michael's Cathedral in Toronto (St Michael's Choir School). Goodyear graduated from the Glenn Gould School at the Royal Conservatory of Music in Toronto at age 15. There he studied with James Anagnoson, who later became dean of the school. Goodyear attended the Curtis Institute of Music in Philadelphia where he studied with Leon Fleisher, Gary Graffman, and Claude Frank. He attended the Juilliard School in New York, where he studied with Oxana Yablonskaya and earned a master's in piano performance.

== Career ==
Goodyear has performed with the New York Philharmonic, Chicago Symphony, Pittsburgh Symphony, Philadelphia Orchestra, San Francisco Symphony, Los Angeles Philharmonic, Cleveland Orchestra, Academy of St. Martin in the Fields, Bournemouth Symphony, Frankfurt Radio Symphony, MDR Leipzig Radio Symphony Orchestra, Montreal Symphony, Toronto Symphony Orchestra, Dallas Symphony, Vancouver Symphony, Atlanta Symphony, Baltimore Symphony, Detroit Symphony, Orlando Philharmonic, Seattle Symphony, Mostly Mozart Festival Orchestra, Royal Liverpool Philharmonic and NHK Symphony Orchestra.

He is a contemporary classical musician who improvises cadenzas when performing Classical concertos. Goodyear typically meditates for half an hour before performing. Other preconcert rituals include reading a pocket-sized biography of Beethoven and reviewing the cover of the Beatles’ album With the Beatles before performing Gershwin. Goodyear has cited Leonard Bernstein as a particular influence, saying, "Bernstein is the classical musician of the 20th century I admire the most. He was inspired by all styles of music, and, just like Beethoven, he defied convention, created his own music, and communicated to audiences of all demographics."

In 2020, Goodyear performed on the PBS television program Now Hear This, where Scott Yoo hosted a one-hour segment on Mozart.

== Compositions ==
- Solo (A Suite for Solo Violin)
- Baby Shark Fugue
- Piano Quintet (Hommage a Beethoven)
- Callaloo Suite (for piano and orchestra)
- Cello Concerto
- Count Up (fanfare)
- Dogged by Hell Hounds
- Go Down Death
- Panorama
- Piano Quartet
- Sonata for Piano
- Variations on Eleanor Rigby
- Seasons
