= Nos futures étoiles =

Nos futures étoiles was a national music competition and radio program in Canada that was founded by CBC Montreal. It was broadcast annually on CBC Radio from 1947 through 1955. Created as a French-language counterpart to the English-language competition Singing Stars of Tomorrow, it was originally only a singing competition when it was established in 1947. Women and men competed in separate divisions in the singing competition, and a prize was awarded to one woman and one man each year. The competition initially awarded a prize of $500, but the prize award was later raised to $1000. In 1952 an instrumental music prize was added to competition categories. Contestants would perform live with an orchestra led by conductor Giuseppe Agostini. The competition ceased after the conclusion of the 1955 competition when it was replaced by another competition in 1956, the Concours de la chanson canadienne.

== Notable winners ==
- Gilles Lamontagne (1948)
- Louise Roy (1948)
- James Milligan (1951)
- Jon Vickers (1952)
- Louis Quilico (1953)
