= Joseph Pach =

- Born: January 8, 1928 (age 98); Toronto, Ontario
- Genres: Classical
- Instrument: Violin
- Formerly of: Duo Pach; Brunswick String Quartet
- Spouse: Arlene Nimmons Pach

Joseph Pach (born January 8, 1928, in Toronto, Ontario) is a Canadian violinist.

== Life and career ==
Pach studied the violin with Christoff Dafeff at the Toronto Conservatory of Music from 1933 to 1945, and with Kathleen Parlow at the University of Toronto.

In 1947, at the age of 19, Pach made his symphonic debut playing the Tchaikovsky Violin Concerto (Op 35 in D-Major) with the Toronto Symphony Orchestra. He has since played and toured with many orchestras including the National Arts Centre Orchestra, the Halifax Symphony Orchestra, CBC Orchestra, BBC Concert Orchestra, Royal Conservatory Symphony Orchestra, and others.

In 1952, Pach was slated to be accompanied by Mario Bernardi for a CBC broadcast. At the last minute Bernardi couldn't make it and the producer asked Pach if he'd mind if a young woman filled in for Bernardi. Pach conceded. In 1954, he married that pianist Arlene Nimmons, sister of Phil Nimmons, and they began performing as The Duo Pach in 1960. They spent the next few years touring England, Germany, and Canada. It was during their 1964 Canadian tour that the University of New Brunswick invited them to be Resident Musicians. The couple accepted and moved to Fredericton, New Brunswick, where they worked and presented free Friday noon hour concerts for the next 6 years performing just about all the Violin and Piano repertoire.

Pach graduated from the University of Toronto with an Artist Diploma in 1947, and was awarded an Honorary Doctorate of Laws from St. Thomas University (New Brunswick) in 1988 and an Honorary Doctorate of Literature from the University of New Brunswick in 1993.

While serving as Musicians In Residence at the UNB, Pach founded the Brunswick String Quartet and continued the free Friday noon hour recitals for another 17 years. The BSQ performed, toured, recorded and broadcast across Canada and throughout Eastern USA until 1989.

Pach also served as a tone judge for the Violin Society of America's 1984 International Competition.
