= Ontario Arts Council =

Arts council of the province of Ontario, Canada

- Formation: 1963
- Purpose: Support of art and artists in Ontario
- Headquarters: Toronto, Ontario
- Website: https://www.arts.on.ca/

The Ontario Arts Council (OAC) is a publicly funded Canadian organization in the province of Ontario whose purpose is to foster the creation and production of art for the benefit of all Ontarians. Based in Toronto, OAC was founded in 1963 by Ontario's Premier at the time, John Robarts.

== Operation ==
OAC plays a vital role in fostering the stability and growth of Ontario's arts community. An arm's-length agency of the Ministry of Culture, OAC offers more than fifty funding programs for Ontario-based artists and arts organizations.

Grants provide assistance for a specific activity, support for a period of time, or for ongoing operations. OAC administers the Premier's Awards for Excellence in the Arts, offers additional prizes as well as scholarships from private funds, and further supports Ontario's arts community by conducting research and statistical analyses of the arts and culture.

== Grant programs ==
OAC staff manage granting programs, while a 12-member volunteer board of directors oversees the fulfilment of the organization's mandate. The board of directors is appointed by the Government of Ontario for a three-year term (and may be re-appointed for one additional term).

OAC provides grants in three ways:

- Artistic discipline: crafts, dance, theatre, literature; music; visual and media arts.
- Artistic or other activity: arts education; community arts; touring; residencies; and capacity building/professional development.
- Cultural practice: Aboriginal Arts and Franco-Ontarian Arts.

=== List of awards ===
- Canadian Music Centre John Adaskin Award;
- Chalmers Arts Fellowships;
- Chalmers Professional Development Projects;
- Colleen Peterson Songwriting Award;
- Heinz Unger Award, given to young professional conductors;
- John Hirsch Director's Award, given to a promising theatre director;
- K.M. Hunter Artist Award, an annually awarded grant of $8000 (2021) to six individual artists in the areas of visual art, dance, theatre, literature, film and video, and music, who have demonstrated both talent and the potential for further development. Recommendations for the award are made by OAC;
- Leslie Bell Prize for Choral Conducting;
- Ontario Arts Council Indigenous Arts Award;
- Oskar Morawetz Award for Excellence in Music Performance;
- Pauline McGibbon Award;
- Vida Peene Fund – Canadian Art Acquisitions;
- Vida Peene Fund – The Vida Peene Orchestra Award.

== See also ==
- Ontario Arts Foundation
