= Stephanie Martin (composer) =

- Born: Tillsonburg, Ontario, Canada
- Genres: choral
- Occupation(s): Composer, conductor, organist
- Website: http://www.stephaniemartinmusic.com/

Stephanie Martin (born 1962) is a Canadian composer, conductor, and associate professor of music at York University's School of the Arts, Media, Performance and Design.

== Biography ==
Martin was born in Tillsonburg, Ontario. She began to learn music as a child, and once said "When I was a kid I listened obsessively to Machaut's Messe de Nostre Dame, written in the 14th century."

Martin holds a Bachelor's Degree in music from Wilfrid Laurier University, a Master of Arts degree from the University of Toronto, and an Associate Diploma from the Royal Canadian College of Organists. As of 2019, Martin is an associate professor in the music department at York University.

She is founder and director of the medieval music ensemble Schola Magdalena, spent 20 years from 1997 to 2017 as artistic director of Pax Christi Chorale, and worked as the music director and organist of the Church of Saint Mary Magdalene in Toronto.

== Partial list of works ==
Regarding her composition practices, Martin said in an interview "I don’t have a very healthy composition practice. I am a binger. I carve out blocks of time when I don’t do anything but compose. That means I neglect some other important things, but it does mean I can accomplish my writing goals very quickly and efficiently."

- Babel: A choral symphony (2015; Choral with full orchestra)
- When You Are Old (2016; various voices with piano)
- God So Loved The World (2017; SATB with two treble instruments)
- Sacred Songs for Small Choirs (2018; various voices, a capella)
- The Llandovery Castle (2018; opera for six singers, chorus, and chamber orchestra; libretto by Paul Ciufo)
- An Earthly Tree (2018; SATB with divisi)

=== The Llandovery Castle opera ===
Martin's first opera, The Llandovery Castle, is about the 1918 sinking of HMHS Llandovery Castle and was inspired when Martin noticed a commemorative plaque in honour of a nurse who died in the sinking and later suggested the idea to playwright Paul Ciufo who became the librettist. Ciufo used "a nurse's diary, articles and transcripts from a subsequent war crimes trial" as resources when dramatizing the story. The opera premiered on 26 June 2018 at Calvin Presbyterian Church in Toronto.

== Awards ==
- Recipient of Leslie Bell Prize for Choral Conducting (1998)
- First prize in the Exultate Chamber Singers’ composition competition (2009)
- First prize in the Association of Anglican Musicians composer's competition (2010)
