= Matthew White (countertenor) =

Canadian countertenor

- Born: 1973 (age 52–53); Ottawa, Ontario, Canada
- Education: McGill University
- Occupation: Countertenor

Matthew White (born 1973) is a Canadian countertenor.

== Career ==
Born in Ottawa, Ontario, White began singing as a treble with St Matthew's Men and Boys Choir in Ottawa and studied with Jan Simons in Montreal, Quebec. He graduated in English Literature from McGill University.

He and four other musicians created the ensemble Les Voix Baroques in 1999, specialising in Baroque and Renaissance material.

He has sung with Glyndebourne Festival Opera, New York City Opera, Houston Grand Opera, Cleveland Opera, and Opera Atelier. On June 9, 2003, White sang the roles of Evanthes and Bacchus in the first performance in modern times of Johann Georg Conradi's 1691 opera Ariadne at the Boston Early Music Festival. The studio recording with the same cast received a Grammy nomination for Best Opera Recording of 2005.

White was an active soloist in oratorio and on the concert stage, where he specialises in Baroque music. He has appeared at the Vancouver, Boston, and Utrecht Early Music Festivals and has sung with Tafelmusik Baroque Orchestra, Boston's Handel and Haydn Society, Les Violons du Roy, and Les Voix Humaines. In December 2010, he will sing in Handel's Messiah with Boston Baroque, a leading period instrument ensemble under the direction of Martin Pearlman. He is also the musical director and soloist of Montreal's Les Voix Baroques ensemble with whom he extensively tours.

Matthew White has recorded for the Naxos, Harmonia Mundi and Analekta labels. His recording, Elegeia won a 2004 Cannes Classical Award for best new early music solo recording.

White has now ceased to perform as a countertenor and has been Artist Director of Early Music Vancouver from the 2013 until 2020, and the CEO of the Victoria Symphony since 2020.

== Selected recordings ==
- Bach: Mass in B Minor Dorothee Mields (soprano); Johannette Zomer (soprano); Matthew White (alto); Charles Daniels (tenor); Peter Harvey; Netherlands Bach Society; Jos van Veldhoven conductor. (Channel Classics Records 25007)
- Bach: Cantatas BWV 27, 84, 95, & 161 Dorothee Mields (soprano); Matthew White (alto); Hans Jörg Mammel (tenor); Thomas Bauer (bass); Collegium Vocale Gent; Philippe Herreweghe conductor. (Harmonia Mundi HMC 901969)
- Buxtehude: Sacred Cantatas Matthew White (countertenor); Katherine Hill (soprano); Paul Grindlay (bass); Aradia Ensemble; Kevin Mallon conductor. (Naxos 8.557041)
- Elegeia Works by J.S. Bach, Biber, J.C. Bach, Schmelzer, Simpson, Blow, Purcell, Holborne, Byrd, and Tallis. Matthew White (countertenor); Les Voix Baroques. (Analekta 9902)
- Johann Georg Conradi: Ariadne Karina Gauvin (Ariadne), Barbara Borden (Phaedra), Marek Rzepka (Minos), Matthew White (Evanthes & Bacchus), Ellen Hargis (Pasiphae & Venus), James Taylor (Theseus), Julian Podger (Pirithous), Jan Kobow (Pamphilius); Boston Early Music Festival Orchestra and Chorus; Paul O'Dette and Stephen Stubbs, conductors. (CPO 777073-2)
