= Leslie Bell Prize for Choral Conducting =

Canadian conducting award

The Leslie Bell Prize for Choral Conducting is a $10 000 prize awarded by the Ontario Arts Council (OAC) every two years to support a selected choral conductor in furthering his/her professional career and enhancing his/her choral conducting abilities.

The award recognizes excellence in emerging conductors. Candidates are considered based on artistic merit as demonstrated by his or her abilities, cumulative body of work, and contribution to the art form.

The prize has not been awarded since 2018.

== History ==
In 1971, the Leslie Bell Singers Alumnae and friends of the late Leslie Richard Bell established the Leslie Bell Scholarship Fund as a tribute to the conductor. Bell was a choir conductor, educator, writer, arranger and composer.

In 1987, OAC reduced the award to a biennial prize cycle. In 2004, no award was made, and the prize was postponed while OAC undertook a review of the selection and adjudication process. No further awards have been made after 2018.

== Selection process ==
Choirs Ontario manages the selection process. Candidates submit a package composed of a curriculum vitae, letters of reference and audio-visual support material by mail to Choirs Ontario by the specified deadline.

Choirs Ontario assembles a selection panel of choral musicians to evaluate the submissions. Panelists must have the following qualifications; a broad spectrum of knowledge and experience in choral music, ability to provide fair and objective opinions, ability to articulate their opinions and to work in a group decision-making environment.

Prior to the selection meeting each panellist becomes familiar with the award and its assessment criteria. Additionally the panellist reviews each package submitted by the candidates and make reference notes in context to the award’s assessment criteria. Individuals selected to be on the panel are not to disclose their role. For transparency, the names of panellists is released with results following each competition. Upon discovering a conflict with any of the candidates, a panellist will remove themselves from the selection process.

At the selection meeting, all of the panellists review each of the candidate's submissions to come to a group decision and recommend the winner. The panel is required to keep the discussions during the panel meeting and contents of all submissions confidential.

== Eligibility ==
To be a candidate for this award, an individual must meet the following criteria;

- Professional conductor (past training and actively work in a professional capacity)
- Canadian citizen or permanent resident of Canada
- Resident in Ontario
- Recognized locally and regionally by his or her peers (those within the same artistic tradition and/or discipline) and recognized for his or her contribution to the field of music
- Within the first ten years of his/her professional career

== Past recipients ==
- 1973 Edward Moroney
- 1974 Robert Cooper
- 1975 David Christiani
- 1976 Carol E. Boyle
- 1977 Jean Ashworth Bartle
- 1978 Dr. Gerald Neufeld
- 1981 Brainerd Blyden-Taylor
- 1983 Richard Dacey
- 1984 Daniel A. Hanson
- 1985 David Fallis
- 1986 Laurence Ewashko
- 1987 No award made: biennial prize cycle introduced.
- 1990 Andrew Slonetsky
- 1992 William Brown
- 1994 Oksana Rodak
- 1996 Peter Nikiforuk
- 1998 Stephanie Martin, Pax Christi Chorale and Lynn Janes
- 2000 Bevan Keating (Mark Vuorinen received honourable mention)
- 2002 Teri Dunn, Jennifer Moir
- 2004 No award made: prize postponed while OAC undertook a review of the selection and adjudication process.
- 2006 Zimfira Poloz, Linda Beaupré (Isabel Bernaus and Marie-Claire Gervasoni received honourable mention)
- 2008 Ken Fleet
- 2010 Sarah Morrison
- 2012 Jamie Hillman (University of Toronto)
- 2014 Rachel Rensink-Hoff (Brock University)
- 2016 Mark Vuorinen (Waterloo University)
- 2018 Charlene Pauls
- 2023 Elaine Choi
- 2025 Kathleen Allan
