= Christopher O'Hoski =

Christopher O'Hoski (born in Ontario, Canada) is a painter from Stoney Creek, Ontario.

He studied at the Sheridan College, the Dundas Valley School of Art and The Royal Conservatory of Music. He also took part in workshops at the McMaster University, and the University of Toronto, and was mentored by fellow Canadian Joseph Devellano.

He primarily paints with acrylic and oil, but also makes use of watercolour.

"I'm not a master, and still have much to learn by any means. I continue to be inspired by everything I see and the look in every artists' eyes. I only hope to grow as an artist, try as many things as possible, and continue to have a mind open enough to continue to adapt and change."

He has exhibited in New York City, Toronto, Oakville, Mississauga, Burlington, Hamilton, Grimsby and Long Island. He has also been published in the textbook International Contemporary Artists Vol. 1. And his work is a part of various collections in Canada, the United States, and Australia.

He is affiliated with Artists In Canada, the Society of Canadian Artists, and the National Association for Visual Arts, in Australia.

He has taught at the Grimsby Public Art Gallery and Grumbacher.

His recent series 'Hypnagogia" has received international recognition.
