= Elmer Iseler =

Canadian choir conductor (1927–1998)

Elmer Walter Iseler
- Born: October 14, 1927; Port Colborne, Ontario, Canada
- Died: April 3, 1998 (aged 70); Caledon East, Ontario, Canada
- Occupation: Choral conductor
- Spouse(s): Trudy (Mosig) Iseler; Jessie (Balsillie) Iseler

Elmer Walter Iseler, OC OOnt (October 14, 1927 – April 3, 1998) was a Canadian choir conductor and choral editor. He was the conductor of the Toronto Mendelssohn Choir and founder of the Festival Singers of Canada and the Elmer Iseler Singers.

== Education ==
Elmer Iseler was born in 1927 in Port Colborne, Ontario, the son of a Lutheran minister. He studied piano and organ as a youth. In 1945, he enrolled in Waterloo College, an offshoot of Waterloo Lutheran Seminary that later evolved into Wilfrid Laurier University. There he studied organ and church music with Ulrich Leupold.

Iseler transferred to the Faculty of Music at the University of Toronto to finish his degree, graduating in 1950 with a Bachelor of Music. He then studied at the Ontario College of Education (now Ontario Institute for Studies in Education). While at OCE, he conducted the University of Toronto Symphony Orchestra, and the university's All-Varsity Mixed Chorus.

Iseler sang in the Toronto Mendelssohn Choir under the baton of Sir Ernest MacMillan, and in 1951-52 he apprenticed as an assistant rehearsal conductor.

== Career ==
In 1952, Iseler found work teaching orchestral and choral music in Toronto high schools, an occupation he continued until 1964. From 1965 to 1968, he returned to the University of Toronto to teach choral music.

In 1954, Iseler helped to found the Festival Singers of Toronto, later known as the Festival Singers of Canada, and conducted them until 1978. He then founded a professional chamber choir, the Elmer Iseler Singers. He conducted this choir until his death in 1998.

In 1964, Iseler succeeded Walter Susskind as conductor of the Toronto Mendelssohn Choir, a position he held until 1997. The Elmer Iseler Singers formed the core of the Toronto Mendelssohn Choir from their founding until 1997.

Iseler was widely regarded as a leading Canadian choral conductor. "He brought to the Festival Singers and the Mendelssohn Choir fresh discipline and versatility, eliciting stylistic resilience, fine tuning, and a healthy sound adaptable to music of all periods." In the 1980s and 1990s, he led his choirs at many national and international festivals and events. It is said that, in a long association between the Toronto Mendelssohn Choir and the Toronto Symphony Orchestra, Iseler conducted over 150 performances of Messiah by George Frideric Handel.

In 1975, Iseler was made an Officer of the Order of Canada "for his many services in the field of music in Canada, particularly for his development of the world-renowned Toronto Mendelssohn Choir". He was awarded the Order of Ontario in 1995. In 1997, he was named a Fellow of the Royal Conservatory of Music and an adjunct professor of Choral Music at the University of Toronto, where the Elmer Iseler singers became the official choir-in-residence. Following Iseler's death, the university created the Elmer Iseler Chair in Conducting.
