= Kevin Chen =

Kevin Chen may refer to:

- Kevin Chen (pianist)
- Kevin Chen (racing driver)
- Kevin Chen (writer)
