= Joan Barrett =

Canadian violinist and music teacher

Joan Barrett is a Canadian violinist and music teacher.

Barrett studied with Josef Gingold, David Zafer, Paul Rolland, Ivan Galamian and Ruggiero Ricci at Indiana University. She also studied the works of Moshé Feldenkrais, F. M. Alexander and Carol Ann Erickson. She taught violin and chamber music and led an orchestra at the Conservatory of the Mount Royal University (MRU), which she received with the "Distinguished Teaching Award". She continued teaching at the Royal Conservatory of the University of Toronto, where she was the coordinator of the Young Artists Performance Academy. Since then she has been an Academy Coach at the MRU Conservatory and teaches violin and chamber music at the University of Calgary. As a violinist, Barrett played chamber music, gave recitals and performed as an orchestral musician. She was principal of the Calgary Philharmonic Orchestra, assistant concert master of the Stratford Festival Orchestra and member of the Kensington Sinfonia .
