= Phil Nimmons =

Canadian jazz musician (1923–2024)

Phil Nimmons OC OONT

Background information
- Born: June 3, 1923; Kamloops, British Columbia, Canada
- Died: April 5, 2024 (aged 100) Thornhill, Ontario, Canada
- Genres: Jazz, classical
- Occupations: Musician; composer; arranger; educator
- Instrument: Clarinet
- Years active: 1948–2024
- Labels: Verve Records; RCA records; CBC Records; Sackville Records; MCC Records; Marquis; CMC records
- Website: www.philnimmons.ca

Phillip Rista Nimmons OC OOnt (June 3, 1923 – April 5, 2024) was a Canadian jazz clarinetist, composer, bandleader, and educator. Nimmons played "free jazz" and mainstream styles, and other genres including classical music. He composed more than 400 pieces in various genres, and for various instrumentations including film scores, music for radio and television, chamber music, music for large ensembles, concert band and symphony orchestras. He studied clarinet at the Juilliard School, and composition at the Royal Conservatory of Music.

He was involved in the development of the jazz performance program at the University of Toronto, and became its director emeritus in 1991. He also helped establish music education programs at University of Western Ontario, University of New Brunswick and the Banff Centre for Arts and Creativity. In 1974, Nimmons received the first Juno Award given in the Juno Awards jazz category, for his album Atlantic Suite. He was made an Officer of the Order of Canada in 1993, and was recipient of the Order of Ontario. In 2002, he received the Governor General's Performing Arts Award for his lifetime contribution to music.

== Early life and education ==
Philip Rista Nimmons was born in Kamloops, British Columbia, on June 3, 1923. He was raised in Vancouver, and began a career in jazz and classical music in 1948. He played as a jazz clarinetist in Vancouver during the late 1940s, appearing on CBC Radio with dance bands. He graduated from the University of British Columbia, then studied clarinet at the Juilliard School in New York City, and composition at the Royal Conservatory of Music in Toronto.

== Career ==
Nimmons established the "Nimmons 'n' Nine" ensemble in 1953, with whom he had a weekly show on CBC Radio. The ensemble grew to 16 musicians in 1965, renamed "Nimmons 'n' Nine Plus Six", and was active until 1980. The ensemble recorded nine albums from 1956 to 1976, toured regularly across Canada. Nimmons performed with smaller bands after 1980, and released the album "Sands of Time" with a quartet in 2001. He chose to remain in Canada for his career despite that many of Canadian colleagues went to the United States. In a 2023 interview, he revealed that he stayed because, "If everybody left, we're not going to have anybody to create a musical scene in Canada".

Nimmons was a founder of the Canadian League of Composers. As an educator, he made substantial contributions to the study of jazz music. Along with Oscar Peterson and Ray Brown in the 1960s, Nimmons founded the Advanced School of Contemporary Music in Toronto. The institution was one of the first such schools to offer formal jazz training, but it lasted only a few years. He was involved in the development of the jazz performance program at the University of Toronto, joining in 1973. He became director emeritus of the University of Toronto degree program in jazz studies there in 1991. He also helped establish music education programs at University of Western Ontario, University of New Brunswick and the Banff Centre for Arts and Creativity. He spent summers teaching at youth music camps.

In addition to free jazz, Nimmons played other genres including classical music. He composed more than 400 pieces in various genres, and for various instrumentations including film scores, music for radio and television, chamber music, music for large ensembles, concert band and symphony orchestras. His composition "The Torch" was commissioned for the 1988 Winter Olympics in Calgary, performed by a big band led by Rob McConnell. Other compositions by Nimmons include "Sleeping Beauty and the Lions" for concert band premiered at Expo 86, and "Moods and Contrasts" for the Esprit Orchestra in 1994.

== Personal life and death ==
Nimmons met his wife Noreen Liëse Spencer at the Royal Conservatory of Music, and had three children. His wife was a concert pianist, who died in 2002 after 52 years of marriage. His daughter Holly, is the chief executive officer of the Canadian Music Centre. His sister Arlene Nimmons Pach was a classical pianist.

He turned 100 on June 3, 2023, and died at his home in Thornhill, Ontario, on April 5, 2024.

== Awards and honours ==
In 1974, Nimmons received the first Juno Award given in the Juno Awards jazz category, for his album Atlantic Suite. In 1993, he was made an Officer of the Order of Canada. He was also a recipient of the Order of Ontario. In 2001, Nimmons was a recipient of the Jazz Education Hall of Fame which honours "individuals whose musical contributions and dedication to jazz education over the past 25 years have created new directions and curricular innovations for jazz education worldwide". In 2002, Nimmons received the Governor General's Performing Arts Award, Canada's highest honour in the performing arts, for his lifetime contribution to popular music. On November 21, 2005, the Society of Composers, Authors and Music Publishers of Canada recognized Nimmons with the Lifetime Achievement Award. He received the DownBeat Achievement Award for jazz education in 2006, and the Jazz Report and National Jazz Award as clarinettist of the year for 13 consecutive years, from 1995 to 2008.

== Legacy ==
CBC Music posthumously referred to Nimmons as the "Dean of Canadian Jazz", and wrote that he "influenced generations of musicians, music teachers and audiences". Canadian jazz trumpeter Daniel Hersog felt that Nimmons was "a true one-of-a-kind — a true trailblazer in jazz education", and that stated that "So many current jazz musicians owe what they do to Phil".

A legacy fund at the Canadian Music Centre was named for Nimmons. His grandson, Sean Nimmons-Paterson, led the Nimmons Tribute jazz band which included former collegaues, students and friends of Nimmons. The band released two albums: To the Nth (2020) and Generational (2023).

== Discography ==
- The Canadian Scene Via the Phil Nimmons Group (Verve, 1956)
- Nimmons 'n' Nine (Verve, 1959)
- Take Ten (RCA, 1963)
- Mary Poppins Swings (RCA, 1964)
- Strictly Nimmons (RCA, 1965; OCLC 49133976)
- Nimmons Now (CBC, 1970)
- Jazz Canadiana: All Star Jazz In Concert (CBC, 1973; OCLC 10935354)
- The Atlantic Suite (Sackville, 1974)
- Transformations/Invocation (CBC, 1976)
- The Canadian Scene Via Phil Nimmons/Nimmons 'N' Nine (New York, Verve, 1999; OCLC 7420108921)
- Sands of Time (Sackville, 2001)
- Vintage Nimmons 'n' Nine CBC Air Checks '59–'64 (Sackville, 2003)
- Beginnings: Nimmons'n'Braid (2004)
- Nimmons 'n nitecap (Vancouver, Capilano College, 2005; OCLC 225580285)
- Nimmons 'n' Nine—now (MCCO records, 2008; OCLC 1060995616)
- Beginnings (Nimmons 'n' Music, 2009; OCLC 70693728)
- Friendly encounter (Marquis, 2009)
- Canadian Composer Portrait: Phil Nimmons (CMC, 2009)
- Suite St.John's, Falling Through: Nimmons'n'Braid (2012)

== See also ==
- List of clarinetists
