= Vier Lieder (Schoenberg) =

1899 song cycle by Arnold Schoenberg

- Song cycle by Arnold Schoenberg
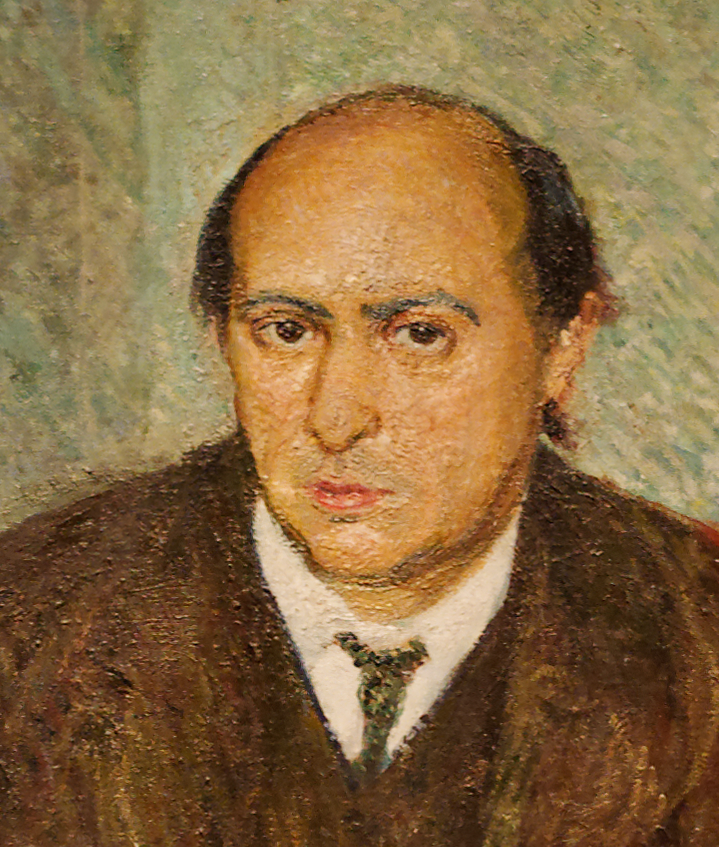
- Arnold Schönberg by Richard Gerstl, 1905
- Opus: 2
- Text: poems by Richard Dehmel
- Language: German
- Composed: 1899–1900
- Movements: 4 songs
- Scoring: voice and piano

Vier Lieder, Op. 2, is a song cycle composed by Arnold Schoenberg in 1899 and 1900, during his early development. In contrast to his earlier songs, influenced by Richard Wagner and Johannes Brahms among others, these four songs use a fair amount of the dissonance and atonality that Schoenberg is known for.

== Poetry ==
The first three of the poems that Schoenberg set in Vier Lieder were written by Richard Dehmel, while the last one was written by Johannes Schlaf. Dehmel, known for naturalistic and expressionist writing, published a collection titled Weib und Welt (Woman and World) in 1896. He was convicted of obscenity and blasphemy based on this collection, based on a single poem, "Venus Consolatrix", which compared Mary Magdalene to the Roman goddess Aphrodite, the symbol of beauty, life, and sexuality. Schoenberg was inspired by Dehmel's poetry to explore new forms of tonality.

== Composition ==
=== Structure ===
The four songs are:

1. Erwartung
2. Jesus bettelt (Schenk mir deinen goldenen Kamm)
3. Erhebung
4. Waldsonne

The duration is given as 12 minutes.

=== Tonality ===
Vier Lieder are known to be composed at the beginning of Schoenberg's break from tonality. Many of his earlier songs were reminiscent of the Romantic Era, influenced from Richard Wagner and Johannes Brahms. He wrote in his didactic publications that he was inspired by Brahms in his early works. In the first song of Vier Lieder, "Erwartung" (Expectation), a direct evidence of Wagnerian influence is evident, especially in the middle section. The key center happens to modulate several times around the circle of fifths and ends on the home key. This same form of harmonic progression can be found in the second act of Wagner's Tannhäuser.

In Vier Lieder overall, there is much less use of typical cadential movement. Schoenberg made use of mediants and sub-mediants of the home keys, prolonging harmonies or providing surface harmonies. The four songs mostly remain in a ternary form with slight modifications. For example in the second song of the cycle, Schenk mir deinen goldenen Kamm, the form can be considered ternary since it has a short recapitulation.
