= Frances James (soprano) =

Canadian soprano

- Born: 3 February 1903; Saint John, New Brunswick
- Died: 22 August 1988 (aged 85) Victoria, British Columbia
- Occupation: Soprano

Frances James, also known by her married name Frances James Adaskin, (3 February 1903 – 22 August 1988) was a Canadian soprano who specialized in concert repertoire. A prolific performer, she appeared on CBC Radio and as a recitalist from the late 1920s through the 1950s, premiering works by Canadian composers and championing the works of contemporary international composers. Her performances were noted for their musical intelligence and sophistication. James's artistry was admired by composers such as Benjamin Britten, Paul Hindemith and Darius Milhaud. While her performances, both live and recorded, were mainly of the concert repertoire, she did perform in some operas including the 1929 premiere of Healey Willan's ballad opera, Prince Charlie and Flora.

== Early life and education ==
The daughter of journalist Fred James, Mary Frances James was born on 3 February 1903 in Saint John, New Brunswick. She spent her early childhood in Halifax where the family moved in the year that she was born. In 1910 the James family moved again to Montreal, and soon after Frances became active as a singer in a children's chorus at the age of 9. She attended the High School of Montreal (HSM) where she was part of the graduating class of 1921. She never earned her high diploma as a heart condition forced her to withdraw from school when she was 17.

James was highly involved in church music growing up, and received early music training from Duncan MacKenzie at HSM. Under MacKenzie's suggestion and support, she enrolled at the McGill Conservatorium (MC) in 1919 while still a high school student at the age of 16. She studied at MC on a four year scholarship, and was a pupil of Walter Clapperton (voice) Clara Lichenstein, and Alfred Whitehead. While a student at MC she was a featured soloist in the school's 43rd orchestral concert singing music by Felix Mendelssohn and Mikhail Glinka in the hall of Royal Victoria College in December 1922. She was a soloist in many other MC concerts.

James later continued her vocal training with Emmy Heim with whom she began studying lieder at the Toronto Conservatory of Music in 1934. She continued to study with Heim for several years, and also studied voice with soprano Jeanne Dusseau in 1936. Later she went to New York City where she was a pupil of Enrico Rosati and Maria Kurenko, and to Boston to study with Roland Hayes. She married Canadian violinist, teacher, and composer Murray Adaskin on July 16, 1931.

== Career and later life ==
James began working as a professional church singer at the age of 17 when she was first hired to perform as a soloist at St. James United Church. She later became a resident soprano on the music staff of that church from 1925 through 1929. She made her debut as a radio singer in 1924 on a Northern Electric broadcast. She was a frequent soloist at the CPR Festivals in the late 1920s. In 1929 she starred in the premiere of Healey Willan's ballad opera, Prince Charlie and Flora.

The height of James's singing career was from the 1930s through the 1950s during which time she was a frequent recitalist, and a regular singer on CBC Radio programs like Distinguished Artist, Friendly Music, Canadian Mosaic, Footlights, and Midweek Recital. She also appeared with some frequency as a soloists in concerts with Canadian and American symphony orchestras during this period. In the 1930s and 1940s she was employed by the Canadian Pacific Railway to give recitals in their hotel chain. During the 1939 royal tour of Canada, James performed for King George VI and Queen Elizabeth at the Banff Springs Hotel.

James was recognized as a champion of contemporary Canadian composers, and during her career she performed the world premiere of works created by more the 25 living composers from her country. She herself organized a concert series consisting of 22 events which featured new Canadian music. Her interest in contemporary music extended beyond Canada, and she performed the Canadian premieres of works by contemporary foreign composers like Benjamin Britten, Aaron Copland, Paul Hindemith, and Darius Milhaud among others.

In 1951 she sang a benefit recital at the New Brunswick Museum with all of funds raised through ticket sales going directly to support the museum.

From 1952 to 1973 she taught voice at the University of Saskatchewan. She subsequently taught at the Victoria Conservatory of Music and the University of Victoria. Her pupils included mezzo-soprano Dorothy Howard, soprano Jane Leslie MacKenzie, and tenor Richard Margison.

In 1984 she was awarded the Canadian Music Council Medal. In 1987 she and her husband were honored by the University of Victoria with a six week long music festival entitled "The Adaskin Years — A Celebration of Canada's Art".

James died at Victoria General Hospital in Victoria, British Columbia on 22 August 1988 at the age of 85.
