= Jon Vickers =

Canadian opera singer

Jon Vickers CC
- Born: Jonathan Stewart Vickers; October 29, 1926; Prince Albert, Saskatchewan, Canada
- Died: July 10, 2015 (aged 88); Ontario, Canada
- Education: The Royal Conservatory
- Occupation: Opera singer (tenor)
- Organizations: Royal Opera House; Metropolitan Opera
- Known for: Jon Vickers had 5 children Allison, William, Jonathan, Kenneth and Wendy. Actor Rowan Vickers is a grandson of Jon Vickers
- Awards: Governor General's Awards

Jonathan Stewart Vickers (October 29, 1926 – July 10, 2015), known professionally as Jon Vickers, was a world renowned Canadian heldentenor.

In 1957 Vickers joined London’s Royal Opera House, Covent Garden company. In 1960 he joined the Metropolitan Opera.

Vickers became world-famous for a wide range of German, French, and Italian roles, but especially in the Wagner tenor roles in Die Walkure, Tristan und Isolde, Parsifal and in Beethoven's Fidelio. He was the foremost Wagner tenor of his era.

Vickers performed operas with prominent conductors such as Otto Klemperer, Herbert von Karajan, Sir Colin Davis, Hans Knappertsbusch, and Sir Thomas Beecham. With Karajan he recorded several operas accompanied by the Berlin Philharmonic Orchestra.

== Background and education ==
Born in Prince Albert, Saskatchewan, Vickers was the sixth in a family of eight children. In 1950, he was awarded a scholarship to study opera at The Royal Conservatory of Music in Toronto.

Vickers was born into the musical family of William, a teacher and school principal, and Myrle (née Mossop). As a youth he sang in his father's church, and his initial intention was to study medicine. He worked on a neighbour's farm and acquired the muscular stature that characterized him. During a semi-professional production his leading lady made a recording of his voice and sent it to The Royal Conservatory of Music in Toronto. He auditioned there with Every Valley Shall be Exalted from Handel's Messiah and was offered a scholarship.

Vickers studied with George Lambert at The Royal Conservatory of Music and sang professionally in Canada from the early- to mid-1950s. In 1952 he won the Nos futures étoiles competition on CBC Radio.

== International career ==
His international career began with his 1957 Covent Garden Riccardo in Verdi's Un ballo in maschera. He continued to appear at Covent Garden into the 1980s, putting his personal stamp on the roles of Énée in Berlioz's Les Troyens, Radamès in Verdi's Aida and the title role in his Don Carlo, Handel's Samson, Florestan in Beethoven's Fidelio, Tristan in Tristan und Isolde, Canio in Leoncavallo's Pagliacci, and the title role in Britten's Peter Grimes. Some critics praised Vickers' Tristan as the best since Lauritz Melchior's.

On 20 November 1957, Vickers sang the title role in a performance of The Dream of Gerontius by Sir Edward Elgar in Rome conducted by Sir John Barbirolli with the RAI Rome Symphony Orchestra and Chorus.

Vickers gained major international recognition in both the U.S. and the UK in the role of Giasone in Luigi Cherubini's Medea, with Maria Callas in the title role, at both Dallas Civic Opera in November 1958 and the following season at Covent Garden in June 1959. This was a joint co-production between Dallas and Covent Garden. Vickers and Callas both emphasized dramatic skills as well as singing ability, and they worked well together, Vickers stating that “when we finished the big love duet, she flew across the stage and put her arms around me and said, 'At last, a tenor who can act!'” The same production was staged at La Scala in Milan in 1961-1962, again with Callas and Vickers heading the cast.

He debuted at the Bayreuth Festival in 1958 as Siegmund in Die Walküre and sang Parsifal there in 1964, both presentations conducted by legendary Wagner conductor Hans Knappertsbusch. Later negotiations with Wieland Wagner concerning potential appearances as Siegfried in Götterdämmerung ceased on Wieland's death in 1966.

Vickers' debut role at the Metropolitan Opera in 1960 was Canio in Pagliacci. He would appear at the Met over a period of 27 years in 280 performances of 17 roles, including Florestan in Fidelio, Siegmund in Die Walküre, Don José in Bizet's Carmen, Radamès in Aida, Erik in Wagner's Der fliegende Holländer, Herman in Tchaikovsky's Queen of Spades, Samson in both Handel's oratorio and Saint-Saëns' Samson et Dalila, the title role of Verdi's Otello, Don Alvaro in Verdi's La forza del destino, Peter Grimes, Tristan und Isolde, Laca in Janáček's Jenůfa, Vasek in Smetana's The Bartered Bride, and the title role in Wagner's Parsifal, giving his farewell in 1987.

Although scheduled to sing Tannhäuser at Covent Garden in the late 1970s, Vickers dropped out, claiming that he could not empathize with the character and that the opera itself was blasphemous. He sang Nerone in Monteverdi's L'incoronazione di Poppea at the Paris Opéra. His repertoire also included the title role in Giordano's Andrea Chenier, Herod in Strauss's Salome, and Pollione in Bellini's Norma.

In addition, he sang rarely heard roles such as Cellini in Berlioz's Benvenuto Cellini, Ratan-Sen in Roussel's Padmavati and Sergei in Shostakovitch's Lady Macbeth of the Mtsensk District. Many critics praised his interpretation of Otello, which he recorded: in both 1960 with Tullio Serafin and 1973 with Karajan. Vickers also was a long time collaborator with American pianist Richard Woitach.

Vickers became one of Karajan's favourite singers at the Salzburg Easter and Summer Festivals, performing there in Der Ring des Nibelungen, Carmen, Otello, Fidelio and Tristan und Isolde. He sang as well in the major opera houses of Chicago, San Francisco and Vienna. He retired in 1988.

== Recordings ==
Among Vickers's celebrated recordings are the 1962 Fidelio conducted by Otto Klemperer with the Philharmonia Orchestra and the 1971 version with the Berlin Philharmonic under Karajan.. His studio recordings of Wagner roles are Die Walküre in 1961 with conductor Erich Leinsdorf and the London Symphony Orchestra and in 1966 with Karajan and the Berlin Philharmonic, and Tristan und Isolde in 1971-1972, again with Karajan and the Berlin Philharmonic. Vickers' most critically acclaimed extant performance of Parsifal is from the Bayreuth Festival in 1964 under Knappertsbusch, which was the great conductor's final performance.

His recording of Énée in Les Troyens with Sir Colin Davis conducting the Royal Opera House Orchestra in 1969 was highly regarded. Also, there was a legendary and controversial 1959 recording of Messiah with Sir Thomas Beecham. Vickers' later albums included highly acclaimed renditions of Peter Grimes conducted by Sir Colin Davis with the orchestra of the Royal Opera House, Covent Garden and of Otello conducted by Karajan with the Berlin Philharmonic.

== Vocal style ==
Vickers' huge, powerful voice and solid technique met the demands of many German, French and Italian roles. He was also highly regarded for his powerful stage presence and thoughtful characterizations. (Conversely, he was sometimes incorrectly criticized for "scooping"—beginning a note below pitch and then sliding up to the correct pitch—and for "crooning".) While his soft singing was often dismissed by critics as “crooning” or falsetto, it was actually an enveloping, fully supported sound, seeming to come from all around the theater.

== Personal life and death ==
Vickers was too young to serve in World War II, although two older brothers experienced heavy action in the conflict, one becoming a prisoner of war. Vickers was always strongly anti-Hitler in his statements and judgments, including the role of Wagner's philosophy in influencing the Nazis.

During the Bayreuth Festival of 1964, when Vickers was billeted at a local house, he was offended by some favourable remarks made by the house owner about the period under Nazi rule. Vickers declined further roles at the Bayreuth Festival.

Vickers was a dedicated, outspoken Protestant; one writer referred to him as "God's tenor" for this reason.

In 1953 he married Henrietta Outerbridge. They had five children. After her death in 1991, he married Judith Stewart.

Vickers died of Alzheimer's disease on July 10, 2015, in Ontario.

== Honours ==
In 1968 he was made a Companion of the Order of Canada. Vickers received the Governor General's Performing Arts Award for Lifetime Artistic Achievement, Canada's highest honour in the performing arts, in 1998.

== Discography ==
Vickers was recorded in dozens of performances, including:

=== Opera recordings ===
- Énée in Berlioz's Les Troyens, with conductor Rafael Kubelik, live recording from the Royal Opera, Covent Garden 1957
- Giasone in Cherubini's Medea, with conductor Nicola Rescigno, live recording from Dallas Civic Opera 1958
- Don Carlo in Verdi's Don Carlo, with conductor Carlo Maria Giulini, live recording from the Royal Opera House, Covent Garden 1958.
- Siegmund in Wagner's Die Walküre, with conductor Hans Knappertsbusch, live recording from the Bayreuth Festival 1958
- Giasone in Cherubini's Medea, with conductor Nicola Rescigno, ICA live recording from the Royal Opera House, Covent Garden 1959
- Otello in Verdi's Otello, with conductor Tullio Serafin, RCA Victor 1960
- Florestan in Beethoven's Fidelio, with conductor Karl Böhm, Sony, live recording from the Metropolitan Opera 1960
- Siegmund in Wagner's Die Walküre, with conductor Erich Leinsdorf, RCA-Decca 1961
- Radamès in Verdi's Aida, with conductor Sir Georg Solti, RCA-Decca 1961
- Florestan in Beethoven's Fidelio, with conductor Otto Klemperer, EMI 1961
- Samson in Saint-Saëns' Samson and Delilah, with conductor Georges Prêtre, EMI 1962
- Gustavo III in Verdi's Un ballo in maschera, with conductor Edward Downes, live recording from the Royal Opera House, Covent Garden 1962
- Parsifal in Wagner's Parsifal, with conductor Hans Knappertsbusch, live recording from the Bayreuth Festival 1964
- Siegmund in Wagner's Die Walküre, with conductor Herbert von Karajan, Deutsche Grammophon 1966
- Siegmund in Wagner's Die Walküre, with conductor Berislav Klobucar, Sony, live recording from the Metropolitan Opera 1968
- Énée in Berlioz's Les Troyens, with conductor Colin Davis, Philips 1969.
- Don José in Bizet's Carmen, with conductor Rafael Frühbeck de Burgos, EMI 1969–70
- Florestan in Beethoven's Fidelio, with conductor Herbert von Karajan, EMI 1970
- Tristan in Wagner's Tristan und Isolde, with conductor Herbert von Karajan, EMI 1971–72
- Otello in Verdi's Otello, with conductor Herbert von Karajan, EMI 1973
- Pollione in Bellini's Norma, with conductor Giuseppe Patanè, live recording from the Festival d'Orange 1974
- Cellini in Berlioz's Benvenuto Cellini, with conductor Sarah Caldwell, VAI 1975
- Grimes in Britten's Peter Grimes, with conductor Colin Davis, Philips 1978

=== Oratorio and concert music recordings ===
- Gerontius in Elgar'sThe Dream of Gerontius, with conductor Sir John Barbirolli, live recording Rome 1957
- Samson in Handel's Samson, with conductor Raymond Leppard, live recording from the Royal Opera House, Covent Garden 1959
- Handel: Messiah, with conductor Sir Thomas Beecham, RCA Victor 1959
- Vaughan Williams: Serenade to Music, with conductor Leonard Bernstein, Sony, live recording from Lincoln Center NY 1962
- Verdi: Requiem, with conductor Sir John Barbirolli, EMI 1969–70
- Mahler: Das Lied von der Erde, with conductor Sir Colin Davis, Philips 1981
- Beethoven: Symphony No. 9, "Choral", with conductor Zubin Mehta, RCA Red Seal, live recording from Lincoln Center NY, 1983

=== Recital recordings ===
- Italian Opera Arias: Arias by Cilea, Flotow, Giordano, Leoncavallo, Ponchielli, Puccini and Verdi, with conductor Tullio Serafin, RCA Victor 1961.
- Franz Schubert: Winterreise with pianist Geoffrey Parsons, EMI 1983
- Franz Schubert: Winterreise with pianist Peter Schaaf, VAI 1995
- Richard Strauss: Enoch Arden, Op. 38, with pianist Marc-André Hamelin, VAI 2006

== Videos ==
- Don Jose in Bizet's Carmen, with conductor Herbert von Karajan 1967 (shot in studio)
- Canio in Leoncavallo's Pagliacci, with conductor Herbert von Karajan 1968 (shot in studio)
- Pollione in Bellini's Norma, with conductor Giuseppe Patanè 1974 (taped live)
- Vasek in Smetana's The Bartered Bride, with conductor James Levine 1978 (taped live)
- Peter Grimes in Britten's Peter Grimes, with conductor Colin Davis 1981 (taped live)

== Bibliography ==
- Kuhn, Laura (ed.). "Vickers, Jon(athan) Stewart" in Baker's Student Encyclopedia of Music: R-Z, p. 1952. Schirmer Books, 1999. ISBN 0-02-865315-7
- Macdonnell, W.M. and Norman, Barbara. "Vickers, Jonathan Stewart". The Canadian Encyclopedia
- Jon Vickers: A Hero's Life by Jeannie Williams, Northeastern University Press, 1999. ISBN 1-55553-408-2
