= Singing Stars of Tomorrow =

Singing Stars of Tomorrow was a singing competition show broadcast on CBC Radio from 1943 to 1956. It featured young singers performing classical songs and competing for cash prizes. The show was initially sponsored by York Knitting Mills, and then by Canadian Industries Limited. It aired on Sunday afternoons.

Because it began during World War II, the show initially featured only female singers. Male singers began to compete in 1947. The grand prize was initially $1000, and increased to $2000 in 1953.

In 1947, the CBC began airing a French-language counterpart, Nos futures étoiles, as well as the talent show Opportunity Knocks, which, unlike Singing Stars of Tomorrow, included pop singers and other performers such as instrumentalists and actors.
