= CKVL-FM =

Radio station in LaSalle, Quebec

- LaSalle, Quebec; Canada
- Broadcast area: Montreal, Quebec
- Frequency: 100.1 MHz
- Branding: FM 100,1 Radio LaSalle

Programming
- Language: French / English
- Format: community

Ownership
- Owner: La Radio Communautaire de Ville Lasalle

History
- First air date: January 8, 2008
- Call sign meaning: Homage to the original CKVL, later CINF

Technical information
- Licensing authority: CRTC
- Class: A
- ERP: 110 watts (average); 870 watts (peak)
- HAAT: 40.4 metres (133 ft)
- Transmitter coordinates: 45°25′42″N 73°39′40″W

Links
- Website: ckvl.fm

CKVL-FM (100.1 FM, "FM 100,1 Radio LaSalle") is a community radio station located in Montreal, Quebec, Canada. The station is owned and operated by La radio communautaire de Ville LaSalle, a non-profit organization.

The station primarily serves the Montreal borough of Lasalle, which is also the location of their studios and transmitter. Most of the station's programming is in French; however, the station is also authorized to use English.

The station is a member of the Association des radiodiffuseurs communautaires du Québec.
