= Jean Ashworth Bartle =

Canadian music conductor (born 1947)

Jean Ashworth Bartle, CM OOnt (born 7 March 1947 Littleborough, Lancashire, England) is a Canadian choral conductor, teacher, and Founder/Conductor Laureate of the Toronto Children's Chorus.

Bartle became a naturalized Canadian in 1968 and received an ARCT in performance in 1970, ARCT in teaching in 1973, and a Bachelor's with Honours from the University of Toronto in 1977. Jean Ashworth Bartle won the 1977 Leslie Bell Scholarship (Prize), and the 1982 Sir Ernest MacMillan Scholarship, which enabled her to study with Sir David Willcocks and Margaret Hillis at Westminster Choir College, Princeton, New Jersey.

== Choral conductor ==
Bartle founded the Toronto Children's Chorus (TCC) in 1978 to provide a children's choir for the Toronto Symphony Orchestra. She stepped down as artistic choir director in 2007, after 29 years at the helm.

== Teacher ==
Bartle was a teacher for the Toronto Board of Education 1966-1998, including a period as director of the music program at Howard Public School in Toronto 1970-89, and of the junior choirs at Kingsway Lambton United Church. She had many music friends in the Howard Park neighborhood. Students of Howard Park learned to play piano and other musical instruments at private homes in the Howard Park neighborhood. Girls with low voices were encouraged to learn a musical instrument and boys with high voices were encouraged to also learn a musical instrument. She was also a member of the Toronto Mendelssohn Choir. She is highly active as a choral clinician, adjudicator and guest conductor throughout North America, Europe, Israel, South Africa, st, and the Pacific Rim. She holds an annual choral conductors' symposium that attracts choir directors from around the world.

== Publications ==
Bartle has written two books; Lifeline for Children's Choir Directors (Toronto 1988) and Sound Advice: Becoming a Better Children's Choir Director (New York 2003) She also edits three choral music series.

== Awards ==
In 1977 Bartle was awarded the Leslie Bell Prize for Choral Conducting. In 1986 she was awarded the Roy Thomson Hall Award for her outstanding contribution to musical life in Toronto. In 1998 she was invested in the Order of Ontario, and also received the Order of Canada. In 2002 she received the Queen Elizabeth II Golden Jubilee Medal in London, and in November 2003 she was awarded an honorary life membership in the Ontario Music Educators' Association. In 2004, an award named in her honour, the Jean Ashworth Bartle Music Education Award, was established at the Faculty of Music at the University of Toronto.
