= Herman Geiger-Torel =

Canadian opera director (1907–1976)

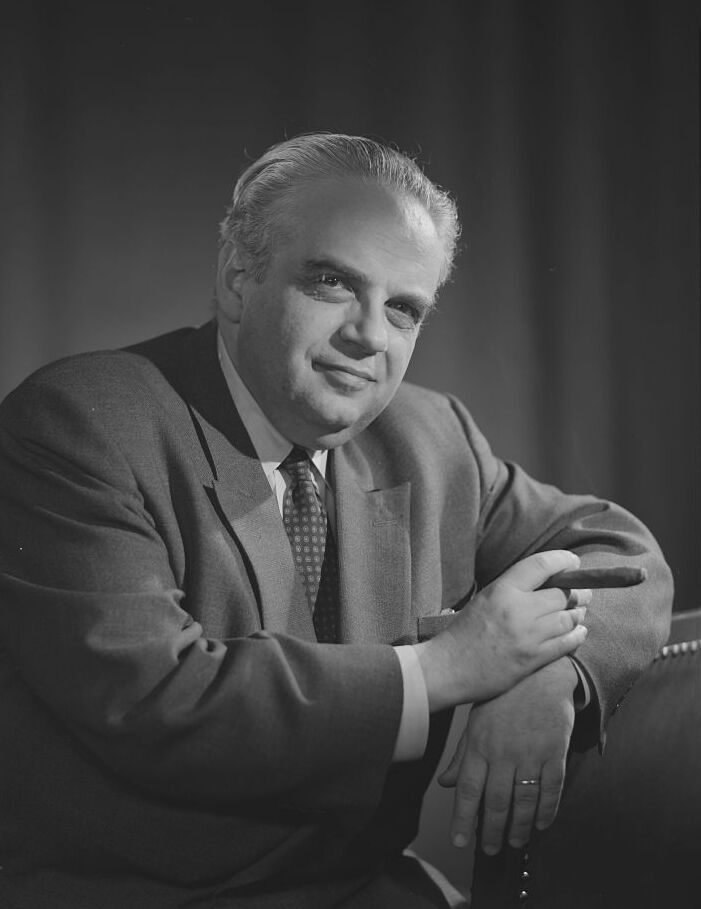
- Geiger-Torel, c. 1961
- Born: July 13, 1907; Frankfurt-am-Main, Grand Duchy of Hesse
- Died: October 6, 1976 (aged 69); Toronto, Ontario, Canada

Herman Geiger-Torel, OC (July 13, 1907 – October 6, 1976) was a Canadian opera director.

In 1969, he was made an Officer of the Order of Canada.
