= The Royal Conservatory of Music =

Canadian non-profit music education institution

Coordinates: 43°40′4.7″N 79°23′46.50″W

- Established: 1886; 140 years ago
- Founder: Edward Fisher
- Type: Music school
- Legal status: Active
- Purpose: To develop human potential through music and the arts
- Location(s): 273 Bloor Street West; Toronto, Ontario; M5S 1W2
- Region served: Canada, US, UK
- Official language: English
- Chairman: Tim Price
- President and CEO: Alexander Brose
- Patron: Charles III
- Website: rcmusic.com

The Royal Conservatory of Music (RCM; French: Conservatoire royal de musique (Note: For use in Canada, in accordance with the country's policy of official bilingualism.)), branded as The Royal Conservatory, is a non-profit music education institution and performance venue headquartered in Toronto, Ontario, Canada. It was founded in 1886 by Edward Fisher as The Toronto Conservatory of Music. In 1947, King George VI incorporated the organization through royal charter. Its Toronto home was designated a National Historic Site of Canada in 1995, in recognition of the institution's influence on music education in Canada. Tim Price is the chair of the board, and Alexander Brose is the president and CEO.

== History ==
=== Early history ===
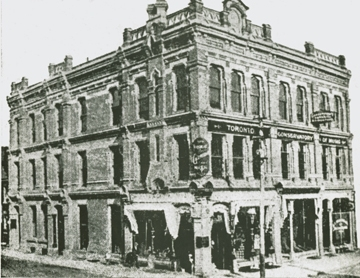
The original home of The Toronto Conservatory of Music in 1886

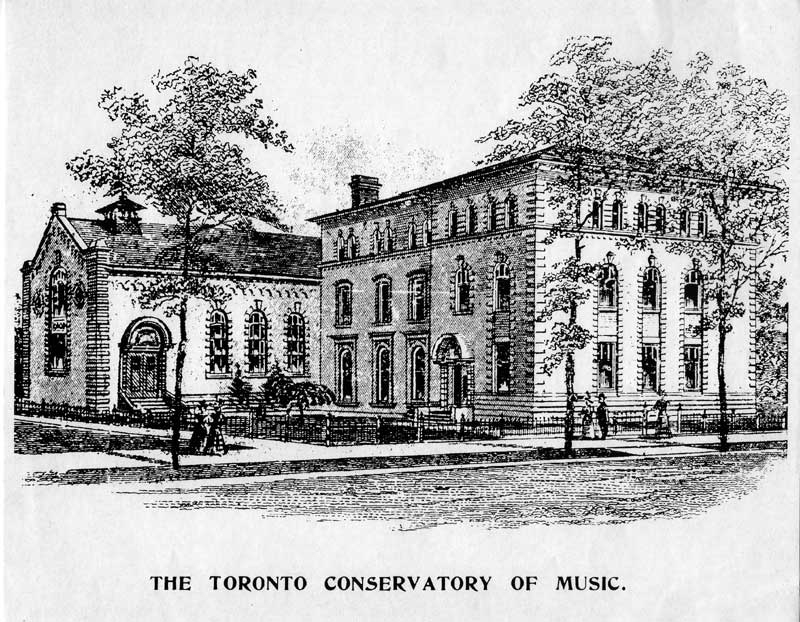
The Toronto Conservatory of Music at southwest corner of College Street and University Avenue, c. 1897

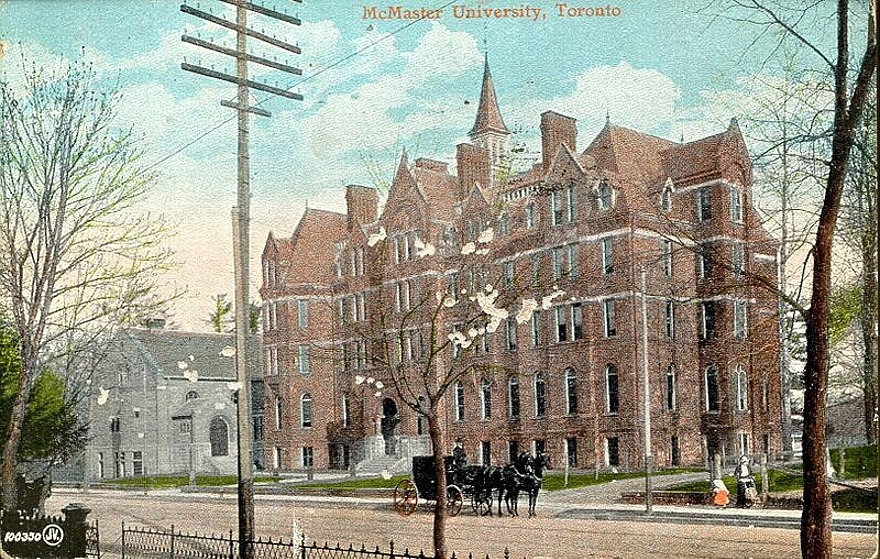
McMaster Hall (right - c. 1881) and Castle Memorial Hall (left - c. 1901) c. 1906

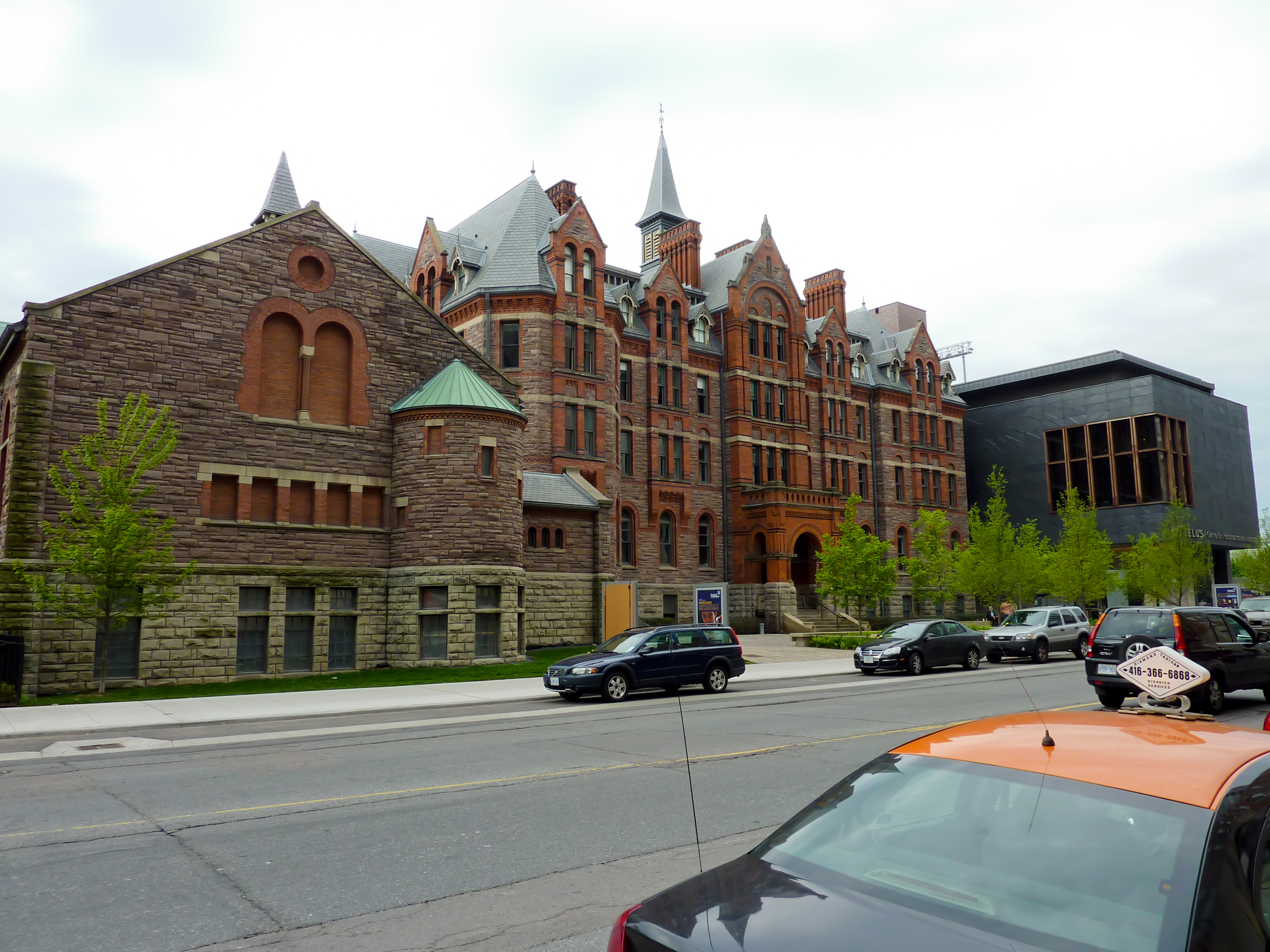
The Royal Conservatory of Music on Bloor Street West in 2011

The conservatory was founded in 1886 as The Toronto Conservatory of Music and opened in September 1887, located on two floors above a music store at the corner of Dundas Street (Wilton Street) and Yonge Street (at today's Sankofa Square). Its founder Edward Fisher was a young organist born in the United States. The conservatory became the first institution of its kind in Canada: a school dedicated to the training of singers and instrumentalists, and also to instilling a love of music in young children. In its first year, it hired Italian musician and composer Francesco D'Auria to teach at the conservatory.

The conservatory's initial intake was just over 100, and by its second quarter this number had grown to nearly 300 as its reputation quickly spread. In 1897, the organization purchased a new property at College Street and University Avenue (now site of the Intact Centre) to accommodate its rapid expansion. From its earliest days, it was affiliated with the University of Toronto with the purpose of preparing students for degree examinations and shared its premises with the University of Toronto, Faculty of Music from 1919.

In 1906, Frank Welsman – who became the principal of the conservatory – founded and directed the Toronto Conservatory Orchestra, which became the Toronto Symphony Orchestra two years later.

=== Toronto College of Music and Canadian Academy of Music ===
The period between 1918 and 1924 witnessed a series of mergers among music conservatories in Toronto. The Toronto College of Music was founded in 1888 by conductor F.H. Torrington, and became the first music conservatory affiliated with the University of Toronto. After Torrington's death in 1917, the school merged with the Canadian Academy of Music in 1918. The academy itself had been founded in 1911 by Albert Gooderham, who financed the school out of his own personal fortune and served as the school's only president during its 13-year history. The academy, in turn, merged into the Toronto Conservatory of Music in 1924.

=== Post-war growth ===
Glenn Gould, one of the conservatory's most notable pupils, studied theory, organ, and piano, graduating at the age of 12 in 1946 with an ARCT diploma of the highest honours.

In 1947, King George VI awarded the conservatory its royal charter in recognition of its status as one of the Commonwealth's greatest music schools. The Toronto Conservatory of Music became The Royal Conservatory of Music.

During Ettore Mazzoleni's term as principal (1945–68), the conservatory grew rapidly. Mazzoleni had been director of the Conservatory Orchestra since 1934. Two other prominent figures who contributed to the achievements of this period were chairman of the board Edward Johnson (who served from 1947 to 1959) and Arnold Walter, who was appointed director of the new Senior School in 1946. The Senior School offered a two-year program with professional performance training combined with related courses in theory and history. The initial success of the project gave rise to a three-year program leading to an Artist Diploma, as well as the conservatory's Opera School (begun in 1946), which provided training in all aspects of opera production. These developments led to the creation of the Royal Conservatory Opera Company, which went on to become the Canadian Opera Company in 1959.

With space now a major problem, the University of Toronto sold the College Street property to Ontario Hydro in 1962 (demolished to make way for the Ontario Power Building in 1975), and the conservatory moved to 273 Bloor Street West, the original site of McMaster University or McMaster Hall as well as Castle Memorial Hall. The concert and recital halls of the College Street site were only partially replaced in the move, and the library, residence, and all three pipe organs were lost.

=== Independent institution ===
The conservatory was governed by the University of Toronto from 1963 until 1991, at which time it became a wholly independent institution again, taking control of its building and diverse music programs. Peter Simon was appointed president of the conservatory.

Also in 1991, the conservatory developed a master plan to renovate its historic building and expand it with the construction of new facilities on the same site. The plan was carried out by Kuwabara Payne McKenna Blumberg Architects (KPMB) in stages, initially with the 1997 renovation of Mazzoleni Concert Hall in the historic Ihnatowycz Hall. The plans for this renovation are held at the Canadian Centre for Architecture in Montreal. The new construction is named the TELUS Centre for Performance and Learning and features academic and performance spaces; the acoustically sound, 1,135-seat Koerner concert venue; studios; classrooms; a new-media centre; a library; and a rehearsal hall. During the renovations, the conservatory temporarily moved to the former location of the Toronto District School Board's Ursula Franklin Academy in the Dufferin and Bloor West area. In September 2008, the conservatory returned to a newly renovated and expanded headquarters at 273 Bloor Street West near Avenue Road. Koerner Hall opened on 25 September 2009, beginning a new age of large-scale performances at The Royal Conservatory.

The original building, McMaster Hall, was renamed Ihnatowycz Hall in 2005, in reference to the contribution of alumni Ian Ihnatowycz and Marta Witer. The designation of this site as a heritage building required that the majority of the original materials and formal qualities be maintained while complying with the building code. The original brickwork was maintained: decorative red brick, Medina sandstone, and polished granite. The imposing manner of the building demonstrates the prominent form of the building.

== Arts education programs ==
The Royal Conservatory is a not-for-profit organization offering a wide range of arts programs.

=== The Royal Conservatory Certificate Program ===
This is the division of The Royal Conservatory that sets and supports standards in music examinations across Canada and internationally. The organization conducts 100,000 examinations annually in over 300 communities around the world.

Examinations are conducted three or four times each year in more than 300 communities through a network of local centres. The Certificate Program encompasses all levels and spans 11 grades: from beginner to certification as an Associate of The Royal Conservatory of Music (ARCT), to certification as a Licentiate of The Royal Conservatory of Music (LRCM).

Achievement on the examinations of The Royal Conservatory is recognized for credit toward secondary school graduation in many school systems in Canada. For most provinces in Canada, a Level 6 Certificate and Level 6 Theory (formerly Intermediate Rudiments) counts as Grade 10 credit, a Level 7 Certificate and Level 6 or Level 7 Theory (also formerly Intermediate Rudiments) counts as Grade 11 credit, and a Level 8 Certificate and Level 8 Theory (formerly Advanced Rudiments) counts as Grade 12 credit. One's standing in the Certificate Program also plays an important role in entrance requirements for professional music programs at many universities and colleges.

=== The Royal Conservatory Music Development Program ===
In 2011 The Royal Conservatory partnered with Carnegie Hall to launch The Achievement Program in the United States. In January 2013 The Royal Conservatory took on sole responsibility of the successful program under the name The Royal Conservatory Music Development Program. Developed to provide a national standard for all learners, in 2016 The Music Development Program was merged with The RCM Certificate Program.

=== The Frederick Harris Music Co., Limited ===
The Frederick Harris Music Co. Limited, is the oldest and largest print-music publisher in Canada.

Frederick Harris (1866–1945) devoted his life to music publishing. He began his career in England working for a large music publishing firm. In 1904, he set up his own business in London and in 1910, established a Canadian office in Toronto – marking the beginning of a long association with The Royal Conservatory that led to an increased emphasis on publications for teaching and learning. In 1944, the company was donated to the conservatory with profits to be used for its own purposes.

=== The Glenn Gould School ===
The Glenn Gould School would become a centre for professional training in classical music performance at the postsecondary and postbachelor levels, The School was established in 1987. Originally called The Royal Conservatory of Music Professional School, it was renamed in 1997 to honour Glenn Gould, the Toronto-born piano virtuoso and a former pupil. Enrollment is limited to 130, and The School is supported by funding from the Department of Canadian Heritage through the National Arts Contribution Program. It has become one of the most highly respected music conservatories in North America, and the world.

The faculty consists of internationally acclaimed performers, teachers, and scholars. More than 125 master classes are presented each year with artists, such as, Stewart Goodyear, Anton Kuerti, and James Ehnes.

Glenn Gould School alumni have established careers as solo performers, orchestral musicians, chamber musicians, and recording artists. Alumni include the pianist Jan Lisiecki, singers Isabel Bayrakdarian and Robert Gleadow, the pianists David Jalbert and Richard Raymond, the harpist Mariko Anraku, the violist Adam Romer, as well as the St. Lawrence String Quartet.

The Glenn Gould School offers an accredited four-year Bachelor of Music (Honours) degree in Music Performance in piano, voice, and all orchestral instruments, designed for high school graduates who wish to prepare for a career as a performer. The Artist Diploma is a two-year postbachelor program for piano, voice, orchestral instruments, performance, and pedagogy. The school also offers The Rebanks Family Fellowship and Performance Diploma Program, a one-year career development program for aspiring classical musicians.

=== The Phil and Eli Taylor Performance Academy for Young Artists ===
After competitive video and live auditions, accepted students are streamed into Junior or Senior Academy programs. This comprehensive program develops performance skills, musicianship, and academic excellence. Most Academy activities take place on Friday evenings and Saturdays but students are expected to practice daily and work on regular assignments. Through the support of private individuals and foundations, financial assistance is available for all students. Alumni of the academy who have launched successful careers include Peter Simon, Katie Stillman, Eugene Nakamura, Marcin Swoboda, Janice LaMarre, Marta and Irena Kretchkovsky, and Karen Ouzounian.

=== Royal Conservatory School ===
The Royal Conservatory School offers individual and group instruction in classical, popular, folk, jazz, and world music, to people of all ages and abilities. The school also offers music appreciation sessions as well as training programs for teachers and artists.

=== The Marilyn Thomson Early Childhood Education Centre ===
In October 2013 The Royal Conservatory launched The Marilyn Thomson Early Childhood Education Centre, with an aim of spreading online learning in music to young children.

=== Exchange Program ===
The Royal Conservatory of Music's Glenn Gould School has joined the exchange program with different prestigious music institutions across the world. The exchange institutions include:

- Conservatoire National Supérieur de Musique et de Danse de Paris, France;
- Shanghai Conservatory of Music, China;
- Sibelius Academy of the University of the Arts Helsinki, Finland;
- Hochschule für Musik Hanns Eisler Berlin, Germany;
- The Hong Kong Academy for Performing Arts, Hong Kong;
- Sydney Conservatorium of Music, Australia;
- Reina Sofía School of Music Munich, Germany;
- Reina Sofía School of Music, Madrid Spain;
- Tokyo University of the Arts, Faculty of Music, and Graduate School of Music, Japan;
- London's Royal Academy of Music, England.

== Performing arts ==
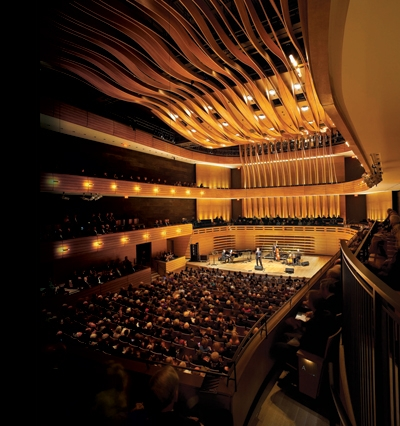
Koerner Hall, which opened in 2009

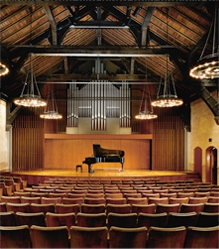
Mazzoleni Concert Hall

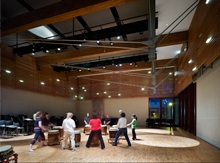
Temerty Theatre

The Royal Conservatory presents approximately 100 performances a year, featuring classical, jazz, world, and pop music artists from around the world. It has three concert venues: Koerner Hall, Mazzoleni Concert Hall, and Temerty Theatre.

=== Koerner Hall ===
Named for donors Michael and Sonja Koerner, Koerner Hall opened in September 2009 and houses 1,135 seats. It was designed by KPMB Architects, under the direction of Marianne McKenna, theatre consultant Anne Minors Performance Consultants, and acoustics company Sound Space Design. It features two balcony tiers above the main orchestra level as well as a third technical balcony. Koerner Hall's signature element is an acoustically transparent veil of twisting oak strings that forms the backdrop for the chorus at the first balcony level, then hovers over the stage below the fixed acoustic canopy, extending into and over the hall at the technical balcony level. Completion of the project also includes three tiers of glass fronted lobbies overlooking Philosopher's Walk, back-of-house areas for performers, a ground-floor café, and installation of a unique collection of antique musical instruments donated by the Koerner family and valued at $1 million. Each level is also equipped to host a variety of private functions.

=== Mazzoleni Concert Hall ===
Mazzoleni Concert Hall has 6,000 square feet (560 m^{2}) and 237 seats. When it opened in 1901, it was known as Castle Memorial Hall. At that time it had a chapel with stained glass windows on the ground floor level and a library on the lower level. By the 1960s, the University of Toronto, which used the space as a lecture hall, had bricked up the windows and removed a rear balcony. In 1996, restoration began. Mazzoleni Concert Hall was named in honour of Ettore Mazzoleni, a former principal of the conservatory.

=== Temerty Theatre ===
"A granite cube which floats above Bloor Street," this multipurpose performance and event space is located on level two of the TELUS Centre for Performance and Learning. It has space for up to 150 seats and is designed to accommodate a range of functions, including special events, performance, rehearsals, and "Learning Through the Arts™" activities. In scale and proportion, the Conservatory Theatre replicates the acoustic quality and stage size of Koerner Hall to prepare students for live performance. The venue is named in honour of James and Louise Temerty.

== ARC Ensemble ==
Established in 2002, the ARC Ensemble (Artists of The Royal Conservatory) is composed of senior faculty members of the conservatory's Glenn Gould School in Toronto and led by artistic director Simon Wynberg.

The ensemble has been nominated for three Grammy Awards. Its current album, dedicated to the works of Polish-American composer Jerzy Fitelberg, was nominated in the categories of Best Chamber Music Performance and Producer of the Year, Classical (David Frost). The ensemble has also received Grammy nominations for its 2007 recording On the Threshold of Hope, and its 2008 album Right Through The Bone, devoted to the music of German-Dutch composer Julius Röntgen.

=== Current membership ===
- Marie Bérard, violin
- Benjamin Bowman, violin
- Steven Dann, viola
- Bryan Epperson, cello
- David Louie, piano
- Erika Raum, violin
- Joaquin Valdepeñas, clarinet
- Dianne Werner, piano

== Alumni ==
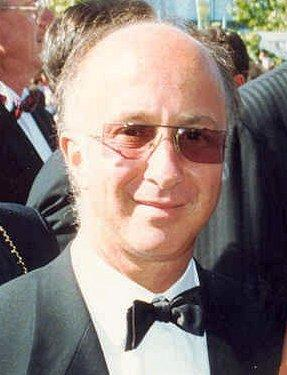
Paul Shaffer

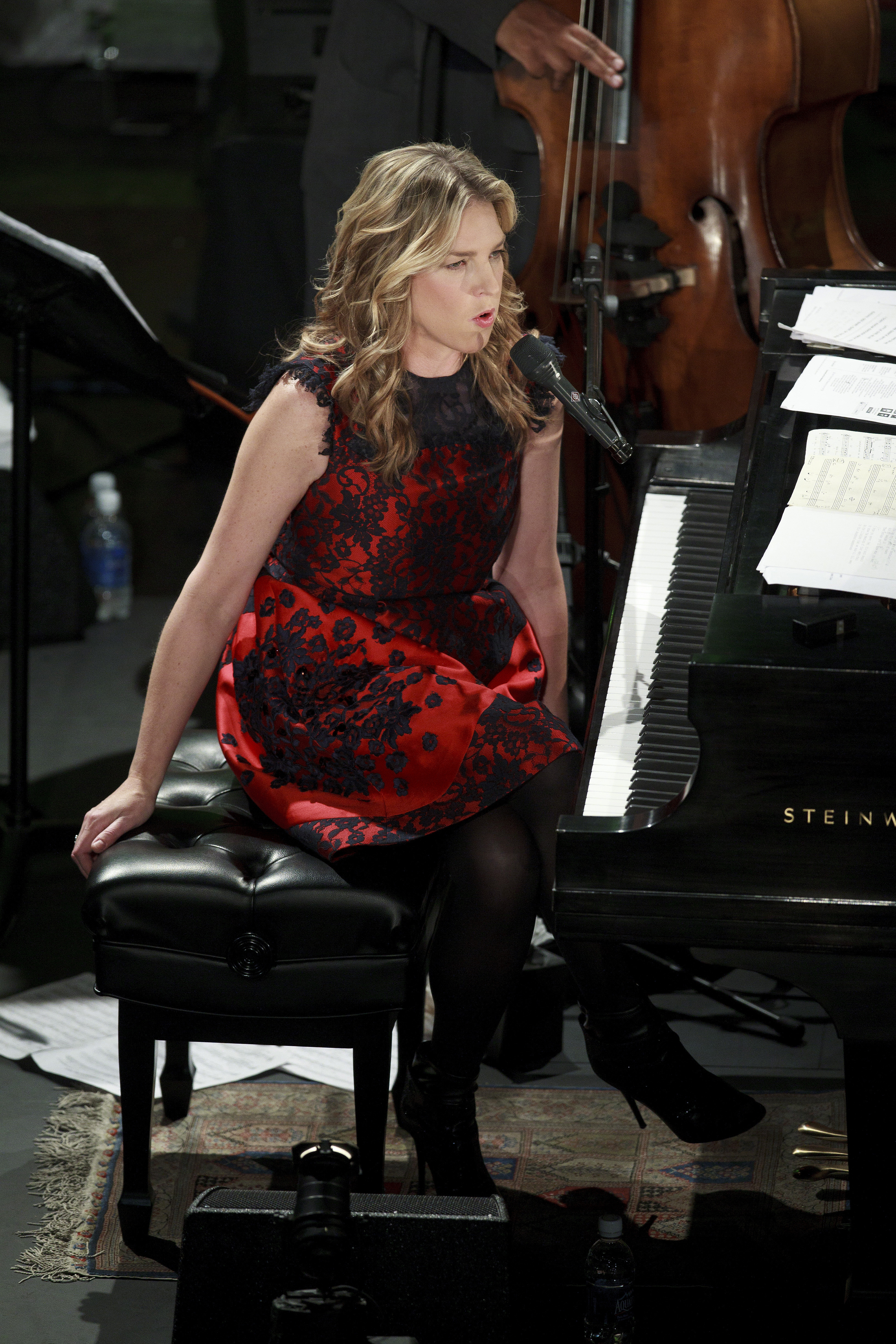
Diana Krall

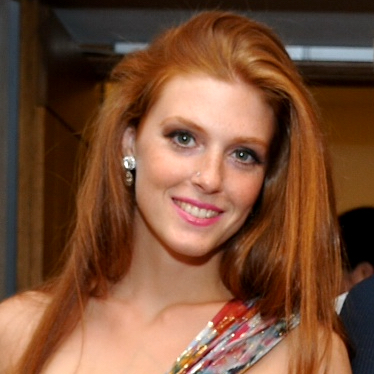
Wallis Giunta

Oscar Peterson

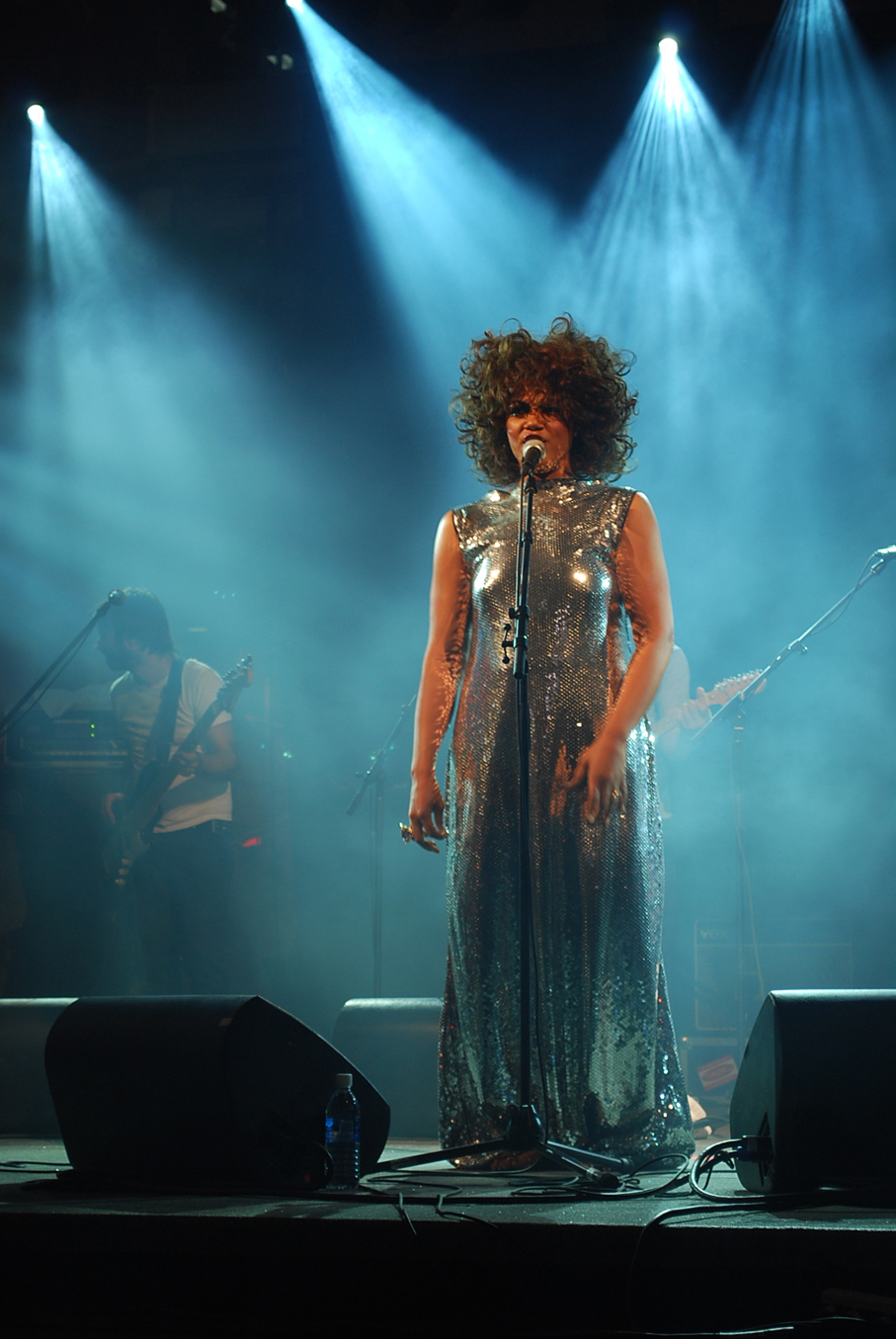
Measha Brueggergosman

=== Actors ===
- Kim Cattrall, actor
- Sandra Oh, award-winning actress
- Gordon Pinsent, actor
- Sarah Polley, actress and filmmaker
- Ryan Reynolds, actor
- Kim Schraner, actress

=== Artists ===
- Millie Chen, artist
- Shari Kasman, multidisciplinary artist
- Christopher O'Hoski, painter

=== Athletes ===
- Sean Morley, wrestler
- Scott Niedermayer, hockey player
- Eric Radford, world champion pairs figure skater

=== Brass players ===
- Guido Basso, trumpeter
- Scott Irvine, tuba player, composer, and arranger
- Jens Lindemann, trumpeter
- Kenny Wheeler, trumpeter, flugelhorn player, and composer

=== Composers ===
- Murray Adaskin, composer, violinist, and conductor
- Samuel Andreyev, composer, singer-songwriter, and poet
- Louis Applebaum, composer and conductor
- John Arpin, composer and recording artist
- Milton Barnes, composer, conductor, and percussionist
- John Beckwith, composer and pianist
- Norma Beecroft, composer and arts administrator
- Patricia Blomfield Holt, composer and pianist
- Stephen Brown, composer
- Cos Natola, pianist, vocalist, composer
- Walter Buczynski, composer and pianist
- John Burge, composer and pianist
- Howard Cable, composer and conductor
- Jimmy Dale, composer, arranger, pianist, and organist
- Hugh Davidson, composer and music critic
- Bill Douglas, composer, pianist, and bassoonist
- Anne Eggleston, composer
- John Estacio, composer
- Robert Fleming, composer, organist, pianist, and choirmaster
- Clifford Ford, composer
- David Foster, composer, musician, and producer
- Harry Freedman, composer and English hornist
- George Gao, composer and erhu player
- Eric Genuis, composer and pianist
- Jim Hiscott, composer, radio producer, and accordionist
- Dorothy James, composer and music educator
- Veronika Krausas, composer
- Gary Kulesha, composer, pianist, conductor, and educator
- Alexina Louie, composer, pianist
- Bruce Mather, composer and pianist
- Boyd McDonald, composer and pianist
- Diana McIntosh, composer and pianist
- Ben McPeek, composer, arranger, conductor, and pianist
- John Mills-Cockell, composer and multi-instrumentalist
- Phil Nimmons, composer and educator
- Allan Rae, composer, conductor, and trumpeter
- Imant Raminsh, composer of choral music
- Eldon Rathburn, composer of film scores
- Sylvia Rickard, composer and pianist
- Doug Riley, composer and pianist
- John Robertson, composer
- Clark Ross, composer, guitarist, and music educator
- Welford Russell, composer of choral music
- R. Murray Schafer, composer, environmentalist, and educator
- Ben Steinberg, composer, pianist, organist, and conductor
- Greg Wells, Grammy winning musician, composer, record producer

=== Conductors ===
- John Avison, conductor and pianist
- Jean Ashworth Bartle, choral conductor
- Mario Bernardi, conductor
- John Cozens, choral conductor
- George Crum, conductor
- Victor Feldbrill, conductor and violinist
- Hans Gruber, conductor
- George Hurst, conductor
- Julian Kuerti, conductor
- Gary Kulesha, conductor, composer, and faculty at the University of Toronto, Faculty of Music
- Geoffrey Moull, conductor and pianist
- Kent Nagano, conductor and music director
- Roger Norrington, conductor
- Ivan Romanoff, conductor, violinist, arranger, and composer
- Paul Shaffer, musical director
- Alfred Strombergs, conductor and pianist

=== Journalists and media personalities ===
- Jeanne Beker, television personality
- Piya Chattopadhyay, broadcaster and journalist
- Ivan Fecan, media executive
- Heather Hiscox, journalist and broadcaster
- George Stroumboulopoulos, broadcaster

=== Musicologists ===
- Maria Rika Maniates, musicologist
- Kenneth Peacock, ethnomusicologist, composer, and pianist
- Malcolm Troup, musicologist, pianist, and educator

=== Organists ===
- Lorne Betts, organist, composer, conductor, and educator
- W. H. Hewlett, organist, conductor, and composer
- Walter MacNutt, organist, choir director, and composer
- Roman Toi, organist, choir conductor, and composer

=== Percussionists ===
- Brent Fitz, rock drummer
- Gordon Slater, carillonneur

=== Pianists ===
- Reginald Bedford, pianist
- Richard Bell, pianist
- Howard Brown, pianist and harpsichordist
- Naida Cole, pianist
- Ron Davis, jazz pianist
- Chilly Gonzales, Grammy Award-winning pianist, songwriter, and producer
- Glenn Gould, pianist
- Lawrence Gowan, pianist
- Stuart Hamilton, pianist, vocal coach, radio broadcaster, artistic director, and producer
- Sheila Henig, pianist and soprano
- Angela Hewitt, pianist
- Margaret Ann Ireland, pianist
- Jon Kimura Parker, pianist and educator
- Robert, now Bobbi Lancaster, pianist cum medical doctor and professional golfer
- Jan Lisiecki, pianist
- Oscar Peterson, pianist and composer
- Christina Petrowska-Quilico, pianist
- Richard Raymond, pianist
- Doug Riley, jazz pianist
- Nahre Sol, pianist and composer
- Ruth Watson Henderson, pianist and composer
- Naomi Yanova, pianist, music critic, and educator

=== Record Producers ===
- Bob Ezrin, record producer
- Gene Martynec, record producer, guitarist, keyboardist, and composer

=== Singers ===
==== Jazz ====
- Emilie-Claire Barlow, jazz singer and musician
- Diana Krall, singer and pianist
- Daniela Nardi, singer and songwriter
- Gloria Reuben, Jazz singer and actress

==== Musical theatre ====
- Robert Goulet, singer and actor

==== Opera and classical ====
- Isabel Bayrakdarian, soprano
- Mary Bothwell, classical vocalist
- Russell Braun, baritone
- Measha Brueggergosman, soprano
- Wallis Giunta, mezzo-soprano
- Leslie Holmes, baritone and voice teacher
- Doreen Hume, soprano
- Frances James, soprano
- Miriam Khalil, soprano
- Gilles Lamontagne, baritone
- Lois Marshall, soprano
- James Milligan, opera and concert singer
- David Mills, bass
- Maria Pellegrini, soprano
- Adrianne Pieczonka, soprano
- Catherine Robbin, mezzo-soprano
- Louise Roy, soprano
- Edythe Shuttleworth, mezzo-soprano
- Teresa Stratas, soprano
- Joyce Sullivan, mezzo-soprano and radio and television host
- Heather Thomson, soprano
- Jon Vickers, tenor
- Portia White, contralto
- Alan Woodrow, tenor
- Gordon Wry, tenor and conductor

==== Popular ====
- Jane Child, singer
- Lawrence Gowan, singer and keyboardist
- Gisele MacKenzie, singer and actress
- Kate Rogers, singer
- Dave Somerville, singer
- Shania Twain, singer

==== Singer-songwriter ====
- Annie Mottram Craig Batten (1883-1964), soprano, vocal instructor, and composer
- Laila Biali, singer-songwriter and pianist
- Bruce Cockburn, singer-songwriter and guitarist
- Emily Haines, singer-songwriter
- Carly Rae Jepsen, singer-songwriter
- Kiesza, singer-songwriter and multi-instrumentalist
- Carolyn Dawn Johnson, singer-songwriter
- Chantal Kreviazuk, singer-songwriter and pianist
- Gordon Lightfoot, singer-songwriter
- Scott MacIntyre, singer-songwriter and pianist
- Amanda Marshall, singer-songwriter
- Loreena McKennitt, singer-songwriter, pianist and composer
- Sarah McLachlan, singer/songwriter
- Kalan Porter, singer-songwriter
- Tegan and Sara Quin, singer-songwriters and pianists
- Mia Sheard, singer-songwriter
- Sarah Slean, singer-songwriter

=== Politicians and civil servants ===
- Rosalie Abella, judge
- The Rt. Hon. Kim Campbell, 19th Prime Minister of Canada
- Rt. Hon Stephen Harper 22nd Prime Minister of Canada
- The Hon. Barbara McDougall, former Secretary of State for External Affairs
- The Hon. Bob Rae, former premier of Ontario
- Mitchell Sharp, Canadian former Minister of Finance
- Joy Smith, politician

=== String players ===
- Randy Bachman, guitarist
- Soo Bae, cellist
- Rob Baker, guitarist
- Martin Beaver, violinist
- Lloyd Blackman, violinist, conductor, composer, and educator
- Jonathan Crow, violinist, concert master
- Jeremy Findlay, cellist
- Betty-Jean Hagen, violinist
- Jeff Healey, guitarist
- Susanne Hou, violinist
- Eli Kassner, guitar teacher
- Norbert Kraft, classical guitarist
- Joseph Pach, violinist
- Owen Pallett, violinist and composer
- Richard Reed Parry, guitarist and composer
- Ryan Peake, guitarist
- Blake Pouliot, violinist
- Erika Raum, violinist
- Wyatt Ruther, jazz double-bassist
- Steven Staryk, violinist
- Rudy Toth, cimbalom player, composer, arranger, and conductor

=== Woodwind players ===
- Lawrence Cherney, oboist
- Moe Koffman, saxophonist, flautist, composer and arranger
- Ron Korb, flautist
- Phil Nimmons, clarinetist, composer, and bandleader
- Norman Symonds, clarinetist, saxophonist, and composer
- Jerry Toth, saxophonist, clarinetist, flautist, composer, arranger, and record producer

=== Writers ===
- Stuart Broomer, music critic, writer on music, editor, pianist and composer
- Muriel Denison, writer
- Barbara Gowdy, novelist, short-story writer
- Ann-Marie MacDonald, author

=== Other ===
- Aline Chrétien, academic administrator
- Irving Guttman, stage director
- Anna-Marie Holmes, ballet dancer and choreographer
- Norman Jewison, film director
- Veronica Tennant, filmmaker and former Prima Ballerina, National Ballet of Canada

== Teachers ==
Notable teachers at The Royal Conservatory include:

- Joan Barrett violin teacher
- Boris Berlin, pianist, arranger, and composer
- Leon Fleisher, pianist and conductor
- Arthur Friedheim, pianist, conductor and composer (Canadian Academy of Music)
- Nicholas Goldschmidt, first music director of conservatory's Opera School (1946-1957)
- Alberto Guerrero, teacher (1922-1959)
- Paul Kantor, violin teacher
- Luigi von Kunits, conductor
- Joseph Macerollo, free bass accordion teacher (1969-1985)
- Ernest MacMillan, principal (appointed 1926)
- Boyd Neel, dean of the conservatory, 1953–1971
- Laura de Turczynowicz (1878–1953), former opera singer and head of the Royal Conservatory Opera Company 1926–1928
- Frank Welsman, conductor, pianist, composer and music educator
- Healey Willan, appointed head of the theory department in 1913, vice-principal, 1920–1936

== Honorary Fellows of The Royal Conservatory ==
An Honorary Fellowship is the highest honour awarded by The Royal Conservatory. It is presented to outstanding Canadian and international artists and individuals who have made significant contributions to arts and culture in Canada and around the world.

- 1990: John Kruspe, musician and lecturer
- 1990: Norman Burgess, musician, educator, administrator
- 1991: Gordon Kushner, pianist, conductor, and teacher
- 1992: William Littler, educator and music and dance critic at the Toronto Star
- 1993: Robert Goulet
- 1993: J Anthony Dawson, organist, composer, and teacher at The Royal Conservatory
- 1993: Adrienne Clarkson, journalist and stateswoman
- 1994: Lois Marshall, soprano and mezzo-soprano
- 1994: Robertson Davies, author
- 1995: David Mirvish, art collector and dealer
- 1995: Maureen Forrester, operatic contralto who gave master classes at the conservatory
- 1996: Mario Bernardi, conductor and pianist
- 1997: Lorand Fenyves, violin teacher
- 1997: Doreen Hall, violinist, teacher to the conservatory
- 1998: Jeanne Lamon, violinist and conductor
- 1998: Tomson Highway, writer
- 1999: Teresa Stratas, soprano
- 1999: Marina Geringas, publisher at the conservatory
- 1999: Alan Goddard, former director of The Royal Conservatory of Music
- 2000: Edith Lantos, educator
- 2000: Leon Fleisher, pianist and conductor
- 2000: Aline Chrétien
- 2001: Richard Bradshaw, conductor
- 2001: Oscar Peterson, pianist
- 2002: Eugene Kash, violinist, conductor, and teacher
- 2002: David Foster, producer, songwriter, and composer
- 2003: Richard Margison, operatic tenor
- 2003: Bruce Cockburn, singer/songwriter
- 2004: Isabel Bayrakdarian, soprano
- 2004: Barenaked Ladies, rock band
- 2005: Louise Pitre, actress
- 2005: Bramwell Tovey, conductor and composer
- 2006: The Tragically Hip, rock band
- 2007: Erica Davidson, ballet dancer
- 2007: Marta Witer, optometrist
- 2007: Ian O. Ihnatowycz, investor
- 2007: Blue Rodeo, pop and country band
- 2008: John Perry, pianist
- 2008: Steven Staryk, violinist
- 2008: R. Murray Schafer, composer, writer, educator
- 2008: Nelly Furtado, singer/songwriter
- 2010: Darren Entwistle, businessman
- 2011: Jeanne Lougheed and Peter Lougheed, philanthropist and Premier of Alberta
- 2011: Jens Lindemann, trumpeter
- 2011: June Goldsmith, artistic director
- 2011: Phil Nimmons, composer and educator
- 2011: Marianne McKenna, founding partner, KPMB Architects
- 2012: Henry Lee, business leader and philanthropist
- 2012: Joseph Elworthy, arts administrator
- 2012: Stephen McHolm, arts administrator
- 2012: Martin Beaver, violinist
- 2012: Judy Loman, harpist
- 2012: Gerald Stanick, violist, teacher, and arts administrator
- 2012: Measha Brueggergosman, soprano
- 2012: Feist, singer/songwriter
- 2013: Jeremiah Brown, Olympic medallist
- 2013: Dr. Stephen Toope, scholar and administrator
- 2013: Victor Feldbrill, conductor
- 2013: The Hon. Tommy Banks, pianist, composer, television personality, and former senator
- 2013: Doc Severinsen, jazz and pop trumpeter
- 2013: Bob Ezrin, music producer
- 2013: Adrianne Pieczonka, soprano
- 2013: Randy Bachman, guitarist
- 2014: Andrew Markow, music teacher
- 2014: Paul Dornian, arts administrator and music teacher
- 2014: Jean MacPhail, music teacher
- 2014: Phil and Eli Taylor, philanthropists
- 2014: Sir Andrew Davis, conductor
- 2014: Ron Sexsmith, singer/songwriter
- 2015: Bill van der Sloot, music teacher
- 2015: Kathryn Walker, arts administrator
- 2015: Tania Miller, conductor
- 2015: Mary Morrison, soprano and music teacher
- 2015: Chris Hadfield, astronaut
- 2015: Mario Romano, philanthropist
- 2015: James Ehnes, violinist
- 2015: Buffy Sainte-Marie, singer/songwriter
- 2016: Michael Foulkes
- 2016: Chantal Kreviazuk, singer/songwriter
- 2016: W. Garfield Weston Foundation
- 2016: Jon Kimura Parker, pianist
- 2016: k.d. lang, singer/songwriter
- 2016: Lang Lang, pianist
- 2017:Russell Braun, baritone
- 2017: Ben Heppner, tenor
- 2017: Henry Hung, philanthropist
- 2017: Burton Cummings, singer/songwriter
- 2018: Denise Ball, journalist and producer
- 2018: Robbie Robertson, singer/songwriter
- 2018: Sondra Radvanovsky, soprano
- 2018: Tim and Frances Price, philanthropists
- 2018: Linda Niamath, music educator
- 2019: Lighthouse, rock band
- 2019: Anagnoson & Kinton, piano duo
- 2019: BMO Financial Group, philanthropy
- 2019: Stephen Chatman, composer
- 2019: Eric Radford, figure skater
- 2020: Stewart Goodyear, pianist
- 2022: Anthony Flynn,
- 2022: Chantal Kreviazuk, singer/songwriter and composer
- 2022: Bill and Janet L'Heureux, philanthropists
- 2022: Peter Oundjian, conductor
- 2023: Jordan de Souza, conductor
- 2023: Ryan de Souza, music director
- 2023: Edward Han Jiang, pianist and composer
- 2023: Eugene Levy, actor
- 2023: Jackie Richardson, singer and actress
- 2023: Terence Tam, violinist and concertmaster
- 2023: James and Louise Temerty, philanthropists
- 2024: Dr. Jeremy Eichler, music critic, historian and author
- 2024: Angela Elster, arts leader
- 2024: Elaine Rusk, pianist and music teacher
- 2024: Yanick Nézet-Séguin, pianist and conductor
- 2025: Adrian Anantawan, violinist
- 2025: Rayla Myhal, philanthropist
- 2025: Rufus Wainwright, singer/songwriter
- 2025: Renee Fleming, soprano and actress
- 2026: Dr. Corey Hamm, pianist and music teacher
- 2026: Kevin Chen, pianist
- 2026: Loie Fallis, arts leader
- 2026: Jen and Steve McDonald, philanthropists

== See also ==
- List of Canadian organizations with royal patronage
- List of oldest buildings and structures in Toronto
- Music of Canada
- Music of Ontario
- The Prince's Charities
