= Toronto Children's Chorus =

Children's choir in Toronto, Canada

The Toronto Children's Chorus (TCC) is a leading Canadian children's choir based in Toronto. It was founded in 1978 by Jean Ashworth Bartle. The group has close to 350 members aged 6 to 18.

== History ==
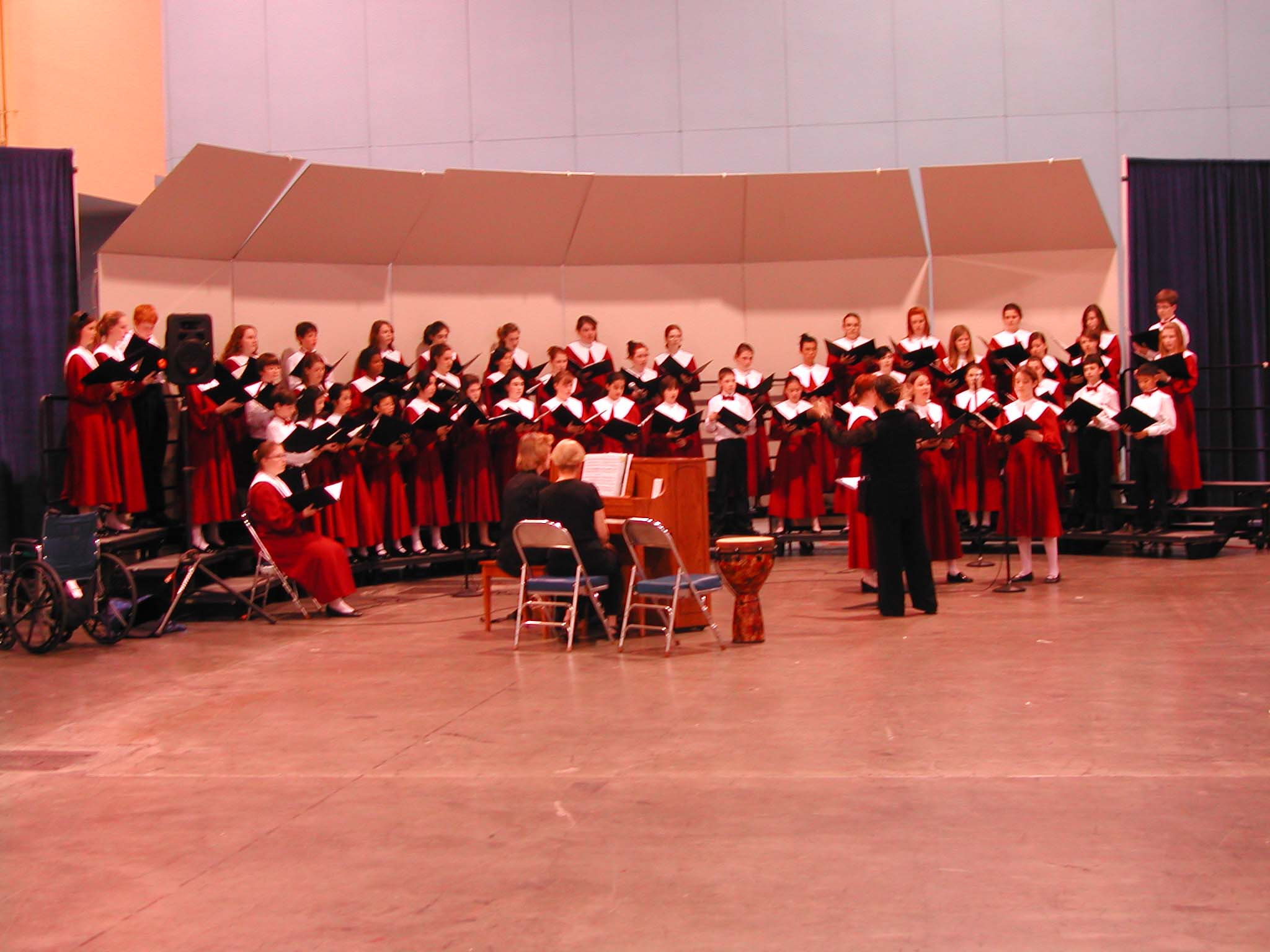
The TCC performing in Miami at the American Choral Directors Association convention

In 1982, the choir won first prize at the International Eisteddfod in Wales. Other awards followed including first place in the prestigious Let the Peoples Sing Competition in 1993 and numerous 1st places in the CBC choral competition.

The Toronto Children's Chorus has performed at Carnegie Hall (1994, 2016, 2023), the Kennedy Center (1995), the Kimmel Center (2002), Royal Albert Hall (2002), Sydney Opera House (1999, 2019), Salzburg Cathedral (2006) and Stephansdom (2006). The Chorus was also honoured to serve as Artist-in-Residence for international children's choir festivals in Tuscany, Italy (1995) and Sydney, Australia (1999).

In August 2007, Elise Bradley, MNMZ, a New Zealand conductor and teacher previously based in Auckland, became the new Artistic Director of the organization.

In July 2022, Zimfira Poloz became the organization's new Artistic Director.

== Choir structure ==
The TCC consists of nine choirs total: five Training Choirs (Miro, Spirito, Pasio, Anima, and Coro), the Main Choir (Cantare, Chorealis, and Chamber), and the Toronto Youth Choir for singers aged 14–30 (sopranos/altos 18+ and tenors/basses 14+). Children as young as 6 can audition for Spirito, and typically move up in the training choir levels over several years until they reach the Main Choir.

The Chamber choir is the TCC's representative choir, composed of choristers with advanced musical and performance skills. Chamber represents the TCC and Toronto both nationally and internationally, performs in guest appearances, and embarks on tours. Within Chamber is a subset group, the Choral Scholars, who are the pinnacle of music ability in the choir structure, and demonstrate exceptional musical excellence and leadership. Choral scholars are typically the first choristers considered for solos, high-profile engagements, and specialized performances.

In 2012, the Toronto Youth Choir was founded with the intention of providing an ensemble for choristers who have graduated out of the Main Choir, including tenors and basses whose voices may have dropped as early as age fourteen and no longer can perform in a treble choir. In the 2019/20 season, the TYC had 65 choristers aged 16 to 30.

Additionally, the TCC runs the KinderNotes program, a weekly early years music education class for Junior Kindergarten and Senior Kindergarten aged children. TCC's KinderNotes classes feature singing, movement, music reading, rhythmic skills, improvisation, and listening games.

== Tours ==
- 2027 - Newfoundland
- 2026 - Hong Kong and Singapore
- 2025 - International Choral Kathimaxiw Festival, British Columbia
- 2024 - Slovenia
- 2023 – Washington, D.C., and New York City
- 2019 – New Zealand and Australia
- 2018 – New York (Toronto Youth Choir), Newfoundland
- 2017 – Spain and the 11th World Symposium on Choral Music in Barcelona
- 2016 – Boston and New York City - Carnegie Hall
- 2015 – Russia, Estonia, Latvia, Lithuania, Poland
- 2014 – Podium 2014 in Halifax, Canada
- 2013 – Ihlombe South Africa Choral Festival in Cape Town, South Africa
- 2013 – Montreal and Ottawa - Soundstreams and the Fujii Ensemble
- 2012 – Podium 2012 in Ottawa, Canada
- 2012 – Adolf Fredrik Music School's international "Let the Future Sing" festival in Stockholm, Sweden
- 2011 – 9th World Symposium on Choral Music in Puerto Madryn, Argentina
- 2011 – Melodia Festival in Rio de Janeiro, Brazil and Buenos Aires, Argentina
- 2009 – Austria, Czech Republic, Germany
- 2006 – New York State
- 2006 – Hungary, Slovakia, Austria

== Recordings ==
- Dancing Day (1992)
- Mostly Britten (1993)
- Come Ye Makers of Song (2000)
- My Heart Soars (2004)
- Songs of the Lights (2005)
- How Sweet the Sound (2006)
- A Song for All Seasons (2007)
- A Ceremony of Carols (2009)
- Sounzscapes from Our Lands (2013)

== Conductors ==
- 1978 to 2007 Jean Ashworth Bartle
- 2007 to 2021 Elise Bradley
- 2022 Matthew Otto (interim)
- 2022 to Present Zimfira Poloz
