= Leslie Holmes =

Canadian opera singer (1901–1960)

Leslie Holmes (April 30, 1901 – March 20, 1983) was a Canadian baritone and voice teacher. While known by his birth name as a performer in Canada, to avoid confusion with Leslie Holmes of the Two Leslies he adopted the stage name of Laurence Holmes (sometimes spelled Lawrence Holmes) in England in 1932. He was a celebrated singer in oratorios, concerts, and recitals in Canada and England from the 1920s–1950s. He appeared as a soloist with several notable music ensembles during his career, including the London Symphony Orchestra, the BBC Symphony Orchestra, the Montreal Orchestra, and the Toronto Symphony Orchestra. He was also a soloist at the Montreal Festivals. He was a professor of singing at The Royal Conservatory of Music in Toronto (1945–1946, and 1954–1960), the Royal Academy of Music in London (1947–1954), and the Royal Hamilton College of Music (1964–1969).

== Early life and education in Canada ==
Leslie George Holmes was born at Lesser Slave Lake in Alberta on April 30, 1901. He had four older siblings, Frances, Edith, Amy, and Howard. His English-born father, George Holmes, came to Canada at a young age and was first bishop of Moosonee, and later bishop of Athabasca. His father died on February 4, 1912, while visiting London, England, when Leslie was ten years old. His father had traveled to London to visit his children whom he had sent abroad to boarding school. His mother, Eliza Holmes, died almost ten years later in Toronto on September 21, 1921.

Holmes studied singing at the Canadian Academy of Music with Albert Ham. While Ham's pupil he became a resident singer at St. Augustine's Church in Toronto in 1921. By April 1922 he was employed in the same capacity at St. Luke's Church, Toronto. The following month he performed with several of Ham's other pupils in a concert at Massey Hall in which he sang the role of the witch in Matthew Locke's musical setting of Shakespeare's Macbeth. The following October he sang two songs on CFCA radio program The Star. He continued to perform as a soloist on CFCA radio programs in 1923, and also sang that year at St. Augustine's.

On March 4, 1924, Holmes made his recital debut at the Hart House Theatre. At that time he was working as the resident bass at St. Paul's, Bloor Street. By the 1924–1925 academic year he was pursuing further studies in voice at the Toronto Conservatory (TC) where he was a singing pupil of M. M. Stevenson. In October 1925 he sang the premiere of several art songs ("Throughout the Night", "Love's Thief", "Song of the Trees", etc.) by T. J. Crawford in a program given at the TC. He gave voice recitals at the TC in February 1925, September 1929, and October 1938.

== Studies in England and early concert career ==
By October 1925 Holmes had left Canada and was in England studying singing. He studied in London with Harry Plunket Greene at the Royal College of Music. He later spent time studying in Austria in 1929, and with Reinhold von Warlich in Germany in 1930. He also spent time in Paris as a voice student of Claire Croiza.

In December 1926 Holmes sang at a benefit concert sponsored by David Beatty, 1st Earl Beatty, at Mall House in which he shared billing with Nellie Melba. The concert was attended by Princess Beatrice, Princess Helena, and Princess Marie Louise among other high society members. In March 1927 he performed at a private concert given in the home of Sir Arthur Steel-Maitland with several prominent members of the Cabinet of the United Kingdom and their wives in attendance.

On April 29, 1927, Holmes gave his London recital debut at Grotrian Hall; later returning there for a series of three recitals in 1929. In the summer of 1927 he sang on British radio as a member of the Daventry Quartet, and as a soloist with pianist Raie da Costa and the Wireless Orchestra under conductor John Ansell. In October 1927 he was a soloist in a chamber music concert given at the Victoria and Albert Museum by the League of Arts with Reginald Goodall as his accompanist. In March 1928 he gave a recital at Wigmore Hall; later returning there for further recitals in 1931, 1934, 1937, and 1938. In the summer of 1928 he gave a recital at the Salzburg Festival. After this he performed with the Leeds Philharmonic Society.

In February 1929 Holmes performed a benefit concert with tenor Frank Mullings and pianist and composer Edward Isaacs (who organized the event) at Houldsworth Hall to raise funds for the National Library for the Blind. On Palm Sunday 1929 he performed the role of Christus in Bach's St Matthew Passion at York Minster cathedral, a part which he repeated internationally and became widely known for. In May 1929 he sang the role of the Painter Monk in a BBC radio broadcast of Jules Massenet's opera Le jongleur de Notre-Dame with conductor Percy Pitt and tenor Frank Titterton in the title role. In December 1929 he performed at a dinner organized by Secretary of State Sidney Webb for the staffs of the Dominion Affairs Office and Colonial Office.

On October 1, 1929, he married Ruth Marion, the daughter of canon A. P. Shatford at St. James the Apostle Anglican Church, Montreal. The marriage ended almost a year later when Ruth suddenly died in London in September 1930. The previous May he gave a recital at Aeolian Hall, London. He returned to Eastern Canada to give recitals in 1930, 1931, and 1933. In January 1931 he performed a concert of Handel arias, and songs by Schumann and Mendelssohn with the Toronto Symphony Orchestra and conductor Luigi von Kunits which was recorded for broadcast on CNR Radio.

By March 1931 Holmes was back in England where he appeared as a soloist in Beethoven's Symphony No. 9 with the Hallé Orchestra led by Hamilton Harty. He soon after appeared as the baritone soloist in Bach's St Matthew Passion in performances at both the Lincoln Cathedral and Leeds Cathedral. In June 1931 he performed a recital broadcast on BBC Radio with Ania Dorfmann as his accompanist. The following month he returned to Wigmore Hall to perform with fellow Canadian singers Jeanne Dusseau and Sarah Fischer in a "Canadian Concert" sponsored by Prince Albert, Duke of York (later King George VI). In September 1931 he performed as a soloist at the BBC Proms with Henry Wood leading the BBC Symphony Orchestra at Queen's Hall.

In early 1932 Holmes gave recitals at Victoria Hall, Westmount, and Leighton House. In February 1932 he appeared in Bach's St Matthew Passion again at Central Hall Westminster, and the following month he was a soloist in both Haydn's The Creation and Mendelssohn's Hymn of Praise with the Gloucester Choral Society with conductor Herbert Sumsion. He was also a soloist in Bach's St John Passion with the Leicester Bach Choir at Leicester Cathedral in March 1932.

== Career as Laurence Holmes ==
=== 1930s ===
In April 1932 it was announced in the press that Leslie Holmes was changing his performance name to Laurence Holmes (sometimes spelled Lawrence Holmes) in order to avoid confusion with the jazz and popular music singer and instrumentalist Leslie Holmes (of The Two Leslies fame). The autumn of 1932 he performed as a soloist in radio broadcasts with the BBC Theatre Orchestra led by Stanford Robinson. In November 1932 he performed a program of Schubert lieder with the London Diocesan Orchestra conducted by Dorothy Agnes Alice Erhart at Fulham Town Hall. In December 1932 he was a soloist in Dvořák's Stabat Mater with Gloucester Choral Society.

In June 1933 Holmes sang a concert with the BBC Orchestra led by Laurance Turner. The following September he sang the roles of Manoah and Harapha in Handel's Samson at Ebenezer Baptist Church in Coalville. In November 1933 he sang the title role in Mendelssohn's Elijah with the Montreal Elgar Choir led by Berkley E. Chadwick, and performed Vulcan's aria from the opera Philémon et Baucis with the Montreal Orchestra. In 1934 he was the baritone soloist in Elgar's The Dream of Gerontius with the Hamilton Symphony and the Bach-Elgar Choir.

In January 1935 Holmes performed in a concert of music by Beethoven at Working Men's College (WMC), and was a soloist in concert with the Torquay Municipal Orchestra under Ernest Goss which was broadcast on the radio. In March 1935 he gave a recital with Winifred Smith at The Tower House, and the following month he performed on the radio with the BBC Wireless Military Band led by Bertram Walton O'Donnell, Later that year he was the baritone soloist in Edvard Grieg's Landkjenning with the Trent College Choir and conductor Francis Bellringer, and was a guest soloist with the Birmingham Philharmonic Orchestra.

Holmes returned to Lincoln Cathedral to perform in the St Matthew Passion with conductor Gordon Archbold Slater in 1935, and again in 1936. In December 1936 he performed Schumann's song cycle Dichterliebe in another concert at WMC. In January 1937 he performed lieder by Gustav Mahler in a concert at Conway Hall, and the following month he sang a concert on BBC Radio with the Band of the Irish Guards. In April 1937 he performed as a soloist in L'Allegro, il Penseroso ed il Moderato with the Handel Society of London led by Reginald Goodall, and sang George Henschel's "Young Dietrich" in a return to Queen's Hall. In October 1937 he gave a concert at the People's Palace, Mile End, and the following December he performed in concert with violinist Albert Sandler at the Opera House, Royal Tunbridge Wells.

In June 1938 he was a guest soloist in Ada Kent's recital at Wigmore Hall, performing works written by her. Later that year he gave a recital at Aeolian Hall, London, and sang a program of Christmas music by Peter Cornelius for British radio. In 1939 he was a soloist in Bach's Mass in B minor with the Alexandra Choral Society and conductor Charles Proctor, and he recorded Bach's St John Passion for radio broadcast with the BBC Midland Radio Orchestra with conductor Roy Henderson. In June 1939 he performed as a soloist in the concert "Two Hundred Years Ago—Music of 1739" with the BBC Chorus and Orchestra, and sang the world premiere of John Ireland's song cycle Five Sixteenth-Century Poems at Wigmore Hall. In December 1939 he assisted Ralph Vaughan Williams as a performer in his lecture-recital given at Masonic Hall, Dorking.

=== Career during World War II ===
During World War II, Holmes performed in a concert organized by soprano Sarah Fischer to raise money for the War Emergency fund of the Canadian Women's Club of London in 1940. That same year he gave a benefit recital at the Gloucester Cathedral to raise funds for the Musicians Benevolent Fund. He was also active singing in concerts for factory workers during the war as organized by CEMA (the British government's Council for the Encouragement of Music and the Arts). He sang in concerts given for displaced people during the war at shelters, hostels, and rest centers where he also was involved in practical volunteer work of varying kinds.

In January 1940 Holmes performed Cornelius's Weihnachtslieder, Op. 8 in a concert at the National Gallery; returning there the following April to sing Schubert's song cycle Die schöne Müllerin. In March 1940 he was a soloist in Haydn's The Creation at New Siloh Congregational Chapel with John Morgan Lloyd and his orchestra. On April 20, 1940 he joined with soprano Myra Verney to sing the program "Douce France, four centuries of French song" which was recorded for radio broadcast by the BBC Home Service.

On New Years Day 1941 he sang a program of French, Spanish, and British Christmas songs at the theatre of the Bristol Museum & Art Gallery. The following April he performed in Bach's St. John Passion with the Wessex Philharmonic Orchestra and Choir and conductor Cyril Knight. Later that year he gave recitals at the Truro Cathedral and the Bath Assembly Rooms. In October 1941 he sang a concert of British sea songs which was broadcast on the radio in England and Canada. In December 1941 he was a soloist with The Bach Choir in Dvořák's Te Deum at St Martin-in-the-Fields.

In 1942 Holmes gave a recital in the hall at St Gregory's Church, Cheltenham, and returned to the National Gallery to perform in an all-Bach concert. In April 1942 he was soloist in Brahm's A German Requiem with the Whitbourne Choral Society and Orchestra and conductor Paul Vogler. In 1943 he performed the title role in Hubert Parry's Job with the choir of the Leith Hill Musical Festival led by Ralph Vaughan Williams, and performed a concert with violinist May Harrison at St Martin-in-the-Fields. In celebration of conductor Ernest MacMillan's 50th birthday he performed a program of French-Canadian folk songs broadcast on BBC Radio in August 1943.

In late 1943 and early 1944 Holmes performed in the pantomime Humpty Dumpty at the Manchester Hippodrome. In May 1944 he performed with sopranos Gwen Catley and Victoria Sladen; mezzo Edith Coates; tenor Jan van der Gucht; the BBC Theatre Orchestra; and conductor Stanford Robinson in the program "A Tribute to Johann Strauss". He returned to the National Gallery in early December 1944 to sing a recital that included Brahms's song cycle Zigeunerlieder, and then left for Holland where he performed a Christmas Day concert sponsored by the Entertainments National Service Association (ENSA) to British soldiers at the Western Front. He spent two months performing for soldiers with ENSA.

In April 1945 Holmes performed at Acton Town Hall with the Band of the Scots Guards. The following June he gave a recital at Leicester Museum & Art Gallery with Cecil Belcher as his accompanist.

=== Post-War return to Canada: 1945–1946 ===
In September 1945 Holmes moved back to Toronto, Canada, where he balanced a performance schedule while teaching at the Toronto Conservatory as a professor of singing. He gave faculty recitals at the conservatory in October 1945 and May 1946. In December 1945 he was a soloist in Bach's Christmas Oratorio with the Ottawa Choral Union (now Ottawa Choral Society), and gave a recital of Christmas-themed music at Heliconian Hall.

In January 1946 Holmes gave a recital at the Art Gallery of Toronto. In March 1946 he performed the title role in Mendelssohn's Elijah at Massey Hall in a concert celebrating the centennial of that venue. On 11 June 1946 he sang the Christus in St Matthew Passion under conductor Sir Ernest MacMillan at the Montreal Festivals. In June 1946 he performed a farewell recital at the Toronto Conservatory prior to moving back to England.

=== Return to England: 1946–1954 ===
Shortly after returning to England, Holmes gave a recital at Christ Church, Teddington, in September 1946. The following November he was a soloist in a concert at Malvern Hall, Worcester featuring dancer Pola Nirenska and pianist Rachel Cavalho that was organized by the Arts Council of Great Britain. The same month he assisted pianist Harold Craxton as a performer in a lecture-recital he gave at Tobias Matthay's music school in Liverpool, and performed a recital as part of the South Place Concerts series at Conway Hall. He worked as a professor of singing at the Royal Academy of Music in London from 1947 to 1954; also being made an honorary member of that institution.

Holmes reunited with Craxton in January 1947 when he appeared in recital once again at Wigmore Hall (WH). The following month he sang a radio recital program with mezzo Flora Nielsen on BBC Third Programme, and in June 1947 he sang an all-Schubert program at WH. He returned to the Leith Hill Musical Festival in 1947 and 1948 to once again sing Christus in the St Matthew Passion with organist William Cole and Vaughn Williams conducting, and also performed this work with Boyd Neel and his orchestra at Bath Abbey as part of the 1948 Bath International Music Festival. In December 1948 he was a soloist in Bach's Christmas Oratorio at the Wells Cathedral under the baton of Denys Pouncey.

In 1949 Holmes sang in the St Matthew Passion again with the combined choruses of the Stroud Choral Society and the Dursley Bach Choir (March), and at the Lincoln Cathedral (April). In September 1949 he returned to the WH to sing a lieder recital that included Hugo Wolf's Drei Gedichte von Michelangelo and Schubert's Schwanengesang. In 1950 he was a soloist in The Light of Life with the Bishopwearmouth Choral Society at the Elgar Festival, and performed as a soloist in another Elgar work, The Dream of Gerontius, with the Cheltenham Choral Society.

In 1951 Holmes was a soloist in A Sea Symphony with the Bristol Choral Society and the orchestra of the University of Bristol led by W. K. Stanton. In 1952 he was a soloist in the St Matthew Passion with the London Symphony Orchestra and the People's Palace Choral Society led by William Cole, and performed with the City of New Castle Orchestra as a soloist in Mozart's Requiem and Bach's Gottes Zeit ist die allerbeste Zeit, BWV 106 under conductor Kenneth Forbes Malcolmson. He gave a farewell recital at WH in June 1954 with Craxton before leaving England to return to Canada.

=== Later life and career ===
In September 1954 Holmes rejoined the voice faculty at The Royal Conservatory of Music (RCM) in Toronto. He gave a faculty recital in October 1954, and in March 1955 he gave a recital at the Heliconian Club. He was appointed an adjudicator for the vocal competition at the Kiwanis Music Festival during the 1950s. In July 1958 he performed Schubert's Die schöne Müllerin again for a faculty recital at the RCM with Weldon Kilburn as his accompanist. He briefly retired from the RCM in 1959, but after plans in England fell through he returned to the staff of the school in November 1959. He was still teaching voice at the RCM as late as May 1960.

Holmes returned to England in the early 1960s, but came back to Toronto in 1963 where he taught voice out of a private studio. In 1964 he was appointed to the voice faculty of the Royal Hamilton College of Music (RHCM). He gave faculty recitals there in December 1964, November 1965, and November 1966 with Stuart Hamilton as his accompanist. He was still serving on the voice faculty at the RHCM as late as April 1969 when he gave another faculty recital.

Holmes died on March 20, 1983, at Worthing Hospital in Worthing, West Sussex. Several of his pupils had successful careers, including James Milligan, Jan Simons, and Harry Mossfield among others.
