= Annie Mottram Craig Batten =

Canadian singer, vocal instructor and composer

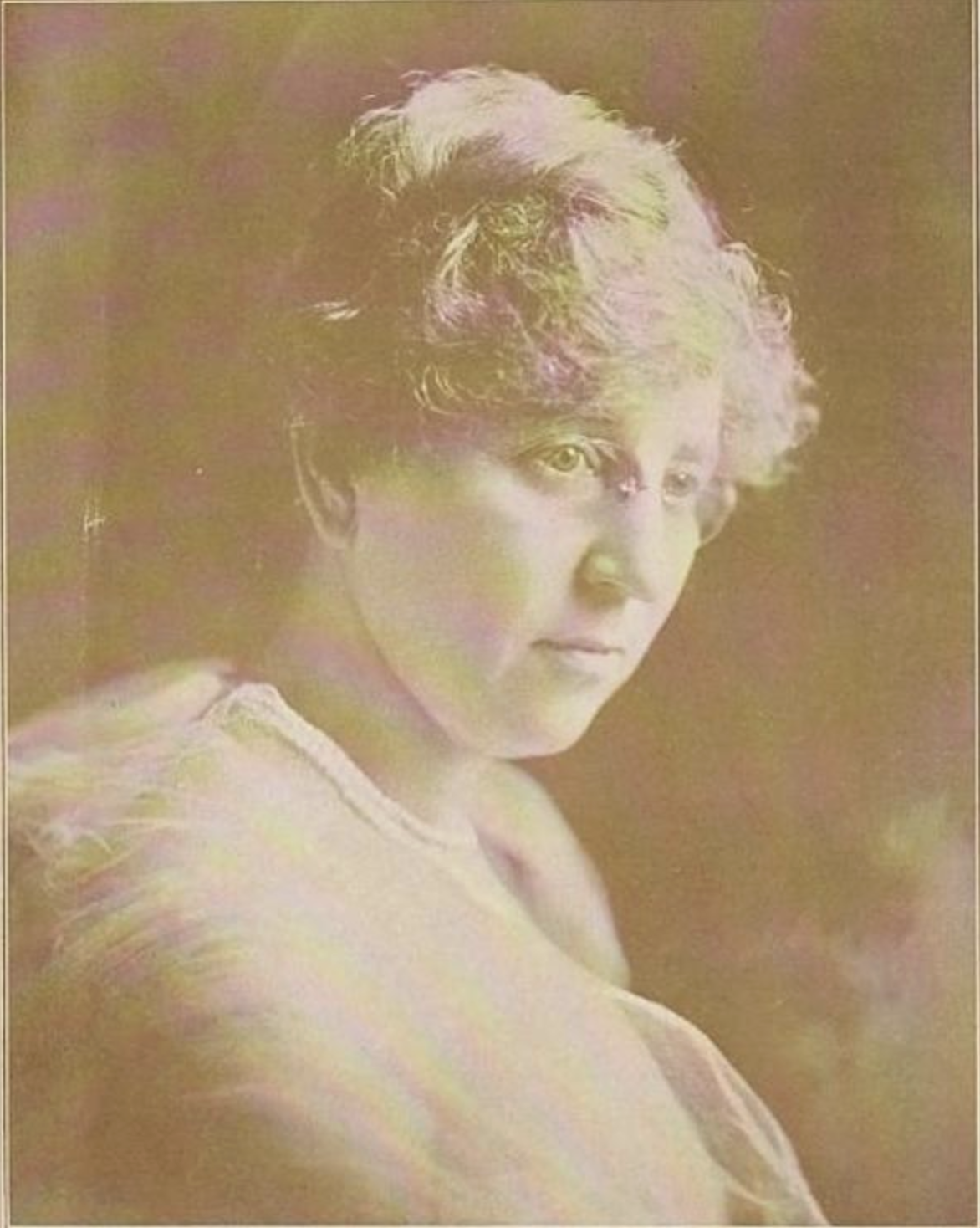
- Craig in 1920
- Born: Annie Harper Mottram; 1883; Canada
- Died: 1964 (aged 80–81)
- Other name: Annie Mottram Craig
- Occupations: Singer; vocal instructor; composer
- Spouses: Andrew Thomas Craig (m. 1906); Charles Thomas Batten, Jr. (m. 1927)

Annie Mottram Craig Batten (née, Mottram; after first marriage, Craig; after second marriage, Batten; 1883–1964) was a Canadian singer, vocal instructor, and composer, active primarily in California. Trained in Ontario, she taught and performed in Canada before settling in Los Angeles, where she became widely known for her work as a church soloist, concert performer, and teacher. Batten held vocal and choral positions at several churches in Southern California, and she taught voice at institutions including the University of Southern California and the State Teachers’ College in Santa Barbara. Her career extended across the Pacific Coast through concert appearances and performances for the Red Cross during World War I, while her teaching career occurred in California and Vermont.

== Early life and education ==
Annie Harper Mottram was born in Canada. She was the eldest daughter of John H. H. and Mary Mottram.

She received her musical education at and graduated from the Toronto College of Music, while the F. H. Torrington was director. She studied under the tuition of Dr. Albert Ham, FRCO, London, Canada and, in harmony, counterpoint and theory, under Humfrey Anger, FRCO, Oxon. She also studied with Arthur J. Hubbard (d. 1929) of Boston and William Yeatman Griffith (1874–1939) of New York City. Her studies included French, Italian and German.

== Career ==
After her graduation, for two years she taught voice, piano and theory in Toronto, and was soprano soloist at the Metropolitan United Church of that city.

Coming to Los Angeles, Batten accepted the soprano position at the First Christian Church of this city, singing there for a year or two prior to her acceptance of a like position at the West Side Congregational Church (California Street, Pasadena, California), and about the same time, she served as director at the Church of the Messiah. While employed at the West Side Congregational Church, on June 27, 1906, she married Andrew Thomas Craig, in All Saints' Church, Toronto. He was an organist of Cowan Avenue Presbyterian Church, Toronto, and a member of the wareroom staff of Gourley, Winter, and Leaming. Subsequent to the marriage, she made her home in Toronto.

She remained in the East a year or two, then returned to Southern California and accepted a two years' engagement at the Mission Inn, in Riverside, California. At the same time, she was soloist at the First Congregational Church of that city.

During World War I, Batten sang for the Red Cross, for the camps and for precinct meetings.

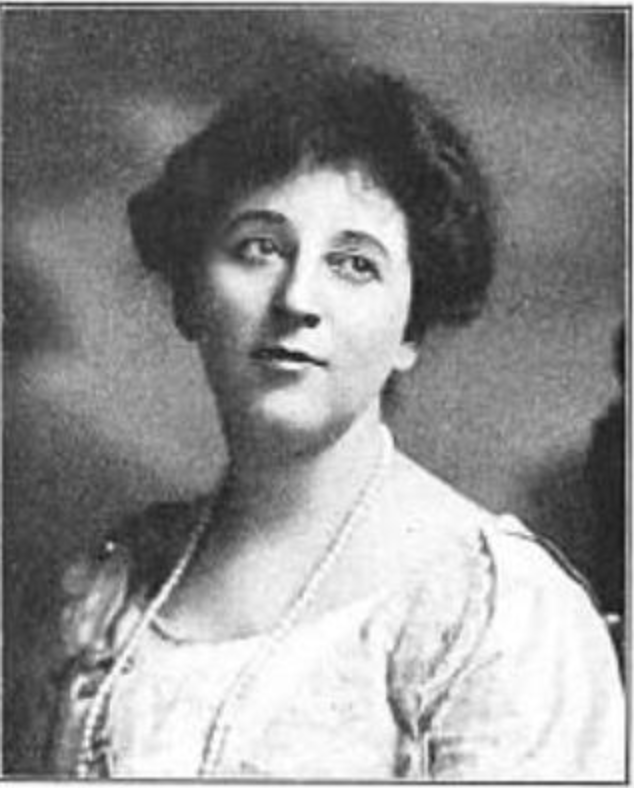
Craig in 1920

In 1920, Batten opened a studio in the Blanchard Hall Studio Building. At the same time, she held a position as soloist and choir director at the Hollywood Christian Church, and was voice instructor at the Elliott School for Girls, Los Angeles.

Batten was a Professor in the Vocal Faculty of the College of Music, University of Southern California (USC). She taught in the State Teachers' College in Santa Barbara (today, University of California, Santa Barbara) during summer sessions, 1921 and was Head of the Music Department, 1922.

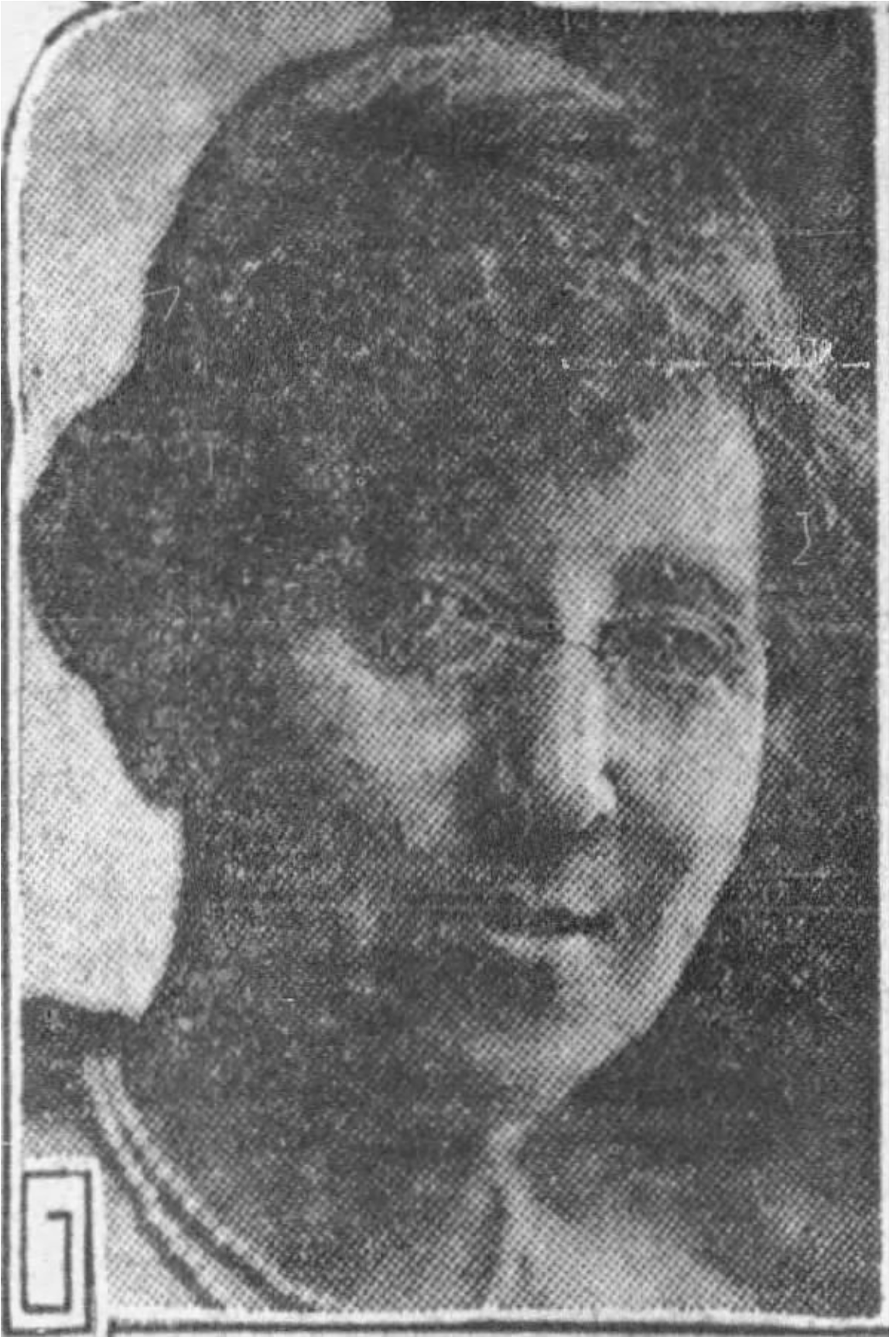
Craig in 1927

In 1927, she was a soprano soloist and director of the choir at St. Paul's Methodist Episcopal Church. In 1931, it was announced that Batten and Minnie West McDonald, a teacher of piano and theory, were opening a piano and voice studio at McDonald's home in Pasadena, California.

The Battens moved to Brattleboro, Vermont in 1938 where her husband joined the medical staff of Brattleboro Retreat. At the same time, Mrs. Batten began teaching vocal classes at an area studio.

Her career included concert tours, and being a soloist for many local women's clubs, such as the Lyric Club and with the Orpheus Club. In addition, Batten composed a few small pieces.

Batten was a member of Pi Kappa Lambda, Sigma Alpha Iota, Artland Club, Music and Fine Arts, MacDowell, L. A. Music Teachers' Association, and Federated Church Musicians.

== Personal life ==
In October 1927, Sigma Tau chapter of Sigma Alpha Iota, national professional music sorority at USC, announced the marriage of Anne Mottram Craig to Charles Thomas Batten, Jr., tenor soloist at St. Paul's Methodist Episcopal Church.

Batten was a resident of California for 35 years, making her home in Los Angeles.

The Los Angeles Times announced that Annie Batten's funeral would occur at Forest Lawn Memorial Park in Glendale, California on 3 June 1964.
