= Montreal Orchestra =

The Montreal Orchestra (MO) was a professional Canadian symphony orchestra based in Montreal, Quebec that was active from 1930–1941. While not Montreal's first orchestra, the MO is considered by music historians to be the first professional symphony orchestra in Montreal. Previous orchestras in that city were much smaller in size and, unlike the MO, utilized amateur musicians. The MO was the first ensemble in Montreal that employed only professional musicians, and the orchestra introduced Montreal's audiences to full symphonic programs for the first time. The ensemble gave the Montreal premieres of numerous works from the standard orchestral repertoire, including pieces by Beethoven, Berlioz, Brahms, Mendelssohn, Rachmaninoff, and Sibelius among others.

== History ==
The MO was the brain child of clarinetist Giulio Romano who banded together the 70 member orchestra after the advent of sound films put many of Montreal's theatre musicians out of work. Douglas Clarke served as the orchestra's conductor and Maurice Onderet served as the orchestra's concertmaster for the ensemble's entire 11-year history.

The MO gave its first performance at the Orpheum Theatre located on Rue Sainte-Catherine Ouest on October 12, 1930. For this first concert the musicians made just $4 a piece. As the orchestra grew in popularity, members were eventually paid $15 a concert, a considerable amount of money during the Great Depression. During the MO's first season of 25 concerts, the orchestra relocated to Her Majesty's Theatre, Montreal (HMT) which remained the orchestra's home for the remainder of its history. The MO produced 10 annual seasons at the HMT, giving more than 200 performances at that theatre. In addition, the orchestra was featured in 10 concerts on the Canadian Pacific Railway radio network in 1932, and was heard on several broadcasts on CBC Radio during the late 1930s. The orchestra also produced a series of popular concerts for children at the Mount Royal Hotel from 1935-1939.

As principal conductor, Clarke led the orchestra in most of its performances and was the driving creative force behind the ensemble's choice of repertoire and programming. Clarke notably conducted the Montreal premiere of Healey Willan's Symphony No. 1 in 1937 and the world premiere of Violet Archer's Scherzo Sinfonico in 1940. The MO also occasionally utilized guest conductors. In 1932 Gustav Holst conducted 'Jupiter' from his The Planets and in 1933 Claude Champagne led the Canadian premiere of his Suite canadienne. Other notable composers who conducted the orchestra in performances of their own works included Reginald de Havilland Tupper (1934 performance of his Suite of Old English Pieces), Henri Miro (his Symphonic Praeludium in 1935), Percy Grainger (his Green Bushes and Colonial Song in 1938), and Alexander Brott (his Oracle in 1939). Conductor Bernard Naylor also led the orchestra in two concerts in 1941.

In 1934 one of the MO's executive board members, Madame Athanase David, left the board after disputes between the anglophone and francophone members of the board came to a head. In order to create a symphony that gave a more substantial place to Quebec soloists, conductors, and composers, she founded the Société des concerts symphoniques de Montréal (SCM) which eventually became the Montreal Symphony Orchestra. Many musicians played in both the SCM and the MO from 1934-1941. The competition between the SCM and the MO had a negative impact on the finances of both orchestras. With the onset of World War II and increasing health issues suffered by Clarke, the MO disbanded after the 1940-1941 season.

== Notable soloists ==
Many notable musicians appeared as guest soloists with orchestra, including the following:

- Webster Aitken
- Ellen Ballon
- Harold Bauer
- Cédia Brault
- Harriet Cohen
- Etta Coles
- Lionel Daunais
- Jeanne Dusseau
- George Enescu
- Emanuel Feuermann
- Ria Ginster
- Gertrude Huntly Green
- Leslie Holmes
- Paul de Marky
- Nathan Milstein
- Séverin Moisse
- Kathleen Parlow
- Ross Pratt
- William Primrose
- Felix Salmond
- E. Robert Schmitz
- Albert Spalding
- Ethel Stark
- Paul Wittgenstein
- Naomi Yanova Adaskin
- Efrem Zimbalist

== Sources ==
- Alexander, B.M. "How the orchestra is financed," Montreal Music Year Book 1931 (Montreal 1931)
- Bell, H.P. "The Montreal Orchestra and Les Concerts symphoniques," Curtain Call, Jan 1940
- Bishop, A.E. The Montreal Orchestra, Retrospect 1930-41, privately published (Montreal 1974)
- Clarke, D. "The Montreal Orchestra," Montreal Music Year Book 1932 (Montreal 1932)
- Dufresne, J. "L'Orchestre symphonique de Montréal," La Lyre, vol 8, Nov 1930
- Herbert, C.H. "History of the Montreal Orchestra," Conservatorium of Music Year Book (Montreal 1935)
