= Stanley Herbert Wilson =

British composer and music teacher

Stanley Herbert Wilson (19 May 1899 – 29 November 1953) was a British composer and music teacher.

== Life ==
Wilson was born on 19 May 1899 at 15 Station Road in Berkhamsted, Hertfordshire.His father, George William Wilson was a railway clerk. His paternal aunt Elizabeth was a music teacher. He attended Berkhamsted School before winning a scholarship to the Royal College of Music in 1915, aged 15. His teachers included Charles Villiers Stanford (composition) and Adrian Boult (conducting).

He met his wife S. Dorothy Thuell at the RCM where she was an accomplished cellist. Thuell attended the Royal College of Music in 1913 from the age of 16, having won the Lesley Alexander Gift. She was also a Wilson, and Dove Scholar.

Thuell, along with Hilda M. Klein and Nancy F. Phillips, gave the first performance of Wilson's Trio for Piano and Strings in E flat in November 1916. In March 1917 she gave the first performance of his String Quartet in A minor with Phillips, Harry Cantor and Sybil Maturin on viola.

In 1917 Wilson left to serve in the war, returning to the college a year later.

In the first of a series of RCM festival concerts in July 1919 to celebrate the twenty-fifth anniversary of the opening of the ‘new’ college building, Wilson conducted his own Scherzo for Orchestra. Other composers featured on the festival programme were Butterworth, Parry, Bridge, Vaughan Williams and Stanford. Edgar Bainton, Charles Wood, Stanford and Bridge also conducted their own compositions, with Adrian Boult conducting the works by Butterworth and Vaughan Williams. That same year, Wilson and Thuell gave the first performance of his Sonata for Violoncello and Pianoforte in a college concert. He also conducted his Serenade for Orchestra in July 1919. Other early works performed at the RCM were his Three Rhapsodies for String Quartet op.13, performed at a college concert in June of 1921. He married Dorothy Thuell that summer on August 8th.

From 1921 to 1945 he was the Music Master at Ipswich Grammar School, and conductor of the Ipswich Philharmonic Society. From 1945 he was Director of Music at Dulwich College, succeeding Arthur Gayford, a post he held for the rest of his life.

In 1937, his Double Concerto for Violin, Viola and Orchestra, with Albert Sammons and Bernard Shore was played at the B.B.C. with Wilson conducting the BBCSO.

At Dulwich, Stanley Wilson set up a close association with the Royal Festival Hall, and 400 boys from the school participated in the Hall's opening celebrations in 1951. In 1953 he prepared the school choir to sing in a recording by Philips of the Berlioz Te Deum under Sir Thomas Beecham, but died suddenly the evening before the performance. The clarinetist Alan Hacker and composer Anthony Payne were pupils at Dulwich College under Wilson.

== Compositions ==
In 1922 Stanley Wilson wrote A Song of Berkhamsted for the Pageant Play at Berkhamsted Castle, when the town was celebrating the 700th Anniversary of the Church of St Peter, Great Berkhamsted. The words to the song were written by Gilbert Hudson, and Wilson set them to music.

In 1927 Wilson won a Carnegie award for his Skye Symphony op 38 (inspired by a holiday on Skye), and the score was published as part of the Carnegie Collection of British Music. It was broadcast by the BBC in 1929 and received performances around the UK, including at Bournemouth, where Wilson went on to become a regular guest conductor of the Municipal Orchestra between 1929 and 1934. In 1929 Wilson conducted his Piano Concerto No 1 at the Proms with James Ching (a pupil of his from Ipswich) as the soloist. The violinist Eda Kersey took up his Violin Concerto in 1930 for three performances. However, the Cello Concerto of 1936 wasn't performed until 1952 by the cellist William Pleeth and the Piano Concerto No 2 wasn't performed at all during the composer's lifetime.

The Portrait Variations, written for the Birmingham Philharmonic String Orchestra, received more attention and were broadcast by the BBC in 1938. Each of the 14 variations reflects the personality (rather than the musical style) of a composer. Bach, Beethoven, Rimsky-Korsakov, Schumann and Debussy are included. One of the movements is a ' Self-Portrait' containing several quotations from his own music. The Boxhill Fantasy for strings also enjoyed several performances, but the Symphony No 2 '1942', with a choral finale and baritone solo, was only recently rediscovered (in the Royal College of Music library by Jürgen Schaarwächter) and remains unperformed. Many of Wilson's other manuscripts are held in the RCM library.

There are archived broadcast performances of the Skye Symphony, Cello Concerto and Double Concerto (1935), but no commercial recordings of Stanley Wilson's music are currently available except for two part songs, performed by The King's Singers in 1987. The City of London Chamber Choir, conducted by Christopher Field (who was taught by Wilson at Dulwich College) gave performances of the Te Deum and Jubilate Deo at St Edmundsbury Cathedral in 2016 and has made recordings available. Some of his educational piano music remains in print and continues to be used. Forsyth publishes four collections of these: Hansel and Gretel, Hiawatha, Ship Ahoy! and Under the Willows.

== Works ==
- Two Preludes for piano (1925)
- Skye Symphony, op 38 (1927)
- Three Rhapsodies for string quartet, op 13 (1927, published OUP)
- Hiawatha, educational piano music (1928)
- Under the Willows, educational piano pieces (1928)
- Scena: The Quest of the Grail for tenor and orchestra (1929)
- Two Impressions for orchestra (1929)
- Piano Concerto No 1, op 46 (1929)
- Hansel and Gretel, educational piano pieces (1929)
- Violin Concerto (1930)
- String Quartet, op 44, The Cuillin (1930) (published OUP)
- Ship Ahoy!, educational piano suite (1932)
- Double Concerto for violin, viola, and orchestra (1935)
- Gaelic Rhapsody for cello and piano
- Cello Concerto (1936)
- Piano Concerto No 2 (1937)
- Boxhill, a Fantasy for Strings (1937)
- Portrait Variations (1938)
- The Legend of Osiris, ballet (1938)
- Symphony No 2 in E minor '1942' (1943)
- Magnificat and Nunc dimittis (Stanley Wilson in C)
- Te Deum Laudamus and Jubilate Deo in C (published 1954)
- Easter Concerto
- King Midas (opera)
- songs and part songs
