= Te Deum (Berlioz) =

1855 musical composition by Hector Berlioz

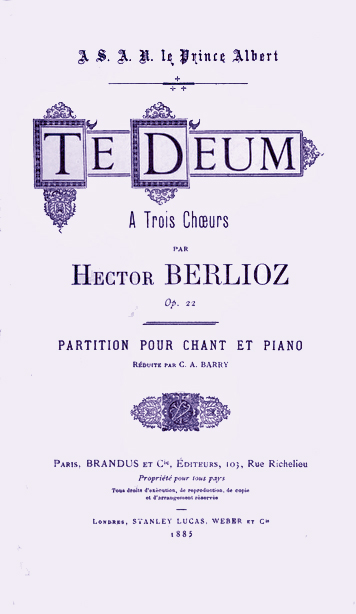
1883 vocal score of the Berlioz Te Deum

The Te Deum (Op. 22 / H.118) by Hector Berlioz (1803–1869) was completed in 1849. Like the earlier and more famous Grande Messe des Morts, it is one of the works referred to by Berlioz in his Memoirs as "the enormous compositions which some critics have called architectural or monumental music." While the orchestral forces required for the Te Deum are not as titanic as those of the Requiem, the work calls for an organ that can compete on equal terms with the rest of the orchestra. It lasts approximately fifty minutes and derives its text from the traditional Latin Te Deum, although Berlioz changed the word order for dramatic purposes.

== Background and premiere ==
The Te Deum was originally conceived as the climax of a grand symphony celebrating Napoleon Bonaparte III., who had become president of the Second Republic in 1848. The finished work was dedicated to Albert, Prince Consort, husband of Queen Victoria. Some of the material used by Berlioz in the piece was originally written for his Messe Solennelle of 1824, thought to have been destroyed by the composer but rediscovered in 1991. The first performance of the work was on 30 April 1855, at the Church of Saint-Eustache, Paris; Berlioz conducted an ensemble of 900 or 950 performers.

== Structure ==
=== Orchestration ===
The choral movements of the Te Deum are scored for:

Woodwinds

4 flutes
4 oboes (one doubling on cor anglais)
4 clarinets (one doubling on bass clarinet)
4 bassoons

Brass

4 horns
2 trumpets
2 cornets
6 trombones
2 ophicleides/tubas

Percussion

timpani

4 tenor drums
bass drum
5 cymbals

Voice

tenor solo
2 large 3-part (STB) mixed choirs
1 large unison children's choir

Keyboards

organ

Strings

12 harps

violins I
violins II
violas
cellos
double basses

There are differences in the orchestration of the non-choral movements. The Prelude calls for a piccolo and 6 snare drums, while the March requires a Saxhorn and 12 harps.

=== List of movements ===
Apart from the rarely performed or recorded orchestral Prelude and Marche pour la présentation aux drapeaux (March for the presentation of the colours), there are six movements to this Te Deum, designated by Berlioz as either hymns (Hymne) or prayers (Prière), except for the last movement which he designated as both. These are listed below:

1. Te Deum (Hymne)
2. Tibi omnes (Hymne)
3. Dignare (Prière)
4. Christe, Rex gloriae (Hymne)
5. Te ergo quaesumus (Prière)
6. Judex crederis (Hymne et prière)

When performed, the Prelude falls between the Tibi omnes and Dignare; the Marche usually comes after the Judex crederis.

== Reception ==
After the first performance in London, in 1887 to celebrate Queen Victoria's Golden Jubilee, The Times commented:

Written to accompany an imaginary triumph of the first Napoleon, it was ultimately dedicated to that peaceful hero the late Prince Consort, and for that reason was an apt contribution to the musical jubilee celebrations which the present year will witness. The score is laid out on a colossal, almost impossible, plan, Berlioz requiring an orchestra of 134 performers, an organ at the opposite end of the church or concert-room, two choirs of 100 singers each, and a third choir of 600 boys, placed midway between organ and orchestra and representing the congregation. Such an army of forces, it need not be added, could not have been accommodated at St. James's-hall had it been available. But, even shorn of this exceptional splendour, the work did not fail to impress the audience with the innate beauty and grandeur of its structure. Berlioz himself placed the finale, "Judex crederis esse venturus" above anything else he had written in the same style, and it would be difficult to disagree with his judgment unless the second movement, "Tibi omnes," should be thought even finer, on account of the marvellous boldness and harmony of its design. But, where everything is so beautiful, it is almost invidious to point to detached merits.

Anton Bruckner, who wrote his own Te Deum in the early 1880s, criticised Berlioz's setting for being too secular, while Camille Saint-Saëns argued that it was well-suited for performance in church.

The second movement, Tibi omnes, was performed by the Sydney Symphony Orchestra, the Sydney Philharmonia Choir, and select members of the Sing 2001 children's choir to accompany the lighting of the Olympic cauldron in the Opening Ceremony of the 2000 Summer Olympics in Sydney, Australia.

== Recordings ==
Conductor	Orchestra	Choir	Tenor	Organ	Label	Year
Sir Thomas Beecham	Royal Philharmonic Orchestra	Dulwich College Boys Choir (prepared by Stanley Wilson), London Philharmonic Choir	Alexander Young	Denis Vaughan	CBS	1951
Colin Davis	London Symphony Orchestra	London Symphony Chorus	Franco Tagliavini	Nicolas Kynaston	Philips	1969
Daniel Barenboim	Orchestre de Paris	Le Chœur de l'Orchestre de Paris, Le Chœur d'Enfants de Paris, La Maîtrise de la Resurrection	Jean Dupouy	Jean Guillou	Columbia Masterworks	1977
Ohannes Tchekidjian	Moscow Philharmonic Orchestra	Armenian SSR Chorus, Children's Choir of the Yerevan Music School	Kārlis Zariņš	Vasily Dolinsky	Melodiya	1979
Claudio Abbado	European Community Youth Orchestra	London Symphony Chorus, London Philharmonic Choir, Wooburn Singers, St Albans School Choir, Haberdashers' Aske's School Choir, The Southend Boys' Choir, Desborough School Choir, The Choir of Forest School, Winnersh, The Choirboys of High Wycombe Parish Church	Francisco Araiza	Martin Haselböck	DG	1981
John Nelson	Orchestre de Paris	Orchestre de Paris Chorus, Children's Choir of the European Union	Roberto Alagna	Marie-Claire Alain	Virgin	2001
Eliahu Inbal	Frankfurt Radio Symphony Orchestra	Frankfurt Vocal Ensemble	Keith Lewis	Matthias Eisenberg	Brilliant	2003
Colin Davis	Dresden Staatskapelle	Dresden Singakademie	Stuart Neill	Hans-Dieter Schöne	Profil	2006

The recordings conducted by Eliahu Inbal and John Nelson include the two sections usually omitted: the Prelude and the Marche pour la présentation aux drapeaux'
