= J. Gibb Morton =

Canadian architect (1876–1949)

John Gibb Morton (14 July 1876 – 13 February 1949) was a Scottish-born Canadian architect noted for his ecclesiastical commissions in early 20th-century Ontario.

== Life and career ==
Morton was born in 1876 in Dennistoun, Glasgow, Scotland. He was educated at the Andersonian Institute, graduating in 1898, and at the Glasgow School of Art. He apprenticed under Glaswegian architect John Hamilton, become his chief assistant from 1897 to 1902. He then moved to London, becoming a draftsman in the offices of Sir Aston Webb. In 1904, he returned to Glasgow to work as an assistant to Sir John James Burnet. At this time, Morton entered into a partnership with George N. Beattie, unsuccessfully entering a number of local competitions as Beattie & Morton. The partnership was dissolved in 1907 and from then Morton worked under his own name.

In 1910, Morton emigrated to Canada, settling in Toronto. He joined the Dominion Realty Company, the real estate arm of the Canadian Bank of Commerce. He worked as a staff architect for 16 years, becoming chief draftsman, before focusing on his ecclesiastical commissions.

While employed by the Dominion Realty Co., Morton began accepting freelance commissions from Anglican, Baptist, Presbyterian, Roman Catholic and United Church congregations. His finest works are considered to be the rebuilding of Metropolitan United Church after it was gutted by fire in 1928 and Blessed Sacrament Roman Catholic Church in the Glebe, Ottawa, completed in 1932. His ecclesiastical work encompassed the Romanesque Revival, Byzantine Revival and Gothic Revival styles. He was a member of the Royal Architectural Institute of Canada and the Ontario Association of Architects.

Morton was married twice: first, in 1911, to Jessie Coulson (died 1919), with whom he had two sons, and secondly, in 1920, to Nellie Foley Brennan, with whom he had a further two sons and three daughters. His stepson, John Frank Brennan, a son of his second wife from her first marriage, also became an architect, specializing in Catholic churches and schools in Ontario.

Morton died at St. Michael's Hospital on February 13, 1949, aged 72. His funeral was held at St. Vincent de Paul Roman Catholic Church, where he was a parishioner, and he was interred in Mount Hope Catholic Cemetery.

== Select works ==
Work	Location	Dates	Notes	Image
St. Anne's Roman Catholic Church	Glace Bay, Nova Scotia	1919–1936	Destroyed by fire in 1982.	
Waverley Road Baptist Church	The Beaches, Toronto	1921		
First Avenue Baptist Church	Riverdale, Toronto	1925	Rebuilding after fire. Now Toronto Community Alliance Church.	
Corpus Christi Roman Catholic Church	The Beaches, Toronto	1925–1927		
St. Brigid's Roman Catholic Church	East Danforth, Toronto	1926–1927		
Metropolitan United Church	Garden District, Toronto	1928–1929	Rebuilding after fire.	
Melrose United Church	Hamilton, Ontario	1928–1929		
Our Lady of Perpetual Help Roman Catholic Church	Moore Park, Toronto	1929–1930		
Blessed Sacrament Roman Catholic Church	Lytton Park, Toronto	1929–1930		
Knox Presbyterian Church	Fort Erie, Ontario	1929–1930		
Forward Baptist Church	Upper Beaches, Toronto	1929		
St. Joseph's Roman Catholic Church	Sandy Hill, Ottawa	1931–1932	Rebuilding after fire.	
Blessed Sacrament Roman Catholic Church	The Glebe, Ottawa	1932		
Christ the King Roman Catholic Church	Long Branch, Toronto	1939–1940		
St. Anselm's Roman Catholic Church, School and Rectory	Leaside, Toronto	1939–1941	Church demolished and replace with a larger building in 1963.	
Cloverhill Apartments	Bay-Cloverhill, Toronto	1939		
