= Luigi von Kunits =

Canadian conductor, composer, violinist and pedagogue

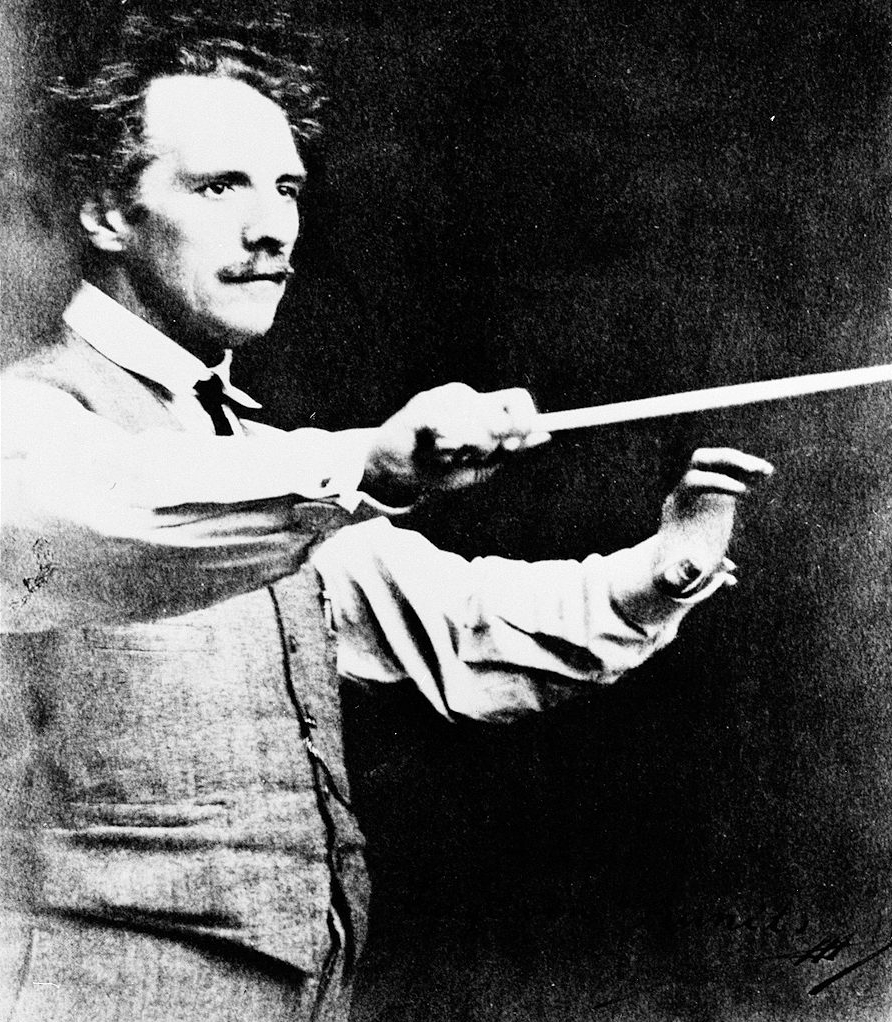
- Born: Ludwig Paul Maria von Kunits; 20 July 1870; Vienna, Austria-Hungary
- Died: 8 October 1931 (aged 61); Toronto, Ontario, Canada
- Occupations: Conductor, composer, violinist, and pedagogue

Ludwig Paul Maria "Luigi" von Kunits (20 July 1870 – 8 October 1931) was a Canadian conductor, composer, violinist, and pedagogue. Born in Austria, he studied at the Vienna Conservatory. He later moved to Canada where he was the founding conductor of the Toronto Symphony Orchestra in 1922.

== Early career ==
During this time, however, he had composed a Violin Concerto and he had been asked to perform it with the Vienna Philharmonic Orchestra. It was so well received that he had no trouble obtaining a position with the Austrian Orchestra as it assistant conductor and concertmaster. It was also at this juncture that he decided to embark on a tour of the United States in 1893, abandoning the career chosen for him by his mother. His parents were heart-broken at his sudden departure.

After playing with the Austrian Orchestra at the Chicago World's Fair, and taking the first prize trophy in an open competition, he decided to remain in the U.S.

In Chicago, he taught violin and composition and led a String Quartet he personally founded. He came to Pittsburgh which had been without a professional symphony orchestra until 1895 when British conductor Frederic Archer took the baton. With Archer at the helm, von Kunits had organized and shaped an ensemble into a respectable orchestra. During the next 14 years, von Kunits was the Pittsburgh Symphony Orchestra's concertmaster, first violin, and assistant conductor to Frederic Archer (from 1896 to 1898), Victor Herbert (from 1898 to 1904), and finally Emil Pauer (from 1904 to 1910) when the orchestra came into financial difficulties and was dissolved.

Also, it was in the United States that he first became aware of his Serbian roots. At Chicago's Columbian Exposition he witnessed Nikola Tesla's alternating current system running everything mechanical, not to mention the illumination of the entire exposition itself. In Pittsburgh, he saw Serbian steelworkers forming one of the oldest Serbian fraternal organizations (the Serb National Federation) in 1901, and in 1907, merging with Michael I. Pupin's Sloga (Unity).

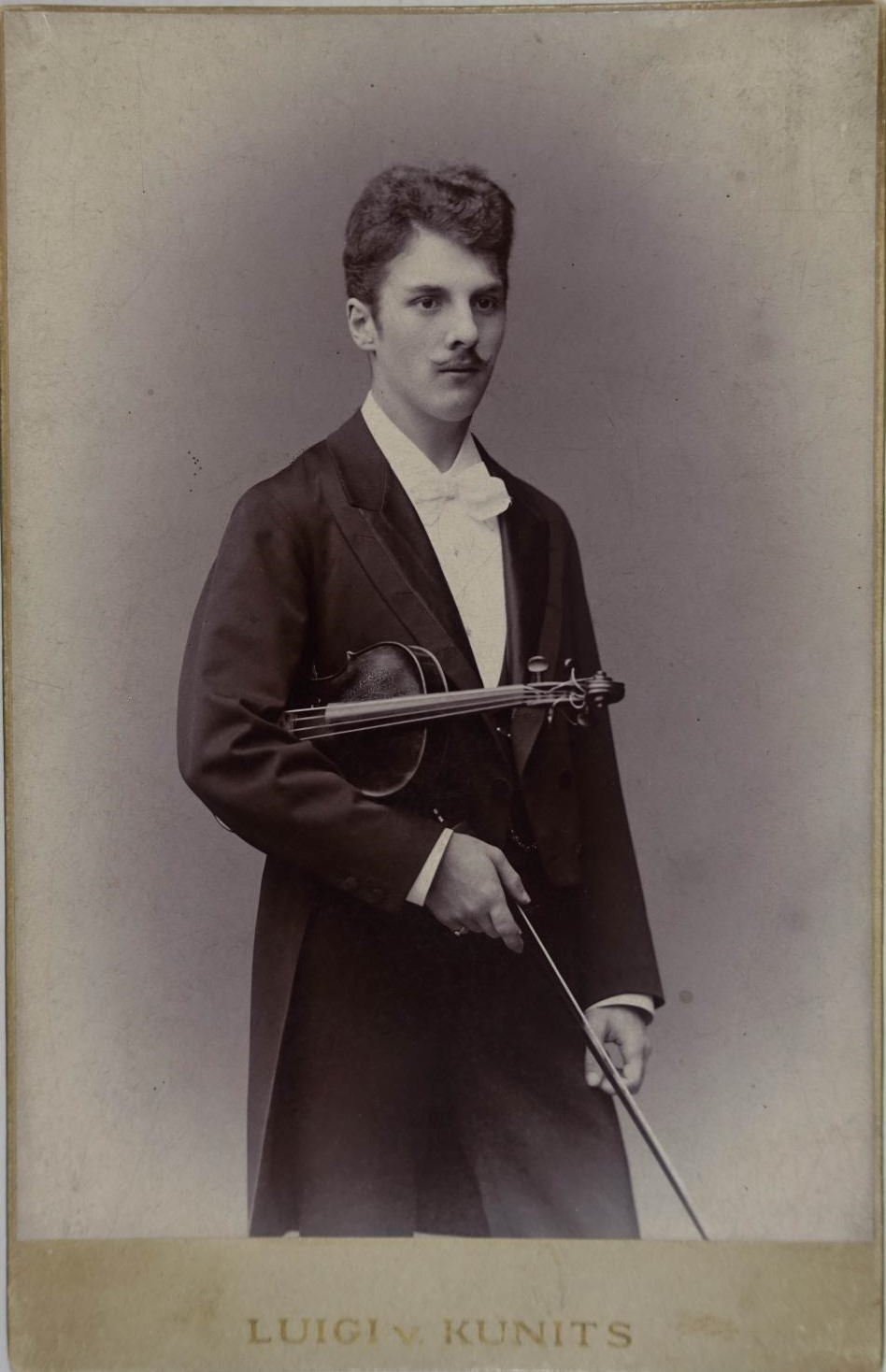
Luigi von Kunits at the age of 27 as concertmaster, first violinist, and assistant conductor to Frederic Archer at the Pittsburgh Symphony Orchestra from 1896 to 1898

== Marriage and honeymoon ==
It was in Pittsburgh that he befriended Joseph Henry Gittings, a gifted organist and impresario, and Harriet Jane, his beautiful daughter. After a brief courtship marriage became a foregone conclusion. The honeymoon was in the offing and von Kunits decided to take a trip with his new bride to introduce her to his parents. Last but not least, von Kunits could foresee that he might need some free time to settle some unresolved family affairs in Vienna. On returning for the first time since he left in 1893, he found his father and mother sorely strained by the seven years between them.

After a long honeymoon, they returned to Pittsburgh, where their two daughters were born. As an enthusiastic Greek scholar and a bit of an eccentric he had them duly christened Nausicaa, for the daughter of Alcinous in Homer's Odyssey, and Aglaia, for the youngest of the Three Charities (Graces) in Classical mythology. Aside from the Pittsburgh Symphony, he directed a series of String Quartet concertos, taught at the Pittsburgh Conservatory, and later at his own school.

== Performing career ==
Then in 1910, he made a decision to return to Vienna to give concerts throughout Europe, appearing not only in recitals as a guest artist with orchestras, but also in chamber music concerts. Back from his concert tours, he was widely acclaimed by his peers. Moriz Rosenthal, Louis Rée (1861–1939), Vladimir de Pachmann, Emil Pauer, Fritz Kreisler and Eugène Ysaÿe all came to pay homage to a fine musician as was customary in music circles of the day. Between recitals, he remained active by teaching at the world-famous Patony Conservatory in Vienna. Many of his closest friends from his childhood days came long distances to see him, but it was his father's presence that gave him the deepest pleasure. The start of the First Balkan War in 1912, pitting Serbia and its Balkan allies against the Ottoman Empire, suddenly awakened an intense fervor of patriotism, equally shared by his father.

In 1912, Dr. T. Alexander Davies, a Toronto doctor, who arrived for postgraduate studies at Vienna's Medical School, came with a faculty offer (head of the violin department) from Colonel Albert Gooderham, president of the newly established Canadian Academy of Music. A more prestigious offer came at the same time, the Philadelphia Orchestra needed a new conductor. Von Kunits, whose first love was conducting, was recovering from a mild heart attack, and so decided in favor of Toronto instead. (The man who accepted the Philadelphia position declined by von Kunits was Leopold Stokowski.)

== Back to North America ==
The von Kunitses sailed to Canada with their newborn son, Astyanax, aptly named in the Classical tradition. His daughters were left at a boarding school to complete their education. But with the outbreak of the First World War, von Kunits got the news that his estate was lost, confiscated by the Austrians who were at war with Serbia. Von Kunits came from a line of Serbian Hussars who fought Ottoman occupiers at the border of Austria and Hungary. When Turks threatened to invade Western Europe, one of Kunich's ancestors rescued a prince of the realm who was badly wounded in battle, and consequently received a patent of nobility for his heroic action.

His daughters soon joined the family fold in Toronto, Ontario. He was at Toronto's Canadian Academy of Music, eagerly awaiting the arrival of his students, when World War I broke out in August 1914. When Canada entered the war, von Kunits found himself in an untenable position even in Toronto.

== Internment ==
Immediately following the outbreak of the First World War, all citizens or former citizens of the Austrian Empire were deemed by the Canadian government as enemy aliens regardless of their ethnic origin. So was the case of Luigi von Kunits although he renounced his allegiance to Austria. Canada, gripped as it was in war fever, engaged in a fiercely hostile attack on anything or anyone Austrian and German. He persistently maintained that he was by descent a Serbian and had severed his ties with Austria for that reason.

Abuse and antagonism were felt by von Kunits throughout the war years. It was a tragic time for him. He had to report in line with all the rest of the aliens once or twice a week. It included not only Austrians, Hungarians, and Germans, but even Serbs, Croats, Slovenes, Czechs, Slovaks, Ukrainians, Ruthenians, Rusyns, Rumanians, Italians (from Trieste, then part of the Austrian Empire) and other nationalities who came from territories ruled by the Habsburg monarchy. He was luckier than most, however, many ex-Austrian citizens were sent to concentration camps as "enemy aliens" to perform forced labor in steel mills, forestry, mines, etc. (Recently the Canadian First World War Internment Recognition Fund was created to recognize this sad period in Canadian history.)

"He would arrive at home white and drawn after these sessions. It was not an easy task for a sensitive musician and scholar, man of honor and simple kindness to face this ordeal," so wrote von Kunits' daughter, Mrs. Aglaia Edwards, in Mayfair Magazine. "He never uttered a word of complaint. Stoically he realized he simply had to report and that was the thing to do." But he did not withdraw completely from his concert work, he played at concerts where and when he could. He lived a secluded life in Toronto which was to be his home for the rest of his life. During this period he founded The Canadian Music Journal, taught violin and harmony to his admiring students, instilling the love of chamber music in them all. The war over, von Kunits returned to the concert platform with a recital in Massey Hall. The sorrowful waiting through the long years finally brought fruit. Von Kunits, who renounced his Austrian citizenship at the beginning of the war, finally became a Canadian citizen.

== The Toronto Symphony Orchestra ==
Although Toronto had been a major music centre in Canada until 1917, in 1922 it was still without a professional symphony orchestra. Two young musicians, Louis Gesensway and Abe Fenboque, decided to approach von Kunits to tackle the difficult task of establishing the Toronto Symphony Orchestra. (check 12) The Toronto Star had, about that time, mentioned an attempt by Flora Eaton to get Sergei Rachmaninoff for the podium, but it all came to naught.

The sixty musicians who turned up for the first rehearsal were all from the orchestral pits of the silent-movie houses; the only free time they had for concerts was between matinees and evening shows. Von Kunits was assured that "there were sufficient skilled players, some of whom had played in Frank Welsman's Toronto Orchestra -- an organization founded in 1907 and which had become a casualty of the war in 1918 -- and some of whom, as von Kunits knew, were better musicians than their theatre jobs allowed them to show."

After some reflection, von Kunits accepted. Through the winter, he coached and encouraged some of his more advanced students so that they might be ready. He worked with theatre house musicians. And he spent sleepless nights re-scoring the music for his players and their instruments, keeping in mind their capacities.

By spring, von Kunits had brought the orchestra together, making it coalesce from its disparate elements was not easy. One musician of that time recalled a rehearsal when von Kunits could not get any kind of warmth and color from the cello section, even though the piece was marked appassionata.

"He tapped his music stand, looked solemnly at the whole string section, and said quietly: 'Would all those men under 60 please vibrate.' The difference at the next attempt was more notable."

On April 23, 1923, at five p.m. the New Symphony Orchestra, with von Kunits at the baton, made its debut in Massey Hall. With an initial complement of some sixty players, it soon became the eighty-five member Toronto Symphony Orchestra in 1927, offering full-length concerts. After successful tours in Canada and the United States, audiences got bigger. Von Kunits brought the orchestra recognition and wide appeal. The excellence of his string section became the envy of other orchestras. Stokowski invited two of his pupils, Gesensway and Manny Roth, to join the Philadelphia Orchestra. By drawing into it some of the world's finest instrumentalists, Stokowski succeeded in creating the distinctive "Philadelphia sound" which brought his orchestra international acclaim. Other von Kunits's pupils of note were the U.S. composer Charles Wakefield Cadman, long-forgotten violinist and recording pioneer Vera Barstow, Canadian composers and violinists Harry Adaskin, Murray Adaskin, Maurice Solway, Eugene Kash, Grace McDonald. Indeed, von Kunits shaped a generation of string players, some of whom continued to play with the Toronto Symphony Orchestra in 1980.

After nine years of struggle to win a place for a first-rate orchestra in Canada, von Kunits died on October 8, 1931.

Von Kunits left behind a tradition of musicianship and a framework of two potentially fine orchestras—the Pittsburgh Symphony and the Toronto Symphony. Conductor Sir Adrian Boult of the London Philharmonic Orchestra once said of von Kunits that he was "rehearsing a soul without a body."

Many distinguished musicians were his pupils, including Vera Barstow, Murray Adaskin, Arthur Hartmann, Alberto Guerrero, Grace McDonald, and others.

== Works ==
- 3 Etudes for Violin (Kunits, Luigi von)

== Sources ==
- Ford, Clifford (16 December 2013). "Luigi von Kunits". The Canadian Encyclopedia. Historica Canada. Archived from the original on April 17, 2005.
