= Albert Ham =

Canadian organist (1858–1940)

- Born: 7 June 1858; Bath, Somerset, England
- Died: 4 February 1940 (aged 81); Brighton, England
- Education: Trinity College Dublin
- Occupations: Organist; Choral conductor; Academic teacher
- Organizations: Cathedral Church of St. James; Royal Canadian College of Organists; Toronto Conservatory

Albert Ham (7 June 1858 – 4 February 1940) was an English and Canadian organist, choral conductor, composer, music textbook author, and music educator. He worked as an organist and choirmaster at a variety of churches in England prior to coming to Canada where he served as the organist and choirmaster of the Cathedral Church of St. James (CCSJ), Toronto, from 1897 to 1933. He was known for banning women from the choir at CCSJ during his tenure. He was a founding member of the Royal Canadian College of Organists, and served as that organization's first president from 1909 to 1921.

Ham was the founder and conductor of the National Chorus of Toronto which he led from 1903 until it dissolved in 1928. He taught on the faculties of several institutions in Canada, including the Toronto Conservatory (later The Royal Conservatory of Music) and the University of Toronto, training several singers and organists of note. He ended his career as an examiner at Bishop's University, and after his retirement in 1936 he returned to England where he died in 1940.

== Early life and career in England ==
The son of Robert Dillon Ham and Elizabeth Ham (née Ridley), Albert Ham was born in Bath, Somerset, England, on 7 June 1858. He received his early music education in his native city from the organist and composer James Kendrick Pyne and from Joseph Hewitt. He was a boy chorister at St John's Church, Bath from 1866 to 1872, and was appointed sub-organist at that church in 1875. He was educated at Bath School.

Ham was appointed organist and choirmaster of All Saints' Church in Bath on Park St. in 1876, a post he left when he was appointed organist and choirmaster at St Mary's Church, Ilminster, in 1877. He remained at his post in Ilminster until 1892 when he was appointed organist and choirmaster at St John the Evangelist, Taunton where he was also conductor of the Taunton Choral Society and the Taunton Madrigal Society until emigrating to Canada in 1897. In 1883 he was made a Fellow of the Royal College of Organists. In 1894 he earned a Doctorate of Music from Trinity College Dublin.

== Career in Canada ==
Ham came to Toronto from England in 1897 to succeed Stocks Binns Hammond in the post of organist and choirmaster at Cathedral Church of St. James (CCSJ). He remained there until his resignation 36 years later in 1933. Prior to his arrival women were allowed to serve as members of the CCSJ's choir, but Ham abolished this practice, making the chorus only open to the male sex for his entire tenure at the church. In 1903 he founded the National Chorus of Toronto which he conducted until its dissolution in 1928. In 1909 he was a founding member of the Royal Canadian College of Organists (then known as the Canadian Guild of Organists), and served as that organization's first president from 1909 to 1921. He also served as president of the Empire Club of Canada in 1915–1916.

Ham simultaneously worked as a music educator at several institutions, teaching both organ and vocal performance as well as music composition on the faculties of the Toronto Conservatory (1897–1919 and 1924–1932) and the Canadian Academy of Music (1919–1924). He was also a lecturer at the University of Toronto for many years, beginning in 1908. His notable pupils included Metropolitan Opera contraltos Jeanne Gordon and Margaret Keyes, baritone Leslie Holmes, organist W. H. Hewlett, soprano Helen Sherry, and composer Annie Mottram Craig Batten. He was an examiner for Bishop's University from 1923 to 1936, and was awarded an honorary Doctor of Civil Law from that university in 1933.

Ham wrote three volumes for the Canadian Music Text-Book series which were published between 1914 and 1924. In this period he also worked as an appointed government inspector for the Ontario School for the Blind. As a composer he is best known for creating the cantata The Solitudes of the Passion which premiered in Toronto in April 1925. He also composed anthems, choral works, hymns, songs, works for solo organ, and orchestral works.

== Retirement and death ==
Ham returned to England upon his retirement in 1936. He died in Brighton, England, on 4 February 1940 at the age of 81.
