= Five Sixteenth-Century Poems =

Five Sixteenth-Century Poems is a song cycle for voice and piano composed in 1938 by John Ireland (1879–1962). The cycle was given its world premiere by baritone Laurence Holmes with Ireland as accompanist at Wigmore Hall on June 28, 1939.

A performance takes about 10 minutes. The poems are:

1. "A Thanksgiving" (William Cornysh (1465–1523))
2. "All in a Garden Green" (Thomas Howell (fl. 1568))
3. "An Aside" (Anon.)
4. "A Report Song" (Nicholas Breton (1542–1626))
5. "The Sweet Season" (Richard Edwardes (1525–66))
