= Toronto Philharmonic Society =

The Toronto Philharmonic Society was one of the first secular music organizations in Toronto, Ontario, Canada. The Society included both singers and instrumentalists.

== History ==
The Society was founded in 1845 by John McCaul, who was at the time president of King's College. It became inactive in the late 1860s, but was revived in 1872 by McCaul and organist James P. Clarke, who became its conductor. Under his leadership the Society presented Handel's Messiah at Shaftesbury Hall in 1873, with more than 150 voices.

Frederick Torrington took over as conductor later that year, and the group went on to perform many oratorios, including premiers of Canadian works. The Society also performed both vocal and instrumental classical music and selections from operas. Most of the performances took place at Shaftesbury Hall and at the Horticultural Pavilion in Allan Gardens, and many of the pieces performed had not been heard in Canada before.
