= St. Joseph's Parish (Ottawa) =

Coordinates: 45.425233°N 75.684825°W

- At St. Joseph's Church
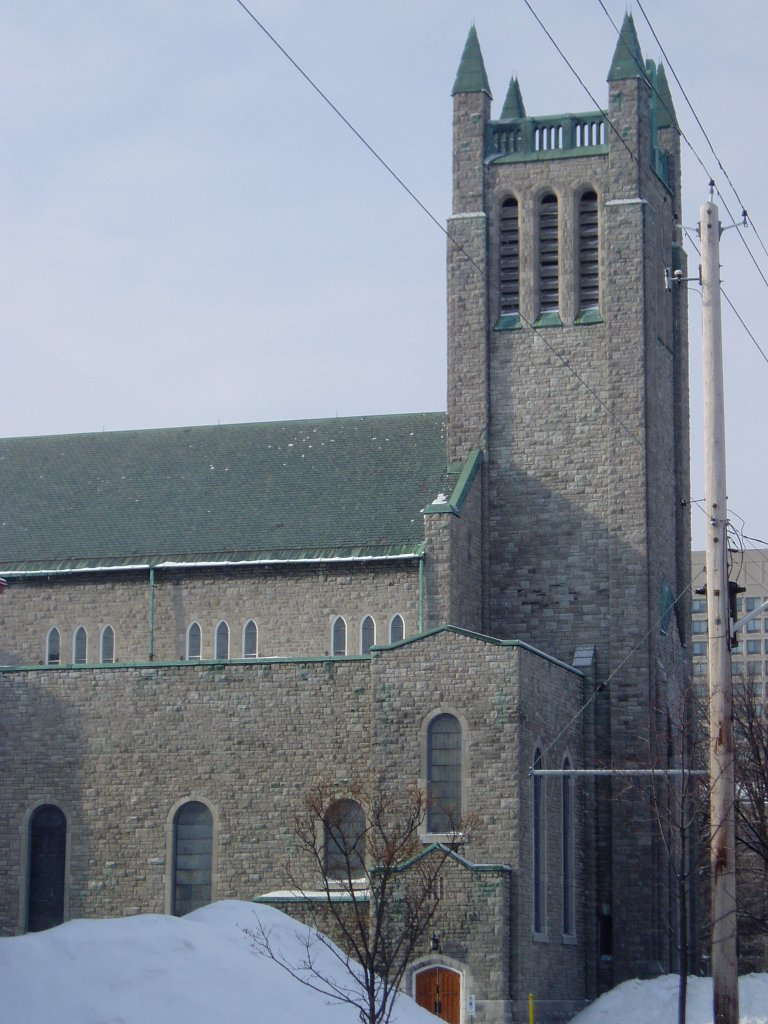
- St. Joseph's Catholic Church
- St. Joseph's Parish
- Denomination: Roman Catholic
- Religious order: Missionary Oblates of Mary Immaculate
- Website: http://www.st-josephs.ca/ Parish homepage

Architecture
- Architect(s): John Gibb Morton, George Oakley & Sons, James Mercer & Sons
- Architectural type: Neo-Gothic

Administration
- Province: O.M.I. Lacombe
- Diocese: Archdiocese of Ottawa-Cornwall

St. Joseph's Parish is a Roman Catholic parish in Ottawa, Ontario, Canada. It is an Anglophone congregation located very near its partner parish, the Francophone Église Sacré-Cœur. The church and parish are administered by the Missionary Oblates of Mary Immaculate (OMI), while under the ownership of the Archdiocese of Ottawa-Cornwall. The congregation's home is at St. Joseph's Church, which shares the same titular patron saint.

Original high altar, altar rail, and reredos, which does not exist today. Taken in the 1970s. Photographer unknown.

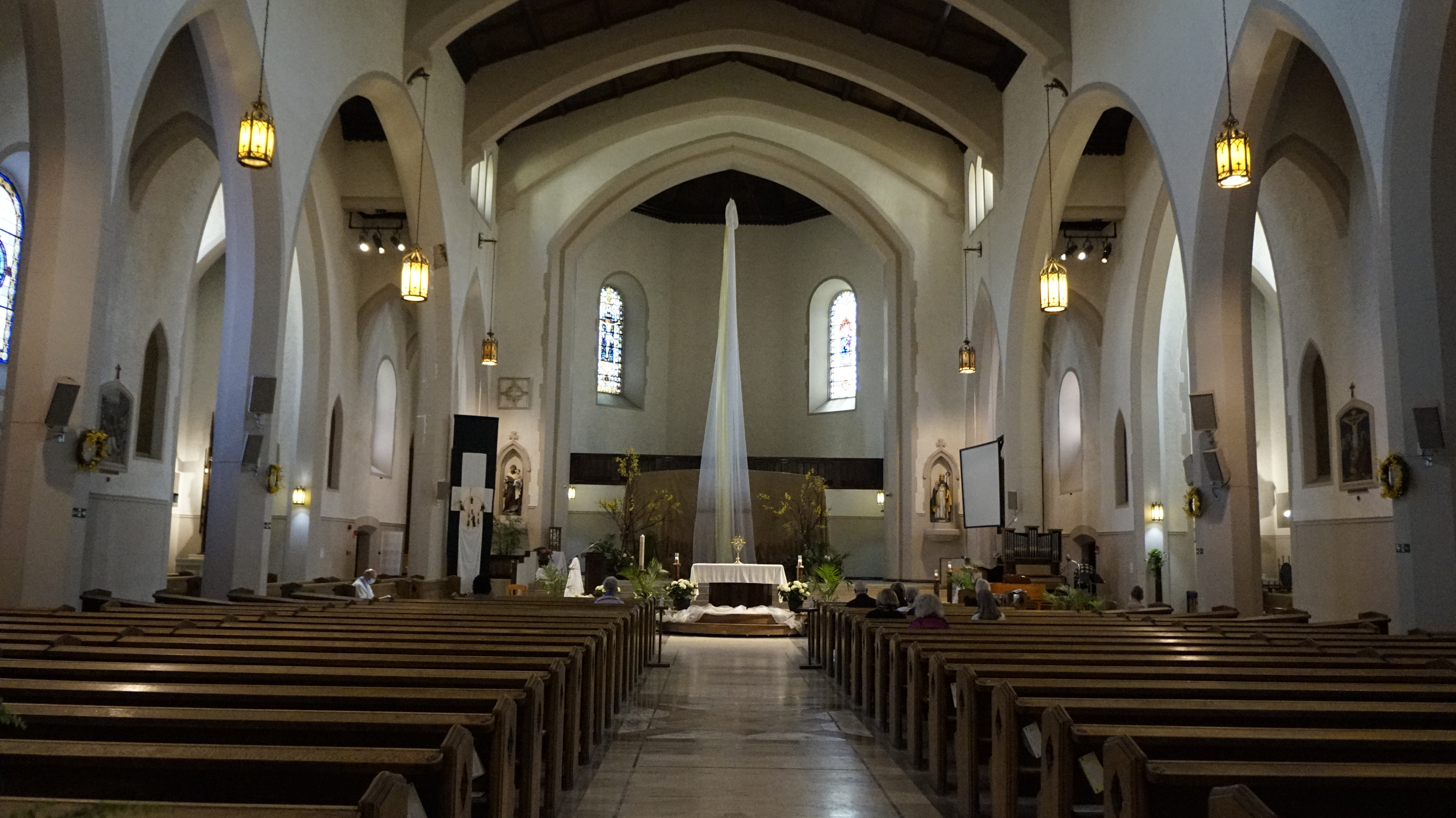
Present Interior taken during Adoration

== History ==
=== First Church and Early Parish History (1856 - 1892) ===
The parish was founded in 1856 by missionaries from the Missionary Oblates of Mary Immaculate. The church was built on what was believed to be the resting places of many labourers killed in the construction of the Rideau Canal.

In 1828, Lieutenant-Colonel John By granted land (most of today's Sandy Hill) to one of his lieutenants, René Léonard Besserer. Besserer died in March 1823, and his older brother Louis-Théodore Besserer was his heir. Louis Besserer immediately set to work dividing Sandy Hill into lots, however those lots proved difficult to sell due to the sandy and unproductive land, and the lack of churches, schools and business. By 1845, Besserer transferred six of these lots over to the Roman Catholic Church for them to establish a church and a college. On this land was built the first Saint Joseph's Church, and the re-located College of Ottawa.

On 29 August 1856 Saint Joseph's Parish was founded. In 1857, Rev. Damase Dandurand, a Roman Catholic priest and member of the Oblate Order, designed St. Joseph's "near the College in St. George's Ward", which was styled in a "Rustico-Tuscan order". The first church was not consecrated until 19 March 1858. The building was a small traditional stone church with few notable architectural features, other than a clock above the door, and the first church bells in Ottawa. It could seat 230 parishioners on its 92 benches. Following the naming of Ottawa as the capital and the subsequent transfer of a few hundred civil servants to Ottawa, many of those civil servants began to attend Saint Joseph's. As a result of this, it was decided that the church was too small, and in 1866 two transepts were added. Those two transepts added 138 new benches, bringing the total number of benches up to 230. The congregation continued to grow. In 1889, the church's French community built their own church. Despite the building of the Église Sacré-Cœur (which is still standing just across Laurier) and the 100 families that left Saint Joseph's, the old church was still too small for the ever-growing congregation, and on 23 April 1890, the Superior General of the Oblates authorised the preparation of plans for a new church. The last mass was held at the original Saint Joseph's in February 1892.

=== Second Church (1893 - 1930) ===
On 23 January 1892, a contract was signed with William Edward Doran of Montreal to build the second church on Wilbrod Street at Cumberland Street 1892-93. Construction began four months later, and the cornerstone ceremony was held on 26 June 1892. The new church was dedicated on 19 November 1893, and could seat 1100 people. The second church was 62’ high, 192’ long, 75’ wide (expanding to 105’ at the transepts), and had a 192’ tall tower. The church was built in the Roman Renaissance style, and was decorated in a way that was similar to Notre Dame. One notable detail of the construction is that the foundation was well enough built that it was able to be reused when the current church was built. The second church survived for 37 years before it was destroyed by fire on the night of 27 December 1930.

=== Third Church (1932 - Present) ===
==== Prior to Vatican II ====
Work on the third church was commenced shortly after the fire. Not only was the church built on the foundations of the second church, parts of the exterior wall up to the stained glass windows were retained. In rebuilding the church, the architectural style was changed from Roman Renaissance to Neo-Gothic, and in order to make the building more fire-resistant, Father Finnegan replaced the varnished wooden walls with bare cement brick walls. On 4 January 1932, then archbishop Guillaume Forbes of Ottawa consecrated the marble altar. It is this third church that still stands today.

Two brass plaques were erected by the St Joseph's Parish in honour of those parishioners who served with the allied forces in World War I, many of whom laid down their lives. A memorial framed scroll with the names of all members of St. Joseph`s parish who volunteered for active service with Canada`s fighting forces in the Second World War and a Memorial Book with short biographies of those members who gave their lives were erected by the St Joseph`s parish.

From the mid-1950s to the late 1960s the parish observed a significant decline in regular attendance and the number of parishioners. Various attempts were made by the parish and it's respective priests throughout these decades in order to revitalize attendance. Among these efforts included folk masses, charismatic prayer meetings, parish picnics, and the division of the parish into subgroups called "wards" in order to increase interpersonal relationships at the local level among the laity. The further acquisition of homes in the neighbourhood by the nearby University of Ottawa lead to a further decline in attendance and parishioners. By the late 1970s, the parish understood it to be that there were too few parishioners to maintain services in the church, and amalgamation of the parish to another parish was considered.

==== Post Vatican II ====
Kyrie Eleison chant sung in St. Joseph's Church on Maundy Thursday, 2026, during Holy Week. The cantor, choir, parish laity, and organ can be heard.

The reforms of the Second Vatican Council brought significant changes to both the parish culture and architecture of St. Joseph's parish. Many lay ministries were discontinued, for various reasons, and new ministries were created to increase both lay involvement with the parish and the parish's involvement with the neighbouring community. Mass attendance occasionally slowed down and rose up again during these years. Among the new ministries created, those that survived to the present day include (but are not limited to) the St. Joe's Women's Centre, St. Joe's Supper table, and the Refugee Outreach Committee. The liturgy was modified and had various additions introduced, such as lay Eucharistic Ministers, lay homilies, liturgical dancing, and the reception of communion under both species, among many others. Among that which was removed, included (but is not limited to) kneeling throughout the mass, traditional acolytes and vested servers, altar bells, the processional cross, reception of the host upon the tongue, and the practice of saying "amen" after receiving the host. Reactions to these changes by parishioners was multi-faceted and complex, some left the parish to other nearby parishes, others joined the parish specifically due to these changes.

In terms of the architecture, the original marble high altar and the Neo-Gothic oak wood reredos designed by architect J. Gibb Morton were destroyed completely and taken down. The intermediary side marble altars for the St. Anthony and St. Therese transepts were also destroyed, and replaced with wooden altars. The marble altar rail was destroyed, being seen as a "barrier between the priest and the laity." The original wooden pulpit was repurposed to form the current Novus Ordo altar, which was positioned at the centre of the church crossing, upon a removable and modular wooden podium. The front pews were removed and repurposed to be structured in a circular fashion surrounding the centre altar. The original sanctuary, no longer being used for mass, was converted into a storage room. For the conversion of the sanctuary space into a concert stage during performances, various risers were installed upon the original sanctuary steps. Around the anniversary of the parish, various enhancements, refurbishments, maintenance repairs, and maintenance went underway.

As of the time of writing, the last pastor of St. Joseph's parish was Fr. Robert Laroche , O.M.I., who replaced the former pastor, Fr. Jim Bleakley, O.M.I. After Fr. Robert was sent to Kenya in 2026, Fr. Richard Beaudette, O.M.I., the Vicar Provincial Superior of O.M.I. province Lacombe, was appointed as the interim parochial administrator of the church.
