= Blessed Sacrament Catholic Church (Ottawa) =

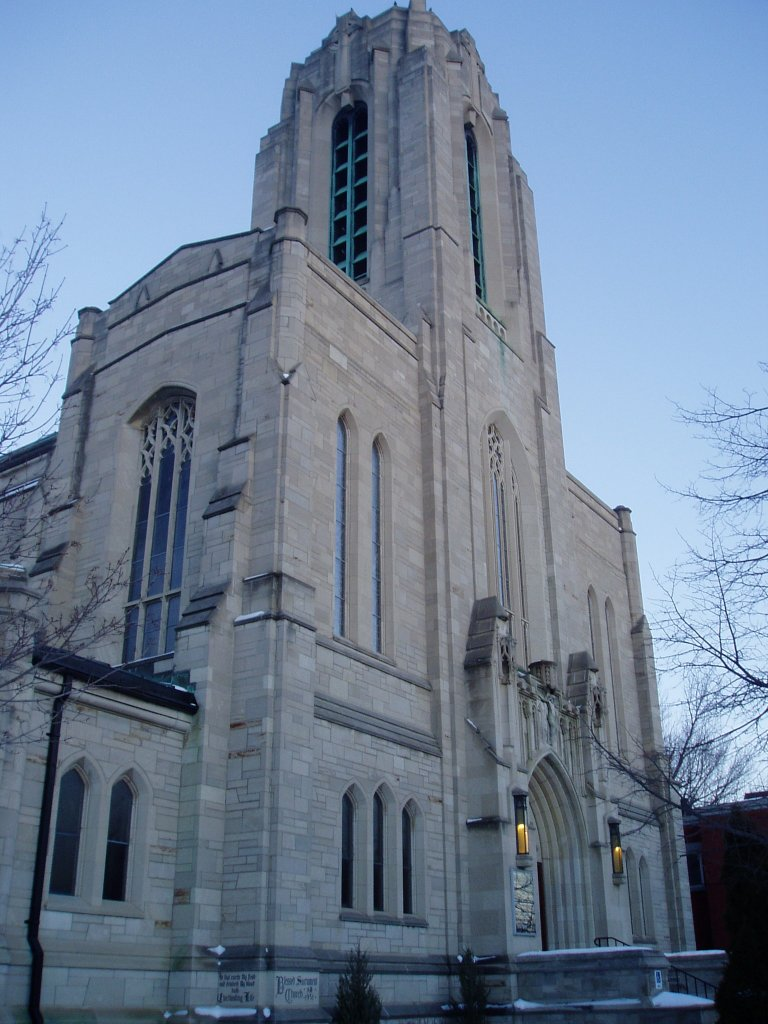
- Blessed Sacrament at 194 Fourth Avenue in the Glebe
- Blessed Sacrament Catholic Church
- 45.400047°N 75.693355°W
- Location: 194 Fourth Avenue; Ottawa, Ontario; K1S 2L6
- Denomination: Roman Catholic
- Website: Parish website

History
- Dedication: Blessed Sacrament

Administration
- Province: Canada
- Diocese: Archdiocese of Ottawa-Cornwall

Blessed Sacrament Catholic Church is a Catholic church in the Glebe neighbourhood of Ottawa, Ontario, Canada. The parish was founded on March 25, 1913, with the first building being a simple chapel. The current building, at 194 Fourth Avenue, was built in 1931.

== History ==
A brass memorial plaque was erected by the Blessed Sacrament parish in memory of parishioners and comrades of the overseas military forces of Canada. It was unveiled on Armistice Day (11 November) 1920 by Reverent John J. O'Gorman, P.P. When the current building opened in 1932, its plain design and lack of ornamentation caused local controversy because it seemed more Protestant than Catholic. However, the building later won plaudits for its modern design. Designed by J. Gibb Morton, it is considered an example of the Perpendicular Gothic style.

A memorial organ was unveiled on Christmas 1946 in memory of the parishioners who gave their lives in World War II.

As with Ottawa's other old churches, declining church attendance had caused problems for the church. For several years, it served as home to Ottawa's Hungarian Catholic community, though they left in 1997. Church attendance began to increase dramatically when Ottawa Archbishop Marcel Gervais appointed the popular priest Fr. Joseph (Joe) LeClair as pastor, who held the position until his arrest in 2012.

Fr Galen Bank was installed as pastor at Blessed Sacrament in July 2013. He and Associate Pastor Fr Francis Donnelly have followed in the footsteps of Blessed Sacrament's founder, Fr. O'Gorman, by reaching out to and working with the parish community.

The church's parish retains its original form. It covers the area north and west of the Rideau Canal, south of the Queensway and east of Booth Street.

== Gallery ==
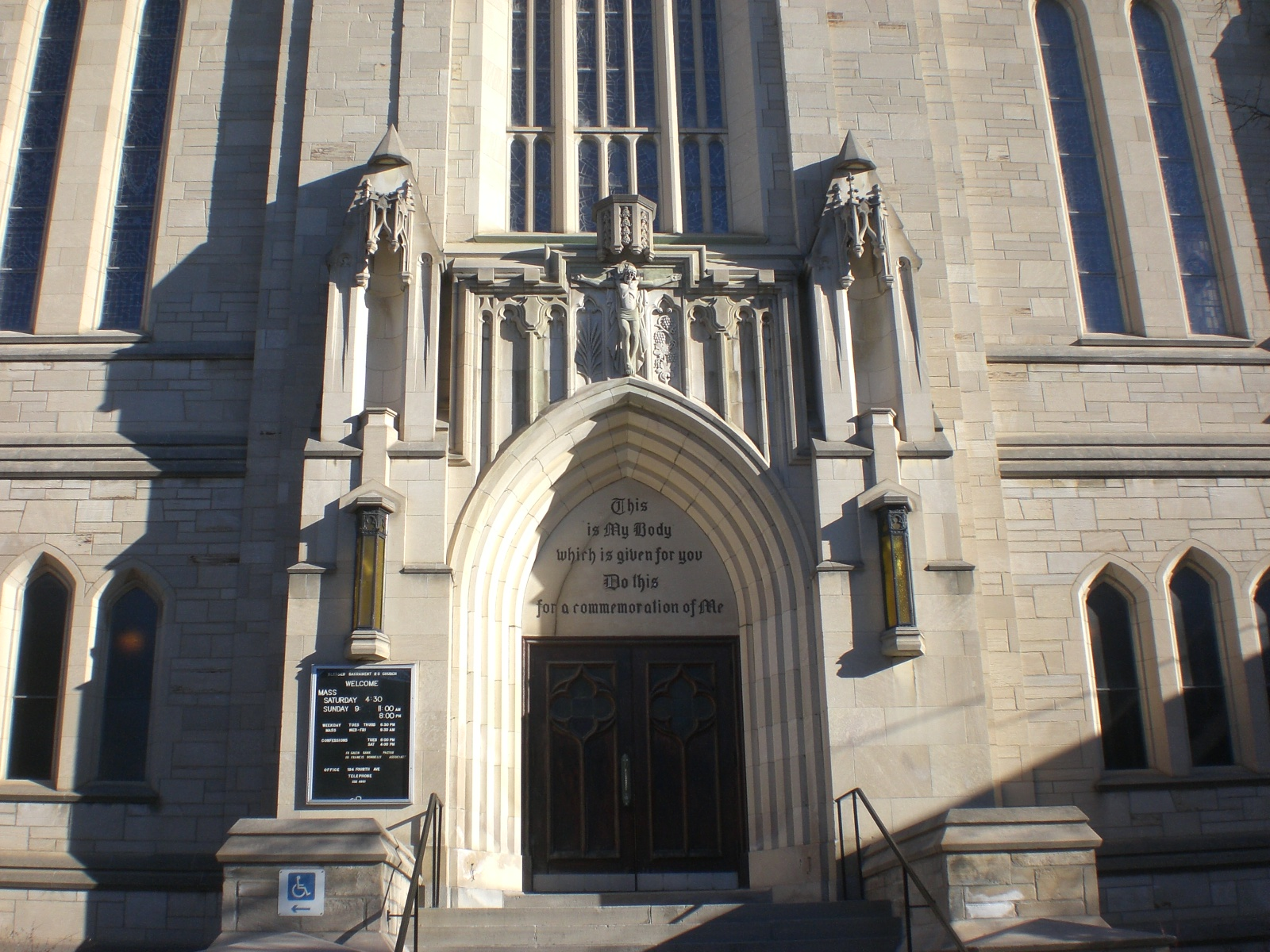
Main entrance

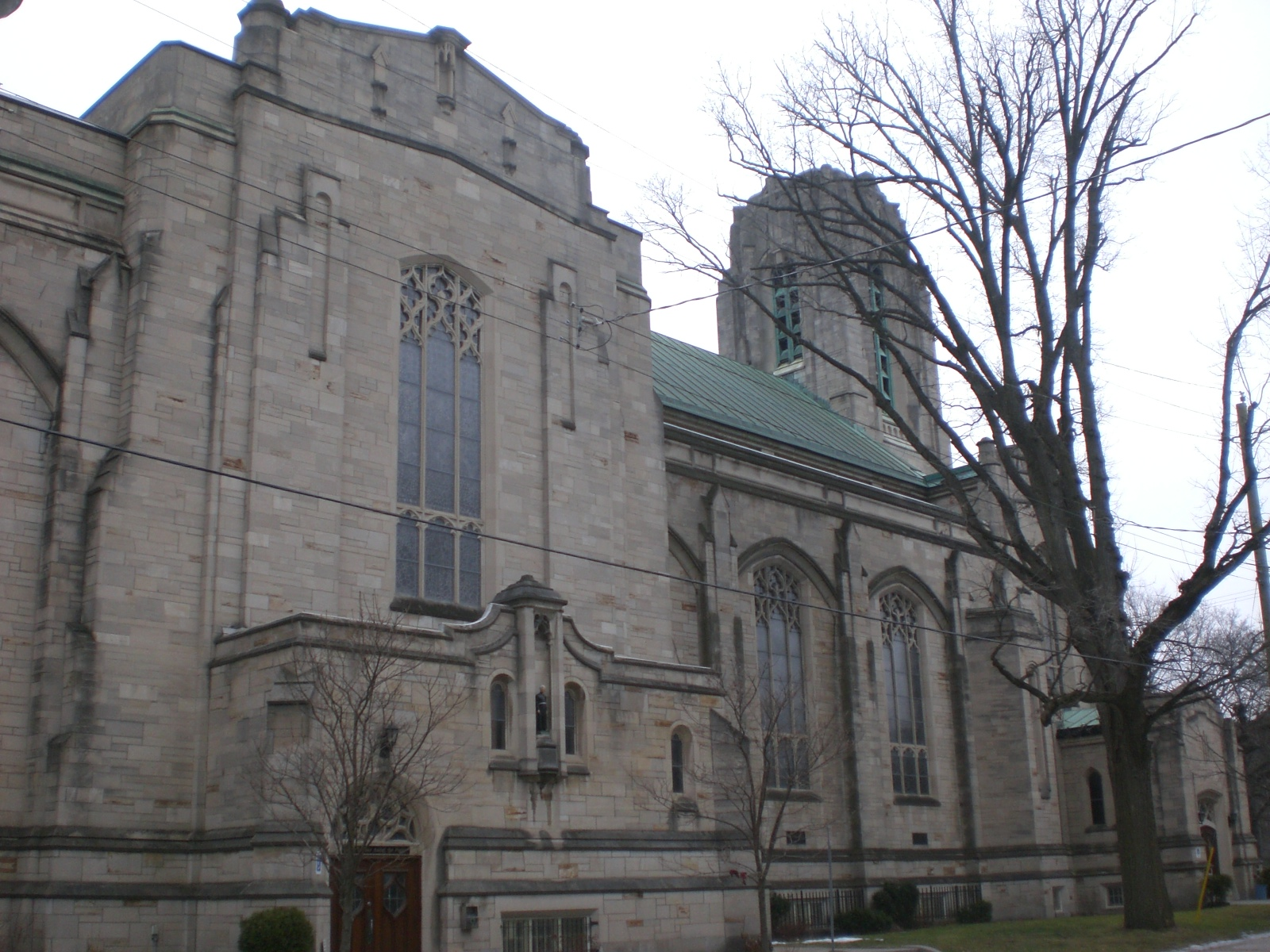
North side
