= Mary Bothwell =

Canadian opera singer

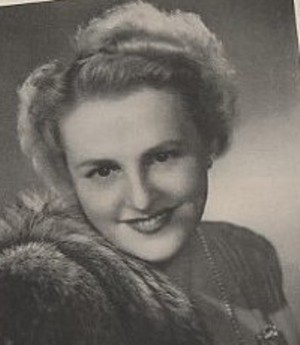
Mary Bothwell 1948

Mary Bothwell (November 28, 1900 – mid-1970s) was a Canadian classical vocalist and painter. As a singer she began her career as a contralto, but ultimately ended up performing soprano parts in the opera and concert repertoire.

== Early life and education ==
Bothwell was born in Hickson near Woodstock, Ontario, the daughter of Alexander Bothwell and Mary Thompson. She studied at the Canadian Academy of Music in Toronto where she was a voice student of Otto Morando and a piano student of Peter C. Kennedy. From 1920 to 1929 she performed as a contralto in opera and oratorio performances in Toronto and Buffalo, New York. In 1937 she went to Austria to study singing at the Mozarteum University of Salzburg. The following year she moved to New York City, where she was a pupil of Paul Althouse.

== Career ==
Bothwell made her recital debut in New York City at Town Hall on November 1, 1938, and continued to appear there until the early 1960s.

In 1947 she made her first European tour which included performances in Germany, the Netherlands, and England. That same year she was praised at the Scheveningen Festival for her portrayal of the Marschallin in Der Rosenkavalier. She was also celebrated for her portrayal of Isolde in Tristan und Isolde, a role she notably performed with the BBC Symphony Orchestra under conductor Adrian Boult in 1948. She performed on radio in New York City, Paris, London, and Basel. Among her recordings for Royale are An Hour of Lieder:

- Hugo Wolf Sung by Mary Bothwell (1310)
- An Hour of Concert Songs (1318)
- Bless This House (1538)
- Richard Strauss Album (4069)

Bothwell was elected president of the Canadian Women's Club of New York City in 1958. During her term as president she encouraged the careers of young Canadian performers.

Bothwell became known also for her paintings of flowers. "Wild Flowers of Switzerland", 36 botanical studies in oil by Mary Bothwell was exhibited for the first time at the Horticultural Society of New York on April 18, 1971.
