= Douglas Clarke (conductor) =

British conductor

Douglas Clarke (4 April 1893 – 14 November 1962) was an English organist, conductor, composer and academic. For most of his career he lived in Canada, where in Montreal he was an academic at McGill University and conductor of the Montreal Orchestra.

== Life ==
Clarke was born in Reading, Berkshire in 1893. During the First World War he was a commissioned officer in the Royal Navy. He became a fellow of the Royal College of Organists in 1920. At the University of Cambridge he obtained BMus and MA degrees; he was appointed organ scholar at Christ's College, Cambridge in 1923.

In 1927 he moved to Canada, where in Winnipeg he was a choral conductor, and organist at Holy Trinity Church. In 1930 he became dean of the Faculty of Music at McGill University in Montreal. He was conductor of the Montreal Orchestra from its formation in 1930 until its dissolution in 1941; during this time, the orchestra introduced works by British composers, and works from the standard repertoire not previously heard in Montreal.

He retired from the university in 1955; returning to England, he lived in Warwick where he was organist of St Mary's Church. He died in Warwick in 1962.

== Compositions ==
His compositions Three Pieces were performed by the Montreal Orchestra in 1931, and Piece for Full Orchestra in 1936. Several works for choir have been published.
