= Frederick Herbert Torrington =

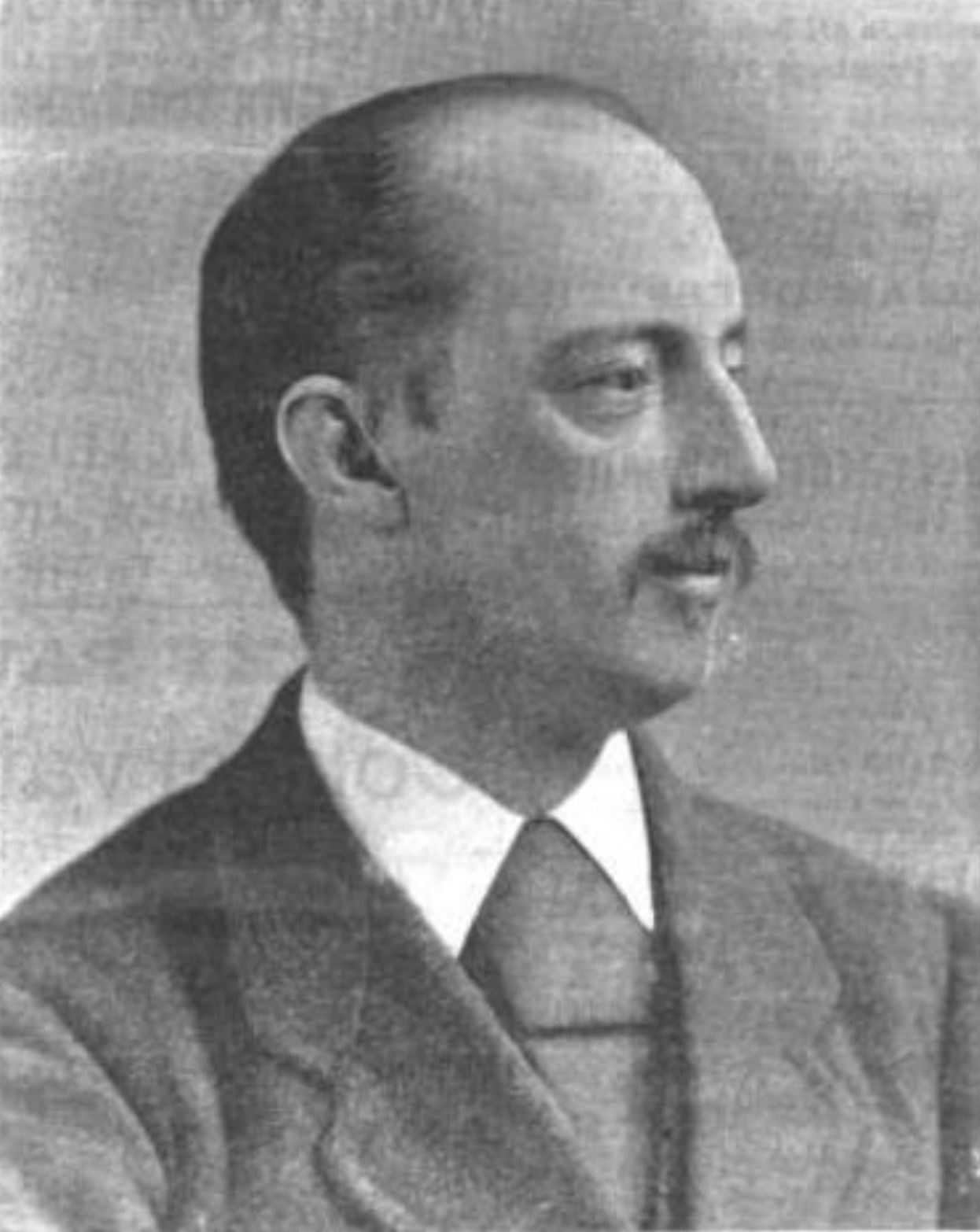
Frederick Herbert Torrington

Frederick Herbert Torrington (20 October 1836 – 20 November 1917) was an English-born Canadian conductor, organist, violinist, music educator, and administrator. From 1873-1894 he was the principal conductor of Toronto Philharmonic Society. In 1888 he founded the Toronto College of Music; serving as its director until his death in 1917.

== Life and career ==
The son of James and Jane Torrington, Frederick Herbert Torrington was born in Dudley, England on 20 October 1836. He began private music lessons at the age of eight, and studied organ, piano, music theory, and choral music for four years with James Fitzgerald in Kidderminster. His first professional assignment was as choirmaster and organist in Bewdley; serving at St Ann's Church beginning at the age of 16.

In 1857 Torrington immigrated to Canada when he was appointed at St James St Methodist Church in Montreal. He performed in the music festival given for Edward, Prince of Wales upon his visit to Montreal in 1860. He left his post in Montreal in 1869 when be became the organist and choirmaster at King's Chapel in Boston. While working at that church he concurrently taught piano and organ on the faculty of the New England Conservatory. He also was a violinist in the Harvard Musical Association which was led by conductor Carl Zerrahn.

Torrington left Boston when he became organist and choirmaster at Metropolitan United Church; a position he held from 1873-1907. He concurrently served as the conductor of the Toronto Philharmonic Society from 1873-1894. In 1888 he founded the Toronto College of Music (later merged into The Royal Conservatory of Music); remaining its director until his death nearly 30 years later. He earned a doctorate in music from the University of Toronto in 1902. His final organist post was at High Park Methodist Church where he served from 1907 until his death in Toronto on 20 November 1917.
