= Metropolitan United Church =

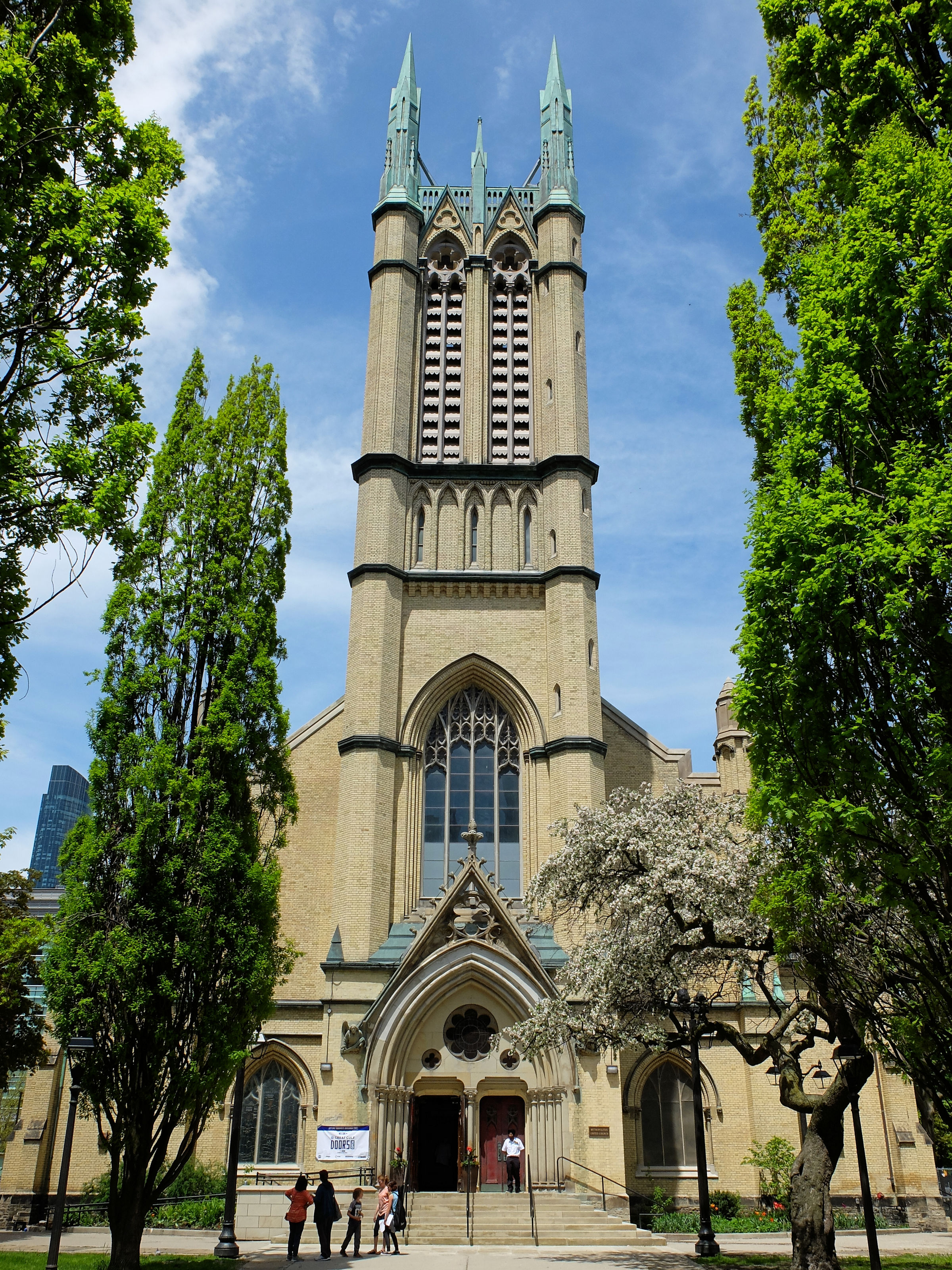
- The church's southern façade in 2019
- Metropolitan United Church
- 43.6539°N 79.3767°W
- Location: Queen Street East; Toronto, Ontario, Canada
- Denomination: United Church of Canada
- Previous denomination: Methodist Church
- Website: www.metunited.ca

History
- Former name(s): Metropolitan Wesleyan Methodist Church (1872–1884); Metropolitan Methodist Church (1884–1925)
- Founded: 1818; 208 years ago

Architecture
- Architect(s): Henry Langley; J. Gibb Morton
- Style: Gothic Revival
- Years built: 1870–1872; 1928–1929

Clergy
- Pastor(s): Jason Francis Meyers; Mark Aitchison

Ontario Heritage Act
- Designated: 2007

Metropolitan United Church is a historic Gothic Revival church in downtown Toronto, Ontario, Canada. One of the largest and most prominent churches of the United Church of Canada, it is located at 56 Queen Street East, between Bond and Church streets, in the city's Garden District.

The congregation was established in 1818, and the present church, designed by architect Henry Langley, was completed in 1872 as Metropolitan Wesleyan Methodist Church. It acquired its present name following the formation of the United Church of Canada in 1925, hosting the denomination's first General Council that year. Largely destroyed by fire in 1928, the church was rebuilt in 1929, incorporating portions of the original structure, including its tower and principal façade. The property was designated under Part IV of the Ontario Heritage Act in 2007.

== History ==
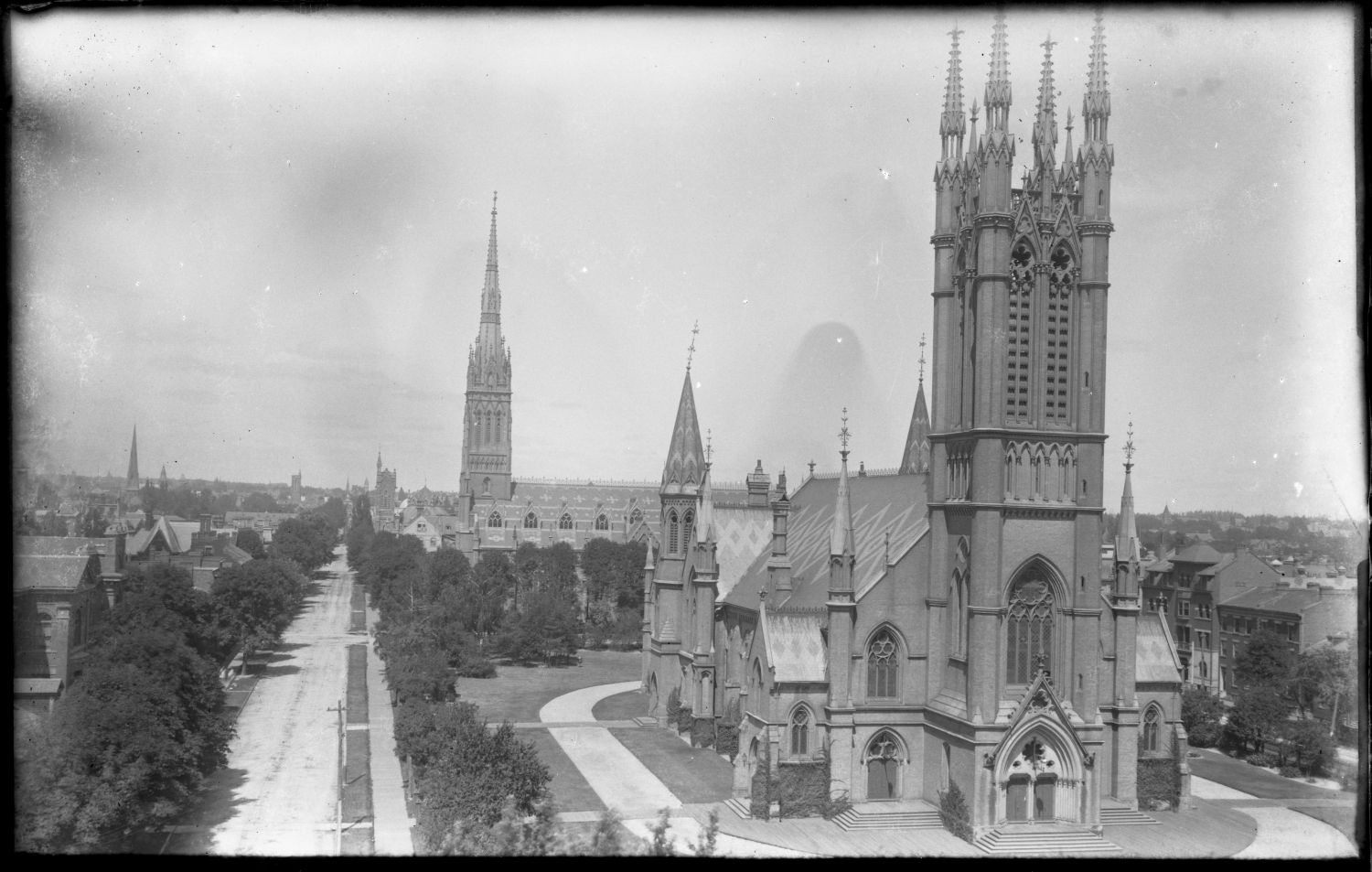
The church in 1896

The congregation traces its origins to 1818, when a small Methodist chapel was established on King Street in York, now Toronto. As the congregation grew, a new site was acquired on Adelaide Street in 1831. The Newgate Methodist Episcopal Church, a Georgian-style building with a capacity of approximately 1,000 worshippers, opened on the site in 1833.

In 1868, the church trustees purchased a block of land at McGill Square, bounded by Queen, Church, Shuter and Bond streets. A new church, designed by architect Henry Langley in the Gothic Revival style, was constructed between 1870 and 1872. On 24 August 1870, the cornerstone of the new church was laid by Egerton Ryerson, a former pastor of the congregation's earlier church on Adelaide Street. Ryerson subsequently served as a member and trustee of the church for many years, and his funeral was held at the church in 1882. Dedicated as Metropolitan Wesleyan Methodist Church in 1872, the new building had seating for 1,800 worshippers, with additional accommodation during major services. Its interior featured a central pulpit, side aisles, galleries on three sides and a large chancel accommodating a choir of approximately 300 singers. The church became known as the "Cathedral of Methodism" in Toronto.

In 1922, a 23-bell carillon was installed in the church tower. Three years later, Metropolitan Methodist Church became Metropolitan United Church following the formation of the United Church of Canada through the union of the Methodist and Congregational churches and most Presbyterian congregations. The church hosted the denomination's inaugural General Council in 1925.

In 1928, a fire destroyed most of the church, leaving the tower, portions of the south façade and parts of the entrance porches standing. The congregation temporarily relocated to Massey Hall while considering whether to rebuild or amalgamate with another United Church congregation. It ultimately decided to remain on the site, and a new church, designed by architect J. Gibb Morton, was constructed on the original foundations, with financial assistance from the Massey family. The rebuilt church opened in December 1929, with a seating capacity of approximately 900. Its interior departed from the original Methodist arrangement, incorporating a nave, side aisles, transepts and chancel in a more conventional Gothic church plan.

A new five-manual pipe organ, comprising approximately 7,200 pipes, was installed in 1930. During the 1930s and 1940s, the church expanded its musical activities, including its choirs, concert series and Silver Band.

During the twentieth century, Metropolitan United Church developed social service programs for the surrounding community and became known for its music and radio ministry. Following declining attendance during the 1960s, a report presented to the church trustees in 1970 recommended demolishing the building and selling the property. The congregation rejected the proposal, voting to retain the church.

The congregation underwent a period of renewal during the 1970s and 1980s. On 16 May 1999, it voted to become an Affirming Ministry, formally welcoming people regardless of sexual orientation to participate in its worship and ministry. The church continues to operate community outreach programs alongside its religious and musical activities.

The church was included on the inaugural City of Toronto Inventory of Heritage Properties in June 1973. On 20 November 2007, Toronto City Council enacted By-law No. 1250-2007, designating the property under Part IV of the Ontario Heritage Act for its architectural, historical and contextual significance. The designation recognizes the building's combination of nineteenth-century Gothic Revival architecture and twentieth-century Neo-Gothic reconstruction, as well as its association with architects Henry Langley and J. Gibb Morton. It also identifies the church's historical importance to Canadian Methodism and its longstanding role in the religious and social life of downtown Toronto.

== Architecture ==
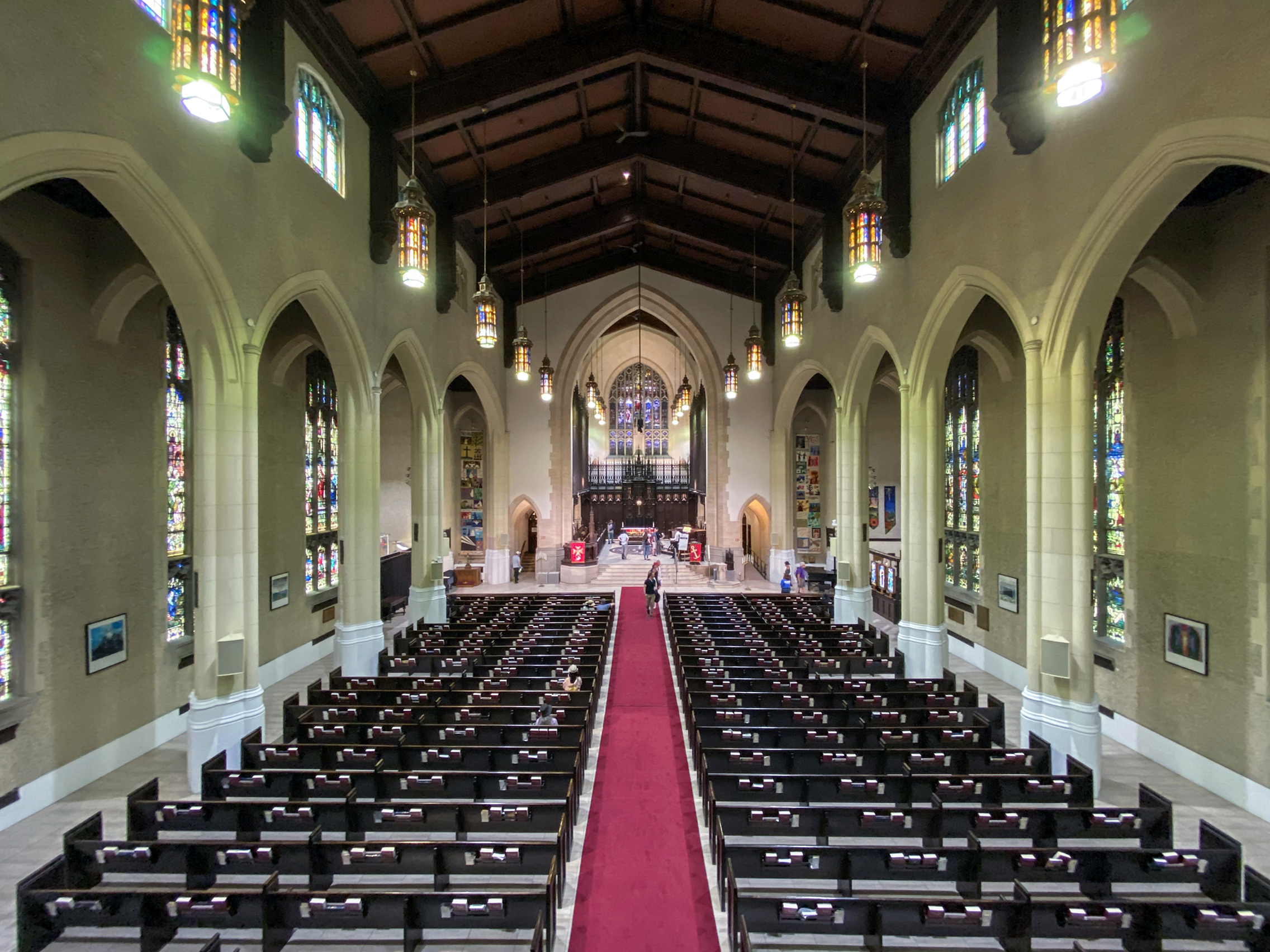
View of the church's altar (Note: The church uses the term sanctuary to refer to the nave)

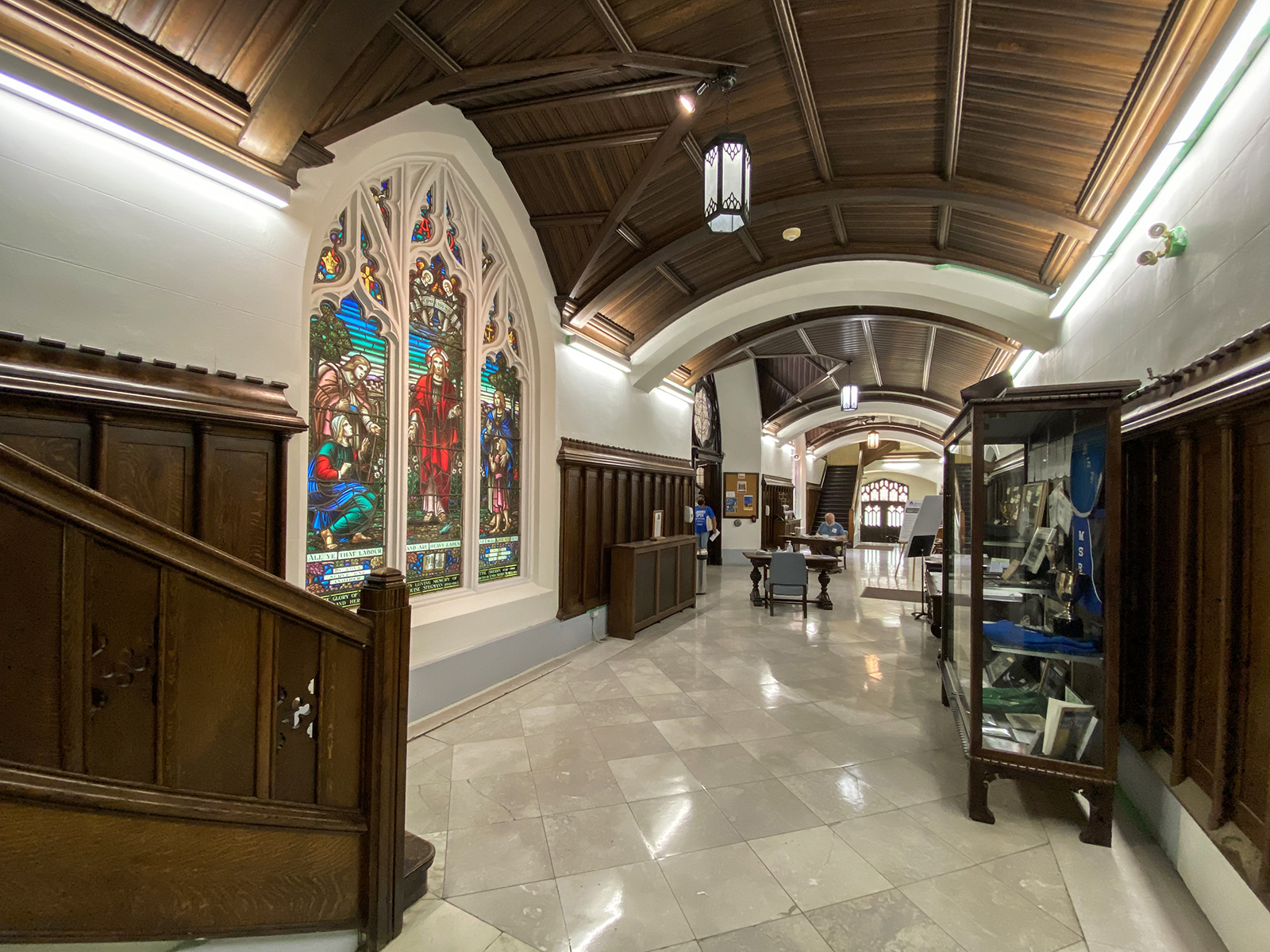
Entrance corridor

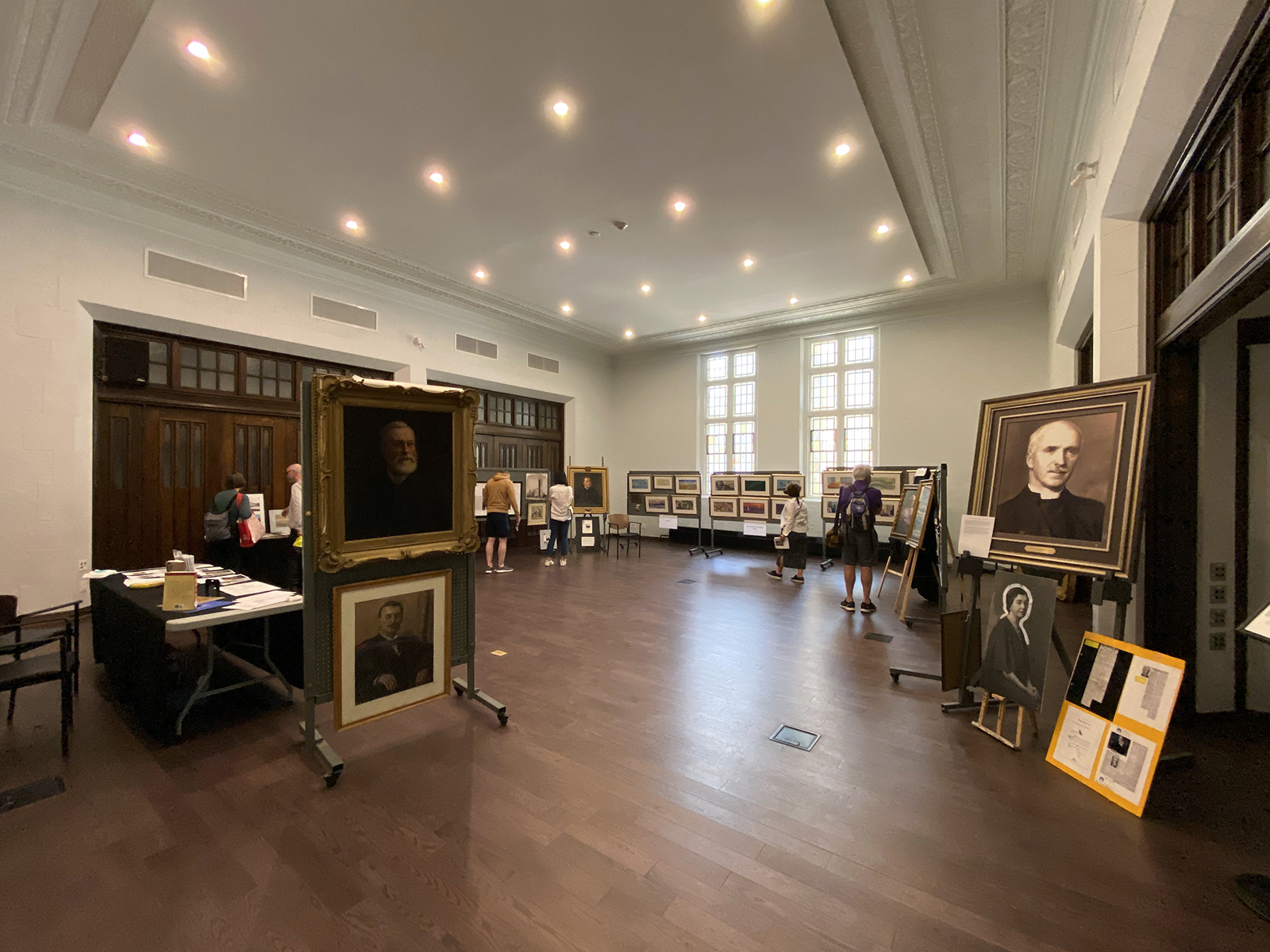
Gallery

Designed by Henry Langley, who was to draw "the ubiquitous cloak of decorous gothicism over the face of Ontario in the 1870s", the church became known as

the "cathedral of Methodism...a monument to ... energy, magnetism and culture....No church in Toronto has such great advantages of position....The handsome grounds of this church form one of the finest spaces in this city....The entire building is of white brick, with abundant cut stone dressing. It is a modernized form of the French thirteenth century Gothic, with nave, transepts and choir.

The church's ecclesiastical neighbours are St. Michael's Cathedral Basilica and the Cathedral Church of St. James, and the trio of similarly designed churches are a striking Christian witness adjacent to Canada's financial hub. The church's website describes the building in customary evangelical Protestant terms, regarding the nave rather than the chancel area as its "sanctuary".

=== Carillon ===
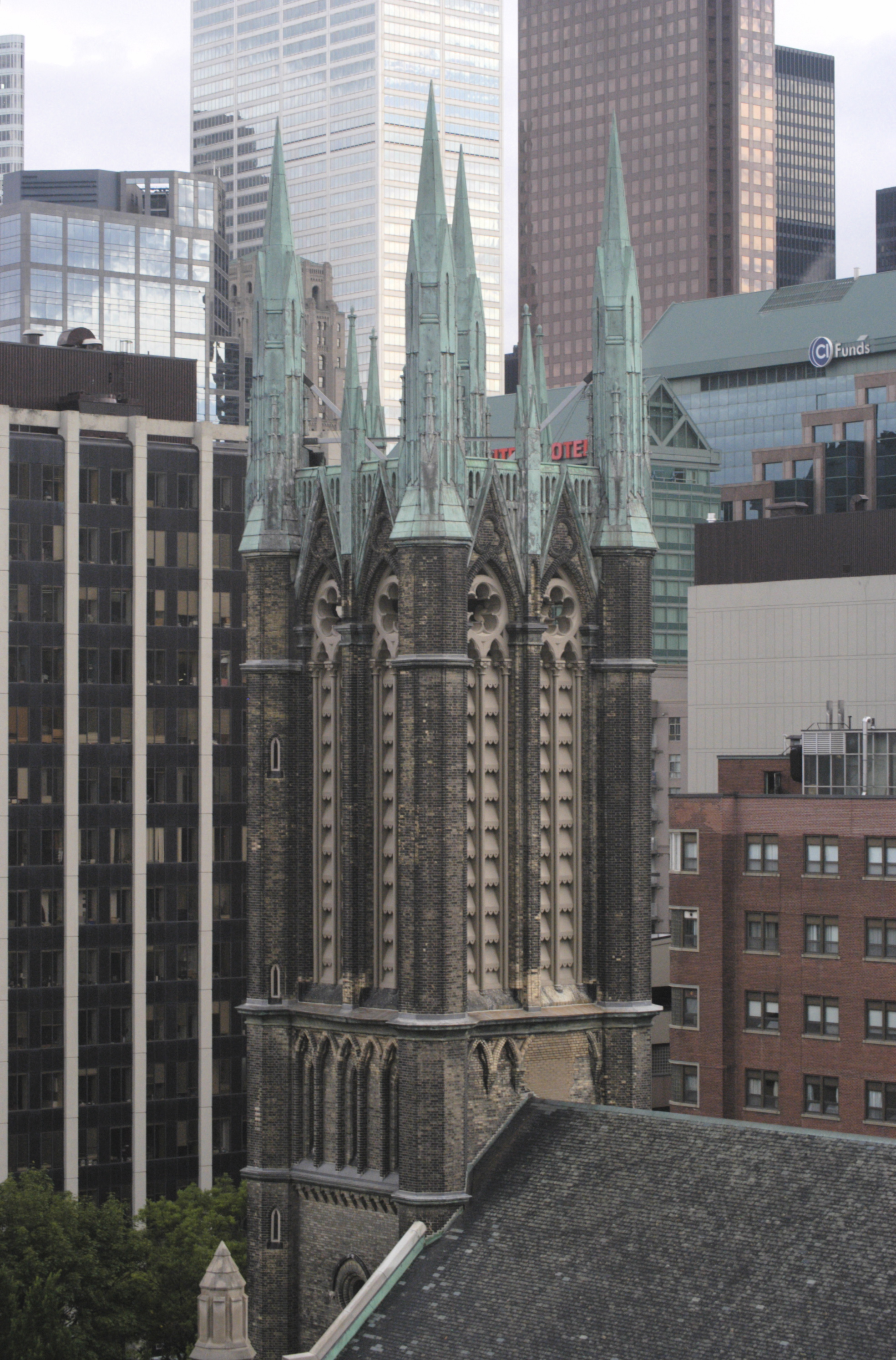
The church's tower houses a carillon

A very important part of the church is the carillon. A traditional carillon is a set of 23 or more bells which are played from a mechanical keyboard. The collection of bells at the Metropolitan United Church has been growing since April 2, 1922, when Chester D. Massey dedicated 23 bells in memory of his wife. These original 23 bells, cast by Gillett & Johnston in Croydon, England, are inscribed with the message "May the spirit of the Lord reach the heart of every one where the sound of these bells is heard." In 1960, Charles W. Drury and his wife donated twelve smaller bells, and by 1971, the collection was brought to a total of 54 bells.

When the church was first built in 1872, it was designed to accommodate a future carillon. The tower was designed to support the addition of bells and their immense weight (over forty four thousand pounds), by having seven-foot thick walls at the base which taper as they go up. At the top of the tower is a bell chamber open to the outside through which the carillon music can be heard.

=== Organ ===
The church also had Canada’s largest pipe organ (Casavant Frères 8726 Opus 1367) installed in 1930 following the fire which destroyed the previous organ. This instrument plays an important part in leading the church choir and ceremony every week. When it was first installed, there was a weekly recital which was widely known in the neighbourhood, and which received a great deal of recognition in the local papers. These two instruments, the organ and carillon, are an important part of the church’s image and are enjoyed wherever they are heard and especially by the patients of the St. Michael's Hospital.

== Clergy and staff ==
=== Clergy ===
- The Reverend Jason Francis Meyers, Minister of Worship and Faith Formation
- The Reverend Mark Aitchison, Minister of Pastoral Care

=== Carilloneurs ===
- 1922–1926: F. Percival Price
- 1926–1928: John Skillicorn
- 1928–1930: J. Leland Richardson
- 1930–1932: Edmund Milroy
- 1932–1936: Sidney Giles
- 1936–1941: Edmund Milroy
- 1941–1962: Stanley James
- 1962–1997: James B. Slater
- 1997–2016: Gerald Martindale
- 2016–2023: Roy Lee
- 2023–present: Elisa Tersigni

=== Organists and choir directors ===
Herbert Austin Fricker served as the church's organist and choir director from 1917 to 1943

- 1872–1873: Thomas Turvey
- 1873–1907: Frederick Herbert Torrington
- 1907–1913: H. A. Wheeldon
- 1913–1917: T. J. Palmer
- 1917–1943: Herbert Austin Fricker
- 1943–1946: John Reymes-King
- 1946–1952: S. Drummond Wolff
- 1952–1960: John Sidgwick
- 1960: Rowland Pack
- 1961–1967: Paul Murray
- 1967–1986: Melville Cook
- 1986–2022: Patricia Wright
- 2022–present: Jonathan Oldengarm

==== Wayne C. Vance Organ Scholars ====
- 2021–2024: Joshua Duncan Lee
- 2024–present: Ethan Duan
- 2024–present: Sean Lee

== See also ==
- List of carillons in Canada
- List of oldest buildings and structures in Toronto
- List of United Church of Canada churches in Toronto
