= Frederic Archer =

British musician

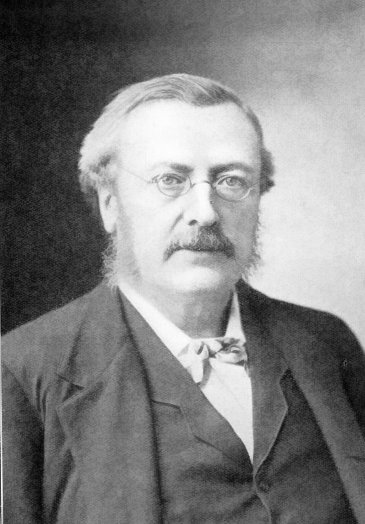
Frederic Archer

Frederic Archer (16 June 1838 – 22 October 1901) was a British composer, conductor and organist, born in Oxford. He moved to the US in 1880, where he established the Pittsburgh Symphony Orchestra.

== Education and UK career ==
From the age of eleven he was a chorister at All Saints, Margaret Street, and afterwards studied at Leipzig. He held various musical positions in England and Scotland, including organist at the Panopticon in Leicester Square (succeeding Edmund Chipp), Merton College Oxford and (from 1878) the first organist at the Alexandra Palace in London, where his many public recitals on the original and then on the restored organ (post fire) drew large crowds. He conducted the Glasgow Select Choir between 1878 and 1880, arranging part songs based on Scotch airs for the choir. During this period he was also an Examiner at Glasgow University.

== New York and Pittsburgh ==
In 1880 he moved to the United States, becoming organist of Plymouth Church in Brooklyn, New York, and a year later at the Episcopal Church of the Incarnation in Manhattan. Archer was later appointed conductor of the Boston, Massachusetts Oratorio Society, director of Carnegie Music Hall in Pittsburgh, Pennsylvania, and in 1899 organist of the Church of the Ascension in Pittsburgh. He gave many organ recitals across America, including over 220 at Carnegie Hall. In 1896, he established the Pittsburgh Symphony Orchestra, which he conducted for two years before passing the baton on to Victor Herbert.

== Author and composer ==
In 1883 Archer founded a music journal, The Keynote, which for a time he edited, and also published several books and numerous organ compositions. These include the Grand Fantasia in F, the Concert Variations, March Triomphale and many other pieces for the organ. He published a cantata, King Witlaf's Drinking Horn, setting Longfellow, in 1857. There is also the Duo Concertante for flute and piano, solo piano works such as the Three Impromptus and Two Gavottes, and various songs and part songs. For Novello he wrote The Organ: a theoretical and practical treatise (1875). A Complete Method for the American Reed Organ followed in 1889, published by Schirmer.

== Death ==
Archer died of cancer at his home in Pittsburgh on 22 October 1901, aged 63. He, his wife, and daughter rest in apparently unmarked graves at Pittsburgh's Homewood Cemetery.

== Bibliography ==
- Archer, Frederic (1875). The Organ. London: Novello & Co. OCLC 80376458.
- Archer, Frederic (1876). Bedford Grand Organ Recital. London: W. Mallalieu. OCLC 53785240.
- Archer, Frederic (1889). Method for American Reed-Organ. New York: G. Schirmer. OCLC 77860393.
