= Canadian Academy of Music =

Conservatory in Toronto, Canada (1911–1924)

Coordinates: 43°40′4.19″N 79°24′17.68″W

The Canadian Academy of Music was a Canadian music conservatory in Toronto, Ontario, located at 12–14 Spadina Road. It was founded as the Columbian Conservatory of Music of Music, Toronto in 1911 but changed its name in 1912. It was a school for higher education in music until merging with the Toronto Conservatory of Music in 1924.

== History ==
=== Founding as Columbian Conservatory of Music ===
The Canadian Academy of Music (CAM) was founded by Albert Gooderham and his wife, Mary Reford Gooderham, in 1911. The Gooderhams financed the school out of their own personal fortune, and Albert served as the school's only president during its 13-year-long history. Organist Peter C. Kennedy was appointed CAM's first director, and he played an instrumental role in the organization of the school when it was first established. When it opened in September 1911, CAM was originally known as the Columbian Conservatory of Music (CCM), and it used this name during its first year of operation. The school first operated out of the Heintzman building on Yonge St when it opened in 1911.

CAM originally served as the Toronto branch of the CCM chain of music conservatories; a group of music conservatories originally from the United States that offered correspondence courses in music from branches in Chicago, St. Louis, Dallas, and Portland, Oregon. Leaders of this group of music schools included William Smythe Babcock Mathews (chief editor of its publications), Frederick Hobart (superintendent of instruction), and Frederic Lillebridge. This chain of music schools expanded into Canada in 1908 when it opened a branch in Vancouver. As a CCM conservatory, CAM originally used the curriculum and program designed for use across the CCM chain of music conservatories.

=== Canadian Academy of Music ===
In 1912 the school was renamed the Canadian Academy of Music (CAM) at the time that it moved to larger new premises at 12–14 Spadina Road. At the same time the school absorbed the Metropolitan School of Music (founded 1893) in Parkdale, Toronto; creating a Parkdale branch to the school. The school's organization became independent from CCM, and Gooderham reworked the organization towards building an international faculty that could rival the quality of education found in European music conservatories.

Albert Gooderham personally recruited conductor Luigi von Kunits to join CAM's faculty. Kunitz was a highly influential teacher at CAM, and served as the head of its violin department. He later played an instrumental in the founding of the Toronto Symphony Orchestra in 1922; serving as the orchestra's first director. By 1917 the quality of the education at CAM was extremely high; to the point that it rivaled the Toronto Conservatory of Music (TCM, now The Royal Conservatory of Music, RCM) and directly competed with it in attracting top students. The school awarded both associate (ACAM) and licentiate (LCAM) diplomas.

In 1918 violist Alfred Bruce succeeded Kennedy as managing director of CAM. That same year the Toronto College of Music (TCOM) was merged into the school; an event precipitated by the death of TCOM's founder, Frederick Herbert Torrington, in 1917. In 1922 Frank Welsman was appointed head music director of CAM. Wellsman had previously joined CAM's staff in 1918 after leaving the faculty of the TCM, and many of his top students left with him to study at CAM at that time.

The TCM's director, Augustus Stephen Vogt, decided to pursue purchasing CAM in order to buy out the TCM's main competitor. CAM was purchased by the TCM on May 23, 1924 for price $115,000.00. The schools were amalgamated soon after.

== Notable alumni ==
- Mary Bothwell
- Ruth Anna Fisher
- Rose Goldblatt
- Leslie Holmes

== Notable faculty ==
- Arthur Friedheim
- W. O. Forsyth
- Albert Ham
- Luigi von Kunits
- Ernest MacMillan
- Frank Welsman
