= Jeanne Dusseau =

Canadian singer

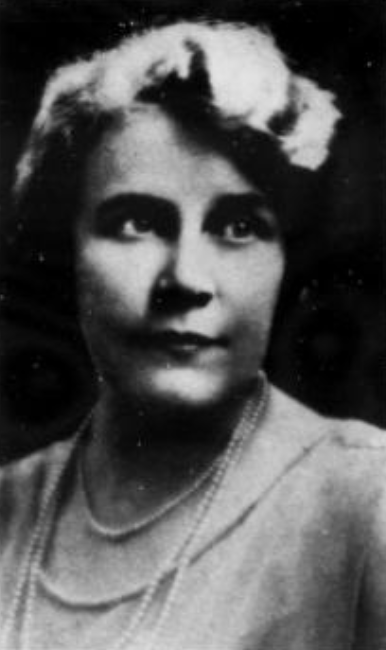
- Jeanne Dusseau, from a 1929 publication
- Born: Ruth Cleveland Thom; 2 February 1893; Scotland, U.K.
- Died: 1979 (aged 85–86); Washington, D.C., U.S.
- Occupation: Soprano singer

Jeanne Dusseau (2 February 1893 – February 1979), born Ruth Cleveland Thom, was a Canadian soprano singer born in Scotland. She sang with the Chicago Opera for the 1921–1922 season, toured Canada through much of the 1920s, and performed with the Sadler's Wells Opera from 1936 to 1940.

== Early life and education ==
Dusseau was born in Scotland and raised in Toronto, the daughter of James Thom and Charlotte Christine MacDonald Thom. She trained as a singer with M. M. Stevenson, Atherton Furlong, and Giuseppe Carboni.

== Career ==
Dusseau was a soprano. She toured across Canada in 1928, singing in folk music festivals supported by the National Museum of Canada and the Association of Canadian Clubs. She appeared at the CPR Festivals, music events sponsored by Canadian Pacific Railway, between 1927 and 1931. In 1929, she sang with the Toronto Symphony and was a soloist in a Toronto performance of Bach's St. Matthew Passion. In 1930 she sang French-Canadian chansons on a national radio broadcast, and was voted one of Canada's favorite radio performers. She was honored at a reception in Toronto in 1934.

Beyond Canada, Dusseau sang with the Chicago Opera in its 1921–1922 season. While there, she appeared as Ninette in the world premiere of The Love of Three Oranges (1921). She first performed in London at Wigmore Hall in 1929, and sang in New York, Boston, and Louisiana in 1932. In 1936, she was a soloist with the Cincinnati Symphony Orchestra. She was with the Sadler's Wells Opera (SWO) from 1936 to 1940. Her repertoire with the SWO included Giuletta in The Tales of Hoffmann, Leonore in Fidelio, Rosalinde in Die Fledermaus, and the title roles in Aida, Madama Butterfly, and Tosca.

Dusseau returned to North America during World War II. She taught voice in New York City and Washington, D.C. in her later years. One of her students was Canadian soprano Frances James.

== Personal life ==
Dusseau married Canadian baritone Victor Lambert Dusseau in 1919. They had two sons, Peter and Michael, and two daughters: Helene and Rita, who sang under the name Terry Swope. Her husband died in 1974, and Dusseau died in 1979, in her eighties, in Washington, D.C.
