= Birmingham Philharmonic Orchestra =

The Birmingham Philharmonic Orchestra is a non-professional orchestra based in Birmingham, England.

== History ==
The orchestra was founded by Ernest Powell in 1941, when a group of musicians gathered to perform Handel's Messiah. The group carried on and grew to become the South Birmingham Orchestra, performing concerts to support wartime charities. By 1946, E. David Ludlow had become the orchestra's conductor, and the present name was adopted in 1949.

Kenneth Page took charge from 1959 after David Ludlow's death. From this point the repertoire became more adventurous and ambitious, with performing standards having to improve to keep step. The high point of this period was a performance of Mahler's Symphony of a Thousand at the Royal Albert Hall in 1984. In 1986, Kenneth Page resigned as conductor and was succeeded by Robin Page (no relation), who did much to maintain the already high standard that had been attained. He was succeeded in 1994 by Michael Lloyd of English National Opera, who is the current Music Director.

The BPO typically performs 12-15 concerts each year in Birmingham and the surrounding area. Guest conductors and professional soloists are also engaged on a regular basis, and a professional leader is usually engaged. Strong links are maintained with the Royal Birmingham Conservatoire, where the orchestra performs, and with the City of Birmingham Symphony Orchestra.

== Music directors ==
- Ernest Powell (1941–1946)
- E. David Ludlow (1946–1959)
- Kenneth Page (1959–1986)
- Robin Page (1986–1994)
- Michael Lloyd (1994–2025)
- Jack Lovell-Huckle (2026- )

== Patrons ==
- Sir Adrian Boult (1960–1983)
- Sir Malcolm Arnold (1983–2006)
- Peter Donohoe (2007- )
- Julian Lloyd Webber (2021- )
