= Welsman =

Welsman is a surname. Notable people with the surname include:

- Carol Welsman (born 1960), vocalist and pianist
- Frank Welsman (1873–1952), conductor
- Jennifer Welsman, Canadian ballet dancer
- John Welsman (born 1955), Canadian composer

== See also ==
- Toronto Symphony Orchestra (Welsman)
