= Adaskin =

Adaskin is a surname. Notable people with the surname include:

- Frances Adaskin (1900–2001), Canadian pianist
- Harry Adaskin (1901–1994), Canadian violinist, academic, and radio broadcaster
- Murray Adaskin (1906–2002), Canadian violinist, composer, conductor, and teacher
