= Adele Armin =

- Born: Adele Ruth Armin; December 2, 1945; Morris, Manitoba, Canada
- Died: June 26, 2022 (aged 76); Oshawa, Ontario, Canada
- Education: Indiana University; University of Toronto
- Occupation: Violinist
- Children: 3

Adele Ruth Armin (December 2, 1945 – June 26, 2022) was a Canadian classical violinist. She began playing the violin from the age of four, and was a member of the Toronto Symphony Orchestra for 20 years starting from late 1968. Armin was a guest soloist for multiple orchestras in Canada. She was a member of the National Youth Orchestra of Canada for several summers and she was the concert mistress of the Toronto Philharmonic Orchestra in 1989.

== Early life ==
Armin was born in Morris, Manitoba, on December 2, 1945. She was the daughter of Martha Armin and Jay Armin, the music director of the Herman Collegiate Institute, Windsor, Ontario. Armin had three brothers, who all played string instruments in the Armin String Quartette across Canadian schools. At age four, she began playing the violin under the tutelage of her father, and she was a member of the National Youth Orchestra of Canada for several summers. From 1958 to 1961, Armin was sent by her father to study at the Detroit Symphony Orchestra with Carl Chase, and continued until she was of university age. She then studied with Josef Gingold between 1962 and 1965 and János Starker and Menahem Pressler (chamber music) at Indiana University and with the violinist Lorand Fenyves at the Faculty of Music of the University of Toronto from 1968 to 1970.

== Career ==
During the early part of her career, Armin won the Grand Prize at the Canadian National Exhibition, performed on CBC Radio on programs such as Youth and Music and television and participated in the CBC Talent Festival, finishing runner-up in the 1969 strings competition. She made two tours of Canada with the Armin String Quartette. After the conductor Karel Ančerl agreed to conduct the Toronto Symphony Orchestra in late 1968, Armin was the soloist in the Violin Concerto No. 2 (Prokofiev). This marked her professional debut and she was a guest soloist for the orchestra on a number of occasions. She remained with the orchestra for 20 years.

In April 1969, Armin was awarded a $1,000 Aline Hector Perrier bursary for string players under the age of 26 at the Montreal Symphony Orchestra young people's concerts competition, and was awarded a Canada Council grant to enable the extension of her studies by a year. That same year, she was selected to be Lauréate des auditions des matinees symphoniques. In 1970, she came second in the CGC Talent Festival and earned another Canada Council grant, and played Johann Sebastian Bach's Sonata No. 2 for Violin Solo in A minor at the Vancouver Art Gallery in December 1970. Armin came under the management of the National Concert Bureau in 1971 and participated in the International Tchaikovsky Competition, Moscow in the same year. She received a bursary from the Canada Council, won the bronze prize at the Geneva International Music Competition in 1970, played at the Lincoln Center, New York City, and won the first annual Cosmopolitan Violin Competition in New York in April 1971.

She was a guest soloist with the National Youth Orchestra of Canada, the St. Catharines Symphony Orchestra, the Hamilton Philharmonic Orchestra, the Niagara Falls Philharmonic Orchestra, the Cosmopolitan Young People's Symphony Orchestra, the Atlantic Symphony Orchestra, the Brantford Symphony Orchestra, the Etobicoke Philharmonic Orchestra, and played with rock and roll music bands. Armin was a founder of the Camerata Canada in 1973, appearing across Canada, Cuba and South America. She and Peter Elyakim Taussig recorded the sonatas of Johannes Brahms and Felix Mendelssohn in 1971, performed with the Armin Electric Strings. From 1988, with the contemporary music ensemble Sound Pressure, she toured Europe and the United States, commissioned and premiered works by Martin Arnold, Glenn Buhr, Bruno Degazio, Linda C. Smith, Robert Stevenson, and James Tenney, and was heard frequently on the CBC Radio program Two New Hours.

Armin became the concert mistress of the Toronto Philharmonic Orchestra in 1989, and setup the avant garde/jazz/roots ensemble Hemisphere with her brother Richard, commissioning and premiering works by Norma Beecroft, Larry Lake, and Norman Symonds. Starting from 1990, she performed solo concerts of works by Sergio Barroso among others (frequently with the RAAD violin and electronic tape) in Germany, Minnesota, and New York. Armin recorded the Bach's Violin Concerto in E Major in June 1991 and performed works by Antonio Vivaldi and Ludwig van Beethoven on several Classical Kids albums, such as Beethoven Lives Upstairs.

== Personal life ==
She had three children. Armin died of cancer on June 26, 2022 at the Lakeridge Oshawa Hospital. A memorial service for her took place at the Mount Lawn Funeral Home on July 24, 2022.
