= Peace tree =

Peace Tree may refer to:

== Trees ==
- Peace Tree, any of several trees planted as an inspiration by the film The Peace Tree
- Tree of Peace, the species of tree associated with the Iroquois symbol for peace
- International World War Peace Tree, a tree celebrating the end of World War I and symbolizing an alliance between Germany and the United States

== Popular culture ==
- The Peace Tree, a 2005 film

== Geography ==
- Peace Tree, Ontario

== Other ==
- Tree of Peace, an Iroquois symbol
