= Leo Smith (composer) =

English composer, writer, music critic, music educator and cellist

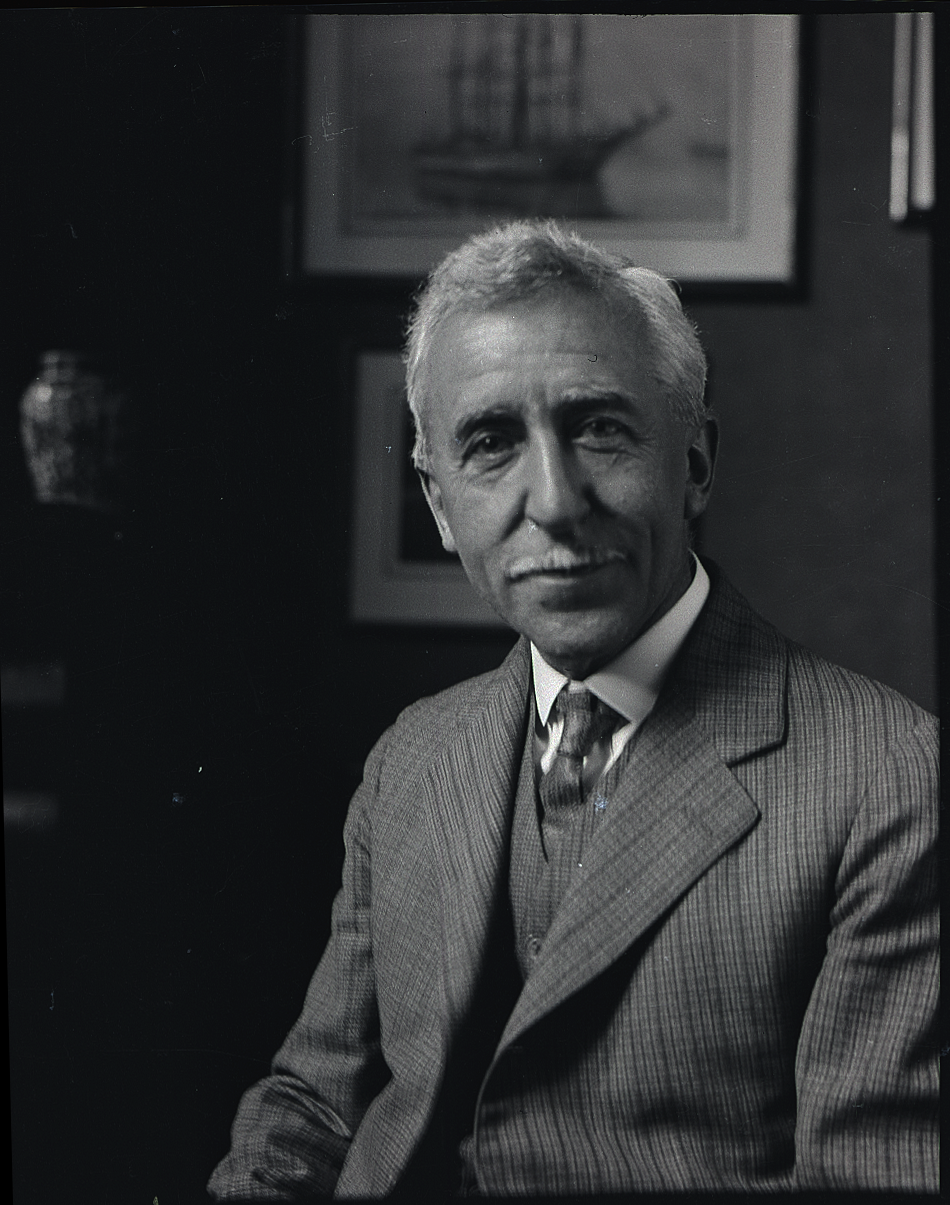
Joseph Leopold Smith by Melvin Ormond Hammond, 1932

Joseph Leopold Smith (26 November 1881 – 18 April 1952) was an English composer, writer, music critic, music educator, and cellist who was primarily active in Canada. His compositional output consists of works for cello, piano, choir and orchestra (most notably An Ancient Song and A Summer Idyll) and a considerable amount of chamber music (most notably String Quartet in D, Sonata in E Minor and A Horse Race Ballad).

== Early life in the UK ==
Smith was born in Birmingham. A child prodigy, he began studying cello at a very young age with W.H. Priestley in Birmingham and then later with Carl Fuchs in Manchester. His first professional cello recital was given at the Birmingham Town Hall in 1890 when he was just 8 years old as part of the Harrison Concert series. Since then he performed actively in concerts as both a soloist and a chamber musician. Eventually he pursued further training at the Royal Northern College of Music and the University of Manchester (UM) where he was a pupil of Henry Hiles. While at the UM, he became a member of the Hallé Orchestra and eventually played in the orchestra at the Royal Opera House for five years. He notably performed under the batons of Béla Bartók, Claude Debussy, Frederick Delius, Edward Elgar, and Richter among others.

== Life in Canada ==
In 1910 Smith emigrated to Canada, and was quickly hired by Frank Welsman to play for his Toronto Symphony Orchestra (no relation to the current orchestra of that name), becoming principal cellist in 1917 for that orchestra's final season. He met his wife, violinist Lena Hayes Smith (188?–1956), while playing in Welsman's orchestra. He later became a member of the new Toronto Symphony Orchestra when it was founded in 1922, serving as its principal cellist from 1932–1940. In 1938 he became principal cellist of the Toronto Philharmonic Orchestra (TPO), a position he held until the mid-1940s.

Smith was appointed to the faculty of the Toronto Conservatory of Music in 1911 where he was a professor of music composition, music history, music theory, and cello performance through 1941. While there he played with two notable chamber groups in residence at the school, the Conservatory Trio in his early years and later the Conservatory String Quartet from 1929–1941. He was also a member of two notable string quartets in Toronto, the Toronto String Quartette, with whom he played in 1914, and the Academy String Quartet, with whom he played during the 1920s. From 1927 until his retirement in 1950, Smith taught on the music faculty of the University of Toronto. Among his notable pupils were Marcus Adeney, Louis Applebaum, Gerald Bales, John Beckwith, Keith Bissell, Howard Brown, Glenn Gould, Kenneth Peacock, Margaret Sargent, and Bertha Tamblyn. See: List of music students by teacher: R to S#Leo Smith. He died in Toronto, aged 70.

== Works as a writer ==
As a writer, Smith first displayed his talents as a contributing editor from 1918 – 1935 to the magazine Conservatory Quarterly Review ISSN 0704-7533.

Smith wrote three music textbooks all of which became widely used in North America and went through numerous editions:

- Smith, Leo (1920). Musical Rudiments. Boston: The Boston Music Company. ISBN 978-1-177-64935-3. OCLC 697582009.
- — (1931). Music of the Seventeenth and Eighteenth Centuries. Toronto: J.M. Dent and Sons. OCLC 3377389.
- — (1939). Elementary Part-Writing. Oakville, Ontario: Frederick Harris Music. OCLC 56287692.

From 1950 – 1952 he was a music critic for The Globe and Mail newspaper.

== See also ==
- Music of Canada
- Canadian classical music
- List of Canadian musicians
