= Margaret Miller Brown =

Canadian pianist and music educator (1903–1970)

- Born: April 22, 1903; Owen Sound, Ontario, Canada
- Died: February 15, 1970 (aged 66) Owen Sound, Ontario, Canada
- Genres: Classical music
- Occupation: Concert pianist
- Instrument: Piano
- Years active: 1927–1950s

Margaret Miller Brown (April 22, 1903 – February 15, 1970) was a Canadian classical pianist and music educator. She performed in concert for more than 20 years, touring mostly in Canada and, in 1951, Europe. Concurrently, she taught at the Toronto Conservatory of Music for over four decades. She also traveled throughout Canada administering student examinations and adjudicating piano classes for various organizations.

== Early life and education ==
Margaret Miller Brown was born on April 22, 1903, in Owen Sound, Southwestern Ontario, Canada. Hers was a musical family. She studied piano under Frank Welsman and Mona Bates in Toronto, and under Ernest Hutcheson in New York.

== Musical career ==
Brown made her professional debut at the Toronto Conservatory of Music on March 1, 1927. She debuted in London at Aeolian Hall on June 15, 1936. On June 13, 1940, she premiered Ulric Cole's Divertimento with the Promenade Symphony Orchestra. She performed with the Toronto Symphony Orchestra, the Toronto Philharmonic Orchestra, and in Bates' Ten-Piano Ensemble. She was also a featured artist for piano series broadcast by the Canadian Broadcasting Corporation and by radio station CKRC. She performed on concert tours into the 1950s in Canada and, in 1951, in Europe. A 1955 article said she was called "a thorough master of her instrument".

== Teaching career ==
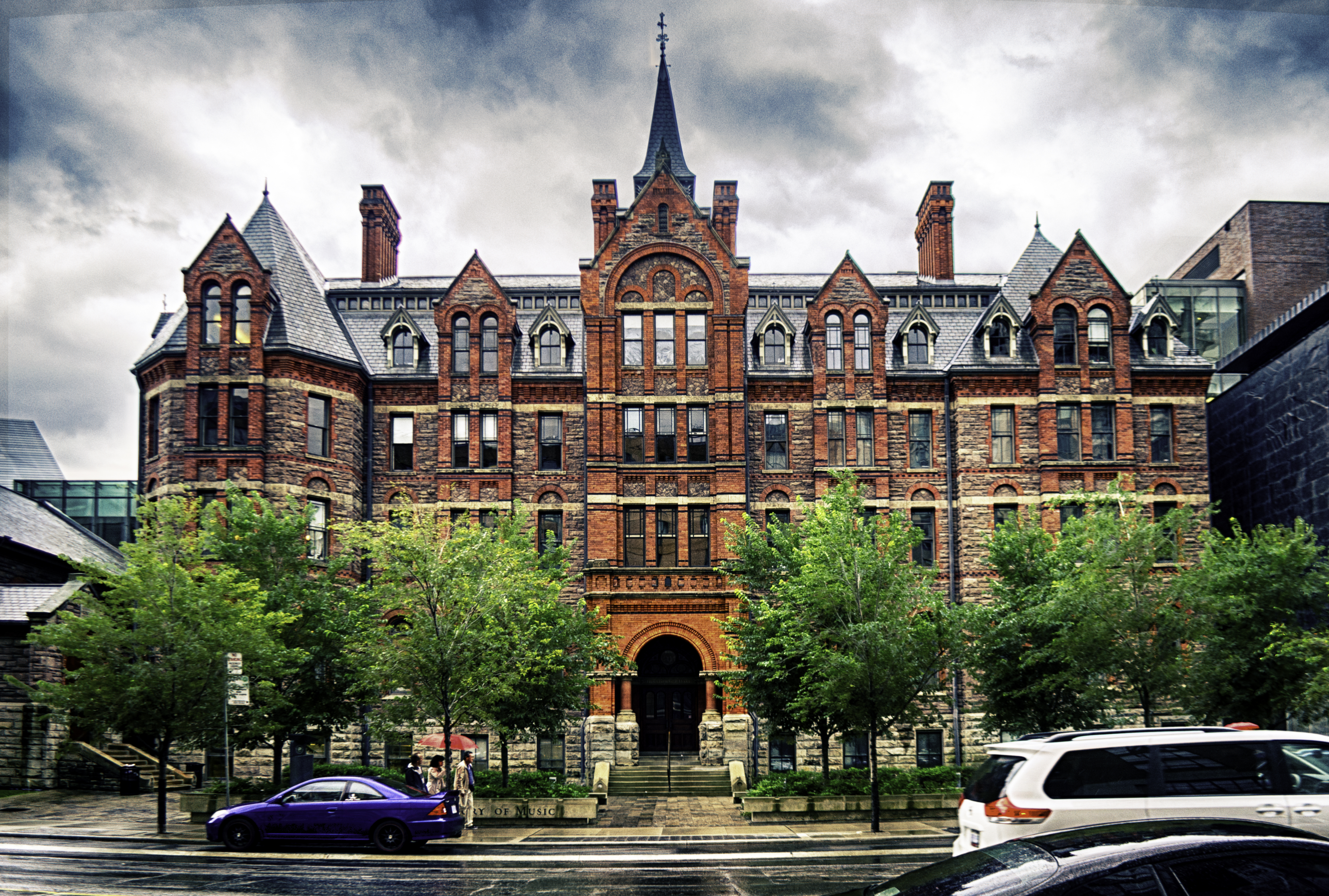
The Royal Conservatory of Music

Brown taught at the Toronto Conservatory of Music (later renamed The Royal Conservatory of Music) from 1924 to 1969. She also taught at the University of Toronto. With her students, Brown was known as a "tough taskmistress" and "extremely rigid in her musical viewpoint". According to a biographer of John Arpin, whose parents engaged Brown for private lessons when he was 14 years old: "Her concept of teaching was to have her students play pieces from a very narrow curriculum, which she selected, using fingering exactly as written, but with 'feeling'". This approach did not satisfy the young Arpin's desire to explore and experiment with a variety of styles besides classical music.

Among Brown's notable students were Brian Cherney, John Coveart, Clifford Poole, Doug Riley, and Clifford von Kuster.

Brown was the first woman examiner in piano for Western Canada. In a 1953 interview with the Regina Leader-Post, she noted that between 30,000 and 35,000 student examinations—the majority of them in piano—were administered throughout the country annually. Adjusted by grade level, the piano examinations covered a range of categories, including "general style, rhythm, quality and variety of tone, technical ability and accuracy", as well as auditory and visual tests.

Brown also adjudicated piano classes for various Canadian organizations, including the Windsor Music Festival in 1955, the Lambton County Music Festival in 1959, and summer courses for the Ontario Registered Music Teachers' Association in Stratford and Peterborough, Ontario, in 1962.

== Personal life ==
Brown died in Owen Sound on February 15, 1970.

== Works ==
- Piano Hand Book (1962) (with Mary MacKinnon Shore)
