= Frank Edward Blachford =

Canadian violinist, teacher, conductor and composer

Frank Edward Blachford (December 28, 1879 – June 24, 1957) was a Canadian violinist, teacher, conductor and composer.

Blachford was born in Toronto and was a violin student there of Bertha Drechsler Adamson at the Toronto Conservatory of Music, graduating in 1897. He continued his studies with the violinist Hans Sitt and the composer Carl Reinecke at the Leipzig Conservatory and with Henri Marteau in Geneva. He returned to Canada in 1901 and taught at the Toronto Conservatory of Music until his death.

Blachford served as the concertmaster of the Toronto Conservatory Orchestra from 1906 to 1908 and of the Toronto Symphony Orchestra (Welsman) from 1908 until it disbanded in 1918. He also was a member of the first violin section of the Toronto Symphony Orchestra under Ernest MacMillan from 1932 to 1946. Blachford appeared on occasion as a violin soloist in concerts and broadcasts in Canada.

As a chamber musician, Blachford was the violinist in the Schumann Trio from 1902 to 1905 and the Conservatory Trio from 1926 to 1928, and founded and served as the first violinist of the Toronto String Quartette from 1907 until the mid-1920s. As a conductor, he led the Toronto Conservatory of Music String Orchestra from 1914 to 1925, and the Victoria College Orchestra from 1920 to 1930. In 1932 he formed the Blachford String Symphony, which consisted of 16 musicians drawn from the Toronto Symphony Orchestra and performed both in concert and also in CBC broadcasts. In later years he concentrated on teaching for the Toronto Conservatory of Music and in the public schools. Among his many pupils over the years were Albert Aylward, Jack Montague, and Harvey Perrin.

His publications included pedagogical works for the violin such as the Blachford Violin Class Book published in 1949 by Gordon V. Thompson Ltd of Toronto. He also made transcriptions of baroque and romantic music for string quartet or orchestra. Original compositions by Blachford include Three Rhythmical Tunes (1929) for violin and piano, Idylle and Romance for solo violin and strings and Suite from the Ontario Northlands for orchestra, as well as a number of songs and other vocal music.

Blachford died in Calgary at the age of 77 while on an examining trip for the Royal Conservatory of Music.
