= Bertha Drechsler Adamson =

British musician (1848–1924)

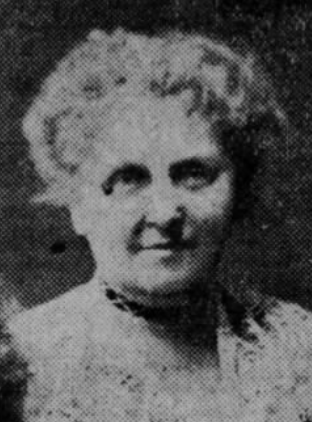
- Bertha Drechsler Adamson, from a 1924 obituary
- Born: 25 March 1849; Edinburgh, Scotland, U.K.
- Died: 12 May 1924 (aged 75); Toronto, Ontario, Canada
- Occupations: Violinist, music educator
- Children: 6, including Lina Drechsler Adamson

Bertha Drechsler Adamson (25 March 1849 – 12 May 1924) was a Scottish-born Canadian violinist, educator and conductor.

The daughter of Adam Hamilton, who taught music at the University of Edinburgh, she was born Bertha Drechsler Hamilton in Edinburgh. With her sister Emily, she studied violin in Leipzig with Ferdinand David. She performed with her father's quartet, which included her sister and her brother Carl, in the United Kingdom. After she married in 1869, she moved to Hamilton, Ontario, later settling in Toronto. In 1887, she joined the teaching staff of the newly formed Toronto Conservatory of Music. In 1888, she was first violinist for the Conservatory String Quartette; she left the Conservatory later that year but returned in 1895. She was Concert Mistress in 1906/07 of the newly formed Toronto Conservatory Symphony Orchestra and was second desk of the Toronto Symphony Orchestra through 1911 at least. From 1901 to 1904, she was first violin for the Toronto Conservatory String Quartette.

Pupils of Drechsler Adamson included Harry Adaskin, Frank Edward Blachford, Julia Grover Choate and Lina Drechsler Adamson, her daughter.

She died in Toronto at the age of 76.
