= Lawrence Pitchko =

Canadian pianist

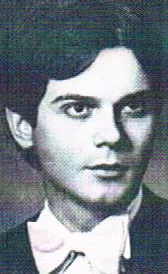
Lawrence Pitchko

Lawrence Pitchko (born 1953) is a pianist and master teacher born in St. Catharines, Ontario, Canada, and currently residing in Toronto.

== Biography ==
Pitchko started to play the piano when he was four. At age eight, he and his family moved to Toronto where he continued his musical studies with Canadian pianists Margaret Miller Brown and Sheila Henig at the Royal Conservatory of Music. At the age of twelve Pitchko gave his debut recital, and at fifteen he became an Associate of the Royal Conservatory (ARCT). He gained recognition at local competitions, winning prizes and scholarships.

At the age of 19 he was invited to study with Kenneth van Barthold in London, England, and enrolled in The Piano Workshop course given by him as part of the International Summer School at the University of Edinburgh. After numerous recitals in London and Edinburgh, Pitchko returned to Canada and entered university. In the summer of 1974 he performed Franz Liszt's Piano Concerto No. 1 with the Toronto Symphony Orchestra at the Ontario Place Forum with guest conductor, the late Andre Kostelanetz. As well, the Canada Council for the Arts awarded him a grant for study in England with teachers Maria Curcio, pianist Louis Kentner, pianist Katharina Wolpe, and Kenneth van Barthold.

For the next six years, Pitchko was based in London, England, and also gave recitals on both continents in cities like Edinburgh, Paris, Antwerp, Brussels, Toronto, New York City and Palm Springs, California. His debut performance at the Wigmore Hall in London was very well received and his subsequent recitals were reviewed in The Times and the London Daily Telegraph. In 1976 the American pianist Earl Wild invited Pitchko (the only Canadian pianist) to perform at the First Festival of Piano Music at the Palm Springs Desert Museum. In 1978, Pitchko made his debut on the CBC Radio Network "Arts National" programme and was featured on FM radio station, CJRT. He also received two more awards: the newly instituted Mona Bates Scholarship and the Floyd Chalmers Foundation Award by the Ontario Arts Council allowing him further study in Europe.

The culmination of this six-year period of study abroad was the prize that he received in Belgium in late 1978. French and Flemish newspapers declared Pitchko the recipient of the Alex de Vries Fund Award. He was also invited by BBC Radio to London, England, which was a "triumphant BBC recital debut" according to John Kraglund of the Globe and Mail.

In 1981, after his return to Canada, Lawrence received the du Maurier Merit Award and began to re-establish his career in his home country. In April 1982 a review in the Toronto Star by Ronald Hambleton read: "Pianist again displays special affinity for Liszt." The recital by Pitchko took place at the St. Lawrence Centre Town Hall, a venue in which he performed the most frequently. He appeared both as soloist, and with other musicians such as violinist Victor Danchenko, soprano Lynn Blaser, and flutist Charles Tanner. The Serenata Trio, of which he was a founding member along with soprano Valerie Siren, and clarinetist Patricia Wait, played their debut concert in the venue in 1985. The trio also inaugurated the newly built multipurpose auditorium at the Toronto Centre YMCA in 1986 as part of the Syrinx Concert series. In 2006, Pitchko participated in a series of recordings of Jewish devotional music of the 18th-20th centuries, entitled "I heard a voice from heaven=Shama 'ti bat kol" with Louis Danto, Rouhama Danto, Charles Heller and Rivka Golani-Erdesz.

Other venues in which Pitchko held concerts include Walter Hall in the Edward Johnson Building at the University of Toronto, The Royal Conservatory Concert Hall, and the Premiere Dance Theatre and the Brigantine Room at Harbourfront Centre.

By the year 2000, Pitchko was teaching and mentoring advanced students of all ages, among them David Lee and Ricker Choi, and presenting them in various venues around the city including Walter Hall and as part of the Orchardviewers Series at the Northern District Library in Toronto.

== Awards ==
- 1974 - Canada Council Grant
- 1978 - Mona Bates Award
- 1978 - Ontario Arts Council – Floyd Chalmers Foundation Award
- 1978 - Alex de Vries Prize of Belgium
- 1979 - Du Maurier Merit Award

== Discography ==
1. The Lawrence Pitchko Legacy, Vol 1: The Russian Album: Rachmaninoff and Mussorgsky, 2008. Accudub Inc., ID 2852151
2. The Lawrence Pitchko Legacy, Vol 2: The Chopin Album: four Ballades and Sonata No. 3 in B minor, 2008. Accudub Inc., ID 2852153
3. The Lawrence Pitchko Legacy, Vol 3: Early Beethoven: Piano Sonata 13; "Spring" Violin Sonata; Clarinet Trio; Piano and Winds Quintet, 2007
4. The Lawrence Pitchko Legacy, Vol 4: The Brahms Album: Piano Sonata No. 3 in F minor, Opus 5; Paganini Variations, Opus 35 (books 1 and 2); nine songs, 2008. Accudub Inc., ID 2852169
5. I heard a voice from heaven = Shama ‘ti bat kol: Jewish devotional music of the 18th-20th centuries by Louis Danto; Rivka Golani-Erdesz; Lawrence Pitchko
6. I heard a voice from heaven = Shama ‘ti bat kol: Jewish devotional music of the 18th-20th centuries by Louis Danto; Rouhama Danto; Charles Heller; Rivka Golani-Erdesz; Lawrence Pitchko
