= Rivka Golani =

Israeli violist (born 1946)

Rivka Golani (Hebrew: רבקה גולני; born 22 March 1946) is an Israeli-born viola player. She has performed as soloist with many orchestras throughout the world including the Boston Symphony, Calgary Philharmonic, Royal Concertgebouw, BBC Symphony, BBC Philharmonic, Hong Kong Symphony, Singapore Symphony, Royal Philharmonic, Rotterdam Philharmonic, Israel Philharmonic, Tokyo Metropolitan, Montreal Symphony and the Toronto Symphony.

Golani was born in Tel Aviv. Her father Yakov Gulnik was from Warsaw, and had lost his family in the Holocaust. Her mother Liza Goldstein was from Polish Galicia. Golani took up the violin at age 7, while her sister Bela learned the cello. Golani was a mathematics prodigy.

Golani became a pupil of the violinist Alexander Moskowsky at age 18. She switched to viola at age 21 and studied with the violist Oedoen Partos, and became a member of the Israel Philharmonic Orchestra. She married the Hungarian luthier Otto Erdesz, and in 1974 the couple moved to Canada, where she gave birth to her son Micha Eden Erdesz. She became a citizen of Canada in 1983. Erdesz manufactured for her what has been her preferred instrument throughout her career. After their divorce, Golani married German conductor Thomas Sanderling and moved to London. She later returned to Canada briefly before she married again. She currently resides in London with her husband Jeremy Joseph Fox. Golani is also a painter and has exhibited in America, Canada, Israel and the UK.

Golani's CD recordings include the Elgar Cello Concerto arranged for viola with the Royal Philharmonic Orchestra, the Bartok Concerto with the Budapest Symphony, Martinu's Rhapsody Concerto with the Bern Symphony, Chaconne by Pulitzer Prize winner Michael Colgrass with the Toronto Symphony Orchestra, and a three CD set of works by Johann Sebastian Bach arranged for solo viola.

== Discography ==
- Arnold, M. Concerto for Viola and Chamber Orchestra, Op. 108. London Musici, Mark Stephenson – Conductor. Conifer Classics 75605-51211-2 (1992, recorded 1991), Conifer Classics 75605 51263 2 (1996)
- Bach, J.S. Six Suites for solo Violoncello – transcribed for solo Viola BWV 1007–1012; Bach/Z. Kodály (arr.) Chromatic Fantasy BWV 903; J. S. Bach Chaconne BWV 1004. (2001). MVCD 1141-3 CBC Records.
- Bach, J.S. Brandenburg Concertos – Complete Set (No. 6 for two violas & Orchestra), CBC Vancouver Orchestra, Mario Bernardi – Conductor. CBC – SMCD5082
- Bach, J.S. Chromatic Fantasia (ed. Kodály) in The History of the Viola on Record, Vol IV.. Pearl – GEMS 0039
- Bartók, B. Viola Concerto; Serly Viola Concerto; Rhapsody. Budapest Symphony Orchestra, Andras Ligeti – conductor. (1990). Conifer CDCF-189 (CD)
- Bax, A. Fantasy Sonata; J. S. Bach Sonata No. 2; Morawetz Sonata for harp and viola. With Judy Loman – harp. (1994). Marquis ERAD 131
- Berlioz, H. Harold in Italy. San Diego Symphony Orchestra, Yoav Talmi – Conductor. Naxos 8.553034
- Brahms, J. The Three Piano Quartets. With the Borodin Trio. (1990). 2-Chandos CHAN-8009 (CD)
- Brahms, J. Viola Sonata in F minor opus 120, no. 1, Viola Sonata E flat opus 120, no. 2; J. Joachim Variations on an Original Theme (world premier recording) opus 10. with Konstantin Bogino – piano. (1991). Conifer CDCF 199.
- Brahms, J. Zwei Gesänge, Op. 91 in "Maureen Forrester", with Maureen Forrester – Contralto and Thomas Muraco – Piano. CBC Records PSCD-2017
- Britten, B. Lachrymae. I Musici de Montréal. (1990). Chandos CHAN-8817 (CD)
- Cherney, B. Chamber Concerto for Viola and Ten Players. NMC Ens, R. Aitken – conductor. String Trio. Otto Armin – violin, P. Schenkman – violoncello. (1981). RCI 537
- Cherney, B. Shekinah for solo viola; In Stillness Ascending, with L. P. Pelletier – piano. (1991). McGill 750036-2
- Colgrass, M. Chaconne for Viola & Orchestra (CD also includes Bloch E. Suite Hébraique; Hindemith, P. Trauermusik; Britten, B Lachrymae), with Toronto Symphony Orchestra, Andrew Davis – Conductor. CBC SM-2-5087
- Elgar, Sir Edward. Cello Concerto in E minor, opus 85 (Viola transcription: L. Tertis); Bax, Arnold: Phantasy for Viola and Orchestra – 1920. Royal Philharmonic Orchestra, Vernon Handley – conductor. (1988). Conifer CFC-171/CDCF 171
- Freedman, H. Opus Pocus. With Robert Aitken – flute, Otto Armin – violin, Peter Schenkman – violoncello. (1983). Centrediscs CMC-0983
- Glick, S.I. Music for Passover. Beth Tikvah Synagogue Choir, Beth Tzedec Chor, Kernerman violin, McCartney violin, Miller violoncello, Glick conductor. 4-ACM 34 (CD)
- Hatzis, C. Pyrrichean Dances, with Beverley Johnston – Percussion, and Symphony Nova Scotia, Bernhard Gueller – Conductor, CBC Records, SMCD-5243
- Koprowski, P. Concerto for Viola and Orchestra. Toronto Symphony, Jukka-Pekka Saraste – conductor. (2001). SMCD 5206
- Martinu, B. Rhapsody-Concerto. Bern Symphony Orchestra, Peter Maag – conductor. (1986). Conifer CFC-146
- Papineau-Couture, J. Prouesse. (1986). RCI 647
- Prokofiev, S. Overture on Hebrew Themes OP. 34 – with the Borodin Trio and James Campbell. CHAN-8924
- Rubbra, E. Concerto in A for viola and orchestra, opus 75; Little violin. (1994). Royal Philharmonic Orchestra, Vernon Handley – Conductor. Conifer CDCF 225
- Schumann, R. Märchenerzählungen. With J. Campbell – clarinet, William Tritt – piano. (1986). RCI 637
- Schumann, R. Fairly Tales Op. 113; 3 Romances Op. 94; 5 Pieces in Folk Style Op. 102; Fairy Tale Narrations with clarinet Op. 132. With Joaquín Valdepeñas – clarinet. Bernadene – Blaha piano. (1999). MVCD 1127
- Sohal, N. Shades IV in Chamber Music Vol. I – MERUCD001
- Weill, K. Kiddush (in The London Viola Sound); viola solo and 48 violas from London orchestras, Geoffrey Simon – Conductor, CALA Records – CACD0106
- Yuasa, Joji. Eye on Genesis – Revealed Time for Viola & Orchestra. Tokyo Metropolitan Orchestra, Hiroyuki Iwaki – Conductor. FOCD-2508
- Zehavi, O. Concerto for Viola * Orchestra. Haifa Symphony Orchestra, Stanley Sperber – Conductor. MII-CD-22
- Zuckert, L. Shepherd's Sadness, Lento Triste. With Patricia Parr – piano. (1986). Jubal 5007

=== Compilations ===
- The Viola Volume I: Grigoras Dinicu: Hora Staccato; Gabriel Faure: Après un Rêve Op. 7; Claude Debussy: Romance; Antonín Dvořák: Bagatelle No. 3 Henry Purcell: Aria; Enrique Granados – Spanish Dance, Op. 37 No. 2 "Oriental" (12 Spanish Danses); Johannes Brahms: Hungarian Dance No. 1 – Hungarian Dance No. 3 in F Major; Arthur Benjamin: Jamaican Rumba; Modest Petrovich Mussorgsky – Hopak; Christoph Willibald Gluck: Melody from Orfeo; Richard Heuberger: Midnight Bells; Fritz Kreisler: Liebesleid – Schön Rosmarin; Carl Maria von Weber: Andante and Hungarian Rondo in C minor. J. 79.
- The Viola Volumes II & III: Franz Schubert: Sonata in A minor for Arpeggione and Piano; Robert Schumann: Märchenbilder, Op. 113; Joachim: Hebrew Melodies (Impressions of Byron's Poems), Op. 9; Brahms: Sonata F minor Op. 120, No. 1; Dmitri Shostakovich: Sonata for Viola and Piano Op. 147. Samuel Sanders – piano. 1984-5. 2-Masters of the Bow MBS-2021-2
- Viola Nouveau: Works by Barnes – Cherney – Jaeger – O. Joachim – Prévost. (1983). Centrediscs CMC-0883/(Prévost) 6-ACM 28
- Prouesse: Works by Jaeger – Tittle – Mozetich – Papineau-Couture – Southam. Centrediscs CMC-4492
- Rivka Golani: Works by MacIntosh – Harmon – Hiscott – Colgrass. Centrediscs CMC-5798
- I Heard a Voice from Heaven – Jewish Devotional Music of 18th – 20th Centuries, Cantor Louis Danto with pianist Lawrence Pitchko, Cadenza Records, Toronto, Canada.
- Rivka Golani Encores: Works by Brahms, Kreisler, Paganini, Gluck, Rachmaninov, von Weber, Wieniawski, Massenet, Godowsky (Heifetz), Dinicu (Heifetz) and Bruch, with Michelle Levin, Piano, Hungaroton Classic HCD 32645
