= Kenneth Peacock =

Canadian pianist and ethnomusicologist

Kenneth Howard Peacock (7 April 1922 – 22 November 2000) was a Canadian ethnomusicologist, composer, and pianist. He was a leading authority in Canadian enthnomusicology, and his research and publications in that field had a profound impact on the folk music revival in Canada of the mid to late 20th century. He was an associate of the Canadian Music Centre, a founding member of the Canadian Music Council, and a member of the Canadian League of Composers. In 1982 he was named a Member of the Order of Canada, and in 1998 was awarded the Marius Barbeau Medal by the Folklore Studies Association of Canada.

== Life and career ==
Born in Toronto, Peacock earned as associate diploma from the Toronto Conservatory of Music (TCM) in 1937 where he was a piano student of Alma Cockburn. From 1937 to 1946 he was active as a private tutor in piano and music theory in Toronto. In 1939-1940 he pursued further piano studies privately with Mona Bates. In 1941 he entered the University of Toronto where he studied music theory with Healey Willan and Leo Smith. After earning a Bachelor of Music in 1943, he continued with graduate studies in composition at the UT with John Weinzweig from 1944 to 1946.

Peacock returned to the TCM for further piano studies under Reginald Godden in 1948–1949. In early 1950 he moved to Montreal to study the piano with Michel Hirvy. He moved to Boston the following autumn to study composition with Francis Judd Cooke at the New England Conservatory. From 1947 to 1954 he was active as teacher in Ottawa. He worked on the staff of the Canadian Museum of Civilization from 1951 to 1972 as an ethnomusicologist and research fellow. He wrote many articles for a variety of musical periodicals during his career, in addition to having work published through the Museum of Civilization. He was also active as a pianist in several Canadian cities.
