= Marilla Adams =

Canadian artist (1864–1966)

- Born: 1864; Zorra, Canada West
- Died: November 2, 1966 (aged 101–102); Montréal, Quebec, Canada
- Education: Alma College, Ontario School of Art, School of Design, New York, Art Association of Montreal
- Known for: Textiles, Wood carving

Marilla Adams (1864 – November 2, 1966) was a Canadian artist.

== Biography ==
Adams was born in 1864 in Zorra, Canada West. She attended Alma College, a women's college in St. Thomas, Ontario. There she studied under Frederic Marlett Bell-Smith along with Cornelia Saleno and Eva Brook Donly. She continued her education at the Ontario School of Art, the School of Design in New York, and the Art Association of Montreal.

Adams taught for a time at Simpson College in Indianola, Iowa, before traveling to Europe. Around the beginning of World War I, she returned to Canada. She settled in Montréal, Quebec, where she taught weaving and wood carving to wounded soldiers. In January 1926, she reviewed the work of charitable organizations in the city, and spoke on behalf of the ones she felt did the most to "alleviate handicaps of the underprivileged".

She died in Montréal on November 2, 1966.

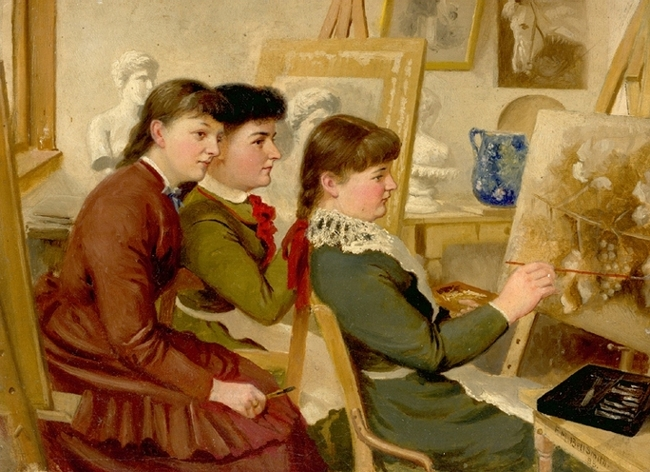
Adams (center) in Three Artists by Frederic Marlett Bell-Smith, c. 1883, which depicts three of Bell-Smith's students at Alma College.
