= Eva Brook Donly =

Canadian artist

- Born: April 30, 1867; Simcoe, Ontario
- Died: 1941; Simcoe, Ontario
- Education: Alma College (Diploma); Ontario School of Art (now the Ontario College of Art and Design) (grade A certificate)
- Occupation: artist
- Known for: painting

Eva Brook Donly (April 30, 1867 – 1941) was a Canadian artist living in Ontario.

== Career ==
Born in Simcoe, she was rewarded a fine arts diploma from Alma Ladies' College and then a grade A certificate from the Ontario School of Art. From 1887 to 1890, Donly was head of the art department at Alma College. She then studied at the Institute of Artist-Artisans in New York City. She next went to Mexico City, where she opened a book shop and also met Augustine Donly, whom she married in Canada in 1896. The couple returned to Mexico City in 1905. After studies at the San Carlos Academy there, she began painting again, painting portraits and landscapes of Mexico, Bermuda and Canada.

She died in Simcoe in 1941 and, in her will, left her former home to Norfolk County for use as a museum; it is now known as the Eva Brook Donly Museum. Her work is held in the collection of the museum, as well as that of the National Gallery of Canada. One of her paintings of a U-boat which was used in campaign to sell Victory bonds is owned by the United States government.

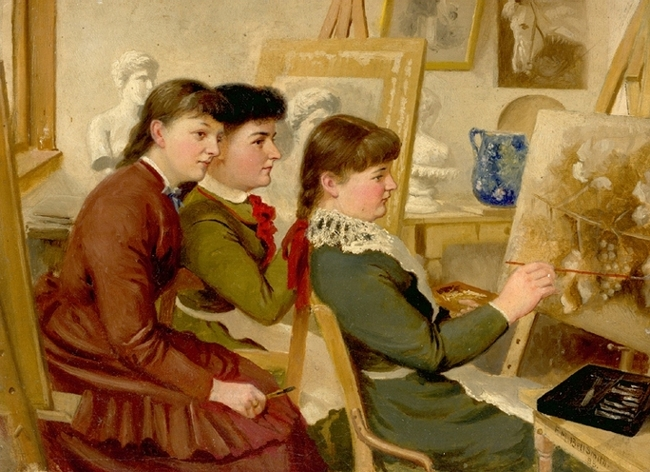
Alma College Art Students, Eva Brook Donly, left, Marilla Adams, and Cornelia Saleno at work in the college's art studio by Frederic Marlett Bell-Smith, c. 1883
