= Louis Danto =

Polish singer

Louis Harry Danto (May 2, 1929 - July 23, 2010) was a lyric tenor and cantor. He was acclaimed for his cantorial music, concert appearances and recordings of Italian, Russian, and French opera repertoire. Danto performed throughout North America, Europe and Israel, and recorded 24 solo albums.

Danto was recognized for the "rare beauty and purity of his voice, its mastery, power and control, and for his breathtaking emotional expressivity." After a performance at Carnegie Hall, Alan Rich of the New York Times wrote, "a voice of great beauty, clear and true — breathtaking, radiant, as though from another world." George Jellinek, broadcaster and music critic for Stereo Review magazine (USA), wrote of Louis Danto: "No other tenor under contract to a major U.S. opera company today can duplicate such technique and overall control."

Danto served as cantor at Beth Emeth Bais Yehuda synagogue (Toronto, Ontario, Canada) from 1973 until his retirement in 1998. In 2005, he donated his historical collection of Jewish sheet music, recordings and books to the synagogue.

== Biography ==
Hersh Leib Marczuk (later Louis Danto) was born in Suwałki, a town in eastern Poland. As a child, he sang at his synagogue and performed as an alto soloist in the choirs of Jacob Berman and David Moshe Steinberg. During the 1939 partition of Poland by Nazi Germany and the USSR, his family moved eastward into Belarus in the Soviet zone. Soon afterwards, he won first prize with a Hebrew song in a children's singing competition in Baranovich, Belarus. During the competition, the Nazis invaded his city and murdered his entire family. Louis was fortunate enough to escape to Minsk. There he studied voice and cello at the local conservatory from 1939 to 1941. When Germany invaded Russia, Danto was moved once more this time with a group of other talented children deep into Russia where he continued his musical studies.

After the war, Danto moved to Rome to study voice with L. Samoshi. He caught the attention of world-renowned singers Beniamino Gigli and Tito Schipa, who heralded him as a major discovery in the tradition of the great bel canto tenors. Danto went on to New York to study with Dr. Puegell. Before his arrival in the United States in 1950 he performed in Russia and Italy. In the following years his repertoire expanded to include Italian, French and Russian opera, and Yiddish songs.

In 1954, Danto married Ada, with whom he had two daughters, Annette and Denise. After Ada's death, he married Rouhama, a native of Jerusalem, in 1969. They had a son, David.

== Music career ==
Louis Danto performed throughout the world to critical and popular acclaim. In December 1965, he chanted a special prayer at Tito Schipa's funeral in New York at the request of the family with leading singers from the Metropolitan Opera in attendance. In September 1984, he sang before Queen Elizabeth II and Prince Philip in Toronto's Maple Leaf Gardens to an inter-faith audience of 16,000 and millions of television viewers.

He recorded 24 solo albums for RCA, DaCamera, Musical Heritage Society, and Cadenza. The most recent recordings include Arias and Songs of Love, made during his 1995 concert tour of Europe, recorded with the State Opera of Prague and I Heard a Voice From Heaven recorded with violist Rivka Golani, both released in the spring of 1996. In December 1997 he released Music From The Soul of a People.

Danto studied Hazzanut with conductor Leo Low and composer Herman Zalis. He expanded his knowledge of Jewish sources at the Yeshiva of Mirr where he studied from 1950 to 1954. He served as a cantor at the Jewish Center of Atlantic Beach, New York, Park Synagogue in Cleveland, Ohio, Beth Emeth Bais Yehuda synagogue in Toronto. After his retirement from Beth Emeth Bais Yehuda in 1998, he was honoured with the title Cantor Emeritas and remained an important part of the synagogue.

During his 1989 East-European tour of Moscow, Leningrad, Odessa, Kiev and Budapest he discovered the manuscripts of many songs from the long-lost original classics of Jewish music, several of which he recorded for the first time on his Gems of the Jewish Operetta and Masters of the Jewish Art Song/The St. Petersburg School.

In February 1998, Danto received an Honorary Doctorate in Music from the Jewish Theological Seminary in New York City.

== Cantor Louis Danto Music Library ==
Upon retirement, Danto announced his desire to dedicate his entire collection to Beth Emeth. His wish was approved at a general meeting in September 2004. The proposal included renovation of the Beth Emeth library as well as the construction of a stage and theatre seating 200, to permit performances of the great variety of Jewish music in his collection.

Authentic music from more than 100 years ago can be found in the collection. Some of the many examples of rare Jewish music include: Yiddish Culture from Kiev, published in 1921; Songs from Leipzig, published in 1920; an original edition of Avram Goldfaden's operetta King Ahasverus, published in 1899, and 500 Years of Yiddish Poetry, published in New York in 1917.

The categories include cantorial music, classified down to specific prayers, so if one wants many versions of, for example, L’Cha Dodi, one can easily find each version in one particular file. Similar files can be found for Yiddish folk songs, Yiddish pop songs, Yiddish operettas, Sephardic songs, serious compositions for cantor and choir, Chassidic music, and, among other categories, Jewish music written by such non-Jewish composers as Handel, Schubert, Mussorgsky, Prokofiev and Shostakovich. Right now, some of the rare books can be seen in glass cases in the Beth Emeth Library. Most of them are still in organized files in a Beth Emeth storage room. But all of the collection can still be viewed by the general public upon supervised request. The music exists not only as sheet music but also as 78 and 33 rpm records, big reel-to-reel tapes, cassette tapes, and CDs.

The collection has been praised by a number of experts, including Professor Edwin Seroussi, the Emmanuel Alexandre Professor of Musicology and Director of Jewish Music Research Centre of the Hebrew University of Jerusalem, and Dr Eliott Kahn, who has been the Music Archivist at the Library of the Jewish Theological Seminary for over 12 years.

== Discography ==
1. Zing un Tanz (Yiddish) – RCA 1653/54 – LP
2. Israeli Composers (Hebrew) – MHS 1653/54 – LP
3. Psalms of Israel, Hallel Oratorios (Hebrew) – MHS 1709 – LP
4. Song of My People (Yiddish) – Sound Path Records SP009 – LP
5. Russian Romantic Songs (Russian) – MHS 1185 – LP
6. Louis Danto Salutes Israel (Hebrew) – MHS 1781/Cadenza 113 – Cass/CD
7. Russian Romantic Songs (Russian) Da Camera TSM 9001/Cadenza 100 – LP/Cass/CD
8. Prayers of My People (Cantorial) – Cadenza 101 – LP/Cass/CD
9. Come Back to Sorrento (Italian) – Cadenza 102 – LP/Cass
10. Songs of Holocaust and Heroism (Yiddish) – Cadenza 103 – LP/Cass/CD
11. Favourite Jewish Songs (Yiddish) Cadenza 104 – 1997 - Cass/CD
12. None But The Lonely Heart (Fr, Ger, Russ) – MHS 3276/Cadenza 105 – Cass/CD
13. The Art of Cantor Louis Danto (Cantorial) – Cadenza 106 – Cass
14. Russian Art and Folk Songs (Russian) – Cadenza 107 – Cass/CD
15. Gems of The Jewish Operetta (Yiddish) – Cadenza 108 – Cass/CD
16. Masters of the Jewish Art Song/The St Petersburg School (Yiddish) – Cadenza 109 – Cass/CD
17. I Heard a Voice From Heaven (Liturgical: Hebrew, Ladino), with Rivka Golani, viola – Cadenza 110 – Cass/CD
18. Arias and Songs of Love (Fr, It, Rus, Eng, Sp, Ger) (with Prague State Orchestra, cond. Michel Philippe) – Cadenza 111, 1996 – Cass/CD
19. Music from the Soul of a People (Liturgical) – Cadenza 112 – Cass/CD
20. The Best of Louis Danto – Cadenza 114 – CD
21. Louis Danto in Recital, Vienna and New York (1961–65) (It, Gre, Rus, Heb, Pol) – Cadenza 115 - 2001 - CD (2CDs)
22. Musical Moments with Cantor Louis Danto: 50 years of musical treasures - LRCD120 (4CDs)

== See also ==
- Jewish music
- Jewish community of Toronto
