= Lina Drechsler Adamson =

Canadian musician

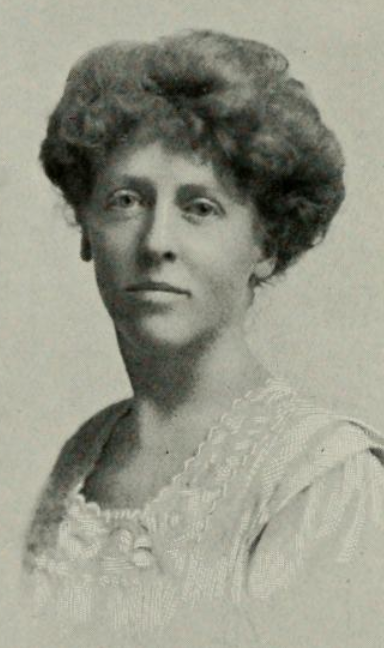
- Lina Drechsler Adamson, from a 1912 publication
- Born: Emily Caroline Adamson; 1876; Brockville, Ontario, Canada
- Died: 28 February 1960; Toronto, Ontario, Canada
- Occupation(s): Violinist, conductor, music educator
- Mother: Bertha Drechsler Adamson

Lina Drechsler Adamson (1876 – 28 February 1960) was a Canadian violinist, conductor, and music educator.

== Early life and education ==
Adamson was born in Brockville, Ontario, the daughter of James Robertson Adamson and Bertha Drechsler Adamson. Both of her parents were born in Scotland. Her mother was a violinist and music educator. She trained as a violinist in Leipzig with Hans Sitt, and in Switzerland with André de Ribaupierre.

== Career ==
Back in Toronto after her European training, Adamson was considered one of the city's "prominent violinists". "She produced a good tone and showed good artistic judgment in phrasing and rhythm," reported a 1910 reviewer. She taught at the Toronto Conservatory of Music, and played in the conservatory's string quartet and string orchestra.

Adamson also played with the Toronto Symphony Orchestra, and gave solo recitals. She accompanied contralto Eva Mylott at a concert in New York in 1908. During World War I, she organized a musical program for a recruiting event at Toronto's Hippodrome. Later in her career, she conducted the conservatory's well-regarded junior orchestra, and the Toronto Ladies Ensemble. "Miss Adamson's skilful bow-arm conducting at rehearsals was the prime cause of so many various young players doing such a crisp, lively performance, without juvenile string-scratching," noted a Toronto Star reviewer in 1939.

== Personal life ==
Adamson died in 1960, in her eighties, in Toronto.
