= Kazan International Festival of Muslim Cinema =

Muslim festival in Russia

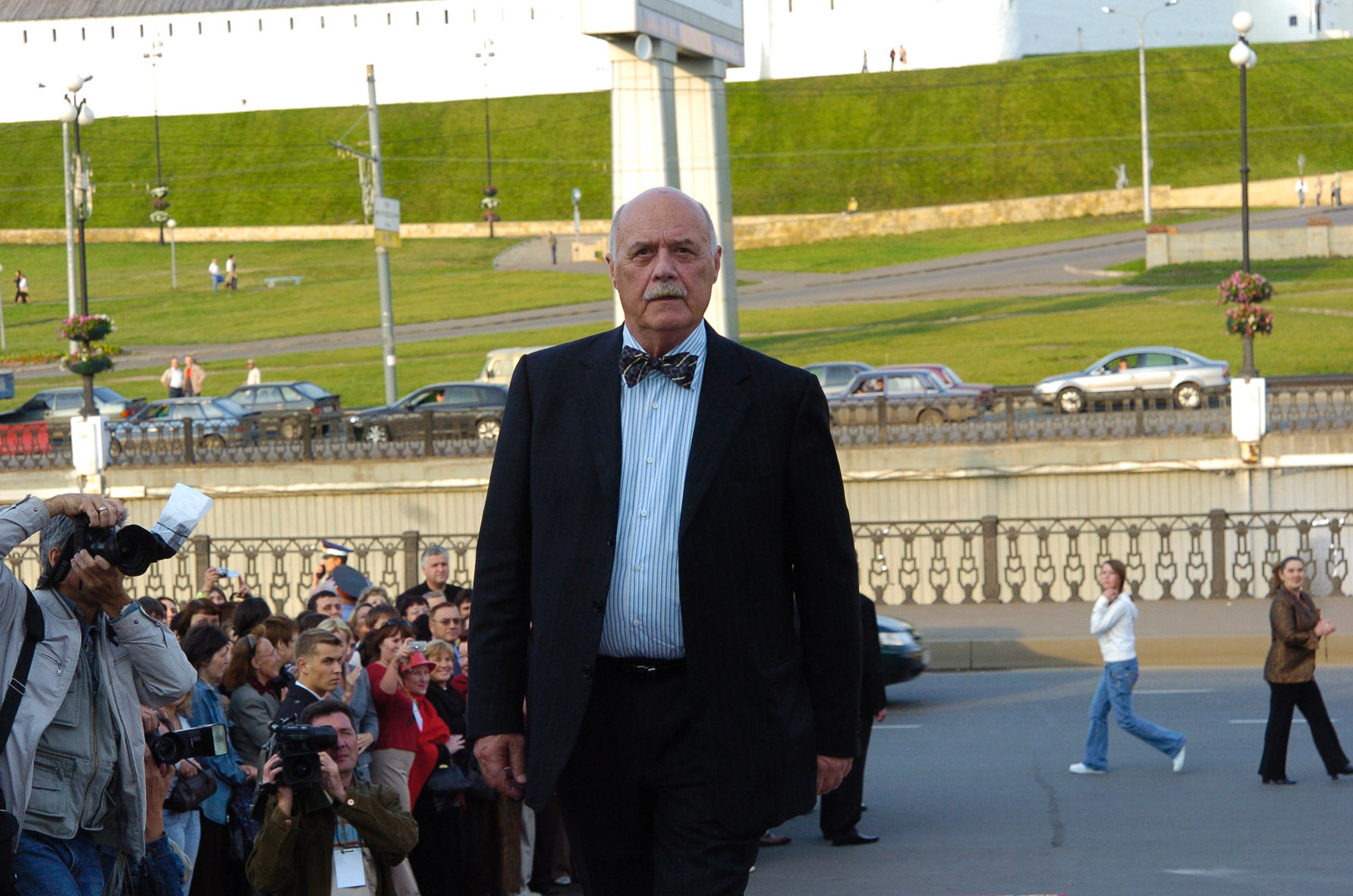
Opening of the 3rd International Muslim Film Festival "Golden Minbar"

The Kazan International Festival of Muslim Cinema (KIFMC) was created in 2005 as the Golden Minbar International Festival of Muslim Cinema. It takes place at the beginning of September in the town of Kazan, the capital of the Russian republic of Tatarstan. The festival is a showcase for Islamic and Muslim cinema, and issues a series of awards in various categories.

== History ==
Initially it was supposed to be a mobile festival between Muslim regions in Russia and countries of the Muslim world.

=== Golden Minbar International Festival Of Muslim Cinema ===
The Golden Minbar International Festival Of Muslim Cinema was initiated by the supervisory council of Muftis in Russia, the Islamic Culture Centre in Russia (ICCR), and Tatarstan's Ministry of Culture, and founded in Moscow in 2004 as an international forum for Muslim filmmakers.

The inaugural Golden Minbar International Festival of Muslim Cinema took place in Kazan, the capital of the Russian republic of Tatarstan on 5–11 September 2005. Around 20 countries participated in this edition of the festival, which celebrated the 1000th anniversary of Kazan. It was billed as the first ever Muslim film festival, and screened over 70 films from 18 countries, which included the Arab world as well as Iran, Turkey, the Central Asian states, Russia, Europe, Canada, and the United States. Soviet and Azerbaijani playwright and filmmaker Rustam Ibragimbekov was the head of the awards jury at the festival.

The second Golden Minbar festival also was held in Kazan, using the motto "religious tolerance and political correctness". A total of 175 pictures from 25 countries were submitted.

At the third edition of the festival, held in 2007, the guest of honour was the French actress Catherine Deneuve. By 2007, there were more than 40 countries taking part in the festival.

In 2009, the fifth edition of the festival took place between 30 September and 4 October in Kazan, featuring 34 films (12 feature films, 14 documentary films, and 8 short films).

=== Name change ===
After disagreement between the festival directors based in Moscow and organisers based in Kazan, the latter took over the event, and it was renamed the Kazan International Festival of Muslim Cinema from 2010. It was supported by the President of Tatarstan, the City of Kazan, the Ministry of Culture of the Republic of Tatarstan, and the Grand Mufti of Tatarstan.

In 2011, the festival was held from 6 to 11 September.

== Description ==
The Golden Minbar International Festival of Muslim Cinema is held in Kazan, and provides a place for meetings and an exchange of ideas among the filmmakers of Russia and from around the world. It is open not only to Muslims, but also to filmmakers of other faiths.

Inaugural festival director Zaudi Mamirgov director said that selection guidelines included certain criteria for films to be included in the festival: "they should contain no violence [and] no mysticism; the films should not incite hostility among people; they should stand for human values and help bring peoples closer together". One of the aims of the festival was to combat negative stereotypes of Muslims. The main goal of the festival is "to promote universal cultural and moral values, as well as to form an objective view of Muslims and Islam both in Russia and internationally".

== Awards ==
The festival awards cover many categories, and a statuette called the Golden Minbar was given in each in the early editions of the festival. This was in the shape of a reel of cine film, which includes the waves carrying an ark with a minbar, the pulpit from where an imam preaches in a mosque. Runners-up received a Silver Minbar, and those placed third a Bronze Minbar. There was also a President's Prize and a Prize from the Russian and Tatarstan Culture Ministries.

At the inaugural festival in 2005, The Magician, a drama by Azerbaijani director Oqtay Mirqasımov, won the main prize. A Golden Minbar was awarded to Russian filmmaker Vladimir Khotinenko for his 1995 film A Moslem. and his contributions to religious tolerance and respect for all religions.

In 2007, The Peace Tree, by Canadian filmmaker Mitra Sen, won the award for humanity in the art of film.

In 2008, the Indian film Jodhaa Akbar won two awards at the festival.
