= Gerald Bales =

Canadian organist and composer (1919–2002)

Gerald Albert Bales
- Born: May 12, 1919; Toronto, Ontario
- Died: July 4, 2002 (aged 83); London, Ontario

Gerald Albert Bales, CM (May 12, 1919 – July 4, 2002) was a Canadian organist and composer.

Born in Toronto, Ontario, Bales studied at the Toronto Conservatory of Music from 1936 to 1940 where he was a pupil of Herbert A. Fricker (conducting), Albert Procter (piano and organ), Leo Smith (music theory), and Healey Willan (music theory). In 1937 he gave his first professional organ concert at the Eaton Auditorium in Toronto, a performance which included some of his own compositions. As a soloist he had a major triumph in 1948 when he performed his Fantasy for piano and orchestra with the Chicago Philharmonic Orchestra.

From 1937 to 1941, he was an organist and choirmaster at St Anne's Anglican Church in Toronto. He went on to hold many different church posts in Toronto, Calgary, and Minneapolis up through 1971. From 1971 to 1984, he taught organ, choral conducting and orchestration at the University of Ottawa. He has composed over 120 works for piano, organ, voice, orchestra and chamber orchestra.

He was a Fellow and former president, from 1980 to 1982, of the Royal Canadian College of Organists. In 1996, he was made a Member of the Order of Canada.

== See also ==
- Music of Canada
- List of Canadian composers
