= Sergio Barroso =

Cuban composer, performer and professor

Sergio Fernández Barroso (also known as Sergio Barroso) (b. Havana, Cuba, 1946) is a Cuban composer, performer and professor.

== Academic Background ==
Sergio Barroso studied piano, theory and organ with Alfredo Levi, César Pérez Sentenat, Edgardo Martín, and Alfredo Diez Nieto at the Havana National “Amadeo Roldán” Conservatory, where he received an Honours Diploma in 1966.

At a later time he did post-graduate studies in composition and theory with Václav Dobiáš and Karel Jánacek at the Superior Academy of Music (AMJ) in Prague, and obtained a Post-Graduate Certificate at this institution in 1968. He took private classes with Alois Hába in the same city. Barroso also studied Orchestral Conducting with Manuel Duchesne Cuzán and Gonzalo Romeu at the Superior Institute of Arts (ISA), in Havana and computer music with John Chowning and Jean-Claude Risset at CCRMA, Stanford University (USA).

== Composer ==
As a composer, Sergio Barroso has received numerous commissions from organizations and individual performers; and has kept a busy international career, appearing frequently at ISCM events. He participated at the ISCM New Music Miami Festival as invited composer in 2004 and 2007.

Sergio Barroso's works have been performed at numerous concerts and events in the Americas, Europe and Asia; in venues such as the Lincoln Centre (New York City); the Kennedy Centre (Washington); the Monte Carlo Theatre (Monaco); IRCAM (Paris); Smétana Hall (Prague); Philharmonic Hall (Bratislava); Elizabeth Hall (London); Warsaw Autumn Festivals; Alicante and Manuel de Falla Festivals; Operas (Budapest, Helsinki, Warsaw, and San Francisco); Manila National Theatre, and São Paulo State Symphony Hall.

His works have been also broadcast through national networks in Europe, Japan, South Korea, Hong Kong, Australia, New Zealand and throughout South and North Americas.

Sergio Barroso's music appears on the labels Areíto, SNE, Centredisc, CBC Records, Bonk, Blue Note, and Empreintes Digitales.

His music has represented both Canada and Cuba at the UNESCO TRIMALCA (1979), the UNESCO International Rostrum of Composers in Paris (1980, 1995) and the UNESCO International Rostrum of Electroacoustic Music (1990, 1994).

== Performer ==
As a keyboardist, Barroso has mainly performed his own music and has also specialized in baroque music. He has performed at the National Arts Centre (Ottawa), IRCAM and UNESCO (Paris), South Bank Centre (London, UK), Pollack Hall, Chapelle historique du Bon-Pasteur (Montréal) and Glenn Gould Studio (Toronto); as well as in Cuba, Banff, Bourges, Brussels, Calgary, Kingston, Madrid, Mexico City, Miami, Oslo, Prague, Seattle, and Vancouver. Barroso has commissioned and premiered numerous works for keyboard controlled synthesizers by Canadian composers.

== Professor ==
Sergio Barroso served as professor at the National Conservatory in Havana, Cuba from 1968 to 1973 and from 1978 to 1980. He taught at the National School of Music in Havana from 1968 to 1976, and at the University of Havana from 1976 to 1980. He was also appointed as Head of the music departments at the National Library of Havana and the Havana University; as Head of contemporary music for the Cuban Broadcasting Institute, from 1975 to 1977; and as head of music for the Ministry of Culture, Cuba from 1977 to 1980.

In 1980, Barroso established his permanent residence in Canada, and after a brief period teaching at Trent University, he moved to the West Coast to teach at the University of Victoria from 1981 to 1984, and at the Simon Fraser University in 1986. He has also taught electronic music and FM synthesis at the Mexico City National “Carlos Chávez” Conservatory.

== Awards and recognitions ==
Sergio Barroso has received numerous recognitions in Cuba, Canada, Europe, Latin America, and the USA, including awards in the Concours International de Musique Électroacoustique de Bourges (1980); the Cintas/Arts International (New York City, 1999); the International Music Council (IMC) Rostrums of Composers (Paris, 1994, 1980); the IMC Rostrums of Electroacoustic Music (TIME) (Helsinki, 1994), (Oslo, 1990); IMC Rostrum of Latin American Music (TRIMALCA, Santafé de Bogotá, 1979); the Lynch-Staunton Award (2000), and several national awards in Cuba (chamber music 1973, 74; symphonic music, 1974; choral music, 1974; electronic music, 1979).

== Other professional activities ==
Barroso has been appointed as Director of the Music departments at the Havana National “José Martí” Library (1970–72), the University of Havana (1972–76), and the Cuban Ministry of Culture (1976–80); as music writer for the Havana daily paper Juventud Rebelde (1975–80), and as broadcaster for the Cuban National Radio and Television Network (ICRT) (1969–80), and the Vancouver Cooperative Radio (1985–90). He also served as secretary-general of the Cuban section of the International Music Council (IMC) (1976–80); as an associate of the Canadian Music Centre, as a member of the Canadian League of Composers and of SOCAN, and as a founding member of the Canadian Electroacoustic Community.

== Works ==
Sergio Barroso's ample catalog include music for ballet (La Casa de Bernarda Alba, Plasmasis); for acoustic instruments or ensembles with tape or live electronics (including six works in his Yantra series, 1973–82); and purely electronic works.

Orchestra:

- Concierto, oboe, orchestra, 1967–68
- Oda al soldado muerto, large orchestra, 1968
- Concerto for String(s) and Four Sound Sources, 1972
- Yantra VII, large orchestra, 1977
- Tropical Sweet, string orchestra, 1986
- La Fiesta grande, synthesizers (1 player), orchestra, 1990
- Jitanjáfora, violin, orchestra, 1993
- Concerto, viola, orchestra, 1995–96 (also version as Viola Desnuda, viola)

Chamber:

- Cuarteto de cuerdas, string quartet, 1967
- Concierto, piano, percussion, audience, fixed media, 1968
- Yantra I, guitar, fixed media, 1972
- Yantra III, guitar, fixed media, 1972 (also version for 2 guitars, 1973)
- Yantra II, 14 winds, 1973–74
- Yantra IV, flute (+ piccolo, alto flute), fixed media, 1975
- Yantra V, guitar, 1975
- Yantra IX, soprano saxophone (+ alto saxophone), fixed media, 1979
- Yantra X, bassoon, fixed media, 1981–82
- Quince Miradas a Don Quijote, 2 guitars, 1984
- Danzas coloniales Cubanas, French horn, 2 trumpets, trombone, tuba, 1984
- En febrero mueren las flores, violin, fixed media, 1987
- Canzona, synthesizers (1 player), fixed media, 1988
- La Fiesta, synthesizers (1 player), fixed media, 1989
- Crónicas de ultrasueño, oboe/clarinet/trumpet, synthesizers (1 player)/fixed media, 1992
- Sonatada, synthesizers (1 player), 1992
- Charangas delirantes, synthesizers (3 players), 1993 (also version for synthesizers [1 player], fixed media, 1993)
- Viejas voces, viola, fixed media, 1993–94
- Crónicas II, viola, synthesizers (1 player)/fixed media, 1995
- Viola Desnuda, viola, 1995–97 (version of Concerto)
- La Noche, bass clarinet, viola, fixed media, 1997 (also versions for bass oboe, bass clarinet, fixed media, 1997; 2 bass clarinets, fixed media, 1997; fixed media)
- Sandunga, viola, fixed media, 1997 (also version for clarinet, fixed media, 1997)
- Cuartetas, bass clarinet, viola, piano, synthesizers (1 player)/fixed media, 1999
- Callejos, bass clarinet, fixed media, 1999
- Pregones, cello, fixed media, 2000
- Rocambole, violin/viola, cello, fixed media, 2001
- Hélice, soprano saxophone, fixed media, 2003–05

Vocal:

- El Ángel desengañado (text by Rafael Alberti), alto, piano, 1963
- Tres Canciones azules (text by Rafael Alberti), soprano, piano, 1963
- Tres Canciones grises (text by Federico García Lorca), alto, piano, 1963
- Grietas (text by Xiomara Funes), soprano, piano, 1965
- Noema II, voice, guitar, violin, double bass, piano, fixed media, 1972
- Ireme, mezzo-soprano, percussion, fixed media, 1975 (concert version of ballet)
- Verdehalago (text by Mariano Brull), high soprano, alto flute (+ piccolo), violin, double bass, percussion, live electronics, 2004–06

Piano:

- Microsuite, 1965
- Variaciones del Motoriongo, 1966
- Música para pequeños oídos, 1966
- Yantra VIII, 1978
- Yantra VI, piano, fixed media, 1976–79
- Liborio, piano, fixed media, 2008

Electroacoustic:

- Las Barricadas misteriosas, fixed media, 1982
- Soledad, fixed media, 1987
- Tablao, guitar ad libitum, fixed media, 1991
- La Noche, fixed media, 1997 (version of chamber work)

Stage:

- Plásmasis (ballet, choreography by Alicia Alonso), orchestra, fixed media, 1970
- Dinamia (ballet), fixed media, 1972
- La Casa de Bernarda Alba (ballet, choreography by Alicia Alonso, after Federico García Lorca), small orchestra (14 winds, 8 brass), fixed media, 1971–75
- Ireme (ballet, texts from Abakuá folklore from Cuba), mezzo-soprano, percussion, fixed media, 1975 (may be performed as a concert work)
- Neverland (dance music), fixed media, 1976
- The Tempest (incidental music, play by William Shakespeare), fixed media, 1984

Multimedia:

Rumbos, fixed media, slide projections (by Sandú Darié), 1975

== Discography ==
- Variaciones del Motoriongo. Nancy Casanovas, piano (Areíto: LDA-3589) (LP)
- Concierto (piano, percussion, audience, fixed media); Yantra I; Yantra IV. Luis Bayard, flute, piccolo, alto flute; Flores Chaviano, guitar; Sergio Barroso/percussion of the Orquesta Sinfónica de La Habana (Areíto: LDA-3631) (LP)
- Yantra III (original version). Flores Chaviano, guitar (Areíto: LDA-3721) (LP)
- Yantra VIII. Ileana Peña, piano (Areíto: LDA-3800) (LP)
- Oda al soldado muerto. Enrique González Mántici/Orquesta Sinfónica de La Habana (Areíto: LDA-7000) (LP)
- Crónicas de ultrasueño (version with oboe). Lawrence Cherney, oboe; Sergio Barroso, synthesizers (Centrediscs: CMCCD 4793)
- La Fiesta; Crónicas de ultrasueño (version with oboe); En febrero mueren las flores; Charangas delirantes; Sonatada; Viejas voces; Tablao (version for fixed media); Yantra X; Canzona. León Biriotti, oboe; Jesse Read, bassoon; Adele Armin, violin; Laura Wilcox, viola; Sergio Barroso, synthesizers (empreintes DIGITALes: IMED 9628/29)
- Yantra I; Yantra III (original version); Yantra IV; Yantra VI; Yantra IX. Luis Bayard, flute, piccolo, alto flute; Miguel Villafruela, soprano saxophone, alto saxophone; Flores Chaviano, guitar; Jorge Gomez Labraña, piano (IREME: 19732001)
- La Noche (version for fixed media); En febrero mueren las flores; Sandunga (original version); Las Barricadas misteriosas. Adele Armin, violin; Laura Wilcox, viola (IREME: 19822002)
- Concerto (viola); Jitanjáfora; La Casa de Bernarda Alba (excerpts). Adele Armin, violin; Laura Wilcox, viola; Alex Pauk/Esprit Orchestra; Sergio Barroso/Orquesta Sinfónica de la Ópera Cubana (IREME: 19962001)
- La Fiesta. Sergio Barroso, synthesizers (Radio Canada International: ACM-37)
- Soledad; Canzona. Sergio Barroso, synthesizers (Société nouvelle d’enregistrement: SNE 556)
- Viola Desnuda. Laura Wilcox, viola (Société nouvelle d’enregistrement: SNE 654)

== See also ==
Music of Cuba
