= James Balfour (architect) =

Canadian architect (1854–1917)

- Born: 1854; Hamilton, Canada West
- Died: 1917 (aged 62–63); Hamilton, Ontario
- Occupation: Architect
- Practice: Hamilton, Ontario

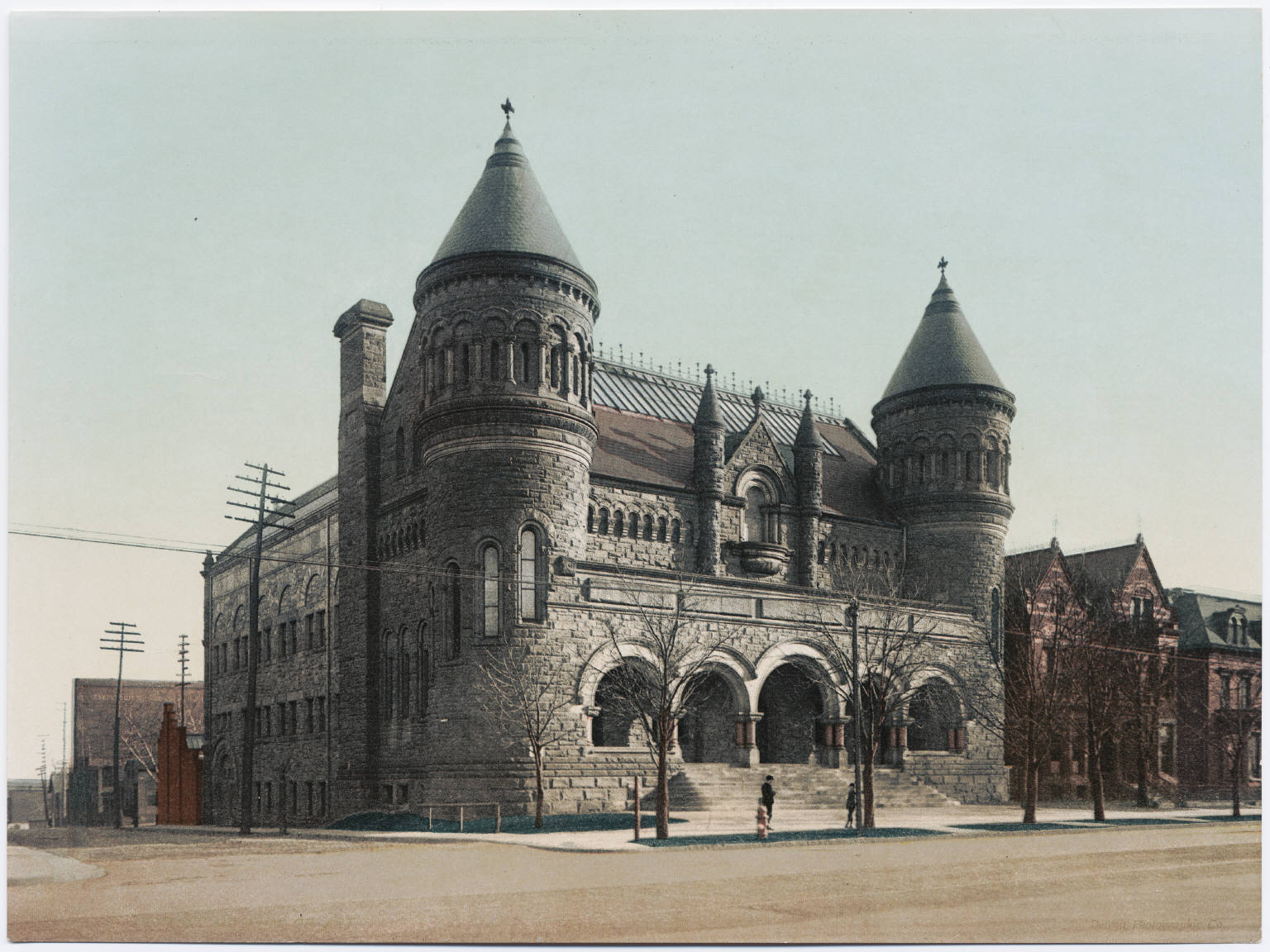
Detroit Museum of Art, dedicated 1888. Jefferson and Hastings Street

James Balfour (1854–1917) was a Canadian architect. He designed a number of buildings in Ontario and a museum in Detroit. His larger buildings were of the Romanesque style, revived around 1870 by Henry Hobson Richardson.

He was born in Hamilton in what was then Canada West. He was the son of Peter Balfour, a Hamilton alderman and carpenter. He was educated in Hamilton and studied architecture with the firm of Peddie & Kinnear in Edinburgh, Scotland. Before returning to Hamilton, he worked in New York City for several years.

The first professional mention of Balfour in Hamilton is Hamilton's 1876–77 city directory. The house still standing at 250 James Street South was one of his early designs.

He designed Tuckett Mansion, on the corner of King Street and Queen Street in Hamilton. Completed in 1896, it was built for George Elias Tuckett, founder of Tuckett Tobacco and the 27th mayor of Hamilton. It now forms a portion of the complex known as the Scottish Rite.

He also designed Hamilton's City Hall, on the corner of James Street and York Boulevard. It was completed in 1888; it was demolished in 1961, although the clock tower was incorporated into the new construction.

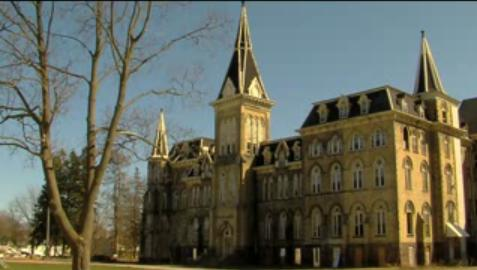
Alma College in St. Thomas, Ontario

Balfour was also successful outside of Hamilton. In 1878–1882 he designed and oversaw construction of an all-girl school, Alma College in St. Thomas, Ontario (1878–1881) and later additions (1888–89). The college was destroyed by a fire on May 28, 2008.

In March 1887 he won the design competition for the Detroit Museum of Art. His entry was entitled "Wisdom, Strength, and Beauty". It was a Romanesque structure that was dedicated September 1, 1888. It was demolished in 1960.
