= Alma College (St. Thomas, Ontario) =

Former private school in St. Thomas, Ontario

Coordinates: 42.773315°N 81.190869°W

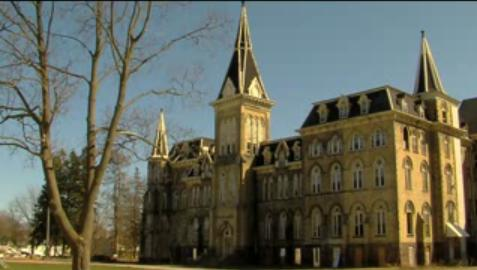
- Romanesque style School designed by James Balfour 1877, destroyed by fire in 2008
- Date: Fire on May 28th 2008
- Location: St. Thomas, Ontario
- Outcome: Destroyed by arson
- Website: Alumnae home page

Alma College was a girls' private school in St. Thomas, Ontario, in Canada. Built in 1878, the school was in operation between 1881 and 1988. The college closed in 1988 in part due to a teacher's strike. Primary school and music classes were still taught on campus until 1994. Following its closure the school building was used as a set for several movie productions; Silent Hill (interior shots), its image is included in the 2009 film Orphan and the made-for-TV movie, Mr. Headmistress (1997). The building was destroyed by a fire on May 28, 2008.

== History (1877–1996) ==
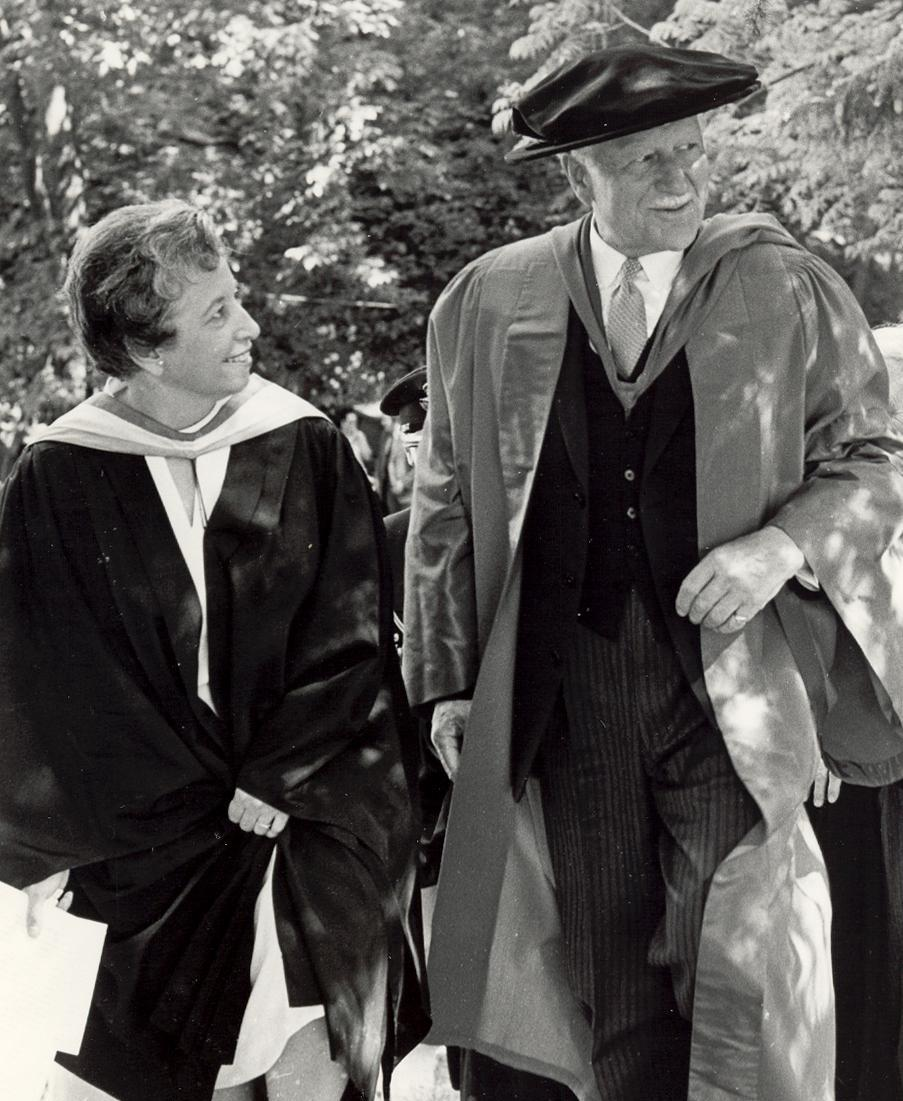
Governor General Roland Michener attending the Alma College graduation ceremonies in 1972

With the economic boom of St. Thomas in the late 19th century, Bishop Albert Carman proposed that a ladies' college be established. The school name derives from the late Alma Munro (Moore) (wife of then Sheriff Colin Munroe) and Mrs. Alma Munro Duffield, daughter of Colin and Alma.

Alma college was officially opened in 1881 as a liberal arts college for women, teaching literature, arts and music. By 1883, it had 165 students. The school's traditional colors were chosen based on each of these subjects: blue (literature), gold (art), and crimson (music).

James Balfour designed the Alma Ladies College building (1878–81) and the additions (1888-89). Construction was done by Henry Lindop of St. Thomas at an estimated total cost of about CA$50,000 (equivalent to $2,093,693 in 2025). The grounds featured a main building, a chapel, a hall cum gymnasium, and a unique outdoor amphitheater. In its later years, the college was affiliated with the University of Western Ontario, and was the first college in Canada to organize a department of domestic science.

Between 1918 and 1953, new athletic facilities, a chapel and the amphitheater were constructed. In 1959, a music building was constructed. By 1973, the school began to experience a significant financial struggle to continue operation. In 1975, a portion of the residence was opened as a satellite seniors home for a local long term care facility. That same year a co-ed elementary school was established on campus.

In October 1976, the college was designated a provincial historic site to celebrate the school's centennial. In 1987, Alma college teachers faced job security issues and were earning about half of what public high school teachers earned.

After failed negotiations with Alma's board, the Ontario Labour Relations Board (OLRB) approved the private school bargaining unit of Alma's teachers. In February 1988, the first strike by members of a private school in Ontario was called and in March replacement workers were used to teach classes at the school. The strike lasted just over three months, with the OLRB ruling that the Alma Board was guilty of unfair labor practices. At the end of the academic year, all teachers were told that their services were no longer needed as the school was closing. (The Alma bargaining movement would continue to be active until as late as 1998.) Primary and music classes continued until 1994. In 1994, a last effort to reopen the school was unsuccessful due to low enrollment.

== Building demise (1996–2008) ==
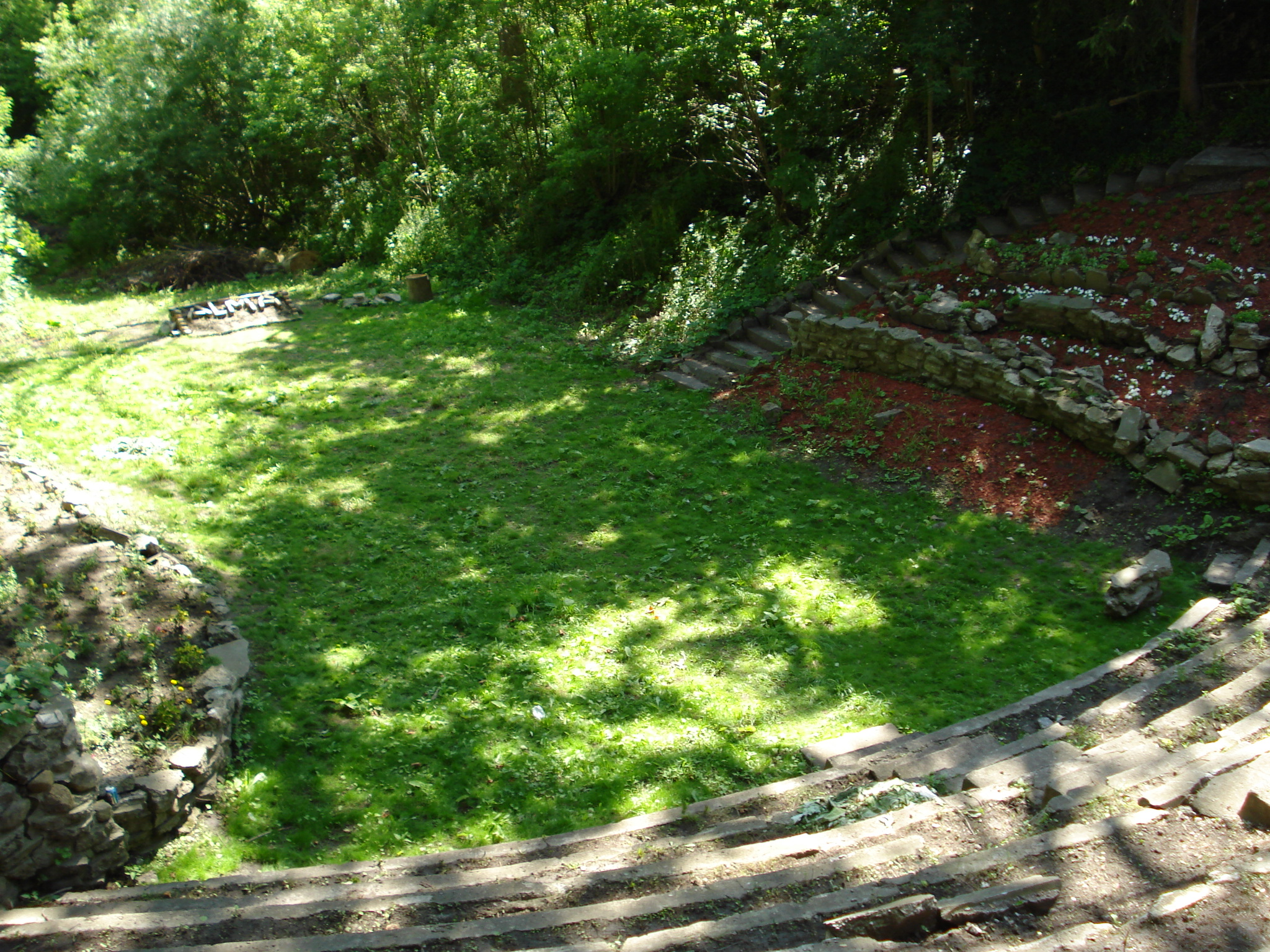
Alma College amphitheatre as of Summer 2008 after restoration. The amphitheatre has since been vandalized and fallen into disrepair

The school grounds and buildings were sold to private developers in 1996 for CA$1.5 million. Alma College changed ownership several times after failed attempts to convert the grounds into a retirement home, a co-ed high school, or an otherwise general restoration of the buildings.

Initially after closure the buildings were sold to Royal Cambridge in 1996. The developer initially planned to restore the buildings and open a co-ed school. Shortly after the production of Mr Headmistress, an ABC made-for-TV movie was made where various outdoor improvements were made to the building as well as restoration of ground work surrounding the structure. Nearly one month after production of the film, Royal Cambridge defaulted on the mortgage payments for the property. This caused the building to be for sale once again. A London development company led by Brian Squires purchased the College and developed plans to build a retirement community on the campus in 1998. Over the next four years, he spent time preparing the site and arranging financing. At this point the school began to see a wave of vandalism due to general un-occupancy. By 2003, Squires applied for a demolition permit (suggested by the mayor and recorded) due to the fact that the Mayor at the time said the building could not be saved and the land is better suited for redevelopment. The Mayor commented the people of St.Thomas would eventually understand if the building was demolished. Squires was devastated that the mayor would say such a thing after committing to help save it during the November elections. He then quickly filed for a demolition permit to prove the mayor was wrong in saying the people of St.Thomas would not be upset if such an action was able to take place. At the same time, he hired a structural engineer to confirm that it could be saved. The Mayor's office was swamped with calls supporting the saving of the building. The demolition permit application was denied by the local municipality because of the structural report provided by Squires. A demolition permit was never issued and the building was saved. Squires continued to try and save the building putting all his resources into it. Shortly after that, Squires handed over control of the project to the Zubick family because of lack of interest from the family, municipality and bankers. The building was gutted; asbestos, general fixtures and walls were all removed leaving little but a timber frame inside the building. The ghostly innards were used for the film Silent Hill in 2005. Once again, a demolition permit was issued for Alma College after more attempts to sell the building were unsuccessful. In 2006, the Municipal Heritage Committee recommended that the demolition permit be denied, and that City Council prescribe minimum standards for maintenance of the building under section 35.3 of the Ontario Heritage Act. They also recommended that the city seek further financial assistance from the provincial Ministry of Heritage. This report would subsequently be buried by the ministry of culture only to reappear under the freedom of information act two years later and after the buildings eventual demise. the city denied the demolition permit and the building was placed on the National top ten endangered historic sites in Canada.

By 2006, an offer was made by the Alma College foundation, a group of alumnae, university academics and community leaders in the hopes of reopening as a liberal arts college. Their offer was CA$750,000, but this was rejected by the Zubick family. With the building being allowed to fall into further disrepair, the City Council developed new property standards by laws in order to establish minimum standards. This new bylaw was protested and ruled to be too specific in wording and was overturned by the Ontario Supreme Court. The city eventually agreed to offer a demolition permit on the condition that the front driveway be preserved and the front façade, a sentiment that is still considered valid even though today the building was destroyed. In early 2008, the Ontario Municipal Board approved the demolition of Alma College. This would set off a rush to protect the building by many local activists. On May 28, 2008, a petition was set to be passed around at the Ontario Legislature to prevent the demolition of the building. In addition a rally to save the college was also planned that morning at the Main building of the school.

== Fire and grounds destruction (2008–present) ==
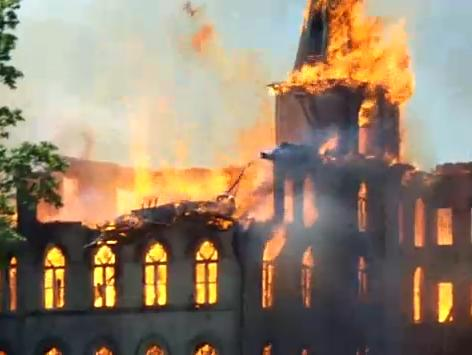
Fire at Alma College in May 2008. After the fire only a brick shell remained. It was subsequently demolished.

Alma College caught fire on May 28, 2008. The fire was suspicious in nature. The smoke could be seen as far away as downtown London, Ontario. Shortly after the fire began the main building was completely engulfed. A significant amount of video coverage of the fire is available due to a student rally to save the building which took place shortly before the fire. After the fire, both a municipal and provincial investigation were commenced immediately.

The fire took place shortly after the Ontario Municipal Board issued a final order that approved its demolition. Just prior to the time of the fire, local residents met with officials of Premier Dalton McGuinty's office in hopes of postponing an eventual demolition. Local response was swift to place blame on the Ontario Minister of Culture Aileen Carroll, at the time for not working hard enough to protect the building from demolition.

Documentation released through the Ontario Freedom of Information and Protection of Privacy Act a month after the fire indicated a report from the Ontario Heritage Trust board had been addressed to the Ministry of Culture. The report outlined that the ministry should ensure that should Alma fall under the threat of demolition or alteration that would compromise the heritage character, integrity and attributes of the property, that it would be appropriate for the minister to designate Alma College, using the powers prescribed under the Ontario Heritage Act, to protect the building.

At the time of the fire, the building was completely open and exposed to numerous fire hazards. Timber members within the structure had no fire protection and numerous broken windows allowed a proper flow of ventilation only to encourage the fire. The main school building was destroyed by fire. An investigation by the St Thomas city fire department found the blaze, which began in the building's rear stairwell, was the result of arson.

The music building and chapel were not destroyed immediately by the fire. The response to the fire was fast enough that the local fire department was able to save the music building. However weathering, vandalism, and neglect continue to further damage the surviving structures since the fire. After the fire, the remaining shell of the main building was torn down due to safety considerations by the municipal government of the city of St Thomas. Shortly after the fire two boys were arrested and charged with arson. The identity of both boys (aged 14 and 15 at the time of the fire) could not be revealed under the Youth Criminal Justice Act. The trial occurred on August 10–13 and September 2–3, 2009. In a ruling on September 24, 2009, the two boys were found guilty of arson and sentenced to 240 hours of community service and two years parole.

After the fire, a short speech was given at the Ontario legislature by speaker Steve Peters in memory of the building and loss to the culture of his home. The main building topped Heritages Canada's list for worst losses in 2008.

== Student life ==
Student run publications were always popular at Alma. In 1903 a quarterly magazine was developed entitled ALMA consisting of articles written by staff and students. The Almafilian was the colleges first student newspaper published monthly from 1886 to 1917, and then serving as the year book published annually until the schools closure. Various dramatic plays, banquets, recitals and dances were held annually on campus. In 1878 a metallic box time capsule was placed in a cornerstone of the building which would remain undisturbed until 2002. In the time capsule a copy of the local newspapers (St. Thomas and London) of the time were stored, church literature, photographs, postcards, and a list of people who contributed to the college's cornerstone. The time capsule today is housed in the Elgin County Archives.

The amphitheater was a popular site for ceremonies including graduations and marriages. The school kept a marriage register from 1928 to 1994. Each May Day from 1931 until 1988 the amphitheater was used for musical and dramatic performances.

== International Alumnae Association ==
Alma college's alumni association can be traced back to February 1901 as Alma's Daughters. The first organization of the alumnae consisted of former staff and students and was formed by Emma Sisk, a former governess of the College. In 1908 the charter of the school was amended to include Alma's Daughters as the official alumni of the school by allowing them to elect members to the Alma college Board of Management. Due to increasing membership the Alumnae officially changed its name in 1931 to the Alma College Alumnae. various local chapters began to appear throughout Ontario shortly after and eventually international chapters developed such as the Bermuda chapter in 1988 In its form today the Alma College International Alumnae association still gathers annually. The alumni has been very active in preserving the cultural heritage of artifacts related to the history of the building. These primarily are numerous artifacts and relics that were collected from previous alumni and from the school itself. In 1997 a group of Alumni investors purchased the remaining chattels and memorabilia. This was complemented by storage space being granted at the local community city hall by then mayor and past archivist, Steve Peters. The archives were stored safely in the City hall until Steve Peters took provincial office, upon which the archives were moved to a temporary home. In 2002 The alumnae decided to move the archives to a more permanent home at The Elgin County Museum, located just outside St Thomas. Many historical records and photographs were published online by the museum. To date a description of the records can be found on the web, as well as a collection of photographs of the school in its early years at the Museum's website.

== Role in film ==
Alma College was featured in three films after its closure in 1995. The first film was Mr HeadMistress, a made-for-TV movie by Disney which starred Katey Sagal in 1997. The film used the main building as a backdrop and surroundings grounds. Some building maintenance was performed at this time in order to bring the building up to par for filming. After significant portions of building were gutted the interior became an ideal set for the horror film Silent Hill. Even after its destruction, photographs and its likeness were included in the 2009 film Orphan, portraying it as a mental hospital named the Saarne Institute which is located in Estonia. The film featured a painting of the building in flames.

== Notable alumnae and faculty ==
- Frances Adaskin pianist and Order of Canada CC
- Margaret Avison Order of Canada OC, was a Canadian poet who attended Alma College in 1935. She was a two time winner of the Governor General's Award
- Jean Sutherland Boggs Order of Canada CC, FRSC was a Canadian academic, art historian, and civil servant.
- Eva Brook Donly artist who graduated from Alma College in 1886 and was an art teacher at Alma from 1887 to 1890. Donly's former home in Simcoe, Ontario, in now the Eva Brook Donly Museum.
- Idabelle Smith Firestone composer and songwriter who was the wife of businessman Harvey S. Firestone. Founder of the Firestone Tire and Rubber Company
- Pamela Gordon, Premier of Bermuda DBE 1997-98. The first woman to hold the office
- Beatrice Nasmyth graduated from Alma College in 1903. Nasymth was a suffragette and reporter with the Vancouver Province. She was a war correspondent during the First World War and was one of the few women journalists to report on the Versailles Peace Conference
- Steve Peters, generally considered an honorary alumnus, worked at Alma College. He was Speaker of the Ontario Legislature from 2007 to 2011
- Judge Edra Sanders, graduated from Alma College in 1927. She was the first woman to practice law in St. Thomas and the first woman to be elected alderman of that city. Edra was also the first woman to run for mayor of St. Thomas, Ontario. In 1972, she was the first judge to be appointed to the Small Claims Court of Ontario. In 2011, she became the oldest ever recipient of the Order of Canada
- Frederic Marlett Bell-Smith RCA artist known primarily for his paintings of Canadian landscapes particularly the Rocky Mountains. He was also the first Canadian artist to be granted a sitting with Queen Victoria in 1895. Smith was the first Director of Fine Arts at Alma College.
- Frank Welsman music director from 1928 to 1931. Founder of the original Toronto Symphony Orchestra
- Sarah Agnes Wintemute Coates, missionary educator in Japan

== See also ==
- St. Thomas, Ontario
- List of historic fires
- Benjamin Fish Austin
