= Carol Welsman =

Canadian pianist

- Born: Carol Welsman; September 29, 1960 (age 65); Toronto, Ontario, Canada
- Genres: Jazz
- Occupation: Musician
- Instruments: Vocals, piano
- Years active: 1995–present
- Label: Welcar Music
- Website: carolwelsman.com

Carol Welsman (born September 29, 1960) is a Canadian jazz pianist who accompanies her own easy listening, conversational style singing. She is the granddaughter of the founder and first conductor of the first Toronto Symphony Orchestra, Frank Welsman, and is the sister of composer John Welsman. She has been nominated six times for a Juno Award, Canada's equivalent to the Grammy.

== Career ==
Born in Toronto, Welsman studied classical piano as a child. She attended the Berklee College of Music in Boston, majoring in piano performance. After receiving a grant from the Canada Council for the Arts, Carol studied voice in Paris with Christiane Legrand. In 1990 Welsman returned to Toronto and joined the jazz performance faculty at the University of Toronto, giving private lessons and developing a vocal jazz improvisation ensemble.

In 1995 she released her first album, Lucky to Be Me, containing jazz standards and her own song "This Lullaby", which she presented on September 11, 2004, on the Larry King TV show commemorating the 3rd anniversary of 9/11. The song was also recorded by Celine Dion on her 2004 "Miracle" album as "Baby, Close Your Eyes".

Welsman has written lyrics for Ray Charles and Nicole Scherzinger.

Her 2009 album I Like Men: Reflections of Miss Peggy Lee was voted Top 5 Album Pick of the Year 2009 in USA Today. On April 30, 2010, she appeared on Marian McPartland's Piano Jazz and was interviewed by guest host Jon Weber.

With Herbie Hancock she hosted the 2000 Billboard Jazz Awards. In 2005 she was the star of a documentary, The Language of Love. Filmed in Brazil, Italy, and North America, she performed with Herbie Hancock, Djavan, and Romano Musumarra. Welsman sings in English, Portuguese, French, Italian and Spanish. A Berklee Distinguished Alumnus, Welsman is considered to be one of Canada's premier jazz vocalists and pianists.

== Discography ==
- Just Imagination (Columbia/EMI, 1987)
- Lucky to Be Me (Welcar, 1996)
- Swing Ladies, Swing! (Welcar, 1998)
- Inclined (Justin Time, 1997)
- Hold Me (Avenue Jazz 2001)
- The Language of Love (Savoy 2002)
- What'cha Got Cookin'? (Koch 2006)
- Carol Welsman (Justin Time, 2007)
- I Like Men (Welcar, 2009)
- Memories of You (Fab, 2009)
- Journey (Justin Time, 2012)
- Alone Together (Welcar, 2015)
- For You (Welcar, 2017)
- Dance With Me (Welcar, 2020)
