= Frances Adaskin =

Canadian pianist

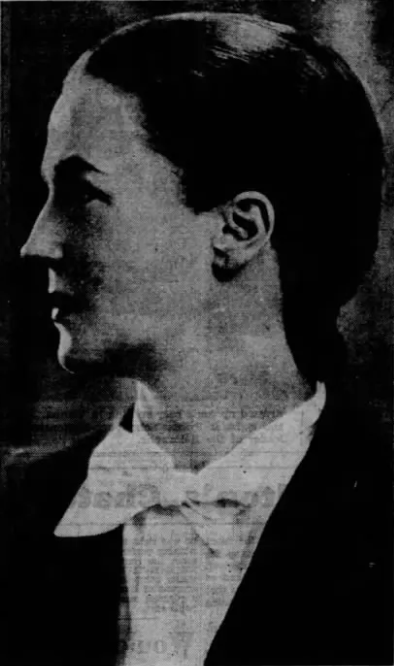
- Frances Adaskin (1934)

Background information
- Born: Frances Alice Marr; August 23, 1900; Ridgetown, Ontario, Canada
- Died: March 8, 2001 (aged 100) Vancouver, British Columbia, Canada
- Occupations: Musician, entertainment writer
- Instrument: Piano

Frances Alice Adaskin, CM (née Marr; August 23, 1900 – March 8, 2001) was a Canadian pianist.

== Biography ==
Adaskin was born Frances Alice Marr in Ridgetown, Ontario. She was the daughter of Del and Eunice Marr and the eldest of three siblings. She also began playing the piano at an early age under the direction of Whitney Scherer. She studied at the Alma College and, later, at the Toronto Conservatory of Music under Paul Wells.

In 1923, her first engagement as a professional accompanist was with violinist Harry Adaskin (died April 7, 1994). They became a duo and wed in 1926. The couple travelled until 1938 on tour of North America and Europe with the Hart House String Quartet.

Adaskin was also an entertainment writer (mostly of short stories). Many of her works were published in Saturday Night Magazine throughout the 1940s. (Note: It is unclear what publication of Saturday Night Adaskin was published in the 1940s.) She also completed her unpublished memoirs, titled Fran's Scrapbook: A Talking Dream. (Note: Fran's Scrapbook: A Talking Dream her autobiographical book of memoirs remain unpublished as at 2002.)

== Accolades ==
Adaskin received the Order of Canada honour on December 15, 1976. It was awarded for "...a life devoted to music as accompanist of international repute and as a soloist and teacher..." She was invested as a Member on April 29, 1977.

In 2024 she was posthumously inducted into the Chatham-Kent Cultural Hall of Fame for her contributions to music as a pianist and teacher.

== Death ==
Frances Adaskin died in Vancouver on March 8, 2001, aged 100.
