= The Peace Tree =

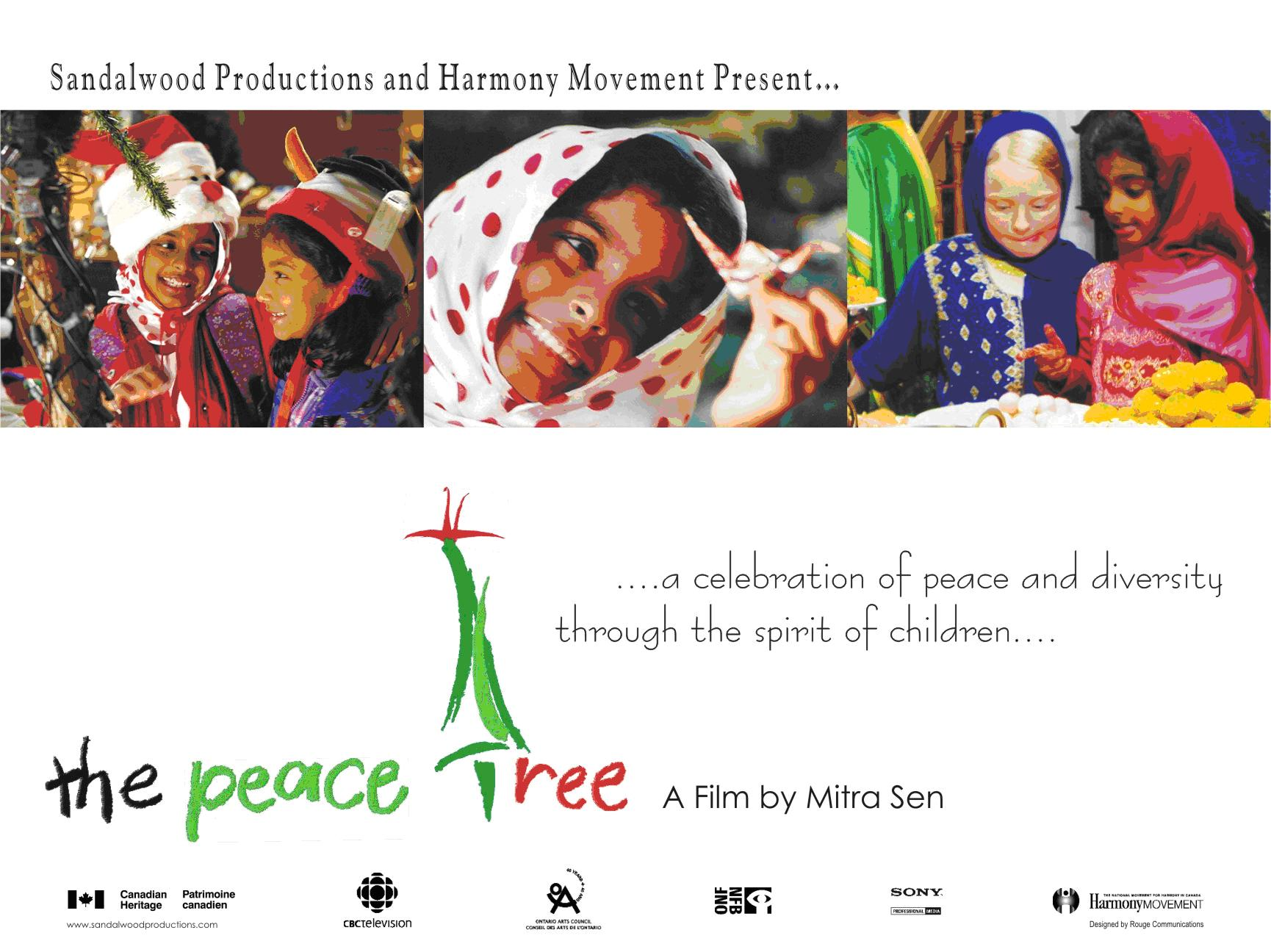
- Directed by: Mitra Sen
- Written by: Mitra Sen
- Produced by: Mitra Sen
- Starring: Aiishwariya Haran; Jacoba Barber-Rozema; Sonika Ramachandran
- Cinematography: Philip Earnshaw
- Music by: John Welsman
- Release date: 2005
- Running time: 48 minutes
- Country: Canada
- Language: English

The Peace Tree is a 2005 family film produced, written and directed by Canadian filmmaker Mitra Sen.

== Plot ==
The Peace Tree tells the story of two little girls, one Muslim and one Christian, who dream of celebrating each other's festivals, Eid and Christmas. But when they share their dreams, they are met with resistance from their parents who express their concerns. Through their struggles, they create a unique symbol—The Peace Tree, a tree that highlights the symbols from all our cultures and faiths to reflect the beauty of "diversity in unity". The Peace Tree shares the voices of the children who try to enlighten their parents to the importance of sharing and celebrating diversity together.

== Production ==
The film was produced, written and directed by Mitra Sen, under Sandalwood Productions in association with Harmony Movement and CBC.

== Release ==
The Peace Tree was screened at over 50 film festivals, including Tribeca Film Festival, and received twelve international awards.

== Impact ==
The film triggered the creation of Peace Trees internationally, and the proclamation of Peace Tree Day on June 1, 2006, by Mayor David Miller in Toronto. In 2007, York Region, York Regional Police, York Region District School Board and the City of Windsor proclaimed Peace Tree Day.

== Awards and recognition ==
- Liv Ullmann Peace Prize, 22nd Chicago International Film Festival
- Children's Film Festival for promoting peace and harmony
- Audience Award, Taiwan International Children's Film and Television Film Festival 2006
- Nominated Best Feature, Taiwan International Children's Film and Television Festival 2006
- Silver Cairo for Short Film, Cairo International Film Festival for Children 2006
- Children's International Jury Prize, Cairo
- International Film Festival for Children 2006
- Best Short Fiction, Lamatatena Cine por Ninos et Ninas, Mexico, 2006
- Best Short Family Film, Sarasota Film Festival 2006
- Best Children's Film, Sun Valley Spiritual Film Festival 2006
- Gold Statue, Best Direction, Roshd International Film Festival, Iran, 2006
- Gold Statue, Best Script, Roshd International Film Festival, Iran, 2006
- Gold Statue, Best Acting, Roshd International Film Festival, Iran, 2006
- S-VOX (Vision TV)/ReelWorld Film Festival, Spiritual Film Award, 2007
- Golden Minbar International Film Festival, Kazan, Russia, President of the Republic of Tartasan, Award for Humanity in Film Art, 2007
