= John Welsman =

Canadian composer (born 1955)

- Born: 1955 (age 70–71); Toronto, Ontario
- Education: Royal Conservatory of Music
- Occupation: Composer

John Joseph Welsman (born 1955) is a Canadian composer known for his work in film and television. He has written film and television scores for production companies in both Canada and the United States. Some of the films he has worked on are The Peace Tree, A Winter Tale, and Nurse.Fighter.Boy and Lantern Hill. He has been nominated for the Gemini Award ten times, winning four times for his work on the television series Road to Avonlea, and once for the short film 'The Bellringer'.

== Early life and education ==
Welsman was born in Toronto. He is the grandson of conductor Frank Welsman and the brother of jazz singer Carol Welsman. He studied piano and theory at the Royal Conservatory of Music, Toronto, and attended the University of Western Ontario in 1974 and 1975. He studied music composition with Samuel Dolin and Milan Kymlicka.

== Career ==
In the late 1970s and early 1980s, Welsman was a member of the folk and roots band Available Space with Cherie Camp and Jeff Kahnert.

Welsman conducted and created arrangements for the string orchestra which recorded on Loreena McKennitt's 1994 album The Mask and Mirror. Also in the 1990s Welsman composed and arranged extensively for the television series Road to Avonlea.

Welsman has also composed music for several other television series including Franklin and Friends, My Pet Monster (as well as the live action direct to video special of the same name), Physic Investigators, The War of the Worlds, Freaky Stories, CBC's Magic Hour, The Mighty Jungle, By Way of the Stars and the 1980s Twilight Zone series.

Welsman's song "Oh Love", co-written with Camp for the film Nurse.Fighter.Boy, was named Best Original Song at the 30th Genie Awards. That year he also provided the score for the teenage adventure film Modra.

Welsman co-wrote a song, "Morning Light", for the Toronto band Men in Suits, who perform to raise money for charity.

In 2015 Welsman was named president of the Screen Composers Guild of Canada. Welsman wrote the score for the film Kingston Paradise, which was shown at the Cannes Film Festival, the Trinidad and Tobago Film Festival, and the Caribbean Tales Film Festival in 2015.
