= Harry Adaskin =

Canadian violinist, academic, and radio broadcaster

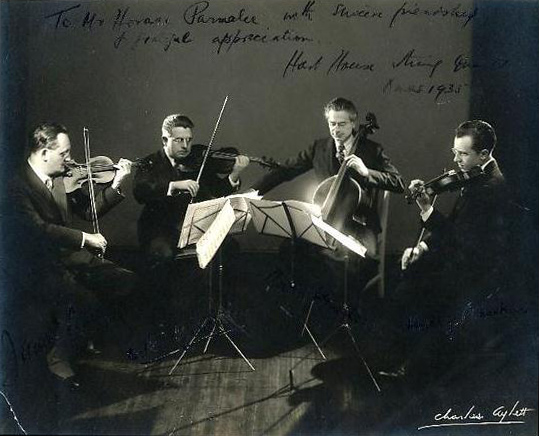
- Hart House String Quartet in their 1935 configuration (James Levey, Milton Blackstone, Boris Hambourg and Harry Adaskin). The autograph addresses their manager Horace Parmalee.

Background information
- Born: Harijs Adaskins; 6 October 1901; Riga, Russian Empire
- Origin: Toronto, Ontario, Canada
- Died: 7 April 1994 (aged 92) Vancouver, British Columbia, Canada
- Occupations: Academic, radio broadcaster
- Instrument: Violin

Harry Adaskin (Latvian: Harijs Adaskins; 6 October 1901 – 7 April 1994) was a Canadian violinist, academic, and radio broadcaster.

== History ==
Born to a Jewish family in Riga, in the Governorate of Livonia of the Russian Empire (present-day Latvia), he emigrated with his family to Toronto. At the age of twelve, he started at the Toronto Conservatory of Music, and at the age of 16 became a member of Frank Welsman's Toronto Symphony Orchestra. He later studied at the Hamburger Konservatorium with Henri Czaplinski. In 1923, he formed the Hart House String Quartet and played second violin.

He was the host of several CBC Radio programs, including Musically Speaking and Tuesday Night.

From 1946 to 1958, he was the head of the new Department of Music at the University of British Columbia and taught there until his retirement in 1973. In 1977, he wrote the first part of his autobiography, A Fiddler's World – Memoirs to 1938 and in 1982, he wrote the second part to his autobiography, A Fiddler's Choice – Memoirs from 1938 Til 1980.

He is the brother of Murray Adaskin. In 1926, he married Frances Adaskin.

It was announced 18 December 1974 that he was awarded the Order of Canada. On 16 April 1975, Adaskin was invested as an Officer of the Order of Canada.

Adaskin died 7 April 1994 Vancouver, British Columbia, Canada.
