= Clifford Poole =

British-Canadian pianist, conductor, composer (1916–2003)

- Born: 25 May 1916; Reddish, Lancashire, England
- Died: 16 July 2003 (aged 87) Toronto, Ontario, Canada
- Genre: Classical
- Years active: 1936–1999

Clifford Poole (1916–2003) was a British-Canadian music teacher, composer, conductor and contributor to music.

== Early life and education ==
Poole was born in Reddish, England, near Manchester. Poole's family emigrated to Canada in his early years. Poole studied piano with Mona Bates.

== Career ==
Poole and Gordon Hallett performed in Toronto and Montreal in the late 1930s as the Poole–Hallett duo; the pair also performed on CBC Radio. Drafted into military service during World War II, Poole performed during periods of leave.

Poole was a guest performer with the Montreal Women's Symphony Orchestra in 1946. Around that time he also performed as a duo with his wife, pianist Margaret Parsons. In 1948 the pair joined the faculty of the School of Music at Western University.

Poole taught piano at the Royal Conservatory of Music of Toronto (now The Royal Conservatory of Music). Beginning in 1963 he taught at the University of Toronto, and was later active in composition and services to orchestras. His compositions were performed by the East York Symphony Orchestra.

Poole served as conductor of the York Symphony Orchestra (1973–89), and the Scarborough Philharmonic Orchestra (1980–85). He founded the Cathedral Bluffs Symphony Orchestra and was its inaugural conductor from 1985 until 1999. During this period he also created teaching material for music students.

== Musical works ==
Poole's modern classical music has featured in selections by the Royal Conservatory of Music.
