= Murray Adaskin =

Canadian violinist, teacher and composer

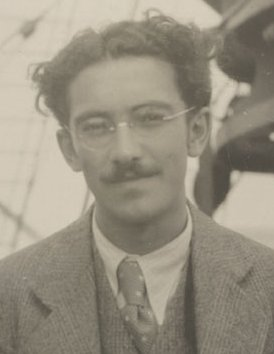
- Adaskin in 1929

Background information
- Born: March 28, 1906; Toronto, Ontario
- Died: May 6, 2002 (aged 96) Victoria, British Columbia
- Occupations: Violinist, teacher, composer

Murray Adaskin (March 28, 1906 – May 6, 2002) was a Canadian violinist, teacher, and composer.

== Biography ==
Born in Toronto to Latvian Jewish immigrant parents, Adaskin was introduced to the violin by his brother, Harry; he also studied in Paris with Marcel Chailley (1929), and in Toronto with Luigi von Kunits, William Primrose (1937), and Kathleen Parlow (1941-43). His professional career began with playing accompaniment music for silent movies in theatres. He also was a member of the Toronto Symphony Orchestra from 1923-36. From 1938-52, he led the Toronto Trio at the Royal York Hotel, playing the Stradivarius that been gifted to him.

During the 1940s, he commenced compositional studies with John Weinzweig, Charles Jones and Darius Milhaud at the Music Academy of the West. From 1952-66, he headed the music department at the University of Saskatchewan, where he continued as composer-in-residence until 1972; he also conducted the Saskatoon Symphony from 1957-60. Among his notable pupils were composers Boyd McDonald, Paul Pedersen, Rodney Sharman and Timothy Williams, and violinist Andrew Dawes. A founding member of the Canadian League of Composers, Adaskin composed more than half of his oeuvre of 130 compositions after retiring to Victoria in 1973.

The Order of Canada was conferred on him in 1980.

The Adaskin portrait in the Canadian Composers Portraits series was released in 2002.

He died in Victoria on May 6, 2002.

Adaskin was married (1931) to soprano Frances James. After her death in 1988, he married Dorothea Larsen, who helped to produce recordings of his works.

== Compositional style ==
Adaskin's works encompass orchestra, band and chamber ensembles, solo and duo instruments, voice, and student and occasional pieces. He also wrote the chamber opera, Grant, Warden of the Plains (1967). Stravinsky's neo-classical style and rugged rhythms were a major influence on his compositional methods. His training as a violinist was reflected in his lyrical melodies. Canadian spaces, birdsong, and folklore were other influences. His abiding interest in Canadian art (which he also collected) inspired the orchestral work, In Praise of "Canadian Painting in the Thirties" (1975).

== Selected works ==
- Epitaph for voice and piano (1948)
- March no.1 for orchestra (1950)
- Sonata for Piano (1950)
- Sonatine Baroque for violin solo (1952) or viola solo (1999)
- March no. 2 for orchestra (1953, revised 1962)
- Rondino for Nine Instruments (1961)
- Dedication (1963)
- Daydreams for alto saxophone and piano (1971)
- Woodwind Quintet no.1 (1974)
- Rankin Inlet for piano duet (1978)
- Eskimo Melodies for piano (1980)
- March no.3 for orchestra (1981)
- Vocalise no.1 for solo viola (1990)
- Concerto no.1 for viola and orchestra (1991)
- Three Pieces for piano (1992)
- Concerto no. 2 for viola and orchestra (1995)
- String Quintet (1995)
- Duo for viola and guitar (1996)
- Vocalise no. 2 for solo viola (1996)
- Divertimento No.9 for string trio (1998)
- Duo for viola and piano (1999)
- Finki, Where Are You? for 2 violas (2000)
- Musica Victoria (2000)
