= Peace Tree Day =

Annual festival

Peace Tree Day is an annual festival for children and families of every culture and faith to share and celebrate peace and diversity together. It was founded by Mitra Sen, the producer and director of the award-winning 2005 feature film The Peace Tree.

== History ==
Mitra Sen produced and directed the 2005 film The Peace Tree, which shares the story of two little girls, one Muslim and one Christian, who dream of celebrating each other's festivals, Christmas and Eid. While working on the film, she came up with the concept of a Peace Tree that has the symbols of all our cultures and faiths on one tree to reflect the beauty of "diversity in unity". She felt it important to create an inclusive festival that celebrates all cultures and faiths together, as most religious festivals have their roots in only one religion.

== Proclamation ==
In 2006, Mayor David Miller proclaimed June 1 as Peace Tree Day in the city of Toronto. The cities of Vaughan, Windsor, Markham, Richmond Hill, Whitchurch-Stouffville and York Region, along with the York Region District School Board, York Catholic District School Board and York Regional Police proclaimed Peace Tree Day and organized celebrations for June 1, 2007. Children in schools in Canada, the United States, the Bahamas, England, Ireland, India, Pakistan and Australia are creating Peace Trees that highlight symbols from all our cultures and faiths on one tree.

== Peace Tree Day Celebration 2006 ==
On June 1, 2006, 300 school children and educators from over 40 schools across Southern Ontario, from Niagara to Durham, flocked to Nathan Phillip’s Square in downtown Toronto, celebrated the world's first Peace Tree Day celebration, proclaimed by Mayor David Miller in the City of Toronto. Crafted by their own hands, each child created a symbol of cultural or religious significance, and as an act of fellowship and harmony, placed it upon the Peace Tree. Each participant, given the title of Peace Tree Ambassador, was encouraged to teach their family, friends, and entire communities the value of the Peace Tree project and Peace Tree Day. Peace Tree Day celebrations included workshops presented by children and seniors that shared literature, music, art, dance, and food from around the world.

List of workshops during the Peace Tree Day celebration 2006:

- Storytelling (Sadako and the Thousand Paper Cranes)
- Paper Cranes for Peace
- African Drumming Village
- Bharatnatyam Dance Place
- Tai Chi Centre
- Aboriginal Peace Art
- Yoga Corner
- Peace Tree Day Card Corner
- Sushi Bar
- Tabla Beats
- Peace Tree Place
- Spin the Dreidel
- Mehndi
- Peace Planet
- Chinese Lantern

== Peace Tree Day Celebration 2007 ==
Celebrations were held in parks, schools, hospitals, camps, and organizations across York Region, Windsor, Hamilton, Toronto and Charlottetown, Prince Edward Island this year. Children in schools and film festivals around the world have started creating Peace Trees after viewing the film. In Toronto, students have also started Peace Tree Clubs, Peace Tree Centres and the Peace Tree Ambassadors’ Network has connected children around the world who have started the Peace Tree movement in their schools.

=== Peace Tree Garden ===
In the year 2007, during the celebration of Peace Tree Day, the Police Services and sponsors unveiled the plans for the world’s first Peace Tree Garden. The Peace Tree Garden, located north of Toronto in Bruce's Mill Conservation Area, will incorporate plants from diverse cultures, include a medicine wheel around the Peace Tree and share peace quotes by human rights leaders like Mahatma Gandhi, Martin Luther King Jr., Mother Teresa and many others. The Peace Tree, located in the center of the garden, highlights the symbols of every culture and faith to celebrate the beauty of "diversity in unity."

=== Peace Tree Stand ===
In June 2007, a group of preschool and kindergarten children worked together to create the first Peace Tree Stand and raised $5,000 worth of medical supplies for Free the Children, the charitable organization founded by Craig Kielburger. The Peace Tree Stand, created in celebration of Peace Tree Day, featured drinks and treats from around the world along with workshops reflecting diversity and peace. Drinks included Sharbat Alabalou from Iran, Mugi cha from Japan, Jeera Pani from India, and sweet treats from different parts of Asia. The workshops featured children drawing mehndi peace symbols, making origami paper cranes, drumming workshops and sharing books about peace. The little toddlers tried their hand at creating new rhythms on the tabla and African drums blending beats and creating new rhythms.

== Peace Trees around the world ==
To date, the Peace Tree has begun to grow in India, Canada, USA, Pakistan, Australia, China, South Africa, England, Germany, Ireland, Dubai, and in the Bahamas.

== Peace Tree Ambassadors ==
Peace Tree Ambassadors are young people (mostly children) who are really inspired by the idea of the Peace Tree and Peace Tree Day, who are trying to spread peace around the world.

== See also ==
- The Peace Tree film
