= Bruno Degazio =

Composer, researcher and film sound designer

Bruno Degazio (born March 31, 1958) is a composer, researcher and film sound designer based in Ontario, Canada, where he is also a professor at Sheridan College. Degazio is an expert on computer music.

== Education ==
Degazio received bachelor's and master's degrees in music from the University of Toronto, where he studied music composition with Gustav Ciamaga, as well as Schenkerian analysis, and sound synthesis. He helped establish a contemporary music ensemble, and finished his studies there in 1981.

== Career ==
Degazio is notable for, among other things, implementing computer music algorithms that were devised by the music theorist Joseph Schillinger, and for designing systems to reverse engineer music production from theories about music theory. He has also studied musical aspects of fractal geometry, for automated composition of music. Degazio was one of the first people in the world to apply fractal techniques to algorithmic composition with some degree of depth.

Degazio is proficient with wind controllers, also known as wind synthesizers. His arrangements for this instrument include works by Johann Sebastian Bach and others. Degazio's work on films led to a Genie award nomination for the film Bye Bye Blues, plus prizes from the Baltimore Film Festival and the Toronto Advertising Awards. He also has developed sound tracks for two 3-D IMAX films at the 1990 World's Fair in Osaka, Japan.

== Arrangements of the Goldberg Variations ==
Degazio has arranged a number of pieces from the Goldberg Variations for other instruments. Following are several examples, performed on electronic wind instrument:

Variation 1 (1:55)
Arranged for clarinet and trombone

Variation 7 (0:59)
Arranged for clarinet and bassoon

Variation 8 (2:56)
Arranged for Clarinet and Bassoon

Variation 17 (1:40)
Arranged for two clarinets and cello

Variation 18 (1:13)
Arranged for two clarinets and cello

Variation 19 (1:51)
Arranged for two clarinets and bass

Variation 21 (1:52)
Arranged for whistle, violin, bass, and hand drums

== Writings ==
- "Musical aspects of fractal geometry", Proceedings of the International Computer Music Conference, (San Francisco 1986)
- "The MIDIFORTH computer music system", Proceedings of Printemps Electroacoustique (Montreal 1987)
- "The development of context sensitivity in the MIDIFORTH computer music system", Proceedings of the International Computer Music Conference, (Cologne 1988)
- "Fractal geometry and the Schillinger system", GUIDE Diffusion! (Montreal 1988)
- "Fractal music: aesthetic and practice", Proceedings of the Steirischer Herbst Festival Chaos and Order (Graz 1989)
- Degazio also writes a bi-monthly column, "MIDI buzz", on MIDI applications for computers in Reset Magazine (Ottawa 1987–)

== Further Bach transcriptions ==
Aside from the Goldberg Variations, Degazio has often transcribed other music of J. S. Bach. These employ an electronic wind instrument and/or Yamaha VL1 synthesizer.

From Bach's English Suites
No. 2 in A minor – Bourrée I (1:33)
Arranged for three synthesized wind instruments

No. 2 in A minor – Bourrée I (2:10)
Arranged for synthesized "woodwinds"

No. 4 in F major – Gigue (0:53)
Arranging and physically modelling three synthesized "strings"

From Bach's French Suites
No. 2 in C minor – Air (1:45)
Arranged for three brass instruments

No. 6 in E major – Bourrée (1:28)
Arranged for synthesized "brass"

From Bach's Inventions and Sinfonias
Sinfonia No. 8 in F major(1:11)
Three-Part Invention, arranged for clarinet, violin and cello
