= Mona Bates =

Canadian pianist

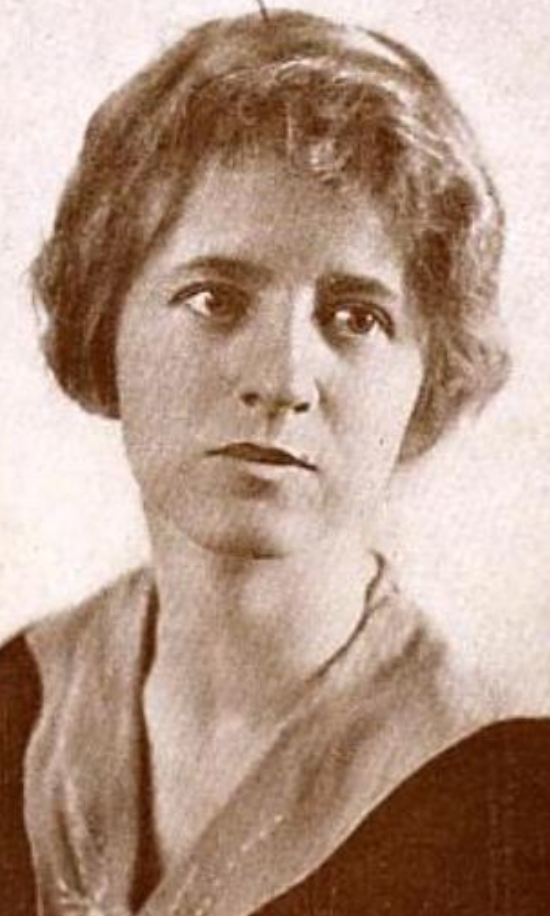
- Mona Bates, from a 1928 publication

Background information
- Born: October 31, 1889; Burlington, Ontario
- Died: March 29, 1971 (aged 81)
- Occupations: Musician, instructor
- Instrument: Piano

Mona Bates (October 31, 1889 – March 29, 1971) was a Canadian concert pianist and music instructor.

== Early life and education ==
Bates was born in Burlington, Ontario to Dr. Frank De Witt Bates and Annabel (nee Grant) Bates. She began playing the piano at fives years of age. She performed in her first public recital two years later. She studied music with J. E. P. Aldous, Edward Fisher, Augustus Stephen Vogt and Viggo Kihl. Bates attended at the Toronto Conservatory of Music as a child and was the youngest student to be named a "First Honour" graduate. She began teaching at the school in 1912.

== Career ==
Bates met Ernest Hutcheson in 1916 while in New York on Chautauqua. She went on to study with him and work as his assistant at the Juilliard School. During the First World War she played at soldier camps in Canada and the United States. Bates debuted in New York City at Aeolian Hall on April 9, 1920, where she was noted by The New York Times as receiving "frequent and hearty applause." She performed as a soloist with the Lewisohn Stadium Orchestra and the New York Symphony Orchestra. She went on to tour internationally performing in London, Budapest, Vienna and Paris. Bates was quoted in the Toronto Daily Star as saying that the experience of playing a musical arrangement in Budapest prepared by Count Apponyi on Franz Liszt's piano "one of the proudest moments of my life". While touring Europe she often performed using the name Anom Setab, a reverse spelling of her name, to appear more exotic.

Bates retired from touring in 1925 to open a music studio in Toronto, where she taught for several decades. The school operated out of an old Massey family mansion on Jarvis Street. Her students included Margaret Miller Brown, George Crum, Marian Grudeff, Clifford Poole, and Naomi Yanova. In 1931, she established the Ten Piano Ensemble, which was affiliated with the Musical Manifesto Group of Toronto. During the war, the two groups held concerts to entertain service men and raise money for the Red Cross. In addition to running the school Bates was a member of the Toronto Symphony Orchestra's women's committee and the Ontario Music Teachers' Association.

== Death ==
Bates died in Toronto on March 29, 1971, from Parkinson's disease, having retired four years prior due to illness. In an obituary about Bates' life the Toronto Daily Star referred to her as "Canada's first internationally famous pianist".
