= Frank Welsman =

Canadian music conductor (1873–1952)

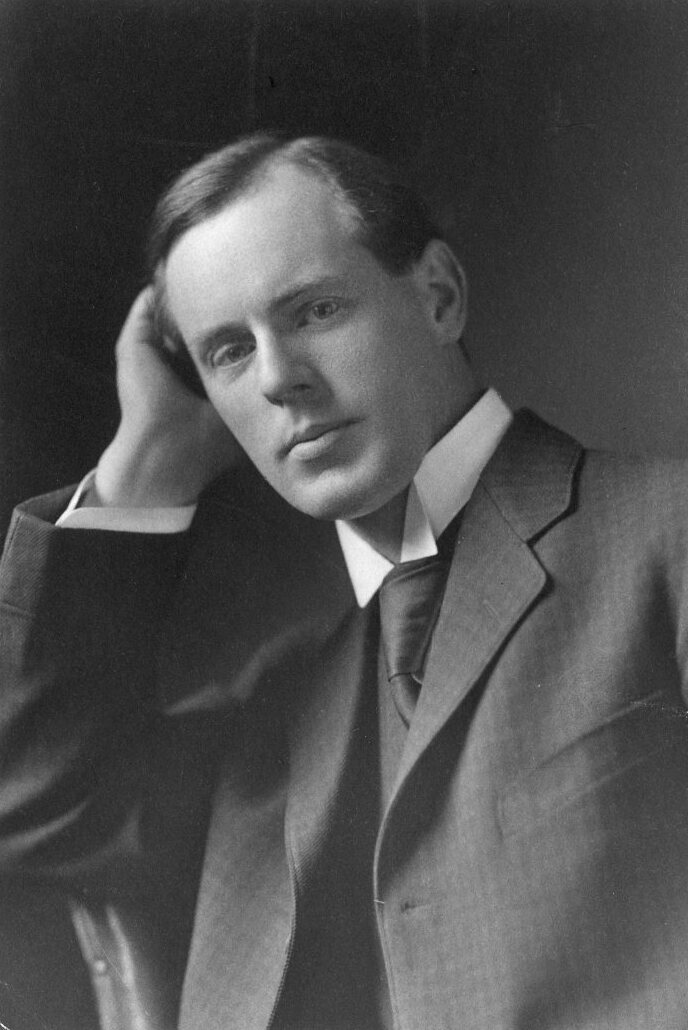
- Welsman, c. 1909.
- Born: December 10, 1873; Toronto, Ontario, Canada
- Died: 2 October 1952 (aged 78); Muskoka, Ontario
- Occupations: Conductor, pianist, composer
- Years active: 1897 –1951

Frank Squire Welsman (20 December 1873 – 2 July 1952) was a Canadian conductor, pianist, composer and music educator. He began his career as a concert pianist, but ultimately earned his place in Canadian history for establishing Toronto's first symphony orchestra of any standing, the Toronto Symphony Orchestra (no relation to the current orchestra of that name) which was active from 1906 to 1918. As a composer he wrote a few songs and some instrumental pieces, mostly works for solo piano. His grandson John Welsman is a notable film score composer and his granddaughter Carol Welsman is a successful jazz pianist and singer.

== Early life and education ==
Born in Toronto, Welsman pursued courses in violin and piano performance at the Toronto College of Music before going to Leipzig in 1894 for further studies. His teachers included Richard Hofmann, Martin Krause, and Gustav Schreck. After completing his education, he returned to Canada in the spring of 1897. Some sources claim he studied the piano privately with Arnold Mendelssohn in Germany

== Career ==
In 1897 Welsman returned to Toronto and commenced a career as a concert pianist, giving annual recitals in Toronto from 1897 until 1905. He also gave recitals in Ottawa, Brantford and Quebec. In 1905, while on an examining trip for the University of Toronto, he gave recitals in Winnipeg, Regina, Calgary, and Victoria. He had joined the piano faculty at the Toronto College of Music where he taught until 1906 when he left to join the faculty of the Toronto Conservatory of Music (TCM). He remained active as a concert pianist through 1907, after which he focused on his career as a conductor and educator. However, he did continue to play the piano in concerts of chamber music, particularly in concerts presented by the Welsman Studio Club, an organization he founded in 1914 which presented bi-weekly piano concerts performed by students and faculty of the TCM for over a decade.

In 1906 Welsman formed the Toronto Conservatory Symphony Orchestra. Two years later the orchestra was reorganized to become a professional orchestra entitled the Toronto Symphony Orchestra, which Welsman conducted up through 1918. In the summers of 1923 and 1924 he worked in Huntsville, Ontario as the conductor for the Anglo-Canadian Leather Company Band.

Welsman left the TCM to join the staff of the Canadian Academy of Music in 1918, but after six years there returned to the staff of the TCM in 1924 where he remained until his retirement in 1951. From 1928 to 1931 he served as music director of Alma College St. Thomas, Ontario. Among his notable pupils were Roy Angus, G.D. Atkinson, Margaret Miller Brown, Percy Faith, H.K. Jordan, and Kate Bryce Marquis Nelson. He died in Muskoka, Ontario in 1952 at the age of 78.

== Sources ==
- Frank Welsman at Encyclopedia of Music in Canada

Frank Welsman, Canadian Conductor, by Mary E. Hughes, Trafford Publishing, 2006 and Kindle Edition (revised) 2020 https://imaginingviolet.blogspot.com

== External references ==
- Archival papers at University of Toronto Music Library
