= Toronto Philharmonic Orchestra =

The Toronto Philharmonic Orchestra (TPO) is a Canadian orchestra based in Toronto, Ontario. The ensemble was formed in 1989 by members of the CJRT Orchestra after that orchestra disbanded. The Toronto Philharmonic Chorus was formed under conductor Giles Bryant in 1990. The orchestra is now disbanded.

A previous orchestra with the name the Toronto Philharmonic Orchestra was active during the 1940s and 1950s. That orchestra was founded as the Promenade Symphony Orchestra in 1934, changing its name to the TPO in 1940. It disbanded in 1956.
