= Toronto Symphony Orchestra (Welsman) =

Canadian orchestra based in Toronto, Ontario

The Toronto Symphony Orchestra (TSO) was a Canadian orchestra based in Toronto, Ontario that was active during the first two decades of the 20th century under the leadership of conductor and pianist Frank Welsman. It was the first professional orchestra that existed for any notable length in the city of Toronto. After 13 seasons of performance, the orchestra folded in 1918 because of problems related to World War I. The current Toronto Symphony Orchestra is unrelated to this one.

== History ==
The TSO was founded in 1906 under the name the Toronto Conservatory Symphony Orchestra by Frank Welsman. The orchestra was originally formed as a student ensemble for the Toronto Conservatory of Music (TCM), and during its first two years the orchestra was made up of only students and faculty from the school. Faculty member and violinist Bertha Drechsler Adamson served as the orchestra's concertmistress.

In 1908, the TSO cut ties with the TCM and became an entirely professional orchestra that was governed by a board under the leadership of Toronto businessman H.C. Cox. The orchestra received financial support from the Massey family. At that time the orchestra was renamed the Toronto Symphony Orchestra. Welsman continued in his roles as conductor and artistic director, and many of the conservatory's faculty members continued to play with the orchestra. Frank Blachford was appointed the new concertmaster, and other professionals were hired at this time to raise the overall playing talent of the orchestra. Composer and cellist Leo Smith joined the orchestra in 1910 after leaving the orchestra of the Royal Opera House in London. He eventually became principal cellist of the ensemble and served as the author of the ensemble's program notes from 1910–1918. Some of the other notable musicians in the orchestra included Jack Arthur, Luigi Romanelli, and Harry Adaskin.

TSO gave its first full season of professional concerts in 1908 at Massey Hall. The orchestra concerts were popular events among Toronto's social elite. The TSO attempted to reach a different audience by establishing extra concerts of popular music in 1909 with ticket prices at just 25 cents.

During its history, the TSO mainly performed works from the standard German Classical and Romantic period repertoires, such as symphonies by Ludwig van Beethoven, Joseph Haydn, Felix Mendelssohn, Wolfgang Amadeus Mozart, and Franz Schubert. In 1911, the ensemble gave a program entirely devoted to the works of Richard Wagner. Strangely absent from the orchestra's repertoire were the works of Johannes Brahms. The group also performed more rarely heard works, such as both of Karl Goldmark's symphonies and Richard Strauss's Death and Transfiguration.

Outside of the German repertoire, the TSO performed such works as Antonín Dvořák's Symphony No. 9, several symphonic works by Vasily Kalinnikov, and the final three symphonies by Pyotr Ilyich Tchaikovsky among others. In April 1911, the ensemble performed Edward Elgar's oratorio The Dream of Gerontius with the composer as guest conductor and the Sheffield Choir. A survey taken of audience members in 1913 revealed that the group's most popularly received works were Tchaikovsky's Symphony No. 6, Mendelssohn's A Midsummer Night's Dream, and Franz Liszt's Hungarian Rhapsody No. 2.

The TSO was host to many important musicians. Sergei Rachmaninoff notably performed his own Piano Concerto No. 2 with the orchestra in 1914. Other notable guests included pianists Wilhelm Backhaus and Vladimir de Pachmann; singers Clara Butt, Johanna Gadski, Alma Gluck, Louise Homer, Leo Slezak, and Ernestine Schumann-Heink; and violinists Mischa Elman, Carl Flesch, Fritz Kreisler, and Eugène Ysaÿe.

During World War I, the TSO began to experience financial difficulties and faced other war-related problems affecting travel, audience attendance, and the ability to keep its players. Ultimately, these problems compounded, and the orchestra disbanded in 1918.
