= Clement Hambourg =

Canadian pianist and jazz promoter (1900–1973)

Clement Hambourg (31 July 1900 – 3 February 1973) was a pianist and musical promoter, a member of the famous Hambourg musical family, who spent his working life in Canada. He began as a classical musician but became more involved in jazz after World War II.

== Early life and career ==
Clement (often known as Clem) was the son of Michael Hambourg. He was born in London and trained there as a pianist by his father. His older brothers were pianist Mark Hambourg (born 1879), the violinist Jan Hambourg (born 1882) and the cellist Boris Hambourg (born 1885). The family settled in Toronto in 1910, and Clement made his pianistic debut there in 1925. He played in Canada with the Hambourg Trio and as a soloist while teaching at the Hambourg Conservatory. In 1928 he married his first wife, the writer Kathleen FitzGerald, and their son Klemi was born that year.

== Post-war jazz ==
In 1946, following his marriage to second wife Ruth Nadine, he founded the House of Hambourg, an after hours bar and music studio for teaching and recording music which attracted progressive jazz musicians, including Guido Basso, Ed Bickert, Ron Collier, Moe Koffman, bassist Jack Lander, drummer Alex Lazaroff, Phil Nimmons, drummer Ron Rully, Norman Symonds and Don Thompson - and also Dave Brubeck on his visits to Canada. Cannonball Adderley, Louis Armstrong and Miles Davis were among those booked to perform there. Operating from five different locations over its lifetime, it eventually closed in 1963, but was an important part of the Toronto jazz scene.

After its closure, Clem continued to perform in Toronto clubs and hotel lounges, mixing classical music with jazz improvisation and salon music. He appeared as the concert pianist in the 1970 Burl Ives film The Man Who Wanted to Live Forever, and in the Canadian television documentary series Here Come the 70s.

== Personal life ==
Clement can be seen in the 1964 short documentary Toronto Jazz, directed by Don Owen. Clement and Ruth were portrayed in the 1988 play Boom, Baby, Boom! by Banuta Rubess with music by Nic Gotham. His son Klemi became a violinist and teacher and the founding conductor of the Peterborough Symphony Orchestra.
