= North of the Border in Canada =

Studio album by Duke Ellington with the Ron Collier Orchestra
- Released: 1969
- Recorded: July 24 and 25, 1967
- Studios: Hallmark (Toronto, Canada)
- Genre: Jazz
- Labels: Decca; DL 75069
- Producer: Louis Applebaum

Duke Ellington chronology
Studio Sessions, 1957, 1965, 1966, 1967, San Francisco, Chicago, New York (1957-67)	North of the Border in Canada (1969)	...And His Mother Called Him Bill (1967)

Collages Cover

North of the Border in Canada (also released as Collages) is an album by the Ron Collier Orchestra performing music by Canadian composers, with the American pianist Duke Ellington as the featured soloist. It was recorded in Toronto in 1967 and released on the Decca label.

== Reception ==
Professional ratings
Review scores
Source	Rating
AllMusic	2/5 stars

The AllMusic review by Scott Yanow stated: "None of the complex suitelike originals are particularly memorable, and the arrangements for the orchestra (two of the pieces utilize a string section) are reasonably colorful, but not too distinctive. Purely for Duke Ellington completists".

== Track listing ==
All compositions by Ron Collier except where noted:

1. "Aurora Borealis" – 10:13
2. "Nameless Hour" (Norman Symonds) – 8:26
3. "Collage #3" (Gordon Delamont) – 2:47
4. "Fair Wind" (Symonds) – 3:35
5. "Silent Night, Lonely Night" – 2:57
6. "Song and Dance" (Delamont) – 9:27

== Personnel ==
- Duke Ellington – piano
- The Ron Collier Orchestra:
  - Dick Van Evera (track 1), Eric Traugott (tracks 1 & 3–6) – trumpet
  - Guido Basso – trumpet, flugelhorn (tracks 1 & 3–6)
  - Fred Stone – flugelhorn (tracks 1 & 3–6)
  - Ray Sikora, Butch Watanabe – trombone (tracks 1 & 3–6)
  - Ron Hughes – bass trombone (tracks 1 & 3–6)
  - Mary Barrow – French horn (track 1)
  - Moe Koffman – alto saxophone, flute (track 1)
  - Bernard Piltch – clarinet, alto saxophone, flute (tracks 1 & 3–6)
  - Eugene Amaro, Rick Wilkins – tenor saxophone (track 1)
  - Gary Morgan – baritone saxophone, bass clarinet (tracks 1 & 3–6)
  - Ed Bickert – guitar (tracks 1 & 3–6)
  - Lenny Boyd, Sam Levine (track 2) – bass
  - Jerry Fuller – drums (tracks 1 & 3–6)
  - Peter Appleyard – percussion, vibraphone (track 1)
  - Andrew Benac, Berul Sugarman, Bill Richards, David Zafer, Harold Sumberg, John Dembeck, Joseph Zera, Samuel Hersenhoren – violin (tracks 1 & 2)
  - Jack Neilson (tracks 1 & 2), Stanley Soloman (tracks 1 & 2), Robert Warburton (track 2) – viola (tracks 1 & 2)
  - George Horvath (track 2), C. G. Ysselstein (tracks 1 & 2), Don Whitton (tracks 1 & 2) – cello
