= Fred Stone (musician) =

- Also known as: Freddie Stone
- Born: 9 September 1935; Toronto, Ontario, Canada
- Died: 10 December 1986 (aged 51) Toronto, Ontario, Canada
- Genres: Jazz
- Instruments: Flugelhorn, trumpet, piano

Fred Stone (sometimes credited as Freddie Stone) (9 September 1935 – 10 December 1986) was a Canadian flugelhornist, trumpeter, pianist, composer, writer, and music educator. He worked as a soloist within both the classical and jazz repertoires from the 1950s through the early 1970s, appearing in concerts with the Duke Ellington Orchestra, the Toronto Symphony Orchestra, the Winnipeg Symphony Orchestra, the Detroit Symphony Orchestra, the Cleveland Orchestra, the Buffalo Philharmonic Orchestra, the Ottawa Symphony Orchestra, and the San Diego Symphony. Between 1971 and 1983, he mainly focused on his work as a composer and teacher, making only periodic public performances, and often with ensembles composed largely of his students. In 1984, he formed "Freddie's Band", a jazz ensemble in residence at The Music Gallery in Toronto. He performed with this group up until his death two years later.

== Early life and education ==
Born in Toronto, Ontario, Stone was the son of saxophonist Archie Stone who was the orchestra leader of Toronto's Casino Theatre from 1936 to 1960. His initial musical studies were with his father. At the age of 14, he began studying the trumpet with Donald Reinhardt in Philadelphia, spending every summer in that city from 1950 to 1955. In his native city he studied music theory and music composition with Gordon Delamont (1955–1960) and John Weinzweig (1960–1962).

== Career ==
Stone began his performance career in 1951 at the age of 16 playing in Benny Louis's big band. From 1955 to 1967 he was a trumpeter in various orchestras related to the Canadian Broadcasting Corporation, including the CBC Symphony Orchestra. During the late 1950s and 1960s he performed widely as a concert soloist with orchestras throughout North America. He also performed actively as a jazz musician, playing regularly with such artists as Ron Collier (1960–73), Phil Nimmons (1965–1970), the Boss Brass (1968–1970), and Lighthouse (1969–1970). In 1970–71 he toured North America and Europe with the Duke Ellington Orchestra.

After returning to Toronto in 1971, Stone became highly involved with his work as a teacher and his performance career virtually ceased for the remainder of the decade; although he remained active as a composer. He was appointed artist-in-residence at Centennial College, where he taught classes from 1972 to 1973. He was also appointed to the music faculty at Humber College in 1972, where he taught through 1975. In 1976 he joined the faculty of George Brown College (GBC), where he taught for just one year. He also taught at the Blue Mountain School of Music, a school affiliated with the GBC. From 1977 until his death in Toronto in 1986, Stone ran his own private studio where he taught improvisational theory and music composition. His only performances in the mid- to late 1970s were periodic ones with small jazz ensembles whose members consisted mainly of his students.

== Discography ==
=== As sideman ===
With Bruce Cockburn

- In the Falling Dark (True North, 1976)
- Mummy Dust (True North, 1981)

With Duke Ellington

- New Orleans Suite (Atlantic, 1971)
- Collages (MPS/BASF, 1973)
- Up in Duke's Workshop (Pablo, 1979)
- The Private Collection Vol. 5 (LMR, 1987)
- New York New York (Storyville, 2008)

With others

- Ron Collier, North of the Border in Canada (Decca, 1969)
- Rob McConnell, Our Second Album (RCA Victor, 1969)
- Catherine McKinnon, Both Sides Now (Arc, 1968)
- Jonnie Bakan, "Duets 1984" (Zsan Records, 2021)

Solo Recording

- In Season Freddie Stone/ composer, flugelhorn, piano, Robert Minden Ensemble. PAF-101(Parasol Arts, 1986) Digital version reissued 2021 Zsan Records
