= Gerald Moore =

English classical pianist (1899–1987)

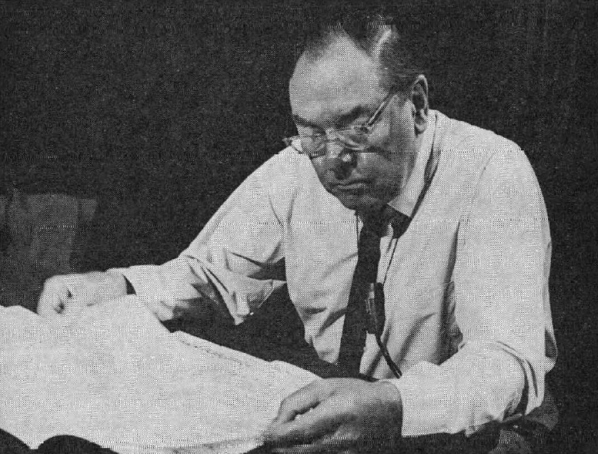
Moore during his visit to Helsinki, Finland in June 1968

Gerald Moore CBE (30 July 1899 – 13 March 1987) was an English classical pianist best known for his career as a collaborative pianist for many distinguished musicians. Among those with whom he was closely associated were Dietrich Fischer-Dieskau, Kathleen Ferrier, Elisabeth Schumann, Hans Hotter, Elisabeth Schwarzkopf, Victoria de los Ángeles and Pablo Casals.

Moore gave lectures on stage, radio and television about musical topics. He also wrote about music, publishing volumes of memoirs and practical guides to interpretation of lieder.

== Life and career ==
=== Early years ===
Moore was born in Watford, Hertfordshire, on 30 July 1899, the eldest of four children of David Frank Moore, owner of a men's outfitting company, and his wife Chestina, née Jones. He was educated at Watford Grammar School, and took piano lessons from a local teacher. Though innately musical, with perfect pitch, Moore was a reluctant piano student: he later said that his mother had to drag him to the piano, "an unwilling, snivelling child – I did not absorb music into my being until my middle twenties."

When Moore was 13 the family emigrated to Toronto, Ontario, Canada, where he studied with the pianist Michael Hambourg, a former pupil of Anton Rubinstein. Moore was distracted from his musical studies by a strong attraction to Anglo-Catholicism; he thought for some time that he had a vocation to become a priest. Hambourg died in 1915, after which his son, the cellist Boris Hambourg, took Moore as his accompanist on a tour of forty engagements in western Canada.

On his return to Toronto, Moore was engaged as organist at St. Thomas's Anglican Church, and later as a cinema organist, providing a musical accompaniment to silent films. This post was reasonably remunerative, but Moore described a cinema organ as an "instrument of torture … shar[ing] pride of place for sheer horror with the saxophone, the harmonica and the concertina." His parents concluded that Toronto was not the place for him to build the career as a pianist that they hoped for. They sent him back to England, to lodge with relatives in London, and pursue his studies with Michael Hambourg's pianist son, Mark.

=== Early career as accompanist ===
While studying with Mark Hambourg, Moore earned money as an accompanist. The director of the Guildhall School of Music, Landon Ronald, heard him play at a recital and advised him to pursue a career as an accompanist. He toured as accompanist for the singer Vladimir Rosing along with pianist Myra Hess in the north of England in late 1922.

In 1921 Moore made his first gramophone recording, accompanying the violinist Renée Chemet for His Master's Voice. They made several more recordings together, but Moore's preference was for accompanying singers rather than instrumentalists. He recorded frequently with Peter Dawson in the early 1920s, and went on a recital tour of Britain with him; it was Dawson who recommended him to the tenor John Coates, who became an important influence on Moore's career.

Moore accompanied virtually every eminent solo singer and instrumentalist in recitals and raised the art of accompanying at the piano from servility to the highest prestige.

— William Mann in
Grove Dictionary of Music and Musicians

Moore credited much of his early success to his five-year partnership with Coates, whom Moore credits with turning him from an indifferent accompanist into one who was sensitive to the music and the soloist, and an equal partner in performance. Another influence, figuring prominently in Moore's memoirs, was the pianist Solomon, whose technique Moore admired and studied.

=== Peak years ===
By the end of the 1930s Moore was so well known as an accompanist that Myra Hess invited him to give a talk about his profession at one of her of lunchtime concerts at the National Gallery. The pianist Joseph Cooper wrote of this, and later similar talks, "He revealed a sense of verbal timing of which any professional comic would be proud. His unique blend of wit and wisdom not only pleased the cognoscenti but also won over ordinary people who had no idea that classical music could be fun." Moore's first book, The Unashamed Accompanist (1943), had its origins in these talks.

Moore is credited with doing much to raise the status of accompanist from a subservient role to that of an equal artistic partner. Dietrich Fischer-Dieskau wrote in his introduction to the German edition of The Unashamed Accompanist, "There is no more of that pale shadow at the keyboard; he is always an equal with his partner". Moore valiantly protected this status of his art, complaining when accompanists he admired were not given billing in concert. He quoted with disapproval the remark made by a singer to Coenraad V. Bos, an accompanist of an earlier generation, "You must have played well today, for I did not notice you." (Note: Bos was not as self-effacing as the comment might suggest. Despite a modest demeanour, it was he rather than the soloist who tended to be in control in performance: "The expert accompanist must have a knowledge of the whole similar to that which is possessed by a conductor, with these two essential differences: he must direct, without seeming to direct, and, in addition, he must play a dual role, one of pianism, and the equally important one of self-effacement." Moore called him "the doyen of accompanists".)

It is debatable, however, whether he succeeded in convincing the British Establishment of his time, of the uplifted status of his art. Whereas prominent conductors and singers, for example, in the British musical theatre tended to be awarded knighthoods, in 1954 Moore was appointed a Commander of the Order of the British Empire (CBE), a lower-ranked award.

=== Later years ===
Moore retired from public performances in 1967, with a farewell concert in which he accompanied three of the singers with whom he was long associated: Dietrich Fischer-Dieskau, Victoria de los Ángeles and Elisabeth Schwarzkopf. This famed concert at London's Royal Festival Hall – recorded by EMI and reissued in 1987 as CDC 749238 – concluded with Moore playing alone: an arrangement for solo piano of Schubert's An die Musik. He made his last studio recording in 1975.

In his memoirs Moore wrote that his services were not needed at Benjamin Britten's Aldeburgh Festival, "as the presiding genius there is the greatest accompanist in the world." In 1967, the chief music critic of The Times, William Mann held that the preeminence was Moore's: "the greatest accompanist of his day, and perhaps of all time." In 2006 Gramophone magazine invited eminent present-day accompanists to name their "professional's professional"; the joint winners were Britten and Moore.

He died at home in the village of Penn, Buckinghamshire, in 1987.

== Books ==
- The Unashamed Accompanist. London: Ascherberg, Hopwood & Crew. 1943. OCLC 222195191.
- Singer and Accompanist – The Performance of Fifty Songs. London: Macmillan. 1953. OCLC 776944495.
- Am I Too Loud? – Memoirs of an Accompanist. London: Macmillan. 1962. OCLC 604108.
- The Schubert Song Cycles: With Thoughts on Performance. London: Hamish Hamilton. 1975. ISBN 0241890829.
- Farewell Recital – Further Memoirs. London: Taplinger. 1978. ISBN 024189817X.
- "Poet's Love" and Other Schumann Songs. London: Hamish Hamilton. 1981. OCLC 475543133.
- Furthermoore – Interludes in an Accompanist's Life. London: Hamish Hamilton. 1983. ISBN 0241109094.
- Collected Memoirs: Am I Too Loud?, Farewell Recital and Furthermoore. London: Penguin. 1986. ISBN 0140074244.

Moore contributed a chapter on "The Accompanist" to A Career in Music (1950, OCLC 3411544) edited by Robert Elkin, with chapters by Harriet Cohen, George Baker and nine others.

== Notes and references ==
Notes

Sources

- Bos, Coenraad Valentyn; Ashley Petis (1949). The Well-Tempered Accompanist]. Bryn Mawr, Pa: T. Presser. OCLC 230396.
- Moore, Gerald (1966) [1962]. Am I Too Loud? – Memoirs of an Accompanist. Harmondsworth: Penguin. OCLC 2160023.
