= Peter Appleyard =

British–Canadian jazz vibraphonist, percussionist, and composer

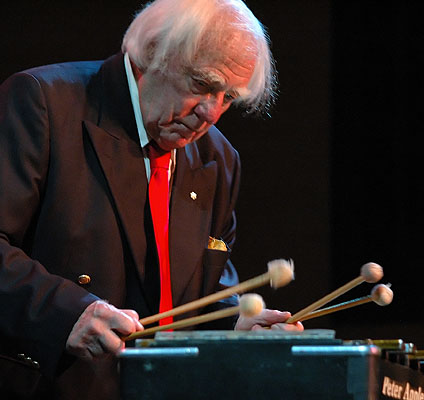
- Peter Appleyard with Dick Hyman at the Toronto Jazz Festival, 2007

Background information
- Born: 26 August 1928; Cleethorpes, Lincolnshire, England
- Died: 17 July 2013 (aged 84) Rockwood, Ontario, Canada
- Genres: Jazz
- Occupation: Musician
- Instrument: Vibraphone

Peter Appleyard, OC (26 August 1928 – 17 July 2013) was a British–Canadian jazz vibraphonist, percussionist, and composer.

He spent most of his life in the city of Toronto, where for many years he was a popular performer in nightclubs and hotels such as The Park Plaza, Stop 33, The 54th, The Chelsea Inn, and The Montreal Bistro. He also played and recorded with many of the city's orchestras and was featured on Canadian television and radio programs. He had his own successful television show on CHCH Channel 11 that was recorded live from Albert's Hall; Peter Appleyard Presents featured many jazz musicians from Blossom Dearie to Lionel Hampton.

In the early 1970s he drew wide acclaim for his performances with Benny Goodman's jazz sextet with which he toured internationally. In 1992, he was made an Officer of the Order of Canada in recognition of his being an "internationally renowned vibraphonist [who] has represented the Canadian jazz community across North America, Europe, the Middle East and Australia".

== Early life and career in England ==
Born in Cleethorpes, Lincolnshire, England, Appleyard became apprenticed to a nautical instrument maker after being forced to leave school owing to economic reasons related to the Second World War. At that time the popularity of the American Big Bands was growing in England, particularly through a major influx in big band recordings from America by jazz musicians such as Benny Goodman, Duke Ellington, and Count Basie. These recordings had a strong influence on Appleyard, and he decided to pursue a career as a jazz musician. He began his career in the early 1940s playing in the Boys Brigade, a youth organization. He performed as a drummer in several other British dance bands during the 1940s and, while a member of the Royal Air Force in the mid-1940s, played in RAF bands.

== Early career in North America ==
In 1949 Appleyard moved to Bermuda, where he lived for several years performing as the resident band leader at the historic Princess Hotel, The Elbow Beach and Belmont Hotel. While there he spent his holidays in Canada and picked up his first set of vibes. He was so impressed with Canada that when the time came to leave Bermuda, he headed for New York and finally Toronto. At first, unable to get a union card in Toronto, Appleyard worked as an elevator doorman at the King Edward Hotel and as a salesman at Simpson's department store. He began studying music with Gordon Delamont and soon thereafter began playing the vibraphone in concerts with Billy O'Connor in the early 1950s. From 1954 to 1956 he played with a band at the Park Plaza Hotel and made numerous appearances on CBC Radio with jazz pianist Calvin Jackson. He formed his own jazz ensemble in 1957 which performed not only in Toronto but also toured throughout North America and appeared on American television during the 1960s. Among the ensemble's original members was pianist and arranger Jimmy Dale. The group accompanied singer Gloria DeHaven for a year.

From 1961 to 1962 Appleyard co-hosted, with singer Patti Lewis, the CBC Radio program Patti and Peter. He spent most of the mid-1960s on the road touring.

In the late 1960s, he ceased his busy touring schedule and returned to Toronto on a more permanent basis. He began playing once more at the Park Plaza Hotel. In 1969 he co-hosted the program Mallets and Brass with Guido Basso for CBC TV. In addition he began studying timpani and percussion and extended his musical expertise substantially.

== Working with Benny Goodman and later career ==
In the early 1970s Appleyard was a member of Benny Goodman's sextet which toured in Europe in 1972 and 1974 and in Australia in 1973. Afterwards, he played only periodically with the group for the remainder of the decade, notably playing three performances with the ensemble at Carnegie Hall in the mid to late 1970s. During these years he lived in Toronto and performed in nightclubs and hotel lounges and was music director for local jazz bands. He was a percussionist in the city's orchestra. In the 1970s he appeared at the Colorado Springs Invitation Jazz Party. From 1977 to 1980 he hosted Peter Appleyard Presents, a jazz and variety television program which was syndicated in North America.

In 1976, Frank Sinatra invited Appleyard to join him in concert with the Count Basie Orchestra and Ella Fitzgerald at the Uris Theatre in New York City. Sinatra made this request based on Appleyard's work with Goodman. Appleyard and Sinatra performed together several years later during a benefit concert in Ottawa arranged by Rich Little.

In 1982 Appleyard formed the All-Star Swing Band which performed traditional pop and jazz tunes, often in medley arrangements by Rick Wilkins. The ensemble's 1982 album Swing Fever received a gold record certification for sales of 50,000 units in Canada and was nominated for a Juno award.

During the late 1990s Appleyard performed at Carnegie Hall under the direction of Skitch Henderson and The New York Pops.

The Japanese government invited him to perform at the Sapporo Jazz Festival.

He received the Queen's Diamond Jubilee Award on 18 June 2012.

He spent his final years living on a farm at Rockwood, Ontario. He died at his farm on 17 July 2013.

== Discography ==
=== As leader ===
- Anything Goes (RCA Camden, 1957)
- The Vibe Sound of Peter Appleyard (Audio Fidelity, 1959)
- Percussive Jazz (Audio Fidelity, 1960)
- The Vibraphone of Peter Appleyard (Canadian Talent Library, 1963)
- Polished Appleyard (Canadian Talent Library, 1969)
- The Lincolnshire Poacher (Audat, 1973)
- Sophisticated Vibes (United Artists, 1976)
- Presents (Salisbury Laboratories, 1977)
- Peter Appleyard (New Ventures, 1979)
- Prelude to a Kiss (RCA Victor, 1982)
- Barbados Heat (Concord Jazz, 1990)
- Barbados Cool (Concord Jazz, 1991)
- Great Vibes with Strings (Rockwood, 2005)
- The Lost Sessions (Linus Entertainment, 2011)
- Sophisticated Ladies (Linus Entertainment, 2012)

=== As guest ===
- Duke Ellington with the Ron Collier Orchestra, North of the Border in Canada (Decca, 1967)
- Skitch Henderson, Swinging with Strings (Arbors, 2001)
- Peanuts Hucko, Peanuts Hucko with the Pied Piper Quintet Featuring Peter Appleyard (World Jazz, 1979)
- Sherrie Maricle, John Mastroianni - Cookin' On All Burners (Stash, 1989)
- Sherrie Maricle, Live Concert (LRC, 1993)
- Bucky Pizzarelli, Four Brothers (Downtown, 2008)
- Lenny Solomon, After You've Gone (BayCities, 1991)
- Slam Stewart, The Cats Are Swinging (Sertoma, 1988)
- Mel Tormé, Sing Sing Sing (Concord Jazz, 1992)
