= London Suite (Coates) =

Musical suite composed by Eric Coates in 1933

The London Suite, also known as London Every Day, is a suite of orchestral music by the English composer Eric Coates. The suite was completed in 1933 when Coates was 47.

It consists of three movements:

1. Covent Garden (Tarentelle)
2. Westminster (Meditation)
3. Knightsbridge (March)

The work was extremely popular when it was first published, no doubt helped by part of the third movement, Knightsbridge, being used as the theme tune for a BBC Radio chat show programme called In Town Tonight which was broadcast initially on the National Programme from 1933 and then switched to the Home Service in 1939 where it continued until 1960. The BBC received such a large number of requests for the name of the piece by post that they had slips of paper printed specifically to help with the demand.

Gerrard Williams arranged the military band edition of the suite for Chappell's Army Journal. Paul V. Yoder also arranged the march for Chappell & Co.

== Orchestration ==
The London Suite is scored for:

Violin I & II
Viola
Cello
Bass
Flute I & II
Clarinet I & II
Oboe I & II
Horns I – IV
Trumpets I & II
Trombones I & II
Harp
Timpani
Percussion: Triangle, Side Drum, Bass Drum, Cymbals (clashed), Cymbal (suspended), Glockenspiel, Tubular Bells and Gong.

== Musical features ==
The first movement quotes the English folksong Cherry Ripe, mimicking the call of street vendors. The second movement quotes the Westminster Quarters.

== London Again ==
Such was the popularity of the London Suite that in 1936 Coates wrote a sequel to it called the London Again Suite; the title pre-empted critics that he was writing about "London again". The movements are as follows:

1. Oxford Street (March). A busy shopping thoroughfare.
2. Langham Place (Elegie). Langham Place is the location of BBC Broadcasting House.
3. Mayfair (Valse). A fashionable and expensive residential area of London.

The second movement references the composer's close association with the BBC, being based on a B♭ B♭ C motif; this movement quotes the "Knightsbridge" March made famous by In Town Tonight and concludes with the chimes of Big Ben which closed down broadcasting for the day. The work received its premiere by the BBC Theatre Orchestra under Stanford Robinson.

== Other "London" works by Coates ==
- London Bridge, March (1934)
- London Calling, March (1943)
- Holborn, March (1950)
