= Donald S. Reinhardt =

US trombonist and brass teacher

Donald S. Reinhardt (1908–1989) was an American trombonist and brass teacher.

He authored several books for brass players, including the Pivot System for Trumpet and Trombone: A Complete Manual With Studies and the Encyclopedia of the Pivot System.

== Life and career ==
Donald Shelley Reinhardt was born in Allentown, Pennsylvania, on January 22, 1908. Reinhardt began his formal musical studies as a violinist but eventually moved to studying the trombone. In spite of some initial success, he struggled and sought help from eighteen different instructors, none of whom were able to help him work through his technical limitations. After an accident damaged his trombone he sent it to be repaired; however it was returned to him with the counterweight still removed. When he went to play the instrument with the counterweight still off, he ended up with a lower horn angle than he had previously played and he noticed that his range had dramatically improved. Some experimentation led him to discover that in order to perform well he needed to play in some ways that were quite different from how most other fine brass musicians played. This led to an interest in studying the physical mechanics of brass technique.

Reinhardt studied music at the Curtis Institute of Music, graduating in 1943 and earned a doctorate from Combs College of Music in 1960.

In the 1930s Reinhardt performed as a trombonist in Philadelphia for the Fox Theater, Philadelphia Grand Opera, and Philadelphia Civic Opera. In 1939 the Fox Theater fired the orchestra. Reinhardt took this opportunity to travel with his wife for the next five months. During this trip, he met in Kansas a young trombone student, whom he gave a brief lesson to, sparking his interest in becoming a teacher. For the next two years, Reinhardt gave free instructions to brass students in order to test and develop his teaching ideas.

In 1954 Reinhardt established a teaching studio in Philadelphia. In 1956 he was appointed Director of Bands at La Salle College High School in Philadelphia, a position he held until 1973.

By the mid-1980s years Reinhardt developed serious health problems. He died of cancer on May 26, 1989.

== Teaching ==
Reinhardt termed his approach to teaching the Pivot System, a term he borrowed from golf. He originally defined a pivot as transferring pressure from one lip to another while changing registers on a brass instrument. He later changed this definition to mean the pushing and pulling of a player's mouthpiece and lips together, as a single unit, up or down along the teeth while changing registers. According to Reinhardt, the three primary playing factors of brass technique were correct breathing, tonguing, and embouchure. Reinhardt felt that each player's unique anatomical features required each player to perform differently and based his teaching on establishing the correct method for each individual student. He noted and categorized eight different tonguing types and four basic embouchure types with five subtypes. Each student would receive a personalized routine that took into account the student's embouchure and tonguing types.

One of his pupils was Fred Stone. Other students included: Dave Sheetz-Lead Trumpet w many show bands and led his own big band in Atlantic City Roger Homefield-Lead Trombonist w Stan Kenton, Buddy Rich & Maynard Ferguson Doug Elliot-Trombonist-Educator Rich Willey-Trumpet, Bass Trumpet-Educator Al Grey-Trombonist w Count Basie for many years Stan Mark-Lead Trumpeter w Maynard Ferguson's Big Band 1973-1982 Terrell Stafford-Jazz Recording Trumpet artist Lynn Nicholson-High-Note Trumpet Artist formerly w Bill Chase, Maynard Ferguson, Buddy Rich, Thad Jones-Mel Lewis Lin Biviano-Former lead Trumpeter w Woody Herman, Count Basie, Buddy Rich Johnny Madrid-Lead Trumpeter formerly w Stan Kenton, Woody Herman, Buddy Rich, Blood, Sweat & Tears, Boz Scaggs Chris LaBarbera-Trumpet artist in South Florida for many years

== Reinhardt Archive ==
In 2026, an online archive (Reinhardt Archive) was created to preserve the original pedagogical material of Reinhardt and of those inspired by him to enable research, study, and exposure to a new generation of brass players. This archive uses advancements in artificial intelligence to enable chat, knowledge graphs, and video and voice cloning of Reinhardt to explain Pivot System concepts.
