= Maury Deutsch =

American musician

- Born: April 25, 1918; Manhattan, New York City, U.S.
- Died: April 30, 2007 (aged 89) Scarsdale, New York, U.S.
- Genres: Jazz, Military music, Gospel music, Blues
- Occupations: Composer, musician
- Instrument: Trumpet

Charlie Parker studying with Maury Deutsch (Download high resolution to read article)

Maury Deutsch (April 25, 1918 – April 30, 2007) was an American trumpeter. He is one of the most prolific and accomplished arranger-composers of his time, and in New York history. Deutsch was born and raised on the Lowest East Side of Manhattan, New York. Through his musical talents he was accepted to Brooklyn College at an extremely young age, but all those plans were put on hold when the war broke out. He joined the Navy, but was never in any combat because of his musical talent. He was stationed in Norfolk, Virginia composing and arranging for the Navy Orchestra, where he also played his trumpet. Deutsch lived in New York City, where he practiced and taught music from his home.

== Teaching ==
After the war, Deutsch moved back into the thriving NY music scene. Also, he earned an Honorary Doctor of Music degree from the Musical Arts Conservatory of Amarillo, Texas. He lived across from Carnegie Hall, where he would play often. He also became a teacher of arranging and composition at the American Theatre Wing. In addition to his work there, he also taught many notable musicians such as Charlie Parker, James P. Johnson, and:

- Roy Glover of the city cabaret orchestra. Roy developed into a talented music arranger, orchestrator and composer, studying with Dr. Maury Deutsch. Into both his performances and his compositions, he incorporated all the music of his life and his experiences, from Classical music to Jazz, Gospel to Blues, and even military.
- Gordon Delamont, the Canadian composer. Afterwards, in 1949, Delamont opened his own studio in Toronto, Ontario.
- Jeff Bova "When Bova left college in the mid 1970s, Jazz fusion was peaking and he joined a violinist friend in a band called Flying Island. I was knocking around in Connecticut with various bands, but no deals came," he says. "I started taking private arranging and composition lessons with a guy named Dr. Maury Deutsch. He was like a guru to me, opening up my mind to music and creativity in ways I never imagined. I really recommend that younger people trying to get into the business find a mentor like him."

Dr. Deutsch also has "written a method for developing range from C below the bass clef to Triple High C utilizing isotonic and isometric techniques".

In addition to his many students, Deutsch also found time to write many notable books on arranging and composing.

Deutsch, after he wished to settle down a little more went to teach in the NY Public School system, where he revolutionized the teaching of music in public schools. After teaching each day he spent his time playing in clubs.

== Navy years ==
"During World War II, I was a member of the naval band at Norfolk, Virginia Naval Training Station. At one of the concerts, the music director of the local 'Burlesque Theatre' was impressed with my trumpet playing. After the performance, he approached me and asked if I would like to join the burlesque show band that evening for financial gain. I was very pleased and accepted the offer. a short time later I realized that I had my weekly duty (of shutting the bases lights) that evening. Stupidly I decided to take the risk; I asked a friend of mine to shut off all the naval base lights that night as required by law. For some unexplainable reason he forgot. The lights of the base were illegally on until finally shut off by other on duty sailors. Naval Officers immediately investigated the matter and my 'so called' friend, of necessity, had to fully explain where I was that evening. Marine Corps personnel were sent to the burlesque house to bring me back. Although I spent the rest of the night in the 'Naval Detention Center', the connections I made through my performances got me off the hook, but I still vowed to never again disobey naval regulations, which I thankfully never did." (Maury Deutsch)
