= Gertrude Price Wollner =

American writer and composer

Gertrude Price Wollner (May 15, 1900 – March 1985) was an American writer and composer. Her teachers included Albert Stossel, E. Robert Schmitz, and Emile Jacques Dalcroze. She married Herbert J. Wollner on April 2, 1926 and they had a daughter named Zelda. She taught music lessons to her grandson, David Ethan Sussman, who would later become an internationally touring opera conductor. She published several articles about music education and one book, Improvisation in Music: Ways Toward Capturing Musical Ideas and Developing Them (1963). Wollner taught at Boston University, New England Conservatory of Music, and New York University. She believed that "For any age, a childlike attitude and tenacity of search are essential, and rewarding. Not all “creative” music-making needs to be great music that lasts forever. Through the doing, something genuine occurs which enhances all future music experience for the individual."

Wollner was an honorary member of Sigma Alpha Iota, the international music fraternity for women.

== Selected works ==
Her compositions include:

=== Chamber ===
- Allegro (oboe and bassoon; 1950)
- Cello Sonata (1946)
- Quartet (English horn, violin, viola, and cello)
- Trio (clarinet, violin, cello; 1950)

=== Orchestra ===
- Exaggerated Impressions (string orchestra and percussion)
- Suite (string orchestra)

=== Piano ===
- A Dance to My Daughter
- Impressions of Tour of Old Marblehead

=== Theatre ===
- After Paul Draper (1944)
- Caesar and Cleopatra
- Music-Narration-Pantomime-Dance
- Reed Drum (1940)
- Scarlet Letter

=== Vocal ===
- "Poem" (text by Rabindranath Tagore; 1937)
- "These August Nights" (text by Melville Henry Cane; 1935)
- We Catch a Fish (voice and orchestra)
