= E. Robert Schmitz =

Franco-American pianist, teacher, writer, editor, and organizer (1889–1949)

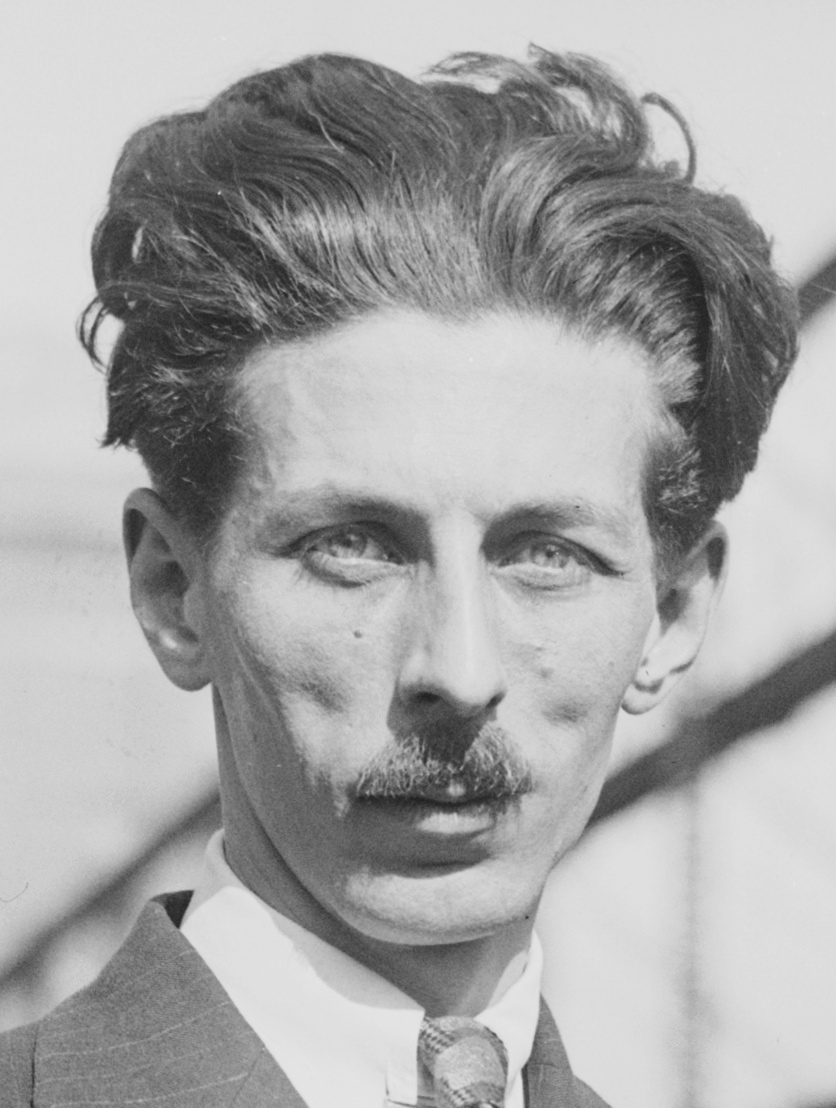

E. Robert (Elie Robert) Schmitz (February 8, 1889, in Paris – September 5, 1949, in San Francisco) was a Franco-American pianist, teacher, writer, editor, and organizer.

He studied with Louis Diémer at the Conservatoire de Paris, where he won first prize in piano. A protégé of Debussy, Schmitz caught the attention of Camille Saint-Saëns and Vincent D'Indy while directing the Association musicale moderne et artistique (later renamed L'Association de concerts Schmitz) which premiered Debussy's Première rhapsodie, Roussel's Evocations, Le Flem's Crépuscules d'amour, and Milhaud's Suite symphonique. Schmitz lead the Association from 1911–14.

Schmitz toured the United States in 1919 and, the following year, founded the Franco-American Music Society in New York, which incorporated as Pro Musica from 1923–36. During this period, the first American appearances of Bartók and Ravel were sponsored, as well as lectures and concerts by Schoenberg, Prokofiev, and Stravinsky. Schmitz also had a personal and professional friendship with Charles Ives.

Schmitz published his system of piano study, The Capture of Inspiration, in 1935, as well as editions of the Chopin Etudes, the Bach Two-Part Inventions, and other works that included explanatory texts on his method. His book, The Piano Works of Claude Debussy, a technical analysis with commentary, was published posthumously in 1950. Among his pupils were composers Samuel Dolin, Harry Somers, and Gertrude Price Wollner; and pianist Naomi Yanova.

He recorded in 1942 the Debussy Preludes, Books I and II, for RCA Victor Records, as well as other works for Edison Records. The CD, Élie Robert Schmitz joue Debussy (Les introuvables, Vol. 34), was released in 2023.

Listen to his performance of the Prelude and Fugue in A Minor by Bach-Liszt, Ampico Recording # 65043, played on a 1926 Mason & Hamlin Ampico A, RBB 6' 11.5" Reproducing Piano

Schmitz died at age 60.
