= Michael Hambourg =

Russian-born Canadian pianist (1855–1916)

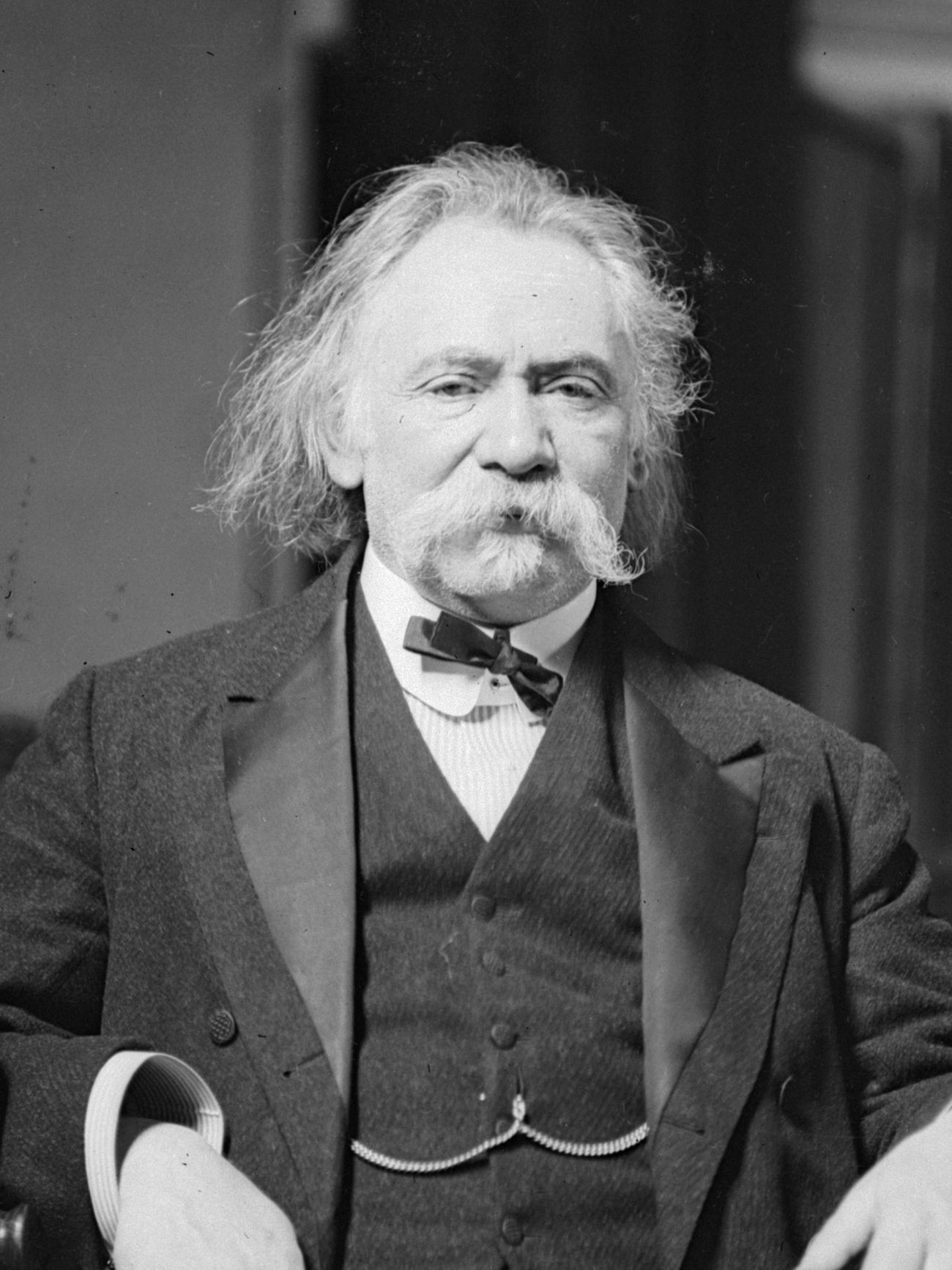

Background information
- Born: 12 July 1855; Yaroslav, Russia
- Died: June 18, 1916 (aged 60) Toronto, Canada
- Occupation: Pianist
- Instrument: Piano
- Member of: Hambourg Conservatory of Music

Michael Hambourg (12 July 1855 – 18 June 1916) was a Russian-born Canadian pianist and music educator. He was the teacher of several prominent pianists; including his sons, Clement and Mark Hambourg. He worked as a piano pedagogue at conservatories in Russia, the United Kingdom, and Canada during his lifetime. In 1911, he co-founded the Hambourg Conservatory of Music in Toronto with his sons, the cellist Boris Hambourg and the violinist Jan Hambourg. He served as the director of that institution until his death in 1916.

== Life and career ==
Born in Yaroslav, Russia, Michael Hambourg was trained as a pianist by Nikolai Rubinstein at the Saint Petersburg Conservatory from which he graduated in 1879. He then taught piano in Voronezh until joining the faculty of the Moscow Philharmonic Conservatory (now the Russian Institute of Theatre Arts) in 1888. During this time he was the teacher of his son, the pianist Mark Hambourg, and in 1890 the Hambourg family traveled to London for Mark's debut as a concert pianist at age 11. The Hambourg family decided to remain in London, and Michael Hambourg joined the piano faculties of the Royal Academy of Music and the Guildhall School of Music and Drama.

In 1910, Hamburg immigrated to Canada and became a naturalized Canadian. In partnership with his sons, the cellist Boris Hambourg and the violinist Jan Hambourg, he co-founded the Hambourg Conservatory of Music in Toronto in 1911. He served as the director of that school until his death five years later.

Michael Hambourg died on 18 June 1916 in Toronto. Some of his well known pupils included the pianists Gerald Moore and Poldowski.
