= Hambourg Conservatory of Music =

Private music conservatory in Toronto, Canada

Coordinates: 43.6673°N 79.3744°W

The Hambourg Conservatory of Music was a private music conservatory in Toronto, Canada, that was operated by the Hambourg family of musicians from 1911 through 1951. Established by pianist Michael Hambourg and his sons, the cellist Boris Hambourg and the violinist Jan Hambourg, the school was originally located on the Gooderham property at the northeast corner of Sherbourne and Wellesley Streets. In 1913 the school relocated to 194 Wellesley St E at the corner of Sherbourne St. At that point in time the building's attic was transformed into a recital hall.

Michael Hambourg served as the school's first director until his death in 1916 when his sons succeeded him as co-directors in that role. Boris Hambourg became sole director of the conservatory in 1920 when Jan moved to Europe to pursue a career as a concert violinist. Boris's wife, the New Zealand born pianist Maria Bauchope, served as the business manager of the school. They continued in these roles until 1951 when the school closed just three years before his death.

The Hambourg Conservatory of Music employed an international staff and their faculty consisted of several well known musicians. This attracted a global student population and several prominent musicians were trained at the school.

== Alumni ==
- Howard Mawson
- Naomi Yanova

== Faculty ==
- Boris Berlin
- Rachel Cavalho
- Gerald Moore
