= Albert Stoessel =

American classical composer

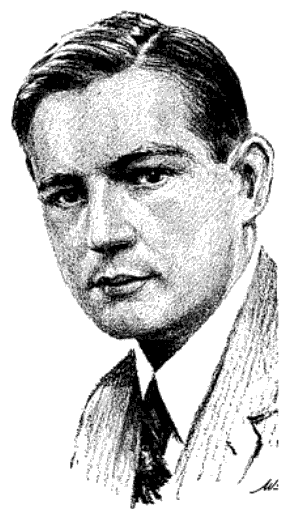
- In Musical Advance, June 1926
- Born: Albert Frederic Stoessel; October 11, 1894; St. Louis, Missouri
- Died: May 12, 1943 (aged 48); New York, New York
- Occupations: Composer, violinist, conductor
- Spouse: Julia Pickard (m. 1917)
- Children: 2

Albert Frederic Stoessel (October 11, 1894 – May 12, 1943) was an American composer, violinist and conductor.

== Biography ==
He was born in St. Louis, Missouri in 1894. He studied music at the Berlin Hochschule as a pupil of Emanuel Wirth and Willy Hess. At 19 he began his professional playing career with the Hess String Quartet, and toured as a violin soloist in Switzerland, the Netherlands, and Germany. He returned to the United States in 1915 for a concert tour, appeared with the Saint Louis Symphony Orchestra and the Boston Symphony Orchestra, and lived in Boston until 1917 while pursuing his career as a violinist and composer.

Stoessel enlisted in the United States Army in 1917, becoming a lieutenant in the 301st Infantry American Expeditionary Forces and leader of the regimental band at Camp Devens. Stoessel went to France in 1918 with the 76th Division as bandmaster of the 301st. He became director of the AEF Bandmaster's School of Chaumont, France, organized by Walter Damrosch, after studying there with André Caplet.

After his discharge in 1919, Stoessel performed as a soloist with the Boston Symphony Orchestra and toured with Enrico Caruso's last tour. In 1921 he became the assistant conductor of the Oratorio Society of New York under Walter Damrosch. For seven years, beginning in 1923, he was the head of the New York University Music Department, from which he was awarded a master's degree in 1924. He left to become director of the departments of opera and orchestra at the Juilliard Graduate School of Music in 1931. He became conductor of the Worcester Music Festival of the Worcester (Massachusetts) County Musical Association in 1925, and conducted the Westchester Festival in White Plains, New York, from 1927 to 1933. Stoessel first began work with the Chautauqua Institution in 1921 as a conductor, and in 1929 he was appointed musical director.

Albert Stoessel composed the opera Garrick in 1936, wrote a treatise in 1919 entitled The Technique of the Baton, and composed a number of violin, piano, choral, and orchestra pieces. The Violin Sonata in G major (1921) has been recorded twice. His wife, Julia Pickard Stoessel, had also been a violin student in Berlin. They were married June 27, 1917, and had two sons, Edward and Fredric.

He conducted the United States premiere of the Piano Concerto in D flat by Aram Khachaturian, on 14 March 1942, with soloist Maro Ajemian and the Juilliard Graduate School.

It was while on stage conducting an orchestra for American Academy of Arts and Letters in New York, that Stoessel died of a heart attack on May 12, 1943.

His notable students included Bernard Herrmann, Robert Talbot and Gertrude Price Wollner.

== Works ==
=== Opera ===
- Garrick, lyric opera in 3 acts (1936)

=== Orchestral ===
- Suite Antique, version for orchestra (1925)
- Hispania, suite for orchestra (1928)
- Song of the Volga Boatman: A Choral-Symphonic Paraphrase of an Old Russian Folk Song, for orchestra and optional chorus (1928)
- Cyrano de Bergerac: A Symphonic Portrait, for orchestra (1931)
- Concerto Grosso, for strings and piano (1935)
- Early Americana, suite for orchestra (1936)
- Suite of Orchestral Excerpts from Garrick, suite for orchestra (1938)

=== Chamber ===
- Suite Antique, for 2 violins and piano (1917)
- Andantino Grazioso, for violin, cello and piano (1933)
- Serenade Rococo, for violin, cello and piano (1933)

=== Solo instrumental ===
- The American Lady March: Two-Step, for piano (1909)
- St. Louis Centennial March: Two-Step, for piano (1909)
- Crinoline: Minuet in Old Style, for violin and piano (1916)
- Two Compositions, Op. 8, for violin and piano (1916)
- Southern Idyl, for violin and piano (1916)
- Two American Dances, for violin and piano (1917)
- Five Miniatures, for violin and piano (1917)
- Boston's Own: March, for piano (1918)
- Sonata in G, for violin and piano (1921)
- Dutch Patrol: Fantasy on Two Netherland Airs, for piano (1922)
- Hispania, Suite for piano (1922)
- Five Pieces, for violin and piano (1925)

=== Vocal ===
- Moonlight, for voice and piano (1916)
- Glimpses, for voice and piano (1922)
- Rose Prayer, for voice and piano (1922)

=== Choral ===
- Beat! Beat! Drums, for chorus (1922)
- Three Traditional Spirituals, for male chorus and string and harp or piano (1931)
- Hymn to Diana, for S.S.A. chorus (1933)
- It was a Lover and His Lass, for S.S.A. chorus (1933)

=== Instructional ===
- Essentials of Violin Mastery: Advanced Studies for the Preservation of Violin Technique (1917)
- The Technique of the Baton (1919)
