= Sherrie Maricle =

American drummer (born 1963)

- Born: Sharon Lee Maricle; September 2, 1963 (age 62); Buffalo, New York, U.S.
- Genres: Jazz
- Occupations: Musician; bandleader
- Instrument: Drums
- Years active: 1980s–present
- Labels: Arbors, Lightyear Entertainment
- Website: Diva Jazz

Sharon Lee "Sherrie" Maricle (born September 2, 1963, Buffalo, New York) is an American jazz drummer.

Maricle's musical education began in the fourth grade when she started with the clarinet after being told that the trumpet was "off limits" to girls. She moved on to the cello and settled on the drums in the sixth grade after seeing Buddy Rich play. Maricle began playing professionally, performing locally with Slam Stewart, while studying music (B.A. 1985) at SUNY-Binghamton. She then moved to New York City and attended New York University where she completed a Master's of Arts in Jazz Performance in 1986 and a Doctorate of Philosophy in Jazz Performance/Composition in 2000. In the late 1980s, she was appointed director of percussion studies at NYU.

Maricle directed Saturday jam sessions at the Village Gate from 1987 until the venue closed in 1993. Beginning in 1987, she also began collaborating and leading small groups with Peter Appleyard. In the 1990s, she performed with The New York Pops, Clark Terry, and Al Grey and began working with the group DIVA.

Maricle currently leads the DIVA Jazz Orchestra, the DIVA Jazz Trio, and the quintet Five Play. She teaches as a member of the jazz faculty at the New York State Summer Music Festival, as well as running her own private drum and percussion studio. In 2009, she received the Lifetime Achievement Award at the Mary Lou Williams Women in Jazz Festival.

== Discography ==
- Sherrie Maricle with Peter Appleyard, Bill Mays & Lynn Seaton – Live Concert (LRC Ltd., 1993)
- Sherrie Maricle and Diva: I Believe In You (Arbors Records, 2000)
- Sherrie Maricle and the DIVA Jazz Orchestra – Live in Concert (2002)
- Sherrie Maricle & the DIVA Jazz Orchestra: Present TNT – A Tommy Newson Tribute (Arbors, 2005)
