= Naomi Yanova =

Canadian pianist (1908–1996)

Naomi Yanova Adaskin, better known publicly by her stage name Naomi Yanova and also known by her maiden name Naomi Granatstein and her married names Naomi Adaskin and Naomi Godden, (May 6, 1908 – March 1, 1996) was a Canadian pianist, music educator, music editor, writer on music, and music critic.

== Life and career ==
Born Naomi Granatstein in Toronto, Yanova began her professional training as a pianist at the Hambourg Conservatory of Music in her native city. After completing her studies at that school, she pursued further education; first at the Toronto College of Music (now The Royal Conservatory of Music) where she was a pupil of Healey Willan, and later the University of Toronto. She also studied under Mona Bates from 1928 through 1938 and with E. Robert Schmitz from 1941 through 1944.

Yanova made her debut as a concert pianist at the age of 12 at Massey Hall. She performed under the name Naomi Yanova; taking the name Yanova from the feminine form of her mother's name. On December 28, 1934, she married the cellist John Adaskin who was the younger brother of Murray Adaskin. She was a frequent partner of her husband in concerts both before and after their marriage in the years 1929 through 1938. She simultaneously worked as part of a piano duo with Etta Coles known as Yanova and Coles. In 1939 she ceased performing with Coles, but continued to be active as a concert pianist with symphony orchestras such as the New York Philharmonic, the Montreal Symphony Orchestra, Buffalo Philharmonic Orchestra, and the Rochester Philharmonic Orchestra. In 1943 she recorded George Gershwin's Rhapsody in Blue for radio broadcast with the Toronto Philharmonic Orchestra being led by conductor Andre Kostelanetz.

In 1939 Yanova joined the piano faculty of the Toronto College of Music; teaching there through 1944. She then worked as a music critic for the Toronto Daily Star and also contributed articles on music to Star Weekly, Chatelaine, and The Globe and Mail. She also worked as an editor for the publisher Ginn & Company; editing music texts written for schools from 1965 through 1969. She later worked in the same capacity for McGraw Hill during the 1970s.

A portrait of Yanova painted by Paraskeva Clark is in the collection of the National Gallery of Canada.

== Personal life ==
Adaskin's marriage to John Adaskin ended upon his death in 1964. They had two daughters, Tamar (b. 1944) and Susan (b. 1946). She later married the pianist Reginald Godden in 1979.

Naomi Yanova Adaskin died on March 1, 1996, in Toronto.
