= Mark Hambourg =

Russian and British pianist (1879–1960)

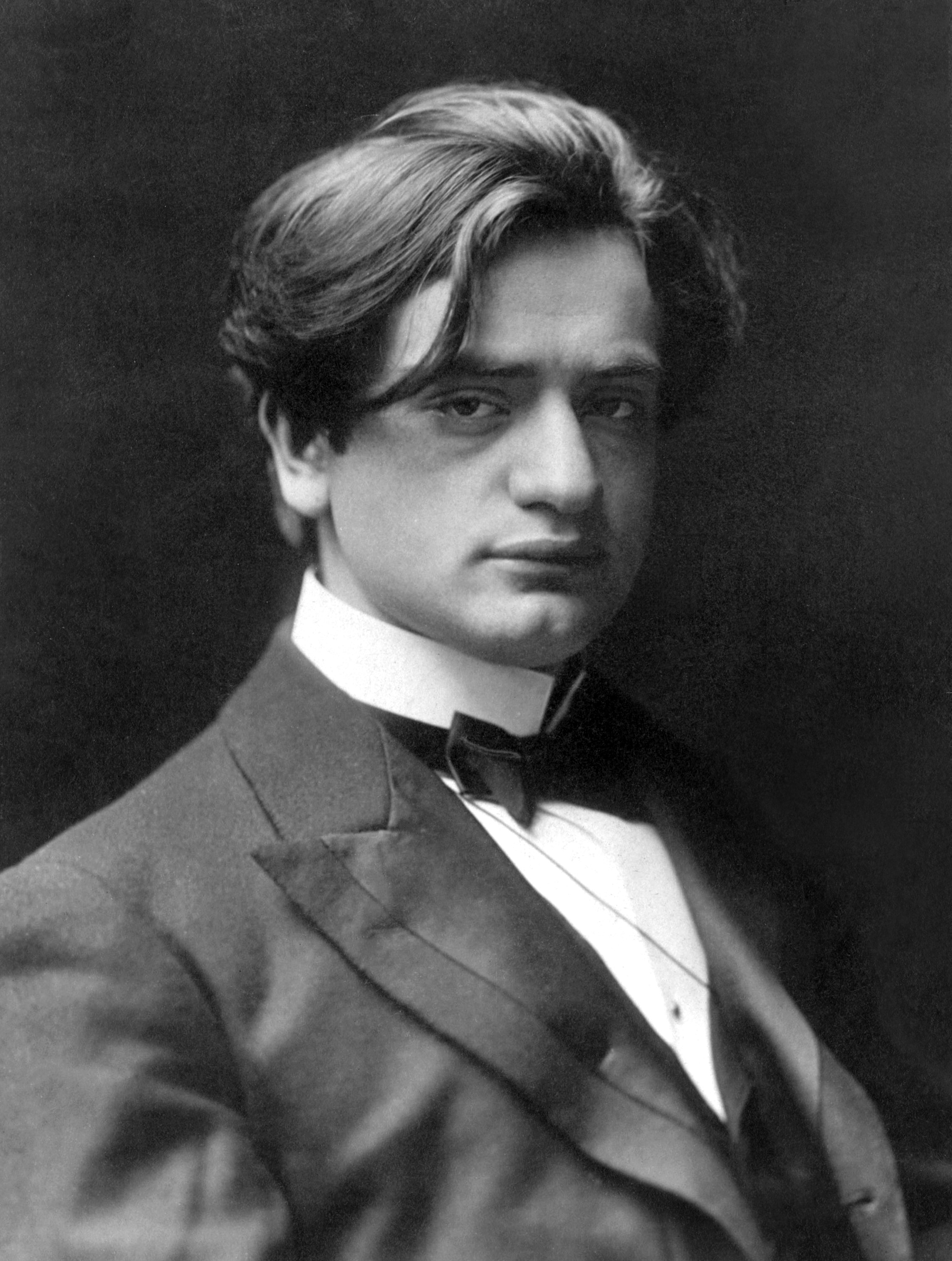
Hambourg at the time of his first American tour, 1899–1900

Mark Hambourg (Russian: Марк Михайлович Гамбург; 1 June 1879, in Boguchar, Voronezh Governorate – 26 August 1960, in Cambridge, United Kingdom) was a Russian and British concert pianist.

== Life ==
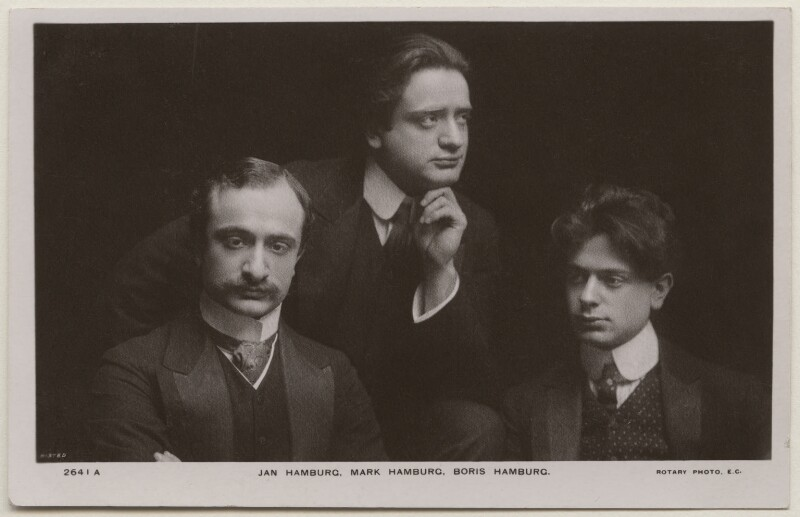
Mark Hambourg (centre) with his brothers Boris (right) and Jan (left)

Mark Hambourg was the eldest son of the pianist Michael Hambourg (1855–1916), a pupil of Anton Rubinstein). His brothers included the cellist Boris Hambourg, the violinist Jan Hambourg (with whom he played in chamber ensemble as the Hambourg Trio), and the pianist and musical organiser Clement Hambourg (1900–1973). His father was principal of the Voronezh Conservatory, and later a professor at the Moscow Conservatory, so that Mark continued his studies with his father even when he attended that academy. His uncle Alexander Hambourg was also a conductor and his cousin Charles Hambourg (1895–1979) was a cellist and conductor.

== London, 1889 ==
The family moved to London in 1889, as refugees from the Tsarist regime. There, having been heard by Paderewski, Mark made a debut at the old Princes Hall on 12 July 1890. This was a success, and there was another concert there, and a tour of the provinces. The family was too poor to turn down these opportunities, though they would gladly have protected the boy from public life. As a child he was billed as Max Hambourg. He was invited into the circle of the painter Felix Moscheles (son of the pianist Ignaz Moscheles), in London, where he often met Oscar Wilde, Bernard Shaw, Ellen Terry and others. It was in this period that he became tired of elderly ladies wanting to kiss him, and permitted them to do so only in exchange for a large box of chocolates. In 1890 Shaw, hearing him play, felt that the Lyric Theatre was merely exploiting children, but late in 1891 he admired Hambourg's performance of Bach at Steinway Hall and wrote that, with suitable training, "this Russian lad might astonish the world some day".

== Vienna, 1891–1895 ==
Sponsored largely by Paderewski, Hambourg was sent to study under Theodor Leschetitzky in Vienna for three years, arriving there in autumn 1891. There he won the Liszt Scholarship of 500 marks, and made a large number of friends among the artistic circles of Vienna. He made his first appearance as an adult pianist in early 1895, playing Chopin's Concerto No. 1 in E minor under the baton of Hans Richter, with the Vienna Philharmonic Orchestra. Then, while still a student with Leschetizky, he stood in at short notice (on his master's recommendation) to play Liszt's Hungarian Fantasia under Felix Weingartner, in place of Sophie Menter, who was indisposed. The audience, at first disappointed, was completely won over, and at the banquet which followed, Brahms himself proposed the toast to the young pianist.

== England, and touring ==
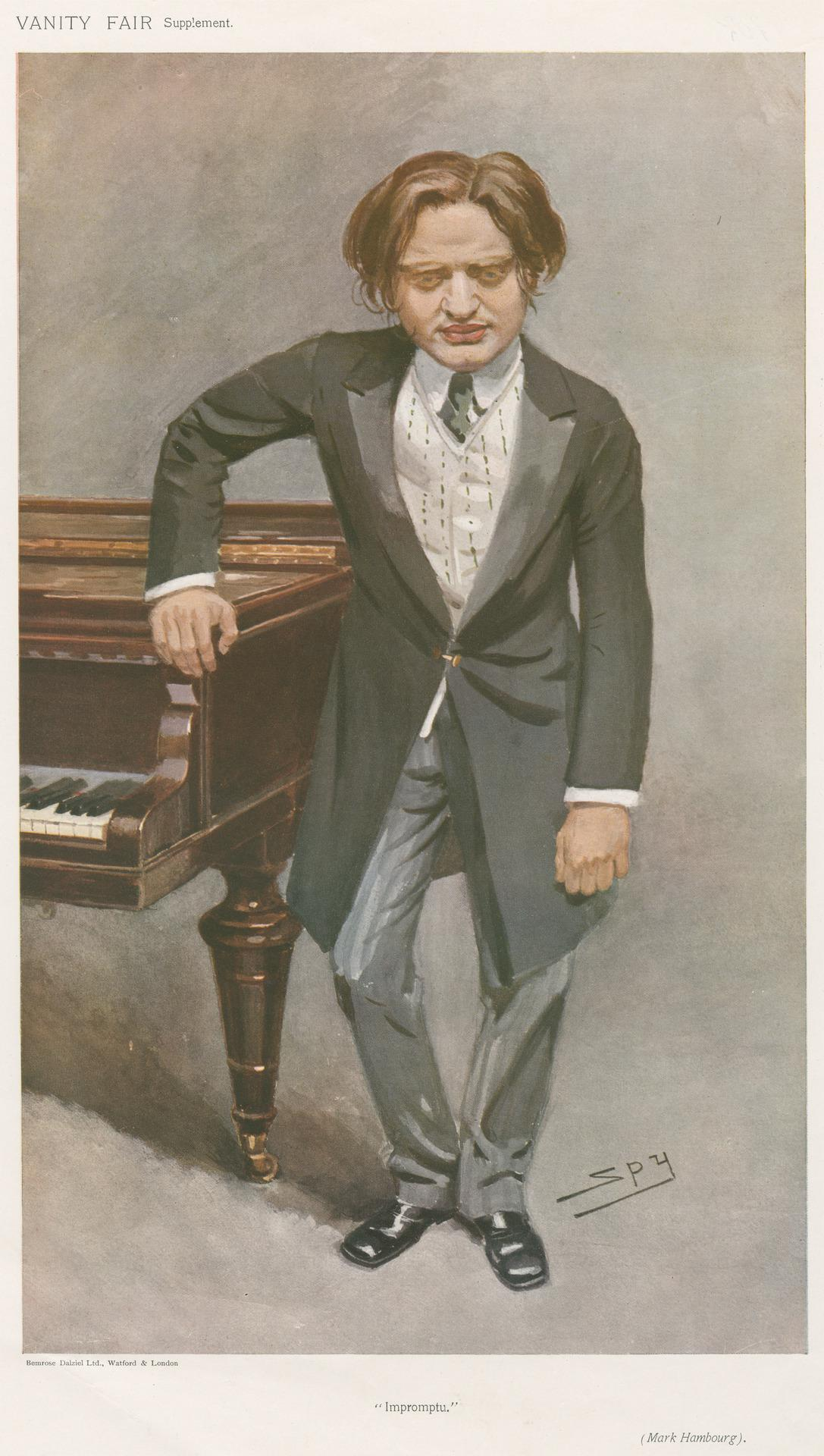
Hambourg caricatured by Spy for Vanity Fair, 1908

In London in 1895, Henry Wood conducted a concert at St James's Hall in which Hambourg played three piano concerti. According to Wood, his appearance and technique were compared to that of Anton Rubinstein, and Ferruccio Busoni later told Wood that Hambourg's was then the greatest talent of the time.

In 1895, Hambourg began his first world tour (aged 16), beginning in Australia, where in (Sydney) he was asked to prolong his stay by six weeks. Returning to London, he deputized for Paderewski at a Philharmonic Society concert playing Anton Rubinstein's Piano Concerto No. 4 in D minor. He first appeared in Paris in 1896, and after that in Brussels and Berlin. He went to the United States in the autumn of 1899, making his American debut in Boston on November 3 with the Boston Symphony Orchestra under William Gericke, and his New York debut a few days later with the same orchestra. The tour that followed included stops in Philadelphia, Baltimore, Chicago, and Pittsburgh. He then returned to London, and in 1901 made his first appearances at the Queen's Hall Proms under Henry Wood. Over the next four years he made another American tour and made visits to Poland, Russia and Germany. (He had met Lenin through Felix Moscheles in London in 1900). In 1906 he made a month-long concert visit to South Africa, taking his own piano by precarious means across the Veldt to a remote location. He first toured in Canada in 1909 and later became friends with the Canadian pianist Harold Bradley.

== Wartime ==
At the outbreak of World War I parts of the press circulated the scurrilous rumour that Hambourg was German, obliging him to prove his Russian origin and to show that he had been naturalized British for over twenty years. He won damages from the Daily Mail in court. Soon afterwards he made another visit to America, and narrowly escaped making the return journey on the fateful last voyage of the RMS Lusitania. On his return to London he gave recitals at the Aeolian Hall, of early English music from the Fitzwilliam Virginal Book, learning it by memory from the manuscript itself as the German Breitkopf edition was unavailable. He gave many concerts of classics during the war at the London Coliseum.

== Later career ==
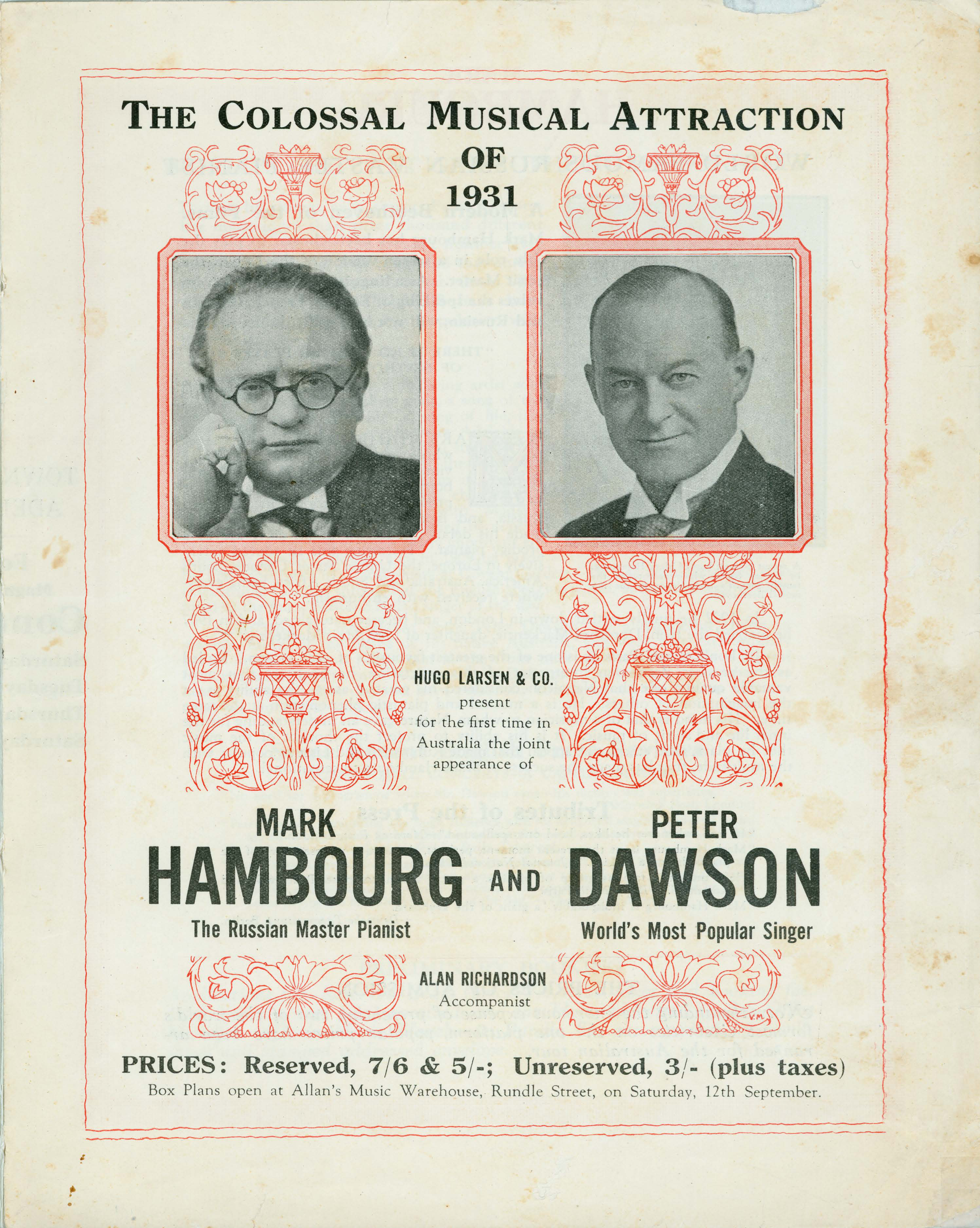
Cover of the programme for Hambourg's 1931 concert in Adelaide with singer Peter Dawson

Hambourg's career survived World War I and he remained a very famous performer throughout the 1920s and 1930s. After the war, he again took up his programme of world touring, visiting France, South Africa and Canada, and making regular provincial tours in Britain, and he made a further world tour before 1924. He lived in London for most of his adult life, mostly at 27 Cumberland Terrace, Regent's Park in a house full of antiques. Like his friend Benno Moiseiwitsch he was a member of the Savage Club.

Mark Hambourg recorded for His Master's Voice and made his first records in 1909. He can be seen in action as the down-and-out pianist nicknamed "Chopin" in John Baxter's 1941 movie The Common Touch. He was also an occasional composer of works for solo piano including the Variations on a theme of Paganini (1902), and he also made arrangements of works for piano solo and two pianos.

In 1907, Hambourg married the violinist Dorothea Muir Mackenzie (1881–1971), known as "Dolly", who had studied with Eugène Ysaÿe. They had four daughters: pianist Michal Augusta Hambourg (1919–2004), with whom her father sometimes performed piano duos; the literary editor Sonia Hambourg-Bassarab; Nadine Hambourg Marshall, a teacher who married sociologist Thomas Humphrey Marshall; and Daria Hambourg (1920–1993), wartime correspondent of Eric Koch.

Mark Hambourg died in Cambridge in England in 1960.

== Writings ==
- How to Become a Pianist (C. Arthur Pearson, London 1922); and as How to Play the Piano (George H. Doran, New York 1922).
- From Piano to Forte (Cassell, London 1931).
- The Eighth Octave (Williams & Norgate, London 1951).

== Sources ==
- Arthur Eaglefield Hull, A Dictionary of Modern Music and Musicians (Dent, London 1924).
- Donald Brook, Masters of the Keyboard (Rockliff, London 1947 (2nd edn.)).
- Eric Koch, The Brothers Hambourg (Robin Brass Studio, 1997)
- George Bernard Shaw, Music in London 1890-1894 (Constable, London 1932).
- Henry J. Wood, My Life of Music (Gollancz, London 1938).
