= Norman Symonds =

Canadian musician

Norman Alec Symonds (23 December 1920 – 21 August 1998) was a Canadian composer, clarinetist, and saxophonist who lived and worked in Toronto, Ontario. A leading figure in the third-stream movement in Canada, he composed several jazz works which employed classical forms.

== Early life and education ==
Symonds was born in Nelson, British Columbia. He grew up in Victoria, British Columbia, where he began playing the clarinet as a teenager. He served in the Royal Canadian Navy during World War II from 1938 to 1945. While stationed in Halifax he played with a dixieland band under the direction of saxophonist Charles "Bucky" Adams.

In 1945 Symonds entered The Royal Conservatory of Music where he studied clarinet, piano, theory, and harmony through 1948. He then studied privately for several years with Gordon Delamont in Toronto.

== Career ==
From 1949 to 1966, Symonds worked actively as a clarinetist, alto and baritone saxophonist and arranger with several dance bands in Toronto, including those led by Leo Romanelli, Bobby Gimby, and Benny Louis. From 1953 to 1957 he played with and directed his own jazz octet whose members also included Ed Bickert, Ron Collier, Ross Culley, Bernie Piltch, Jack Richardson, and Jerry Toth. The ensemble performed at the Stratford Festival in 1956.

Symonds' Concerto Grosso for Jazz Quintet was performed in 1963 by the Winnipeg Symphony Orchestra and the Ron Collier Jazz Quintet. In 1967 the orchestra performed his Democratic Concerto along with the Fred Stone Quartet.

In 1968 Symonds travelled about rural Canada on a fellowship from the Canada Council, writing and composing; his work became a 13-part radio series titled Travelling Big Lonely.

Symonds' composition "A Gift of Thanksgiving" was performed in 1980 by the Toronto Symphony Orchestra. In 1987 his work was included on the National Arts Centre Orchestra recording Canadian Classics Vol. 2.

== Selected compositions ==
- "Concerto Grosso for Jazz Quintet"
- "Big Lonely"
- "Three Atmospheres"
- "A Gift of Thanksgiving"
