= Gordon Delamont =

Canadian musician

Gordon Arthur Delamont (27 October 1918 – 16 January 1981) was a Canadian music educator, author, composer, and trumpeter. He is best remembered for his work as an educator, having helped shape the talents of dozens of notable musicians in Toronto. He also published several books on musical theory topics which have been used widely by schools in North America. As a writer he also contributed articles to Saturday Night, The Canadian Music Journal, and several jazz magazines and newspapers in Canada. As a composer The Canadian Encyclopedia describes him as "a guiding figure in Canada in the third-stream movement" His best-known work, Three Entertainments for Saxophone Quartet (premiered 1969, published by Kendor 1970), was recorded by the New York Saxophone Quartet and has been performed widely throughout North America and Europe.

== Life ==
Born in Moose Jaw, Delamont was the son of bandmaster and cornetist Arthur Delamont. He grew up in Vancouver where he was a soloist with a boys' band that his father directed. His father provided him with his earliest musical training. In 1939 he moved to Toronto at the age of 20 where he became principal trumpet of CBC Radio's orchestra in that city and played lead trumpet in local dance bands. From 1945 to 1949 he led a dance band that was based at the Club Top Hat in Toronto.

In 1949 Delamont went to New York City to study arranging, composition, and pedagogy with Maury Deutsch. He returned later that year to open his own private teaching studio in Toronto where he offered instruction in harmony, counterpoint, composition, and music theory. He taught up until his death more than 30 years later. His notable pupils include Peter Appleyard, Gustav Ciamaga, Ron Collier, Jimmy Dale, Hagood Hardy, Herbie Helbig, Paul Hoffert, Moe Koffman, Rob McConnell, Ben McPeek, Bernie Piltch, Paul Read, Fred Stone, Norman Symonds, Rick Wilkins, Maribeth Solomon, Paul Benton, among others.

Another student, Whitney Smith, produced a 90-minute radio documentary for CBC in 1979 entitled, "Gordon Delamont: Taking the Notes Where They Want to Go".

== Books ==
- Modern Arranging Techniques (Delavan, NY 1965)
- Modern Harmonic Techniques, 2 vols (Delavan, NY 1965)
- Modern Contrapuntal Techniques (Delavan, NY 1969)
- Modern Twelve-Tone Techniques (Delavan, NY 1973)
- Modern Melodic Techniques (Delavan, NY 1976)
