= Ralph Horner (conductor) =

Ralph Joseph Horner was a British (later naturalised American) conductor and composer. He studied music at the Leipzig Conservatory. Between 1878 and 1888 he conducted D'Oyly Carte Opera Company tours of Gilbert and Sullivan operas. He conducted the world premiere of The Pirates of Penzance – a single matinee performance in 1879 to secure the British copyright. In 1906 he emigrated to North America, taking US citizenship, and from 1909 until his death he lived in Winnipeg in Canada, where he became a leading figure in Canadian musical life.

== Life and career ==
=== Early years ===
Horner was born on 28 April 1848 in Newport, Monmouthshire, Wales, the elder son of James Horner and his wife Sarah, née Aldridge. Horner senior owned a substantial bootmaking business, and it was expected that his son would pursue a business career, but he was drawn to music, despite parental disapproval. He studied at the Leipzig Conservatory between 1864 and 1867 under Ignaz Moscheles and Carl Reinecke, both of whom had taught Arthur Sullivan a few years earlier. (Note: Sullivan was at the Leipzig Conservatory from 1858 to 1861.)

After graduating from Leipzig, Horner returned to Britain and pursued a musical career in London. He conducted choral performances and operatic productions for the Peckham Choral Society and was choirmaster at St Mary's Church, Peckham. For seven years he directed the English Opera Company on tour, as well as operas at Alexandra Palace, London. He taught piano, singing, and harmony.

=== D'Oyly Carte and Nottingham ===
In the 1870s and 1880s, Richard D'Oyly Carte, the impresario responsible for presenting the operas of Gilbert and Sullivan, ran several touring companies simultaneously, under conductors including Alfred Cellier, Hamilton Clarke, Frederick Corder, P. W. Halton, and Auguste van Biene. Horner first conducted for D'Oyly Carte in 1879.

Of the thirteen now extant Gilbert and Sullivan works, Horner conducted seven: The Sorcerer, H.M.S. Pinafore, The Pirates of Penzance, Iolanthe, Princess Ida. The Mikado and Ruddigore. He conducted the world premiere of The Pirates of Penzance hours before the piece was given in New York, conducted by the composer; under the laws then in force a performance in Britain was needed to secure the British copyright. This was given at a matinee in Paignton by Carte's "Second Pinafore Company" on 30 December 1879. Horner also conducted the first performance of Ruddigore outside London, in 1887.

In between D'Oyly Carte engagements, Horner was musical director for the Willie Edouin Company's touring production of George Dance's burlesque novelty Oliver Grumble (March–June 1886). After his last spell with the company he was musical director at the Strand Theatre in London for a revival of Cellier's The Sultan of Mocha (September 1877–January 1888).

After leaving D'Oyly Carte, Horner settled in Nottingham, where he conducted the Nottingham Amateur Orchestral Society, the Nottingham Operatic Society, and the Nottingham Philharmonic Choir. He lectured in music at University College in Nottingham for ten years. In 1893 he graduated BMus and in 1898 was awarded a DMus, both at the University of Durham. (Note: At that time (and until 1980) music degrees from Durham could be obtained by examinations, without the requirement of residential tuition.)

=== North America ===
In January 1906 Horner sailed to North America, and in August of that year he applied for US citizenship. For a brief period he lived in New York and in 1909 he moved to Winnipeg in Canada. There, he was named director of the Imperial Academy of Music and Arts, a position he held until 1911. He was music editor from 1909 to 1914 of Winnipeg Town Topics, the weekly journal of cultural, musical and artistic matters, and from 1909 to 1912 he conducted the Winnipeg Oratorio Society.

Horner also directed an opera company, which in 1912 presented his comic opera The Belles of Barcelona, with a plot about two young women who refuse to marry the men their fathers have chosen for them. Horner was a founder-member of the Men's Musical Club of Manitoba, and served as vice-president during its inaugural year, 1915–16.

During the First World War, Horner served as bandmaster to two Canadian infantry battalions. After the war he resumed teaching music in Winnipeg and served as choirmaster of St Matthew's Church from 1921 to 1925. From about 1917 until his death he directed the Ralph Horner Opera Company in Winnipeg.

Horner became ill in mid-1925 and died in Winnipeg on 7 April 1926, aged 78

== Compositions ==
In addition to The Belles of Barcelona, Horner's compositions include the opera Amy Robsart, six operettas (including Four by Honours), two oratorios (St Peter and David's First Victory), four sacred cantatas, a symphony, chamber music, and about a hundred songs.

== Notes, references and sources ==
=== Sources ===
- Jacobs, Arthur (1984). Arthur Sullivan: A Victorian Musician. Oxford and New York: Oxford University Press. ISBN 978-0-19-315443-8.
- Rollins, Cyril; R. John Witts (1962). The D'Oyly Carte Opera Company in Gilbert and Sullivan Operas: A Record of Productions, 1875–1961. London: Michael Joseph. OCLC 504581419.
- Young, Percy M. (1971). Sir Arthur Sullivan. London: J. M. Dent & Sons. ISBN 978-0-460-03934-5.
