= Jan Hambourg =

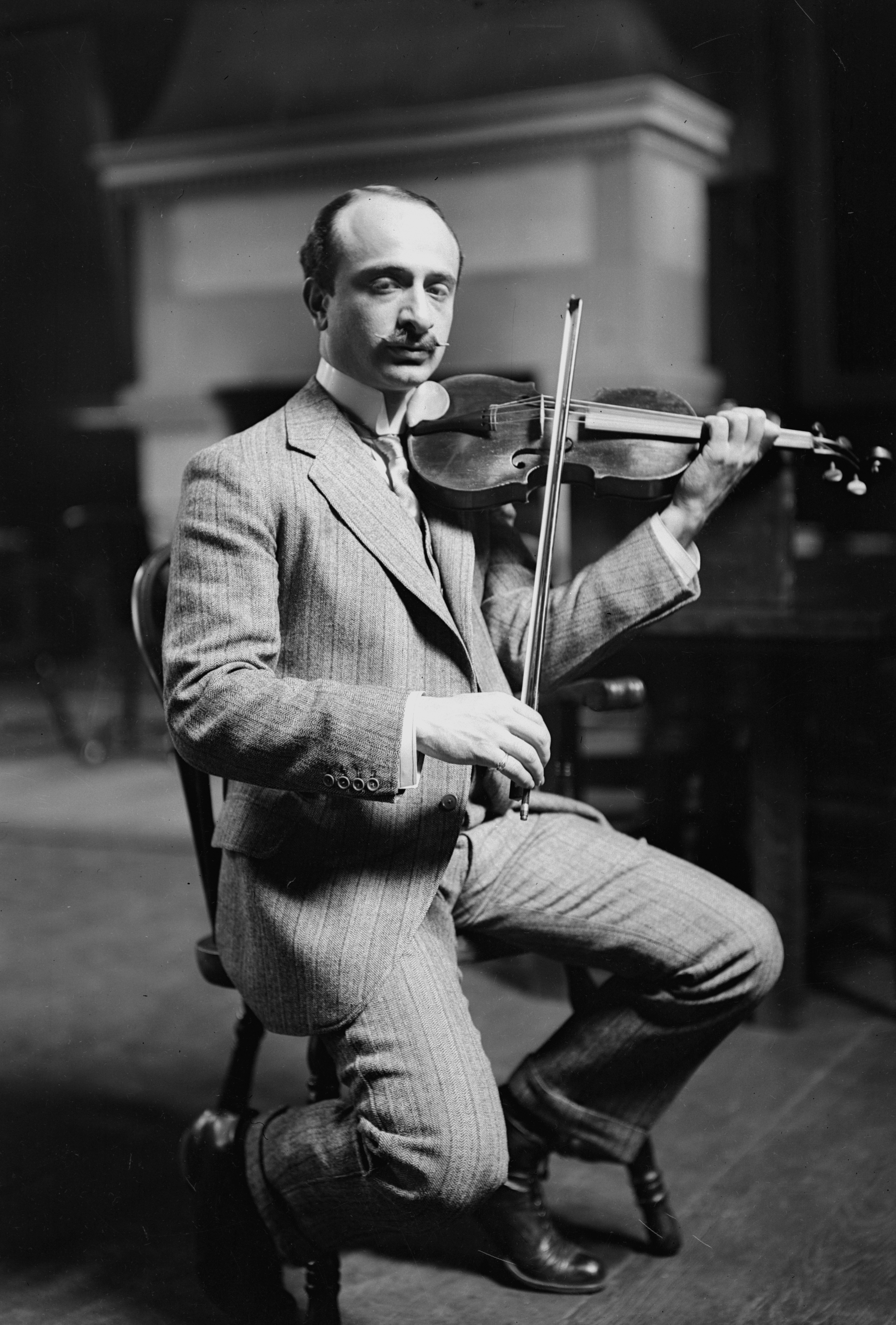
- Hambourg photographed in 1912 by M.O. Hammond
- Born: 8 September [O.S. 27 August] 1882; Voronezh, Russian Empire
- Died: September 29, 1947 (aged 65); Tours, France
- Spouse: Isabelle McClung (m. 1916; died 1938)
- Relatives: Mark Hambourg (brother); Boris Hambourg (brother)
- Musical career
- Instrument: Violin
- Years active: 1905–c. 1939

Jan Hambourg (8 September [O.S. 27 August] 1882 – 29 September 1947) was a violinist, a member of a famous musical family, who made his career in Europe during the early 20th century.

Hambourg was born in Voronezh, Russian Empire, the middle brother between the famous pianist Mark Hambourg (b. 1879) and the distinguished cellist Boris Hambourg (b. 1884), the sons of pianist Michael Hambourg (1855-1916). Jan studied first in London with August Wilhelmj and Émile Sauret in London, then in Frankfurt-am-Main with Hikeerman, in Prague with Otakar Ševčík and in Brussels with Eugène Ysaÿe, who also gave instruction to his brother Boris.

Hambourg made his debut in Berlin in 1905. In 1911 he co-founded the Hambourg Conservatory of Music with his father and his brother Boris. Jan and Boris succeeded their father as co-directors of the school in 1916. That year he married the wealthy Isabelle McClung, the daughter of Judge Samuel McClung of Pittsburg. Isabelle had previously lived with the novelist Willa Cather for 15 years.

In 1920 he moved to Europe where he was active as a concert violinist. In 1934 Jan Hambourg was co-editor of a respected edition of Bach's solo partitas, with particular attention to the bowing.

Hambourg died in Tours, France during a concert tour.

Hambourg was the owner of the Vesuvio Stradivarius violin, made by Antonio Stradivari in 1727, subsequently owned by Antonio Brosa and then by Remo Lauricella.
