= Boris Hambourg =

Canadian cellist (1885–1954)

- Борис Гамбург
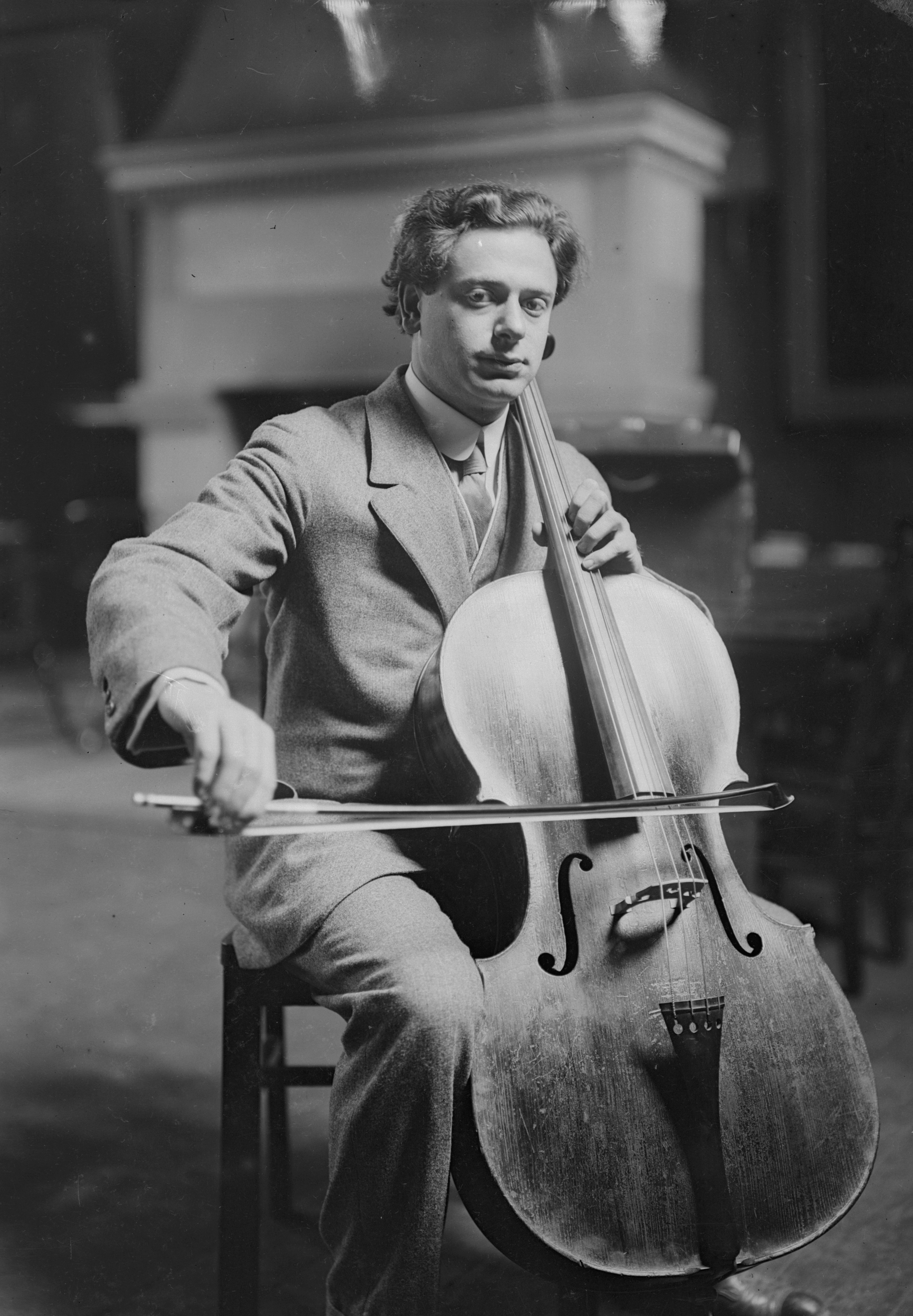
- Hambourg photographed by M.O. Hammond, 1912
- Born: 8 January 1885 [O.S. 27 December 1884] Voronezh, Russia
- Died: November 24, 1954 (aged 69); Toronto, Ontario, Canada
- Citizenship: Canadian
- Spouse: Maria Bauchope (m. 1923–1954)
- Relatives: Mark Hambourg (brother); Jan Hambourg (brother)
- Musical career
- Instrument: Cello
- Years active: 1903–1954

Boris Hambourg (Russian: Борис Михайлович Гамбург; 8 January 1885 [O.S. 27 December 1884] – 24 November 1954) was a Russian and Canadian cellist and music educator who settled in Toronto, Ontario, and made his career in the United States, Canada, England and Europe. With his father, the pianist Michael Hambourg, and his brother, the violinist Jan Hambourg, he co-founded the Hambourg Conservatory of Music in 1911. He succeeded his father as director of that school in 1916; remaining in that position until 1951.

== Early life ==
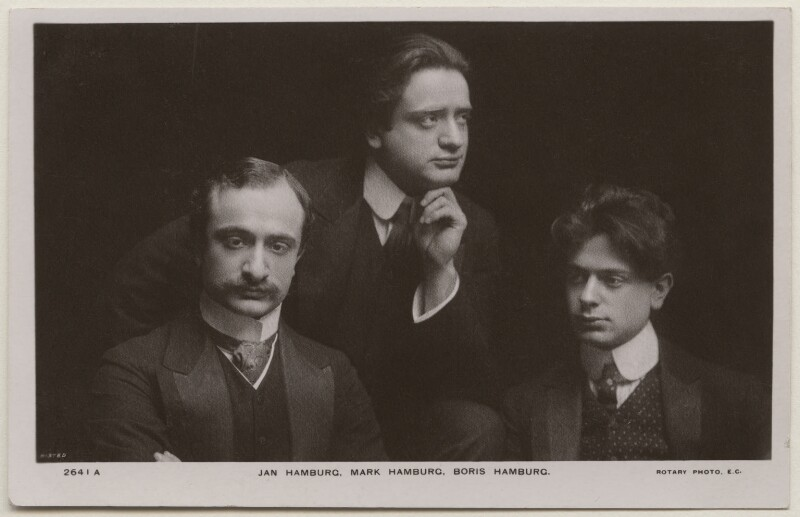
Boris Hambourg (centre) with his brothers Jan (left) and Mark (right)

Hambourg was born in Voronez, south Russia, the third son of Michael and Catherine Hambourg, and the younger brother of the pianist Mark Hambourg (1879–1960) and the violinist Jan Hambourg (1882–1947). The three sons came with their family to London in 1890; they were encouraged in music from an early age, and were taught instruments which enabled them to play together in chamber music ensemble, as the Hambourg Trio. Boris began his studies in 1892, and after devoting some time to piano, decided to specialize in the cello. He studied at the Hoch Conservatory in Frankfurt-am-Main from 1898 to 1903, taking lessons from Herbert Walenn and later from Hugo Becker.

== Career ==
In 1903, Hambourg made a concert tour of Australia and New Zealand, and in 1904 he took part in the first Tchaikovsky Festival in Germany, held at Pyrmont. In 1904–1905, he went to Belgium at the invitation of Eugène Ysaÿe, who further developed his musical art in interpretation and style. Boris Hambourg made his London debut in 1905, and his American debut in 1910. He was a member of the Hart House String Quartet and the Hambourg String Quartet (the other members being Jan Hambourg, John Robinson and Eric Coates).

Hambourg moved with his family to Canada, becoming a naturalised Canadian in 1910. He performed with his family trio, and appeared as a soloist in many different places before settling in Toronto, where he took part in founding the Hambourg Conservatory of Music in Wellesley Street (a private school which closed in 1951), and became its director.

He toured frequently with Toronto's Hart House String Quartet, and continued to appear in concert with many orchestras in the United States and Europe, and in England appeared as soloist with the Queen's Hall Orchestra and the London Symphony Orchestra. He remained a member of the Hambourg Trio until his death in 1954.

== Sources ==
- A. Eaglefield-Hull, Dictionary of Modern Music and Musicians (Dent, London 1924).
