= Ron Collier =

- Born: Ronald William Collier; July 3, 1930; Coleman, Alberta, Canada
- Died: October 22, 2003 (aged 73) Toronto, Ontario
- Genres: Jazz
- Occupations: Musician, composer, arranger
- Instrument: Trombone

Ron Collier, OC (July 3, 1930 – October 22, 2003) was a Canadian jazz trombonist, composer, and arranger. He performed in and led a number of jazz groups, and created orchestrations for and recorded with Duke Ellington.

== Early life and education ==
A native of Coleman, Alberta, Collier began his musical training in Vancouver. He was a member of the Kitsilano Boys' Band. He studied music privately in Toronto with Gordon Delamont. The first jazz musician to receive a Canada Council grant, he studied orchestration in New York in 1961 and 1962.

== Career ==
Collier formed the Ron Collier Jazz Quartet, which performed in the 1950s at the Stratford Festival and on CBC's Tabloid with Portia White, and in 1963 with the Winnipeg Symphony Orchestra.

Duke Ellington performed with the Ron Collier Orchestra on the 1969 album North of the Border in Canada. The album included compositions by several Canadian composers, including Collier. Collier created orchestrations for a number of Ellington's concerts and recordings.

Collier composed the scores to the films Face-Off (1971), A Fan's Notes (1972), and Paperback Hero (1973). In the 1970s, he began directing a student orchestra at Toronto's Humber College. His band won the big Band Open Class at the Canadian Stage Band Festival in 1982 .

In 2003, he was made an Officer of the Order of Canada. He died in October that year in Toronto, aged 73.
