= Crest Theatre Foundation production history =

This is a list of the productions mounted by the Crest Theatre Foundation of Toronto, Ontario, Canada during its 1954 to 1966 existence. The theatre was an important venue providing opportunities to Canadian actors and directors on a professional stage.

== 1954 ==
Title	Director	Principal cast	Premiere
Richard of Bordeaux	John Blatchley	Neil Vipond, John Clark, Murray Davis, Barbara Chilcott, Eric House, George McCowan, Patrick Macnee, Norma Renault, Betty Leighton	Jan. 5
The Philadelphia Story	John Blatchley	Mary Laura Wood, Joan Blackman, Betty Leighton, Bruce Swerdfager, John Clark, Eric House, Barbara Chilcott, George McCowan,	Jan. 19
The Light of Heart	Pierre Lefevre	Margot Lassner, Eric House, Mary Laura Wood, Max Helpmann, Donald Davis, Barbara Chilcott, George McCowan, Betty Leighton	Feb. 2
Lord Arthur Saville's Crime	Pierre Lefevre	Donald Davis, Murray Davis, Max Helpmann, George McCowan, Bruce Swerdfager, Eric House, Harold Burke, John Blatchley, Josephine Barrington, Mary Laura Wood, Norma Renault	Feb. 16
Miss Julie; Sorry, Wrong Number	John Blatchley	Betty Leighton, Barbara Chilcott, Pierre Lefevre, Deborah Cass	March 2
Escapade	John Blatchley	Betty Leighton, Virgina Snyder, Drew Thompson, George McCowan, Eric House, Pierre Lefevre, Barbara Chilcott	March 16
Murder in the Cathedral	Pierre Lefevre	Donald Davis, Eric House, Bruce Swerdfager, John Clark, George McCowan, Bruce Swerdfager, Max Helpmann, Pierre Lefevre, Barbara Chilcott, Betty Leighton, John Washbrook, John Clark, Alan Caillou, Shirley Knight	April 6
Dream Girl	Pierre Lefevre	Toby Robins, John Clark, Bruce Swerdfager, Antonia Pemberton, George McCowan, Betty Leighton, Drew Thompson, Barbara Chilcott, Elspeth Cochrane, Murray Davis, Eric House, Donald Davis, John Blatchley, Max Helpmann, Michael Poole, Pegeen Rose	April 20
Haste to the Wedding	John Blatchley	Patrick Macnee, George McCowan, Drew Thompson, Donald Davis, Eric House, Max Helpmann, Pierre Lefevre, Betty Leighton, Toby Robins, Barbara Chilcott, Antonia Pemberton	May 4
The Little Hut	John Blatchley	Murray Davis, Antonia Pemberton, Norman Ettlinger, John Clark, Pierre Lefevre	May 18

== 1954–55 ==
Title	Director	Principal cast	Premiere
A Jig for the Gypsy	Herbert Whittaker	Donald Davis, Norma Renault, Barbara Chilcott, Norman Ettlinger, George McCowan, Max Helpmann, Eric House, Neil Vipond, David Gardner, Bruce Swerdfager	Sept. 14
The Man Who Came to Dinner	Julia Murphy	Kathleen Kidd, Norma Renault, Neil Vipond, Betty Allen, Joan Westlake, Amelia Hall, Bruce Swerdfager, Barbara Chilcott, David Gardner, Max Helpmann, George McCowan, Peter Mews, Betty Leighton, Charles Allen, John Clark, Brian Phelen, Bill Lazaruk	Sept. 28
The Living Room	Herbert Whittaker	Betty Leighton, Donald Davis, Peter Mews, Amelia Hall, Aileen Seaton	Oct. 12
Charley's Aunt	Basil Coleman	Peter Mews, Norman Ettlinger, Jack Medhurst, Eric House, Barbara Chilcott, Lois Shaw, George McCowan, Max Helpmman, Betty Leighton, Margaret Griffin	Oct. 26
The Confidential Clerk	Basil Coleman	Donald Davis, Douglas Rain, Peter Mews, George McCowan, Frances Hyland, Barbara Chilcott, Betty Leighton	Nov. 16
Lady from Edinburgh	Brian Maller	Eric House, Amelia Hall, Barbara Chilcott, George McCown, Joan Westlake, Murray Matheson, Betty Leighton	Nov. 30
Christmas in the Market Place	Basil Coleman	Donald Davis, Amelia Hall, Eric House, Barbara Chilcott, David Sniderman	Dec. 14
Beauty and the Beast	Basil Coleman	Frances Hyland, Eric House, Robert Jackson, Murray Davis, Harold Burke, Rose Mary Sowby, Joan Blackman	Dec. 28
Twelfth Night	Basil Coleman	George McCowan, James Pearce, Noel Wagner, Grant Reddick, John Maddison, Donald Davis, Murray Davis, Barbara Chilcott, Frances Hyland, Betty Leighton	Jan. 18
The Biggest Thief in Town	Henry Kaplan	David Gardner, George McCowan, Rose Mary Sowby, Leslie Lawrence, Max Helpmann, Betty Leighton, Eric House, Harold Burke, Grant Reddick, Donald Davis	Feb. 1
Marching Song	Basil Coleman	Budd Knapp, Frances Hyland, George McCowan, Eric House, Barbara Chilcott, Murray Davis, Donald Davis, Grant Reddick, James Pearce	Feb. 15
Diary of a Scoundrel	Michael Langham	William Hutt, Amelia Hall, Eric House, Grant Reddick, George McCowan, Deborah Cass, Louis Negin, Norman Roland, Murray Davis, Barbara Hamilton, Betty Leighton	March 1
Meeting at Night	Michael Langham	Barbara Chilcott, Eric House, Max Helpmann, Donald Davis, Betty Leighton	March 15
The Prisoner	Herbert Whittaker	Douglas Campbell, Murray Davis, Max Helpmann, Graham Parker, Grant Reddick, James Pearce, Paddy Croft	March 29
When We Are Married	Michael Langham	Deborah Cass, Jane Mallett, Douglas Campbell, Amelia Hall, Barbara Hamilton, Grant Reddick, Audrey Kniveton, George McCowan, Norman Ettlinger, Betty Leighton	April 12
The Gift of the Serpent	Brian Maller	Toby Robins, Grant Reddick, George McCowan, Hugh Webster, Eric House, Bruce Belfrage Roland Hewgill, Bruno Gerussi, Joseph Furst, Barbara Chilcott	May 3
Hay Fever	Brian Maller	Amelia Hall, Diana Vandervlis, William Job, Norman Ettlinger, Aileen Seaton, James Edmond, Sylvia Gillespie, John Clark, Paddy Croft	May 17

== 1955–56 ==
Title	Director	Principal cast	Premiere
They Knew What They Wanted	Basil Coleman	Bruno Gerussi, Frederick Valk, Janet Reid, Edwin Stephenson, James Edmond, Graham Parker, Lloyd Jones	Sept. 20
The Fourposter	Joseph Furst	Barbara Chilcott, Max Helpmann	Oct. 11
Othello	Basil Coleman	Frederick Valk, Tony van Bridge, David Gardner, Alan Nunn, Bruce Swerdfager, Jonathan White, Charles Hayter, William Job, Murray Davis, Grant Reddick, Diana Vandervlis, Barbara Chilcott	Oct. 25
Hunting Stuart	Basil Coleman	Frances Tobias, Diana Vandervlis, Helene Winston, Donald Davis, Eric House, Max Helpmann, Barbara Chilcott	Nov. 22
Saint Joan	Douglas Campbell	Douglas Campbell, William Hutt, Ted Follows, Frances Hyland, Roland Hewgill, John Gardiner, George McCowan, Jack Hutt	Dec. 5
Christmas in the Market Place	Basil Coleman	Amelia Hall, Donald Davis, Eric House, Barbara Chilcott, Hayward Morse	Dec. 13
An Inspector Calls	Brian Maller	Frances Tobias, Norman Ettlinger, Diana Vandervlis, William Job, Alan Nunn, Paddy Croft, William Needles	Dec. 28
You Never Can Tell	Basil Coleman	William Needles, Amelia Hall, Janet Reid, Murray Davis, Robin Gammell, Paddy Croft	Jan. 10-
The Rainmaker	Henry Kaplan	Kate Reid, Jonathan White, William Needles, John Sullivan, Grant Reddick	Jan. 24-
The School for Scandal	Basil Coleman	Toby Robins, Amelia Hall, Richard Easton, Araby Lockhart, William Needles	Feb. 14-
Come Back, Little Sheba	Herbert Whittaker	Amelia Hall, Donald Davis, Deborah Cass, John Vernon, Deborah Turnbull	March 6-
Antigone	Basil Coleman	Barbara Chilcott, Diana Vandervlis, Amelia Hall, Donald Davis, Grant Reddick, Murray Davis	Mar. 20-
Present Laughter	Herbert Whittaker	William Hutt, Douglas Rain, Amelia Hall, Deborah Cass	April 3-
Murder at the Vicarage	Basil Coleman	Ron Hartmann, Charmion King, Deborah Cass, Sylvia Gillespie, Edwin Stephenson, Jacqueline Barnett, William Job, Joan White, Margery Weston, Alan Nunn	April 24-
The Indifferent Shepherd	Brian Maller	Barbara Chilcott, Sylvia Gillespie, Alan Nunn, Murray Davis	May 8-
The Women	George McCowan	Norma Renault, Barbara Chilcott, Patricia Moffatt, Araby Lockhart, Katherine Blake	May 23-
Zone	Leo Orenstein	George Luscombe, Jonathan White, Cec Linder, Brock Shoveller, Tom Busby	June 12-

== 1956–57 ==
Title	Director	Principal cast	Premiere
Gigi	George McCowan	Kate Reid, Austin Willis, Sylvia Gillespie, Cosette Lee, Joanna Clarke, Alan Nunn	September 11
Misery Me	Joseph Furst	Powys Thomas, Charmion King, Willam Job, Vernon Chapman, Sylvia Gillespie	Sept. 25
An Italian Straw Hat	Warren Enters	Richard Easton, Tony van Bridge, Powys Thomaas, Max Helpmann, Charmion King, Barbara Chilcott, John Vernon, Murray Davis	Oct. 9
The Three Sisters	Jack Landau	Kate Reid, Charmion King, Amelia Hall, Powys Thomas, Donald Davis, Richard Easton, Tony van Bridge, William Job, Roberta Maxwell, Alan Nunn	Oct. 23
Antony and Cleopatra	Douglas Campbell	Max Helpmann, Richard Easton, Powys Thomas, Barbara Chilcott, Edwin Stephenson, Tony van Bridge	Nov. 13
Village Wooing and How He Lied to Her Husband	Brian Maller	Donald Davis, Betty Leighton, Ian Thomson, William Job, Alan Nunn	Nov. 27
Every Bed is Narrow	Herbert Whittaker	Corinne Orr, Chris Wiggins, Cosette Lee, George Luscombe, James Doohan	Dec. 11
Oh Men! Oh Women!	John Holden	Kate Reid, Austin Willis, Charmion King, Murray Davis, Sylvia Gillespie, Jonathan White, Allan Nun, William Job	Dec. 31
Ah, Wilderness	Warren Enters	Murray Davis, Amelia Hall, Barbara Hamilton, William Job, Sylvia Gillespie	Jan. 15
King of Hearts	Brian Maller	Austin Willis, Barbara Chilcott, Kathleen Livingstone, Jonathan White	Jan. 29
Hobson's Choice	Leonard White	Amelia Hall, Dawn Lesley, Margaret Griffin, Lawrence Beattie, Norman Ettlinger	Feb. 19
The Glass Cage	Henry Kaplan	Murray Davis, Barbara Chilcott, Donald Davis, William Needles, Frank Peddie, Janet Reid, William Job, Edna Pozer, Margot Christie	March 5
See How They Run	Leonard White	Sylvia Gillespie, Cosette Lee, Alan Nunn, Ann Morrish, Geoffrey Alexander	April 2
She Stoops to Conquer	Jack Landau	Amelia Hall, Douglas Rain, Frances Hyland, Richard Easton, Tom Kneebone	April 22
Anniversary Waltz	John Holden	Austin Willis, Diana Maddox, Sylvia Gillespie, Jane Mallett, Bernard Slade	May 14
Pillars of Society	Malcolm Black	Douglas Ney, Edna Dick, Guy Bannerman Jean McGee, John Rammell	July 30

== 1957–58 ==
Title	Director	Principal cast	Premiere
Witness for the Prosecution	John Holden	Mavor Moore, Jonathan White, Ronald Hartmann, Leo Leyden, Vernon Chapman	Oct. 1
Janus	Leonard White	Anna Cameron, Austin Willis, John Sullivan, Maud Whitmore, Ronald Hartmann	Oct. 30
Bright Sun at Midnight	Leonard White	John Drainie, John Holden, Larry Mann, Maud Whitmore, James Doohan	Nov. 27
Let's Make an Opera	Basil Coleman	Jeanne Pengelly, David Ouchterlony, Maxinne Miller, Donald Bartle, Rhoda Pendleton	Dec. 18
Witness for the Prosecution (Second run)	John Holden	Mavor Moore, Jonathan White, Ronald Hartmann, Leo Leyden, Vernon Chapman	Jan. 14
The Cherry Orchard	Jack Landau	Charmion King, Norma Renault, Donald Davis, Henry Ramer, Anna Reisner	Jan. 29
Visit to a Small Planet	Barry Morse	John Drainie, Jack Creley, Jane Mallett, Toby Robins, Robert Goulet, Barry Morse	Feb. 18
The Potting Shed	Basil Coleman	Earle Grey, Charmion King, Melanie Morse, Nancy Pyper, Geoffrey Alexander	April 9
Double Image	Malcolm Black	Donald Davis, Jane Mallett, Jack Creley, Leo Leyden, Katherine Blake	April 30
The Ottawa Man	Mavor Moore	William Needles, Drew Thompson, Betty Leighton, Deborah Turnbull, Orest Ulan	May 21
The Mousetrap	Murray Davis	Jill Showell, William Job, Ian Thomson, Maud Whitmore, Geoffrey Alexander	June 11

== 1958–59 ==
Title	Director	Principal cast	Premiere
Salad Days	Barry Morse	Powys Thomas, Barbara Franklin, Walter Burgess, Richard Easton, Gillie Fenwick, Helen Burns, Norma Renault, June Sampson, Tom Kneebone, Jack Creley	Sept. 17
Inherit the Wind	George McCowan	John Drainie, Louis Zorich, William Needles, Cosette Lee, Judith MacLeod, Lew Davidson, Igors Davon	Nov. 5
Pygmalion	Malcolm Black	Douglas Rain, William Needles, Frances Hyland, Tony van Bridge, Josephine Barrington, Cosette Lee, Kathleen Kidd Edwin Stephenson, Lew Davidson, Judith MacLeod, Igors Davon	Dec. 3
This Is Our First Affair: A Crest Revue		Jane Mallett, Joseph Shaw, Corinne Conley, Meg Walter, Eric House, John Baylis, Phyllis Marshall, John Polanyi	Jan. 1
Thunder Rock	George Keathley	Robert Goulet, Hugh Webster, William Greenhalgh, Donald Meyer, Alan Chrysler	Feb. 4
Summer of the Seventeenth Doll	George McCowan	Barbara Chilcott, Max Helpmann, Anne Collings Katherine Blake, Hugh Webster, Ruth Springford	Feb. 25
The Entertainer	George McCowan	Eric House, Tony van Bridge, Moira Troup, Timothy Findley, Betty Leighton, Joy Webster	March 18
My Three Angels	Leon Major	Dawn Greenhalgh, Lew Davidson, Louis Zorich, Timothy Findley	April 15
Ride a Pink Horse	Word Baker	Eric House, Jack Creley, Norma Renault, Margaret de Priest, Sam Greene	May 7
The Hollow	Leon Major	Deborah Cass, Joseph Shaw, Betty Leighton, Norman Welsh Lew Davidson	May 30
Two for the Seesaw	Leon Major	Toby Robins, George McCowan	Aug. 6

== 1959–60 ==
Title	Director	Principal cast	Premiere
The Matchmaker	Murray Davis	Amelia Hall, Powys Thomas, Charmion King, Martha Henry, Norma Renault, Hugh Webster	Sept. 23
Under Milk Wood	Powys Thomas	Norma Renault, Amelia Hall, Charmion King, Sylvia Gillespie, John Vernon, Martha Henry	Oct. 14
Mrs. Gibbons' Boys	George McCowan	Norma Renault, Amelia Hall, Douglas Chamberlin, Powys Thomas, Geoffrey Alexander	Nov. 4
Macbeth	Mavor Moore	Powys Thomas, Charmion King, John Vernon, Geoffrey Alexander, Martha Henry, Irene Mayeska, Edna Pozer, Amelia Hall	Dec. 2
You Can't Take It With You	George McCowan	Amelia Hall, Sylvia Gillespie, Doris Ferguson, Geoffrey Alexander, Douglas Chamberlain, John Vernon, Amba Trott	Dec. 23
The Schoolmistress	Jean Roberts, Murray Davis	Amelia Hall, Martha Henry, Charmion King, Marigold Charlesworth, John Vernon, Sylvia Gillespie, Edwin Stephenson	Jan. 20
Heartbreak House	Royston Morley	Marigold Charlesworth, Amelia Hall, Powys Thomas, Charmion King, Norma Renault	Feb. 17
Honour Thy Father	George McCowan	Norma Renault, Martha Henry, Charmion King, Powys Thomas, Geoffrey Alexander	March 9
The Seagull	Royston Morley	Charmion King, William Job, Powys Thomas, Martha Henry, Eric Heath, Kathleen Kidd	April 1
The Unexpected Guest	Jean Roberts	Dawn Greenhalgh, Geoffrey Alexander, Cosette Lee, Roy Wordworth, George Spelvin	April 20
African Holiday	Alvin Ailey	Brock Peters	May 23

== 1960–61 ==
Title	Director	Principal cast	Premiere
Epitaph for George Dillon	George McCowan	Martha Henry, Charmion King, Betty Leighton, Patricia Moffatt, Henry Comor, Andrew Allan	Sept. 12
Long Day's Journey into Night	Leon Major	Gwen Ffrangcon-Davies, David Hooks, James Douglas, George Luscombe, Pat Tully	Oct. 5
The Different Aspects of Love; An afternoon of poetry and drama	Gwen Ffrangcon-Davies	Gwen Ffrangcon-Davies	Oct. 30
The Long and the Short and the Tall	Murray Davis, Alan Nunn	Geoffrey Alexander, James Begg, Bill Brydon, James Douglas, William Fredric, Bill Glover, William Job, Ken Kusukake	Nov. 3
King Lear	David Gardner	Mavor Moore, James Doohan, James Douglas, Toby Tarnow, William Job, Eric House, Charles Palmer, James Begg, Peter Mews, Bill Brydon, Barbara Alleyn, John Douglas, Mary Savidge	Nov. 23
The Marriage-Go-Round	Murray Davis	Austin Willis, Barbara Chilcott, Markyta Mares, Daryl Masters	Dec. 14
The Long and the Short and the Tall (Second run)	Murray Davis, Alan Nunn	Geoffrey Alexander, James Begg, Bill Brydon, James Douglas, William Fredric, Bill Glover, William Job, Ken Kusukake	Jan. 17
The Gay Chaperone	John Fenwick	Barbara Hamilton, Peter Mews, Marcel fugere, Betty Pope, Annabelle Adams, Robert Jeffrey, Lawrence Beattie, Douglas Chamberlain, Diane Gibson	Feb. 1
The Heiress	Leon Major	Frances Hyland, Norman Welsh, Cosette Lee, Pat Tully, Aileen Seaton, Ron Hastings, Annabelle Adams, Peter Donat	March 1
Spring Thaw '61	Mavor Moore	Barbara Hamilton, Dave Broadfoot, Peter Mews, Jean Templeton, Jack Duffy, Betty Robertson, Leo Leyden, William Cole, Gale Gerber	March 29

== 1961–62 ==
Title	Director	Principal cast	Premiere
Big Fish, Little Fish	Murray Davis	Barbara Hamilton, Larry Mann, Tom Harvey, Cec Linder, Jonathan White, Marigold Charlesworth, Arno Gotthardt	Sept. 18
Zoo Story	Leon Major	William Needles, Bruno Gerussi	Oct. 10
Krapp's Last Tape	Alan Schneider	Donald Davis	Oct. 10
The Madwoman of Chaillot	Leon Major	Charmion King, Kate Reid, Barbara Hamilton, Barbara Chilcott, Gordon Pinsent, Bruno Gerussi, Jean Cavall, Bernard Behrens, James Douglas, John Codner, Drew Thompson, Julie Rekai, Lloyd Dean	Nov. 8
Simon Says Get Married	Murray Davis	Austin Willis, Jill Foster, Drew Thompson, Irena Mayeska, Winnifred Dennis, Jay Hutchinson	Dec. 6
Caesar and Cleopatra	Leon Major	Toby Robins, Mavor Moore, Frances Hyland, Gordon Pinsent, Jonathan White, Geoffrey Alexander, Cosette Lee, Bernard Behrens, William Brydon, Dave Mann, Julie Rekai	Jan. 4
The Shifting Heart	Murray Davis	Barbara Chilcott, Helene Winston, William Brydon, Arno Gotthardt, Moya Fenwick, Geoffrey Alexander	Feb. 7
Roots	Murray Davis	Barbara Chilcott, Hugh Webster, William Brydon, Christine Bennett, Gordon Pinsent, Rosemary Palin, Mary Warren	Feb. 28
Roar Like a Dove	Murray Davis	Charmion King, Austin Willis, Helene Winston, Drew Thompson, Gerard Parkes	March 21
Spring Thaw '62	Leon Major	Barbara Hamilton, Don Francks, Peter Mews, Corinne Conley, Betty Robertson, Bill Cole, Arno Gotthardt, Maureen Hill, Wally Martin Loree Lee, Tink Robinson	April 11
The American Dream; The Zoo Story (at Grenville St. Playhouse)	Fred Euringer	Lynne Gorman, James Edmond, Norma Renault, Lynn Orr Larry Perkins, Jack Creley	April 13

== 1962–63 ==
Title	Director	Principal cast	Premiere
Twelve Angry Men	Fred Euringer	James Beggs, William Brydon, Murray Davis, James Edmond, Ken James, Sean Mulcahy	Sept. 12
Who'll Save the Ploughboy	Harvey Hart	William Brydon, Tobi Weinberg, George Sperdakos, Sydney Sturgess, Paul Welsh, Joseph Rabinovitch	Oct. 10
Clandestine on the Morning Line	Curt Reis	Barbara Hamilton, Joe Austin, Ken James, Beth Morris, Michael Tabbit, Paul Welsh	Oct. 31
Orpheus Descending	Harvey Hart	Charmion King, Barbara Chilcott, Robert Christie, Beth Amos, Peter Boretski, Mary Warren	Nov. 22
The Enchanted	Leon Major	Martha Henry, Norman Welsh, Bernard Behrens, Joseph Shaw, Barbara Pearce	Dec. 12
Arms and the Man	Murray Davis	William Brydon, Cosette Lee, Jackie Burroughs, Gordon Pinsent, Gerard Parkes, Joyce Gordon	Jan. 9
La Bonne Soupe	Henry Kaplan	Tom Kneebone, Louis Negin, Barbara Chilcott, Roderick Cook, Julie Rekai, Josephine Barrington	Feb. 14
I Remember Mama	Rein Andre	Heinar Piller, Valve Andre, Natalie Baums, Klaus Seifert, Rudite Purvs Dina Boot	March 10
The Seven Year Itch	George Axelrod	Douglas Rain, Toby Tarnow, Jill Foster, Ivor Barry	March 14
Cat on a Hot Tin Roof	John Hirsch	Toby Robins, Bruno Gerussi, Ruth Springford, Jill Foster, Ron Bishop, Tom Harvey, Matthew Ferguson, Stephen Sugar	April 10
That Hamilton Woman	Alan Lund	Barbara Hamilton, Tom Kneebone, Bill Walker, Don Francks, Bill Dana	May 8
The Sound of Murder	Roderick Cook	Paul Harding, Donald Ewer, Beth Morris, Elspeth Gaylor, Michael Tait, Joel Kenyon	June 19

== 1963–64 ==
Title	Director	Principal cast	Premiere
Four Faces	Rocco Bufano	Toby Robins, Bruno Gerussi, Tom Harvey	Sept. 16
Juno and the Paycock	Rocco Bufano	Robert Christie, Maureen Fitzgerald, Jackie Burroughs, William Brydon, Neil Dainard, Gerard Parkes, Barbara Bryne, Sean Sullivan	Oct. 18
Of Mice and Men	Curt Reis	Sean Sullivan, Ken James, Jackie Burroughs, William Brydon, Michael Snow, Peter Cullen, Chris Wiggins	Oct. 22
Born Yesterday	Murray Davis	William Brydon, Marilyn Gardner, Chris Wiggins, Michael Tait, Michael Snow	Oct. 25
Mr. Scrooge	Murray Davis	Chris Wiggins, Michael Tait, Ken James, Michael Snow, Bill Glover, Barbara Bryne, Michael Dodds, Barbara Gryffe, Mary Jane Saunders, Michael Hamilton, Jackie Burroughs	Dec. 4
Hamlet	Jean Roberts, Marigold Charlesworth	Richard Monette, Barbara Chilcott, Jackie Burroughs, Robert Christie, William Brydon, Neil Dainard, Roland Hewgill, Michael Tait	Jan. 14
Caesar and Cleopatra	Curt Reis	Frances Hyland, Chris Wiggins, Willam Brydon, Maureen Fitzgerald, Roland Hewgill, Jackie Burroughs, Sarah Moffatt	Feb. 8
The Little Foxes	Richard Howard	Tobi Weinberg, William Brydon, Roberta Maxwell, Roland Hewgill, Doris Ferguson, Floyd Tuzo, Barbara Bryne	March 11
A Far Country	Rocco Bufano	Zoe Caldwell, Roland Hewgill, Roberta Maxwell, Murray Davis, Sarah Moffatt, Ken James	April 3
Jazz at the Crest	-	Don Francks, Barbara Chilcott, Norman Symonds, Tommy Ambrose, Kathy Collier, Gregson Winkfield, Bruce Armstrong	May 3
Evelyn	George McCowan	Tom Kneebone, Diane Stapley, Pat Galloway, Tom Harvey, Jill Foster, Arlene Meadows, Joan Fowler, Jan Goldin, Anna Gilmour, Bonnie Brooks, Anne Collings, Betty Hader	May 13

== 1964–65 ==
Title	Director	Principal cast	Run
There were no plays in fall 1964. The company resumed in January 1965
A Severed Head	Henry Kaplan	Leo Ciceri, Anna Cameron, Dinah Christie, Tobi Weinberg, Fred Davis, Lee Patterson, Phyllis Malcolm Stewart	Jan. 3
The Deputy	Murray Davis	Leo Ciceri, Joseph Shaw, William Needles, Ian Burton, Patrick Boxhill, William Brydon, Michael Tabbitt, Paul Robin, Michael Snow, Ken Pauli, Ratch Wallace	Jan. 10
Oh Dad, Poor Dad, Mamma's Hung You in the Closet and I'm Feelin' So Sad	Jack Ofield	Eve Collyer, Heath Lamberts, Pat Armstrong, Bernard Behrens, Ken Pauli, Bruce Armstrong, Grant Cowan, Colin Hamilton, Leon Pownall, Gregory Reid	March 7
The Provoked Wife	Joseph Shaw	Gerard Parkes, Nonnie Griffin, Moy Fenwick, Paul Craig, Gary Files	March 24
Emmanuel Xoc	Herbert Whittaker	Jack Creley, William Brydon, Norman Welsh, Ron Hartmann, John Paris	April 18
Oh What A Lovely War	Kevin Palmer	Michael Bawtree, Eric House, Donald Sutherland, Barbara Bryne, Joel Kenyon, Gwen Thomas	May 9

== 1965–66 ==
Title	Director	Principal cast	Premiere
The Private Ear; The Public Eye	Kevin Palmer	Frances Hyland, Norman Welsh, Ken James, Heath Lamberts	Oct. 17
Tiny Alice	Murray Davis	Anna Cameron, Joseph Shaw, Peter Mews, Jay Shannon, Colin Fox	Nov. 10
Mr. Scrooge	Murray Davis, Joseph Shaw	Peter Mews, Jane Casson, Jay Shannon, Frank King, Patrick Boxhill, Ed West, Terry Young, Jennifer Morton, Keilder Glen Fraser Glen, Joyce Gordon	Nov. 28
Hay Fever	Joseph Shaw	Mary Savidge, Norman Welsh, Lynne Gorman, Colin Fox, Richard Monette	Jan. 2
The Physicists	Murray Davis	Norman Welsh, James Edmond, Douglas Marland, Vanya Franck, Jane Casson, Joyce Campion	Jan. 30
Tartuffe	Joseph Shaw	Donald Ewer, Anna Cameron, Douglas Marland, Joyce Gordon, Montgomery Davis, Shirley Knight, Paul Robin, Robert Marsh, Louis del Grande	Feb. 20
Poor Bitos	John O'Shaughnessy	Eric House, Joseph Shaw, Douglas Marland, Michael Snow, Adrian Pecknold	March 13
Hedda Gabler	Murray Davis	Marilyn Lightstone, Norman Welsh, Douglas Marland, Vanya Franck, Joyce Campion	April 24

Source: Toronto Public Library, Crest Theatre Collection, Illidge 2005
