= Playdate (Canadian TV series) =

- Genre: Drama anthology
- Presented by: Robert Goulet (1961); Christopher Plummer (1961–1962)
- Country of origin: Canada
- Original language: English
- No. of seasons: 3

Production
- Executive producer: Ed Moser
- Running time: 60 minutes

Original release
- Network: CBC Television
- Release: 4 October 1961 – 20 July 1964

Related
- General Motors Presents

Playdate is a Canadian drama anthology television series that aired on CBC Television from 1961 to 1964.

== Premise ==
The series replaced General Motors Presents. Ed Moser, a story editor from that previous series, became executive producer of Playdate. He reduced the presence of Canadian script writers, featuring nine Canadian-written scripts in the final season of Playdate compared to 19 Canadian works featured in the final season of General Motors Presents.

Robert Goulet hosted the earliest episodes of Playdate, replaced by Christopher Plummer from 20 December 1961. From October 1962, episodes of the UK series The Jo Stafford Show were occasionally broadcast, billed by the CBC as Playdate Presents.... In September 1963, similar treatment was given to The Red Skelton Show, an American series, when it was sporadically broadcast in the Playdate time slot.

The CBC cancelled Playdate and Parade by June 1964, as part of a general reduction in variety programming for the 1964–65 season. In the months following the last Playdate episode, The Red Skelton Show was regularly seen in the time slot.

In 1964, 26 episodes of Playdate were sold for broadcast in Australia.

== Episode ==
This hour-long series was broadcast over three seasons as follows (times in Eastern zone):

=== Season 1: 1961–62 ===
Broadcasts of Playdate for the first season were Wednesdays at 8:00 p.m. (Eastern time):

Title	Air Date	Cast	Writer	Producer	Notes
"Stop the World And Let Me Off"	4 October 1961	Norman Ettlinger, Ruth Springford, Powys Thomas	Jacqueline Rosenfeld	George McCowan	science fiction
"The Cell 5 Experience"	11 October 1961	James Daly, James Shigeta, Jack Creley, Don Francks	Bruce Stewart		
"Valerie"	18 October 1961	Rodney Archer, Barbara Armitage, Charmion King, Budd Knapp, Gerard Parkes	Patricia Joudry	Basil Coleman	
"In The Good Time"	25 October 1961	Percy Rodriguez, Lloyd Bochner, Ann Morrish	A. M. Kittermaster	David Gardner	
"The Prizewinner"	1 November 1961	Peter Lind Hayes	Bernard Slade		
"Heir for a Shoestring"	8 November 1961	George Tobas, Cec Linder, Nancy Mitchell, Sylvia Lennick, Suzanne Grossman	Paul Wayne	Leo Orenstein	
"Masterpiece"	15 November 1961	Powys Thomas, Mavor Moore	Larry Ward, Gordon Russell (story); Harvey Hart (adaptation)		
pre-empted for Wayne and Shuster special	22 November 1961				
"Salt of the Earth"	29 November 1961	Frances Hyland, Cec Linder, Ruth Springford	Rebecca West (story); Elizabeth Hart (adaptation)	George McGowan	
"The Exchange Teacher"	6 December 1961		M. Charles Cohen		
"Love in Another Land"	13 December 1961				
"Some Talk of Alexander"	20 December 1961				
"Private Potter"	27 December 1961				
"My Representative"	3 January 1962				
"Nightmare"	10 January 1962		Alf Harris		
"That Gold Belongs to Uncle Angus"	17 January 1962	Bill Glover, Tudi Wiggins, Drew Thompson, Ed McNamara	Leslie McFarlane		
"The Big Wheel"	24 January 1962	Eric Christmas, Bruno Gerussi, Edward Everett Cambridge	John Glennon		
"One Man to Beat"	31 January 1962	John Vernon	Fred Edge	George McGowan	hockey drama
pre-empted for Wayne and Shuster special	7 February 1962				
"Mr Nobody"	14 February 1962		Leslie Sands		
"The Troubled Heart"	21 February 1962		Arthur Hailey		
"The Square"	28 February 1962	Frances Hyland, Norman Welsh			
"The Black Bonspiel of Wullie MacCrimmon"	7 March 1962	John Drainie, Ed McNamara			Melwyn Breen, director
"The Eye Opener Man and the Wages of Zinn"	14 March 1962	Mavor Moore, Charmion King, Leo Leyden, Paul Kligman	Leslie McFarlane	Melwyn Breen	drama about the early 20th century Calgary newspaper
"After the Funeral"	21 March 1962	Neil McCallum, Gillie Fenwick, John Horton, Ruth Springford	Alun Owen		
"The Origin of the Species"	28 March 1962	Ted Follows, Larry D. Mann, Murray Westgate, Austin Willis	M. Charles Cohen		drama concerning people who survive a global disaster
"Most Beautiful Girl in the World"	4 April 1962	Kate Reid, Neil McCallum			drama concerning a beauty pageant
pre-empted for "Living With a Giant", an Intertel documentary	11 April 1962				
"Come To Me"	18 April 1962	Barbara Franklin, Robin Gammell, Janet Reid, Bill Kemp	Robert J. Crean, Peter Lind Hayes	Melwyn Breen	
"Village Wooing"	25 April 1962	William Hutt, Ann Morrish	George Bernard Shaw (story)		repeat of a 1961 broadcast
"The Thirteenth Laird"	2 May 1962	Norman Ettlinger, Joseph Shaw, Peter Donat	Munroe Scott		concerning Canadian history
"The Aspern Papers"	9 May 1962	Lloyd Bochner, Marigold Charlesworth, Cathleen Nesbitt	Henry James (story); Michael Dyne (adaptation)	Ronald Weyman	
"The Prisoner"	16 May 1962	Leo Ciceri, William Hutt			
"The Reluctant Angels"	23 May 1962	Ted Follows, Jack Creley, Jane Mallett	Bernard Slade		concerning the effects of a Broadway success on a family
"None of Us is Perfect"	30 May 1962	Larry D. Mann, Jack Creley, Paul Kligman	Brian Swarbick		concerning a bank robbery
"Hold My Hand, Soldier"	6 June 1962				
"The Gopher Colony"	13 June 1962				
"The Greatest Man in the World"	20 June 1962		James Thurber (story)		
pre-empted for documentary special, "The Pursuit of Happiness" presented by Alistair Cooke	27 June 1962				

=== Summer Playdate 1962 ===
Summer Playdate consisted of broadcasts of UK productions in a Tuesday 9:30 p.m. evening time slot between regular seasons of Playdate, from July to September 1962. Episodes were generally British mysteries.

=== Season 2: 1962–63 ===
Broadcasts were Thursdays at 9:00 p.m. (Eastern time):

Title	Air Date	Cast	Writer	Producer	Notes
"The Gimmick"	4 October 1962	Eric House, Corinne Conley, Bill Kemp, Ed McNamara, Helene Winston, Mary Alice Smith, Sammy Sales, Maxine Miller, Diane Buchan, Cynthia Kelly, Gloria Foreman, Arch McDonnell, Joe Austin, Diane Stapley	Bernard Slade	Melwyn Breen (also director)	comedy
The Jo Stafford Show	11 October 1962	Bob Hope, James Darren guests			
"The Looking Glass World"	18 October 1962	Ted Follows, Austin Willis	Donald Jack		
"The Pinedust Affair"	25 October 1962	Lloyd Bochner, Barbara Shilcott			political
"Mr. Oblomov"	1 November 1962	Douglas Rain (Oblomov), Frances Hyland (Olga), Peter Donat (Stoltz), Bernard Behrens (Zakhar)	Ivan Goncharov (story); John Coulter (adaptation)		
"The Broken Sky"	8 November 1962		Paul Almond, Rudi Dorn		World War II setting
"Question of Fact"	15 November 1962	Gladys Cooper, Paul Harding, Frances Hyland			
"My Darling, My Darling, My Life and My Bride"	22 November 1962	Peter Donat, Larry D. Mann, Claire Marshall, Alan Blye			
The Jo Stafford Show	29 November 1962	Kenneth Moore, Roy Castle guests			
"No Fixed Abode"	6 December 1962	Chris Wiggins, Jeremy Wilkin			set in an English hostel
"The Two-Faced Angel"	13 December 1962	Robert Christie, William Brydon, Dinah Christie			history of a bride's family haunts a wedding
The Jo Stafford Show	20 December 1962	Harry Secombe, Westminster Abbey Choir, George Mitchell Singers, Corona Stage Academy (guests)			Christmas special
"Rain in the Morning"	27 December 1962	Aileen Seaton, Jonathan White			concerning a magazine salesman and his wife
"The Old One"	3 January 1963	Tony Van Bridge, Ivor Barry, Gillie Fenwick	Tony Van Bridge		a retiring policeman receives a tough job
"You Can't Win 'Em All"	10 January 1963	Neil McCallum, George Sperdakos, Leo Ciceri, Michelle Balletto, Larry Zahab, Al Kozlik	Alun Owen	Paul Almond	about a wireless operator
"A Wicked, Wicked Woman"	17 January 1963	Donald Harron, Paddy Armstrong	Roger O. Hirson	Leo Orenstein	legal topic
The Jo Stafford Show	24 January 1963	Ella Fitzgerald, Claire Bloom, Kathleen Harrison, George Benson (guests)			
"The Messenger"	31 January 1963	Douglas Rain, Peter Donat, Toby Robins, Frances Hyland, Kate Reid	Jacqueline Rosenfeld		about a businessman on sensitive business in London
"Blue and White"	7 February 1963	Leo Ciceri, Robin Gammell, Claire Marshall	Kenneth Jupp	Basil Coleman	
"The Ninety-Ninth Day"	14 February 1963	Leo Ciceri, Hilary Vernon, Andrew Allan, Gillie Fenwick, Chris Wiggins	Eric Koch, Melwyn Breen		
"The Stronger"	21 February 1963	Irena Mayeska, Anna Reiser	August Strindberg		
The Long Goodbye	21 February 1963	James Beggs, Len Birman, Beth Morris	Tennessee Williams		
"The New Tenant"	21 February 1963	Drew Thompson, Diana Maddox	Eugène Ionesco		
The Jo Stafford Show	28 February 1963	guests Peggy Lee, Roy Castle			
"The Cowboy and Mr Anthony"	7 March 1963	Ian Tyson, Sylvia Fricker	Hugh Kemp	Norman Campbell	
pre-empted for Stanley Cup Hockey playoff match	11 April 1963				
pre-empted for Stanley Cup Hockey playoff match	18 April 1963				
The Jo Stafford Show	25 April 1963	Peter Lawford (guest)			chivalry theme
"The Man Who Cheered the Leafs"	2 May 1963	Austin Willis, Charmion King, Peter Kastner			about hockey; this was rescheduled due to Stanley Cup playoffs
"The Public Prosecutor"	9 May 1963	Douglas Rain, Peter Donat			set in the French Revolution
The Jo Stafford Show	16 May 1963	Rosemary Clooney, Mel Torme, Edd Byrnes (guests)			
"My Son, the Doctor"	23 May 1963				
"The Night Conspirators"	30 May 1963				
"The Hunt"	6 June 1963				
"Men Don't Make Passes"	13 June 1963				
The Jo Stafford Show	20 June 1963	Robert Morley, Stanley Holloway, Morecambe and Wise, Tiller Girls (guests)			
"The Stone Boat"	27 June 1963				
"Call Me a Liar"	4 July 1963				

=== Season 3: 1963–64 ===
Broadcast Mondays at 9:00 p.m. (Eastern time) from 30 September 1963 to 20 July 1964 as follows:

Title	Air Date	Cast	Writer	Producer	Notes
The Red Skelton Show	30 September 1963	Steve Allen, Jayne Meadows, Joanie Sommers			
"The Day the Money Stopped"	7 October 1963	Darren McGavin	Maxwell Anderson		a father's will omits his son
"Not for Every Eye"	14 October 1963	Jack Creley, Larry D. Mann, Barbara Hamilton	Gerard Bessette (story)		concerning book banning
The Red Skelton Show	21 October 1963	Jane Powell (guest)			
"With My Head Tucked Underneath My Arm"	28 October 1963		Len Peterson		based on the life of mathematician Évariste Galois
"Willow Circle"	4 November 1963	Charmion King, William Needles, Gordon Pinsent, Jill Foster			a wife in the suburbs puts her marriage at risk
pre-empted for CBC News special on the Royal Commission on Bilingualism and Biculturalism	11 November 1963				"The Queen of Spades" was rescheduled to 9 December 1963
"The Typists"	18 November 1963	Frances Hyland, Douglas Rain	Murray Schisgal		about an office relationship
pre-empted for the rebroadcast funeral of John F. Kennedy	25 November 1963				
"A Suitable Case for Treatment"	2 December 1963	John Horton, Michael Learned, Henry Ramer	David Mercer		a recently divorced man seeks psychiatric help
"The Queen of Spades"	9 December 1963	John Colicos (as Ernst Herman), Hilary Vernon (as Countess Anna), Patricia Collins (Lisa), Dermot Grice	Alexander Pushkin (story)		pre-empted from 11 November 1963
The Red Skelton Show	16 December 1963	Joanie Summers, Jackie Coogan (guests)			
"The Critic"	23 December 1963	John Colicos, Eric House, Jack Creley, Marigold Charlesworth	Richard Brinsley Sheridan		
"The Fight for Martin Wheeler"	30 December 1963	Frank Overton, Charmion King, Peter Kastner, Henry Comor	Howard Rodman		a psychologist is unable to treat a boy
The Red Skelton Show	6 January 1964	guests George Gobel, James Munshin, Vi Velasco			
"The Man Who Could Find Things"	13 January 1964	Peter Donat, Patricia Collins, Ivor Barry, Michael Learned	Paul Lee		mystery
The Red Skelton Show	20 January 1964	guest Merv Griffin			
"The Lover"	27 January 1964	Corinne Conley, Jack Creley	Harold Pinter		
"Pastures of Plenty"	3 February 1964	Kate Reid, Bruno Gerussi			conflict on a southern Ontario tobacco farm
The Red Skelton Show	10 February 1964	Douglas Fairbanks, Jr.			sketch: "Lives of a Bungle Lancer"
"No Sand for the Ostrich"	17 February 1964		Enid Abrahams, Helen French		a rich couple learn their grandson is partially black
Laburnum Grove	24 February 1964	Murray Matheson, Hilary Vernon, Gillie Fenwick, Norman Ettinger	J. B. Priestley		comedy of a suburban criminal
"Man With a Rope"	2 March 1964	Jack Creley, Robert Seaton, Aileen Seaton			
"From Paradise Direct"	9 March 1964	Jackie Mason, Deborah Turnbull, Sean Mulcahy, Maureen Fitzgerald, Drew Thompson, Leo Leyder			
The Red Skelton Show	16 March 1964	guests Mickey Rooney ("I was an S.A.P. for the F.B.I. sketch), Jo Stafford (singing)			
"Dear Liar"	23 March 1964	Barry Morse, Zoe Caldwell	Jerome Kilty		letters are exchanged between George Bernard Shaw (Morse) and Mrs Patrick Campbell (Caldwell); David Gardner directed; repeated 13 July 1964
"The Sponge Room"	30 March 1964	Heather Sears, Neil McCallum			comedy set in strange locations about a pair of lovers
The Red Skelton Show	6 April 1964	guest Connie Stevens			
"Alias Jones"	13 April 1964	Ivor Barry, Earle Hyman, Douglas Rain	Jacquline Rosefield		
pre-empted for Document current affairs special	20 April 1964				
"Step Out of Darkness"	27 April 1964	Zoe Caldwell, Barry Morse	Jean-Paul Filion		originally broadcast on Radio-Canada
The Red Skelton Show	4 May 1964	guests Mickey Rooney, Jackie Coogan, The Snobs (UK teen band)			
"The Front Room"	11 May 1964	Betty Leighton, Gillie Fenwick, Tony Van Bridge, Diana Maddox	Robert Storey		a woman's marriage is threatened by her obsession with house chores
"Grubstake for the Eyeopener Man"	18 May 1964	Mavor Moore	Leslie McFarlane		about a Calgary newspaper
"The Stag"	25 May 1964	Neil McCallum, John Horton, Ruth Springford			a man in New York returns to his native Wales for his brother's wedding
"Image of Renault"	1 June 1964	Norma Renault, Alfie Scopp			two loners assist each other in the search for love
The Red Skelton Show	8 June 1964				
"Pilgrim, Why Do You Come?"	15 June 1964	Barry Jones, Corinne Conley, John Horton	Leslie McFarlane		each year, an actor attends the Shakespeare Festival
"The One Day of the Year"	22 June 1964	Neil McCallum, Rex Sevenoaks, Adrian Pecknold, Gertrude Bradley	Alan Seymour		set in Anzac Day|
"A Night Out"	29 June 1964	Jeremy Wilkin, Elizabeth Cole, Zoe Caldwell, Norman Welsh	Harold Pinter	Basil Coleman	
The Red Skelton Show	6 July 1964	guests Raymond Burr, The Beach Boys			
"Dear Liar"	13 July 1964	Barry Morse, Zoe Caldwell	Jerome Kilty		rebroadcast of 23 March 1964
"The Royal Game"	20 July 1964	Barry Morse, Larry D. Mann, Robert Christie, Ivor Barry	Stefan Zweig		last episode of Playdate; a cruise ship's chess game

== Bibliography ==
- Rutherford, Paul (1990). When Television Was Young: Primetime Canada 1952–1967. University of Toronto Press. ISBN 0-8020-5830-2.
