= Crest Theatre (disambiguation) =

Crest Theatre is a historic theatre in Sacramento, California, US.

Crest Theatre may also refer to:

- Crest Theatre, cinema and live theatre venue in Toronto, Ontario, Canada, now known as the Regent Theatre
- Crest Theatre Foundation, live theatre company operating at the Crest in the 1950s and 1960s
- Crest Theatre, Granville, historic theatre in Granville, Australia
- Crest Theatre at Old School Square, theatre in Old School Square in Delroy Beach, Florida, US
- Majestic Crest Theatre, historic theatre in Los Angeles, California, US (now known as the Nimoy Theatre)
