= The Glass Cage (play) =

English play

- Original language: English
- Written by: J.B. Priestley
- Genre: Drama
- Setting: Toronto, early 1900s

Premiere
- Date: 5 March 1957
- Place: Crest Theatre, Toronto

The Glass Cage is a 1957 play by J.B. Priestley.

It premiered at the Crest Theatre in Toronto, Ontario, Canada before transferring to London's West End where it ran for 35 performances at the Piccadilly Theatre. The cast included Donald Davis and his brother and sister Murray Davis and Barbara Chilcott, for whom it had specially been written.

== Bibliography ==
- Wearing, J.P. The London Stage 1950-1959: A Calendar of Productions, Performers, and Personnel. Rowman & Littlefield, 2014.
