= Betty Leighton =

English-Canadian actress

- Born: July 8, 1920; London, England
- Died: May 10, 2005 (aged 84)
- Occupation: actor

Betty Leighton (July 8, 1920 – May 10, 2005) was an English-born Canadian stage actor. Leighton was in the inaugural productions at Stratford Festival in Stratford, Canada and the Crest Theatre in Toronto. She also was one of the first actors in the Shaw Festival. Starting her career in Ottawa, Ontario, Canada in 1940s, Leighton took roles across Canada and the United States, including New York's Broadway. She was a pioneer in the Canadian stage scene and was devoted to Canadian drama, even after she moved to the United States.

== Early life and career beginnings ==
Leighton was born in London, England in 1920. She immigrated to Ottawa, Ontario, Canada in 1942 to join her electronic engineer husband Geoffrey Leighton who was on loan from the Royal Air Force to the Royal Canadian Air Force during World War II. After World War II ended, the couple decided to stay in Ottawa. Friends suggested to Betty, a lifetime theatre-goer, to try out for a part in an amateur theatre production.

Leighton first performed with the Ottawa Little Theatre (OLT) community theatre, acting in six OLT productions beginning in 1946. Her first appearance was in Mr. and Mrs. North by Owen Davis, Snafu by Louis Solomon and Harold Buchman, Overlaid: The Chameleon, as Elvira, the ghost wife in Blithe Spirit. In 1947, Leighton starred as the Fairy Queen in their production of The Crystal Garden. Her last appearance with OLT was in February 1948 in The Cherry Orchard by Anton Chekhov adapted into English by Michael Frayn.

== Professional career ==
In July 1948, Leighton began working with Ottawa Stage Society (OSS) under the artistic direction of Malcolm Morley, and later, Amelia Hall. That month she performed in the Stage Society production of While the Sun Shines (play) by Terence Rattigan. This was followed in September 1948 in a production of The Rivals with Christopher Plummer; in October 1948 in productions of The Hasty Heart and French Without Tears; in November 1948 in Double Door and in Busman's Honeymoon as Miss Twitterton; in December 1948 as Penelope Toop in See How They Run and Kitty Verdun in Charley's Aunt; in April 1949 in The Passing of the Third Floor Back; in May 1949 in Noël Coward's Design for Living as Gilda, and as Catherine Winslow in The Winslow Boy; and in August 1949 in Society productions of J.B. Priestley's The Linden Tree and Daphne du Maurier's Rebecca, all with Plummer. Leighton also appeared in the OSS productions of J. B. Priestley's Dangerous Corner in March 1949 and Noël Coward's Hay Fever in June 1949. All Stage Society productions were mounted at the historic La Salle Academy's auditorium on Sussex Drive. The Academy was a Catholic school and all plays were vetted by the priests. Plummer recalls this period of fondness with a dedicated audience.

In 1949, Leighton was one of the founders of the new Ottawa-based Canadian Repertory Theatre (CRT) company that succeeded the OSS. Leighton performed with the CRT from 1949 to 1952, a period of 500 consecutive performances. At its founding, the CRT was the only professional stock company in Canada. According to fellow actor Amelia Hall, who also performed at CRT, it was an exciting period for young Canadian actors with many opportunities to play varied roles, although the pay was as low as $28 per week. In October 1949, Leighton was Jane Banbury in Noël Coward's Fallen Angels; in November 1949, Leighton starred as Eliza Doolittle in Shaw's Pygmalion,; in January 1950 as Barbara in Shaw's Major Barbara; and Auntie in The Servant In The House also starring Plummer in April 1950.

In 1951, the Leightons moved to Oakville, Ontario. Betty continued in roles on the stage, radio and television. She appeared in summer stock and stage roles in Peterborough, Ontario, Knowlton, Quebec, Kingston, Ontario and a three-month engagement in Bermuda in the play Born Yesterday. She acted in radio for the Ford Theatre and on television in The Moonstone in Toronto.

Her performance in Chekhov's Three Sisters with the CRT attracted the attention of director and playwright Tyrone Guthrie who then cast her as Queen Elizabeth in Stratford's Richard III in 1953, its inaugural production, and All's Well That Ends Well. Later in 1953, Leighton returned to the CRT for a three-week engagement in Skylark starring William Shatner during its run at the La Salle Academy. Leighton returned to Ottawa in later 1968, her first performance in Ottawa in 15 years to perform in the Town Theatre production of Lion in Winter, portraying Eleanor of Aquitane opposite Leo Ciceri as Henry II.

Leighton was a regular performer at Toronto's Crest Theatre, appearing in 23 productions from 1954 to 1960.. She appeared in eight productions in its inaugural season in 1954 alone, including its inaugural production of Richard of Bordeaux. Leighton played Lady Tasty in the premiere of Guthries' new play Haste to the Wedding. She also appeared at Toronto's Hart House Theatre during this period.

In the summers of 1956 and 1957, Leighton performed at Montreal's Mountain Playhouse on Mount Royal. In 1956, Leighton starred in a production of Dear Charles. In 1957, she returned in a production of Noël Coward's Design for Living, a familiar play for her, having played it in Ottawa. This was followed by an appearance in October 1957 in a production of The Reluctant Debutante at the Montreal Studio and Drama Club.

In 1960, Betty and Geoffrey and their four-year-old daughter Armanda (named after a favourite role from Noël Coward's Private Lives) moved to Trenton, New Jersey after Geoffrey joined Princeton University's faculty. Betty had recently completed a performance with the Crest production of Epitaph for George Dillon, her final appearance at the Crest.

Betty continued to act, with an agreement with her family to stay away from home for no longer than six weeks. A Broadway role followed, in the play One Way Pendulum. Another Broadway appearance came in a production of Cyrano with Christopher Plummer.

In 1963, Leighton appeared in the Vancouver International Festival production of Florodora. Directed by Mavor Moore, Leighton got good reviews as Dolores, the fortune-hunting widow, although the play was panned by The Toronto Star's drama critic Nathan Cohen.

In 1964, Leighton joined the cast of the Shaw Festival production of Heartbreak House as Lady Utterword. This was the inaugural production in the first season that the Shaw used professional (aka Equity) actors. In 1966, she appeared in The Apple Cart directed by Edward Gilbert. This was Shaw Festival's first season under the direction of Barry Morse whom Leighton had worked with at the Crest.

In 1967, Leighton appeared at Toronto's Colonnade Theatre in a production of Entertaining Mr. Sloane and at the Shaw in Arms and the Man

In 1968, Leighton appeared in Calgary, Alberta in a MAC 14 production of the black comedy The Killing of Sister George as Mercy Croft. In 1970, Leighton returned to Calgary to act at Theatre Calgary in two productions. She played the comical Lady Bracknell in Oscar Wilde's The Importance of Being Earnest and the tragic Mary Tyrone in Eugene O'Neill's Long Day's Journey into Night.

In 1970, Leighton returned to summer stock at the Red Barn Theatre in Jackson's Point, Ontario, starring in Black Comedy, The Happy Hypochondriac and Barefoot in the Park. By then, the Leightons were living in Lewiston, New York and Leighton took the time from her family to appear at the Red Barn to prove she could still do the "show-a-week" trick.

In 1971, Leighton performed in three plays in Minneapolis, Minnesota with director Michael Langham, whom she had worked with at the Crest. In Minneapolis, Langham directed a new production of Cyrano and Leighton joined its production as well. Cyrano was taken to Broadway, where its production was troubled, with clashes between Langham and Christopher Plummer, leading to Langham leaving the production, and its run cut short.

In 1972, Leighton returned to the Shaw to star in their production of Misalliance under the direction of Paxton Whitehead.

In 1974, Leighton returned to Toronto to perform in Trelawney of the Wells, The Good Woman of Setzuan and Colour the Flesh the Colour of Dust at St. Lawrence Centre for the Arts. Trelawney later went on tour to Winnipeg's Manitoba Theatre Centre and Ottawa's National Arts Centre. Leighton had previously performed Mrs. Mossop in Trelawney in a CBC Television production. She returned the following year to the St. Lawrence in the Theatre Plus' production of Children by A. R. Gurney, Jr. based on the short story by John Cheever, as Mother.

Leighton appeared at Shaw in 1978 as an emergency replacement for Kate Reid in the production of John Gabriel Borkman and as Lady Undershaft in Major Barbara. Leighton returned to the Shaw in 1979 in Blithe Spirit, this time playing the medium Madame Arcati. She had previously played Elvira in an Ottawa production. That season, she also performed in The Corn is Green with Tony van Bridge.

Leighton continued working into her 60s. In 1981, Leighton played Ethel Thayer in a Theatre Plus production at the St. Lawrence Centre of On Golden Pond, opposite Donald Davis, whom she had worked with at the Crest. In 1982, Leighton reprised the role in a production by Atlanta, Georgia's Alliance Theatre in Cedartown, Georgia and Jekyll Island, Georgia. Also in 1981, Leighton starred in the Toronto Workshop Productions' production of A Place on Earth, based on the true story of journalist Betty Jane Wylie's experiencing poverty and having been raped.

In November 1982, Leighton appeared with Jose Ferrer at Miami's Coconut Grove Playhouse in the Players State Theatre production of The Dresser by Ronald Harwood. In 1983 and 1984, Leighton appeared in the Anniston Shakespearean Festival, in Shaw's Arms and the Man in 1983 and She Stoops to Conquer and Macbeth in 1984, "displaying her versatility". In 1985, Leighton was "wonderful to watch" in the London, Ontario Grand Theatre production of Jean Anouilh's Ring Round the Moon, directed by Derek Goldby.
