= Hart House Theatre =

Performing arts theatre in Toronto, Ontario, Canada

Coordinates: 43.6637°N 79.3945°W

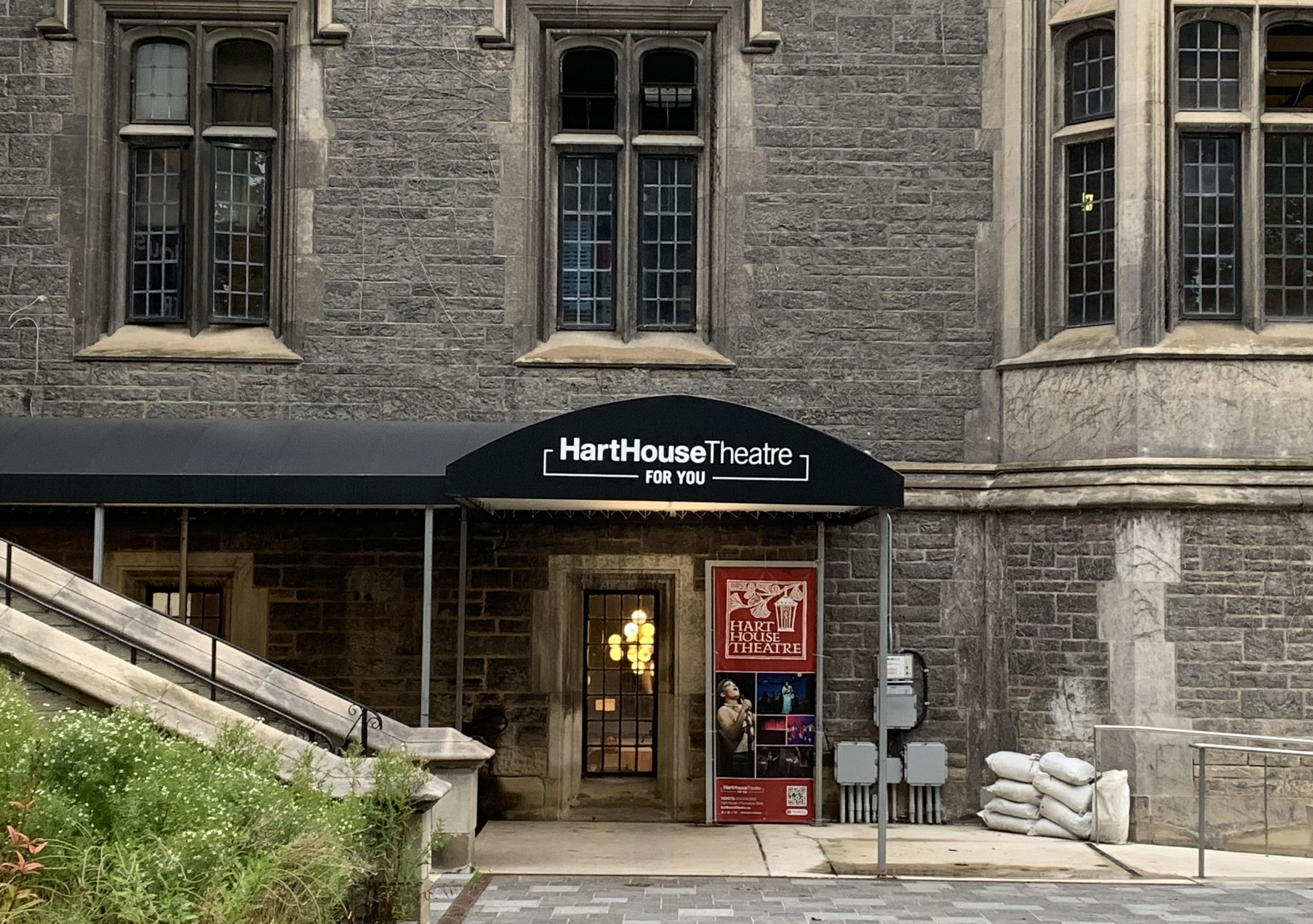
- The Hart House Theatre in September 2024
- Interactive map of Hart House Theatre
- Address: 7 Hart House Circle; Toronto, Ontario; Canada
- Owner: University of Toronto
- Capacity: 428

Construction
- Opened: November 11, 1919; 106 years ago
- Architects: Sproat and Rolph

Website
- harthousetheatre.ca

Hart House Theatre is a 428-seat theatre in Toronto, Ontario, located on the University of Toronto's St. George campus in Hart House. The theatre serves the university and the Toronto community at large.

Hart House Theatre opened in November 1919. The Theatre was not in the original construction plans for the building. Construction was financed by the Massey Foundation and was supervised by Vincent Massey and his wife Alice. Massey and his brother Raymond Massey would act and direct in the theatre. The theatre's architects were Sproat and Rolph of Toronto.

The first artistic director was Roy Mitchell, who was there for two seasons before resigning over disagreements with the Board of Syndics. Healey Willan was music director from 1919 to 1925.

Before World War II, the Theatre's activities were dominated by accomplished and aspiring actors. Actors included Andrew Allan, Judith Evelyn, Kirby Hawkes, H. E. Hitchman, Ivor Lewis, Jane Mallett, Raymond Massey, Florence McGee, Lorna McLean, George Patton, Rauff Acklom, Randolph Crowe, Freddie Mallet, Agnes Muldrew, Frank Peddie, Alfred Rostance, Grace Webster and Elaine Wodson. Students also took part, including Lloyd Bochner. Group of Seven members Lawren Harris, A. Y. Jackson, Arthur Lismer and J. E. H. MacDonald painted sets in the 1920s.

In 1946, control of Hart House Theatre was transferred to the University of Toronto. Student activity, although extra-curricular, was encouraged. Robert Gill was appointed artistic director. Gill exposed the students to classic and contemporary works. His first production, Shaw's Saint Joan starring Charmion King drew headlines. Students in Gill productions, such as Anna Cameron, Donald Davis, Murray Davis, David Gardner, Jack Gray, Don Harron, Eric House, William Hutt, Bea Leonard, Araby Lockhart, George McCowan, Kate Reid and Donald Sutherland all went on to professional careers. Gill was also the artistic director of the Woodstock, New York summer stock and the Hart House actors would work there. Donald and Murray Davis would go on to found their own summer troupe, the Straw Hat Players in Muskoka and the Crest Theatre in Toronto. Gill would be the theatre's director until 1965.

In 1966, Hart House was merged into the new Graduate Centre for the Study of Drama. It was now open to major productions under directors such as David Gardner, William Hutt, Leon Major, Desmond Scott and Herbert Whittaker. Major was director of productions from 1968 until 1970, when he became artistic director of the St. Lawrence Centre for the Arts.

In 1986, Hart House Theatre became independent of the Graduate Centre and became available for student, community and professional productions.
