= Ottawa Little Theatre =

Community theater in Ontario, Canada

Coordinates: 45.428211°N 75.685807°W

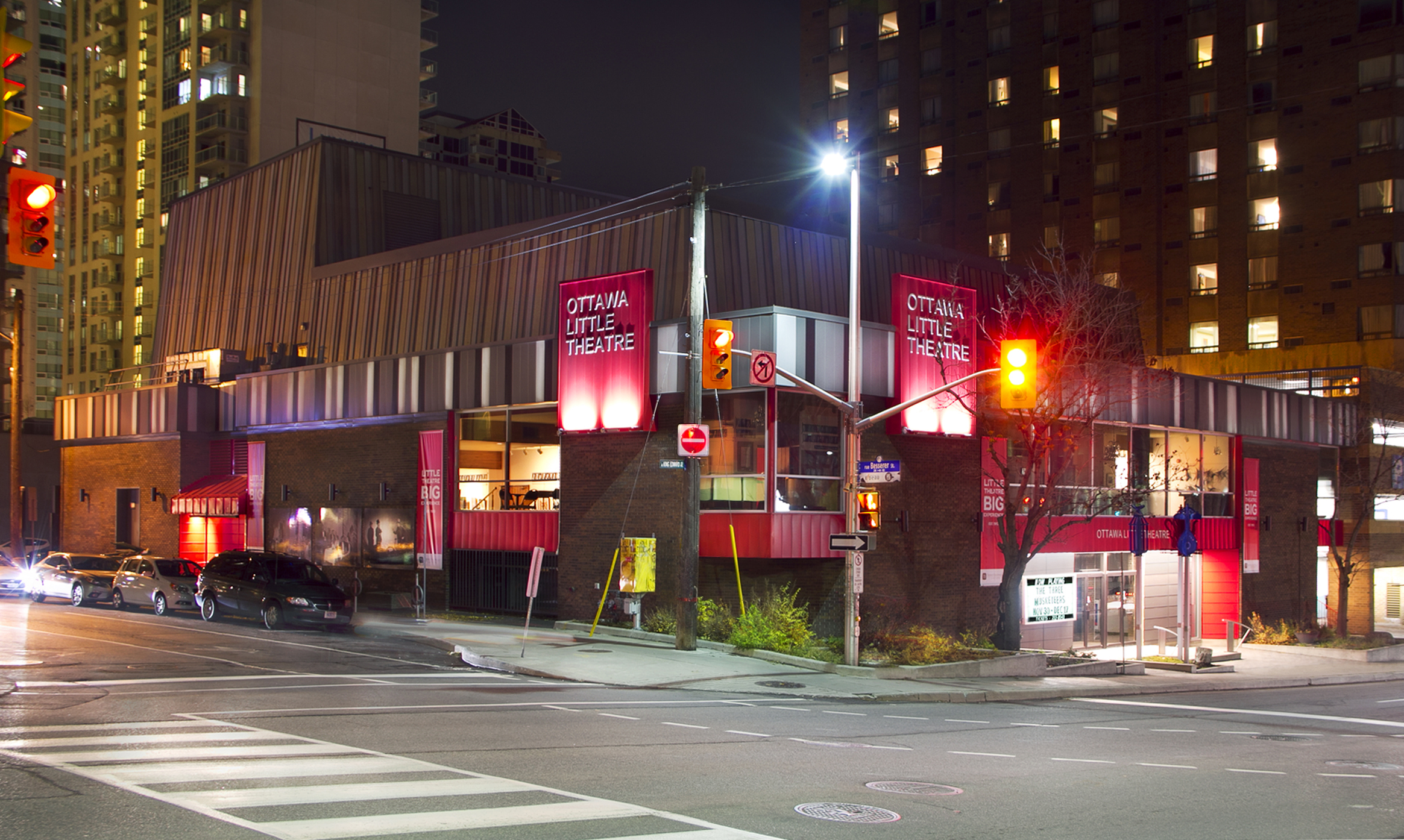
- Interactive map of Ottawa Little Theatre
- Address: 400 King Edward Ave. Ottawa, Ontario; Canada
- Capacity: 382
- Designation: Community theatre

Construction
- Opened: 1913
- Reopened: 1928 (in current location)
- Rebuilt: 1970 following fire
- Years active: 1913 to present
- Architect: W.E. Fancott

Website
- www.ottawalittletheatre.com

The Ottawa Little Theatre, originally called the Ottawa Drama League at its inception in 1913, is the longest continuously running community theatre in Canada, and one of the oldest in North America. Based in Canada's capital city, it owns its own 382-seat theatre where it presents three-week runs of nine plays per season from late February to December.

In 1970, when the Little Theatre (originally a church that had been renovated in 1928) was completely destroyed by fire, the OLT built and opened a new theatre on the same site within two years, and retired the debt within five years. The OLT's income is generated almost entirely from ticket sales and donations. All of its directors, actors, designers and stage crew are volunteers.

A number of Canadian actors have performed on the OLT stage, including Amelia Hall, Saul Rubinek, Betty Leighton, Rich Little, Robert MacNeil, Dan Aykroyd, Adam Beach, Luba Goy and Raoul Bhaneja. Famed photographer Yousuf Karsh also has a rich history with the Ottawa Little Theatre developing his lighting techniques while photographing multiple productions in the 1930s. It was there that he met his first wife, Solange. The theatre has several original photographs of Karsh on display.

The Dominion Drama Festival, founded in 1933, took place at the Little Theatre for its first five years.

In 1937, the theatre launched a National One-Act Playwriting Competition which continues to this day. Winners have included Robertson Davies, John Murrell, Erika Ritter, Catherine Banks and Ken Mitchell.

The Ottawa Little Theatre's website includes a searchable database of past productions with cast and crew members as well as photographs from the more than 1,000 plays that have been performed throughout its history.

== Gallery ==
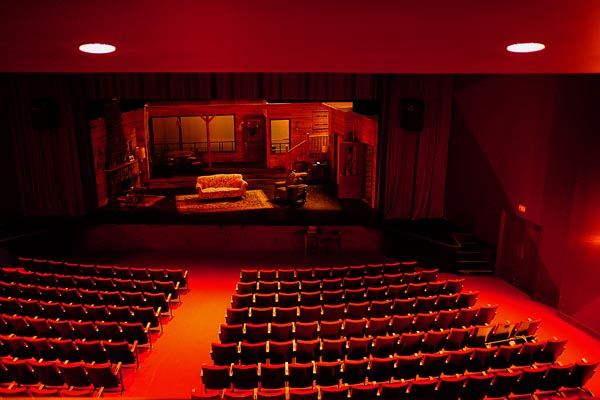
The auditorium from the sound booth

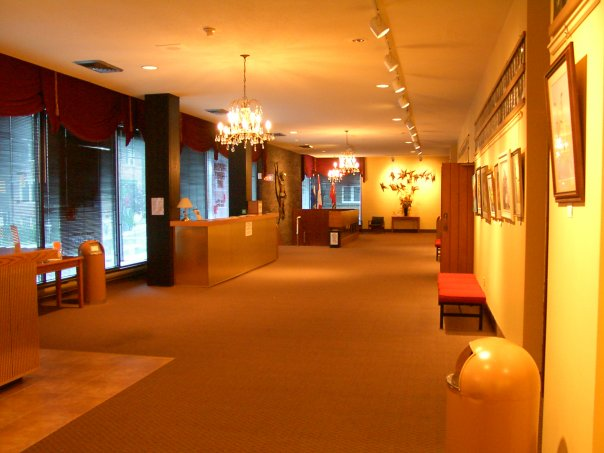
The lobby

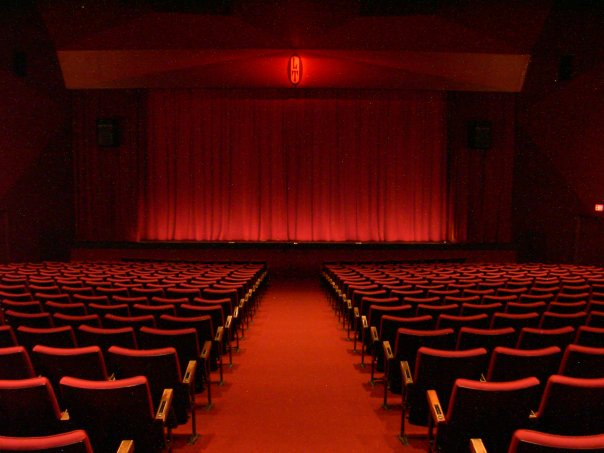
The auditorium
