= Drew Thompson =

Canadian actor & director (1922–1992)

Andrew Ruthven Stovin Thompson, known professionally as Drew Thompson, (March 9, 1922 – September 8, 1992) was a Canadian actor and director who worked in theatre and television. With Arthur Sullivan he co-founded the International Players theatre troupe in Kingston, Ontario in 1948, one of the earliest professional regional theatre organizations in Canada. He co-led this organization with Sullivan until Sullivan's death in 1953, and remained the sole director of the organization until is dissolved in 1956. He thereafter worked primarily as an actor out of Toronto. His television work included the recurring role of Mendel Mantelpiece Mason on Howdy Doody in the 1950s. He made one appearance on Broadway as Philippe Ploquin in The Heavenly Twins at the Booth Theatre in 1955.

== Life and career ==
Andrew "Drew" Ruthven Stovin Thompson was the son of Mr. and Mrs. Walter Thompson. A native of Ottawa, Ontario, he was educated at Trinity College, Toronto where he graduated with a Bachelor of Arts degree in June 1946. While studying drama at Trinity he starred in a school production of Noël Coward's Family Album (1946).

After graduation Thompson became a member of the Everyman Players with whom he toured to 71 cities in Western Canada giving a total of a 120 performances in the 1946-1947 season. In 1947 he became a member of the New Play Society in Toronto with whom he performed several roles at the Royal Ontario Museum Theatre; among them Jack Chesney in Brandon Thomas's Charley's Aunt (1947), David Wylie in J. M. Barrie's What Every Woman Knows (1947), and Reverend Alexander Mill in George Bernard Shaw's Candida (1948).

With Arthur Sullivan, Thompson co-founded the influential International Players (IP) theatre troupe in Kingston, Ontario in 1948 at the time when there was very little professional theatre in Canada. He co-directed the organization with Sullivan until Sullivan's death in 1953 when he became the organization's sole director. He continued to lead the organization until 1956 when it gave its final season of performances. He also worked as a leading comedian with the IP. He performed in many plays with this organization; among them George Kelly's The Fatal Weakness (1949) James Thurber's The Male Animal (1949), and F. Hugh Herbert's The Moon Is Blue (1954).

In 1954 Thompson appeared on the Canadian Broadcasting Corporation play anthology television series Playbill in the episode The Lady from Normandy by writer Herbert Todd Cobey. He had the recurring role of Mendel Mantelpiece Mason on Howdy Doody in the 1950s. In 1960 he appeared in the CBC tele-play The Remarkable Incident at Carson's Corners. He made numerous appearances on the anthology program Festival during the 1960s. In 1962 he appeared in the episode "That Gold Belongs to Uncle Angus" in the anthology series Playdate. He played a nitwitted mounty in the 1971 CBC television farce Operation Chicken. He portrayed Parker the Butler in a filmed production of Dion Boucicault's 1855 play Used Up which was broadcast in 1973 on the anthology television series Purple Playhouse.

In 1955 Thompson made his Broadway debut as Philippe Ploquin in The Heavenly Twins at the Booth Theatre; a work he performed earlier that year at the National Theatre in Washington, D.C. He performed in many plays with the Crest Theatre Foundation in Toronto; among them Escapade (1954), Dream Girl (1954), The Ottawa Man (1958), The Madwoman of Chaillot (1961), Simon Says Get Married (1961) and Roar Like a Dove (1962).

Thompson died on September 8, 1992 at Riverdale Hospital in Toronto, Canada.
