= Araby Lockhart =

Canadian actress (born 1926)

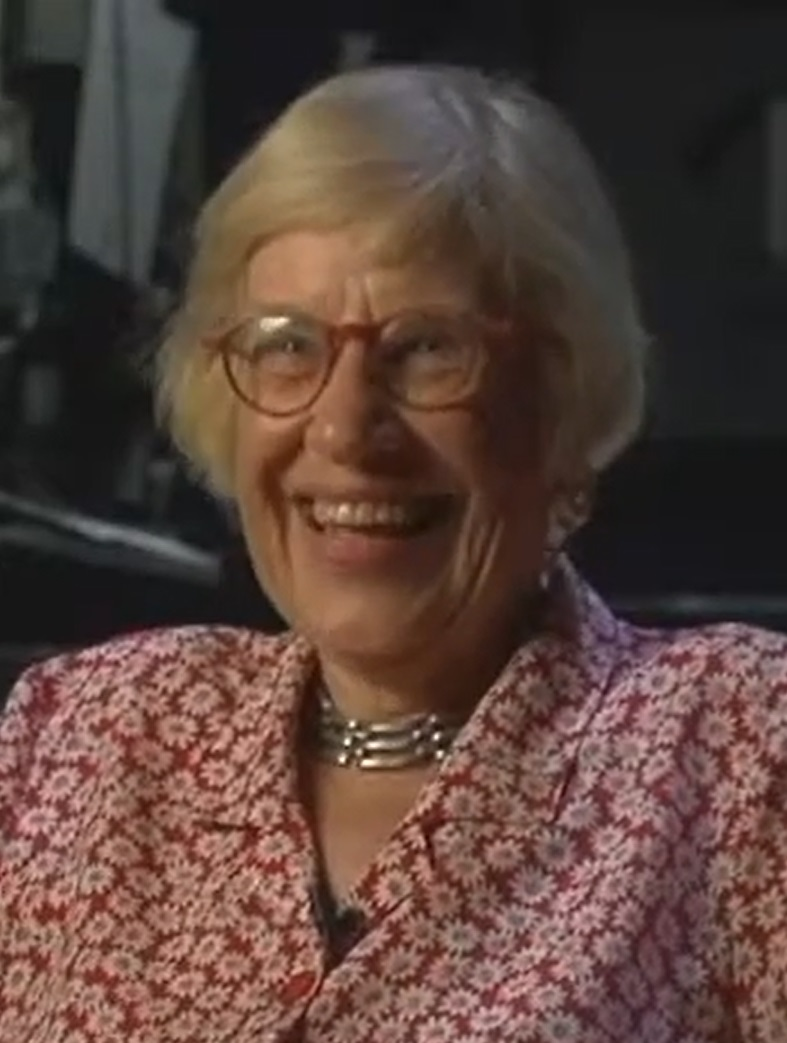
- Lockhart in 2011
- Born: December 4, 1926 (age 99); Toronto, Ontario, Canada
- Occupation: Actor
- Spouse: John Gray

Araby Lockhart (born December 4, 1926) is a Canadian stage and television actress, best known for her performances in the films Capote and Police Academy and her stage performances as a member of Hart House Theatre and the Straw Hat Players. Lockhart has also served as President of the Actors' Fund of Canada.

== Biography ==
Lockhart became interested in acting as a teenager and attended the University of Toronto in 1947, where she acted at Hart House Theatre under artistic director Robert Gill. She also accompanied Gill to act in summer stock theatre in Woodstock, New York. In the summer of 1948, Gill's students Murray and Donald Davis founded the Straw Hat Players repertory theatre company at their summer home in Port Carling, Muskoka; Lockhart was a member of the company and acted in the company's first production of the melodrama The Drunkard, along with classmates Charmion King, Ted Follows, and Eric House. While at Hart House, she met John Gray, an aspiring writer and actor, and they married in 1952.

Lockhart also toured Canada with the show Spare Rib, showcasing the history of Canada as told and performed by women, in 1955 and served as a member of the Stratford Festival company. In 1956, Lockhart appeared in two Crest Theatre productions: The School for Scandal and The Women.

In 1960, Lockhart, Gray and their three children, John, Nicholas, and Rebecca, moved to London to find work in the vital West End theatre scene. Lockhart produced and performed in the Canadian satirical revue Clap Hands, co-written by Gray, at the Prince Charles Theatre and the Lyric Hammersmith, along with Peter Mews, and Eric House. While in London, the couple had two more children, Susannah and Felix.

Gray and Lockhart divorced in 1983.

== Film and television performances ==
Year	Title	Role	Notes
1952	Tales of Adventure		Episode: "The Moonstone - Part 1"
1956	The Wayne and Shuster Hour		Episode: "Why Can't the Indians Be the Good Guys"
1956	Woman Alone		Short
1957	First Performance		Episode: "Cousin Elva"
1956-1958	On Camera	Mrs. Parker	Series: "Billy's Burglar"
1958	Anne of Green Gables	Mrs. Bell	
1952-1960	Encounter	Mrs Knowles/Janet Kane/Petra	Episodes: "Ordeal by Poison", "The Death Around Us", "An Enemy of the People"
1960	The Unforeseen		Episode: "The New Member"
1964	ITV Play of the Week	Bessie	Episode: "The Rose Tattoo"
1964	Story Parade	Mlle. Garneau	Episode: "Not For Every Eye"
1965	The Airbase	Helen Arkwright	3 episodes
1965	The Wednesday Play	Mary Danziger/Lady Harriet Fountain	Episodes: "The Pistol" and "And Did Those Feet?"
1967	Danger Island	Mrs. Ridout	5 episodes
1969	The Saint	American Lady	Episode: "The Ex-King of Diamonds"
1969	McQueen		Episode: "Vanity, Vanity"
1972	Norman Corwin Presents		Episode: "The One-Man Group"
1982	Little Gloria... Happy at Last		
1984	Police Academy	Mrs. Lassard	
1986	Check It Out!	Nurse Erngold	Episode: "Store Wars"
1986	Whodunit?	Garbage Lady	
1986	Adderly		Episode: "The Dancing Lesson"
1987	Anne of Avonlea	Gossip at ball	Uncredited
1988	Friday's Curse	Elder Florence	Episode: "The Quilt of Hathor"
1989	Alfred Hitchcock Presents	Mrs. Pickett	Episode: "Diamonds Aren't Forever"
1989	Looking for Miracles	Chief's Secretary	
1991	Dracula: The Series	Miss Ringhoff	Episode: "Sophie, Queen of the Night"
1992	Maniac Mansion	Dolly	Episode: "Misery Loves Company"
1992	Forever Knight	Alice	Episode: "Hunters"
1994	Avonlea	Mrs. Millings	Episode: "Someone to Believe In"
1998	Real Kids, Real Adventures	Granny	Episode: "Rescue in the Tetons"
2000	Psi Factor	Mary Nelson	Episode: "Chiaroscuro"
2000	The Wonderful World of Disney	Operator #1	Episode: "Mail to the Chief"
2002	Franklin's Magic Christmas	Mrs. Collie	
2002	Salem Witch Trials	Goodwife Hawley	
2003	The Blobheads	Garage Sail Lady	Episode: "The Emperor's Garage Sale"
2005	This Is Wonderland		Episode 2.4
2005	Capote	Dorothy Sanderson	
2006	Absolution	Eunice Manning	
2007	Still Small Voices	Older Woman	
2007	The Gathering	Elderly Woman	
2008	Rent-a-Goalie		Episode: "Upstairs"
2008-9	The Jon Dore Television Show	Ms. Adelaide St. Vincent / Old Lady at Fight	2 episodes
2009	The Ron James Show		Episode: 1.7
2011	Single White Spenny	Photo Lady 1	Episode: "Circumcision"
