= Toby Robins =

Canadian actress (1931–1986)

- Born: March 13, 1931; Toronto, Ontario, Canada
- Died: March 21, 1986 (aged 55); London, England, UK
- Occupation: Actress
- Years active: 1950–1984

Toby Robins (March 13, 1931 – March 21, 1986) was a Canadian actress of film, stage, and television.

== Biography ==
=== Career ===
Robins starred in hundreds of radio and stage productions in Canada from the late 1940s through the 1960s, working with such performers as Jane Mallett, Barry Morse, John Drainie, Ruth Springford, and James Doohan, among others. She appeared in a number of television and film roles beginning in the mid-1950s, and hosted the first-ever CBC Television series, The Big Revue, in 1952. In Toronto, she played in repertory with Lorne Greene, Mavor Moore, and Don Harron. At the Crest Theatre in Toronto, she played the leading parts in Cat on a Hot Tin Roof, Dream Girl, and many others.

Robins became a popular television personality as an original member of the cast of the long-running CBC television series Front Page Challenge in 1957, remaining with the program until 1961. Originally hosted by Alex Barris and later Fred Davis, Front Page Challenge was a current events series disguised as a panel-style game show in a similar format to the American What's My Line?. Panellists had to guess the news story or person behind a news story by asking questions of the guest; after the game portion, the guest was then interviewed informally by the panel.

Although Robins was initially criticized for asking simple and sometimes unintelligent questions, she soon found her journalistic sea legs, and before long was holding her own alongside the more experienced journalists, including her co-panellists Gordon Sinclair and Pierre Berton. She left the series in a salary dispute in 1961 and was replaced by future senator Betty Kennedy (who remained with the show until its demise in the 1990s). Robins returned to the show from time to time as a guest panellist.

In 1964, Robins relocated to London, and she appeared in a number of film and television productions, such as The Saint ("When Spring Is Sprung") and Space: 1999 (the two-parter "The Bringers of Wonder", which was later re-issued as the television film Destination Moonbase Alpha).

In 1968 she appeared in the first filmed episode of the classic spy-fi series Department S playing a scheming villain in The Man in the Elegant Room.

In 1981, Robins played Melina Havelock's ill-fated mother in the James Bond film For Your Eyes Only (1981). She appeared in an episode of Minder entitled "The Willesden Suite", broadcast in February 1984.

On London's West End stage, Robins appeared in such dramas as The Relapse, The Latent Heterosexual, The Flip Side, and The Aspern Papers.

=== Death ===
On 21 March 1986, Toby Robins died from breast cancer.

In 1991, her family founded the Breast Cancer Now Toby Robins Centre at The Institute of Cancer Research, in London, which was opened in 1999 by HRH The Prince of Wales, with the aim of producing a coordinated program of research to tackle breast cancer. It is the first dedicated breast cancer research centre in the United Kingdom, and directly linked to one of the most renowned cancer facilities in the world, the Royal Marsden Hospital.

== Filmography ==
Year	Title	Role	Notes
1950	Parking on This Side	The Girl	
1952	The Big Revue	Co-host	
1965	Game for Three Losers	Frances Challinor	
1967	The Naked Runner	Ruth	
1968	Department S	Selina Trenton	Episode: “The Man In The Elegant Room”
1971	The Mind of Mr. J.G. Reeder	Sadie	Episode: "The Duke"
1971	Friends	Mrs. Gardner	
1972	The Protectors	Madame Rue	Episode: "Ceremony for the Dead"
1974	Paul and Michelle	Jane	
1976	Spy Story	Helen Schlegel	
1979	Space: 1999	Diana Morris	Two-part Episode: "The Bringers of Wonder, Part One" & "The Bringers of Wonder, Part Two"
1979	Hazell	Jean Curzon	Episode: "Hazell Gets the Part"
1979	Licensed to Love and Kill	Scarlet Star	
1981	For Your Eyes Only	Iona Havelock	
1983	Princess Daisy	Eleanour Kavanaugh	
1984	Scandalous	Pamella Reynolds	
