= Ann Morrish =

British actress (born 1928)

- Born: 15 June 1928 (age 98); Godstone, England
- Occupation: Actress
- Years active: 1948–2006
- Spouse: Powys Thomas (m. 1951; died 1977)
- Children: 3

Ann Morrish (born 15 June 1928) is a retired British actress and television presenter.

== Career ==
Morrish had a long career on stage, radio and television, and performed in the UK, Canada and the United States. She trained at the Old Vic Theatre School in London in the late 1940s, under George Devine, Michel Saint-Denis, and Glen Byam Shaw, and performed in the 1947-1948 Young Vic production of the Snow Queen, alongside her future husband Powys Thomas.

Her stage performances include the role of Julia in a Stratford Festival Company of Canada production of Two Gentlemen of Verona in New York in March 1958, and the role of Rosalind in Harold Lang's 1965 production of As You Like It alongside Phyllida Law at Regent's Park Open Air Theatre. In the autumn season 1964, she acted at the Bristol Old Vic (Colston Hall and Theatre Royal), playing roles in Isabelle, Mary Mary and The Beaux' Stratagem.

In July 1961 and April 1962, Morrish appeared on Canadian television in an adaptation of George Bernard Shaw's Village Wooing, alongside William Hutt.

Morrish's UK television appearances include regular roles in Compact and The Expert, as well as The House of Eliott, Minder, Softly Softly. She appeared in the 2006 Midsomer Murders episode "Four Funerals and a Wedding" as Mildred Danvers, which was her final acting role before retiring. In 1994, she played Emily Arundell in Agatha Christie's Poirot - Dumb Witness.

Her roles in television plays included the Welsh BAFTA winner written off by Derrick Geer. In addition, she was a presenter on Play School in the late 1960s and she appeared in the BBC children's drama series Break Point (1982), alongside Jeremy Burnham and Stephen Yardley. In the late 1970s, Morrish had a principal role as journalist Liz Tyson, in the long-running BBC radio soap-opera Waggoners' Walk.

== Family ==
Morrish married actor Powys Thomas in July 1951, and moved to Canada in 1956 for some years. Morrish has three children.
