= Norman Ettlinger =

English actor (1920–1979)

- Born: 20 January 1920; Hampstead, London, England, UK
- Died: 1979 (aged 58–59); Bergen, Norway
- Occupation: Actor

Norman Ettlinger (20 January 1920 – 1979), was an English actor who appeared in Rumpole of the Bailey as his colleague Percy Hoskins. He also played many other roles, both on stage and screen. He notably portrayed Boardman Wyatt in the original Broadway cast of the Donaldson Award and Outer Critics Circle Award winning play Billy Budd (1951).

He appeared in the 1963 episode "Keeley's Cousin", of the Canadian television series The Forest Rangers, where he played Major Nigel Keeley.

He died in 1979.
