= Regent Theatre (Toronto) =

Heritage cinema and live theatre venue

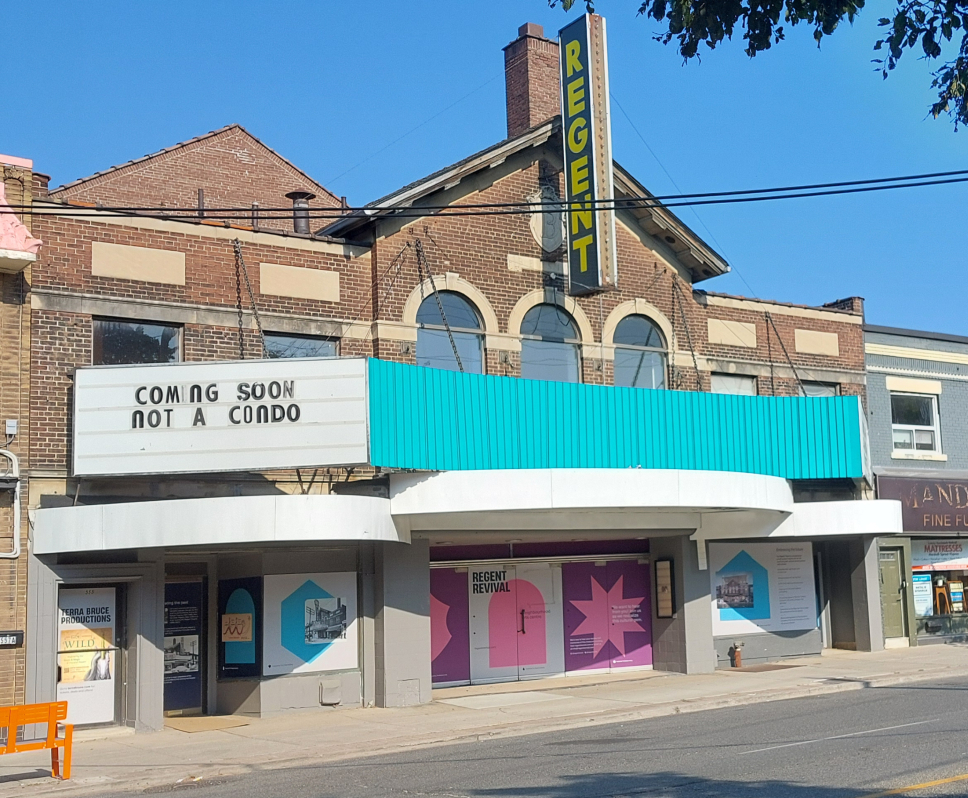
- View of the Regent Theatre facade from the north-west
- Interactive map of the Regent Theatre area

General information
- Location: 551 Mt Pleasant Road, Toronto, Ontario, Canada
- Coordinates: 43°42′11″N 79°23′15″W
- Inaugurated: March 17, 1927
- Cost: CA$160,000 (equivalent to $2,887,033 in 2025)
- Owner: Terra Bruce Productions

Design and construction
- Architect: Murray Brown

Ontario Heritage Act
- Type: Heritage Building
- Designated: 2022

The Regent Theatre is a live theatre and cinema venue in Toronto, Ontario, Canada. It opened in 1927, showing silent films as the Belsize Theatre, referring to its location on Mt Pleasant Road at Belsize Drive. It operated as the Belsize until 1950, when it was renovated and renamed the Crest Theatre. In 1954, it became a live theatre venue supporting the Crest Theatre Foundation theatre company. After the company vacated the theatre in 1966, it returned to showing films, showing first-run and repertory films. In 1988, it was renamed the Regent Theatre. In 2020, it was bought and is currently closed, in the process of being renovated to become again a live theatre space.

== History ==
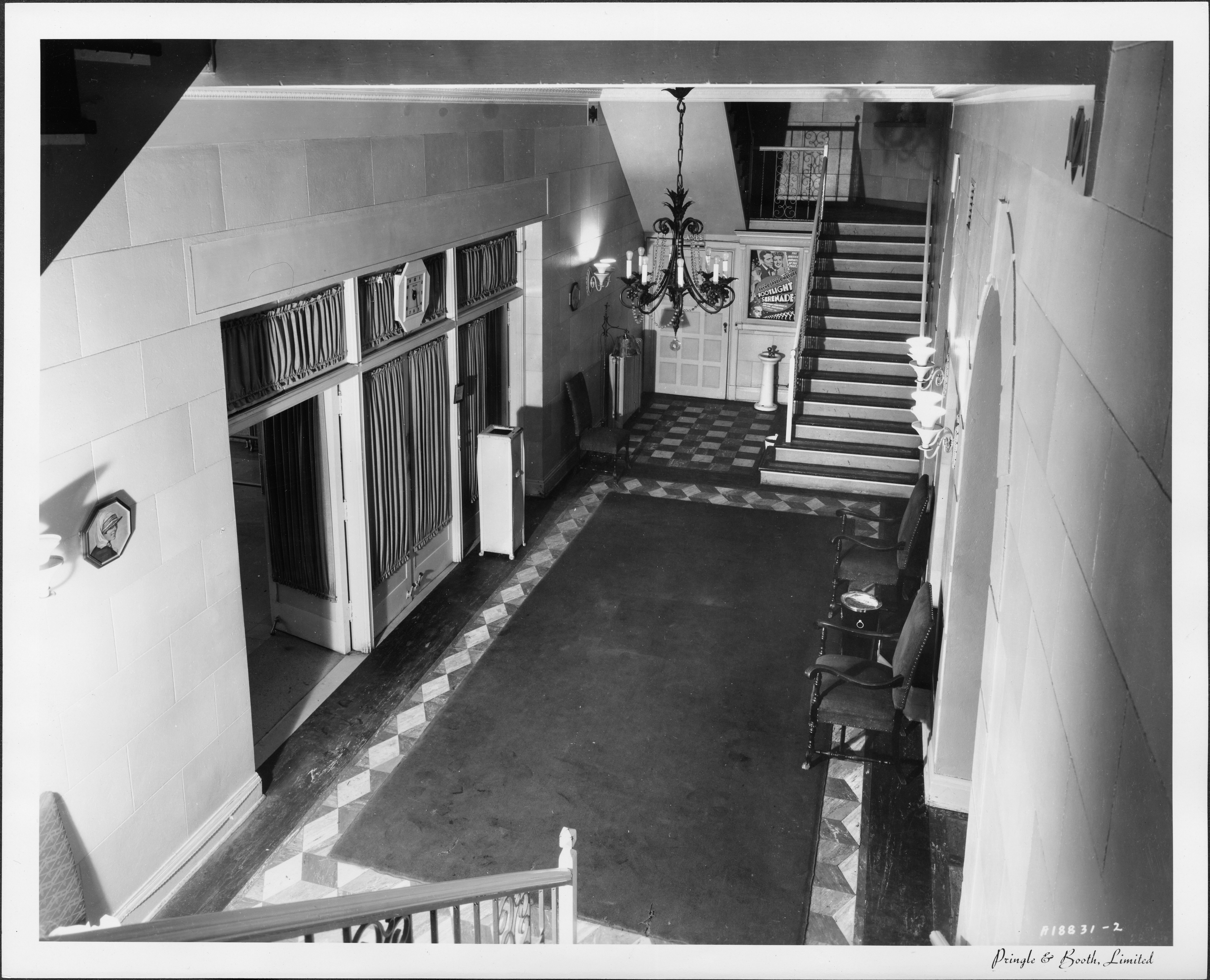
The lobby in 1942

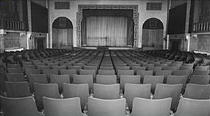
Interior in 1942

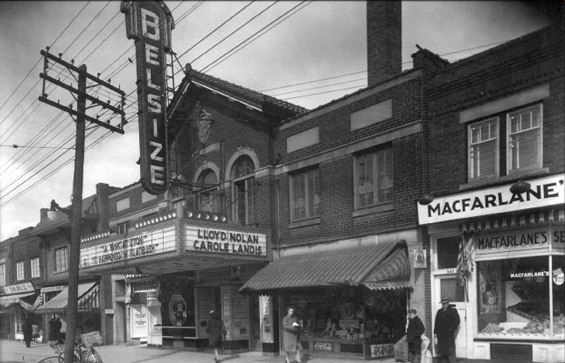
Belsize exterior in 1942

The theatre opened on March 17, 1927 as the Belsize Theatre for cinema as part of the chain of Famous Players Theatres. Seating 1,000, It was designed by Murray Brown, and built at a cost of CA$160,000 (equivalent to $2,887,033 in 2025). It was ceremonially opened by Toronto Mayor Foster. The interior was praised for "its fine arcade entrance", "Venetian mirrors" and friezes of "Carmen, the Spanish dancer, adorn the walls on each side, these pictures costing CA$1,200 each." The first film shown was It starring Clara Bow.

The theatre continued to show movies until the end of 1953. In 1950, it was renovated and its name was changed to the Crest Theatre. Changes included a new concession stand and externally a new marquee. It re-opened on August 3, 1950, now part of the '20th Century Theatres' chain. The building remained in the ownership of Famous Players.

In 1953, Donald and Murray Davis renovated the theatre for live performances, reducing the capacity to 822 seats, replacing the lighting, removing the pop-corn machine and the gum-and-candy-counter. Chewing gum was removed from the seat bottoms, the carpets were repaired and cleaned and the front four rows of seats removed as they allowed views backstage. Chandeliers from prior to the 1950 renovation were found in the basement and reinstalled in the front foyer. The theatre was renovated further in 1958 and 1963, when the stage was enlarged by about one-third.

The new Crest Theatre Foundation theatre company mounted over 140 productions, of 90 plays using Canadian actors and directors and playwrights from 1954 to 1966, when it could not continue due to its accrued debts.

After the live theatre closed, the building again showed films, and showed repertory films from 1971 onwards. In 1988, it was renovated, renamed the Regent Theatre, and rejoined the Famous Players chain. It operated as a cinema until 2020, when it was put up for sale.

Community activists lobbied for its preservation, leading to Toronto City Council proposing heritage status. The building was given heritage status under the Ontario Heritage Act in 2022.

In 2020, retired businessman Walter Schroeder purchased the theatre for productions of new Canadian musicals by his company, Terra Bruce. Designed by NORR Architects and Hariri Pontarini Architects, who designed the Tom Patterson Theatre for the Stratford Festival, the auditorium will have three stories and 600 seats. The interior is being converted to have two balconies and movable seating sections. This involves adding a third floor above the entrance. The exterior will see the removal of the exterior marquee, replaced with new smaller overhangs. A new addition to the rear will provide "back-of-house" facilities, and will be shaped like a house to blend with houses on the street.

The proposed rebuild received both community support and opposition. The plan was rejected at a City of Toronto Committee of Adjustment meeting. The owners appealed the decision to the Ontario Land Tribunal and won the appeal. As of April 2026, the project has not moved past the proposal stage.
