= Neil Vipond =

Canadian actor (1929–2022)

- Born: Neil Chester Vipond; December 24, 1929; Toronto, Ontario, Canada
- Died: July 15, 2022 (aged 92); Quakertown, Pennsylvania, U.S.
- Occupation(s): Actor, stage director

Neil Chester Vipond (December 24, 1929 – July 15, 2022) was an American-based Canadian actor and stage director.

== Life and career ==
Vipond was born and grew up in Toronto, Ontario, Canada, his father a salesman and his mother a former performer on the vaudeville circuit. He started his acting career with the International Players in Kingston, Ontario in 1951. Two years later he appeared at the Stratford Shakespearean Festival, and was in the company for five seasons.

Vipond also appeared on stage in Toronto. He appeared in the premiere production by the Crest Theatre in Toronto, Richard of Bordeaux in January 1954 and The Man Who Came to Dinner later that year.

Vipond spent much of his adult life in New York and Toronto, but in the early 1990s, he moved to Los Angeles. He died on July 15, 2022, aged 92, at his home in Quakertown, Pennsylvania.

== Filmography ==
Film
Year	Title	Role	Notes
1957	Oedipus Rex	Chorus	
1973	The Hard Part Begins	Hank Riley	
1980	Phobia	Dr. Clegg	
1981	Kings and Desperate Men	Henry Sutton	
1982	Paradise	Reverend Aviva Marks	
1999	The Fair	Rachel	
2021	Floaty	Cecil	

TV
Year	Title	Role	Notes
1953	General Motors Theatre	Will	Episode: "Teach Me How to Cry"
1956	General Motors Theatre	Don	Episode: "Somewhere Every Summer"
1958	Kraft Television Theatre		Episode: "The Last of the Belles"
1972	To See Ourselves		Episode: "The Ninth Summer"
1975	Sidestreet		Episode: "The Rebellion of Bertha MacKenzie"
1976	Performance		Episode: "Fellowship"
1977	The New Avengers	Chuck Peters	Episode: "The Gladiators"
1982	Macbeth	Duncan	TV film
1987	Bay Coven	Mr. Welsley	TV film
1988	Adderly		Episode: "Adventures in Bodysitting"
1988	War of the Worlds	Reverend	Episode: "A Multitude of Idols"
1990	Neon Rider	Alister Craddige	Episode: "Devil's Child"
1991	Life Goes On	Waiter	Episode: "Last Stand in Glen Brook"
1991	L.A. Law	Judge Kennedy	Episode: "As God Is My Co-Defendant"
1991	Darrow	Edward Lorber	TV film
1991	Marilyn and Me	Henry Hathaway	TV film
1991	The Woman Who Sinned	Novack	TV film
1992	Something to Live for: The Alison Gertz Story	Administrator	TV film
1993	Mad About You	Friendly Man	Episode: "The Wedding Affair"
1993	Melrose Place	Minister	Episode: "End Game"
1993	Street Legal	Gordon Duffy	Episode: "What's Love Got to Do with It?"
1996	Tracey Takes On...	Judge	Episode: "Vanity"
1996	Dream On	Priest	Episode: "Finale with a Vengeance"
1996	Frasier	Judge	Episode: "Crane vs. Crane"
1996	Once You Meet a Stranger	Mr. Cunningham	TV film
1997	Poltergeist: The Legacy	Benjamin Caldwell	Episode: "Silent Partner"
1998	Star Trek: Deep Space Nine	Darok	Episode: "Once More unto the Breach"
1998-1999	Any Day Now		
1999-2005	Will & Grace	Julius	Recurring Role
2001	Star Trek: Voyager	Kleg, Flying Instructor	Episode: "Natural Law"
2005	Medium	Old Henry Stoller	Episode: "I married a mind reader"
