= Ruth Springford =

Canadian radio, stage and television actress (1921–2010)

- Born: September 1921
- Died: November 20, 2010 (aged 89); Etobicoke, Ontario, Canada
- Occupation: actor

Margaret Ruth Springford (September 1921 – November 20, 2010) was a Canadian radio, stage, television and film actress.

== Biography ==
Springford was the daughter of Walter and Elspeth Springford. Little is known of her personal life, but it appears she never married. Her parents enrolled her in drama school at age seven.

Springford began her acting career modestly, her first paying role in a church play at age nine. Springford was a member of the Straw Hat Players summer stock troupe, and later acted at the Crest Theatre in Toronto in Summer of the Seventeenth Doll and Cat on a Hot Tin Roof. Summer of the Seventeenth Doll would move from the Crest to the Royal Alexandra Theatre (Royal Alex) to continue its run. For Ruth, it fulfilled a then-lifelong dream to act at the Royal Alex.

On radio, she appeared in the Canadian Broadcasting Corporation (CBC) Radio dramatic anthology series "Stage", produced by Andrew Allan at CBC Vancouver.

On television, her credits include Hangin' In, A Gift to Last, The Frankie Howerd Show and Maggie Muggins, as well as the Jim Henson teleplay The Cube and the TV movie Nellie McClung.

On film, Springford has appeared in the feature film The Changeling.

Ruth Springford died at Etobicoke General Hospital, Etobicoke, Ontario, on November 20, 2010, aged 89.

== Filmography ==
- One Plus One (1961) - (segment "Baby")
- 5 Card Stud (1968) - Mama Malone
- Sunday in the Country (1974) - Churchgoer
- The Changeling (1980) - Minnie Huxley
- Improper Channels (1981) - Mrs. Wharton

== Awards ==
A longtime member of ACTRA, she received the following:

- Andrew Allan Award
- Canadian Film Award (1969) - Best Supporting Actress (for an appearance in the "Does Anybody Here Know Denny" episode of "Corwin")
- John Drainie Award (1979) - Lifetime Achievement
- ACTRA Award - Best Radio Performance
- Dora Mavor Moore Award
