= Barbara Chilcott =

Canadian actress (1922–2022)

- Born: Barbara Chilcott Davis; September 10, 1922; Newmarket, Ontario, Canada
- Died: January 1, 2022 (aged 99); Toronto, Ontario, Canada
- Education: Royal Central School of Speech and Drama
- Occupation: Actress
- Years active: 1949–1999
- Spouse: Max Helpmann (m. 1952, divorced) Harry Somers (m. 1967)

Barbara Chilcott Davis (September 10, 1922 – January 1, 2022) was a Canadian actress.

== Career ==
After the war she studied at the Central School of Speech and Drama in London and made her West End debut in 1949. On her return to Canada in 1950, she soon became one of the country's leading actresses. In 1953, with her brothers Murray and Donald Davis, she founded the Crest Theatre troupe in Toronto, which operated until 1966.

Chilcott died in Toronto on January 1, 2022, at the age of 99.

== Partial filmography ==
- 1960 The Full Treatment as Baroness de la Vailion
- 1966 The Trap as Trader's Wife
- 1975 Lies My Father Told Me as Mrs. Tannenbaum
- 1993 M. Butterfly as Critic at Garden Party
- 1996 No Contest II as Mrs. Holman
