= Norma Renault =

Canadian actress (1923–2012)

- Born: Norma Jacqueline Renault; July 28, 1923; Toronto, Ontario
- Died: March 3, 2012 (aged 88); Toronto, Ontario
- Occupation: Actress
- Spouse: Avrom Isaacs (m. 1956–1987)

Norma Renault (July 28, 1923 – March 3, 2012) was a singer and actress who starred in theatre, television, and film productions in Canada and London, England, including the musical Salad Days at the Crest Theatre in Toronto.

== Biography ==
Norma Renault was born in Toronto, Ontario in 1923. As a young woman, she sang with the Leslie Bell Singers, a female choir formed in 1939 from former pupils of Leslie Bell at Parkdale Collegiate Institute in Toronto, which became the Leslie Bell Singers in 1945. She began to act with an amateur group called the Deep River Players in Deep River, Ontario.

Renault starred in theatre productions in Canada and London, England, including the musical Salad Days at the Crest Theatre in Toronto and on the road in New York City, as well as Epitaph for George Dillon at the Grand Theatre in London, Ontario. She is mentioned for her role in the Crest's production of The Man Who Came to Dinner along with Amelia Hall (both "beloved Canadians") who prompted bouts of audience laughter during every exchange of dialogue. "Even Nathan Cohen admitted (perhaps somewhat inscrutably) that he found the production amazing". In all, Renault performed in 12 Crest productions, and produced a production of Epitaph for George Dillon at the Crest in 1960.

From 1950–1983, she worked in productions for various television shows, often for the Canadian Broadcasting Company. She appeared in four episodes of the TV series Folio (1955–1959), The Unforeseen (1958), and Festival (1960–1969) which aired on CBC Television.

Renault was a cast member in the television documentary film A Further Glimpse of Joey (1961), alongside Martha Henry in the CBC television drama Talking to a Stranger (1969) and in the three part miniseries You've Come a Long Way, Katie (1981).

== Stage ==
=== Theatre and broadcasting ===
Year	Title	Role(s)	Theatre Company	Venue(s)			
1954	A Jig for the Gypsy		Crest Theatre Ltd.	The Crest Theatre			
1954	The Man Who Came to Dinner		Crest Theatre Ltd.	The Crest Theatre			
1954	General Motors Presents - Lies My Father Told Me	cast member	CBC TV				
1955	General Motors Theatre - Forever Galatea	cast member	CBC TV				
1955	CBC Folio - Macbeth	cast member	CBC TV				
1956	The Women		Crest Theatre Ltd.	The Crest Theatre			
1957	The Cherry Orchard	Varya	The Crest Theatre Foundation	The Crest Theatre			
1957	A Plastic Item - Leo Orenstein Collection	cast member	CBC TV				
1958	Salad Days	Lady Raeburn, The Charlady, The Tarty Lady, Asphyxia (and the other arms), a Spinster, Marguerite	The Crest Theatre Foundation	The Crest Theatre			
1959	Ride A Pink Horse	Lorna Harvey, Immigration, Wanda McTavish	The Crest Theatre Foundation	The Crest Theatre			
1959	The Matchmaker		The Crest Theatre Foundation	The Crest Theatre			
1959	Under Milk Wood	Polly Garter, Mrs. Ogmore-Pritchard, Mrs. Cherry Owen, First Neighbour, Another Mother, Fourth Woman, 2nd Woman’s Voice	The Crest Theatre Foundation	The Crest Theatre			
1959	Mrs. Gibbons' Boys	Myra Hood	The Crest Theatre Foundation	The Crest Theatre			
1959	After Hours		The Stratford Festival	Mountain Playhouse and Festival Concert Hall			
1960	Heartbreak House	Mrs. Hushabye	The Crest Theatre Foundation	The Crest Theatre			
1960	Honour Thy Father	Blanche	The Crest Theatre Foundation	The Crest Theatre			
1962	Festival - Grand Exits	cast member	CBC TV				
1962	The American Dream	Granny	The Crest Theatre Foundation	The Grenville Street Playhouse			
1963	Festival - Diary of a Scoundrel	cast member	CBC TV				
1963	Playdate - With My Heart Tucked Underneath My Arm	cast member	CBC TV				
1964	Eli - The Fanatic	cast member	CBC TV				
1964	Bedlam Galore - for Two or More	cast member	CBC TV				
1966	Festival - The Murderer	Katerina	CBC TV				
1966	Festival - Ashes to Ashes	cast member	CBC TV				
1966	A Further Glimpse of Joey	Sheila	CBC Special				
1971	Talking to a Stranger - Episode 1	the mother	CBC TV				
1971	Talking to a Stranger - Episode 2	the mother	CBC TV				
1971	Talking to a Stranger - Episode 4	the mother	CBC TV				
1974	House of Pride - Episode 7	cast member	CBC TV				
1974	House of Pride - Episode 9	cast member	CBC TV				
1974	The Play's the Thing -Back to Beulah	cast member	CBC TV				
1974	House of Pride - Episode 14	cast member	CBC TV				
1975	House of Pride - Episode 11	cast member	CBC TV				
1975	House of Pride - Episode 16	cast member	CBC TV				
1980	The Killing of Sister George	June Buckridge (Sister George)	Theatre London	McManus Theatre			
1981	You've Come a Long Way, Katie (part 2 - Month on the Moon)	cast member	CBC TV	1981	You've Come a Long Way, Katie (part 3 The Bottom Line)	cast member	CBC TV
1981-1982	Blithe Spirit	Madame Arcati	Theatre London				
1982	Home Fires - We'll Meet Again (first program third series)	cast member	CBC TV	1982	All the Days of My Life	cast member	CBC Special TV
1983	Later	Molly	Toronto Free Theatre				
