= La Bonne Soupe =

1964 film

La bonne soupe (also known as Careless Love) is a 1964 French film directed by Robert Thomas. It is based on the play La bonne soupe (The Good Soup) by Félicien Marceau.

== Plot ==
A French woman recounts her many complicated romances to a casino croupier.

== Cast ==
- Annie Girardot as Marie-Paule (young)
- Marie Bell as Marie-Paule (older)
- Gérard Blain as Painter
- Bernard Blier as Monsieur Joseph
- Jean-Claude Brialy as Jacquot
- Blanchette Brunoy as Angèle
- Claude Dauphin as Monsieur Oscar
- Sacha Distel as Roger
- Daniel Gélin as Raymond
- Denise Grey as Madame Boudard
- Jane Marken as Madame Alphonse
- Christian Marquand as Lucien Volard

== Reception ==
According to Fox records, the film needed to earn $1,800,000 in film rentals to break even and made $1,110,000, meaning it lost money.
