= Crest Theatre Foundation =

Canadian professional theatre company

- Facade of Crest Theatre
- Successor: Theatre Toronto
- Formation: 1954
- Founder: Donald and Murray Davis
- Founded at: Toronto
- Dissolved: 1966
- Type: Theatre Company
- Legal status: defunct
- Location: Toronto, Ontario, Canada
- Region served: Toronto
- Formerly called: Murray and Donald Davis Ltd.

The Crest Theatre Foundation was a professional theatre company in Toronto, Ontario, Canada that operated from 1954 to 1966. The company performed in the Crest Theatre, a former cinema converted to live theatre.

In 1950s Toronto, live theatre was mostly touring companies of English and American productions with little Canadian participation. Recent graduates of the University of Toronto Theatre program were determined to change this. The Crest Foundation was a new company producing plays, both international and Canadian. Two graduates: Donald and Murray Davis set up a new limited company in 1953 and leased the Crest Theatre, opening their first production in January 1954.

The Crest provided valuable work and exposure for up-and-coming and little-known Canadian actors, directors and playwrights. By the time the Crest finally closed, the Canadian live theatre scene had expanded greatly, and many of those who had participated at the Crest moved on to notable careers in film, television and theatre.

After several seasons, the theatre company was in debt and running a deficit each season. In 1957, a non-profit foundation was set up, making the theatre eligible for government arts grants. However the new organization was not enough to keep it going, and the accumulated debt grew. After twelve seasons, the Crest folded. In 1968, Theatre Toronto was formed from the Crest and Canadian Players organizations. It would eventually become the St. Lawrence Centre for the Arts' production company.

== History ==
In post-war Canada, there were few Canadian live theatre companies, and few outlets for Canadian playwrights. Canadian actors typically found work in touring productions, or on radio and television.

In Toronto, audiences interested in professional theatre saw mainly touring productions from Britain or the USA. As well, Toronto had lost its largest theatre venue, the Princess Theatre in 1930, and several theatres, such as the Elgin and Winter Garden Theatres and Pantages Theater had been converted to cinemas. The opening of the St. Lawrence Centre for the Arts, the O'Keefe Centre and the inauguration of the independent theatre troupes that Toronto has today, was still decades away.

=== Straw Hat Players ===
In 1948, Murray and Donald Davis, recent alumni of the University of Toronto theatre program, founded the Straw Hat Players summer troupe performing in the Muskoka area of Ontario at the Port Carling Memorial Hall in Bala. The Davises and fellow classmates Araby Lockhart, Eric House, Charmion King and Ted Follows starred in the premiere production The Drunkard in 1948. In 1955, the Davises relinquished control of the Straw Hat Players after the founding of the Crest. It continued to hire university student actors. In 1958, Davis' cousin William Davis took over the company and ran it until 1961. Others continued the summer productions until 1968. In 1969, a successor organization, Theatre 21, continued productions in Muskoka.

=== Founding ===
In 1950, the Royal Commission on National Development in the Arts, Letters and Sciences (Massey-Lévesque Commission) led to the development of subsidies to develop the arts in Canada. The Crest Theatre troupe was founded in 1953 by Murray and Donald Davis and their sister Barbara Chilcott. The opening of the Crest, less than three years after the Massey-Levesque report, signalled the beginning of an indigenous, commercial theatre in Toronto. The company's mandate was to establish a repertory theatre and to "contribute to the cultural life of Canada by providing opportunities for the development of Canadian artistic directors, playwrights, designers, managers and technicians."

The company took over the 822-seat Crest Theatre (formerly named the Belsize) built in 1927, located on Mount Pleasant Road at Belsize Drive. The theatre, a first-run cinema, had a small stage, and it was renovated for live theatre.

The company recruited professionals from London, England to help the theatre get off its feet. The company recruited the general manager of the Arts Theatre in London, England, Brian Maller, to be business manager. The company also hired persons from British theatre on six-month contracts in key positions. John Blatchley and Pierre Lefevre were hired to alternately direct plays in the first season. Set and costume design also went to another British veteran, Hutchinson Scott. All of the British hires had clauses in their contracts that they must train Canadian assistants as their replacements when they went back to Britain.

Costume production was done in-house, in a store nearby the Crest by Theatre staff, to the designs needed for each play. Set construction was done in an 1800s-era, unheated old warehouse near Logan and Gerrard and delivered to the Theatre in time for dress rehearsal.

The Crest opened its first play on January 5, 1954, with a production of Richard of Bordeaux, starring Chilcott, Murray Davis and Patrick Macnee, directed by Blatchley. On opening night, the theatre was picketed by a theatre union, claiming that the theatre owners Famous Players were required to hire full-time backstage staff and an orchestra for vaudeville. In all, the company staged eleven plays in its first season, playing through June of that year. All plays had two-week runs.

In the fall of 1956, the company preceded its productions with a week of performances by French mime Marcel Marceau. These were lucrative for the company and provided a good source of funds for the season ahead.

In 1957, British author J.B. Priestley wrote The Glass Cage for the brothers and premiered it with the company in Toronto. The troupe then moved the play to London's West End. This was the first all-Canadian troupe to play in London. Another notable play was The Three Sisters, directed by Jack Landau and starring Kate Reid, Charmion King, Amelia Hall and Powys Thomas. Barry Morse directed Salad Days in 1958, then took the production to New York where it ran off-Broadway for 80 performances.

=== Significance in Canadian theatre ===
The Crest was acted mainly by Canadian actors. Toronto had had theatre companies before (such as the Cummings Stock Company), but most theatrical productions in Toronto before World War II were touring productions from Broadway and London, such as those performed at the Royal Alexandra Theatre and the Princess Theatre using the touring cast. Also, the Crest premiered plays written by Canadian playwrights, and used Canadian directors. The play selection varied between Shakespeare, musicals, dramas and revues. Production was done using Canadian staff with sets and costumes produced in-house. Crest, along with the Stratford Festival, and later the Shaw Festival, helped establish a permanent Canadian theatre company presence in the 1950s and early 1960s. The Crest also mounted touring productions, and summer productions.

The list of Canadian actors to have performed at the Crest is extensive. For many, these were early performances in their careers. The list includes John Baylis, Dave Broadfoot, William Brydon, Jackie Burroughs, Dinah Christie, Robert Christie, Leo Ciceri, Peter Cullen, Fred Davis, Louis del Grande, Peter Donat, James Doohan, Jack Duffy, Colin Fox, Don Francks, David Gardner, Robert Goulet, Bruno Gerussi, Amelia Hall, Paul Harding, Barbara Hamilton, Martha Henry, Eric House, Frances Hyland, Charmion King, Tom Kneebone, Marilyn Lightstone, George McCowan, Richard Monette, Barry Morse, William Needles, Gordon Pinsent, Kate Reid, Norma Renault, Douglas Rain, Toby Robins, Toby Tarnow, John Vernon, Jonathan White and Austin Willis.

Directors included Malcolm Black, Douglas Campbell, Marigold Charlesworth, David Gardner, Robert Gill, John Hirsch, John Holden, Allan Lund, Leon Major, George McCowan, Barry Morse, Mavor Moore, Curt Reis, Jean Roberts, Herbert Whittaker, and Donald and Murray Davis.

The founders each acted with the troupe. Barbara Chilcott was Viola in Twelfth Night, Antigone in Antigone, and her favourite role, Cleopatra in Antony and Cleopatra, and many other roles. Murray was Richard II in Richard of Bordeaux.

In all, the company produced more than 90 plays from both Canadian and international repertoires. These included plays by Canadians Robertson Davies, Marcel Dubé, John Gray, Mavor Moore and Bernard Slade.

=== Management, financing and conclusion ===
The company paid a monthly rent of CA$1,500 (equivalent to $17,468 in 2025) and in 1964 had a yearly budget of CA$300,000. The company's business model was to put on 40 weeks of productions, each production running for two weeks at a time. The productions would not bring in an international star at high fees, instead attention was spent on all parts of a production: the quality of the drama, acting, sets, lighting, all overseen by the company's producer. This was similar to the model created by the Tennent Organization in London, which was able to produce up to 15 plays per month in London's West End and the Davises hoped to be commercially successful enough to be viable.

The enterprise was financed by ticket revenues, arts grants and sponsors. Ticket prices were lower than the downtown venue, both for competitive reasons and wanting to be widely affordable. It experimented with a mixture of private and public funding, beginning as a limited-liability company. According to Murray, "what we are interested in primarily is to establish a policy of good entertainment at popular prices but on a business basis which returns dividends to our shareholders." Ticket prices ranged from 75 cents in the rear balcony to CA$3 (equivalent to $34.94 in 2025) and the Davises calculated that an average of 50% full houses, the theatre could return a surplus.

However, the limited company did not last. In 1957, the Crest reorganized as a non-profit foundation run by a board of directors. Expectations of profitability had changed and the goal was to break even or return a surplus not simply on ticket revenues. On this point, the foundation was unsuccessful. The foundation ran annual deficits of an average of CA$30,000 and was repeatedly bailed out by private support, the Canada Council for the Arts and the Ontario Council for the Arts. The situation was not unique to the Crest, the Canadian Players (a touring company for Stratford Festival actors) also failed at the same time as the Crest.

The Crest troupe wound up its operations after its final performance on April 30, 1966, after mounting 140 productions. In the previous year, the Canada Council refused the theatre its annual CA$20,000 grant, eventually reinstated it, but the first two productions of 1966 were failures and artistic director Murray Davis resigned. The troupe was able to finance its final season with a public subscription campaign and reinstated grants. However, at the end of its final run, and its final production of Hedda Gabler, it was reported to be CA$33,000 in debt for the season.

The Crest Foundation hoped to merge with the Canadian Players Foundation to continue, however both foundations had accumulated debts of CA$100,000 (equivalent to $938,286 in 2025) each, complicating plans to continue. Plans finally collapsed when prospective artistic directors Marigold Charlesworth and Jean Roberts cut ties when the Foundation could not resolve its financial situation. The Crest Theatre Foundation gave up its tenancy at the Crest theatre and the Canadian Players gave up its tenancy at the Central Library theatre and cancelled its 1966-1967 season. Charlesworth and Roberts had hoped to do one season with the merged groups and then move into the St. Lawrence Centre for the Arts downtown.

=== Legacy ===
In 1968, a new entity, Theatre Toronto would emerge, effectively a merger of the Crest and Canadian Players. The artistic director was Clifford Williams, formerly of the Royal Shakespeare Company. It put on productions at the Royal Alexandra for two seasons. When the new St. Lawrence Centre was completed in 1970, Theatre Toronto would merge with its organization and become the St Lawrence Centre's Toronto Arts Foundation, under artistic director Leon Major.

Murray Davis died in 1997. His fonds of theatre material is in Library and Archives Canada, along with the fonds of his sister Barbara Chilcott who died in 2022, and his brother Donald who died in 1998. A collection of Crest Theatre photographs and documents is in the collection of the Toronto Public Library.

== Seasons ==
=== 1954 ===
January began with Gordon Daviot's Richard of Bordeaux, "a colourful period drama", the Crest's premiere production, launching the Crest in a wave of optimism in Toronto theatre circles. Murray Davis played Richard, with a large cast including Eric House playing three roles, Patrick Macnee, Max Helpmann, Neil Vipond, Barbara Chilcott, Norma Renault and Betty Leighton. The theatre was fully booked by the Toronto branch of the Canadian Women's Press Club to launch the theatre.

In the sport span of January through May, the Crest players put on ten productions at the Crest, and put on Amphitryon 38 with their Straw Hat Players in Muskoka during the summer.

=== 1954-55 ===
The first play of the season was a play by Robertson Davies: A Jig for the Gypsy, their first production by a Canadian playwright. It met with mixed reviews, but was popular with audiences. This was followed with a successful and positively reviewed The Man Who Came to Dinner, with Kathleen Kidd, Norma Renault, Barbara Chilcott and Neil Vipond. Playwright Graham Greene premiered his The Living Room starring Frances Hyland at the Crest in October, before taking it to Broadway. The October 4 performance was interrupted by Hurricane Hazel knocking out the power. The play went on, lit by lanterns.

In January, the Crest produced their first Shakespearean play Twelfth Night, directed by Basil Coleman. However, this was the highlight of the first half of the season, as the rest was unpopular. British director Michael Langham, brought in to direct four plays, clashed with the players and the result was uninspired productions, and box office receipts suffered.

=== 1955-56 ===
In the fall, a week of Marcel Marceau performances was well-received and well-attended. The Davises changed up their play mix for the fall, They Knew What They Wanted, featuring Bruno Gerussi, hoping to capitalize on Toronto's large Italian diaspora. This was followed by The Fourposter, a hit on Broadway, but also one with a feminist tone, and performed by real-life couple Barbara Chilcott and Max Helpmann. This was followed by Othello and another Davies play Hunting Stuart, Shaw's Saint Joan, Christmas in the Market Place and the mystery An Inspector Calls. The season was critically and commercially successful, although the Davies play was controversial to the mores of the period in Toronto.

The winter season was a busy season. The Crest premiered Shaw's You Never Can Tell, Richard Nash's The Rainmaker, The School for Scandal, Come Back Little Sheba, Antigone, Noël Coward's Present Laughter, Agatha Christie's Murder at the Vicarage, Peter Ustinov's The Indifferent Shepherd, The Women and the Canadian play Zone by Marcel Dube.

=== 1956-57 ===
The season began with a production of Gigi, directed by George McCowan and starring Kate Reid and Austin Willis. Joseph Furst directed Misery Me with Powys Thomas and Charmion King. The Italian farce An Italian Straw Hat followed starring Richard Easton. The next productions were classics: Chekhov's The Three Sisters, Shakespeare's Anthony and Cleopatra and Shaw's Village Wooing and How He Lied to Her Husband.

March saw the premiere of J. B. Priestley's The Glass Cage, directed by Henry Kaplan, and starring the company's three founders: Donald and Murray Davis and Barbara Chilcott, and William Needles. After its run at the Crest, the production moved to London, England to play at the Piccadilly Theatre, temporarily leaving the Crest without a Davis family member in charge. The London run was well-received by critics, closing after a short run of 35 performances to go on tour, with one performance aired on Granada TV.

The spring season ended with two well-attended productions, She Stoops to Conquer and Anniversary Waltz, which was extended by two weeks, becoming the theatre's most lucrative production. Despite this, the season overall was not a financial success, leaving the theatre's financial position precarious. The theatre was healthy enough to tour Pillars of Society during the summer with the Crest Theatre Club.

=== 1957-58 ===
In the summer of 1957, the Davises covered the theatre's debt and dissolved the limited company partnership. At the suggestion of Malcolm Black, it was reconstituted as a non-profit foundation, becoming eligible for government grants, and board member donations would be tax-deductible.

The fall season started with a hit production, Witness for the Prosecution starring John Drainie, which did so well it was brought back in January 1958 for a second run. This was followed by Jack Landau's The Cherry Orchard. This was followed a smash six-week run by Gore Vidal's Visit to a Small Planet, starring John Drainie, Jack Creley, Jane Mallett, Toby Robins and Robert Goulet. It set Canadian box-office records. The spring season concluded with Graham Greene's The Potting Shed, Double Image, Mavor Moore's The Ottawa Man followed by the popular Agatha Christie mystery The Mousetrap.

=== 1958-59 ===
The fall season started off with a strong six-week run of Salad Days, followed by a five-week run of Inherit the Wind, and a three-week run of Shaw's Pygmalion, only ended for the company to break for Christmas.

The winter and spring selection of productions was more ambitious, producing seven plays. January saw the Crest put on the revue This Is Our First Affair. This was followed by Thunder Rock by Robert Ardrey starring the popular Robert Goulet. Barbara Chilcott returned from England to star in Summer of the Seventeenth Doll by Ray Lawler. This was followed by John Osbourne's The Entertainer featuring Eric House and the Spewack's My Three Angels with Dawn Greenhalgh. The Crest presented a Canada Council-supported Canadian play by John Gray: Ride a Pink Horse, followed by the Agatha Christie mystery The Hollow and an August Leon Major production of Two for the Seesaw which was a current Broadway hit.

=== 1959-60 ===
Before the season, Donald Davis left Toronto and the Crest to pursue acting in New York City, leaving Murray Davis as artistic director.

Murray would direct 'Thornton Wilder's The Matchmaker with Amelia Hall and Powys Thomas. Thomas would direct the next play Under Milk Wood by Dylan Thomas. George McCowan would direct three plays: Mrs. Gibbons' Boys, You Can't Take It With You and Michael Jacot's Honour Thy Father. Shakespeare's Macbeth with Powys Thomas, Charmion King and John Vernon, was mounted by Mavor Moore. Royston Morley directed two plays: Shaw's Heartbreak House and Chekhov's The Seagull. Jean Roberts would co-direct The Schoolmistress with Murray Davis, then solo direct Agatha Christie's The Unexpected Guest.

The season was concluded with a musical review directed by Alvin Ailey, African Holiday consisting of music, dance and rituals from Africa which had debuted at New York's Apollo Theatre and gone on tour.

=== 1960-61 ===
The previous season had left the Crest deeply in debt. A season ticket fundraising campaign was launched, and a program of outside "associate producers" was launched, with the producers backing each production, instead of the Crest Foundation. This included Norma Renault, who had appeared in Heartbreak House and Honour Thy Father at the Crest. The fall season began with John Osborne's Epitaph for George Dillon, starring Martha Henry, Charmion King, Betty Leighton and Patricia Moffatt, directed by George McCowan, and produced by Renault, who backed it financially. The Globe and Mail's Herbert Whittaker reviewed it positively.

Leon Major would direct two plays: Long Day's Journey into Night in October, The Heiress in March, with Frances Hyland. The Long Day's Journey into Night was produced by Gwen Ffrangcon-Davies, who also starred in the play. This was a rare performance of the play, only authorized by O'Neill's widow on the condition Ffrangcon-Davies play the role of the mother. Due to its popularity, the play was extended for a third week. Ffrangcon-Davies also produced The Different Aspects of Love, a mix of poetry and drama, highlighting Shakespearean heroines.

Major also directed Murray Davis and Alan Nunn directed The Long and the Short and the Tall by Willis Hall, starring Geoffrey Alexander and James Beggs in November. Due to its popularity, it was brought back for a second run in January. After its second run, John Fenwick directed The Gay Chaperone, based on Sheridan's The Duenna, with music by Julian Slade.

Shakespeare's King Lear was produced in November with Mavor Moore and James Doohan. The play had a guaranteed audience as it was on Ontario high schools' curriculum.

The season concluded with Spring Thaw '61 presented by Mavor Moore, who transplanted the production of sketches on Canadian themes from the Museum Theatre to the Crest. It was very popular and was presented again in 1962.

=== 1961-62 ===
This season, Murray Davis and Leon Major split most directing duties. The season began with Big Fish, Little Fish directed by Davis. Major directed Albee's Zoo Story partnered with the experimental Krapp's Last Tape directed by Alan Schneider and starring Donald Davis, back from New York where he had performed the play. Major then directed Jean Giraudoux's The Madwoman of Chaillot with Charmion King, Kate Reid, Barbara Hamilton, Barbara Chilcot, Gordon Pinsent and Bruno Gerussi, and Davis concluded the fall season with Bernard Slade's Simon Says Get Married with Austin Willis and Jill Foster.

Major opened the winter season with Shaw's Caesar and Cleopatra with Toby Robins, Mavor Moore, Frances Hyland, Gordon Pinsent and Jonathan White. Davis then directed The Shifting Heart with Barbara Chilcott, Wesker's Roots again with Chilcott, and Roar Like a Dove with Charmion King and Austin Willis. Major concluded the season with the production of Spring Thaw '62 with Barbara Hamilton, Don Francks, Peter Mews and Corinne Conley.

=== 1962-63 ===
The season began with Twelve Angry Men with James Beggs, Will Brydon and Murray Davis. Harvey Hart directed two plays during the fall: Who'll Save the Ploughboy with Brydon and Tobi Wenberg, Orpheus Descending with Charmion King and Barbara Chilcott. Clandestine on the Morning Line with Barbara Hamilton was directed by Curt Reis, and in December Leon Major directed The Enchanted with Martha Henry, Norman Welsh and Bernard Behrens. It was Major's final production with the Crest, as he would move to Halifax to found the Neptune Theatre in 1963.

The winter and spring was busy with seven plays. The first play of the winter was Shaw's Arms and the Man, directed by Murray, with William Brydon, Cosette Lee, Gorden Pinsent, and introducing Jackie Burroughs. Henry Kaplan directed La Bonne Soupe with Tom Kneebone, Louis Negin and Barbara Chilcott. Rein Andre directed I Remember Mama with Heinar Pillar, Valve Andre, and Natalie Baums. George McCowan directed The Seven-Year Itch with Douglas Rain and Toby Tarnow. John Hirsch directed Cat on a Hot Tin Roof with Toby Robins and Bruno Gerussi. Barbara Hamilton and Tom Kneebone starred in That Hamilton Woman directed by Alan Lund, and the season concluded with The Sound of Murder with Paul Harding and Donald Ewer.

=== 1963–64 ===
The fall season was presented in a repertory fashion, where the three plays were each performed twice a week. The three were Juno and the Paycock with Robert Christie, Maureen Fitzgerald and Jackie Burroughs, Of Mice and Men with Sean Sullivan, Ken James and Jackie Burroughs, and Born Yesterday with William Brydon, Marilyn Gardner and Chris Wiggins. The play for the Christmas season was Mr. Scrooge. The theatre's audiences continued to decline. The company was usually in overdraft at the bank and was repeatedly bailed out by investors.

The first production of the winter was Hamlet which debuted a 19-year-old Hamlet: Richard Monette, the youngest actor ever to portray Hamlet. While Monette was popular with teenage students who viewed the play as part of their high school curriculum, the production was panned critically, highlighting the lackluster sets and music, all that the Crest could afford. This was followed by Caesar and Cleopatra, directed by Curt Reis, which was highly rated critically, and possibly one of the Crest's best ever. These were the highlights, but the last two of the spring, A Far Country and Evelyn were critical and commercial failures.

=== 1964-65 ===
The 1964-65 season was cut in half when the Canada Council for the Arts refused to give their annual grant to the company and the Ontario Arts Council only helped with a partial emergency grant. The company cancelled its fall series of productions. The company appealed their loss of grant and had to attend a hearing to justify re-instating it.

By this time, the company had an accumulated deficit of CA$127,000 (equivalent to $1,271,549 in 2025) and was not willing to go down without a fight. The Council released its reasoning for the withdrawal, noting the accumulated deficit and that the foundation only sought CA$25,000 in private donations against a budget of CA$309,000 (equivalent to $3,093,768 in 2025), the average audience capacity was only 44%, and the last two productions only served an average of 19%. Also, the Council, from published critical reviews that "many of the Crest productions are considered to be indifferent and have not recently provided the standard of theatre which Toronto might now expect." Toronto Star critic Nathan Cohen, who had been openly antagonistic to the company, applauded the decision, calling it "entirely proper." In his opinion, in the last few years the company rarely provided more than one good production per season and its business was poorly run. It became front-page news in Toronto, as the Metro Toronto City Council had given the theatre a grant of CA$10,000 despite the fact the theatre was in financial trouble.

The Crest laid off all of its employees and other theatres could not pick up the plays or the employees. O'Keefe Centre manager Hugh Walker stood up for the Crest: "Some attractions might not have been up to standard, but the Crest used some 20 Canadian plays and is the only theatre in Canada giving opportunity to Canadian directors, playwrights and actors who would otherwise have to rely on television. They deserve a lot of credit for maintaining the standard they have ... operating on a shoestring".

A mediation hearing was held in September 1964 at the Park Plaza hotel with the Canada Council, Ontario Arts Council and the Crest board. Each witness was heard anonymously and confidentially. The Davises were not allowed in until several hours later, well after John Hirsch and Don Harron had appeared to support the theatre. Other witnesses did not support the theatre, and the appeal was denied.

The Davises pledged to re-open their theatre and began a fund-raising campaign, raising some CA$80,000 (equivalent to $800,976 in 2025), enough to re-open the theatre in the winter of 1965.

The Crest returned in January 1965 with the play A Severed Head. It had been a success in London, but failed in New York and was not a success, and the play selection was criticized for not being a commercial selection to capitalize on the good-will that was expressed in the fund-raising campaign. It was poorly received and was not popular.

The next play, however was popular. The Deputy directed by Murray Davis, starred Leo Ciceri, William Needles and Joseph Shaw. The Crest also performed the farce Oh Dad, Poor Dad, Mamma's Hung You in the Closet and I'm Feelin' So Sad with Eve Collyer, Heath Lamberts and Pat Armstrong, The Provoked Wife with Gerard Parkes and Nonnie Griffin, and the Canadian play Emmanuel Xoc with Jack Creley and William Bryden. Emmanuel Xoc was so poorly attended that it closed after one week; one week early.In May, the Crest put on Oh, What a Lovely War, which provided an anti-war message just as the USA was ramping up the Vietnam War. The play was a smash for the company, but stirred up attacks on the company. It, and Deputy helped the company's financial situation in a big way.

=== 1965-66 ===
The Canada Council for the Arts received negative publicity over the 1964 decision to deny the Crest and restored the CA$25,000 grant it had denied to the company, and gave it a CA$20,000 grant and the company was able to put on a full slate of plays through the fall and winter of 1966. It was justified as operations like the Crest were necessary to develop the talent for the upcoming Centennial year.

The fall season included a double-bill of The Private Ear and The Public Eye which was unsuccessful despite starring Frances Hyland, Tiny Alice by Edward Albee, which was also panned. Mr. Scrooge was produced just before Christmas, as a Christmas "treat", and was well-received.

January saw a Noël Coward play Hay Fever, and Durenmatt's The Physicist; both were unpopular. Artistic director Murray Davis submitted his resignation. The Crest continued with a good production of Tartuffe, followed by unpopular productions; the black comedy Poor Bitos and the final production, Ibsen's Hedda Gabler starring Marilyn Lightstone. The future of the company was uncertain, as the company had extensive debts and a large CA$30,000 deficit on the 1965-66 season.

Members of the theatre community, such as Douglas Campbell, openly speculated that the Crest had worn out its welcome in Toronto, and suggested it become a touring company. Richard Easton suggested that ten years was about the limit for a theatre company, citing the Group Theatre Company and the Mercury Theatre, both having only lasted ten years. Critic Nathan Cohen suggested that the company had two problems: the company had too much staff, and Murray Davis was unable to put together a commercially successful selection of plays. In his opinion, Donald Davis was the better artistic director, and the period under his leadership was the best period of the Crest's operation.

The summer would be spent trying to resolve the company's debts, attempt a merger with the Canadian Players, only to see those efforts fail.

== The venue ==
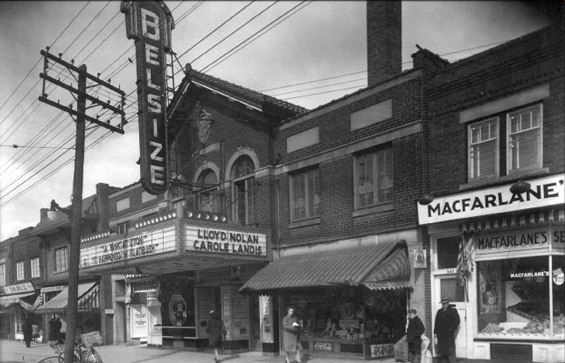
The Belsize in 1942

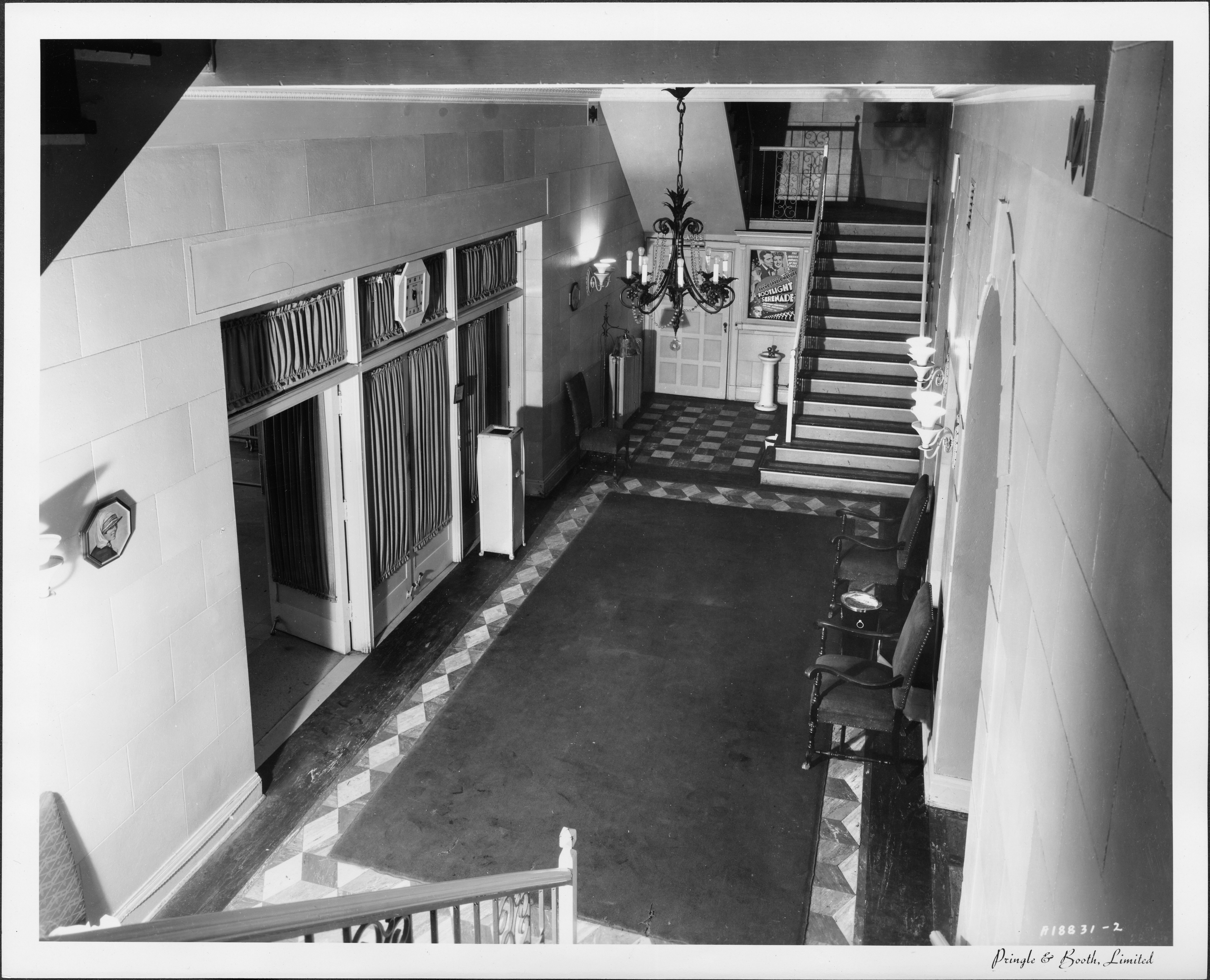
The lobby in 1942

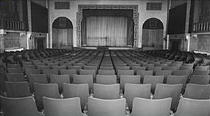
Interior in 1942

The theatre opened on March 17, 1927, as the Belsize Theatre for cinema as part of the chain of Famous Players Theatres. Seating 1,000, It was designed by Murray Brown, and built at a cost of CA$160,000 (equivalent to $2,887,033 in 2025). It was ceremonially opened by Toronto Mayor Foster. The interior was praised for "its fine arcade entrance", "Venetian mirrors" and friezes of "Carmen, the Spanish dancer, adorn the walls on each side, these pictures costing CA$1,200 each." The first film shown was It starring Clara Bow.

The theatre continued to show movies until the end of 1953. In 1950, it was renovated and its name was changed to the Crest Theatre. It re-opened on August 3, 1950, now part of the '20th Century Theatres' chain.

In 1953, the Davis brothers renovated the theatre for live performances, reducing the capacity to 822 seats, keeping the name for their theatre company. After the live theatre closed, the building again showed films, and showed repertory films from 1971 onwards. In 1988, it was renovated, renamed the Regent Theatre, and started showing first-run films again for Famous Players. It operated as a cinema until 2020, when it was purchased to return it to a live theatre space.
