= Powys Thomas =

British actor (1925–1977)

Powys Thomas (31 December 1925 – 22 June 1977) was a British-born actor who played an important role in the development of theatre in Canada.

== History ==
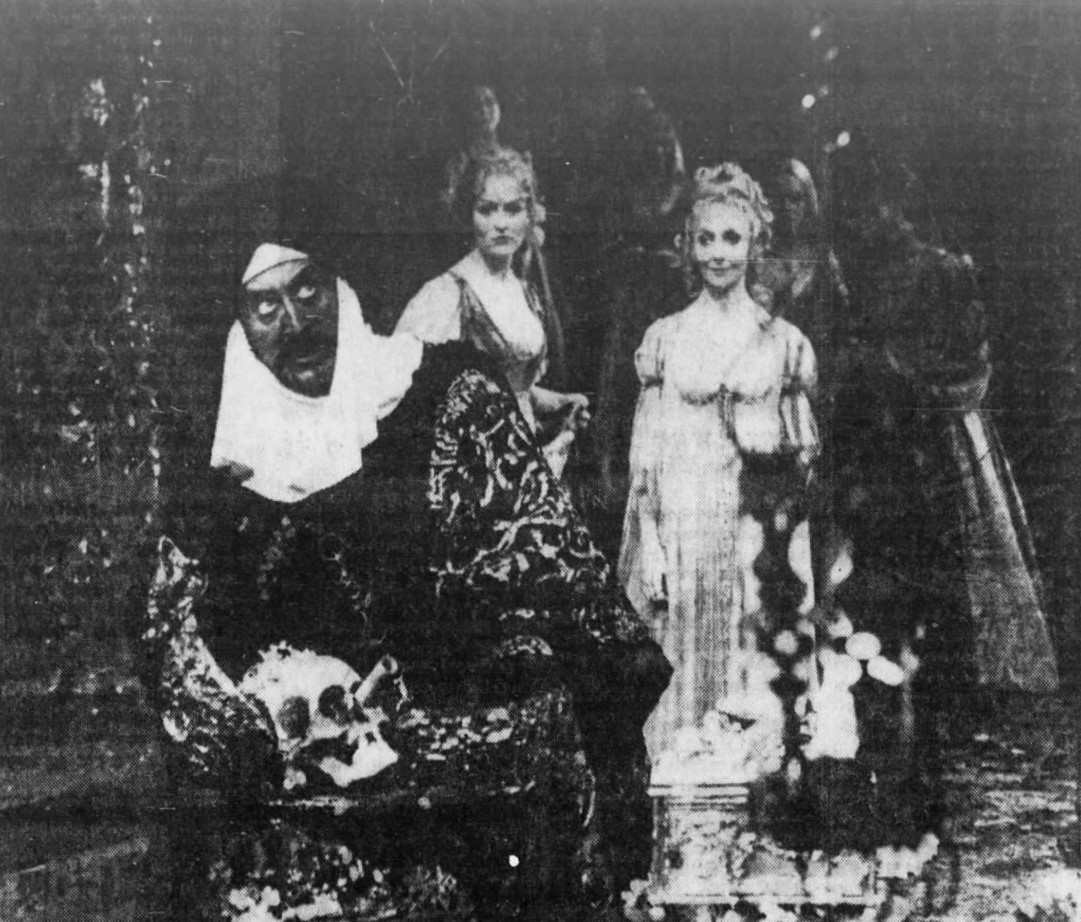
Thomas as the Prince of Morocco in a 1970 production of The Merchant of Venice at the Stratford Festival, alongside Maureen O'Brien (right)

Thomas was born in Cwmbach, Glamorgan, Wales in December 1925, to William Bryn and Mary Olinda Thomas. He went to the Mountain School, Port Talbot from 1930 to 1938, and to Rendcomb College, Cirencester, Gloucestershire from 1939 to 1944. He was known there as Willie. He was a leading light in the school's many theatrical ventures. He left Rendcomb in 1944 with a history scholarship to Queens' College, Cambridge. Soon thereafter he was called up as a Bevin Boy (coal miner apprentice) to serve as a coal miner in Wales for the duration of World War II. He studied at the Bristol Old Vic Theatre School from 1947 to 1948. He was a member of the Royal Shakespeare Company at Stratford-upon-Avon from 1951 to 1956. Thomas went to Canada in 1956 and worked for the Canadian Broadcasting Corporation. He was one of the first actors at the Stratford Shakespeare Festival in Ontario and was the first director for the actors' workshops there. With Michel Saint-Denis, he founded the National Theatre School of Canada in 1960 and was artistic director for the English section until 1965. Thomas also founded the Vancouver Playhouse school.

Thomas gave memorable performances in King Lear in Vancouver, The Three Musketeers, Waiting for Godot and Lorenzaccio at Stratford (Ontario) and in Three Sisters in Winnipeg.

Thomas can be seen as Hudson in "The Last Voyage of Henry Hudson" a role to which he gives Shakespearean dimensions, black and white (Educational Film Board of Canada) on YouTube.

== Family ==
Thomas married actress Ann Morrish in July 1951. They had three children, and were divorced in 1968.

== Death ==
Thomas died suddenly during a holiday in Wales on 22 June 1977, at the age of 51.
