= Donald Davis (actor) =

Canadian actor (1928–1998)

- Davis in 1960
- Born: February 26, 1928; Newmarket, Ontario, Canada
- Died: January 23, 1998 (aged 69); Toronto, Ontario, Canada
- Occupations: Actor, director, producer
- Years active: 1947–1998

Donald George Davis (February 26, 1928 – January 23, 1998) was a Canadian film and theatre actor, theatre director and theatre producer. He was a founder of the Crest Theatre in Toronto, which pioneered Canadian actors, directors and plays.

== Early life ==
He was born in Newmarket, Ontario, where his grandfather Elihu James Davis (and his uncle, Aubrey Davis) owned the Davis Leather Company. He attended St. Andrew's College from 1941 to 1946, graduating with the Class of 1946, and studied theatre at the University of Toronto. In 1947, he performed in Robert Gills' first Hart House Theatre production, Saint Joan.

== Professional career ==
Davis made his professional debut at the Woodstock Playhouse in New York in 1947 in The Barretts of Wimpole Street. In 1948, with his brother, Murray Davis, he founded a summer theatre company, the Straw Hat Players, at Muskoka, Ontario. Davis performed in Britain from 1950 to 1953 with the Glasgow Citizens' Theatre and the Bristol Old Vic.

In 1953, with his brother Murray and sister Barbara, he co-founded the Crest Theatre in Toronto, which operated until 1966. As well as acting at the Crest, he also directed several plays. He performed at the Stratford Festival in 1954, 1955, 1956, 1969 and 1970. He also acted on radio and television for the CBC.

In 1959, he left Canada to act in the United States. In 1959, he began performing off-Broadway. He played Krapp in the North American premiere production of Samuel Beckett's Krapp's Last Tape, for which he won an Obie Award. and he repeated the role at the Crest. This was the first in a series of roles in plays by Beckett and directed by Alan Schneider, and Davis was considered a foremost interpreter of Beckett.

In the United States, Davis performed in many regional theatres, including City Centre Theatre in New York, Provincetown Playhouse, American Shakespeare Festival, New York's Mermaid Theatre and Chicago's Goodman Theatre. He also appeared on US television. Davis appeared in "The Wild Wild West", season 3, episode 18 "The Night of the Vipers" as the scheming Mayor Vance Beaumont. The episode aired on January 10, 1968. Davis would perform again in New York in a performance of Beckett Plays in 1983, directed by Schneider.

In 1971, Davis returned to Canada. He performed at Festival Lennoxville, in Toronto at the St. Lawrence Centre for the Arts with Toronto Arts Productions, CentreStage and Theatre Plusin Toronto, and the Neptune Theatre in Halifax. He also appeared in several Canadian films.

Davis directed theatre also, first with the Straw Hat Players, Festival Lennoxville, the Shaw Festival, Edmonton's Citadel Theatre and Ottawa's National Arts Centre.

== Death ==
Davis in 1984

Davis died of emphysema at Toronto in 1998 at age 69. St. Andrew's College opened the Donald Davis Theatre posthumously in his honour.

== Selected filmography ==
- Joy in the Morning (1965)
- Samuel Lount (1985)
- And Then You Die (1987)

== Crest performances ==
- The Light of Heart (1954)
- Lord Arthur Savile's Crime (1954)
- Miss Julie (1954)
- Murder in the Cathedral (1954)
- Dream Girl (1954)
- Haste to the Wedding (1954)
- A Jig for the Gypsy (1954)
- The Living Room (1954)
- The Confidential Clerk (1954)
- Christmas in the Marketplace (1954, 1955)
- Twelfth Night (1955)
- The Biggest Thief in Town (1955)
- Marching Song (1955)
- Meeting at Night (1955)
- When We Are Married (1955)
- Hunting Stuart (1955)
- Come Back Little Sheba (1956)
- Antigone (1956)
- The Three Sisters (1956)
- Antony and Cleopatra (1956)
- Village Wooing (1956)
- The Glass Cage (1957)
- The Cherry Orchard (1958)
- Double Image (1958)
- Krapp's Last Tape (1961)
