= Festival (Canadian TV series) season 2 =

Festival
- Season 2
- No. of episodes: 25

Release
- Original network: CBC
- Original release: 2 October 1961 – 11 June 1962

Season chronology
- ← Previous; Season 1 Next → Season 3

The second season of the Canadian television anthology series Festival broadcast on CBC Television from 2 October 1961 to 11 June 1962. Twenty-five new episodes aired this season.

== Synopsis ==
Classical plays for season two include Webster's macabre tragedy The Duchess of Malfi (1614), and CBC's 1961 teleplay of Macbeth featuring Zoe Caldwell as Lady Macbeth, and Sean Connery as Macbeth in his only Shakespearean lead role. Originally adapted and directed by Paul Almond and broadcast in five parts for senior high school students, it was edited into a single presentation and aired on Festival in April 1962.

Operas included Bizet's 1875 opéra comique four-act Carmen featuring mezzo-soprano Belén Amparan, who had performed the role of Carmen for The Met in 1958 and 1960. Gilbert and Sullivan's 1879 comedy The Pirates of Penzance was also presented in full. In another episode, "An Evening with Gilbert and Sullivan", the Stratford Light Opera performed portions of Pirates, The Mikado (1885), The Yeoman of the Guard (1888), and the full version of Trial By Jury (1875).

Tribute is paid to Igor Stravinsky, celebrating his 80th birthday and he conducts the CBC Symphony Orchestra performing Symphony of Psalms with the Festival Singers of Canada. Robert Craft conducts Stravinsky's ballets Petrouchka, Agon, and Apollo with the New York City Ballet. Tchaikovsky's 1877 ballet Swan Lake is performed by the National Ballet of Canada. Eugene Ormandy conducts the Philadelphia Symphony Orchestra with pianist John Browning in works by American composers, Leonard Bernstein, Aaron Copland, Henry Cowell, Edward MacDowell, Roger Sessions, and John Philip Sousa. Ed McCurdy performs Nova Scotian folk songs.

The bulk of season two presented modern and contemporary works. Early-modern plays included Shaw's satire The Apple Cart: A Political Extravaganza (1928), Maxwell Anderson's 1930 Broadway drama Elizabeth the Queen, and Jean Anouilh's five-scene Le Voyageur sans bagage ("The Traveller without Luggage", 1937). Works from the 1940s and 50s included Alvin Goldman's adaptation of Ugo Betti's La regina e lgli insorti ("The Queen and the Rebels", 1949), Christopher Fry's romantic comedy The Lady's Not for Burning (1948) and his verse play A Sleep of Prisoners (1951), Dorothy Wright's three-act nativity play A Cradle of Willow (1952), and Canadian radio host Jacques Languirand's Les Grands Départs ("Grand Exits", 1957). Gratien Gélinas both wrote and acted in his play Bousille et les Justes ("Bousille and the Just", 1959). Contemporary plays included two from Harold Pinter, his tragicomic A Slight Ache (1958) and his couples comedy The Collection (1961), Bernard Kops's 1960 play The Dream of Peter Mann, Hugh Webster's adaptation of Marghanita Laski's drama The Offshore Island, set following a nuclear war, and Ron Boorne's office politics drama The Day of the Dodo. Tommy Tweed adapted his own radio play, The Brass Pounder from Illinois, about the construction of the Canadian Pacific Railway under William Van Horne, as portrayed by John Drainie. It was produced with technical help from the Canadian Pacific Railway. Literary adaptations included Giraudoux's 1938 drama Ondine based on Fouqué's fairy tale novella Undine (1811), and James Agee adapts Stephen Crane's short story The Blue Hotel (1898).

== Notable guest cast ==
- Sharon Acker
- Bernard Behrens
- Lloyd Bochner
- Nadia Boulanger
- John Browning
- Ruth Budd
- Avis Bunnage
- Zoe Caldwell
- Douglas Campbell
- Barbara Chilcott
- Robert Christie
- Eric Christmas
- Sean Connery
- Robert Craft
- Jacques D'Amboise
- Howard da Silva
- Donald Davis
- James Doohan
- Peter Donat
- John Drainie
- Judith Evelyn
- Timothy Findley
- Ted Follows
- Celia Franca
- Claire Gagnier
- Robin Gammell
- Gratien Gélinas
- Bruno Gerussi
- Howell Glynne
- Frank Guarrera
- Rex Hagon
- Don Harron
- Melissa Hayden
- Eric House
- William Hutt
- Frances Hyland
- John Kastner
- Charmion King
- Cosette Lee
- Jane Mallett
- Larry D. Mann
- Murray Matheson
- Hedley Mattingly
- Patricia McBride
- Neil McCallum
- Ed McCurdy
- Ed McNamara
- Arthur Mitchell
- Mavor Moore
- Otto-Werner Mueller
- William Needles
- Eugene Ormandy
- Gordon Pinsent
- Douglas Rain
- Kate Reid
- Norma Renault
- Toby Robins
- Louis Roney
- Alexander Schneider
- Lois Smith
- Grant Strate
- Igor Stravinsky
- Marion Studholme
- Toby Tarnow
- Powys Thomas
- Huguette Tourangeau
- Tony Van Bridge
- John Vernon
- Alexander Webster
- Hugh Webster
- Murray Westgate
- Kathleen Widdoes
- Chris Wiggins
- Jeremy Wilkin

== Episodes ==
Notes:

- Beginning this season, the program was no longer billed as Festival '61, but simply as Festival.
- Most of the weeks in which Festival did not air, programming was pre-empted by special episodes of Camera Canada.
- "The Offshore Island" which aired the week of 12 March 1962, re-aired later in the season on 14 May 1962.
- The week of 2 April 1962 was a repeat of "The Luck of Ginger Coffey" that originally aired the week of 19 June 1961 in season one.

No. overall	No. in season	Title	Directed by	Written by	Original release date	Ref.
26	1	"The Pirates of Penzance"	Norman Campbell	Gilbert and Sullivan	2 October 1961	
Please add a Plot Summary here, replacing this text. For guidance, see How to write a plot summary. Episode summaries must be expressed in your own words. Do NOT submit content you find from another web site as it is plagiarism and likely a copyright violation, which Wikipedia cannot accept and will be removed or reverted. Superficially modifying copyrighted content or closely paraphrasing it, even if the source is cited, still constitutes a copyright violation. As per Television Plot Manual of Style,^{MOS:TVPLOT} summaries should be about 100 to 200 words in length, and those substantially less than 100 words are most likely to be scrutinized for possible copyright violation. Notes: Performed by the Stratford Festival. Recorded in Toronto. Cast: Eric House (Major General), Marion Studholme (Mabel Stanley), Andrew Downie (Frederic), Harry Mossfield (Pirate King), Irene Byatt (Ruth), Howell Glynne (Sergeant of Police), Alexander Gray, Marie Gauley, Darlene Hirst, and Genevieve Gordon.
27	2	"Ondine"	Harvey Hart	Jean Giraudoux	9 October 1961	
Please add a Plot Summary here, replacing this text. For guidance, see How to write a plot summary and Television Plot Manual of Style.^{MOS:TVPLOT} Cast: Kathleen Widdoes (Ondine), Jeremy Wilkin (Ritter Hans), Sharon Acker (Princess Bertha), William Hutt (The Old One), Jane Mallett (Eugenie), Larry Mann (The First Judge), Chris Wiggins (Auguste), Joseph Shaw (The Chamberlain), Timothy Findley (Bertram), Hugh Webster (The King), Drew Thompson (The Second Judge), Gerardine Douglas, Joan Maroney, Charlotte de Neve (The Three Ondines).
28	3	"The Dream of Peter Mann"	Eric Till	Bernard Kops	16 October 1961	
29	4	"Land of the Old Song"	Unknown	Traditionals	23 October 1961	
Ed McCurdy performs Nova Scotian folk songs.
30	5	"The Blue Hotel"	Harvey Hart	Play by : Stephen Crane; Adapted by : James Agee	6 November 1961	
Please add a Plot Summary here, replacing this text. For guidance, see How to write a plot summary and Television Plot Manual of Style.^{MOS:TVPLOT} Cast: Howard da Silva, Michael Forest, Jonathan White, Eric Christmas, Sean Sullivan, Gordon Pinsent, Alexander Webster and Elizabeth Cole.
31	6	"Carmen"	Irving Guttman	Georges Bizet	20 November 1961	
Please add a Plot Summary here, replacing this text. For guidance, see How to write a plot summary and Television Plot Manual of Style.^{MOS:TVPLOT} Cast: Features Belen Amparan from the Metropolitan Opera as Carmen, Louis Roney (Don Jose), Frank Guarrera (Escamillo), Claire Gagnier (Micaela), Yoland Guerard (Zuniga), Napoleon Bisson (Morales), Lucile Dansereau (Frasquita), Huguette Tourangeau (Mercedes), Andre Lortie (Remendado), and Claude LeTourneau (Dancairo). Notes: Duration: 2 hours. This production was first telecast on the CBC French series L'Heure du concert. Produced by Jean-Yves Landry. Otto-Werner Mueller (conductor), Irving Guttman (stage director).
32	7	"A Sleep of Prisoners"	Paul Almond	Christopher Fry	27 November 1961	
Please add a Plot Summary here, replacing this text. For guidance, see How to write a plot summary and Television Plot Manual of Style.^{MOS:TVPLOT} Cast: Douglas Rain (David King), John Drainie (Tim Meadows), Dino Narizzano (Peter Able), and Peter Needham (Corporal Joe Adams)
33	8	"Swan Lake"	Norman Campbell	Pyotr Ilyich Tchaikovsky	18 December 1961	
The National Ballet of Canada performs Tchaikovsky's 1877 ballet Swan Lake, in which, according to Russian and German folk lore, the beautiful princess Odette was turned into a swan by a spell from the evil sorcerer, Von Rothbart. Only love can lift the curse, transforming the Swan Queen and her swan companions back to human form. Cast: Lois Smith (Odette/Odile), David Adams (Prince Siegfried), Yves Cousineau (Von Rothbart), Celia Franca (Queen Mother), Grant Strate, Jacqueline Ivings, and Jocelyn Terelle. Notes: Musical director, George Crum.
34	9	"A Cradle of Willow"	Eric Till	Dorothy Wright	25 December 1961	
Please add a Plot Summary here, replacing this text. For guidance, see How to write a plot summary and Television Plot Manual of Style.^{MOS:TVPLOT} Genre: Christmas drama. Cast: Dino Narizzano, Leo Ciceri, Eric Christmas, Tony Van Bridge, Geoffrey Alexander, Toby Tarnow, Moya Fenwick, and Hilary Vernon.
35	10	"The Traveller Without Luggage"	Mario Prizek	Jean Anouilh	1 January 1962	
Please add a Plot Summary here, replacing this text. For guidance, see How to write a plot summary and Television Plot Manual of Style.^{MOS:TVPLOT} Cast: Geoffrey Alexander, James Douglas, Jane Mallett, Norma Renault, Mary Savidge.
36	11	"The Day of the Dodo"	George McCowan	Ron Boorne	8 January 1962	
Aircraft designers experience dramatic office politics during an aeronautical project. Cast: John Drainie, Bruno Gerussi, William Needles, Kate Reid, Norman Welsh.
37	12	"The Lady's Not for Burning"	Paul Almond	Christopher Fry	15 January 1962	
Please add a Plot Summary here, replacing this text. For guidance, see How to write a plot summary and Television Plot Manual of Style.^{MOS:TVPLOT} Cast: Zoe Caldwell (Jennet Jourdemayne), Eric Christmas (Mayor Hebble Tyson), Donald Harron (Thomas Mendip), Mary Savidge (Margaret Devize). Notes: Produced by Paul Almond, costumes by Horst Daniz, sets by Rudi Dorn.
38	13	"An Evening with Gilbert and Sullivan"	Norman Campbell	Gilbert and Sullivan	22 January 1962	
The Stratford Light Opera, with conductor Godfrey Ridout, performs portions of Gilbert and Sullivan's comedic operas. Excerpts include The Pirates of Penzance (1879), The Mikado (1885), in which Annabelle Adams, Marie Gauley and Genevieve Gordon sing Three Little Maids from School Are We, and The Yeomen of the Guard (1888), in which contralto Irene Byatt, as Dame Garruthers, sings When our gallant Norman Foes. The full version of Trial By Jury (1875) is also performed. Cast: Douglas Campbell (W. S. Gilbert's ghost), Eric Christmas (Sir Arthur Sullivan's ghost), Eric House, Marion Studholme, Andrew Downie, Harry Mossfield, and Howell Glynne.
39	14	"The Queen and the Rebels"	Harvey Hart	Play by : Ugo Betti; Translated by : Henry Reed; Adapted by : Alvin Goldman	5 February 1962	
Victorious rebels mistake a prostitute for a queen. In time, she acquiesces to be queen, but at the cost of her life. Cast: Don Harron, Barbara Chilcott, Charmion King, Jeremy Wilkin, Mavor Moore, Bernard Behrens, Tom Harvey and Larry Zahab.
40	15	"Elizabeth the Queen"	Unknown	Maxwell Anderson	12 February 1962	
Please add a Plot Summary here, replacing this text. For guidance, see How to write a plot summary and Television Plot Manual of Style.^{MOS:TVPLOT} Genre: Historical drama. Cast: Judith Evelyn (Elizabeth the Queen), Leo Ciceri, Donald Davis (Sir Walter Raleigh), Peter Donat, Douglas Rain (Courier), Eric Christmas, Pat Galloway, William Needles, Gillie Fenwick, Max Helpmann, and Peter Needham.
41	16	"Bousille and the Just"	Mario Prizek	Gratien Gélinas	26 February 1962	
Please add a Plot Summary here, replacing this text. For guidance, see How to write a plot summary and Television Plot Manual of Style.^{MOS:TVPLOT} Genre: Historical drama. Cast: Gratien Gélinas, Larry D. Mann (Phil), James Doohan, Charmion King, Jill Foster, Cosette Lee, Robert Christie, Victoria Mitchell, Jonathan White, and John Grima.
42	17	"The Apple Cart"	David Gardner	George Bernard Shaw	5 March 1962	
Please add a Plot Summary here, replacing this text. For guidance, see How to write a plot summary and Television Plot Manual of Style.^{MOS:TVPLOT} Cast: Murray Matheson (King Magnus), Zoe Caldwell (Orinthia), Tony Van Bridge, Norman Welsh, Mary Savidge, Gillie Fenwick, Christopher Wiggins, Murray Westgate, Susan Fletcher, and Dawn Greenhalgh.
43	18	"The Offshore Island"	Eric Till	Play by : Marghanita Laski; Adapted by : Hugh Webster	12 March 1962	
Please add a Plot Summary here, replacing this text. For guidance, see How to write a plot summary and Television Plot Manual of Style.^{MOS:TVPLOT} Genre: Drama. Subject: Post-nuclear war. Cast: Irene Worth (Rachel Verney), William Hutt (Captain Charles), Tony Van Bridge (Martin), Janet Reid (Mary Verney), James Barron (Sgt. Bayford), Bernard Behrens (Capt. Baltinsky), and John Kastner (James Verney).
44	19	"The Duchess of Malfi"	Mario Prizek	John Webster	19 March 1962	
Please add a Plot Summary here, replacing this text. For guidance, see How to write a plot summary and Television Plot Manual of Style.^{MOS:TVPLOT} Cast: Frances Hyland (Duchess of Malfi), Douglas Rain (Bosola), Powys Thomas, John Vernon (Antonio), Leo Ciceri, Lloyd Bochner, and Mary Savidge.
45	20	"Grand Exits"	Mario Prizek	Play by : Jacques Languirand; Translated by : Ivor Barry	16 April 1962	
Please add a Plot Summary here, replacing this text. For guidance, see How to write a plot summary and Television Plot Manual of Style.^{MOS:TVPLOT} Cast: Frances Hyland, John Drainie, Norma Renault, Robert Christie, Toby Tarnow, and Alex McKee.
46	21	"Macbeth"	Paul Almond	William Shakespeare	23 April 1962	
CBC's 1961 teleplay of Shakespeare's Macbeth featuring Sean Connery as Macbeth and Zoe Caldwell as Lady Macbeth. Cast: Full list. Notes: Originally produced by Paul Almond as a five-part series for senior high school students, it was broadcast in 1961 on 30 November and on the 5th, 7th, 12th, and 14th of December. The five parts were later combined, edited, and re-broadcast in this single ninety-minute presentation. Production Design: Rudi Dorn. Costumes: Horst Dantz.
47	22	"The Brass Pounder from Illinois"	George McCowan	Tommy Tweed	7 May 1962	
Please add a Plot Summary here, replacing this text. For guidance, see How to write a plot summary and Television Plot Manual of Style.^{MOS:TVPLOT} Subject: Construction of the Canadian Pacific Railway under William Van Horne. Cast: John Drainie, Joseph Shaw, Robert Christie, Tom Harvey, Larry Mann, John Vernon, Frank Perry, Ed McNamara, Andrew Allan, and Joe Austin. Notes: A Biased Biography of William Cornelius Van Horne by Tommy Tweed.
48	23	"Eugene Ormandy Conducts"	Unknown	Unknown	21 May 1962	
Eugene Ormandy conducts a one-hour concert with the Philadelphia Symphony Orchestra and guests artists including American pianist John Browning performing works by American composers, Leonard Bernstein, Aaron Copland, Henry Cowell, Edward MacDowell, Roger Sessions, and John Philip Sousa.
49	24	"The Collection" "A Slight Ache"	Paul Almond	Harold Pinter	4 June 1962	
50	25	"Stravinsky at 80"	Franz Kraemer	Music by : Igor Stravinsky; Choreography by : George Balanchine; Teleplay by : Ronald Hambleton	11 June 1962	
Igor Stravinsky's 80th birthday is celebrated with a look back at his compositions and life as a pupil of Rimsky-Korsakov in Russia, his association with Sergei Diaghilev and the Ballets Russes in France, friendship with Pablo Picaso and other greats of the time, with narration by Robert Craft. Stravinsky conducts an informal rehearsal of L'Histoire du soldat, and the CBC Symphony Orchestra in a performance of his Symphony of Psalms with the Festival Singers of Toronto. Craft also conducts CBC Symphony Orchestra performing the Russian Dance from Stravinsky's 1911 ballet Petrouchka, and two ballets choreographed by George Balanchine, Agon and Apollo, danced by members of Balanchine's New York City Ballet; Melissa Hayden, Jacques D'Amboise, Patricia McBride and Arthur Mitchell. The program includes appearances by musicologist Nadia Boulanger and musicians Alexander Schneider (violin), Stanley McCartney (clarinet), Nicholas Kilburn (bassoon), Joseph Umbrico (trumpet), Ted Roderman (trombone), Ruth Budd (double bass) and Vair Capper (percussion). Notes: Tribute conceived by CBC music consultant and Canadian film score composer Louis Applebaum. Produced by Franz Kraemer. Recorded in Toronto.

Previous: Season 1	List of Festival episodes	Succeeded by Season 3
