= Festival (Canadian TV series) season 3 =

Festival
- Season 3
- No. of episodes: 25

Release
- Original network: CBC
- Original release: 1 October 1962 – 20 May 1963

Season chronology
- ← Previous; Season 2 Next → Season 4

The third season of the Canadian television anthology series Festival broadcast on CBC Television from 1 October 1962 to 20 May 1963. Twenty-five new episodes aired this season.

== Synopsis ==
Season three presented a balance of music, dance, opera, and plays.

The CBC Symphony Orchestra performs Beethoven's 7th symphony, conducted by Karl Böhm, and viewers are taken behind the scenes for the "birth of a symphony" by Russian conductor Igor Stravinsky with commentary by Helmut Blume. Pianist Malcolm Frager and opera singers Pierrette Alarie and Léopold Simoneau perform Mozart. Soprano Lois Marshall, with pianist Glenn Gould and violinist Oscar Shumsky, present works by Richard Strauss. Gould also hosts an episode with piano, SATB vocals, and string quartet performances, including a madrigal by Luca Marenzio, two Bach fugues, a Mozart adagio and fugue, piano sonatas by Beethoven and Hindemith, and Gould's own composition, So You Want to Write a Fugue. Modern music is hosted by composer Harry Somers and performed by Canada's top jazz musicians, pianist Norm Amadio, trumpeter Guido Basso, guitarist Ed Bickert, cornetist Trump Davidson and his Dixieland group, composer/trumpeter Gordon Delamont, singer Don Francks, Ed Karam and his Big Band, trombonist Rob McConnell, tenor saxophonist Rick Wilkins, and composer Norm Symonds. Film historian Tony Thomas narrated as four composers presented their film music, performed by the CBC Symphony Orchestra. The episode included William Walton's compositions from two films, the historical Henry V (1944) and the British biographic The First of the Few, known in America as Spitfire (1942), and two films featuring Louis Applebaum's music in Action Stations and A Round is a Round. Aaron Copland composed for Something Wild, a 1961 neo-noir psychological thriller, and David Raksin for the 1962 drama Two Weeks in Another Town.

Opera programming includes players from the Avon Theatre, a Stratford Festival venue, and an 18-voice chorus before a live studio audience in a theatrical performance of Gilbert and Sullivan's 1889 comedic opera The Gondoliers, with music by the National Festival Orchestra conducted by Louis Applebaum. Another episode features a 54-voice chorus production of Verdi's four-act penultimate opera Otello (1887), based on Shakespeare's play Othello (ca. 1603), conducted by music director Ernesto Barbini. For dance programming, Barry Morse presents the 1841 romantic ballet-pantomime fairy tale, Giselle performed by the National Ballet of Canada, from which, Ugandan founding member Angela Leigh portrays the Queen of the Wilis, Russian ballerina Galina Samsova plays her vassal wilis, Canadian-American ballerina Sally Brayley plays Bathilde, and Canadian ballerina Lois Smith plays the title role, Giselle. The Ximenez-Vargas Ballet Company of Spain performs Spanish folk music and dances from 18th century Andalusia, featuring flamenco dancer Maria Alba, and singer Chinin de Triana. One sacred work is presented, Laudes Evanglii, a Choreographic Pageant in Seven Scenes. Giorgio Signorini wrote the libretto based on the Latin liturgical play, Laudes Dramaticae Umbriae about the life of Christ, with music by Valentino Bucchi, and choreography by Léonide Massine. Filmed in London (1961), participants included Ballet European, the chorus of the Glyndebourne Festival Opera, soloists and mimes.

Plays include Henrik Ibsen's drama The Wild Duck (1884) adapted by Alvin Goldman, and George Bernard Shaw's 1906 problem play The Doctor's Dilemma. From the 1940s to 50s, Festival presented Bertolt Brecht's epic Life of Galileo (1943), adapted by Lister Sinclair, Alvin Goldman's adaption of Ugo Betti's 1950 morality play The Gambler (1950), Christopher Fry's 1950 blank verse play Venus Observed, Jean Anouilh's 1952 Joan of Arc play The Lark adapted by Lillian Hellman, and John Arden's 1959 Serjeant Musgrave's Dance, An Un-historical Parable. Edward Albee is interviewed by Charles Templeton between the presentations of his two plays, the off-Broadway satire The American Dream (1961), and his one-act The Sandbox (1959). Jean-Robert Remillard's The Endless Echo is an Orpheus and Eurydice story transposed to rural Quebec in the 1940s, translated by Alvin Goldman. Anthony Terpiloff's satire Ivan is about a USSR poet, alluding to Yevgeny Yevtushenko, being threatened by the "Official Writer's Union" and denied a passport. Other plays include Jack Pulman's drama A Book with Chapters in It, W. O. Mitchell's The Devil's Instrument, Helge Krog's psychological Break-Up, and M. Charles Cohen's original play for television David, Chapter II.

== Notable guest cast ==
- Sharon Acker
- Pierrette Alarie
- Edward Albee
- Norm Amadio
- Louis Applebaum
- Ivor Barry
- Guido Basso
- Bernard Behrens
- Ed Bickert
- Len Birman
- Mervyn Blake
- Karl Böhm
- Victor Braun
- Sally Brayley
- Zoe Caldwell
- Douglas Campbell
- Richard Cassilly
- Ann Casson
- Barbara Chilcott
- Dinah Christie
- Robert Christie
- John Colicos
- Patricia Collins
- Jack Creley
- Trump Davidson
- Gordon Delamont
- Peter Donat
- John Drainie
- Ted Follows
- Malcolm Frager
- Don Francks
- Leo Genn
- Glenn Gould
- Bruno Gerussi
- Martha Henry
- William Hutt
- Moe Koffman
- Heath Lamberts
- Diana Leblanc
- Cosette Lee
- Angela Leigh
- Lois Marshall
- Elizabeth Mawson
- Howard Mawson
- John McCollum
- Rob McConnell
- Mavor Moore
- William Needles
- Louis Negin
- Christopher Newton
- Leslie Nielsen
- Gerard Parkes
- Gordon Pinsent
- Albert Pratz
- Dodi Protero
- Louis Quilico
- Douglas Rain
- Norma Renault
- Donnelly Rhodes
- Percy Rodriguez
- Jan Rubeš
- Galina Samsova
- Oscar Shumsky
- Léopold Simoneau
- Everett Sloane
- Lois Smith
- Harry Somers
- Ruth Springford
- Martin Stephens
- Igor Stravinsky
- Sydney Sturgess
- Toby Tarnow
- Charles Templeton
- Powys Thomas
- Tony Thomas
- Rip Torn
- Tony Van Bridge
- Laszlo Varga
- John Vernon
- Alexander Webster
- Hugh Webster
- Kathleen Widdoes
- Rick Wilkins
- Gordon Wry

== Episodes ==
Notes:

- Weeks not indicated were pre-empted by special broadcasts such as Camera Canada or The Telephone Hour.
- National election coverage pre-empted Festival on 8 April 1963.
- "A Cradle of Willow" that aired the week of 24 December 1962 is a repeat from season one, the week of 25 December 1961.
- "A Book with Chapters in It" aired twice this season, 8 October 1962 and 29 April 1963.
- "David, Chapter II" aired twice this season, 28 January 1963 and 20 May 1963.
- "Othello" ran 2 hours 15 minutes, compared to the usual 60-90 minutes. Therefore it was originally broadcast at 8:30 EST instead of 9:30.
- "Venus Observed" was originally scheduled for broadcast 7 January 1963, but delayed due to videotape erasure.

| No. overall | No. in season | Title | Directed by | Written by | Original release date | Ref. |
|---|---|---|---|---|---|---|
| 51 | 1 | "The Lark" | Harvey Hart | Play by : Jean Anouilh; Adapted by : Lillian Hellman | 1 October 1962 | |
Please add a Plot Summary here, replacing this text. For guidance, see How to write a plot summary. Episode summaries must be expressed in your own words. Do NOT submit content you find from another web site as it is plagiarism and likely a copyright violation, which Wikipedia cannot accept and will be removed or reverted. Superficially modifying copyrighted content or closely paraphrasing it, even if the source is cited, still constitutes a copyright violation. As per Television Plot Manual of Style,^{MOS:TVPLOT} summaries should be about 100 to 200 words in length, and those substantially less than 100 words are most likely to be scrutinized for possible copyright violation. Cast: Kathleen Widdoes, William Hutt, Douglas Rain, Bernard Behrens, Jonathan White, Len Birman, Tony Van Bridge, Jack Creley, Budd Knapp, Ron Hartmann, Mary Savidge, Gillie Fenwick, and Mervyn Blake.
| 52 | 2 | "A Book with Chapters in It" | Eric Till | Jack Pulman | 8 October 1962 | |
Please add a Plot Summary here, replacing this text. For guidance, see How to write a plot summary and Television Plot Manual of Style.^{MOS:TVPLOT} Cast: Tony Van Bridge, Gillie Fenwick, Diana Maddox, Raymond Wickens, Vernon Chapman, Betty Leighton, Martin Stephens.
| 53 | 3 | "Richard Strauss: A Personal View" | Mario Prizek | Richard Strauss | 15 October 1962 | |
Pianist Glenn Gould hosts "a view" into the music of German composer/conductor Richard Strauss with discussion and performances by Canadian soprano Lois Marshall and American violinist Oscar Shumsky, including the following. Cäcilie, Op. 27 No. 2 · Shumsky/Gould: Sonata in E♭ Major for Violin and Piano, Op. 18 · Marshall/Gould: Ophelia Lieder, Op. 67 (3 songs of Ophelia from Shakespeare's Hamlet: 1. "Wie erkenn' ich mein Treulieb?" 2. "Guten Morgen, 's ist Sankt Valentinstag" 3. "Sie trugen ihn auf der Bahre bloß") · Gould: three movements from the suite Der Bürger als Edelmann, Op. 60, with a 33-piece orchestra conducted by Shumsky · Four Last Songs: Beim Schlafengehen ("When Falling Asleep") for Voice and Piano (AV 150-3).
| 54 | 4 | "The Gambler" | Harvey Hart | Play by : Ugo Betti; Adapted by : Alvin Goldman | 29 October 1962 | |
In 1948 after World War II, aspects of guilt and past deeds are pondered through a dream by a man in Italy, wondering whether he is guilty for the murder of his wife. Cast: Rip Torn, Barbara Chilcott, Bud Knapp, Percy Rodriguez, Susan Chapple and Robert Christie.
| 55 | 5 | "The Devil's Instrument" | Eric Till | W. O. Mitchell | 5 November 1962 | |
Please add a Plot Summary here, replacing this text. For guidance, see How to write a plot summary and Television Plot Manual of Style.^{MOS:TVPLOT} Cast: Douglas Rain, John Drainie, Ron Hartmann, Robert Christie, Inge Bergman, Peter Mews, George Chow, Alice Hill, Alexander Webster, Arch McDonell, Jonathan White, Douglas Master, Dinah Christie, and William Osler.
| 56 | 6 | "Break-Up" | Mario Prizek | Helge Krog | 12 November 1962 | |
Please add a Plot Summary here, replacing this text. For guidance, see How to write a plot summary and Television Plot Manual of Style.^{MOS:TVPLOT} Cast: Barbara Chilcott, Leslie Nielsen, Leo Ciceri, Greia Munda, and John Tregale.
| 57 | 7 | "The Gondoliers" | Norman Campbell | Gilbert and Sullivan | 19 November 1962 | |
Please add a Plot Summary here, replacing this text. For guidance, see How to write a plot summary and Television Plot Manual of Style.^{MOS:TVPLOT} Cast: Douglas Campbell, Jack Creley, Ilona Kombrink, Ann Casson, John Arab, Victor Braun, Dodi Protero, Darlene Hirst, Alexander Gray, Elizabeth Mawson, Barbara Strathdee, Arlene Meadows, Elsie Sawchuk, Brian Crabb, William Copeland, Howard Mawson, and an 18-voice chorus with music by Louis Applebaum conducting the National Festival Orchestra. A Stratford Festival production.
| 58 | 8 | "Serjeant Musgrave's Dance" | Eric Till | John Arden | 26 November 1962 | |
Please add a Plot Summary here, replacing this text. For guidance, see How to write a plot summary and Television Plot Manual of Style.^{MOS:TVPLOT} Cast: Douglas Rain, Mervyn Blake, Ted Follows, Jonathan White, Gerard Parkes, Anne Butler, Mary Savidge, Bernard Behrens, Henry Comor, and Christopher Wiggins.
| 59 | 9 | "An Evening of Mozart" | Unknown | Wolfgang Amadeus Mozart | 3 December 1962 | |
Music with pianist Malcolm Frager and opera singers Pierrette Alarie and Léopold Simoneau.
| 60 | 10 | "Giselle" | Norman Campbell ^{TV} Celia Franca ^{Art} | Libretto by : Saint-Georges & Gautier; Music by : Adolphe Adam | 17 December 1962 | |
Host Barry Morse introduces, and George Crum conducts, the National Ballet of Canada's production of Giselle (1841). The ballet tells the tragic, romantic fairy tale of the beautiful young peasant Giselle who falls in love with a German nobleman, Duke Albrecht of Silesia, who has disguised himself as a peasant. When his rival, Hilarion, reveals Albrecht's true identity, Giselle goes mad and dies of a broken heart. Her spirit is summoned to join the vengeful Wilis, ghosts of unmarried women who died after similar betrayals. They take their revenge at night by dancing men to exhaustion and death. Myrtha, Queen of the Wilis, targets Albrecht, who mourns at Giselle's grave. The Wilis gain power in numbers, through dramatic, synchronized dance patterns, in an ethereal ambiance as they close in on Albrecht. But Giselle's love frees Albrecht from their spell, and saves herself from becoming one with the Sisterhood of the Wilis. Cast: Lois Smith (Giselle), Earl Kraul (Albrecht), Yves Cousineau (Hilarion), Judie Colpman, Angela Leigh (Queen of the Wilis), Sally Brayley (Bathilde), and Galina Samsova (Wilis).
| 61 | 11 | "Tongues of Brass" | Paddy Sampson | Unknown | 31 December 1962 | |
Composer Harry Somers hosts an informal jazz session with Canada's top jazz musicians, including Norm Amadio (piano), Guido Basso (trumpet), Ed Bickert (guitar), Trump Davidson and his Dixieland group, Don Francks (vocals), Ed Karam and his Big Band, Rob McConnell (trombone), and Rick Wilkins (tenor saxophone), with composers Norm Symonds and Gordon Delamont (trumpet). Songs performed include: Stay and See, Portrait of Mingus, jazz standard On the Sunny Side of the Street, and The Jazz Band Ball, an improvisation of Billie Holiday's 1942 single God Bless the Child and Jimmie Cox's 1923 blues standard Nobody Wants You When You're Down and Out. Produced by Paddy Sampson.
| 62 | 12 | "Music from the Films" | Norman Campbell | Tony Thomas | 21 January 1963 | |
Prepared by film critic Gerald Pratley, and narrated by Tony Thomas, four distinguished composers discuss scoring music for film, and conduct the CBC Symphony Orchestra from their own works, along with film clips and excerpts, such as Max Steiner's score for Gone with the Wind, and pianist Rudy Toth accompanying silent movie footage. Featured composers' films include: David Raksin: The Unicorn and The Garden (animated), Force of Evil (1948), The Bad and the Beautiful (1952), and Two Weeks in Another Town (1962) · Aaron Copland: the opening "Morning on the Ranch" for the film The Red Pony (1949), and Something Wild (1961) · Louis Applebaum: Action Stations (NFB documentary) and Norman McLaren's A Round is a Round · Sir William Walton: The Fugue from The First of the Few (1942, U.S. title: Spitfire) and Henry V (1944).
| 63 | 13 | "David, Chapter II" | Harvey Hart | M. Charles Cohen | 28 January 1963 | |
This play concerns a Jewish arts graduate in Winnipeg who attempts to decide his life's future direction. Cast: Donnelly Rhodes, Toby Tarnow, Lynne Gorman, Powys Thomas, George Sperdakos, and Heath Lamberts.
| 64 | 14 | "Ivan" | David Gardner | Anthony Terpiloff | 11 February 1963 | |
Please add a Plot Summary here, replacing this text. For guidance, see How to write a plot summary and Television Plot Manual of Style.^{MOS:TVPLOT} Cast: John Colicos, Mavor Moore, Gillie Fenwick, Paul Harding, Anna Reiser, Julie Rekai, Louis Negin, Patricia Collins, and Fred Euringer.
| 65 | 15 | "Venus Observed" | Paul Almond | Christopher Fry | 18 February 1963 | |
Please add a Plot Summary here, replacing this text. For guidance, see How to write a plot summary and Television Plot Manual of Style.^{MOS:TVPLOT} Genre: Comedy. Cast: David Dodimead, Martha Henry, Barbara Chilcott, Amelia Hall, Jill Showell, Eric Christmas, Tony Van Bridge, Donnelly Rhodes, and Edwin Stephenson.
| 66 | 16 | "The Wild Duck" | Harvey Hart | Play by : Henrik Ibsen; Translated by : Eva LaGallienne; Adapted by : Alvin Goldman | 25 February 1963 | |
Please add a Plot Summary here, replacing this text. For guidance, see How to write a plot summary and Television Plot Manual of Style.^{MOS:TVPLOT} Cast: Peter Donat, Norma Renault, Diana Leblanc, John Colicos, John Vernon, Robert Christie, Everett Sloane, and Hilary Vernon.
| 67 | 17 | "The Anatomy of Fugue" | Eric Till | Unknown | 4 March 1963 | |
The musical art of fugue is examined and presented by pianist Glenn Gould, with performances by The Canadian String Quartet, which include Albert Pratz (1st violin), Bernard Robbins (2nd violin), David Mankovitz (viola), and Laszlo Varga (cello), and by singers Lillian Smith-Weichel (soprano), Elizabeth Benson-Guy (soprano), Patricia Rideout (contralto), Gordon Wry (tenor), and Edgar Murdoch (bass). Victor Di Bello (Vocal Director). Performances include: 1. All five vocalist sing Luca Marenzio's madrigal Spring Returns; 2. Gould plays Johann Sebastian Bach's fugues from Book II of The Well-Tempered Clavier; Fugue No. 7 in E♭ Major, BWV 876 and Fugue No. 22 in B♭ minor, BWV 891; 3. The Canadian String Quartet performs Wolfgang Amadeus Mozart's Adagio and Fugue in C minor KV. 546; 4. Gould plays Ludwig van Beethoven's Piano Sonata No. 31 in A♭ Major, Op. 110 (Movements II & III); 5. Gould plays Paul Hindemith's Piano Sonata No. 3 in B♭ Major (last movement); 6. So You Want to Write a Fugue, Gould's composition, a fugue for four voices and string quartet, featuring Benson-Guy, Rideout, Wry, Murdoch, and the Canadian String Quartet.
| 68 | 18 | "The Endless Echo" | Mario Prizek | Play by : Jean-Robert Remillard; Translated by : Alvin Goldman | 11 March 1963 | |
Please add a Plot Summary here, replacing this text. For guidance, see How to write a plot summary and Television Plot Manual of Style.^{MOS:TVPLOT} Cast: Martha Henry, Len Birman, Sydney Sturgess, Beth Morris, Dinah Christie, William Osler, Kathy Kastner, and Kurt Schiegel.
| 69 | 19 | "The Doctor's Dilemma" | David Garner | George Bernard Shaw | 18 March 1963 | |
Please add a Plot Summary here, replacing this text. For guidance, see How to write a plot summary and Television Plot Manual of Style.^{MOS:TVPLOT} Cast: Leo Genn, Zoe Caldwell, Jennfier Dubedat, Peter Donat]], Gillie Fenwick, Ivor Barry, Joseph Shaw, Mervyn Blake, Louise Nicol, Maud Whitmore, and Vernon Chapman.
| 70 | 20 | "Galileo" | Mario Prizek | Play by : Bertolt Brecht; Adapted by : Lister Sinclair | 25 March 1963 | |
Please add a Plot Summary here, replacing this text. For guidance, see How to write a plot summary and Television Plot Manual of Style.^{MOS:TVPLOT} Cast: John Colicos (Galileo), Cosette Lee (Signora Sarti), William Needles (Priuli), Tony Van Bridge, John Vernon (Sagredo), Sharon Acker (Galileo's daughter), Robert Christie, Claude Bede, Douglas Rain, Bruno Gerussi (Little Monk), Leo Ciceri (Pope), Paul Harding, Gillie Fenwick (Cardinal Inquisitor), Gordon Pinsent, and Christopher Newton (Andrea). Narrated by Hugh Webster.
| 71 | 21 | "Birth of a Symphony" | Unknown | Ludwig van Beethoven | 1 April 1963 | |
Top conductors, Russian Igor Stravinsky and Austrian Karl Böhm, take viewers behind-the-scenes of an orchestral rehearsal, and how it leads to the "Birth of a Symphony." The Festival Singers of Toronto are featured. Helmut Blume introduces the performance, commenting how major musical works are born fresh each time a conductor raises his baton. Karl Böhm conducts a performance of Beethoven's 7th symphony by the CBC Symphony Orchestra.
| 72 | 22 | "Laudes Evanglii" | Joan Kemp-Welch | Libretto by : Giorgio Signorini; Music by : Valentino Bucchi; Choreography by : Léonide Massine | 15 April 1963 | |
A Miracle play and "Choreographic Pageant in Seven Scenes", the libretto was written by Giorgio Signorini, based on the Latin liturgical play, Laudes Dramaticae Umbriae, which portrays the Passion of Jesus Christ, from the Annunciation to the Ascension. It featured Ballet European choreographed by Léonide Massine, the chorus of the Glyndebourne Festival Opera, with soloists and mime performers, accompanied with music orchestrated by Valentino Bucchi. Notes: The play premiered at the basilica church of San Domenico, Perugia, Italy on 20 September 1952. This episode was filmed in London, produced by Associated-Rediffusion, and originally broadcast in the UK on 31 March 1961.
| 73 | 23 | "Othello" | Franz Kraemer | Play by : William Shakespeare; Opera by : Giuseppe Verdi | 22 April 1963 | |
Music director Ernesto Barbini conducts a 54-voice chorus in Giuseppe Verdi's penultimate opera Otello (1887), based on Shakespeare's play, The Tragedy of Othello, the Moor of Venice (ca. 1603), in which, machinations by the evil Iago, leverages Othello's jealous love for his wife, Desdemona, to bring about his destruction. Cast: Richard Cassilly (Othello), Ilona Kombrink (Desdemona), Louis Quilico (Iago), John McCollum (Cassio), Nasco Petroff (Roderigo), Jan Rubeš (Lodovico), Victor Braun (Montano), Elsie Sawchuk (Emilia), and William Copeland (Araldo). Notes: Duration, 135 minutes. The episode was re-aired in season three on 22 April 1964 in honor of Shakespeare's 400th birthday.
| 74 | 24 | "Ballet Espagnol" | Unknown | Unknown | 6 May 1963 | |
Roberto Ximenez and Manolo Vargas direct the Ximenez-Vargas Ballet Company of Spain, including flamenco dancer Maria Alba, flamenco singer Chinin de Triana, Emilio Bonnet (guitar), Juan Mejias (guitar), conductor Jean Deslauriers (violin), and musical director Carlos Rausch (piano), performing music and Spanish folk dances dating back to 18th-century Andalusia. Produced by Jean-Yves Landry, with set designs by Jean-Claude Rinfret, it was recorded in Montreal by CBC French-TV.
| 75 | 25 | "The American Dream" | Mario Prizek | Edward Albee | 13 May 1963 | |
| 75 | 25 | "The Sandbox" | Mario Prizek | Edward Albee | 13 May 1963 | |
Please add a Plot Summary here, replacing this text. For guidance, see How to write a plot summary and Television Plot Manual of Style.^{MOS:TVPLOT} Cast: Cosette Lee, Joe Austin, Ruth Springford, George Cooper, Frances Tobias, and Moe Koffman. Notes: Between the presentations of his two plays, Edward Albee is interviewed by Charles Templeton. Recorded in Toronto.

| Previous: Season 2 | List of Festival episodes | Succeeded by Season 4 |
