= Festival (Canadian TV series) season 1 =

Festival '61
- Season 1
- No. of episodes: 25

Release
- Original network: CBC
- Original release: 10 October 1960 – 19 June 1961

Season chronology
- ← Previous; None Next → Season 2

Originally called Festival '61, the inaugural season of the Canadian television anthology series Festival aired on CBC Television starting on 10 October 1960. Twenty-five episodes were produced and aired, not including four episodes produced by American broadcast corporations for the educational variety series Omnibus, which aired during the Festival '61 time-slot.

== Synopsis ==
Season one provided a mix of classical era plays like Shakespeare's 1599 historical tragedy Julius Caesar, and late-romantic / early-modern offerings like Chekhov's 1900 Russian drama Three Sisters, along with operas that included Gluck's 1762 Orfeo ed Euridice, the 1903 Strauss one-act Elektra adaption, Verdi's 1893 comedy Falstaff, and Gilbert and Sullivan's 1878 comedy H.M.S. Pinafore.

More contemporary works included plays and adaptations such as Emlyn Williams' psychological thriller Night Must Fall (1935), Arthur Laurents' 1946 drama Home of the Brave, and two of Jean Anouilh plays, Colombe (1950) and Ring Round the Moon, a 1950 adaptation by English dramatist Christopher Fry of Anouilh's Invitation to the Castle (1947). One episode provided two presentations; Harold Pinter's comedy-drama The Dumb Waiter (1957), and Edward Albee's first play The Zoo Story (1958), which were both plays in one-act. Polish playwright Sławomir Mrożek's first play, the 1958 drama The Police, was also presented, written in the style of Theatre of the Absurd.

A purely musical program also aired, performing classical compositions by Beethoven. Along with Western music, the Peking Opera provided Eastern, traditional Chinese opera which combines music with acrobatics, dance, mime, and stage combat with martial arts weapons.

In addition to theatrical plays, adaptions of novels and short stories where also presented, such as Dickens' oft-adapted, oft-filmed, 1861 Gothic coming of age novel Great Expectations, two short stories from 1891, Wilde's semi-comic mystery Lord Arthur Savile's Crime, and Henry James' emotional The Pupil, along with more modern novels like Brian Moore's 1960 fiction The Luck of Ginger Coffey and Hugh Walpole's 1924 macabre The Old Ladies.

== Production ==
For the premiere Festival '61 episode, H.M.S. Pinafore, the performance was staged in Toronto. A special in-studio theatre was constructed to maintain a theatrical ambience with room for seats to invite a live audience, a stage, proscenium arch, curtains, and a full orchestra. The studio theatre was used afterwards by CBC Television for subsequent shows.

Canadian actor William Shatner was billed as a special guest star for the role of Mark Antony in Julius Caesar. Including main roles, the production cast fifty actors as soldiers, bearers, citizens, women, and extras. Anneke Franck from the make-up team tackled a particular problem, making a cast of Douglas Rain's face to build a custom Roman-esque nose for NBC's make-up director, Robert O'Bradovich, using a special Hollywood process involving the baking of sponge latex, which could not be accomplished in Toronto.

The performance of Oscar Wilde's short story, Lord Arthur Savile's Crime required construction of twelve different sets to accommodate the play's action, which roamed from place to place; a Venice café, the Thames Embankment, and everywhere in between.

At a duration of one hour and forty-five minutes, Elektra was recorded early in January 1961 in Toronto at the cost of $60,000. It marks the North American television premiere of Richard Strauss' opera, with a new English translation by Franz Kraemer.

== Notable guest cast ==
- Sharon Acker
- Luther Adler
- Pierrette Alarie
- Edward Atienza
- Edith Atwater
- Ivor Barry
- Donald Bell
- Katherine Blake
- Mervyn Blake
- Douglas Campbell
- Richard Cassilly
- Madeleine Christie
- John Colicos
- Albert Dekker
- Peter Donat
- James Doohan
- Norman Ettlinger
- Timothy Findley
- Ted Follows
- Claire Gagnier
- Robin Gammell
- Bruno Gerussi
- Glenn Gould
- Rex Hagon
- Martha Henry
- Eric House
- Martita Hunt
- Frances Hyland
- Robert Jeffrey
- Alan King
- Charmion King
- Michael Learned
- Neil McCallum
- Jane Mallett
- Hedley Mattingly
- Elizabeth Mawson
- Howard Mawson
- Roberta Maxwell
- Iréna Mayeska
- Mavor Moore
- Hayward Morse
- Cathleen Nesbitt
- Elena Nikolaidi
- Louis Quilico
- Gerard Parkes
- Douglas Rain
- Michel Ray
- Liam Redmond
- Kate Reid
- Toby Robins
- Leonard Rose
- Jan Rubeš
- William Shatner
- Léopold Simoneau
- Ruth Springford
- Marion Studholme
- Claramae Turner
- John Vernon
- Tony Van Bridge
- Fritz Weaver
- Kathleen Widdoes
- Chris Wiggins
- Tudi Wiggins
- Jeremy Wilkin
- Austin Willis
- Joseph Wiseman

== Episodes ==
Notes:

- For four weeks, the Montreal 9.30 p.m. time-slot was listed as "Festival '61–Omnibus" replacing CBC productions with programming by the American educational variety series, Omnibus (hosted by Alistair Cooke, featuring plays, music performances, and discussions). The Omnibus episode titles and their Festival air dates follow: "Night People" (5 December 1960), "Abraham Lincoln: The Early Years" (30 January 1961), "Fierce, Funny and Far Out" (27 February 1961), and "An Omnibus of American Song" (20 March 1961).
- For three other weeks, other programs aired; The Bell Telephone Hour on 28 November 1960, the Hallmark Hall of Fame Christmas opera The Golden Child on 12 December 1960, and NHL Hockey on 10 April 1961.
- For the week of 17 April 1961, "The Subject is Beethoven" was re-aired. It originally aired the week of 6 February 1961.

No. overall	No. in season	Title	Directed by	Written by	Original release date	Ref.
1	1	"H.M.S. Pinafore"	Norman Campbell	Gilbert and Sullivan	10 October 1960	
Please add a Plot Summary here, replacing this text. For guidance, see How to write a plot summary. Episode summaries must be expressed in your own words. Do NOT submit content you find from another web site as it is plagiarism and likely a copyright violation, which Wikipedia cannot accept and will be removed or reverted. Superficially modifying copyrighted content or closely paraphrasing it, even if the source is cited, still constitutes a copyright violation. As per Television Plot Manual of Style,^{MOS:TVPLOT} summaries should be about 100 to 200 words in length, and those substantially less than 100 words are most likely to be scrutinized for possible copyright violation. Notable cast: Avon Theatre players from the Stratford Festival company, directed by Tyrone Guthrie, Eric House, Marion Studholme, Douglas Campbell, Howard Mawson, Elizabeth Mawson, Robert Jeffrey, et al. Notes: Musical director, Louis Applebaum. Produced by Norman Campbell.
2	2	"Colombe"	Mario Prizek	Play by : Jean Anouilh; Adapted by : Ivor Barry	17 October 1960	
Please add a Plot Summary here, replacing this text. For guidance, see How to write a plot summary and Television Plot Manual of Style.^{MOS:TVPLOT} Cast: Kathleen Widdoes, Jeremy Wilkin, Mary Savidge, Timothy Findley, Jane Mallett, Eric House, Drew Thompson, Ivor Barry, Joseph Shaw, Lawrence Beattie, Ian Thompson, Rodney Archer, Eric Heath, and Orest Ulan.
3	3	"The Old Ladies"	Eric Till	Novel by : Hugh Walpole; Dramatization by : Rodney Ackland; Adapted by : Bernard Slade	31 October 1960	
Please add a Plot Summary here, replacing this text. For guidance, see How to write a plot summary and Television Plot Manual of Style.^{MOS:TVPLOT} Cast: Martita Hunt (Agatha), Frances Hyland (Miss Berringer), and Betty Leighton (Lucy Amorest).
4	4	"Peking Opera"	Unknown	Unknown	21 November 1960	
Recorded in Montreal, John Grenfell interviews artistic director Chang Tung-chuan about Chinese Classical Theatre. Excerpts from the Peking Opera tour of Canada: Dance of the Peacocks – Corps de ballet, featuring Tsi Hua-tuan as she presents Tai minority folklore, depicting peacocks frolicking at the lake.; Three Encounters – (dialog/acrobatics/mime/weapon-play) An exiled general stays at an inn. Another general arrives, ordered to protect him. The innkeeper, suspecting treason, intends to kill him to protect his exiled friend. Orchestral strings heighten the action.; Orchestral – Dance of the Yao Nation, and The Village Girl.; Dance of the Red Ribbons – Girls and boys weave patterns in the air with sashes.; The Autumn River – (singing/mime/dialogue) Hsia Mei-chin portrays a maid crossing to join her fiancé. The mischievous elderly boatman (Sun Cheng-wu) nearly tips her overboard; he relents, smiles and continues.; Dance of the Bounteous Harvest – Girls in oversized children's masks wake Piso ta-chang of Chiangsi from the cabbages to play games.; Offering of the Pearl on the Rainbow Bridge – (singing/mime/combat, starring Liu-chi) Against celestial law, the Si-shui sea goddess marries a mortal, giving him a magic pearl. The Emperor of Jade Heaven orders his celestial army to arrest her. Her sea-people fight. Helpless without her pearl, she retreats.
5	5	"Julius Caesar"	Paul Almond	Play by : William Shakespeare; Adapted by : Paul Almond	19 December 1960	
Please add a Plot Summary here, replacing this text. For guidance, see How to write a plot summary and Television Plot Manual of Style.^{MOS:TVPLOT} Cast: Fritz Weaver (Brutus), Gillie Fenwick, Douglas Rain, Bruno Gerussi, Kate Reid, Frances Hyland, William Shatner, Ron Hartmann, John Vernon, Robin Gammell, Joseph Shaw, Henry Comor, Ted Follows, and Ivor Barry. Duration: 2 hours.
6	6	"Ring Round the Moon"	Mario Prizek	Play by : Jean Anouilh; Translated by : Christopher Fry	2 January 1961	
Please add a Plot Summary here, replacing this text. For guidance, see How to write a plot summary and Television Plot Manual of Style.^{MOS:TVPLOT} Cast: Leo Ciceri, Toby Robins, Eric House, Sharon Acker, Joseph Shaw, Mary Savidge, Gillie Fenwick, Jane Mallett, Winnifred Dennis, Elizabeth Cole, and Drew Thompson.
7	7	"Home of the Brave"	Harvey Hart	Play by : Arthur Laurents; Adapted by : Allan Manings	9 January 1961	
Please add a Plot Summary here, replacing this text. For guidance, see How to write a plot summary and Television Plot Manual of Style.^{MOS:TVPLOT} Cast: James Doohan, Ted Follows, Mavor Moore, Dino Narizzano, George Sperdakos, William Bell, and Mavor Moore.
8	8	"Lord Arthur Savile's Crime"	Norman Campbell	Story by : Oscar Wilde; Adapted by : Rita Greer Allen	16 January 1961	
Please add a Plot Summary here, replacing this text. For guidance, see How to write a plot summary and Television Plot Manual of Style.^{MOS:TVPLOT} Cast: John Colicos, Martha Buhs, Margaret Braidwood, Moya Fenwick, Catherine Proctor, Norman Welsh, Leo Leyden, Joseph Shaw, Drew Thompson, Lawrence Beattie, Ed Simay, Bill Glover, Louise Nicol, Lew Davidson, and Alan King.
9	9	"Elektra"	Franz Kraemer	Opera by : Richard Strauss; Translated by : Franz Kraemer	23 January 1961	
Please add a Plot Summary here, replacing this text. For guidance, see How to write a plot summary and Television Plot Manual of Style.^{MOS:TVPLOT} Cast: Virginia Gordoni (Elektra), Elena Nikolaidi (Clytemnestra), Ilona Kombrink (Chrysothemis), Victor Godfrey (Orestes), and Richard Cassilly (Aegisthus). Music: Toronto Symphony Orchestra with Walter Susskind (conductor). Duration: 1 hour, 45 minutes.
10	10	"The Subject is Beethoven"	Unknown	Ludwig van Beethoven	6 February 1961	
In this one-hour show, pianist Glenn Gould discusses the composer Ludwig van Beethoven, and performs his music. Gould plays the Eroica Variations, Opus 35, a set of 15 Variations and Fugue for Piano in E♭ major. Cellist Leonard Rose discusses the next composition, and plays Beethoven's Sonata No. 3 for Cello and Piano, Opus 69, accompanied by Gould on piano. Produced by Franz Kraemer.
11	11	"Three Sisters"	Mario Prizek	Play by : Anton Chekhov; Adapted by : Desmond Scott	13 February 1961	
Please add a Plot Summary here, replacing this text. For guidance, see How to write a plot summary and Television Plot Manual of Style.^{MOS:TVPLOT} Cast: Frances Hyland, Michael Learned, Kate Reid, John Vernon, Peter Donat, Jeremy Wilkin, Henry Comor, Jane Mallett, Timothy Findley, Anne Collings, and Peter Mannering. Duration: 2 hours.
12	12	"Night Must Fall"	Unknown	Play by : Emlyn Williams; Adapted by : Hugh Webster	20 February 1961	
Please add a Plot Summary here, replacing this text. For guidance, see How to write a plot summary and Television Plot Manual of Style.^{MOS:TVPLOT} Genre: Psychological thriller. Cast: Neil McCallum, Jill Showell, Tony Van Bridge, Madeleine Christie, Betty Leighton, Anne Butler, Stephen Appleby, Leo Leyden, Pat Malone, Kenneth Wilks, and Roy Passano. Notes: first performed in 1935.
13	13	"The Dumb Waiter"	Unknown	Harold Pinter	6 March 1961	
13	13	"The Zoo Story"	Unknown	Edward Albee	6 March 1961	
14	14	"Orphee"	Pierre Mercure	Christoph Willibald Gluck	13 March 1961	
This one-hour production of Christoph Willibald Gluck's opera, Orfeo ed Euridice (English: Orpheus and Eurydice), is based on the myth of Orpheus, and his journey into the underworld to pursue his dead wife, Eurydice. It is performed in French by lyric tenor Léopold Simoneau as Orpheus, coloratura soprano Pierrette Alarie as Eurydice, and soprano Claire Gagnier as L'Amour. They are accompanied by the CBC Symphony Orchestra conducted by Otto-Werner Mueller, a choir directed by Marcel Laurencelle, and members of Les Grands Ballets Canadiens, directed by its founder, Ludmilla Chiriaeff.
15	15	"Great Expectations"	Eric Till	Novel by : Charles Dickens; Adapted by : Eric Till	27 March 1961	
Please add a Plot Summary here, replacing this text. For guidance, see How to write a plot summary and Television Plot Manual of Style.^{MOS:TVPLOT} Cast: Douglas Rain (Pip), Cathleen Nesbitt (Miss Havisham), Michael Learned (Estelle), Eric House, Tony Van Bridge, James B. Douglas, Ivor Barry, Diana Maddox, Gillie Fenwick, Marigold Charlesworth, Rex Hagon, Wendy Wulff, Hedley Mattingly, Leo Leyden, Mervyn Blake, and Timothy Findley (Bentley Drummle). Duration: 2 hours.
16	16	"Royal Gambit"	Unknown	Play by : Hermann Gressieker; Adapted by : George White	3 April 1961	
Please add a Plot Summary here, replacing this text. For guidance, see How to write a plot summary and Television Plot Manual of Style.^{MOS:TVPLOT} Cast: Albert Dekker, Katherine Blake, Tani Seitz, Kate Reid, Diana Maddox, Louise Nicol, and Victoria Mitchell. Notes: Produced by Robert Allen. Play originally titled: Henry VIII and his Six Wives.
17	17	"Pictures in the Hallway"	Eric Till	Autobiography by : Seán O'Casey; Adapted by : Paul Shyer	24 April 1961	
Please add a Plot Summary here, replacing this text. For guidance, see How to write a plot summary and Television Plot Manual of Style.^{MOS:TVPLOT} Cast: Douglas Rain (Narrator), Liam Redmond, Frances Hyland, Diana Maddox, Larry Beattie, Gerard Parkes, Hayward Morse, Robin Gammell, and Joan Barrett. Notes: From O'Casey's "Autobiographies" Vol. 2 (1942).
18	18	"The Dybbuk"	Harvey Hart	Play by : S. Ansky; Adapted by : Mac Shoub	1 May 1961	
Please add a Plot Summary here, replacing this text. For guidance, see How to write a plot summary and Television Plot Manual of Style.^{MOS:TVPLOT} Cast: Luther Adler (Rabbi), Dino Narizzano (Channon), Avra Petrides (Leah), and Joseph Wiseman (Messenger).
19	19	"The Police"	Unknown	Play by : Sławomir Mrożek; Adapted by : Jack Kruper	8 May 1961	
Please add a Plot Summary here, replacing this text. For guidance, see How to write a plot summary and Television Plot Manual of Style.^{MOS:TVPLOT} Cast: Joseph Wiseman, Douglas Rain, Mavor Moore, Charmion King, and Liam Redmond.
20	20	"Falstaff"	Unknown	Opera by : Giuseppe Verdi; Translated by : Chester Kallman & H. Proctor-Gregg	15 May 1961	
Please add a Plot Summary here, replacing this text. For guidance, see How to write a plot summary and Television Plot Manual of Style.^{MOS:TVPLOT} Cast: Louis Quilico (Falstaff), Ilona Kombrink (Mistress Ford), Donald Bell (Ford), Claramae Turner (Dame Quickly), Darlene Hirst (Mistress Page), Jan Rubeš (Pistol), Andrew Downie (Bardolph), Constance Lambert (Nanetta), Nasco Petroff (Fenton), and Phil Stark (Dr. Caius). Notes: Based on Shakespeare's The Merry Wives of Windsor. Ernesto Barbini (conductor), Albert Pratz (concertmaster), Mario Bernardi (vocal coach), Franz Kraemer (producer). Duration: 2 hours.
21	21	"The Pupil"	Unknown	Story by : Henry James; Adapted by : Michael Dyne	22 May 1961	
Please add a Plot Summary here, replacing this text. For guidance, see How to write a plot summary and Television Plot Manual of Style.^{MOS:TVPLOT} Cast: Albert Dekker, William Job, Edith Atwater, Michel Ray, Tudi Wiggins, Iréna Mayeska, Edwin Stephenson, and Ivor Barry. Producer: Franz Kraemer. Duration: 1:40.
22	22	"The Quare Fellow"	Unknown	Brendan Behan	29 May 1961	
Please add a Plot Summary here, replacing this text. For guidance, see How to write a plot summary and Television Plot Manual of Style.^{MOS:TVPLOT} Cast: Liam Redmond, Douglas Campbell, Chris Wiggins, Gerard Parkes, Sean O'Ceallaigh, George Luscombe, Hugh Watson, Nicholas Lawlor, Ted Follows, J.G. O'Brien, Jeremy Wilkin, Peter Brockington, Austin Willis, David Hooks, Norman Ettlinger, Lester Nixon, Larry Beattie, John Horton, Peter Mews, and Donald Ewer. Produced by Harvey Hart.
23	23	"The Offbeats"	Mario Prizek	Jacques Languirand	5 June 1961	
Please add a Plot Summary here, replacing this text. For guidance, see How to write a plot summary and Television Plot Manual of Style.^{MOS:TVPLOT} Notes: English adaptation of Languirand's play Les Insolites. Cast: Eric House (Barman), James Doohan (Jules), Drew Thompson (Pitt), Charles Palmer (Ernest), Jill Foster, Gillie Fenwick, Catherine Proctor, Scott Peters, Peter Brockington, and James Edmond.
24	24	"The Killdeer"	Unknown	James Reaney	12 June 1961	
Please add a Plot Summary here, replacing this text. For guidance, see How to write a plot summary and Television Plot Manual of Style.^{MOS:TVPLOT} Cast: Kate Reid, Robin Gammell, Don Bryn, Roberta Maxwell, James Doohan, Mervyn Blake, Amelia Hall, William Brydon, and Sharon Acker. Producer: Franz Kraemer.
25	25	"The Luck of Ginger Coffey"	Harvey Hart	Novel by : Brian Moore; Adapted by : M. Charles Cohen	19 June 1961	
Please add a Plot Summary here, replacing this text. For guidance, see How to write a plot summary and Television Plot Manual of Style.^{MOS:TVPLOT} Cast: Douglas Rain, Diana Maddox, Eric House, Ruth Springford, Gordent Pinsent, Stephanie Mew, William Isell, Edward Atienza, and Gerard Parkes.

Start of Series	List of Festival episodes	Succeeded by Season 2
