= Macbeth (1961 film) =

1961 Canadian television film

- Digital remaster cover art
- Based on: The Tragedy of Macbeth by William Shakespeare
- Screenplay by: Paul Almond
- Directed by: Paul Almond
- Starring: Sean Connery
- Country of origin: Canada
- Original language: English

Production
- Producer: Paul Almond
- Running time: 85 minutes
- Production company: Canadian Broadcasting Corporation

Original release
- Release: 1 January 1961

Macbeth is a 1961 Canadian television adaptation of William Shakespeare's Macbeth starring Sean Connery (in his only lead Shakespearean role). The screenplay was adapted by Paul Almond who also directed the production. It was originally broadcast by CBC in five parts on 30 November, 5 December, 7 December, 12 December, and 14 December 1961; and then re-edited into a 90-minute single episode that aired in April 1962 as part of the CBC's second season of the anthology series Festival.

== Plot ==
The Scottish lord Macbeth chooses evil as the way to fulfill his ambition for power. He commits regicide to become king and then furthers his moral descent with a reign of murderous terror to stay in power, eventually plunging the country into civil war. In the end, he loses everything that gives meaning and purpose to his life before losing his life itself.

== Cast ==
- Sean Connery – Macbeth
- Zoe Caldwell – Lady Macbeth
- Ted Follows – Macduff
- Robin Gammell – Malcolm
- William Needles – Banquo
- Anthony Ray – Menteith
- Bernard Behrens – Lennox
- Eric Christmas – Porter
- Gillie Fenwick – Angus
- Hedley Mattingly – Doctor of Physic
- Jacqueline Ivings – Witch (3rd)
- Jay Shannon – Murderer (2nd)
- Larry Zahab – Seyton
- Max Helpmann – Ross
- Natalia Butko – Witch (2nd)
- Peter Needham – Murderer (1st)
- Peter Tully – Macduff’s son
- Powys Thomas – King Duncan
- Raymond Bellew – Donalbain
- Rex Hagon – Fleance
- Sharon Acker – Lady Macduff
- Victoria Mitchell – Witch (1st) / Gentlewoman

== Production ==
This adaptation was shot in black and white in the CBC Studios at 1140 Yonge Street in Toronto, Ontario.
