= Catherine Proctor =

Canadian actress

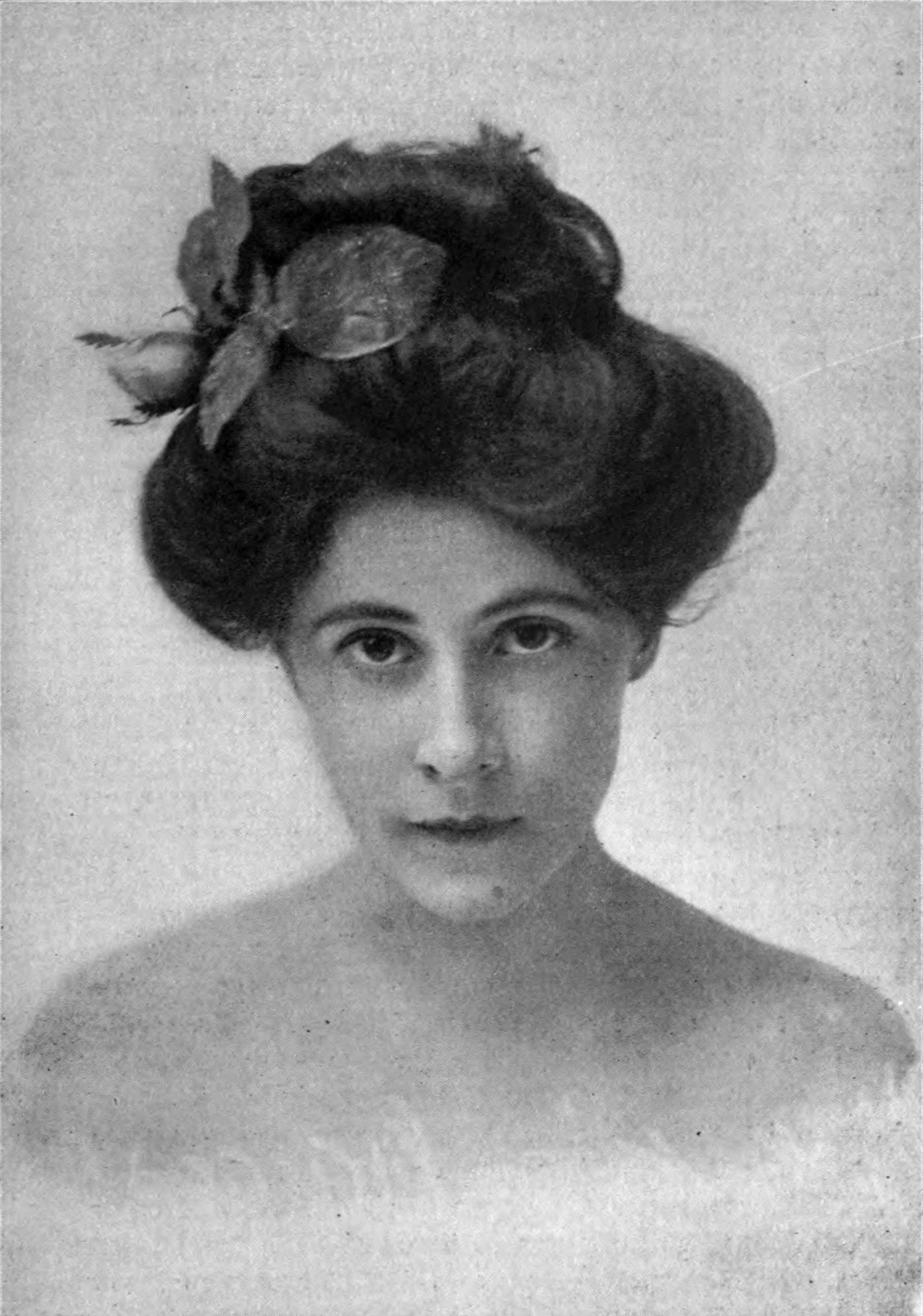
- Catherine Proctor, from a 1908 publication
- Born: November 12, 1878; New Edinburgh, Ontario, Canada
- Died: August 24, 1967 (aged 88); Toronto, Ontario, Canada
- Occupation: Actress

Louisa Catherine Proctor (November 12, 1878 – August 24, 1967) was a Canadian actress whose career included roles on Broadway, in silent films, and on radio and television. She was called "one of the authentic great ladies of the stage" in a Montreal newspaper in 1956.

== Early life and education ==
Proctor was born in New Edinburgh, Ontario, one of the six children of William Proctor and Catherine McDonald Proctor. Her father worked in real estate and hotels, and died in 1892. She began performing as a dramatic reader while still a girl. She attended the Toronto College of Music, and appeared in college theatrical productions.

== Career ==
Proctor had a busy stage career for over five decades. She toured with stock companies beginning in 1902. Her stage credits included roles in The Pretty Sister of José, The Other Girl, Peter Pan, A Midsummer Night's Dream (1906), Paid in Full, Society and the Bulldog (1908), The Concert (1910–1912), The Easiest Way (1912), The Governor's Lady (1913), Now and To-morrow (1915), Depths of Purity (1915), Out There (1917), The Wooing of Eve (1917), Happiness (1917–1918), The Matinee Hero (1918), The Mirage (1920–1921), Ambush (1921), The Wife with the Smile (1921), East of Suez (1922), Bristol Glass (1923), Macbeth (1924), The Steam Roller (1924), Ariadne (1925), The Importance of Being Earnest (1926), L'Aiglon (1927–1928), Electra (1928), Girl Trouble (1928), Sakura (1928), The Royal Box (1928–1929), The Ghost Parade (1929), Greater Love (1931), If Booth Had Missed (1932), Nine Pine Street (1933), Ah, Wilderness! (1935), The Puritan (1936), Howdy Stranger (1937), Reflected Glory (1937), Miss Quis (1937), Biography (1937), The Late George Apley (1944–1945), Arsenic and Old Lace (1943, 1950, 1956), Mistress of Jalna (1953), and Separate Tables (1958).

On radio, Proctor was in a 1934 production of a comedy Thursday Night. She appeared in several silent films, and had small roles in several more sound pictures. "Yes, I have seen myself in a film," she told a Toronto newspaper in 1915. "It feels most uncanny. Sometimes I thought, 'Surely I never looked as badly as that?'"

== Filmography ==
=== Film ===
- Without Hope (1914) – La Belle
- Not Guilty (1915) – Dora Birch
- The Foolish Virgin (1916) – Nance Anthony
- A Society Scandal (1924) – Mrs. Burr
- Youth Takes a Fling (1938) – Mrs. Aspitt
- The Women (1939) – Woman in Cabinet (uncredited)
- Emergency Squad (1940) – Emily (uncredited)
- Abe Lincoln in Illinois (1940)
- City of Chance (1940) – (uncredited)
- A Woman's Face (1941) – Mrs. Sergerblum (uncredited)

=== Television ===
Catherine Proctor television credits
Year	Title	Role	Notes	Ref.
1952	Not for Publication	Unknown	1 episode	
1957	On Camera	Mrs. Taylor	1 episode	
1958	Johnny Belinda	Mrs. Lutz	Television film	
1960	Dow Hour of Great Mysteries	Mrs. Vesey	1 episode	
1960	First Person	Unknown	2 episodes	
1954–1960	Encounter	Ellen	7 episodes	
1961	Festival	Lady Clem	Episode: "Lord Arthur Savile's Crime" (S1.E8)	
1961	Festival	The Old Lady	Episode: "The Offbeats" (S1.E23)	
1961	Quest	Unknown	1 episode	
1964	Playdate	Sophie	1 episode	
1965	CBC Show of the Week	Little Old Lady	1 episode	
