= Festival (Canadian TV series) =

1960 Canadian television anthology program

- Country of origin: Canada
- Original language: English
- No. of seasons: 9

Production
- Executive producer: Robert Allen

Original release
- Network: CBC Television
- Release: 10 October 1960 – 26 March 1969

Related
- List of Festival episodes Season 1 · Season 2 · Season 3 · Season 4 · Season 5 · Season 6 · Season 7 · Season 8 · Season 9

Festival (initially titled Festival '61) is a Canadian entertainment anthology television program that aired on CBC Television for nine seasons from 1960 to 1969.

The program showcased cultural productions across a range of theatrical, literary, and musical offerings. Classic and contemporary plays, operas, ballet, orchestral compositions, and television adaptations were sourced from both Canadian and international repertoire, and performed by professional companies such as the Stratford Festival, the Metropolitan Opera, and the National Ballet of Canada, among others.

== Premise ==
CBC Television aired dramatic and musical anthology series such as Scope and Folio during the 1950s. Robert Allen, a producer on Folio, became supervising producer of the new Festival series.

== Series overview ==
Series	Episodes	Originally released		Day / Time	Duration	Specials
Series	Episodes	First released	Last released	Day / Time	Duration	Specials
1	25	10 October 1960	19 June 1961	Monday, 9:30 p.m.	60–90	100–120
2	25	2 October 1961	11 June 1962	Monday, 9:30 p.m.	60–90	120
3	25	1 October 1962	20 May 1963	Monday, 9:30 p.m.	60–90	135
4	29	2 October 1963	24 June 1964	Wednesday, 9:30 p.m.	60–90	120–170
5	27	7 October 1964	30 June 1965	Wednesday, 9:30 p.m.	60-90	—N/a
6	32	15 September 1965	6 July 1966	Wednesday, 9:30 p.m.	30–90	120–155
7	20	14 September 1966	10 May 1967	Wednesday, 9:30 p.m.	30–90	—N/a
8	13	4 October 1967	8 May 1968	Wednesday, 9:30 p.m.	30–90	—N/a
9	14	30 October 1968	26 March 1969	Wednesday, 9:30 p.m.	60–90	120

== Notable guest cast ==
As an anthology series, Festival did not have main, regular, or recurring cast members, but instead, a number of notable actors who were regularly cast in multiple episodes across its nine-season run.

For instance, Gillie Fenwick appeared in two dozen episodes, and Joseph Shaw and Paul Harding a dozen each. Donald Ewer, Budd Knapp, and Leo Leyden, all appeared in nine episodes. And with seven episodes each, James Edmond, Arch McDonnell, Rex Sevenoaks, and Drew Thompson were also series regulars.

Two actors would go on to appear in the James Bond film series. Sean Connery who played the title role in Macbeth (1961) which re-aired on Festival in 1962, took the role of James Bond in 1962. Joseph Wiseman appeared on Festival twice in 1961 before his role as Dr. No opposite Connery.

Star Trek actors appeared well before its debut episode in 1966, including William Shatner (Kirk), James Doohan (Scotty), and two who would portray Klingons, actors John Colicos as the recurring character Kor, and Christopher Plummer as Chang in Star Trek VI: The Undiscovered Country (1991).

Notable actors appearing in five or more episodes include the following.

- Sharon Acker
- Ivor Barry
- Bernard Behrens
- Len Birman
- Mervyn Blake
- Zoe Caldwell
- Barbara Chilcott
- Robert Christie
- Eric Christmas
- Susan Clark
- Lawrence Dane
- Peter Donat
- John Drainie
- Timothy Findley
- Martha Henry
- Eric House
- William Hutt
- Frances Hyland
- Michael Learned
- Cosette Lee
- Jane Mallett
- Howard Mawson
- Neil McCallum
- William Needles
- Gerard Parkes
- Gordon Pinsent
- Douglas Rain
- Kate Reid
- Norma Renault
- Ruth Springford
- Tony Van Bridge
- John Vernon
- Hugh Webster
- Sandy Webster
- Chris Wiggins
- Jeremy Wilkin

For a complete list of notable guest cast:

== Production ==
The production cost of a typical Festival drama show was approximately $45,000 in 1961, among the highest production costs of CBC programming at the time. Productions such as a ballet performance or a Gilbert and Sullivan play could cost $60,000 for CBC.
