= Another Man, Another Chance =

1977 film

- Directed by: Claude Lelouch
- Written by: Claude Lelouch
- Produced by: Georges Dancigers; Alexandre Mnouchkine
- Starring: James Caan; Geneviève Bujold; Francis Huster
- Cinematography: Stanley Cortez; Jacques Lefrancois
- Edited by: Georges Klotz; Fabien D. Tordjmann
- Music by: Francis Lai
- Production company: Chartoff-Winkler Productions
- Distributed by: United Artists
- Release date: 28 September 1977 (France)
- Running time: 136 minutes
- Countries: France; United States
- Languages: English; French

Another Man, Another Chance (Un autre homme, une autre chance, UK title: Another Man, Another Woman) is a 1977 Western film directed by Claude Lelouch.

== Plot ==
France in 1870: Napoleon III has just lost the war against Prussia and left the country in poverty.

Young Jeanne (Geneviève Bujold) falls in love with photographer Francis (Francis Huster), who soon takes her with him when he emigrates to The United States. In a small town in the still Wild West, they build up a small photo shop. Meanwhile, animal doctor David (James Caan) lives on his lonesome farm with his wife.

It takes two years and two tragic accidents until Jeanne and David meet. Alone with a child, Jeanne has decided to return to France and is about to leave but then she and David silently and carefully fall in love for the second time in their lives and hope returns.

== Cast ==
- James Caan as David Williams
- Geneviève Bujold as Jeanne Leroy (née Perriere)
- Francis Huster as Francis Leroy
- Susan Tyrrell as Debby / Alice
- Jennifer Warren as Mary Williams
- Rossie Harris as Simon
- Linda Lee Lyons as Sarah
- Jacques Villeret as Customer
- Fred Stuthman as Mary's Father
- Diana Douglas as Mary's Mother
- Michael Berryman as 1st Bandit
- William S. Bartman as Telegrapher
- Dominic Barto as Wounded Man
- Dick Farnsworth as Stagecoach Driver
- George Flaherty as Sheriff Carter
- Robert Tessier as Blacksmith
- Jean-Francois Remi as Jeanne's father
- Walter Barnes as Foster
- Bernard Behrens as Springfield
- Oliver Clark as Evans
- Tony Crupi as Billy the Kid
- Burton Gilliam as Sheriff Jake Murphy
- Rance Howard as Wagonmaster
- Scott Walker as Stevens
- Jack Ging as Preacher
- Christopher Lloyd
- Vincent Schiavelli as Train Traveler
