= Bernard Behrens =

British-Canadian actor (1926–2012)

- Bernard Behrens in Hill Street Blues 1982
- Born: September 28, 1926
- Died: September 19, 2012 (aged 85)
- Occupation: Actor
- Years active: 1961–2010
- Spouse: Deborah Cass

Bernard Behrens (September 28, 1926 – September 19, 2012) was a British-Canadian actor.

He was noted as a two-time Gemini Award winner, winning Best Actor in a Television Film or Miniseries at the 6th Gemini Awards in 1992 for his performance in the dramatic anthology series Saying Goodbye (1990), and Best Supporting Actor in a Drama Program or Series at the 9th Gemini Awards in 1995 for the television film Coming of Age (1993).

== Early life ==
Born and raised in London, England, he moved to Canada at the start of World War II. Based in Winnipeg, Manitoba, he cofounded a theatre company there with Bill Walker, Helene Winston and Peggy Green in 1951.

== Career ==
=== Stage ===
Although he often had supporting or guest roles in film and television, he was principally associated with stage roles for theatre companies such as the Dominion Drama Festival, the Canadian Players and the Stratford Festival, as well as sometimes returning to the United Kingdom to perform at the Bristol Old Vic.

=== Screen ===
==== Television ====
Behrens appeared on-screen as early as 1961, in a CBC teleplay of Shakespeare's Macbeth in the role of Lennox, along with Sean Connery as Macbeth and Zoe Caldwell as Lady Macbeth. The five parts were originally broadcast separately, and later combined, edited, and re-released as a single ninety-minute presentation in 1962.

With his stage experience, he followed up Macbeth with other dramatic plays in television series such as CBC's anthology Playdate in the 1962 episode "Mr. Oblomov," a 1946 play by John Coulter, derived from Ivan Goncharov's 1859 novel, Oblomov. That same year, Behrens appeared on CBC's anthology Festival playing Orazio in "The Queen and the Rebels" adapted from Ugo Betti's 1949 play. He would appear several more times on Playdate through the 1960s, and in other such series like the CBC Show of the Week in "Rasputin was a Nice Old Man" (1968).

Behrens also appeared in episodic series from the 1960s and 1970s such as McQueen (1969), Great Performances (1975), Little House on the Prairie and The Bionic Woman, both in 1977, Starsky & Hutch and Columbo both in 1978. Beginning in the mid-70s, He also appeared in television miniseries and films, such as Captains and the Kings (1976), A Question of Guilt (1978), and Friendly Fire (1979).

In the 1980s and 1990s, Behrens played roles in television films like A Little Piece of Heaven (1991), and Incident in a Small Town (1994). Behrens played two doctor roles on the espionage/crime fighting series Counterstrike. In the 1990 episode "Mindbender" he played a psychiatrist Dr. Burns, who examines Stephen Shellen's character Luke Brenner after Luke received brainwashing from the KGB. In the 1991 episode "Village of the Damned" Behrens plays biologist Dr. Joseph Severn, who goes murderously mad after being sprayed by pesticide bonded with an hallucinogen. Between 1993 and 1996 he had three different roles on Kung Fu: The Legend Continues.

In addition to his two 1990s Gemini awards, he was nominated for Best Supporting Actor in a Drama Program or Series at the 1st Gemini Awards in 1986 for the television film Turning to Stone (1985), and Best Guest Actor in a Drama at the 20th Gemini Awards for an appearance on This Is Wonderland (2005).

==== Film ====
Behrens appeared in a score of theatrical films, beginning in the 1970s in James Goldstone's romantic adventure Swashbuckler (1976), and in Claude Lelouch's French Western film Another Man, Another Chance (1977).

In 1980, Behrens was cast as Robert Lingstrom in Peter Medak's supernatural horror The Changeling. Behrens was often cast as doctors which he portrayed in Jack Smight's romantic comedy Loving Couples and Daniel Petrie's drama Resurrection, both released in 1980, and again in Clarke Mackey's drama Taking Care (1987). Other films in the '80s include the science fiction horror Galaxy of Terror (1981), Clint Eastwood's action techno-thriller Firefox (1982), Carl Reiner's sci-fi black comedy The Man With Two Brains (1983), Howard Zieff's romantic comedy Unfaithfully Yours (1984), and Jesse Vint's comedy Another Chance (1989).

In 1990, he played another doctor, Winslow, in the Canadian drama Beautiful Dreamers (1990), and played Doc Milgrom in George Gallo's holiday crime comedy Trapped in Paradise (1994). He also appeared in films directed by Keith Gordon, including his 1996 romantic war drama Mother Night as Dr. Lionel Jones, and his 2000 mystery drama Waking the Dead as Father Stanton. In 1999, he played Mayor Claire in John Paizs' Canadian comedy-horror Top of the Food Chain, and Monsieur Farrin in Jerry Ciccoritti's crime thriller The Life Before This (1999).

==== Radio ====
In 1981 he voiced the role of Obi-Wan Kenobi in a radio dramatization of Star Wars for National Public Radio.

== Personal life ==
Behrens was married to Canadian actress Deborah Cass. He died in 2012, just 9 days prior to his 86th birthday.

== Filmography ==
=== Film ===
- 1976: Swashbuckler – Sir James Barnet
- 1977: Another Man, Another Chance – Mr. Springfield, Redland Gazette owner
- 1980: The Changeling – Robert Lingstrom
- 1980: Loving Couples – Elegant Doctor
- 1980: Resurrection – Dr. Fisher
- 1981: Galaxy of Terror – Commander Ilvar
- 1982: Firefox – William Saltonstall
- 1983: The Man With Two Brains – James Gladstone
- 1984: Unfaithfully Yours – Bill Lawrence
- 1987: Taking Care – Dr O'Donnell
- 1989: Another Chance – St. Peter
- 1989: What's Up, Hideous Sun Demon – Major Clive McGonad (voice)
- 1990: Beautiful Dreamers – Dr. Winslow
- 1993: Double or Nothing: The Rise and Fall of Robert Campeau – Ken White
- 1993: Zero Patience – Dr. Placebo
- 1994: Trapped in Paradise – Doc Milgrom
- 1996: Mother Night – Dr. Lionel Jones
- 1999: Top of the Food Chain – Mayor Claire
- 1999: The Life Before This – Monsieur Farrin
- 2000: Waking the Dead – Father Stanton

=== Television ===
Bernard Behrens television credits
Year	Title	Role	Notes	Ref.
1961	Macbeth	Lennox	Teleplay. CBC	
1962	Playdate	Zakhar	Episode: "Mr. Oblomov"	
1962	Festival	Orazio	Episode: "The Queen and the Rebels" (S2.E12)	
1962	Festival	Captain Baltinsky	Episode: "The Offshore Island" (S2.E16)	
1968	CBC Show of the Week	Frame	Episode: "Rasputin was a Nice Old Man"	
1969	McQueen	Unknown	Episode: "How Could You Use a Poor Maiden So" (S1.E4)	
1975	Great Performances	Sir Peter Teazle	Episode: "The School for Scandal"	
1976	Captains and the Kings	Gentleman	TV miniseries	
1977	Little House on the Prairie	Bailey Farrell	Episode: The Creeper of Walnut Grove" (S4.E6)	
1977	The Bionic Woman	Beaumont / Major Petrov	2 episodes	
1978	Starsky & Hutch	Haley Gavin	1 episode	
1978	A Question of Guilt	D.A. Koch	TV movie	
1978	Columbo	George O'Connell	1 episode	
1979	Friendly Fire	Dietrich	TV movie	
1981	Born to Be Sold	Judge	TV movie	
1982	Hill Street Blues	Bank Manager	1 episode	
1983	In Defense of Kids	Edgar Dempsey	TV movie	
1985	Highway to Heaven	Dr. Sheaffer	1 episode	
1986	Turning to Stone	Professor Campbell	TV movie	
1986	A Deadly Business	Purchasing Agent	TV movie	
1986	The Canadian Conspiracy	Unknown	TV movie	
1986	Christmas Eve	Dean	TV movie	
1987	Haunted by Her Past	Karen's Father	TV movie	
1987	A Nest of Singing Birds	Eddie Wiebe	TV movie	
1988	The Ann Jillian Story	Father Thompson	TV movie	
1989	Glory Enough for All	Frederick Allen	TV movie	
1989	Sorry, Wrong Number	Dr. Fisher	TV movie	
1989	Christmas in America: A Love Story	Unknown	TV movie	
1990	Love and Hate: A Marriage Made in Hell	Judge MacPherson	TV movie	
1990	Murder Times Seven	Judge Harry Rhoades	TV movie	
1990	Counterstrike	Dr. Burns	Episode: "Mindbender" (S1.E17)	
1990–1991	Dracula: The Series	Gustav Helsing	21 episodes	
1991	A Little Piece of Heaven	Cecil Loomis	TV movie	
1991	Counterstrike	Dr. Joseph Severn	Episode: "Village of the Damned"	
1992	Saying Goodbye	[?]	Episode: "A Home Alone"	
1992	A Town Torn Apart	Angus MacLean	TV movie	
1993	Ghost Mom	Dr Mallory	TV movie	
1993	Coming of Age	Arthur Stone	TV movie	
1993–1996	Kung Fu: The Legend Continues	Andrei / M. Desjardin / George	3 episodes	
1994	Incident in a Small Town	Judge Greeves	TV movie	
1995	The Possession of Michael D.	Dr. Jerry	TV movie	
1995	Hiroshima	Asst. Secretary of War, John J. McCloy	TV movie	
1995	Mary Higgins Clark's Remember Me	Henry Sprague	TV movie	
1996	Captive Heart: The James Mink Story	Carberry	TV movie	
1996	Hostile Advances: The Kerry Ellison Story	Judge Gaffney	TV movie	
1996	A Holiday for Love	Hal	TV movie. AKA Christmas in My Hometown	
1998	Evidence of Blood	Dr. Vernon Stark	TV movie	
1998	The Defenders: Taking the First	Milton Lewis	TV movie	
2002	The Day Reagan Was Shot	Attorney General William French Smith	TV movie	
2005	This Is Wonderland	Fred Spreewell	2 episodes	
