= Trump Davidson =

- Birth name: James Douglas Davidson
- Born: November 26, 1908; Sudbury, Ontario, Canada
- Died: May 2, 1978 (aged 69); Sudbury, Ontario, Canada
- Genres: Jazz
- Occupation(s): Bandleader, cornetist
- Instrument: Cornet
- Years active: 1926-1978
- Formerly of: The Melody Five, Luigi Romanelli, Ray Noble, Horace Lapp

James Douglas "Trump" Davidson (November 26, 1908 - May 2, 1978) was a Canadian jazz bandleader and cornetist.

Davidson formed one of Canada's earliest jazz bands in 1925, under the name The Melody Five. From 1929 to 1936 he played in Luigi Romanelli's orchestra, then led a dance band from 1937 to 1942, which broadcast on NBC and toured in the UK with Ray Noble in 1938–39. He worked in Horace Lapp's orchestra in 1942, then led a dance band in Toronto at the Palace Pier from 1944 until 1962. This group appeared often on CBC radio and recorded several times during the 1960s. He led a big band from 1974 to 1978, also singing with this group.
