= Ivor Barry =

Welsh actor (1919–2006)

- Barry in That Girl, 1969
- Born: 12 April 1919; Merthyr Tydfil, Wales
- Died: 12 December 2006 (aged 87); Woodland Hills, California, U.S.
- Resting place: Forest Lawn Memorial Park, Hollywood Hills
- Occupation: Actor
- Years active: 1949–1995

Ivor Barry (12 April 1919 – 12 December 2006) was a Welsh film and television actor.

== Biography ==
Born in South Wales, Barry served with the British Royal Artillery during World War II and completed his university studies before beginning his acting career. After working in British repertory theatre, he emigrated to Canada in 1953, initially settling in Montreal. There, he worked in radio under Rupert Kaplan and performed with Montreal Repertory, as well as in theatrical productions in Moncton, New Brunswick, and North Hatley, Quebec. His ability to speak French helped him during his early Canadian career.

During the mid-1950s, Barry appeared in several theatrical productions in Quebec. In June 1955, he portrayed Dr. William R. Chumley in Mary Chase’s comedy Harvey at Montreal’s Mountain Playhouse, directed by Roberta Beatty.

In June 1956, Barry returned to the Mountain Playhouse, playing Mr. Witherspoon in Joseph Kesselring’s Arsenic and Old Lace, directed by Jean de Savoye. Two months later, he appeared as Elyot Chase opposite Lynne Gorman in Noël Coward’s Private Lives at the North Hatley Playhouse, under the direction of Arthur Voronka. O’Hearn considered Barry somewhat miscast but commended his commitment to the role and his delivery of Coward’s dialogue.

After four years in Montreal, Barry moved to Toronto, where he worked extensively in radio and live television. Among his Canadian television appearances was the role of Dr. O’Leary, a hospital’s chief heart surgeon, in Arthur Hailey’s The Troubled Heart, presented on CBC Television’s Playdate. Barry later credited his work on the Canadian television series Moment of Truth with attracting attention from American producers and leading to opportunities in the United States.

In 1966, Barry moved to Hollywood, seeking greater opportunities in American film and television. By October of that year, he was one of several Canadian actors working in Hollywood, alongside performers including James Doohan and William Shatner. Despite retaining his British citizenship, Barry considered himself a Canadian actor, explaining that he had developed his craft in Canada.

His American television appearances included Bonanza, Daniel Boone, Bewitched, Hawaii Five-O, Mission: Impossible, The Streets of San Francisco, Mannix, The F.B.I., The Six Million Dollar Man, Fantasy Island, Punky Brewster, and Highway to Heaven. He also appeared in films including The Great White Hope, The Andromeda Strain, and Herbie Rides Again.

Barry continued to perform in Canadian theatre after relocating to California. He appeared as Andrew Wyke in Anthony Shaffer’s Sleuth at the Gryphon Theatre in Barrie, Ontario, and later returned to the role in a production at Brock Education Theatre in St. Catharines, directed by Sean Mulcahy. He was also scheduled to portray Sir George Crofts in George Bernard Shaw’s Mrs. Warren’s Profession at the Citadel Theatre in Edmonton.

In the 1985 film Weird Science, Barry portrayed the grandfather of Wyatt (Ilan Mitchell-Smith) and Chet (Bill Paxton) Donnelly.

Barry died of heart failure in Woodland Hills, Los Angeles, on 12 December 2006, aged 87.

== Filmography ==
- Under Capricorn (1949) – 1st Guard in Hall (uncredited)
- Nobody Waved Good-bye (1964) – Interviewer
- The King's Pirate (1967) – Cloudsly
- The Scorpio Letters (1967) – Rt. Hon. John Murney
- In Enemy Country (1968) – Air Marshal Evelyn
- The Lawyer (1970) – Wyler
- The Andromeda Strain (1971) – Murray (uncredited)
- Carola (TV – 1973) – Parmentier
- Herbie Rides Again (1974) – Chauffeur
- Lost in the Stars (1974) – Carmichael
- The Dove (1974) – Kenniston
- The Island at the Top of the World (1974) – The Butler
- To Be or Not to Be (1983) – General Hobbs
- Weird Science (1985) – Henry Donnelly
- Action Jackson (1988) – Stuffy Old Guy

=== Television ===
- CBC Summer Theatre (1955) – (1 episode) – the bishop
- On Camera (1957) – (1 episode) – Duke
- A Midsummer Theatre (1958) – (1 episode) – role unknown
- First Performance (1955 – 1959) – (2 episodes) – role unknown
- The Unforeseen (1958 – 1960) – (6 episode) – Roles Unknown
- General Motors Theatre (1956 – 1960 ) – (20 episodes) – different character in each episode
- Hudson's Bay (1959) – (3 episode) – Roger Phipps/The Director/The Governor
- R.C.M.P. (1960) – (1 episode) – Lee Fletcher
- First Person (1960 – 1961 ) – (2 episode) – unknown role/Prince of Milan
- Festival ( 1960 – 1967) – (12 episodes) – various characters
- Quest (1962 – 1963) – (4 episode) – unknown role/Professor Bjoernson/unknown role
- The Forest Rangers (1963) – (1 episode) – Professor Black
- Scarlett Hill (1963) – (2 episode) – Elston/Walter Pendleton
- Playdate (1962 – 1964) – (6 episode) – various roles
- Moment of Truth (1964) – (unknown episode) – Dr. Russell Wingate
- Seaway (1966) – (2 episodes) – Huberman
- Laredo (1966) – (1 episode) – Count Frollo
- The Girl from U.N.C.L.E. (1966) – (1 episode) – Freuchen-Nagy
- Run for Your Life (1966) – (1 episode) – Dr. McEwen
- 12 O’Clock High (1966) – (1 episode) – Air Marshal Kingsford
- Daniel Boone (1966 – 1969) – (4 episodes) – President Washington/British Commandant/Commodore Morrison/Hamilton
- Bonanza (1966-1972) – (2 episodes) – Morgan / Preacher
- The Flying Nun (1967) – (1 episode) – Bishop Dillion
- Love on a Rooftop (1967) – (1 episode) – Dean Claridge
- Bewitched (1971) – (2 episodes) – Chamberlain
- The Partridge Family (1972) – (1 episode) – Mr. Hensley
- The Starlost 1974 - Episode: "Space Precinct" - Chief Rathe Masters
- The Streets of San Francisco (1974 – 1977) – (2 episodes) – Raymond Howard/Judge Dudley Cramer
- Hawaii Five-O (1974) – (1 episode) – S.N. Savage/Dempster
- The Rockford Files (1976) – Cryder
- Barnaby Jones (1978) – (1 episode) – Dr. Kirby
- Father Murphy (1982) – (1 episode) – Butler
- The A-Team (1983) – (1 episode) – old man in cab
- Matt Houston (1985) – (1 episode) – Lloyd Hutchins
- Hotel (1985 – 1986) – (2 episodes) – Byron Singer/Alan Mahoney
- Highway to Heaven (1984 – 1987) – (3 episodes) – Dr. Erhardt / Parks – Butler / Joseph
- Jake and the Fatman (1988) – (1 episode) – Edward
