= Ted Follows =

Canadian stage and screen actor (1926–2016)

- Born: Edward James Follows; November 30, 1926; Ottawa, Ontario, Canada
- Died: October 21, 2016 (aged 89); Kitchener, Ontario, Canada
- Education: University of Toronto
- Spouses: Dawn Greenhalgh (m. 1958; div. 1979) Susan Trethewey (m. 1988)
- Children: 4, including Megan
- Relatives: Sean O'Bryan (son-in-law)

Edward James "Ted" Follows (November 30, 1926 – October 21, 2016) was a Canadian film, television and stage actor. He was best known for playing the role of Macduff in Macbeth at the Stratford Festival and the 1961 CBC Television film adaptation, and his television roles as the title character in the CBC drama series McQueen, as crown attorney Arnold Bateman in Wojeck, and as Charles Tupper, Minister of Railways, in The National Dream.

== Early life and education ==
Follows was born in Ottawa, Ontario in 1926 to Edward James Follows and Isabella (née Latimer) Follows, and had a younger brother, Jack. He was raised in a variety of locations across Canada as his father was a serviceman with the Royal Canadian Air Force. Ted Follows attended high school in Winnipeg. He studied psychology at the University of Toronto, also acting in Hart House theatre productions, and following his graduation he had his first professional acting role in 1945.

== Career ==
Over the next number of years, Follows regularly toured Canada and the United Kingdom with the Canadian Players and the Canadian Repertory Theatre Company, before being invited to join the Stratford company in 1955.

In 2001, Follows directed a production of Noël Coward's Hay Fever in Gravenhurst, with a cast that included himself, his ex-wife Dawn Greenhalgh, all of their children and their children's spouses. They subsequently mounted a tour of the production to several Southern Ontario cities in 2003.

== Personal life ==
He married actress Dawn Greenhalgh in 1958. The couple had four children, including actress Megan Follows and television writer and producer Edwina Follows, before divorcing in 1979. Follows later remarried to Susan Trethewey, a musician with the Stratford Festival Orchestra in 1988.

== Filmography ==
=== Film ===
| Year | Title | Role |
|---|---|---|
| 1953 | Rob Roy: The Highland Rogue | Douglas MacGregor |
| 1957 | Oedipus Rex | Chorus |
| 1973 | Paperback Hero | Cagey |
| 1980 | Virus | Dr. Baines |
| 1989 | Cold Comfort | Roy |

=== Television ===
| Year | Title | Role | Notes |
|---|---|---|---|
| 1954 | Sunday Night Theatre | Pvt. Brown | Episode: "The Promised Years #2: The Good Partners" |
| 1956–1961 | General Motors Theatre | Various roles | 12 episodes |
| 1959 | Hudson's Bay | Sam Gifford | 2 episodes |
| 1960 | The Unforeseen | Charles | Episode: "Desire" |
| 1960 | Startime | Raphael | Episode: "The Zeal of Thy House" |
| 1960–1962 | Festival | Hurst / Mickser / Major | 4 episodes |
| 1961 | Macbeth | MacDuff | Television film |
| 1961 | The Conquest of Cobbletown | Fred Cobble | Television film |
| 1961 | Quest | Wu | 2 episodes |
| 1961–1962 | Playdate | Various roles | 6 episodes |
| 1963 | The United States Steel Hour | Seaton | Episode: "The Troubled Heart" |
| 1966 | Seaway | David Miller / Darby | 3 episodes |
| 1966–1968 | Wojeck | Arnie Bateman | 20 episodes |
| 1969 | Quentin Durgens, M.P. | Cabinet minister | Episode: "Master of the House" |
| 1969–1970 | McQueen | McQueen | 14 episodes |
| 1974 | The National Dream | Charles Tupper | Episode: "The Great Debate" |
| 1974 | Performance | Immigration Officer | Episode: "Find Volopchi!" |
| 1979 | The Spirit of Adventure: Night Flight | Leblanc | Television film |
| 1979 | The Great Detective | Percy | Episode: "Death Takes a Curtain Call" |
| 1980–1982 | The Littlest Hobo | Various roles | 5 episodes |
| 1988 | War of the Worlds | General Arquette | 2 episodes |
| 1992 | E.N.G. | Commissioner | Episode: "True Patriot Love" |
| 1992 | Counterstrike | Unknown | Episode: "Cyborg" |
| 1992 | Wojeck: Out of the Fire | Arnold Bateman | Television film |
| 1993 | Matrix | Mr. Preston | Episode: "The Yellow Chamber" |
| 1993 | Shattered Trust: The Shari Karney Story | Airplane Man | Television film |
| 1993 | JFK: Reckless Youth | Patsy Mulkern | 2 episodes |
