= Grant Strate =

Canadian ballet dancer and choreographer

Grant Strate, CM FRSC (December 7, 1927 – February 9, 2015) was a Canadian dancer, choreographer and academic.

Born in Cardston, Alberta, though he started out in Edmonton as a lawyer he was an original member of the National Ballet of Canada and was a soloist, choreographer and teacher with the company as well. From 1970 to 1980, he was the founding Chair of York University's Department of Dance. From 1980 to 1989, he was the Director of the School for Contemporary Arts at Simon Fraser University. In 1994, he was made a Member of the Order of Canada in recognition for being "a creative and tactful presence on arts and dance committees nationwide". ^{Profile, gg.ca; accessed February 11, 2015.}

In 1996, Strate received the Governor General's Performing Arts Award for Lifetime Artistic Achievement, Canada's highest honour in the performing arts. In 1999, he was awarded the Canada Council for the Arts Jacqueline Lemieux Prize. In 2006, he was made a Fellow of the Royal Society of Canada.

Strate was an Advisory Council member of the Dancer Transition Resource Centre.

Strate died of cancer, aged 87, at home in Vancouver on February 9, 2015.
