= Louis Roney =

American opera singer

Louis Roney (January 26, 1921 – November 5, 2017) was a tenor inducted into the Florida Artists Hall of Fame in 2012. His career spans 40 years, at least four languages and two films: Carmen (Montreal) and The Tales of Hoffman (Paris).

Roney received a tribute in the Congressional Record of the 112th Congress of the United States for "his outstanding contributions to the State of Florida and the arts".

Roney studied singing with Sidney Dietch. He sang the American premiere of Massenet's Marie-Magdeleine at Lincoln Center in New York City and founded the Festival of Orchestras concert series in 1984. He taught for 24 years at the University of Central Florida and published hundreds of columns of "Play On!", a newspaper column dedicated to cultural affairs.
