= Luigi Romanelli (conductor) =

Canadian conductor and violinist

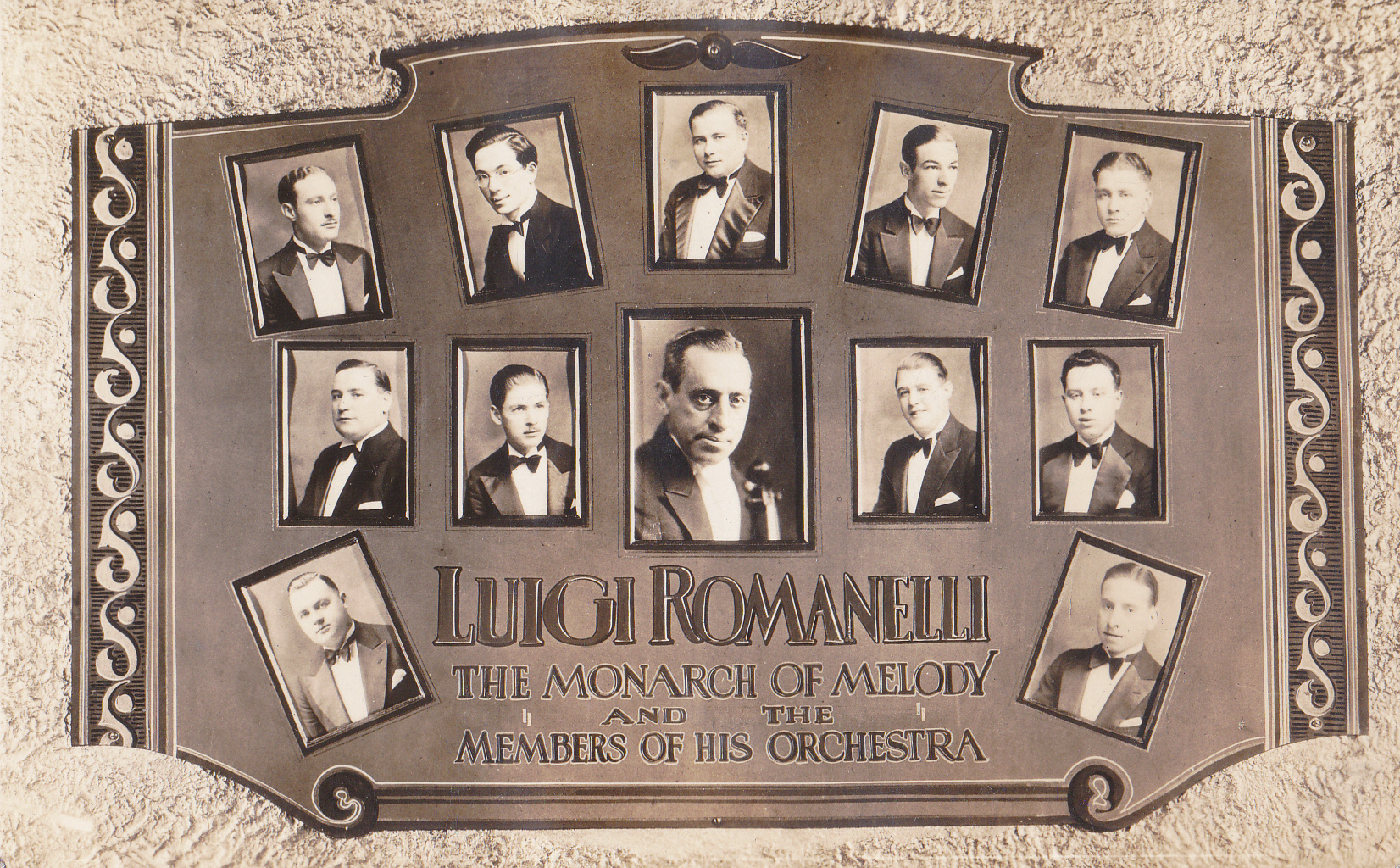
Luigi Romanelli’s Orchestra

Luigi Romanelli (29 November 1885, Belleville, Ontario - 29 July 1942, La Malbaie) was a Canadian conductor and violinist. His orchestra, the Romanelli Orchestra, was one of the most popular orchestras on radio, in concert, and on record in Canada from the 1920s up until his death in the early 1940s. Under his leadership, the Romanelli Orchestra made recordings for His Master's Voice, Edison Records, and Bluebird Records.

Romanelli and his orchestra performed on March 28, 1922, in the first concert broadcast on the radio in Toronto.
