= A Midsummer Theatre =

Canadian television series

- Genre: Drama anthology
- Country of origin: Canada
- Original language: English
- No. of seasons: 1

Production
- Producer: Ken Davey
- Running time: 30 minutes

Original release
- Network: CBC Television
- Release: 25 July – 5 September 1958

A Midsummer Theatre is a Canadian dramatic television program that aired on CBC Television in 1958.

== Premise ==
The Montreal-produced series consisted of various plays, many of which were written specifically for the program. Featured playwrights included Eugene Cloutier (Mary Ann), M. Charles Cohen (A Dispute of Long Standing, The Equalizer and Trio), Joseph Schull (The Eleventh Hour), Roy Shields (Monsieur Mac-Greg-Or) and Roderick Wilkinson (The Colonel).

== Scheduling ==
The half-hour series aired Fridays at 9:00 p.m. (Eastern) from 25 July to 5 September 1958,
