= Charmion King =

Canadian actress (1925–2007)

- Born: July 25, 1925; Ontario, Canada
- Died: January 6, 2007 (aged 81); Ontario, Canada
- Occupation: Actress
- Years active: 1952–2002
- Spouse: Gordon Pinsent
- Family: Leah Pinsent

Charmion King (July 25, 1925 – January 6, 2007) was a Canadian actress.

== Biography ==
Born in Toronto, Ontario. King studied theatre at the University of Toronto, where she performed at the University's Hart House Theatre, getting notice in Shaw's Saint Joan.

In 1947, King joined the Straw Hat Players, a summer circuit troupe in the Muskoka Lake district. In 1951, King went to England for two years of study.

In 1953, King returned to Canada and joined the cast of the new Crest Theatre. She gave notable performances as the main character in the Madwoman of Chaillot (1961) and in Chekhov's Three Sisters (1956). It was at the Crest that she met her future husband Gordon Pinsent.

King went on to the Stratford Festival appearing in productions of The Winter's Tale, Three Sisters and Uncle Vanya. In 1960, she appeared in Toronto at the Royal Alexandra Theatre (Royal Alex) and on Broadway in Tyrone Guthrie's production of Love and Libel.

After appearing in Orpheus Descending at the Crest (her 18th appearance at the Crest) in 1962, King took a break from acting. In 1964, her daughter Leah was born. King raised Leah while Gordon developed his career. After a while, King stopped receiving offers to act. It would be a decade before she returned to acting.

In 1972, King appeared at the Shaw Festival in a production of The Royal Family, directed by the Crest's Donald Davis, and also starring Jonathan White, Ruth Nelson, Patricia Gage and Paul Kligman. In 1977, King returned to the Toronto stage at the St Lawrence Centre in Easter. She also appeared in S.H.O.R.T.S at Toronto's Redlight Theatre, and in Sweet Bird of Youth at Hart House Theatre. In 1979, King created the role of Jessica Logan in Jitters for the Toronto Free Theatre. She reprised the role at New Haven's Long Wharf Theatre that year and in a revival in Toronto in 1986. In 1980, King starred with Alan Scarfe, Frances Hyland and Eric House in Night of the Iguana by Theatre Plus. In 1988, King starred with Kate Reid in Arsenic and Old Lace at Hart House Theatre. Her final stage role was in February 2006 with Toronto's Soulpepper Theatre Company in Our Town.

In 1991, King played Noah's wife in Timothy Findley's Not Wanted On The Voyage for CBC-Radio's "Arts National" series.

King has also acted in notable television films, including Anne of Green Gables (as Josephine Barry) and Jackie, Ethel, Joan: The Women of Camelot (as Rose Fitzgerald Kennedy). She also starred in the Canadian television series Wind at My Back and House of Pride. In 1988, she appeared in the film Shadow Dancing.

King won the Nellie Award in 1985 for best radio actress in Canada.

== Personal life ==
King was married to Gordon Pinsent for 44 years until her death. Their daughter, Leah Pinsent, is also a noted Canadian television actress.

King died, aged 81, in Toronto, reportedly from complications of emphysema.

Her papers are in the collection of the Toronto Public Library.

== Filmography ==
=== Film ===
Year	Title	Role	Notes
1964	Nobody Waved Good-bye	Mother	
1966	Affair with a Killer		
1969	Don't Let the Angels Fall	Myrna	
1977	Who Has Seen the Wind	Mrs. Abercrombie	
1988	Shadow Dancing	Grace Meyerhoff	
1998	Last Night	Grandmother	
2001	Picture Claire	Lady on the Train	
2002	A Promise	Mum	Short

=== Television ===
Year	Title	Role	Notes
1952	Theatre Royal	Julie Cavendish	TV film
1952	Anne of Green Gables	Mrs. Allen	"Great Aunt Josephine"
1953, 1955-1957 & 1959 - 1961	Encounter	Rosalind Marshall/Mrs. Davenport, Mable / Mary Brock, Grace Shearing, Grace Slidell, Jean & Ruby Crawford	"Star Light, Star Bright" & "The Coming Out of Ellie Swan", "The Magic Life", "Failure to Remain", "Guest Appearance", "Some Of My Best Friends", "A Wind from the South" & "Company Party"
1955	Playbill		"The Typewriter Murder"
1956	Folio	Gwendolyn Fairfax	"The Importance of Being Earnest"
1957	The Adventures of Tugboat Annie	Lydia	"The Romance of Horatio Bullwinkle"
1957 & 1958	On Camera	Martha Madison / Grace & Joan	"A Lesson in Psychology", "Wait for Me" & "The Beard"
1959	The Family Reunion	Mary	TV film
1960	First Person	Ethel Blanton	"Some Are So Lucky"
1961 & 1962	Playdate	Ursula Bennett, "Nightmare" & "The Eye Opener Man and the Wages of Zinn"	"Valerie" & Ellen / Laura
1961	Q for Quest	Karin Hildebrandt	"The Standard of Dying"
1961	Quest	Marion	"Sam"
1961	Festival	Mrs. Provocateur	"The Police"
1962	Festival	Queen / Aurore	"The Queen and the Rebels" & "Bousille and the Just"
1963	Playdate	Ruth Rutledge / Anne / Mrs. Wenfield	"The Man Who Cheered the Leafs", "Willow Circle", "The Fight for Martin Wheeler"
1963	The Forest Rangers	Juliette Davis	"The Deputy"
1964	A Very Close Family	Daughter	TV film
1965 & 1966	Seaway	Emily Paneau & Anna Amorest	"Nothing But a Long Goodbye" & "Don't Forget to Wipe the Blood Off: Parts 1 & 2"
1969	Room 222	Dora Hughes	"The Exchange Teacher"
1973	McMillan & Wife	Ann Grey	"Death of a Monster... Birth of a Legend"
1974	House of Pride	Mary Kirby	TV series
1985	Anne of Green Gables	Great Aunt Josephine Barry	TV miniseries
1987	Anne of Green Gables: The Sequel	Great Aunt Josephine Barry	TV miniseries
1988	Katts and Dog	Princess Rosa	"Comedy of Errors", "Princess Rosa" & "Protective Custody"
1988	The Twilight Zone	Diane Brockman	"Our Selena Is Dying"
1990	The Hitchhiker	Margaret Cabot	"Hard Rhyme"
1994	Broken Lullaby	Natalia Rostova	TV film
1997	Traders	Frankie Beal	"Family Legacy"
1997	Psi Factor	Bridget Jamieson	"The Damned"
1997–2001	Wind at My Back	Daisy Whitney	Recurring role
1998	My Own Country	Young Man's Mother	TV film
1998	Witness to Yesterday	Mary Pickford	"Mary Pickford"
2000	Twitch City	Meals Lady	"Klan Bake"
2001	Jackie, Ethel, Joan: The Women of Camelot	Rose Kennedy	TV film
2001	Twice in a Lifetime	Anne	"Final Flight"
