= The Unforeseen =

Canadian television series

- Genre: Drama
- Country of origin: Canada
- Original language: English
- No. of seasons: 2

Production
- Executive producer: Peter Francis

Original release
- Network: CBC Television
- Release: 2 October 1958 – 9 March 1960

The Unforeseen is a Canadian drama television series that aired on CBC Television from 1958 to 1960.

== Premise ==
This anthology series featured stories of suspense or plots with surprise endings. Donald Jack and executive producer Peter Francis were among the few Canadian writers, since producers found it difficult to find domestic talent who could adequately create stories to suit the format.

The Unforeseen was purchased for broadcast in the United Kingdom by Granada Television.

== Scheduling ==
In the first season, The Unforeseen was broadcast in a half-hour timeslot on Thursdays at 8:30 p.m. from 2 October 1958 to 2 April 1959. The following season was broadcast on Wednesdays at 10:00 p.m. from 28 October 1959 to 9 March 1960.
