= Marion Studholme =

English soprano (1927–2016)

Marion Studholme (27 June 1927 – 6 January 2016) was an English soprano, best known for her performances with Sadler's Wells Opera Company, and as a regular performer on the popular BBC radio programme Friday Night Is Music Night.

Studholme was born in Blackpool; her parents were John Studholme, a water board engineer, and his wife Daisy. She was educated at Childwall Valley High School, and then studied under Rodolfo Mele at the Royal College of Music. After completing her studies, she joined the chorus of Sadler's Wells Opera and was soon taking leading roles, such as Lucinda in School for Fathers by Ermanno Wolf-Ferrari. She later became a teacher at the Royal College of Music.

In 1952 she married Andrew Downie, who had been a fellow student at the Royal College of Music. They performed together in several productions of Gilbert and Sullivan operettas, directed by Tyrone Guthrie. They had two sons.

Marion Studholme made few recordings. One was the 1959 Decca recording of Benjamin Britten's Peter Grimes, conducted by the composer himself, in which she sang the role of "Niece 1". Another was as Yum-Yum in The Mikado, conducted by Alexander Faris. On television she played Mabel Stanley in The Pirates of Penzance, Josephine in HMS Pinafore (1960–62) and as "Molly" in an adaptation of Die Fledermaus (1950). Her husband Andrew Downie had a long career as a television actor and died in 2009.
