= Mervyn Blake =

Canadian actor (1907–2003)

- Spotlight photo by Angus McBean, 1936
- Born: Mervyn Alexander Clifford Blake; 30 November 1907; Dehradun, India
- Died: 9 October 2003 (aged 95)
- Occupation: actor
- Awards: Order of Canada

Mervyn Alexander Clifford Blake, CM (30 November 1907 – 9 October 2003) was a Canadian stage actor.

Blake was born in Dehradun India, where his father worked as a railway executive. After his family returned to England, he fell in love with theatre and attended London's Royal Academy of Dramatic Art, graduating in 1933. He made his professional theatre debut in 1933 at the Embassy Theatre in London. At the start of World War II, he joined the British Army as a driver, and was present at the Bergen-Belsen concentration camp liberation in April 1945, an experience which haunted him for the rest of his life.

After the War, he was an acting company member at the Shakespeare Memorial Theatre in Stratford Upon Avon from 1952 to 1955. During this time, he worked with prominent actors such as Sir Laurence Olivier, Sir Michael Redgrave, and Dame Peggy Ashcroft.

In the mid 1950s, he and his wife Christine Bennett moved their family to Canada, following British acting colleagues Tony Van Bridge and Powys Thomas. He joined the acting company at the Stratford Festival of Canada in 1957, where he stayed to perform in 111 productions over 42 consecutive seasons. In 1988, he performed in The Two Gentlemen of Verona, making him the first company member to perform in the entire canon of Shakespeare's plays.

Blake was appointed a member of the Order of Canada in 1995. He died in 2003 at a nursing home in Toronto following a long illness.
