= Elizabeth Mawson =

Canadian mezzo-soprano

Elizabeth Anne Mawson (née Burlington; 14 February 1927 – 16 February 2008) was a Canadian mezzo-soprano who appeared in opera, operetta, and musical theatre.

== Life and career ==
She was particularly known for her performances as Marilla in Anne of Green Gables, a role which she performed annually at the Charlottetown Festival for nearly 30 years, as well as in Canadian touring productions in 1970, 1973, 1980, and 1986. She was married to the bass-baritone singer Howard Mawson and frequently performed with him in the Toronto Light Opera Association. After its demise, she appeared in 1957 as Hanna in The Merry Widow and Carrie Pipperidge in Carousel with the Opera Festival Association of Toronto, and in the 1960s with its successor, the Canadian Opera Company, as Martha in Faust and Flora in La traviata, and also at the Stratford Festival as Hebe in H.M.S. Pinafore and Marcellina in The Marriage of Figaro. Other roles included Miss Todd in Gian-Carlo Menotti's The Old Maid and the Thief. Mawson was born in Toronto and died in her native city at the age of 81.

== Legacy ==
Her sons Douglas and Allan have launched an endowment fund in her memory. The Elizabeth Mawson Theatre Legacy Fund will ensure support is available for scriptwriters, choreographers, performers, songwriters and directors and make sure that read-throughs and workshops are made possible for new development projects at The Charlottetown Festival. The fund is held within the Confederation Centre of the Arts Foundation.
