= Hedley Mattingly =

British actor (1915–1998)

- Mattingly in Daktari, 1967
- Born: Hedley Howard Mattingly; May 7, 1915; London, England
- Died: March 3, 1998 (aged 82); Encino, California, U.S.
- Resting place: Forest Lawn Memorial Park
- Occupation: Actor
- Years active: 1930s–1997
- Spouse: Barbara Mattingly

Hedley Howard Mattingly (May 7, 1915 – March 3, 1998) was a British actor who appeared in many American films and television series.

== Career ==
Hedley Mattingly was born in London, England. He began his career as a stage actor before the outbreak of World War II, during which he served in the Royal Air Force. In the early 1950s he moved to Canada accompanied by his wife Barbara, appearing in several CBC television dramas, before moving again to California in the 1960s.

In the 1960s and 1970s, he guest-starred in the NBC television series Thriller (1962). He also appeared in The Alfred Hitchcock Hour, Perry Mason, Death Valley Days, Mannix, Night Gallery, Ironside, and Columbo. He was featured in Alexander Galt: The Stubborn Idealist (1962), King Rat (1965), and The Bermuda Triangle (1979). His last appearance was in the film Riot (1997), with Sugar Ray Leonard.

Mattingly's best-known role was as the recurring character of Officer Hedley in the CBS series, Daktari (1966–1969) starring Marshall Thompson in the title role.

== Death ==
Mattingly died of cancer at Encino, California, in March 1998 and was buried at Forest Lawn Memorial Park.

== Filmography ==
- 1958: Folio -TV - Sgt. Deems
- 1959: Hudson's Bay -TV - Factor Balfour / The Captain / Clifton
- 1962: Thriller -TV - Canadian Man
- 1962: Five Weeks in a Balloon - Butler (uncredited)
- 1962: Alexander Galt: The Stubborn Idealist - Gov. Gen. Sir Edmund Head
- 1963: The Thrill of It All - Sidney - Chauffeur
- 1963: The Travels of Jaimie McPheeters -TV - Henry T. Coe
- 1964: Signpost to Murder - Police Constable Mort Rogers
- 1964: The Man from UNCLE (The Shark Affair) -TV - Mr. Wye / Captain Fowler
- 1964: Death Valley Days -TV (as an historical figure Joseph Harris Ridges (1827–1914) in episode "An Organ for Brother Brigham") - Joseph Ridges / Victor de Kiraly / Eadneard Muybridge
- 1965: Strange Bedfellows - Bagshott
- 1965: Marriage on the Rocks (1965) - Mr. Smythe (uncredited)
- 1965: King Rat - Dr. Prudhomme
- 1965: Westinghouse Desilu Playhouse -TV - Bartender
- 1966: Torn Curtain - Airline Official (uncredited)
- 1966: Daktari -TV - District Officer Hedley
- 1969: Mannix -TV - Dustin Rhodes
- 1970: Get Smart -TV
- 1971: Columbo -TV - Customs Man
- 1973: Lost Horizon - Col. Rawley
- 1973: Cleopatra Jones - Mattingly
- 1973: Emergency! - Sir Eric Rossman
- 1977: Lucan -TV - President Davies
- 1978: Hawaii Five-O -TV - Episode: The Meighan Conspiracy - Doheni
- 1979: The Bermuda Triangle - (uncredited)
- 1981: Goliath Awaits -TV - Bailey
- 1984: All of Me - Grayson
- 1984: Dynasty -TV - Vicar / Mr. Jensen
- 1996: Riot - Butler (final film role)
