= Franz Kraemer =

Canadian radio producer (1914–1999)

- Born: June 1, 1914; Vienna, Austria
- Died: August 27, 1999 (aged 85); Toronto, Ontario, Canada
- Other names: Franz Krämer
- Occupations: musician, composer
- Known for: TV and radio producer

Franz Kraemer, OC (June 1, 1914 – August 27, 1999) was a Canadian radio producer, a "pioneer produced of opera at CBC Television". In the 1930 he studied music in Vienna, with Alban Berg, Anton von Webern and others. Leaving Austria like many other artists in the 1930s around the time of the Nazi takeover in 1938, Kraemer became a naturalized Canadian citizen in 1947, the first year that Canadian citizenship was made available (prior to that all Canadians were considered British subjects). Kraemer made a name for himself as a gifted music composer and producer; he has been called by Adrienne Clarkson, former Governor General of Canada and CBC journalist, as "the most prolific and talented music producer the CBC Television ever produced ... He was a mentor for many of us in television who did that kind of programming."

Kraemer's career was cut short in Austria by fascism and a climate of hatred. Asked about it, we would simply say "Mr. Hitler ruined me." In Canada, he became a close colleague and friend of Glenn Gould. Eric Koch said "Franz knew everything" in music. In 1971, he was appointed music director of the Toronto Arts Foundation. In 1981, he was made a Member of the Order of Canada and was promoted to Officer in 1987.
