= William Needles =

Actor (1919–2016)

George William Needles, CM
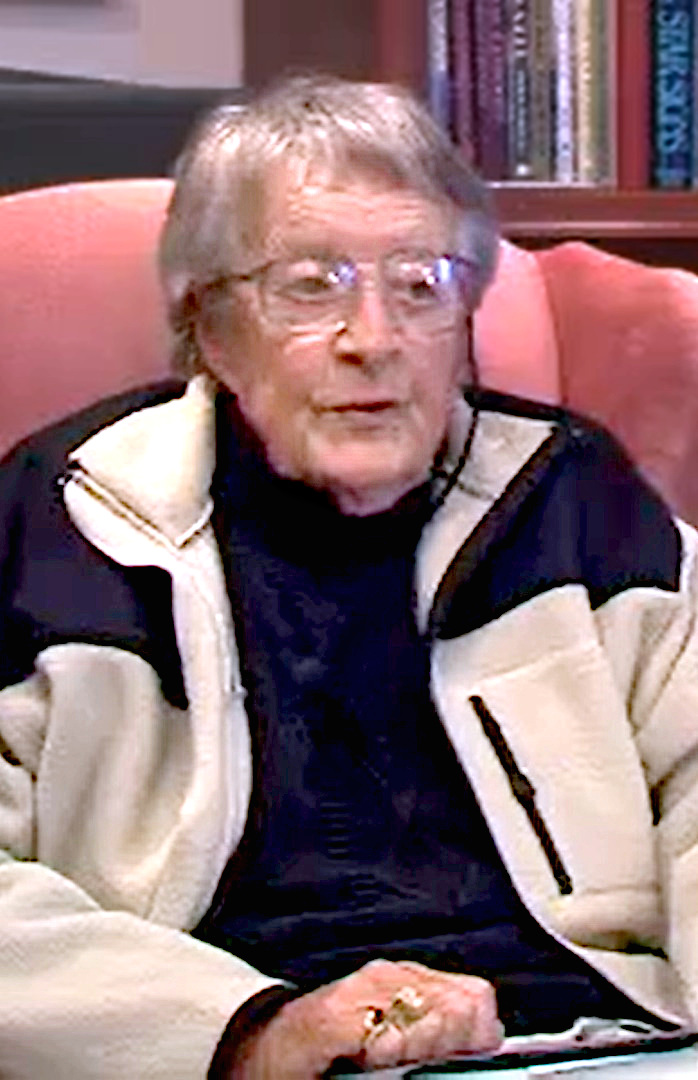
- Needles in 2005
- Born: January 2, 1919; Yonkers, New York
- Died: January 12, 2016 (aged 97); Alliston, Ontario
- Education: Kitchener Collegiate Institute; Goodman School of Drama
- Occupations: Actor and teacher
- Years active: 1940–2006
- Spouse: Dorothy-Jane Goulding (m. 1946)

George William Needles CM (January 2, 1919 – January 12, 2016) was an American-born Canadian actor and teacher.

Critic Harry Lane praised his performances for their "apparently effortless intellectual and moral authority, combined with ironic playfulness and rich vocal sensitivity."

== Early years ==
Raised in Kitchener, Ontario, his father, Ira Needles, was president of B.F. Goodrich Canada, a founder (and later chancellor) of the University of Waterloo, and a founder of the Stratford Shakespeare Festival.

Needles later said he chose acting "out of desperation" as a way to avoid going to business school, and so his father, after lecturing him on the pitfalls of the acting profession, insisted that he get the best training possible and sent him to the Goodman School of Drama in Chicago.

Needles joined the United States Army in 1943 and saw active service in the Pacific, first with the 7th Infantry Division in the Aleutian Islands Campaign in August of that year, and later with the New York 27th Infantry as a chaplain's assistant, taking part in the Battle of Okinawa in 1945. In the latter campaign, he recalled focusing on soliloquies from Hamlet and Henry V to keep his sanity.

After the war, he returned to Canada to perform in Toronto, first in radio drama and then television.

== At the Stratford Festival ==
A member of the acting company of the Stratford Festival since its inception in 1953, he has appeared in over one hundred roles with the company, among which are Albany in King Lear (1964 and 1972); the Duke of Venice in The Merchant of Venice (1996); the White King in Alice Through the Looking-Glass (1996); the Lord Mayor in Richard III (1997); the Shepherd in Oedipus Rex (1997); Merriman in The Importance of Being Earnest (2000); Mortimer in Henry VI: Revenge in France (2002). Beginning with the Festival under Sir Tyrone Guthrie, he acted under eight artistic directors over the years. He has also appeared in over twenty motion pictures, including the CBC's Macbeth as Banquo opposite Sean Connery in the title role.

"We learned from listening to those very, very capable English actors reading the verse and acting", he recalls. He gave memorable performances as the Inquisitor in Shaw's Saint Joan and as the Chaplain in Brecht's Mother Courage. He played in London and on stages across the North American continent, including the Manitoba Theatre Centre, South Coast Repertory in Southern California, and in New York. In 1969, he appeared on Broadway in Hadrian VII with Alec McCowen.

In the mid-1950s, the Canadian Actors' Equity Association was approached by the Actors Fund of America to help raise funds for their cause. In an initiative to undertake such work themselves for Canadian actors, Needles, together with Jane Mallett, Barbara Hamilton, Donald Davis and Barry Morse, each put a symbolic dollar into a pot to launch the Actors' Fund of Canada, which supports actors and other members of the theatrical professions in financial need.

== Influence ==
During time when the Festival season was done for the year, he earned a certificate as a Master Teacher cum laude from the University of California, Irvine, where he taught acting for many years at the Claire Trevor School of the Arts. One of his students, Jon Lovitz, stated that Needles "was the nicest teacher, ever", and later based the Saturday Night Live character Master Thespian on him.

Colm Feore recalled his generosity to younger actors, especially noting the 1986 production of A Winter's Tale, when, as Leontes, he had to physically throw Antigonus (played by Needles) around the stage. "When I apologized later he said, 'No, no, dear boy, that's perfectly fine, you must do what you have to do to find the character.' It was such a courageous and kind thing to do."

Feore also noted the impact Needles had on succeeding generations of actors on the Stratford stages:

With his stories, he gave us some comfort, some sense of baton-passing. He was telling us, "Listen, this is not ground that has never been walked over before. You're among friendly ghosts."

== Degrees/honours ==
On November 15, 2000, the Governor General of Canada named Needles a Member of the Order of Canada (CM), stating, "Vital to the heart and soul of the Stratford Festival, he has provided leadership and inspiration there for nearly 50 years." Needles' Stratford company star is located in front of the Knox Presbyterian Church in Stratford.

He received an honorary doctorate (LL.D) from the University of Waterloo. In 2002, he was a Recipient the Queen Elizabeth II Golden Jubilee Medal. In 2012 he was the recipient of the Queen Elizabeth II Diamond Jubilee Medal.

Member of the Order of Canada	2000
Queen Elizabeth II Golden Jubilee Medal	2002
Queen Elizabeth II Diamond Jubilee Medal	2012

== Family ==
He had five children (including arts administrator Jane Needles and playwright Dan Needles), fifteen grandchildren, and three great-grandchildren.
