= Zoe Caldwell =

Australian actress (1933–2020)

Zoe Caldwell OBE
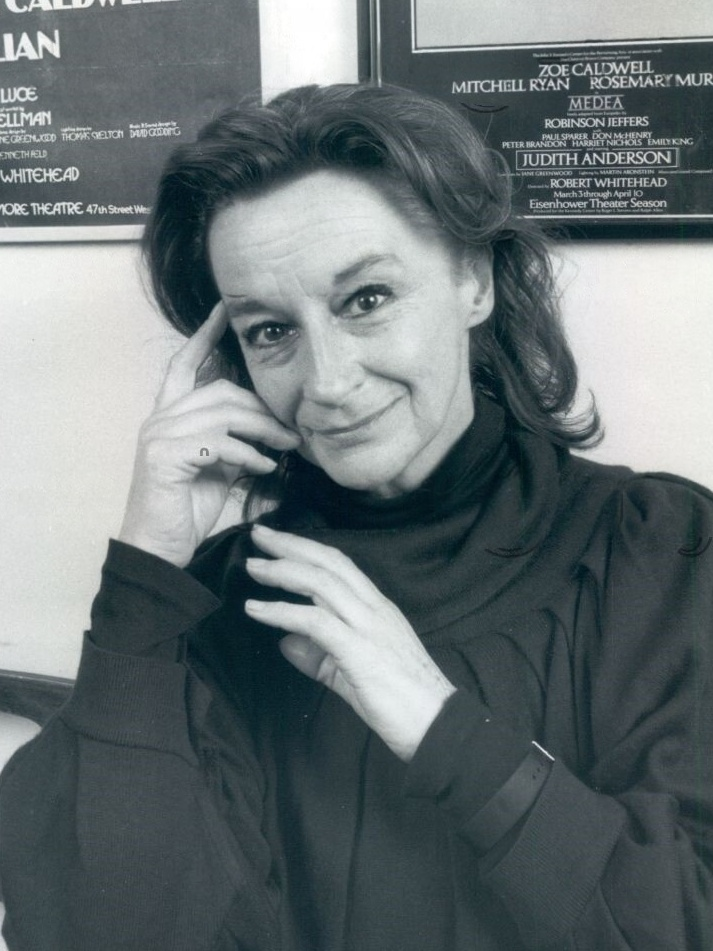
- Caldwell in 1985
- Born: Zoe Ada Caldwell; 14 September 1933; Melbourne, Victoria, Australia
- Died: 16 February 2020 (aged 86); Pound Ridge, New York, U.S.
- Resting place: Pound Ridge Cemetery, Pound Ridge, New York, U.S.
- Education: Methodist Ladies' College, Kew
- Occupation: Actress
- Years active: 1953–2018
- Spouse: Robert Whitehead (m. 1968; died 2002)
- Children: 2
- Awards: Tony Award for Best Featured Actress in a Play

Zoe Ada Caldwell OBE (14 September 1933 – 16 February 2020) was an Australian actress. She was a four-time Tony Award winner, winning Best Featured Actress in a Play for Slapstick Tragedy (1966), and Best Actress in a Play for The Prime of Miss Jean Brodie (1968), Medea (1982), and Master Class (1996). Her film appearances include The Purple Rose of Cairo (1985), Birth (2004), and Extremely Loud & Incredibly Close (2011). She was also known for providing the voice of the Grand Councilwoman in the Lilo & Stitch franchise and in Kingdom Hearts: Birth by Sleep.

== Early life ==
Caldwell was born in Melbourne, and raised in the suburb of Balwyn. Her father, Edgar, was a plumber. Caldwell's mother often took some of the neighbourhood kids to the Elizabethan Theatre in Richmond where they could go backstage and watch rehearsals and performances.

== Career ==
Caldwell began her career in Melbourne in the 1950s and early 1960s, performing with the newly formed Union Theatre Repertory Company (later the Melbourne Theatre Company).

She emigrated to England upon being invited to join the Royal Shakespeare Company at a time when Charles Laughton was attempting to revive Lear, and Vanessa Redgrave, Eileen Atkins, Albert Finney were among the other newcomers in the company. She played Bianca in the 1959 production of Othello, starring Paul Robeson. Later she played the indomitable Helena, opposite Dame Edith Evans in a production of All's Well That Ends Well. Her career later brought her to the United States, where she was one of the original company of actors under Guthrie's direction at the Tyrone Guthrie Theatre in Minneapolis. At the Guthrie, she played parts such as Ophelia in Hamlet and Natasha in Three Sisters.

A life member of the Actors Studio, Caldwell won four Tony Awards for her performances on Broadway in Tennessee Williams' Slapstick Tragedy, The Prime of Miss Jean Brodie, Medea and Master Class. In the last she portrayed opera diva Maria Callas. In Stratford, Ontario, she appeared often, including her role as Cleopatra in Shakespeare's Antony and Cleopatra opposite Christopher Plummer's Mark Antony in 1967.

Her other credits on Broadway include Arthur Miller's The Creation of the World and Other Business in which she played Eve, a one-woman play by William Luce based on the life of Lillian Hellman and a production of Macbeth with Christopher Plummer as Macbeth and Glenda Jackson as Lady Macbeth under Caldwell's direction. Caldwell directed, Off-Broadway, a two-woman play, created by Eileen Atkins, Vita and Virginia, based on the letters between Virginia Woolf and Vita Sackville-West. Atkins played Virginia and Vanessa Redgrave played Vita. Caldwell directed the Broadway production of Othello in the late 1970s with James Earl Jones, Christopher Plummer, and Dianne Wiest. She helmed the American Shakespeare Theatre in Stratford, Connecticut, for two limited-run seasons as its artistic director in the mid-1980s.

Caldwell also performed on film, most notably as an imperious dowager in Woody Allen's The Purple Rose of Cairo. She voiced the character of the Grand Councilwoman in Disney's Lilo & Stitch, and continued voicing the character in the franchise's later films and in Lilo & Stitch: The Series, as well as in Kingdom Hearts Birth by Sleep. In 2011, she acted in Extremely Loud & Incredibly Close.

== Personal life ==
Caldwell graduated from Methodist Ladies' College, Kew, and, much later, received an honorary degree from the University of Melbourne. In 1968, she married Canadian-born Broadway producer Robert Whitehead, a cousin of actor Hume Cronyn. They had two sons and were married until Whitehead's death in June 2002.

== Honours ==
In 1970, Caldwell was appointed an Officer of the Order of the British Empire by The Queen.

== Death ==
Caldwell died in Pound Ridge, New York, on 16 February 2020, aged 86, of complications from Parkinson's disease.

== Filmography ==
=== Film ===
Year	Title	Role	Notes
1962	Festival in Adelaide	Saint Joan	
1985	The Purple Rose of Cairo	The Countess	
2002	Lilo & Stitch	Grand Councilwoman	Voice
2003	Stitch! The Movie	Grand Councilwoman	Voice, direct-to-video
2004	Birth	Mrs. Hill	
2004	Stitch's Great Escape!	Grand Councilwoman	Voice, short
2006	Leroy & Stitch	Grand Councilwoman	Voice, direct-to-video
2011	Extremely Loud & Incredibly Close	Oskar's Grandmother	(final film role)

=== Television ===
Year	Title	Role	Notes
1959	A Midsummer Night's Dream	Fairy	TV movie
1960	BBC Sunday Night Play	Ruth Honeywill	Episode: "Twentieth Century Theatre: Justice"
1960	ITV Playhouse	Louise	Episode: "The Song of Louise in the Morning"
1960	Suspense	Kathy Harrison	Episode: "Flight 404"
1960	Theatre 70		Episode: "The Neighbour"
1961	Macbeth	Lady Macbeth	TV movie, CBC, Canada; Sean Connery, Macbeth
1963	Festival		Episode: "The Doctor's Dilemma"
1964	Playdate	Streetwalker	Episode: "A Night Out"
1964	Dear Liar	Mrs. Patrick Campbell	TV movie
1968	The Secret of Michelangelo	Narrator	TV movie
1971	Great Performances	Sarah Bernhardt	Episode: "Sarah ... Sarah Bernhardt"
1978	Play of the Month	Mme. Arkadina	Episode: "The Seagull"
1983	Medea	Medea	TV movie
1986	American Masters	Carlotta Monterey O'Neill	Episode: "Eugene O'Neill: A Glory of Ghosts"
1989	Lantern Hill	Mrs. Kennedy	TV movie
1990	Road to Avonlea	Old Lady Lloyd	Episode: "Old Lady Lloyd"
2003	Lilo & Stitch: The Series	Grand Councilwoman	Voice, Episode: "Finder"

=== Theatre credits ===
Year	Title	Role	Notes
1958	Romeo and Juliet	unnamed parts	Shakespeare Memorial Theatre
1958	Twelfth Night	unnamed parts	Shakespeare Memorial Theatre
1958	Hamlet	unnamed parts	Shakespeare Memorial Theatre
1958	Pericles	Antiochus' Daughter, unnamed parts	Shakespeare Memorial Theatre
1958	Much Ado About Nothing	Margaret	Shakespeare Memorial Theatre
1958	Hamlet	unnamed parts	USSR tour
1958	Romeo and Juliet	unnamed parts	USSR tour
1958	Twelfth Night	unnamed parts	USSR tour
1959	Othello	Bianca	Shakespeare Memorial Theatre
1959	All's Well That Ends Well	Helena	Shakespeare Memorial Theatre
1959	A Midsummer Night's Dream	Fairy	Shakespeare Memorial Theatre
1959	King Lear	Cordelia	Shakespeare Memorial Theatre
1961	The Changeling	Isabella	Royal Court Theatre
1961	Love's Labour's Lost	Rosaline	Festival Theatre
1965	The Devils	Sister Jean of the Angels – replacement	Broadway Theatre
1966	Slapstick Tragedy	Polly	Longacre Theater – Tony Award
1967	Richard III	Lady Anne	Festival Theatre
1967	The Merry Wives of Windsor	Mistress Page	Festival Theatre
1967	Antony and Cleopatra	Cleopatra	Festival Theatre; Expo Theatre
1968	The Prime of Miss Jean Brodie	Jean Brodie	Helen Hayes Theater – Tony Award
1972	The Creation of the World and Other Business	Eve	Shubert Theater
1974	Dance of Death	Alice	Vivian Beaumont Theater
1977	An Almost Perfect Person	Director	Belasco Theater
1979	Richard II	Director	Avon Theatre
1982	Medea	Medea	Cort Theater – Tony Award
1986	Lillian	Lillian	Ethel Barrymore Theater
1988	Macbeth	Director	Mark Hellinger Theatre
1991	Park Your Car In Harvard Yard	Director	Music Box Theater
1995–1997	Master Class	Maria Callas	John Golden Theater – Tony Award
2003	The Play What I Wrote	Mystery Guest Star – replacement	Lyceum Theater
2003	The Visit	Claire Zachanassian	Melbourne Theatre Company

=== Video games ===
Year	Title	Role	Notes
2002	Disney's Stitch: Experiment 626	Grand Councilwoman	Deleted role; credit only
2010	Kingdom Hearts Birth by Sleep	Grand Councilwoman	

== Bibliography ==
- Caldwell, Zoe (2002). I Will be Cleopatra: An Actress's Journey. New York: W. W. Norton. ISBN 978-0393323603.

== Awards and nominations ==
Awards and nominations
Award	Year	Category	Work	Result	Ref.
Tony Awards	1966	Best Featured Actress in a Play	Slapstick Tragedy	Won	
Tony Awards	1968	Best Actress in a Play	The Prime of Miss Jean Brodie	Won	
Tony Awards	1982	Best Actress in a Play	Medea	Won	
Tony Awards	1996	Best Actress in a Play	Master Class	Won	
Drama Desk Awards	1970	Outstanding Performance	Colette	Won	
Drama Desk Awards	1982	Outstanding Actress in a Play	Medea	Won	
Drama Desk Awards	1996	Outstanding Actress in a Play	Master Class	Won	
