= Jane Mallett =

Canadian actress (1899–1984)

- Born: April 17, 1899; London, Ontario, Canada
- Died: April 14, 1984 (aged 84); Toronto, Ontario, Canada
- Occupation: actor

Jane Mallett, nee Jean Dawson Keenleyside (April 17, 1899 – April 14, 1984) was a Canadian actress. Mallett began her career in the 1920s in live theatre, and adapted to radio, television and film during her career. She was a dependable, well-known, well-liked character actor. She had "a pronounced gift for comedy."

== Career ==
Mallett was born on April 17, 1899 in London, Ontario, Canada, the oldest of eight children. She grew up in Regina, Saskatchewan and then studied at Victoria College at the University of Toronto. In 1926, she married Frederick Mallett.

Mallett began her career in 1927 at the Empire Theatre in Toronto, as a member of the stock company, working 40 weeks per year until it closed in 1931. Mallett later reminisced about her first role: "[it] had a very funny three lines that got a laugh. I can still see that stage, and I knew I wanted to act". Mallett's stage career included performances with Ontario's Shaw Festival and Stratford Festival, and Toronto's Hart House Theatre, Victoria Theatre, New Play Society (notably in their Spring Thaw comedy revues) and Crest Theatre. Her last performance on stage was in 1976, performing in Hugh Leonard's Da for Theatre Compact.

With the development of radio and television, Mallett adapted and found work with the CBC. Mallett was a stalwart on CBC Radio from the 1940s to the 1970s, working with such notables as Andrew Allan, John Drainie, and Barry Morse. Mallett took part in the first network radio broadcast by the CBC. She was most noted for Travels with Aunt Jane, a 1974 CBC Radio comedy series in which she portrayed the character of "Aunt Jane", an unmarried woman who travelled across Canada to visit her relatives. Television producer Jack Humphrey also created a pilot for a television version of Aunt Jane in 1977, but the show was not picked up to series. Mallett also participated in the launch of CBC-TV.

Mallett also worked in film. Her films included Love at First Sight, The Sweet and the Bitter, The Yellow Leaf, Nothing Personal, and Improper Channels.

Mallett was president and co-founder of the benevolent Actors' Fund of Canada, and served on the board of directors for the Alliance of Canadian Cinema, Television and Radio Artists (ACTRA) union.

== Honours ==
She was named a Member of the Order of Canada in 1975. In 1976, she was a recipient of ACTRA's John Drainie Award.

Following her death due to emphysema in 1984 (three days before her 85th birthday), she was posthumously celebrated in Toronto by the naming of a theatre in her honour at the St. Lawrence Centre for the Arts. The Jane Mallett Theatre is a 498-seat venue, with a semi-circular thrust stage, used for concerts, theatrical productions and audiovisual presentations.

== Filmography ==
| Year | Title | Role | Notes |
|---|---|---|---|
| 1967 | The Sweet and the Bitter | Mrs. MacDonald | |
| 1971 | The Megantic Outlaw | Morrison's mother | |
| 1974 | Sweet Movie | Mrs. Alplanalpe | |
| 1976 | Love at First Sight | Grandma | |
| 1980 | Nothing Personal | Little Old Lady | |
| 1981 | Improper Channels | Burger King Lady | |
| 1983 | Utilities | Dr. Martha | (final film role) |
