= Douglas Rain =

Canadian actor and narrator (1928–2018)

- Rain in 1968
- Born: Douglas James Rain; May 9, 1928; Winnipeg, Manitoba, Canada
- Died: November 11, 2018 (aged 90); St. Marys, Ontario, Canada
- Education: University of Manitoba; Banff School of Fine Arts; Old Vic Theatre School
- Occupations: Actor, voice actor
- Known for: Voice of HAL 9000 in 2001: A Space Odyssey (1968)
- Spouse(s): Lois Shaw; Martha Henry
- Children: 3
- Awards: Dora Mavor Moore Award

Douglas James Rain (May 9, 1928 – November 11, 2018) was a Canadian actor. Although primarily a stage actor, he is best known for voicing HAL 9000, the supercomputer in the film 2001: A Space Odyssey (1968) and its sequel 2010: The Year We Make Contact (1984). He co-founded the Stratford Festival, and was nominated for a Tony Award for the Broadway play Vivat! Vivat Regina!.

== Early life ==
Rain was born in Winnipeg, Manitoba, to Scottish parents Mary and James Rain. His father was a rail yard switchman and his mother was a nurse. His parents emigrated to Canada from Glasgow, Scotland.

He graduated with a B.A. from the University of Manitoba in 1950, then studied acting at the Banff School of Fine Arts in Banff, Alberta and the Old Vic Theatre School in London, England.

== Career ==
Rain was a founding member of the Stratford Festival of Canada in 1953 and was associated with it as an actor until 1998.

He performed a wide variety of theatrical roles, such as a production of Henry V staged in Stratford, Ontario, that was adapted for television in 1966. In 1972, he was nominated for the Tony Award for Best Supporting or Featured Actor (Dramatic) for his performance in Vivat! Vivat Regina!

=== Voice of the HAL 9000 computer ===
Stanley Kubrick cast Rain as the voice of the HAL 9000 computer for the film 2001: A Space Odyssey (1968) after hearing his narration of a short documentary titled Universe and later chose him as "the creepy voice of HAL". Rain produced all of his lines during the post-production, in a ten-hour recording session over two days with Kubrick in London. He did not think the recording session went well, later saying: "If you could have been a ghost at the recording you would have thought it was a load of rubbish." In the film, his voice was sometimes processed with an electronic device called the Eltro information rate changer. In an interview with the New York Times in 2018, Rain said that he had never seen the movie.

Rain reprised the role for the sequel 2010: The Year We Make Contact (1984). He also briefly parodied it in a sketch on Second City Television where Merv Griffin (played by Rick Moranis) takes his talk show into outer space.

== Personal life and death ==
Rain was married twice, first to Lois Shaw and then to Martha Henry, who was also an actress on stage, film and television, and had three children and a grandchild. He died of natural causes on November 11, 2018, at the age of 90, at St. Mary's Memorial Hospital in St. Marys, Ontario.

== Filmography ==
=== Films ===
Year	Title	Role	Notes
1956	Christmas in the Market Place	Joey	TV film
1957	Oedipus Rex	Messenger	
1960	The Hill	Jesus	
1960	Universe	Narrator	Short film
1961	One Plus One		Segment: The Divorcee
1961	William Lyon Mackenzie: A Friend to His Country	William Lyon Mackenzie	Short film (documentary)
1961	Robert Baldwin: A Matter of Principle	William Lyon Mackenzie	Short film (documentary)
1964	Twelfth Night		TV film
1964	Fields of Sacrifice	Narrator	Short film (documentary)
1966	Henry V	Henry V	TV film
1968	2001: A Space Odyssey	HAL 9000	Voice
1973	The Russian-German War	Narrator	Documentary
1974	The Man Who Skied Down Everest	Narrator	Documentary
1984	2010: The Year We Make Contact	Hal 9000	Voice
1985	Love and Larceny	Ashton Fletcher	TV film

=== Television ===
Year	Title	Role	Notes
1960	Just Mary		Voice
1960	The Night They Killed Joe Howe	Joseph Howe	
1963	The Other Man	David Henderson	Miniseries
1971	Talking to a Stranger	voice	Miniseries
1976	One Canadian: The Political Memoirs of the Rt. Hon. John G. Diefenbaker	Narrator	Documentary
1982	SCTV	HAL 9000	Voice
