= Tony Van Bridge =

British actor and director

Valentine Anthony Neil "Tony Van" Bridge CM (28 May 1917 – 20 December 2004) was a British television and theatre actor and director.

== Early life ==
Bridge was born in London, the son of Arthur Stanley Bridge, a lighterage contractor, and his wife Edith Christina Maud Drane. His grandfather, Arthur Bridge, was a coal merchant. He first appeared as a child actor at the age of ten, and enrolled aged 19 at the Royal Academy of Dramatic Art.

== Career ==
Bridge worked for fifteen years with the Stratford Shakespeare Festival, and thirty years with the Shaw Festival. He was interim artistic director at Shaw for the 1974–75 season.

On 27 April 2000, Bridge was made a Member of the Order of Canada for his services to the performing arts.

== Personal life ==
Bridge married Kippe Cammaerts, an actress, just before the Second World War. They had two children, Pieter and author Michael Morpurgo. While he was away during World War II, his wife met Jack Morpurgo and started a relationship with him. Bridge returned to England in 1946 and shortly thereafter decided to emigrate to Canada.

Bridge had three further children in Canada – Shona Bridge, David Cheyne and Peter Cheyne.

Bridge died 20 December 2004 in Niagara-on-the-Lake, Ontario. He was survived by his ex-wife Stacey and predeceased by his second wife Elizabeth Bridge and his first wife Kippe Cammaerts.

== Television (partial) ==
- The Quatermass Experiment (1953), producer
- The Avengers (1961), Henry Burge
- Playdate (1961–62)
  - "Masterpiece" (1961), Raiyler
  - "Love Story 1910" (1962), Inspector Dew
  - "Great Expectations" (1962), Magwitch
  - "The Old One" (1962) (and writer)
- Mission: Impossible (1969), Erhard Poltzin
- A Population of One (1980)
