= Festival (Canadian TV series) season 4 =

Festival
- Season 4
- No. of episodes: 29

Release
- Original network: CBC
- Original release: 2 October 1963 – 24 June 1964

Season chronology
- ← Previous; Season 3 Next → Season 5

The fourth season of Festival aired from 2 October 1963 to 24 June 1964. Twenty-nine new episodes were produced for this season.

== Synopsis ==
William Shakespeare is highlighted this season, commemorating the quatercentenary of his 1564 birth, traditionally observed 23 April (despite his baptism on the 26th). Preparation began in 1963 with the BBC TV / Danmarks Radio co-production of Hamlet at Elsinore on location at Kronsberg Castle in Helsingør, Denmark, starring Christopher Plummer, who first played Prince Hamlet seven years prior with the Stratford Festival, Ontario. Hamlet at Elsinore debuted as a three-hour Festival special on 15 April 1964. In the U.K., BBC broadcast it on 19 April 1964. Additionally, Robert Allen adapted Shakespeare's Twelfth Night for a Stratford Shakespeare Festival stage production, broadcast as a two-hour, thirty-minute Festival special on 8 April 1964. Further, Verdi's opera Otello based on Shakespeare's play Othello re-aired on 22 April 1964 as a two-hour, fifteen-minute special. Two of Molière's 1666 plays are represented; his farce Le Médecin malgré lui, performed in French by Théâtre du Nouveau Monde, and his comedy of manners play Le Misanthrope adapted as a musical called The Slave of Truth by Miles Malleson and Stan Daniels. Also adapted was, James Hogg's novel The Private Memoirs and Confessions of a Justified Sinner (1824), Turgenev's novella First Love (1860), and Alexander Ostrovsky's 19th-century Russian comedy Diary of a Scoundrel (1868). Chekhov's play Uncle Vanya (1899) and Shaw's drama Major Barbara (1905) are performed. Modern offerings include, Fletcher Markle's television adaptation of Katherine Anne Porter's short novel, Pale Horse, Pale Rider (1939); Jean Anouilh's modern version of Oedipus' daughter, Antigone (1944); Max Frisch's radio play The Firebugs (1953), and Arnold Wesker's 1958 play Roots. Executive producer Robert Allen introduces John Mortimer's I Spy and N. F. Simpson's A Resounding Tinkle. Jack Pulman's Still Life, Bernard Slade's A Very Close Family, and Charles Israel's The Labyrinth also aired.

Festival also celebrates the 100th birthday of Richard Strauss in three episodes, with his compositions performed by the CBC Symphony Orchestra, soprano Lois Marshall, baritone Hermann Prey, pianist John Wustman, with Dr. Heinz Unger (conductor); Vienna Philharmonic concert master Willi Boskovsky directs CBC L'Heure du concert orchestra with German soprano Elisabeth Schwarzkopf; and Zubin Mehta conducts the Montreal Symphony Orchestra at Place des Arts performing Strauss' Ein Heldenleben with Calvin Sieb and Joseph Masella. Frenchman composer Pierre Boulez also conducts the CBC L'Heure du concert orchestra performing Stravinsky, Debussy, and Boulez's own work. Dr. Wilfrid Pelletier and the Toronto Symphony Orchestra present talented young Canadians in concert; baritone Victor Braun, conductor Boris Brott, award-winning Pierre Hétu, pianist Diedre Irons, soprano Sheila Piercey, and oboist Jacques Simard. Canadian pianist Glenn Gould performs Beethoven, Sweelinck, J.S. Bach and Webern. Chilean Claudio Arrau plays piano sonatas by Mozart and Beethoven, and a variety of performers play music "miniatures" by Mozart, Webern, Schumann, Enrique Granados, Stravinsky's, Brahms, Debussy, Haydn, and Claudio Monteverdi.

The fourth season premiered with a Gilbert and Sullivan comedic opera, The Mikado (1885), a Japanese fantasy that satirises British institutions, society and politics. Avon Theatre players performed to a live studio theatre audience, with music conducted by Louis Applebaum, featuring Maurice Brown as The Mikado, and nine singers including Eric House, Howell Glynne, and Heather Thomson. This is the fourth running season to feature a Gilbert and Sullivan production. Australian dramatic coloratura soprano Joan Sutherland presents historic opera roles, with tenor-baritone Richard Conrad, and Richard Bonynge conducting the CBC Symphony Orchestra. Selections include Benedict, Bellini, Donizetti, Ricci, Rossini, and Verdi. Claude Kenneson conducts the Winnipeg Symphony Orchestra and CBC Symphony Orchestra as Arnold Spohr leads the Royal Winnipeg Ballet in two performances; George Balanchine's ballet Pas de Dix and Agnes de Mille's The Bitter Weird with music by Trude Rittmann. A "triple play" of styles presents: ballet choreography by Ray Powell and performed by the National Ballet of Canada to music by Josef Strauss; folk songs by Ian Tyson and Sylvia Tyson; and jazz compositions by Phil Nimmons.

== Notable guest cast ==
In addition to individuals cast this season, organizations include the CBC Symphony Orchestra, the Montreal Symphony Orchestra, the Toronto Symphony Orchestra, the Winnipeg Symphony Orchestra, the Juilliard String Quartet, the National Ballet of Canada, the Royal Winnipeg Ballet, the Avon Theatre players from the Stratford Festival, and the Théâtre du Nouveau Monde company in Montreal.

- Sharon Acker
- Claus Adam
- Robert Aitken
- Claudio Arrau
- Ivor Barry
- Perry Bauman
- Michael Bawtree
- Mario Bernardi
- Len Birman
- Richard Bonynge
- Willi Boskovsky
- Tom Bosley
- Pierre Boulez
- Victor Braun
- Boris Brott
- Helen Burns
- W. B. Brydon
- Barbara Byrne
- Douglas Campbell
- Richard Cassilly
- Isidore Cohen
- Patricia Collins
- Richard Conrad
- Michael Crawford
- Jack Creley
- Peter Donat
- James Doohan
- Melvyn Douglas
- John Drainie
- Keir Dullea
- Rita Gam
- Gabriel Gascon
- Jean Gascon
- Bruno Gerussi
- Howell Glynne
- Glenn Gould
- Suzanne Grossmann
- Sheila Henig
- Martha Henry
- Pierre Hétu
- Raphael Hillyer
- Eric House
- William Hutt
- Frances Hyland
- Diedre Irons
- Elmer Iseler
- Lou Jacobi
- Charmion King
- Tom Kneebone
- Guy L'Écuyer
- Michael Learned
- Cosette Lee
- René Lévesque
- Monique Leyrac
- Jane Mallett
- Robert Mann
- Lois Marshall
- Joseph Masella
- Paul Massie
- Roberta Maxwell
- Neil McCallum
- John McCollum
- Geraldine McEwan
- Ed McNamara
- Zubin Mehta
- James Mitchell
- Richard Monette
- William Needles
- Louis Negin
- Phil Nimmons
- Gerard Parkes
- Wilfrid Pelletier
- Gordon Pinsent
- Christopher Plummer
- Hermann Prey
- Louis Quilico
- Douglas Rain
- Henry Ramer
- Norma Renault
- Toby Robins
- Jean-Louis Roux
- Jan Rubeš
- Elisabeth Schwarzkopf
- Heather Sears
- Calvin Sieb
- Ruth Springford
- Sydney Sturgess
- Joan Sutherland
- Powys Thomas
- Heather Thomson
- Ian Tyson
- Sylvia Tyson
- Jean Vallerand
- Tony Van Bridge
- John Vernon
- Hugh Webster
- Donald Whitton
- Nancy Wickwire
- Chris Wiggins
- Gordon Wry

== Episodes ==
Notes:

- Weeks not indicated were pre-empted by special broadcasts such as Camera Canada, Horizon or Intertel.
- In some but not all markets, NHL hockey playoffs pre-empted the Festival episode "Twelfth Night" on 8 April 1964.
- "Pale Horse, Pale Rider" aired twice this season; 23 October 1963, and 18 March 1964.
- "Diary of a Scoundrel" aired twice this season; 25 December 1963, and 1 April 1964.
- The week of 15 April 1964, Festival was broadcast as a Special Edition at 8:30 PM EST to accommodate the 3-hour (170 minute) debut of the BBC TV / Danmarks Radio co-production of Hamlet at Elsinore to commemorate Shakespeare's 400th birthday.
- "Othello" re-aired this season on 22 April 1964 in honour of Shakespeare's 400th birthday. It originally aired in season three on 22 April 1963. Its duration of 2 hours and 15 minutes is substantially longer than other episodes (60-90 minutes).

No. overall	No. in season	Title	Directed by	Written by	Original release date	Ref.
76	1	"The Mikado"	Norman Campbell	Gilbert and Sullivan	2 October 1963	
Please add a Plot Summary here, replacing this text. For guidance, see How to write a plot summary. Episode summaries must be expressed in your own words. Do NOT submit content you find from another web site as it is plagiarism and likely a copyright violation, which Wikipedia cannot accept and will be removed or reverted. Superficially modifying copyrighted content or closely paraphrasing it, even if the source is cited, still constitutes a copyright violation. As per Television Plot Manual of Style,^{MOS:TVPLOT} summaries should be about 100 to 200 words in length, and those substantially less than 100 words are most likely to be scrutinized for possible copyright violation. Cast: Eric House (Koko, The Lord High Executioner of Titipu), Andrew Downie (Nanki-Poo), Howell Glynne (Pooh-Bah), Irene Byatt (Katisha), Arthur Sclater (Pish-Tush), Heather Thomson (Yum-Yum), Kathryn Newman (Pitti-Sing), Anne Linden (Peep-Bo), Maurice Brown (The Mikado of Japan), and a group of nine singers.
77	2	"Antigone"	Paul Almond	Jean Anouilh	9 October 1963	
Please add a Plot Summary here, replacing this text. For guidance, see How to write a plot summary and Television Plot Manual of Style.^{MOS:TVPLOT} Cast: Douglas Rain, Suzanne Grossmann, Sharon Acker, Budd Knapp, Dino Narizzano, Lynne Gorman, Sydney Sturgess, and John Vernon
78	3	"The Labyrinth"	Paul Almond	Charles Israel	16 October 1963	
Please add a Plot Summary here, replacing this text. For guidance, see How to write a plot summary and Television Plot Manual of Style.^{MOS:TVPLOT} Cast: James Doohan, Alice Hill, Budd Knapp, Arch McDonnell, Janis Orenstein.
79	4	"Pale Horse, Pale Rider"	Eric Till	Novel by : Katherine Anne Porter; Adapted by : Fletcher Markle	23 October 1963	
Please add a Plot Summary here, replacing this text. For guidance, see How to write a plot summary and Television Plot Manual of Style.^{MOS:TVPLOT} Cast: Joan Hackett, Keir Dullea, John Drainie, Ruth Springford, Deborah Turnbull, and Arch McDonell.
80	5	"Le Médecin malgré lui"	Jean Gascon	Molière	30 October 1963	
Please add a Plot Summary here, replacing this text. For guidance, see How to write a plot summary and Television Plot Manual of Style.^{MOS:TVPLOT} Notes: Introduced by René Lévesque, players from Théâtre du Nouveau Monde, Montreal perform in French. Cast: Guy Hoffman, Monique Leyrac, Jean Gascon, Pierre Theriault, Guy L'Écuyer, Monique Joly, Gabriel Gascon, Jean Dalmain, Germaine Giroux, and Jean-Louis Roux.
81	6	"Viennese Night"	Pierre Mercure	Unknown	6 November 1963	
Filmed in Montreal, Vienna Philharmonic concert master Willi Boskovsky directs the CBC L'Heure du concert orchestra à la Richard Strauss, playing violin while conducting. The performance features German soprano Elisabeth Schwarzkopf.
82	7	"I Spy"	David Garnder	John Mortimer	13 November 1963	
82	7	"A Resounding Tinkle"	David Garnder	N. F. Simpson	13 November 1963	
I Spy: During divorce proceedings, a detective is hired to implicate the wife in an affair to sway the court in the husband's favor, but the detective falls in love with her. A Resounding Tinkle: A suburban British couple, Bro and Middie Paradock, order an elephant, which of course is too large, so they order a snake, but of course, it's too short. Other absurd and humorous twists occur, unsurprisingly. Cast: I Spy; Eric House, Hilary Vernon, Ivor Barry, Henry Comor, and Barbara Byrne. A Resounding Tinkle; Eric House, Helen Burns, Patricia Collins, Michael Bawtree, and Ian Thorne. Notes: Executive producer Robert Allen introduces the two, one-act plays.
83	8	"Pierre Boulez, Frenchman, Composer, Conductor"	Pierre Mercure	Music by : Stravinsky · Pierre Boulez · Debussy; Poem by : Stéphane Mallarmé	20 November 1963	
French composer Pierre Boulez in his North American television debut, conducts the CBC L'Heure du concert orchestra in an hour-long concert. Igor Stravinsky: Le Sacre du printemps (The Rite of Spring) · Boulez: Une Dentelle S'abolit, an improvisation of a French poem by Stéphane Mallarmé for orchestra and soprano, performed by Montreal's Josèphe Colle (soprano) · Claude Debussy: Danses sacrée et profane (Dances for Harp and String Orchestra), featuring harpist Marie Iosch. The performance was previously broadcast on Radio-Canada.
84	9	"The Slave of Truth"	Norman Campbell	Play by : Molière; English v. by : Miles Malleson; Music/Lyrics by : Stan Daniels	27 November 1963	
Please add a Plot Summary here, replacing this text. For guidance, see How to write a plot summary and Television Plot Manual of Style.^{MOS:TVPLOT} Notes: Musical adaptation of Le Misanthrope. Cast: James B. Douglas, Leo Ciceri, Toby Robins, Tom Kneebone, Michael Learned, Marigold Charlesworth, Norman Welsh, Joseph Shaw, Leo Leyden, Gordon Pinsent, Louis Negin, and Al Kuzlik.
85	10	"Roots"	Harvey Hart	Play by : Arnold Wesker; Adapted by : Henry Comor	4 December 1963	
Please add a Plot Summary here, replacing this text. For guidance, see How to write a plot summary and Television Plot Manual of Style.^{MOS:TVPLOT} Cast: Geraldine McEwan, Marjory Withers, Powys Thomas, Chris Wiggins, W. B. Brydon, Vanya Franck, Dawn Greenhalgh, Alan Nunn, and James Beggs.
86	11	"A Primer on Prima Donnas"	Irving Guttman	Unknown	11 December 1963	
"An Evening with Joan" in her Canadian television debut, Australian dramatic coloratura soprano Joan Sutherland recollects historic opera, with informal conversation and performances of famous roles. She is joined in two duets by tenor-baritone Richard Conrad. Sutherland's husband Richard Bonynge conducts the CBC Symphony Orchestra. Selections include Benedict, Vincenzo Bellini, Gaetano Donizetti, Ricci, Gioachino Rossini, and an excerpt from Giuseppe Verdi's La Traviata.
87	12	"Diary of a Scoundrel"	Eric Till	Play by : Alexander Ostrovsky; Translated by : Rodney Ackland; Adapted by : Tony Van Bridge	25 December 1963	
Please add a Plot Summary here, replacing this text. For guidance, see How to write a plot summary and Television Plot Manual of Style.^{MOS:TVPLOT} Genre: 19th century Russian comedy. Cast: Peter Donat (Gloumov), Tony van Bridge (Mamaev), Norma Renault (Kleopatra), Paul Harding (Gorodoulin), Margot Christie (Madame Tourasina), Julie Rekai (Mashenka), Gerard Parkes (Kroutitsky), Len Birman (Kourchaev), Hilary Vernon (Madame Gloumov), and Hugh Webster (Styopka).
88	13	"Still Life"	Eric Till	Jack Pulman	1 January 1964	
Please add a Plot Summary here, replacing this text. For guidance, see How to write a plot summary and Television Plot Manual of Style.^{MOS:TVPLOT} Cast:Nancy Wickwire (Jane), Michael Crawford (Barney), Budd Knapp (Karl), Frank Aldous (Charlie), Rex Sevenoaks (Bobby Pierce).
89	14	"Major Barbara"	George McCowan	George Bernard Shaw	8 January 1964	
Please add a Plot Summary here, replacing this text. For guidance, see How to write a plot summary and Television Plot Manual of Style.^{MOS:TVPLOT} Cast: Frances Hyland (Major Barbara), Gillie Fenwick (Andrew Undershaft), Frank Perry, Moya Fenwick, John Horton, Tom Kneebone, Eric House, Ed McNamara, Michael Learned, Suzanne Grossmann, and Ruth Springford.
90	15	"First Love"	Mario Prizek	Novella by : Ivan Turgenev; Adapted by : George Salverson	22 January 1964	
Please add a Plot Summary here, replacing this text. For guidance, see How to write a plot summary and Television Plot Manual of Style.^{MOS:TVPLOT} Cast: Heather Sears, Richard Monette, Jane Mallett, Ron Hartmann, and Paul Harding.
91	16	"A Very Close Family"	Harvey Hart	Bernard Slade	29 January 1964	
92	17	"Pas de Dix"	Eric Till ^{TV} Arnold Spohr ^{Art}	George Balanchine	5 February 1964	
92	17	"The Bitter Weird"	Eric Till ^{TV} Arnold Spohr ^{Art}	Agnes de Mille; Music by : Trude Rittmann	5 February 1964	
Artistic director Arnold Spohr leads the Royal Winnipeg Ballet in two performances.: Choreographed by George Balanchine, Pas de Dix is a ballet "for ten dancers" – specifically, eight dancers and two soloists, which are Sonia Taverner and Fredric Strobel.; Choreographed by Agnes de Mille, with music by Trude Rittmann, The Bitter Weird is a modern Scottish love story ballet, about two men, as danced by Richard Rutherford and James Mitchell, in love with the same woman, danced by Marilyn Young, and the tragic result of her choice.; Music is performed by the Winnipeg Symphony Orchestra, and the CBC Symphony Orchestra, conducted by Claude Kenneson.
93	18	"Young Canadians in Concert"	Unknown	Unknown	19 February 1964	
Produced by Franz Kraemer and introduced by Dr. Wilfrid Pelletier, the Toronto Symphony Orchestra presents talented young Canadians in concert. Windsor-born baritone Victor Braun, a member of the Canadian Opera Company since 1956, won Vienna's International Mozart Competition. Nineteen year-old Boris Brott, who has assisted Pierre Monteux in Europe, is a conductor for the Montreal Symphony Orchestra (MSO). The assistant conductor of the MSO, twenty-seven year-old Pierre Hétu, won first prize in France at the 1961 International Competition for Young Conductors. Eighteen year-old concert pianist Diedre Irons made her debut this year at the Winnipeg Symphony Orchestra. Since 1957, Halifax-born soprano Sheila Piercey has been a member of the Canadian Opera Company performing on CBC Radio and CBC Television. Twenty-two year-old Quebec City oboist Jacques Simard also performs.
94	19	"Uncle Vanya"	David Gardner	Anton Chekhov	26 February 1964	
Please add a Plot Summary here, replacing this text. For guidance, see How to write a plot summary and Television Plot Manual of Style.^{MOS:TVPLOT} Cast: William Hutt, Patrick Boxill, Eric House, John Vernon, Rita Gam, Roberta Maxwell, Nan Stewart, and Winifred Dennis.
95	20	"Invitation to Place des Arts"	Unknown	Richard Strauss	4 March 1964	
In the Grande Salle of its new performing arts center, Place des Arts, the 91-member Montreal Symphony Orchestra inaugurated its 30th season with its first resident conductor, twenty-seven year-old Indian Zubin Mehta, in a demanding six-movement orchestral performance of Richard Strauss' 1898 symphonic tone poem A Hero's Life, English for Ein Heldenleben. Opus 40 comprises thirty-plus quotations from Also sprach Zarathustra Op. 30, Till Eulenspiegel Op. 28, Don Quixote Op. 35, Don Juan Op. 20, and Death and Transfiguration Op. 24, which is read by Henri Bergeron. Featured, is soloist Calvin Sieb (violin) and Joseph Masella (French horn). Composer Jean Vallerand, a music critic for La Presse, Montreal, introduces the program and interviews Mehta.
96	21	"The Firebugs"	Unknown	Play by : Max Frisch; Translated by : Mordecai Gorelik; Adapted by : John Bethune	11 March 1964	
Please add a Plot Summary here, replacing this text. For guidance, see How to write a plot summary and Television Plot Manual of Style.^{MOS:TVPLOT} Cast: Lou Jacobi, John Vernon, Cosette Lee, Patricia Collins, Jack Creley, Gillie Fenwick, Allen Doremus, and Jan Chamberlain.
97	22	"Twelfth Night"	George McCowan	Play by : William Shakespeare; Adapted by : Robert Allen	8 April 1964	
Please add a Plot Summary here, replacing this text. For guidance, see How to write a plot summary and Television Plot Manual of Style.^{MOS:TVPLOT} Cast: Douglas Rain (Malvolio), Michael Learned (Olivia), Douglas Campbell (Sir Toby Belch), Bruno Gerussi (Feste), William Needles (Sir Andrew Aguecheek), Martha Henry (Viola / Cesario), Gordon Pinsent (Sebastian), John Horton (Duke Orsino), Deborah Turnbull (Maria), Jake Dengel (Fabian), Tony Van Bridge (Antonio), Len Birman (Valentine), Graydon Gould (Curio), Max Helpmann, and Arch McDonell. Notes: Producer, George McCowan. Stage production performed at the Stratford, Ontario Shakespeare Festival, and most cast members are Stratford Festival players. Duration: 2 hours, 30 minutes.
98	23	"Hamlet at Elsinore"	Philip Saville	William Shakespeare	15 April 1964	
This special episode of Festival is the debut airing for the BBC TV / Danmarks Radio co-production of Hamlet at Elsinore, which was filmed on location at Kronsberg Castle, the setting of Shakespeare's play in Elsinore, that is, Helsingør, Denmark. It starred Christopher Plummer as Hamlet, a role which he had first played seven years prior as a Stratford Festival player. Fellow stars include, Robert Shaw as Claudius, King of Denmark, Alec Clunes as Polonius, Michael Caine as Horatio, June Tobin as Gertrude, Queen of Denmark, and Jo Maxwell-Muller as Ophelia. The BBC broadcast it in the United Kingdom five days later on 19 April 1964, one week before Shakespeare's 400th birthday.
99	24	"Triple Play"	Norman Campbell	Music by : Strauss II & J. Strauss · Traditionals; Choreography by : Ray Powell; Jazz by : Phil Nimmons	6 May 1964	
Alan Millar hosts a "triple play" that brings together three performance styles: Ballet – Set to the music of Johann Strauss II and his brother Josef Strauss, Ray Powell choreographed his ballet One in Five, which is performed by five dancers from the National Ballet of Canada; Jocelyn Terelle, Jeremy Blanton, Colin Worth, Earl Kraul, and Glenn Gilmour. The act is rooted in commedia dell'arte, depicting a lone clown on a bare stage believing he is the only clown on Earth until the other four clowns arrive, including a girl.; Folk music – Ian Tyson and Sylvia Tyson sing Greey Valley, Farewell to Nova Scotia, Little Beggarman, Ghost Lover, Captain Woodstock, Jealous Lover, and Moonshine.; Jazz – Phil Nimmons 'n' Nine, a ten-piece band, play compositions such as Autobahn, Steve's Theme, and Asarully, and with Ian and Sylvia, Gather Ye Rosebuds.
100	25	"The Private Memoirs and Confessions of a Justified Sinner"	Eric Till	Story by : James Hogg; Teleplay by : Alvin Goldman	13 May 1964	
Please add a Plot Summary here, replacing this text. For guidance, see How to write a plot summary and Television Plot Manual of Style.^{MOS:TVPLOT} Genre: Drama. Subject: Crimes motivated by religious fanaticism. Cast: Neil McCallum, Paul Massie, Gillie Fenwick, Norma Renault, Paul Harding, John Horton, Nancy Mitchell, Jim Thomson, James B. Douglas, Maureen Fitzgerald, and Robert Goodier.
101	26	"Concerti for Four Wednesdays"	Vincent Tovell	Beethoven · Sweelinck · Bach · Webern	3 June 1964	
Canadian pianist Glenn Gould discusses music composition, and performs: Ludwig van Beethoven: Piano Sonata No. 30 in E Major, Op. 109 · Jan Pieterszoon Sweelinck: Fantasia chromatica for Keyboard in D · Johann Sebastian Bach: Nine canons, including the Aria and Quodlibet from the Goldberg Variations · Anton Webern: Variations for Piano, Op. 27
102	27	"A Festival of Miniatures"	Unknown	Unknown	10 June 1964	
A variety of performers play an overview of music "miniatures" – smaller compositions of the great composers, many of which are rarely heard in concert repertoires. Wolfgang Amadeus Mozart: String Quartet No. 20 in D major (K. 499, last movement) · Anton Webern: Movements for String Quartet · Robert Schumann: Warum? from Fantasiestücke, Op. 12 · Enrique Granados: Allegro de concierto in C♯ major, Op. 46 · Igor Stravinsky: Japanese Lyrics · Johannes Brahms: Mainacht · Claude Debussy: Syrinx for solo flute (L. 129) · Stravinsky: Valse from Little Suite · Joseph Haydn: Trio · Claudio Monteverdi: Ecco mormorar l'onde, sung by the Festival Singers, comprising Mary Morrison (soprano), Patricia Rideout, Maurice Brown, Elizabeth Elliott and Gordon Wry with Elmer Iseler (director). Featured performers include: the Juilliard String Quartet with Robert Mann (violin), Isidore Cohen (violin), Raphael Hillyer (viola), and Claus Adam (cello); Sheila Henig (piano); Marilyn Duffus (mezzo-soprano); Nicholas Fiore (flute) and Robert Aitken (flute, composer); a winds ensemble with Stan McCartney (clarinet), Bernard Temoin (clarinet), Ronald Neal (trumpet), Perry Bauman (oboe), Nicholas Kilburn (bassoon) and John McIntyre (piano); and a string quartet with Harvey Siegel (violin), Stan Kolt (violin), John Mair (viola), Donald Whitton (cello) with Mario Bernardi (conductor).
103	28	"Claudio Arrau Concert"	Unknown	Wolfgang Amadeus Mozart · Ludwig van Beethoven	17 June 1964	
Mozart's PianoSonata No. 7 in C major (K. 309/284b) and Beethoven's Piano Sonata No. 9 in C minor (Op. 111) are performed by Chilean pianist Claudio Arrau.
104	29	"100th Birthday of Richard Strauss"	Franz Kraemer	Unknown	24 June 1964	
Dr. Heinz Unger conducts the CBC Symphony Orchestra performing with Lois Marshall (soprano), Hermann Prey (baritone), and John Wustman (piano) in honour of Richard Strauss's 100th Birthday.

Previous: Season 3	List of Festival episodes	Succeeded by Season 5

== Reception ==
In the Spring of 1964, the Festival episode, "Pale Horse, Pale Rider" was nominated for an Emmy Award in the international category.
