= Boston Brigade Band =

Brass and reed band from Boston, Massachusetts

The Boston Brigade Band (1821 – c. 1863) was a brass and reed band that performed in Boston, Massachusetts, and elsewhere in New England. Some of the musical pieces played by the band were subsequently published as sheet music, including "The Mammoth Cod Quickstep" of 1839. The band received acclaim in its day, particularly for its combination of both brass and woodwind instruments.

== History ==
In 1821, at the request of Captain Martin Brimmer, Dan Simpson (proprietor of the Green Dragon tavern) "organized the Boston Brigade Band. ... Maj. Simpson was just the man to carry out successfully Capt. Brimmer's desire, for besides being well acquainted with the few musicians in Boston, he was the popular host of the tavern ... at which many of the old members [of the Green Dragon band] often congregated.

Leaders of the Brigade Band included: Asa Fillebrown (1821–1826, 1828–1835); James Kendall (1826–1827); Abel F. Knight (1836–1844); J.H. Seipp (1844–1848); Patrick S. Gilmore (1852, c. 1859); and E.H. Weston (c. 1858).

Band members in 1824 included: John Bartlett (trumpet); James Clark (clarinet); Lemuel Clark (French horn); William Crombie (bassoon); Asa Fillebrown (clarinet); George W. Foster (octave flute); James K. Kendall (clarinet); Richard Madden (bugle); Joel R. Mann (clarinet); Moses Mann (serpent); Willard W. Mann (clarinet); J. Henry Niebuhr (trumpet); Calvin Simonds (clarinet); Jonathan Stanley (bass drum); Asa Warren (bass horn); John B. Warren; Samuel Wetherbee (French horn); Charles Wright (cymbals). "William Crombie, who beat the cymbols, kept a tavern on the corner of Cambridge and Garden" streets. "Lemuel Clark was a crusty man, but a good musician. He became drum major of the band in September, 1830(?), on Centennial day. ... He wore a scarlet coat, flat cocked hat and carried a red baton, which he never knew how to swing, saying: 'He wasn't going to play any of them monkey tricks.'"

The band often performed at appearances of the Boston Light Infantry. "The band uniform ... was especially neat and attractive and bore a marked difference to any then worn by the militia. The coat was blue, of the same style and pattern as worn by the officers of the U.S. army, with three rows of bell buttons on the front, and was further set off by a gold-laced collar."

According to one account, "the band grew in proficiency, and became quite celebrated. It existed until 1861, when it was dissolved by Mr. Eben Flagg. After the band dissolved, some of the musicians joined the Edmands' Band and Orchestra, formed in 1863 by Thomas Ormsby Edmands.

== Selected performances ==
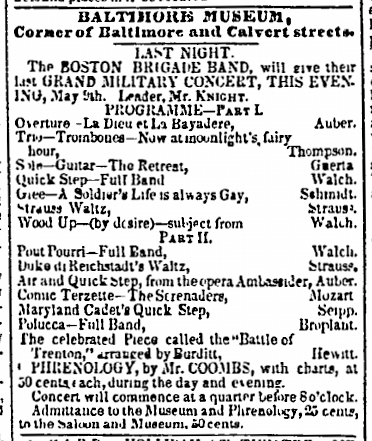
Newspaper announcement for the band's appearance in Baltimore, Maryland, 1840

- 1821 – September 23 – Brigade muster, Boston Common
- 1823 – October 15 – Salem Light Infantry 18th Anniversary, Salem MA
- 1825 – October 14: Salem East India Marine Society hall dedication.
- 1831 – June – Boston Guards visit to Philadelphia. "The band gave two concerts at Musical Fund Hall, which were greatly applauded, and attended by 12 or 1500 persons."
- 1830 – October 25 – Salem Light Infantry 25th Anniversary, Salem MA
- 1832 – Laying the cornerstone of the Masonic Temple, Boston.
- 1833 – October 16 – Salem Light Infantry 28th Anniversary, Salem MA
- 1835 – October 16 – Salem Light Infantry 30th Anniversary, Salem MA
- 1837
  - August 24 – Salem Light Infantry 32nd Anniversary, Salem MA
  - October 4 – Parade on Berry Street, Boston
- 1838 – October – Regimental parade, Boston
- 1840
  - May 29 – Parade in Ipswich, MA
  - July – Encampment of the Boston Light Infantry, Springfield Mass.
- 1841 – August 17 – Boston
- 1843 – February – Odeon, Boston
- 1844
  - May 30 – Abstinence Convention, Boston
  - June 26 – Salem, MA
  - August 15 – Yale commencement, New Haven CT
- 1853 – May 26 – Keene, New Hampshire, centennial celebration
- 1854 – August – University of Vermont semi-centennial celebration
- 1855
  - Middlesex Cattle Show and Exhibition. "The Spading Match took place at ten, immediately after the plowing, and, as usual, drew a large concourse of spectators. The stirring strains of the Boston Brigade Band lent their aid to the occasion, and the scene soon became an animated one, the spectators at once fixing upon their favorite competitors, and becoming as deeply interested as the spaders themselves."
  - October 9 – Salem Light Infantry 50th Anniversary, Salem MA
- 1856
  - Brown University commencement
  - October 2 – Reception of President Franklin Pierce in New Hampshire.
- 1859 – Visit of the Knights Templar of Boston to Masons in Richmond, California
- 1863 – September 2 – Arrival of the 54th Massachusetts Infantry at Commercial Wharf, Boston

== Sheet music ==
=== 1820s ===
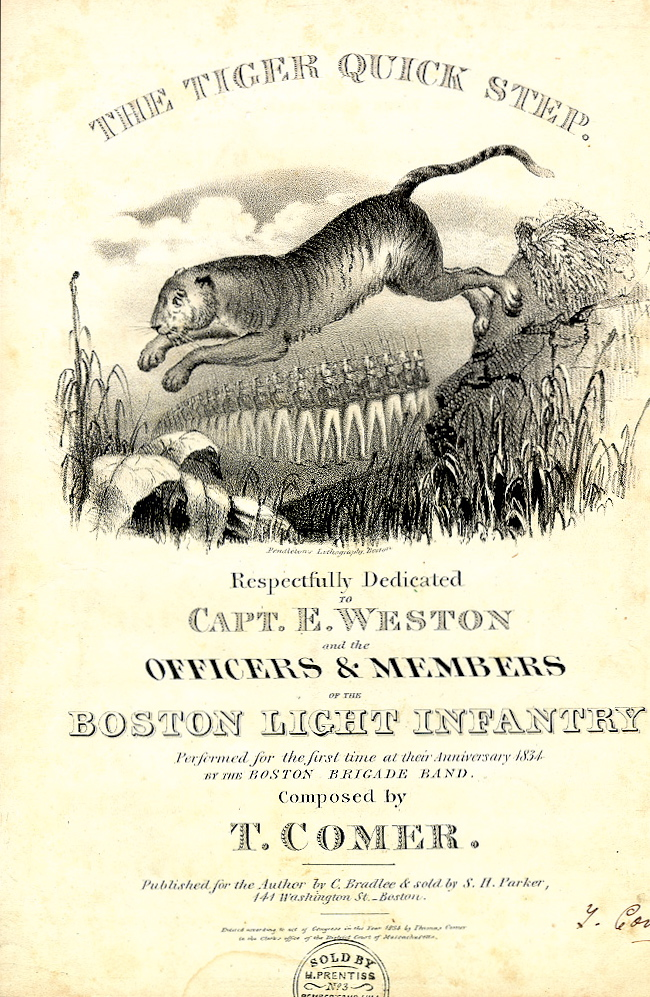
Tiger Quick Step, 1834

- The Boston Brigade march: as performed by the Brigade Band at the reception of Genl. Lafayette; arranged for the piano forte by James Hewitt. Boston: Published by James L. Hewitt at his music store no. 70 Market St., [1824?]. Also known as Lafayette's quick step.
- The Norfolk guards: favorite quickstep: as performed by the Boston Brigade band: arranged for the piano forte. New York: Published by James L. Hewitt & Co. at their music saloon, [between 1827 and 1829]

=== 1830s ===
- The Massachusetts Grand Railway march, as played by the Boston Brigade Band. Boston (197 Washington Street, Boston): John Ashton, [c. 1830]
- President Jackson's grand march, arranged for the piano forte by Mr. Peile. 2nd ed. New York: Published by J.L. Hewitt, [1830–1835]. "Performed by the Boston Brigade Band and presented by them to the publisher."
- Corner-stone march. Boston (164 Washington St.): Published by C. Bradlee, 1832. "As performed by the Boston Brigade Band at the ceremony of laying the cornerstone of the Masonic Temple, Boston. Dedicated to the fraternity by Ch. Zeuner."
- Rangers quick step. Boston: Published for the author by C. Bradlee; Boston (141 Washington St.): sold by S.H. Parker; Boston: Pendleton's Lithography, 1834. "Respectfully dedicated to Capt. C. R. Lowell and the officers and members of the Boston Rifle Rangers. Performed for the first time by the Boston Brigade Band, August 26, 1834. Composed (in part) by T. Comer."
- Rangers' trip to Westborough or lion quickstep. Boston: Published for the author by C. Bradlee; Pendleton's Lithogy, 1834. "Respectfully dedicated to Capt. Chas. C. Paine and the officers and members of the Rifle Rangers, Boston. Performed for the first time on their visit to the Lyon Farm by the Brigade Band at the opening of the railroad to Westborough, November 15th, 1834. Composed by James Hooton."
- The Tiger quick step, composed by Thos. Comer. Boston (115 Washington St., Boston): Oliver Ditson, 1834. "Respectfully dedicated to Capt. E. Weston and the Officers & members of the Boston Light Infantry, performed for the first time at their anniversary 1834 by the Boston Brigade Band."

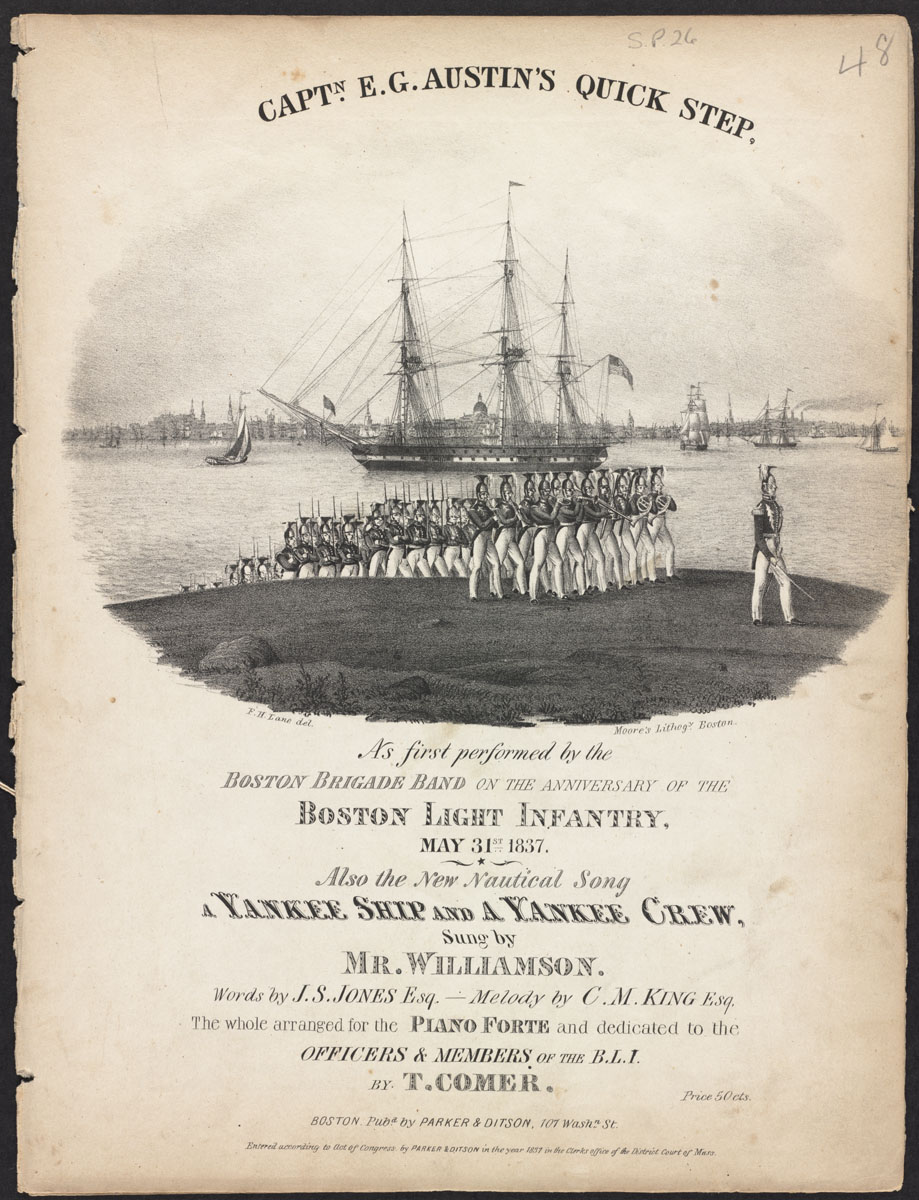
Austin's Quick Step, 1837

- City guards quickstep. Boston: Published by Oliver Ditson; Pendleton's Lithogy, 1835. "Composed by Walch, arranged for the pianoforte with a flute accompaniment and also for two flutes by Ch.Zeuner. Dedicated to the City Guards by the Boston Brigade Band."
- Paine's quick step: respectfully dedicated to Capt. Chas. C. Paine, as performed by the Boston Brigade Band at the encampment of the Rifle Rangers. Boston: Parker & Ditson, 1836.
- Pulaski quickstep. Boston: Published by Oliver Ditson; Boston: Moore's Lith., 1836. "As played by the Boston Brigade Band. Respectfully dedicated to Gen. J. L. C. Amee, first commander of the Pulaski Guards by James Hooton."
- Sutton's quick step: respectfully dedicated to Capt. William Sutton, and the officers and members of the Salem Independent Cadets by the Boston Brigade Band. Boston: Parker & Ditson, 1837.
- Charles Zeuner. Herz's quick step: as played by the Boston Brigade Band: arranged for the piano forte. Boston: Parker & Ditson, 1837.
- The Berry Street Rangers quickstep. Boston: Published by H.Prentiss; T. Moore's Lithogy, [c. 1837]. "Our Country is Safe" as performed by the Boston Brigade Band at the Volunteer Parade of the company Oct. 4th, 1837, and dedicated to the officers and members of the company by the Boston Brigade Band. Composed by Walch."
- The Dennis quickstep. Boston: Published by G. P. Reed; Thos. Moore's Lithography., 1839. "As performed by the Boston Brigade Band. Respectfully dedicated to Major Louis Dennis, officers, and members of the Hancock Light Infantry. Performed for the 1st time at their anniversary Oct.28th, 1839. Composed and arranged for the pianoforte and flute by B. A. Burditt."
- Greys quickstep. Boston: Published by Henry Prentiss; T. Moore's Lith., 1839. "Respectfully dedicated to Capt. John C. Park, officers, and members of the Greys. Composed and arranged for the piano by B. A. Burditt. Performed for the first time by the Boston Brigade Band at the encampment in Portsmouth, July 31st, 1839."
- Hancock Light Infantry quickstep. Boston: Published by Henry Prentiss; Thos.Moore's Lith., 1839. "Composed and dedicated to Capt. Louis Dennis, officers, and members of the Hancock Light Infantry by Wm. Isenbeck. As performed by the Boston Brigade Band on their first parade, Oct. 28th, 1839."
- Mammoth cod quickstep. Boston: Published by Henry Prentiss; Thos. Moore's Lith., 1839. "As performed by the Boston Brigade Band. Composed and respectfully dedicated to the members of the Mammoth Cod Association by B. A. Burditt. Arranged for the pianoforte by H. P. Monroe."
- Stevens quickstep. Boston: Published by Henry Prentiss; T. Moore's Lithogy., 1839. "Composed and respectfully dedicated to Captain Seriah Stevens, officers, and members of the Pulaski Guards by Zaleucus (a member of the company). As performed by the Boston Brigade Band at their encampment, Dorchester Heights, August 8th, 1839."

=== 1840s ===
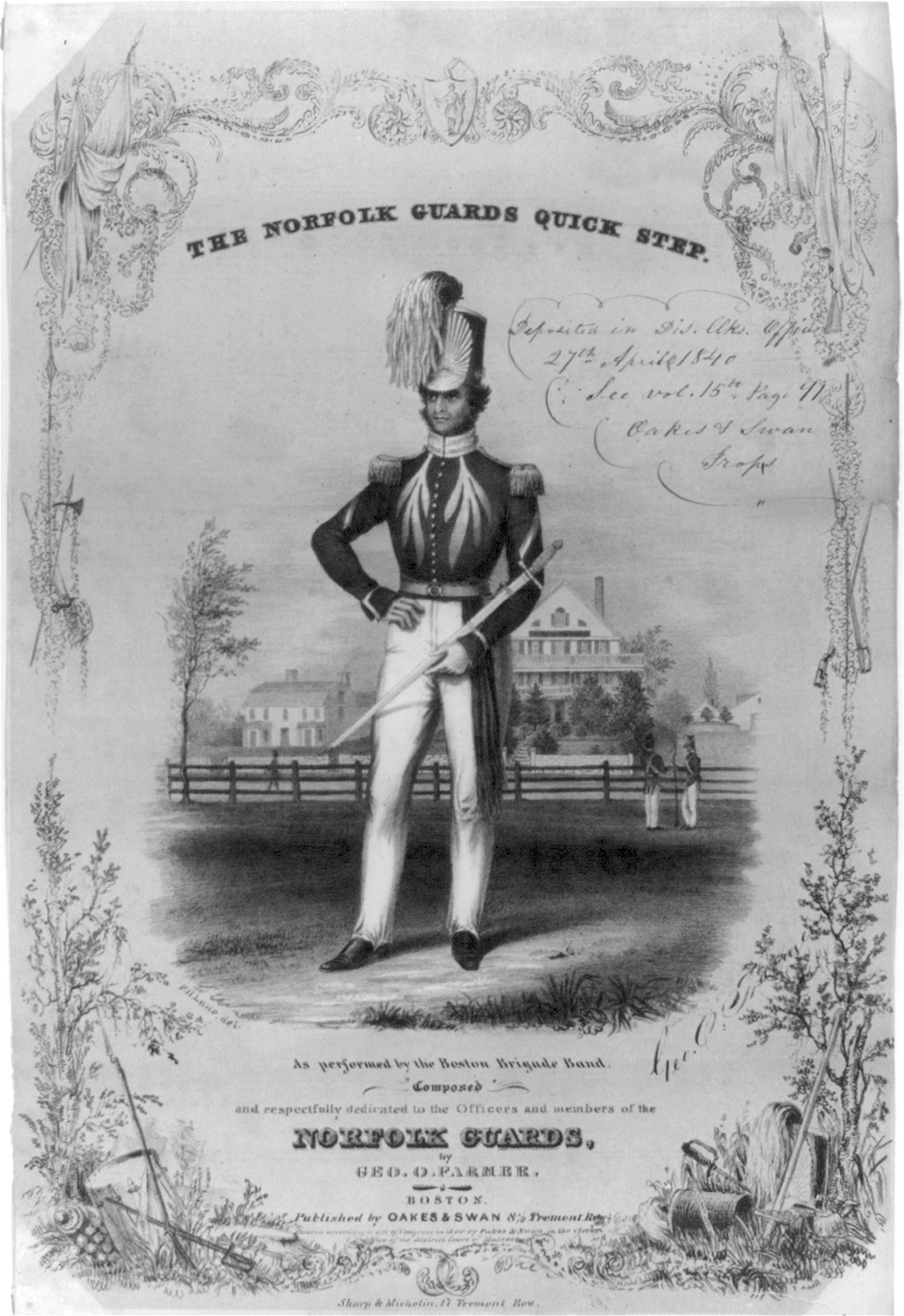
Norfolk Guards Quick Step, 1840

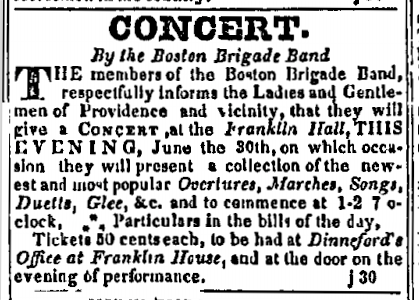
1830, Providence, Rhode Island

- Baltimore Whig Convention Quick Step. Boston: Published by Henry Prentiss; Thayer, successor to Moore, 1840. "As performed with great success by the Boston Brigade Band. Composed and arranged for the pianoforte by Zaleucus."
- Camp Sargent quick step. Boston: Published by Geo.P.Reed; Thayer's Lith., 1840. "Performed at the encampment of the Boston Light Infantry, Springfield Mass. July 1840. Inscribed by the Boston Brigade Band to Capt.E.G.Austin, officers, and members of that corps."
- Col. J.S.Amory's quick-step. Boston: Published for the author by H.Prentiss; Thayer, successor to Moore., c. 1840. "As performed by the Boston Brigade Band January 1st, 1840. Composed by B.A. Burditt for the Independent Company of Cadets & by them respectfully dedicated to their commander."
- Hall's quick step. Boston: Published by Oakes & Swan; Thayer's Lithogy., 1840. "As performed by the Boston Brigade Band. Composed and arranged by T.Bricher. Respectfully dedicated to Orderly John H.Hall by the Greys."
- The Norfolk Guards quick step. Boston: Published by Oakes & Swan, 1840. "As performed by the Boston Brigade Band. Composed and respectfully dedicated to the officers and members of the Norfolk Guards by George O.Farmer."
- The original castanet Spanish dance, la cachucha [sic]: as danced by Madlle. Fanny Elssler; performed with unbounded applause by the Boston Brigade Band. Boston: H. Prentiss, 1840.
- The Winnisimmet quickstep: As performed by the Boston Brigade Band. Boston: Published by Henry Prentiss; Thayer's Lithography, 1840.
- Worcester Guards quickstep. Boston: Published by Henry Prentiss; Thayer's Lith., 1840. "As performed by the Boston Brigade Band, September 19th, 1840. Composed and respectfully dedicated to the officers and members of the Worcester Guards by Samuel R. Leland."
- Funeral march. Boston: Published by Henry Prentiss; B.W.Thayer's Lithography, 1841. "In memory of William H. Harrison, late President of the United States. Performed by the Boston Brigade Band, April 10th, 1841. Composed and arranged for the pianoforte by J.H.Seipp."
- Mount Washington quick step. Boston: Published by Charles H. Keith; Thayer & Co's, 1842. "As performed by the Boston Brigade Band. Composed and arranged by Alexander Messinger, a pupil at the Massachusetts Asylum for the Blind. Respectfully dedicated to Dr.S.G.Howe, principal of that institution."
- Trull's quick step. Boston: Published by Parker & Ditson; Thayer & Co.'s Lith., 1842. "As performed by the Boston Brigade Band. Composed and respectfully dedicated to Lieut. Ezra Trull Jr. of the City Greys by T.Bricher."
- Twelve admired quick steps. Boston: Published by Chas. H. Keith; Thayer & Co.'s Lithogy., 1842. "To the memory of lost Poland composed and respectfully dedicated to the American nation by Adam Kurek, a Polish exile. As performed at the concerts of the celebrated Brigade Band of Boston, A. F. Knight, leader. Arranged for the pianoforte by Prof. J. R. Garcia of Boston."
- Capt. Andrews' quick step. Boston: Published by Henry Prentiss; Thayer & Co's Lith., c. 1843. "As performed by the Boston Brigade Band. Composed and arranged for the pianoforte and respectfully dedicated to Captain Samuel Andrews and the officers and members of the Boston Light Infantry by C.L. Holbrook."
- Winchester's quick step. Boston: Published by Chas.H.Keith; Thayer & Co's. Lithogy., 1843. "Respectfully dedicated by the officers and members of the Independent Company of Cadets to their commander Col. Wm. P. Winchester. Composed by Adam Kurek, introducing the Spanish air of El Abrazo de Vergara. Arranged for the piano by T.Comer. Performed by the Brigade Band at their concerts."
- Buonaparte quickstep. Boston: Published by Henry Prentiss; Thayer & Co.'s Lith., 1844. "As performed by the Boston Brigade Band. Composed and arranged for the pianoforte by Wm. C. Glynn."
- The celebrated Love not quick step, as performed by the Boston Brigade Band; arranged for the piano forte by J.H. Seipp. Boston (67 & 69 Court St., Boston): Keith's Music Publishing House, 1845.
- Duke de Reichstadt's Grand March. Boston (33 Court St.): Published by Henry Prentiss, [18--]. "As performed with great success by the Boston Brigade Band. Composed by Strauss."
