= Samuel Hale Parker =

American publisher (1781-1864)

Samuel Hale Parker (1781–1864) was a publisher and bookseller in 19th-century Boston, Massachusetts, United States. He published musical scores as well as novels, sermons, and other titles. He operated the Boston Circulating Library, and was among the founders of the Handel and Haydn Society.

== Biography ==
Samuel H. Parker was born in 1781 in Wolfeboro, New Hampshire to Matthew Stanley Gibson Parker and Ann Rust. His son James Cutler Dunn Parker (1828–1916) was a teacher and superintendent of examinations at the New England Conservatory of Music.

Parker worked as a bookbinder in Boston, 1802–1811. In 1811 Parker bought the Boston Book Store from William Blagrove. The store sold books, as one might expect, including "several hundred books of vocal and instrumental music, and some sheet music for the piano, ... pianos and other musical wares, mending glues, concert and theater tickets, new sheet music, and works of fiction." Around 1809–1816 he and booksellers Edmund Munroe and David Francis ran a joint publishing firm: Munroe, Francis and Parker. Parker also published titles under his own imprint, utilizing Munroe & Francis as printers.

In 1815 Parker and others founded Boston's Handel and Haydn Society.

In addition to publishing, he ran a library with both circulating and non-circulating collections. As of 1815, "Parker's reading-room is opened from 9 in the morning till 9 at night, and contains all the Boston papers, some of the principal Southern papers and magazines, English reviews, &c. A large collection of music, and some beautiful drawings, are kept for loan: to be increased every opportunity." By 1818 Parker's circulating collection, known as the Boston Union Circulating Library or the Boston Circulating Library held some 7,000 volumes, the largest of its kind in town. As proprietor of the bookshop and library, Parker benefitted from the efforts of his forebears who had built the enterprise over decades—William Martin, Benjamin Guild, William P. Blake, William Pelham, William Blagrove.

Through the years Parker conducted his business activities from several successive addresses in Boston: 3 School Street (1811); 4 Cornhill (1815); 1 Water Street (ca.1817); 12 Cornhill (1818); 164 Washington Street (1825–1832); 10 School Street, 141 Washington Street, then 107 Washington Street (all in 1834); 135 Washington Street (1838). A fire in 1833 caused his move to new premises on School Street.

Oliver Ditson and Parker established the publishing firm of Parker and Ditson in 1836. The partnership ended in 1842, when Ditson bought Parker's interest in the firm.

He belonged to the Trinity Church congregation, where his relative Samuel Parker ministered. He also sang in the Trinity Church choir.

== Images ==
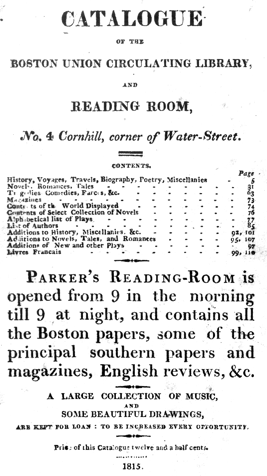
Library catalog, 1815

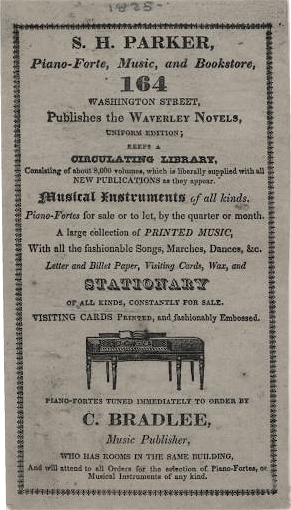
Advertisement, 1825

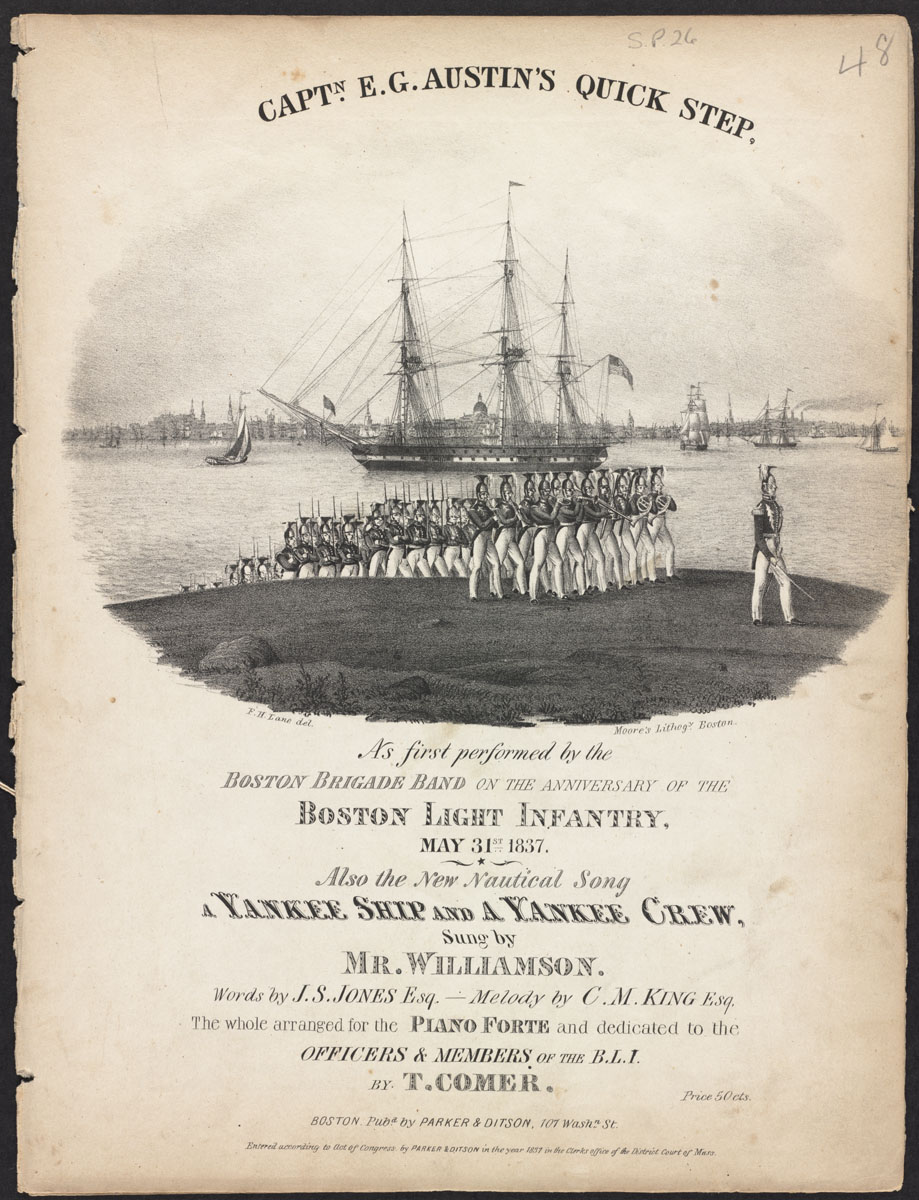
Parker & Ditson publication, 1837

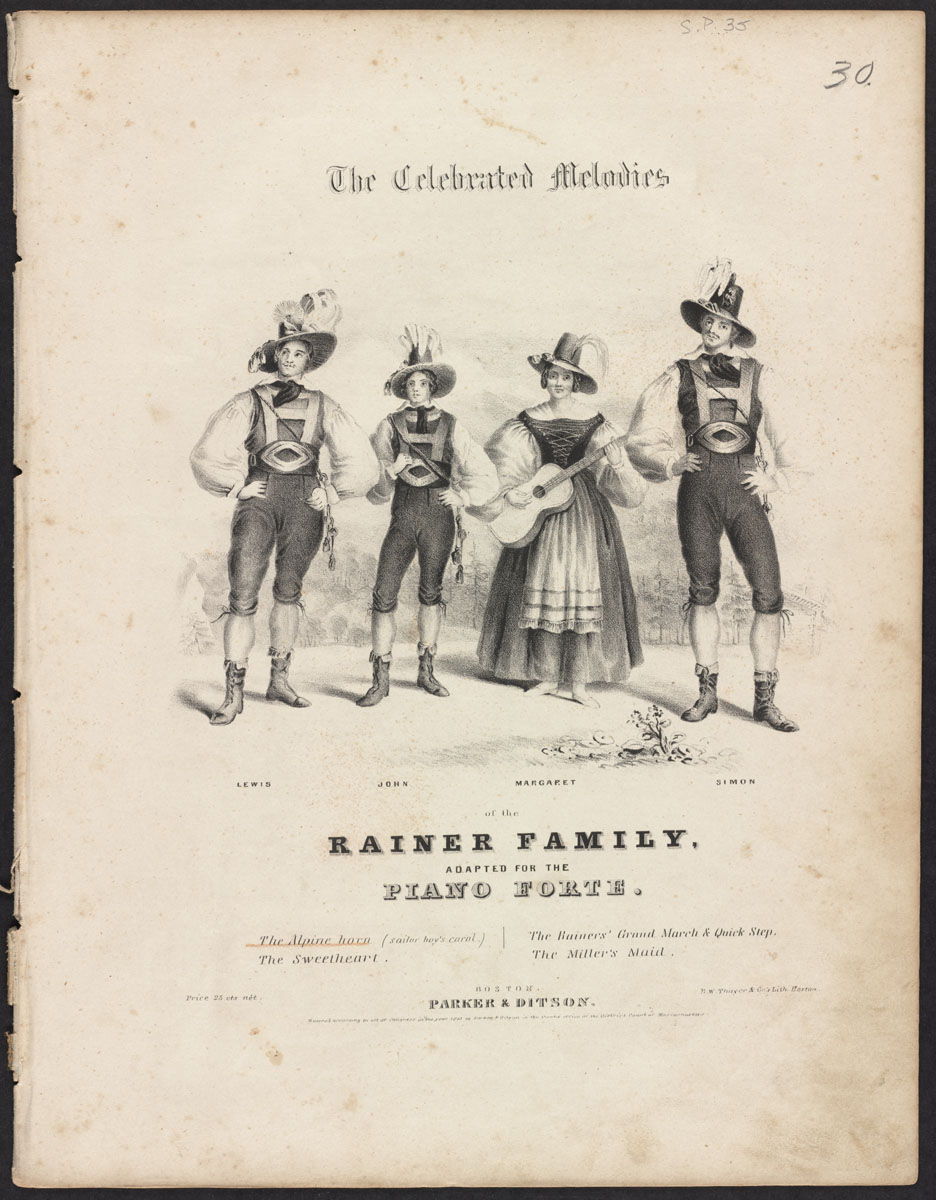
Parker & Ditson publication, 1841

== Selected titles published by Parker ==
=== Munroe, Francis & Parker ===
Works

- Madame Cottin. Elizabeth, or, The exiles of Siberia: a tale, founded upon facts. 1809.
- Ezra Sargeant. Universal biography. 1809.

Catalogs

- Catalogue of the Boston Union Circulating Library, and Reading Room. 1815.

=== S.H. Parker ===
Textual works

- Edward Bickersteth. A Scripture help: designed to assist in reading the Bible profitably. Boston. 1817.
- Walter Scott. The antiquary: A romance. 1821.
- Walter Scott. Tales of my landlord. Second series. 1821.
- Walter Scott. The monastery: A romance. 1822.
- Walter Scott. Rob Roy: A romance. 1822.
- John Leycester Adolphus. Letters to Richard Heber, Esq.: containing critical remarks on the series of novels beginning with "Waverley," and an attempt to ascertain their author. 1822.
- Mary Grafton. Spiritual gleanings; or, Select essays with Scripture mottos. 1824.
- Elizabeth Hamilton. Letters on the elementary principles of education. 1825.
- Analysis of the game of chess. 1826.
- Philander Chase. A plea for the West. 1827.
- George Washington Doane. The missionary argument: a sermon preached by appointment, before the Board of Directors of the Domestic and Foreign Missionary Society of the Protestant Episcopal Church, in the U.S. of America, in St. Andrews Church, Philadelphia; on Tuesday evening, May 11, 1830. 1830.
- George Washington Doane. The voice of the departed: a sermon preached in Trinity Church, Boston, on Sunday, September 12, 1830; on occasion of the death of the late Rector, the Reverend John Sylvester John Gardiner, D.D. 1830.
- John Henry Hopkins. Religion the only safeguard of national prosperity: A sermon preached in Trinity Church, Boston, December 1, 1831; Being the day of annual thanksgiving. 1831.
- Manton Eastburn. The voice of God in the recent national bereavement a sermon delivered in Trinity Church, Boston, on the morning of Sunday, October 31, 1852, being the Sunday after the interment of the Hon. Daniel Webster. 1852.
- Waverly Novels. 1853.

Musical scores

- Joseph Mazzinghi. Ye shepherds tell me. 1816.
- Henry R Bishop. Tho' 'tis all but a dream a French air. 1824.

Catalogs

- Catalogue of the Boston Union Circulating Library, no. 3. 1812.
- Catalogue of the Boston Union Circulating Library, no. 12. 1820.

=== Parker & Ditson ===
- John Barnett. A harper sat by a tranquil stream: from Lays of Woodstock, an old English legend of romance. 1835.
- George Kingsley; Thomas Moore. The time worn lute. 1836.
- William Smith. Free Bridge quick step and waltz: composed and arranged for the piano forte. 1836.
- Simon Knaebel. Quick step from Robert le diable. 1836.
- Charles Zeuner. Congress waltz: composed for the piano forte. 1836.
- A F Knight. Paine's quick step: respectfully dedicated to Capt. Chas. C. Paine, as performed by the Boston Brigade Band at the encampment of the Rifle Rangers. 1836.
- Bartholomew Brown. The archers' song: as sung at the anniversary of the Robin-Hood Archers, October 1, 1836.
- T Comer. Ode: sung at the second centennial celebration of Harvard University, Cambridge, on the 8th of September 1836.
- Simon Knaebel. Jackson's grand march: as played at the Boston Democratic Celebration July 4, 1836 by the Boston Brass Band and then respectfully dedicated with permission to Gen. Andrew Jackson, President of the United States. 1836.
- A F Knight. Sutton's quick step : respectfully dedicated to Capt. William Sutton, and the officers and members of the Salem Independent Cadets by the Boston Brigade Band. 1837.
- Here's a health to all good lasses. 1837.
- Charles Zeuner. Herz's quick step: as played by the Boston Brigade Band : arranged for the piano forte. 1837.
- Charles Zeuner. Overture to the opera of La Norma. 1837.
- Henry Russell. My heart's in the highlands: a favourite song sung at the principal concerts by Mr. H. Russell. 1837.
- E B Bohuszewicz. Boston grand march: for the pianoforte. 1837.
- Geo O Farmer. The dying mariner's request. 1837.
- A U Hayter; Maria Caterina Rosalbina Caradori-Allan. The Piper O'Dundee: Jacobite relic. 1838.
- David Claypoole Johnson. The Schoolmaster : a very popular glee. 1838.
- George Frideric Handel. Recitative, Deeper and deeper still; Aria, Waft her, Angels, through the skies : as sung by Mr. Braham. ca.1838–1842.
- Joseph Philip Knight; Jonas B Phillips. The gipsy's invitation: a cavatina. 1840.
- William Hayden. The National Whig song. 1840.
- George Hews. The Whig waltz. 1840.
- Joseph Haydn. Piercing eyes. ca.1840.
- Grand march by the Rainer Family, arranged for the piano forte. 1841.
- Ralph Loomis. The song my mother used to sing: a ballad. 1841.

== Selected writings by Parker ==
- Review of the life and fragments of Miss Elizabeth Smith. Boston: Samuel H. Parker, 1810.

== See also ==
- List of booksellers in Boston
