= Pat and Ernie =

Canadian children's music television series

- Genre: Children's television
- Starring: Patrick Trudell; Ernie Prentice
- Country of origin: Canada
- Original language: English
- No. of seasons: 1

Production
- Production location: Vancouver
- Running time: 30 minutes

Original release
- Network: CBC Television
- Release: 6 October – 29 December 1961

Pat and Ernie is a Canadian children's music television program that aired on CBC Television in 1961.

== Premise ==
This Vancouver-produced program featured classical music for children, hosted by Patrick Trudell (piano) and Ernie Prentice (vocals). Prentice was previously seen on CBC's A Hatful of Music (1960). Series regulars included Gavin Hussey (double bass) and Mickey McMartin (drums), who were accompanied by various visiting musicians.

== Scheduling ==
This half-hour program was broadcast on Fridays at 3:00 p.m. (Eastern) from 6 October to 29 December 1961.
