= Odeon, Boston =

Coordinates: 42°21′19.97″N 71°3′23.48″W

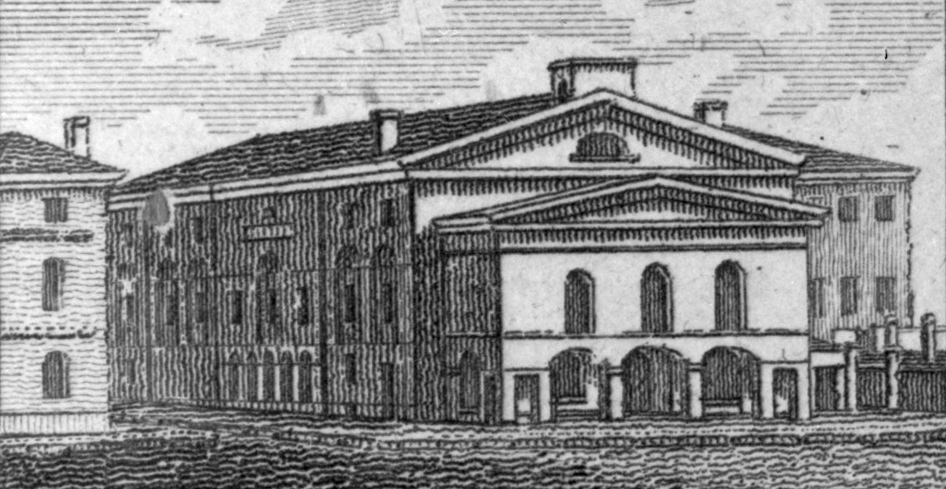
Odeon, Boston, 19th century

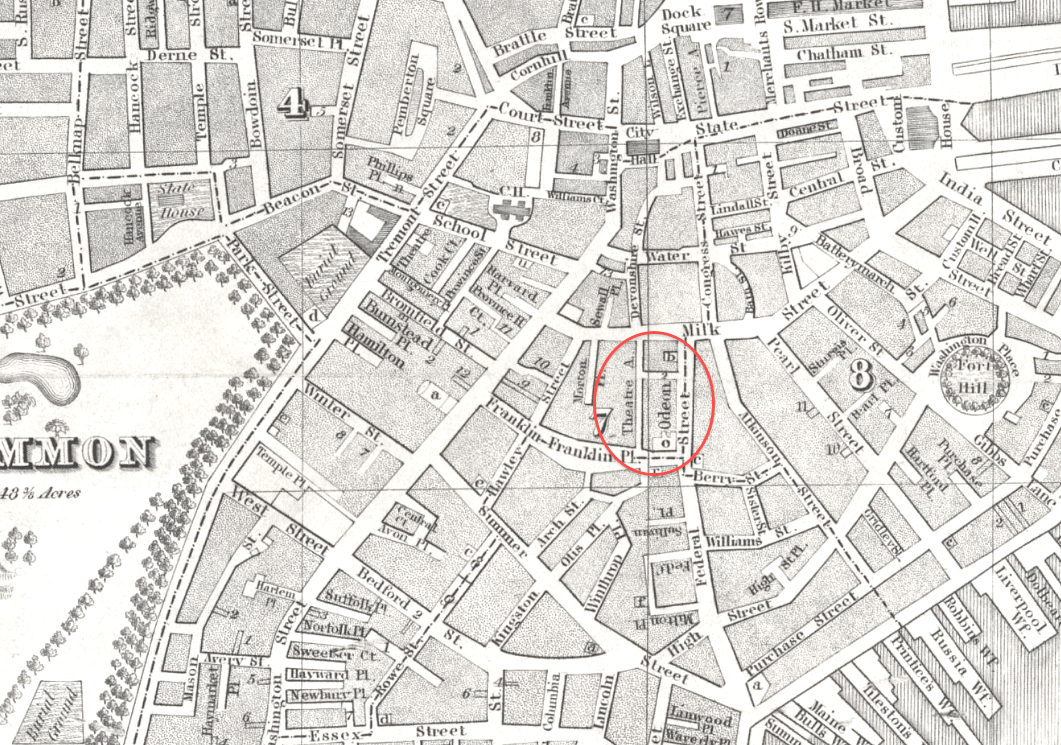
Detail of 1838 map of Boston, showing Odeon on Federal St.

The Odeon (1835 – c. 1846) of Boston, Massachusetts, was a lecture and concert hall on Federal Street in the building also known as the Boston Theatre. The 1,300-seat auditorium measured "50 feet square" with "red moreen"-upholstered "seats arranged in a circular order, and above them ... spacious galleries." The Boston Academy of Music occupied the Odeon in the 1830s and 1840s Notable events at the Odeon included "the first performance in Boston of a Beethoven symphony."

== Events ==
=== 1830s ===
- Samuel A. Elliot opening address
- Joseph Story "on the life and professional character of the late Chief Justice Marshall"
- William Apess lecture
- James Madison memorial
- William Ellery Channing lecture
- Charles Zeuner concert
- Edward Everett lecture
- A.E. Grimké lecture
- Samuel J. May lecture
- Ralph Waldo Emerson lecture
- Society for the Prevention of Pauperism meeting

=== 1840s ===
- Musical Convention
- Boston Children's Friend Society fundraiser
- Massachusetts Temperance Union meeting
- Boston Brigade Band concert
- George Lunt presentation
- Edgar Allan Poe reading
