= Suzanne Grossmann =

American dramatist and actress

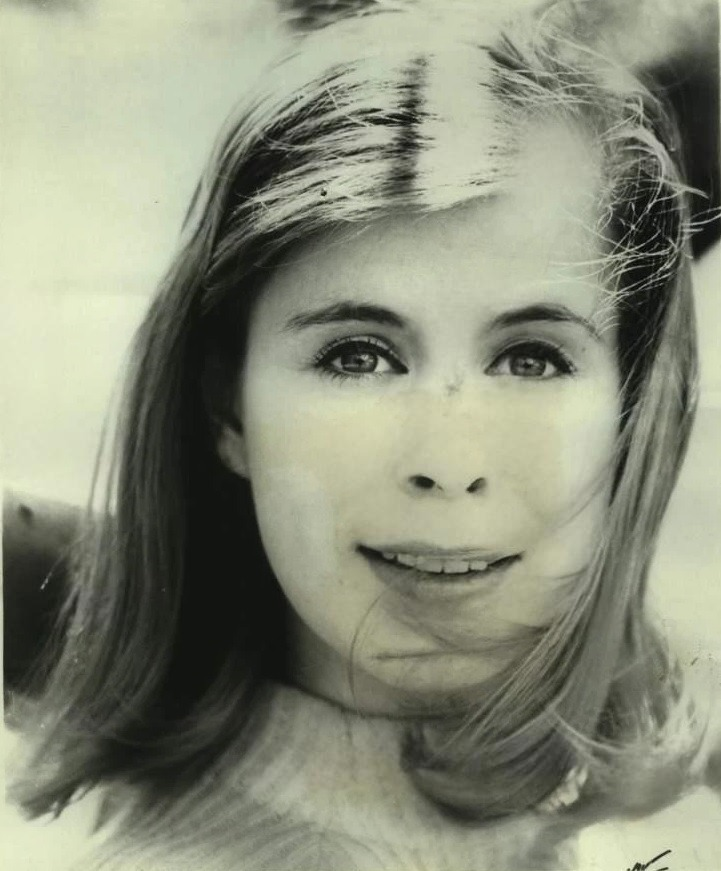
- Grossmann in 1967
- Born: Marie Carolyn Suzanne Grossmann; December 21, 1937; Basel, Switzerland
- Died: August 19, 2010 (aged 72); Los Angeles, California, US
- Other name: Suzanne Grossman
- Education: McGill University, Montreal; National Theatre School of Canada
- Occupations: Actress; Playwright; Screenwriter; Translator
- Years active: 1961–
- Spouse: Robert Ray Scales (1997–2010)

Suzanne Grossmann (December 21, 1937 – August 19, 2010) was a Swiss-American actress, playwright and television writer, born in Basel, Switzerland.

== Early life and education ==
Grossmann lived and studied in Brazil, Canada, and the USA. Having first obtained her Bachelor of Arts degree at McGill University, Montreal, Quebec, Grossmann was among the first graduates of the National Theatre School of Canada in 1963.

== Career ==
Stage

Grossmann made her Broadway debut in James Goldman's The Lion in Winter, playing Alais. In 1968 she was Roxane to Robert Symonds' Cyrano in a revival of Cyrano de Bergerac. A revival of George Kelly's The Show-Off, starring Helen Hayes, followed later that year, and, in 1970, she played Sybil Chase in Private Lives opposite the Elyot and Amanda of Brian Bedford and Tammy Grimes.

With Paxton Whitehead, a fellow actor, she translated and adapted Georges Feydeau's farce There's One in Every Marriage for the Broadway stage in 1971, followed by Feydeau's Chemin de Fer. Other works she adapted include Alpha and Omega, La Vie Parisienne, Number Our Days, and A Flea in Her Ear. Her works were staged by theater companies such as Chelsea Theater Center in Manhattan, NYC, Old Globe Theatre in San Diego, and the Mark Taper Forum in Los Angeles.

Screen

Soon after, Grossmann turned her talents to writing for television, including Canadian Broadcasting Corporation teleplays for "Showstopper", "Nellie", and the Great Performances episode "Sarah" (1976). She wrote more than 100 episodes for the popular, long-running television soap opera Ryan's Hope.

On television, Grossmann had acting roles on the CBC anthology series Festival (1963–1964), and as Miep Gies in the ABC production of The Diary of Anne Frank (1967), and as Cleopatra in the three-part documentary series, Shaw vs. Shakespeare.

== Personal life and death ==
Grossmann was married to Robert Scales, who was a dean of the theater school at University of Southern California. Grossmann died on August 19, 2010 (aged 72) of chronic obstructed pulmonary disorder

== Filmography ==
Suzanne Grossmann film and television acting credits
Year	Title	Role	Notes	Ref.
1963	Festival	Antigone	Episode: "Antigone" (S4.E2)	
1964	Festival	Jenny Hill	Episode: "Major Barbara" (S4.E14)	
1964	Festival	Brovic	Episode: "The Master Builder" (S5.E5)	
1967	Il ne faut pas mourir pour ça	Mary	Theatrical Film. English: Don't Let It Kill You	
1967	The Diary of Anne Frank	Miep Gies	Television film	
1970	Shaw vs. Shakespeare	Cleopatra	Documentary shorts: "I. The Character of Caesar" & "III: Caesar and Cleopatra"	
