= James Cutler Dunn Parker =

American composer (1828–1916)

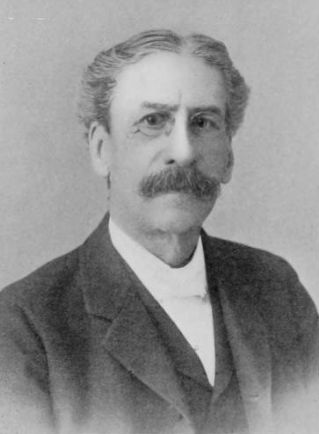
- Born: June 2, 1828; Boston, Massachusetts, US
- Died: November 27, 1916 (aged 88); Brookline, Massachusetts, US
- Occupations: Musician, educator
- Father: Samuel Hale Parker

James Cutler Dunn Parker (June 2, 1828 – November 27, 1916) was an American organist, educator and composer.

== Biography ==
James Cutler Dunn Parker was born in Boston on June 2, 1828, the son of Samuel Hale Parker. He graduated from Harvard in 1848. After graduating from Harvard Law School, Parker went to the Leipzig Conservatory in 1851, where he studied piano with Ignaz Moscheles and Louis Plaidy, composition with Julius Rietz and Ernst Richter, and music theory and harmony with Moritz Hauptmann.

He returned to Boston in 1854, and began offering private lessons, as he did throughout his life. In 1862, several of his private students formed the Parker Club, which offered concerts of instrumental and choral music. He married Maria Derby of Andover in 1859. They had one child. From 1864 to 1891, he served as organist at the Trinity Church, Boston, his career there coinciding almost completely with that of minister Phillips Brooks. J.C.D. Parker's grandfather Samuel Parker had been rector at Trinity.

Parker also played the organ for the concerts of the Handel and Haydn Society. He taught at the New England Conservatory from 1871 to 1897; Alfred Dudley Turner was one of his students. After 1897 he worked as an examiner at the Conservatory.

Parker composed hymns, cantatas, oratorios, church music, and works for piano. In addition, he wrote two sets of pedagogical pieces. He wrote works on harmony in 1855 and 1870, and translated Richter's Harmonielehre (Manual of Harmony) into English in 1873.

He died in Brookline, Massachusetts on November 27, 1916.
