= Sheila Henig =

Canadian pianist and soprano (1934–1979)

- Born: February 19, 1934; Winnipeg, Manitoba, Canada
- Died: May 15, 1979 (aged 45); Toronto, Ontario, Canada
- Occupations: Pianist; Soprano
- Spouse: William Sidney
- Children: 2

Sheila Henig (February 19, 1934 – May 15, 1979) was a Canadian pianist and soprano. She performed as a soloist with the Halifax, Toronto and CBC Symphony Orchestras as well as the Houston Symphony Orchestra. Henig toured Canada as well as some European nations. She also appeared in concerts broadcast on radio and television by the CBC and was a panelist on the CBC Radio program Music and Opinion in 1973. A posthumous biography on Henig authored by her father and the freelance writer Madeline Thompson was published in 1982.

== Biography ==
On February 19, 1934, Henig was born in Winnipeg. She was the daughter of Harry Henig and his wife. Henig was able to sing and dance by the age of two, performing in English and doing aerobics, tap dance and toe dance at a high level. In April 1938, she ventured to Los Angeles for an extended visit so she could audition. There, Eddie Cantor recommended Henig not be pushed but be allowed to develop further before making public presentations. She took on his advice and attended dancing and vocal lessons and made occasional appearances in Winnipeg. By the age of 11, Henig had decided she wanted to become either a grand opera singer or a pianist. She won the Rose Bowl at Toronto's Kiwanis Music Festival, but subsequently opted to be a pianist when she was aged 18 because her voice was not sufficiently developed enough.

Under Jean Broadfoot and Gordon Kushner in Winnipeg and under Margaret Miller Brown at The Royal Conservatory of Music, Henig studied piano. She studied voice with Dorothy Allan Park and Lillian Smith Weichel. Henig earned the $1,000 Eaton Graduating Scholarship in Music for being the "student graduating with the highest standing from the Royal Conservatory of Music" in 1955. She performed as a soloist with the Halifax, Toronto and CBC Symphony Orchestras as well as the Houston Symphony Orchestra. Henig qualified for the finals of each of the 1956 and 1957 Naumberg competitions. In 1957, she made her debut in New York, performing Wolfgang Amadeus Mozart's Sonata in A minor at Steinway Concert Hall on December 21. Henig went on to be the guest artist with the Victoria Symphony Orchestra during her British Columbia Coast debut in Sidney, British Columbia on November 6, 1959. She also became nationally known by appearing in concerts broadcast on radio and television by the CBC and was a panelist on the CBC Radio program Music and Opinion during 1973.

In 1961, Henig went to Europe on a short visit, partaking in the International Competition for Musical Performers in Geneva and winning the Laureate there. She made her European debut in the Concertgebouw in Amsterdam in the same year. After Canada heard of the news of her European debut, Henig undertook a number of engagements. In 1964, she undertook a more extensive tour of Europe, vising Austria, Greece and Spain and ended her tour at Wigmore Hall in London. Henig also recorded extensively for the BBC. Seven years later, Henig did a concert at the National Gallery of Art in Washington, D.C. She was praised by the critic Paul Hume as "... impressive ... superb ... brilliant." Approaching the mid-1970s, Henig made fewer public appearances because she wanted to spend more time with her husband and two children.

She was featured on the album Piano Portraits released by Attic Records in 1975. Henig undertook a second tour of Europe lasting three weeks in the following year. She also performed at the Stratford Festival and at the Charlottetown Festival. In early 1978, Henig made her recital debut in New York at Carnegie Hall, performing as a chamber musician, singer and soloist as an accompanist for the Soviet oboist Senia Trubashnik.

== Personal life ==
Henig was married to the pharmacist William Sidney. They had two children. On 15 May 1979, she was found dead at the wheel of her car in the garage of her home in Toronto. The cause of death was ruled as suicide.

== Approach and legacy ==
She consistently spent five to six hours a day practising. Henig only played classical music and did not perform 12-tone works since she did not have much sympathy for that type of music. In 1982, a biography on Henig entitled Elusive Summit: The Biography Of Sheila Henig authored by the freelance writer Madeline Thompson and Henig's father was published.
