= Robert Aitken (composer) =

Canadian composer and flautist (born 1939)

Robert Aitken OC
- Born: Robert Morris Aitken; August 28, 1939 (age 86); Kentville, Nova Scotia, Canada
- Genres: Orchestral
- Occupations: composer and flautist
- Instrument: Flute

Robert Morris Aitken CM (born August 28, 1939) is a Canadian composer and flautist. He began his career as a teenager playing in a number of orchestras, notably becoming the youngest principal flautist in the history of the Vancouver Symphony Orchestra in 1958 at the age of 19. In 1971, he abandoned ensemble performance to pursue a highly successful solo career. He has appeared as a soloist with major symphony orchestras throughout North America, Europe and Asia and has made more than 40 commercial recordings.

Born in Kentville, Nova Scotia, Aitken has played with the Vancouver Symphony Orchestra, CBC Symphony Orchestra, and Toronto Symphony Orchestra. He is Co-Artistic Director of New Music Concerts in Toronto. He has also done classical and contemporary music (along with eminent harpist Erica Goodman) on BIS Records. He studied flute with Nicolas Fiore, Marcel Moyse, Jean-Pierre Rampal, Andre Jaunet, Severino Gazzelloni, and Hubert Barwahser.

From 1988 to 2004, Aitken was a member of the music faculty at the Staatliche Hochschule für Musik in Freiburg, Germany. He is also a former faculty member of the University of Toronto (1960–1975) and the Shawnigan Summer School of Arts (1972–1982) and was director of advanced studies in music at the Banff Centre from 1985 to 1989.

== Selected compositions ==
Scores are available through the Canadian Music Centre.

Orchestral

- Spectra for four chamber groups (1968)
- Shadows I: Nekuia (1971)
- Spiral (1975)

Concertante

- Concerto for 12 solo instruments (2 flutes, 2 oboes, 2 clarinets, bassoon, horn, violin, viola, cello, double bass) and orchestra (1965)
- Berceuse "for Those Who Sleep before Us" for flute and orchestra (1992)
- Concerto (Shadows V) for flute and string orchestra (1999)

Chamber music

- Kebyar for flute, clarinet, trombone, 2 double basses, percussion and prepared tape (1971)
- Shadows II: Lalitá for flute, 3 cellos, 2 harps and 2 percussion (1973)
- Icicle for flute solo (1977); Éditions musicales transatlantiques
- Plainsong for flute solo (1977); Universal Edition
- Folia for woodwind quintet (1980)
- My Song: Shadows IV for 2 flutes (1994)
- A Little Ground for Max for violin, trumpet, bass clarinet, double bass, percussion and piano (1997)
- Wedding Song for 2 flutes (1998)

Choral

- Monodie: Fragments for mixed chorus and flute (1983)

== Honours ==
- 1993 – Aitken was made a Member of the Order of Canada.
- 2003 – National Flute Association Lifetime Achievement Award

== See also ==
- Flute
- Flute concerto
- Flute repertory
