= Hamlet at Elsinore =

1964 television film

- Genre: Drama
- Based on: Hamlet
- Written by: William Shakespeare
- Directed by: Philip Saville
- Starring: Christopher Plummer; Robert Shaw; Alec Clunes; Michael Caine; June Tobin; Jo Maxwell Muller
- Music by: Richard Rodney Bennett
- Original language: English

Production
- Producer: Peter Luke
- Production locations: Helsingør, North Zealand, Denmark
- Running time: 170 minutes
- Production companies: BBC TV; Danmarks Radio

Original release
- Network: CBC Television
- Release: 15 April 1964
- Network: BBC TV
- Release: 19 April 1964

Related
- Festival (Canadian season 4)

Hamlet at Elsinore is a 1964 television adaptation of William Shakespeare's play, Hamlet (ca. 1600) directed by Philip Saville, and produced by BBC TV in association with Danmarks Radio. Canadian actor Christopher Plummer took the lead role as Hamlet, having played the role previously with the Stratford Festival. Plummer earned an Emmy Award nomination for his performance.

Also starring are British actors Robert Shaw as Claudius, theatrical manager Alec Clunes as Polonius, June Tobin as Gertrude, London-born stage/screen actress Jo Maxwell-Muller as Ophelia, and, in his only Shakespearean performance, Michael Caine as Horatio. In supporting roles are character actor and comedian Roy Kinnear as the Gravedigger, actor/playwright Steven Berkoff as Lucianus and Canadian actor Donald Sutherland as Fortinbras. The music was composed by English pianist Richard Rodney Bennett.

Hamlet at Elsinore was acclaimed, both for its performances and, for being shot entirely at Helsingør in the castle in which the play is set. It is the only version of the play to have been shot at Elsinore Castle that included sound. It was the longest version of the play telecast in one evening up to that time, running nearly three hours. A 1947 telecast of the play had split it up into two ninety-minute halves over two weeks.

== Cast ==
- Christopher Plummer as Hamlet
- Robert Shaw as Claudius, King of Denmark
- Alec Clunes as Polonius
- Michael Caine as Horatio
- June Tobin as Gertrude, Queen of Denmark
- Jo Maxwell-Muller as Ophelia
- Roy Kinnear as the Gravedigger
- Philip Locke as Osric
- Dyson Lovell as Laertes
- Peter Prowse as Marcellus
- David Calderisi as Rosencrantz
- Bill Wallis as Guildenstern
- Charles Carson as Priest
- David Swift as Player King
- Lindsay Kemp as Player Queen
- Steven Berkoff as Lucianus
- Donald Sutherland as Fortinbras
- Joby Blanshard as Captain
- Michael Goldie as Bernado
- William Hobbs as Prologue/fight arranger

== Production ==
From conception to execution, the production took eight weeks and four days.

It was originated by Danish television, which lacked the financial resources to realize the project and turned to the BBC for help. Videotaped at Kronborg Castle in Elsinore, Denmark, in September 1963 by a Danish crew with the director and actors supplied by the BBC, it represents a technical milestone for the BBC as a full-length play had never been videotaped on-location before.

The producer, Peter Luke, deliberately cast lesser-known actors as it was felt using major stars would prove a distraction. Christopher Plummer had an established career in the theatre at the Stratford Shakespeare Festival, Ontario, where he had first played Hamlet seven years earlier. However, Christopher Plummer's movie stardom wouldn't be cemented until The Sound of Music (1965). Robert Shaw was at the start of his international film career, having recently finished filming From Russia with Love (1963) at the time of production. Michael Caine had his first important film role in Zulu (1964), released several months after filming. Donald Sutherland wouldn't become a star until 1970 after the release of the film MASH. Jo Maxwell-Muller, who was only 20 years old, was cast as Ophelia on the insistence of Plummer.

This programme was recorded and edited on video tape (2" quadruplex).

== Reception ==
=== Awards ===
At the 18th Emmy Awards (1966), Christopher Plummer was nominated in the category of Outstanding Single Performance by an Actor in a Leading Role in a Drama for his performance as Hamlet.

=== Cast and crew ===
After two weeks of rehearal and filming, Christopher Plummer, commented about the production, "I never want to do another television show in a studio. I would like all drama to be like this. It has the documentary feeling about it – it's happening now."

Steven Berkoff writes about his time as a junior cast member in his autobiography Free Association. Horatio is the only classical role played by Michael Caine, who had never received dramatic training. According to his 2011 autobiography The Elephant to Hollywood, Caine had been released from his contract with producer Joseph E. Levine after the making of Zulu as Levine had told him, "I know you're not, but you gotta face the fact that you look like a queer on screen."

Caine wrote, "I decided that if my on-screen appearance was going to be an issue, then I would use it to bring out all Horatio's ambiguous sexuality."

== Releases ==
=== Broadcast ===
Hamlet at Elsinore debuted in Canada, broadcast on CBC Television as a special episode of the anthology series Festival on 15 April 1964.

It was broadcast in the United Kingdom by BBC TV on 19 April 1964, shortly before Shakespeare's 400th birthday, traditionally observed on Saint George's Day, the 23rd of April, despite his baptism on the 26th. Hamlet at Elsinore was intended by the BBC to be its major commemoration of the Shakespeare quatercentenary.

Broadcasting in the United States was delayed, in part, because evening network time would cost in excess of $300,000 in addition to the cost for acquiring broadcast rights from the BBC. However, it was screened at the Johnny Victory Theater (west 49th st.) by invitation to critics and select guests as late as early May 1964 by the New York City office of the BBC. It was broadcast in the United States on November 15, 1964. Afterwards, it was occasionally re-aired by National Educational Television.

Clips of the programme are very rarely shown on television. Plummer himself expressed a wish for it to be commercially available.

The full play was shown in the UK on BBC Four on 5 November 2023, along with a 15 minute programme with Steven Berkoff relating his experiences working on the production.

=== Home releases ===
It was released on Region 1 DVD by the BBC and Warner on 25 October 2011. The restored video was first shown in the U.S. at the 2011 Sarasota Film Festival. The DVD contains a 90-minute feature with Christopher Plummer, recorded at the festival.

== See also ==
- Hamlet on screen

== Sources ==
- Schoenbaum, S. (1987). William Shakespeare: A Compact Documentary Life (Revised ed.). Oxford: Oxford University Press. ISBN 978-0-19-505161-2.
