= The Diary of Anne Frank (1967 film) =

1967 TV film directed by Alex Segal

- Based on: The Diary of a Young Girl by Anne Frank; The Diary of Anne Frank by Albert Hackett
- Written by: James Lee
- Screenplay by: Alex Segal
- Directed by: Alex Segal
- Starring: Max von Sydow; Diana Davila; Peter Beiger; Theodore Bikel; Lilli Palmer
- Music by: Emmanuel Vardi
- Country of origin: United States
- Original language: English

Production
- Producer: David Susskind
- Running time: 124 minutes
- Production company: Talent Associates

Original release
- Network: ABC
- Release: November 26, 1967

The Diary of Anne Frank is a 1967 TV film based on the posthumously published 1947 book The Diary of a Young Girl by Anne Frank. The teleplay was directed by Alex Segal and it was adapted by James Lee from the 1955 play of the same name by Albert Hackett and Frances Goodrich. The film starred Max von Sydow, Diana Davila, Peter Beiger, Theodore Bikel and Lilli Palmer.

== Plot ==
In 1942, the Netherlands, a Nazi-occupied country, has become a place where Jews are being captured and murdered by the Nazis. Otto Frank and his family go into hiding in the office building of his company, Opekta, assisted by his Christian friends and co-workers: Victor Kugler, Johannes Kleiman, Miep Santrouschitz-Gies and Bep Voskuijl. During this uncomfortable time in hiding, Otto's teenage daughter, Anne Frank, describes in her diary the unbearable circumstances of life inside the "annex", as well as the injustices occurring in the world outside.

== Cast ==
- Diana Davila as Anne Frank
- Max von Sydow as Otto Frank
- Lilli Palmer as Edith Frank
- Marisa Pavan as Margot Frank
- Theodore Bikel as Hans van Daan
- Viveca Lindfors as Petronella van Daan
- Peter Beiger as Peter van Daan
- Donald Pleasence as Albert Dussel
- Suzanne Grossman as Miep
- Paul Andor as Mr. Kraler

== See also ==
- List of Holocaust films
- List of films about Anne Frank
- Anne Frank Remembered, a 1995 TV documentary about Anne Frank
- The Attic: The Hiding of Anne Frank, a 1988 TV miniseries about Anne Frank
- Anne Frank: The Whole Story, a 2001 TV miniseries about Anne Frank
