= Heinz Unger =

German orchestra conductor (1895–1965)

- Born: 14 December 1895; Berlin, Germany
- Died: 25 February 1965 (aged 69) Toronto, Ontario, Canada
- Genres: Classical
- Occupation: Conductor
- Years active: 1919–1965

Heinz Unger (14 December 1895 – 25 February 1965) was a German conductor, known particularly for conducting the works of Gustav Mahler. In later life, he lived in Britain and Canada.

== Early career ==
Unger was born in Berlin, the son of a lawyer, and at first he studied law. In 1915, in Munich where he was studying, he heard Mahler's Das Lied von der Erde, conducted by Bruno Walter, which was influential in his decision to become a conductor. From 1916 to 1919 he studied at the Berlin Conservatory and was taught by, among others, Wilhelm Klatte and Fritz Stiedry.

In 1919 he conducted his first professional concert, with the Berlin Philharmonic Orchestra; it was the first of several concerts with this orchestra, which included Mahler's Symphony No. 1 and Das Lied von der Erde. In 1921 he founded and conducted the Choir of St Cecilia of Berlin. In 1923 he conducted the Berlin Philharmonic Orchestra and the Berlin Symphony Orchestra together in a performance of Mahler's Symphony No. 8. He was guest conductor in several German cities, and in Vienna and Oslo. During the 1920s he made several tours of the Soviet Union; from 1934 to 1936 he was conductor of the Leningrad Radio Orchestra for annual six-month seasons.

== In Britain ==
In 1933 Unger emigrated to Britain. He conducted the Northern Philharmonia Orchestra until 1947, and was a guest of other British orchestras, including the London Philharmonic Orchestra with which he made many appearances. On 21 October 1945 he conducted this orchestra in the first complete performance in Britain of Mahler's Symphony No. 5.

== In Canada ==
Having made his debut in North America with the Toronto Symphony Orchestra in Canada in 1937, and returning there in 1938, Unger settled in Toronto in 1948. He was a guest conductor of the Promenade Symphony Orchestra, which gave concerts at the Varsity Arena in Toronto. He also conducted the CBC Symphony Orchestra, and was guest conductor for other orchestras in Canada.

In 1953 the York Concert Society was formed: an orchestra made up of members of the Toronto Symphony Orchestra and the CBC Symphony Orchestra, conducted by Unger, gave an annual series of four spring concerts. These continued until Unger's death in 1965.

He also appeared as conductor in Spain, Latin America, Switzerland, Germany and Britain. In 1956 he conducted two concerts with the Berlin Philharmonic; this was his first return to Berlin since 1933.

He gave the premieres of works by several Canadian composers. His repertoire was large, but was primarily of composers of Germany and Austria. In 1958 he became an honorary director of the Gustav Mahler Society of America.

Unger died in Toronto in 1965.

== Heinz Unger Award ==
The Heinz Unger Award, given to young professional conductors in Canada, was established in 1968 by the York Concert Society.

== See also ==
=== Archives ===
There is a Heinz Unger fonds at Library and Archives Canada. The archival reference number is R14051.
