= Geoffrey Waddington =

Canadian conductor and violinist

Geoffrey Waddington (September 23, 1904, Leicester, England - January 3, 1966, Toronto) was a Canadian conductor and violinist.

Waddington was raised in Lethbridge, Alberta, where he began playing violin as a child; he was conducting by the time he was twelve years old. In 1922, he began working in radio and also took a position at the Toronto Conservatory of Music. In 1947 he began conducting for the CBC, eventually becoming its music director. In 1952 he founded the CBC Symphony Orchestra, which he directed until it folded in 1964, by which time it was the last surviving network-broadcasting symphonic orchestra in North America. His position at CBC made him influential in identifying and popularizing Canadian classical musicians of distinction, and he commissioned several works from Canadian composers.
