= Louis Plaidy =

German piano teacher and compiler of books of technical music studies (1810–1874)

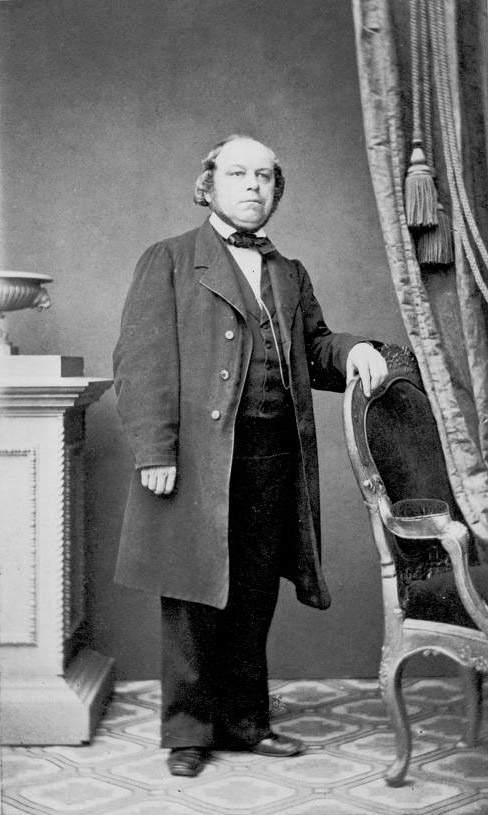
- Born: November 28, 1810; Hubertusburg, Saxony
- Died: March 3, 1874 (aged 63); Grimma, Saxony
- Occupation: Piano pedagogue
- Notable work: Technische Studien: für das Pianofortespiel

Louis Plaidy (28 November 1810 – 3 March 1874) was a German piano pedagogue and compiler of books of technical music studies.

== Life ==
Born in Hubertusburg, Saxony, Plaidy initially focused on the violin, and toured as a concert violinist, but he later studied the piano, particularly the technical aspects of playing. Plaidy was renowned for his ability to impart technical skills to his students.

In 1843, Felix Mendelssohn invited Plaidy to join the faculty of the Leipzig Conservatory to teach the piano. The Conservatory attracted many international students, including the original directors of the Oberlin Conservatory (founded in 1867 in Ohio, US), who went on to use Plaidy's piano methods. Plaidy was Edvard Grieg's first piano teacher at the Conservatory, although Grieg found Plaidy's style of teaching uninspiring. Plaidy remained at the Conservatory until 1865, when he went on to teach piano students privately.

Plaidy published a book on piano pedagogy, Technische Studien für das Pianofortespiel, which was highly thought of and is still used today, and a pamphlet, Der Klavierlehrer, said to be of little worth.

He died in Grimma, Saxony, aged 63.

== Notable students ==
See: List of music students by teacher: N to Q#Louis Plaidy.

Plaidy's notable students included:

- Dudley Buck, American composer.
- Hans von Bülow, German conductor, virtuoso pianist, and composer.
- Frederic Hymen Cowen, British composer.
- Gustave Gagnon, Canadian organist and composer.
- Frederick Grant Gleason, American composer and director of the Chicago Conservatory.
- Edvard Grieg, Norwegian composer and pianist.
- Leoš Janáček, Czech composer.
- Michael Maybrick, English singer and composer.
- James Cutler Dunn Parker, American organist, educator and composer.
- Oscar Paul
- Julius Röntgen, German-Dutch composer.
- Ernst Rudorff, German composer.
- Samuel Sanford
- Gustav Schreck, German composer.
- Arthur Sullivan, English composer.
- Franklin Taylor, English pianist and piano pedagogue

== Works ==
- Technische Studien: für das Pianofortespiel (in German). Leipzig: Breitkopf & Härtel. 1868.
- Der Klavierlehrer [The piano teacher] (in German). Leipzig: Breitkopf & Härtel. 1874.
