= John Ashton (music publisher) =

American merchant and music publisher

John Ashton was an American merchant and music publisher in Boston, Massachusetts, in the 19th century. He owned a "music & umbrella store" at no.197 Washington Street which sold "all the new and fashionable music" ca.1819-1844. He manufactured and sold musical instruments; tuned pianos; and published and sold sheet music "of marches, waltzes, rondos, variations, quadrilles, gallopades, dances, &c. ... arranged for the band, orchestra, piano forte, guitar, flute, violin, organ &c." Among the composers represented in Ashton's stock: Comer, Joseph Haydn, Knight, Paddon, Russell, Shaw, Webb, Charles Zeuner. The firm "John Ashton & Co." was dissolved on January 1, 1844 with notice that the business will "be continued at the old stand, 197 Washington Street, by E.H. Wade."

== Images ==
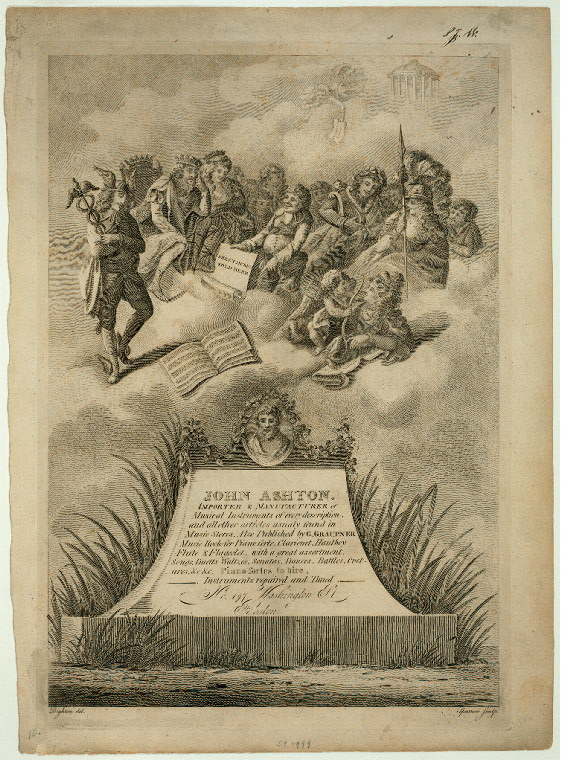
Advertisement for John Ashton, "importer & manufacturer of musical instruments," ca.1824 (New York Public Library)

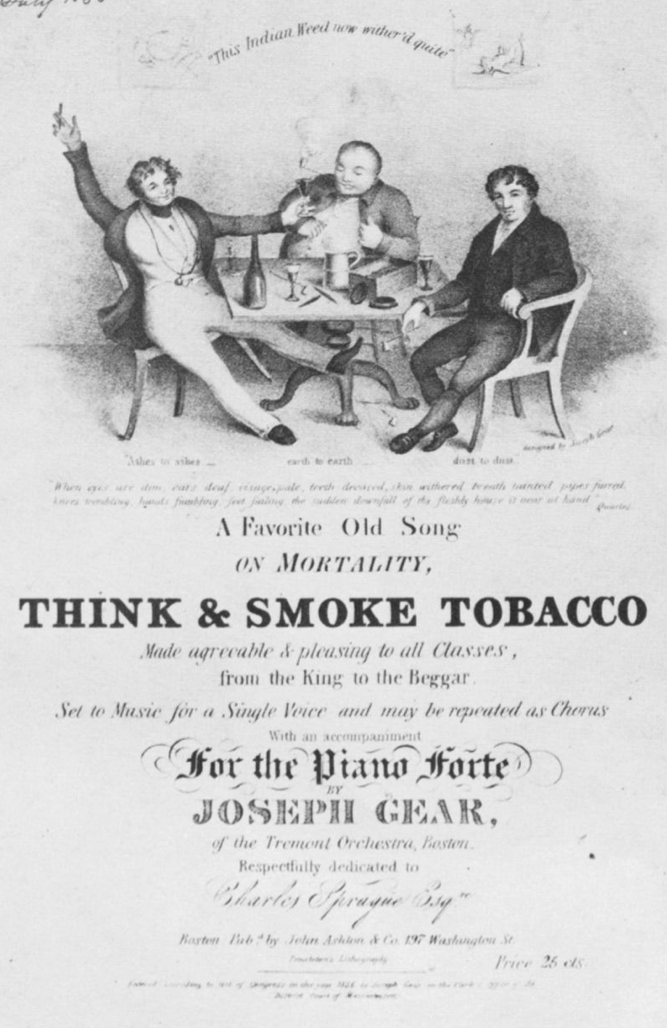
"On Mortality, Think & Smoke Tobacco. ... With an accompaniment for the piano forte by Joseph Gear, of the Tremont Orchestra, Boston. Respectfully dedicated to Charles Sprague, Esq. Boston, John Ashton, 1836."

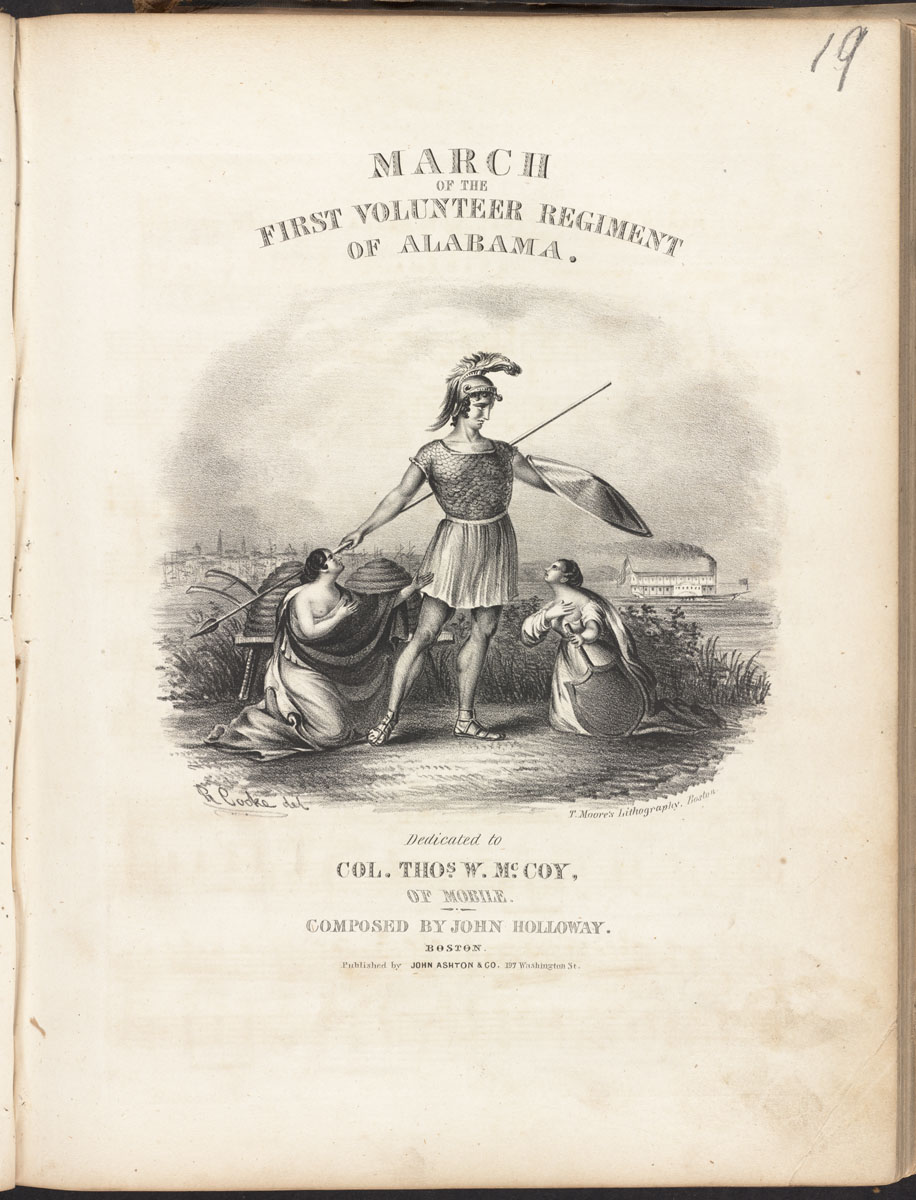
"March of the First Volunteer Regiment of Alabama. Dedicated to Col. Thos. W. McCoy of Mobile. Composed by John Holloway. Boston. Published by John Ashton & Co." (Boston Public Library)
