= A Hatful of Music =

- Genre: Music
- Presented by: Ernie Prentice
- Starring: Bob Switzer
- Country of origin: Canada
- Original language: English
- No. of seasons: 1

Production
- Producer: Jim Winter
- Running time: 30 minutes

Original release
- Network: CBC Television
- Release: 24 July – 25 September 1960

A Hatful of Music is a Canadian musical variety television program that aired on CBC Television in 1960.

== Premise ==
The series was a mid-year substitute for The Joan Fairfax Show, presenting several styles of popular music including jazz, folk and Broadway. Ernie Prentice hosted the series, while Bob Switzer was its announcer. Ricky Hyslop directed the programme's band while Pat Trudell led the show's chorus and Bud Spencer performing as the shows lead singer.

Lorraine Foreman, Tommy Vickers with dancers Sherrill Morton, Peggy Rae Norman, and Mitch Hrushwy regularly performed on the series. Guests included Eleanor Collins, Dolores Claman, The Coronados, Phil Ford, The Four Lads, Tom Hill, Mimi Hines, Susan Johnston, Juliette, Jan Rubeš, and Heather Thomson.

== Production ==
The series was produced by Jim Winter in Vancouver and recorded before a live audience.

== Scheduling ==
The half-hour series aired Sundays at 7:30 p.m. (Eastern).
