= Arnold Spohr =

Canadian ballet dancer, choreographer and artistic director

- Born: December 26, 1923; Rhein, Saskatchewan, Canada
- Died: April 12, 2010 (aged 86); Winnipeg, Manitoba, Canada
- Occupation: Former Artistic Director of Royal Ballet of Canada
- Years active: 1958–1988
- Height: 6 ft (1.8 m)
- Dancing career
- Former groups: Winnipeg Ballet
- Dances: Spohr Gala

Arnold Theodore Spohr, CC (December 23, 1923 – April 12, 2010) was a Canadian ballet dancer, choreographer, and artistic director.

Spohr was born in Rhein, Saskatchewan. From 1945 to 1954, he danced with the Royal Winnipeg Ballet, and was the artistic director of the company from 1958 to 1988, during which time he brought the company to international fame.

In 1970, he was made an Officer of the Order of Canada and was promoted to Companion in 2003. In 2000, he was awarded the Order of Manitoba. In 1998, Spohr received the Governor General's Performing Arts Award, Canada's highest honour in the performing arts, for his lifetime contribution to dance.

Spohr died on April 12, 2010, of chronic kidney disease in a Winnipeg long-term care centre at the age of 86.
