= Barbara Byrne =

American rower

Barbara Byrne is an American rower. In the 1995 World Rowing Championships (Finland) she won a gold medal in the women's lightweight coxless four event. She also won a bronze medal in the 1993 World Rowing Championships held in the Czech Republic in the same event. Rowed at Princeton University and was a member of the women's open varsity 4+ that won the Eastern Sprints (1988) and won a collegiate national championship in the lightweight women's 8+ (1988). Won United States National championships in the 8+, 4-, 2-, 4x in the 1990s. US bronze medalist in the lightweight women's 1x in 1996.

She is also the daughter of former Governor Brendan Byrne of New Jersey.
