= Richard Conrad =

American opera singer

- Born: August 12, 1935; Astoria, Queens, New York, U.S.
- Died: August 26, 2019 (aged 84); Eliot, Maine, U.S.
- Education: State University of New York at Farmingdale; Boston University
- Occupation: Opera singer

Richard Conrad (August 12, 1935 – August 26, 2019) was an American singer, voice teacher, and impresario whose voice at times inhabited both the tenor and baritone ranges. He sang in opera, cabaret and musicals. He is perhaps best known for his 1963 recorded collaboration with Joan Sutherland and Marilyn Horne, conducted by Richard Bonynge, known as The Age of Bel Canto.

== Biography ==
Born in Astoria, Queens, Richard Conrad studied in Boston with Harry Euler Treiber, in Germany with Gisela Rohmert, and had other studies under Felix Wolfes, Aksel Schiøtz and Pierre Bernac. In his early years Conrad was a light baritone. He soon developed the ability to pass easily into the "head" register as well as the technical facility to manage the most intricate florid passages. Treiber and others began to recommend that he might emulate the "baritones" of the 18th and early 19th centuries, many of whom sang as tenors, and he began exploring the bel canto and unusual coloratura tenor repertoire. His operatic debut was in Boston in 1961, singing in the American premiere of Mozart's La finta semplice, and later that year he made his recital debut in Washington, DC. In 1963 he was brought to the attention of Joan Sutherland and Richard Bonynge, with whom he made a series of historic recordings of the florid bel canto repertoire.

In 1966 he settled in Rome, Italy and performed in opera, with orchestra, in recital, and on radio and television in many countries of Europe, England, the United States, Canada, and Africa. He returned to Boston in 1980 and founded the Boston Academy of Music (a reincarnation of a previously defunct organization of the same name). He managed the concert and opera repertory company for 23 years, presenting the American premiere of Sir Arthur Sullivan's grand opera Ivanhoe and many operas which had never been heard in Boston (Richard Strauss's Arabella, the original version of Verdi's La forza del destino, Rossini's La pietra del paragone, and many others). Subsequently he founded and led The Bostonian Opera and Concert Ensemble ("The Bostonians") with which he produced (and sang the role of Golaud) the New England premiere of the original version of Debussy's Pelléas et Mélisande, which was recorded by ARSIS AUDIO.

In 1983 he was the victim of a street mugging in which his voice was severely injured. After a long period of rehabilitation and retraining (under Gisela Rohmert at the Lichtenberger Institut in Germany), he reemerged (again as a baritone), specializing in the comic roles of Gilbert and Sullivan and the Italian bel canto composers.

In 1985 he began touring in revues of music by Cole Porter, Jacques Brel, Jerome Kern, Kurt Weill and Noël Coward. He made his theater debut in the premiere of Janet Hood and Bill Russell's Elegies for Angels, Punks and Raging Queens (New York 1990), and sang in the premiere of Move! at the Carre Theater in Amsterdam the following year. He has also enjoyed a success as Albin in La Cage aux Folles and as Cervantes/Don Quixote in Man of La Mancha.

Additional singing premieres include the American premiere of Haydn's Orfeo ed Euridice (1966), and the world premiere of Niccolò Castiglioni's I tre misteri (1968). As a producer, he sang and directed the American premiere of the two-act version of Donizetti's Maria Stuarda, and in 2003 he created the role of Montressor in Daniel Pinkham's The Cask of Amontillado.

For many years he was based in Boston, where his activities included teaching and mentoring, production, and stage direction, in addition to singing.

For his 70th birthday in 2005, he presented a recital of arias and songs at Massachusetts Institute of Technology. The composers included Noël Coward, Sir Arthur Sullivan, Ralph Vaughan Williams, Daniel Pinkham, Janet Hood and Henry Bishop. In 2011 he celebrated the 50th anniversary of his debut with over 40 colleagues at MIT's Kresge Auditorium.

Richard Conrad died on August 26, 2019.

== Recording ==
Conrad's recordings include:

- The Age of Bel Canto, with Joan Sutherland and Marilyn Horne; Richard Bonynge conducting the London Symphony Orchestra and the New Symphony Orchestra of London
- Samuel Barber: Vanessa, complete recording
- Arthur Sullivan: "Guinevere and Other Ballads"
- Songs by Stephen Foster
- Ezra Sims: Chamber Cantata on Chinese Poems
- Noël Coward: "A Room With a View": Noël Coward songs, with William Merrill, piano.
