= Jean Vallerand =

Canadian musician (1915–1994)

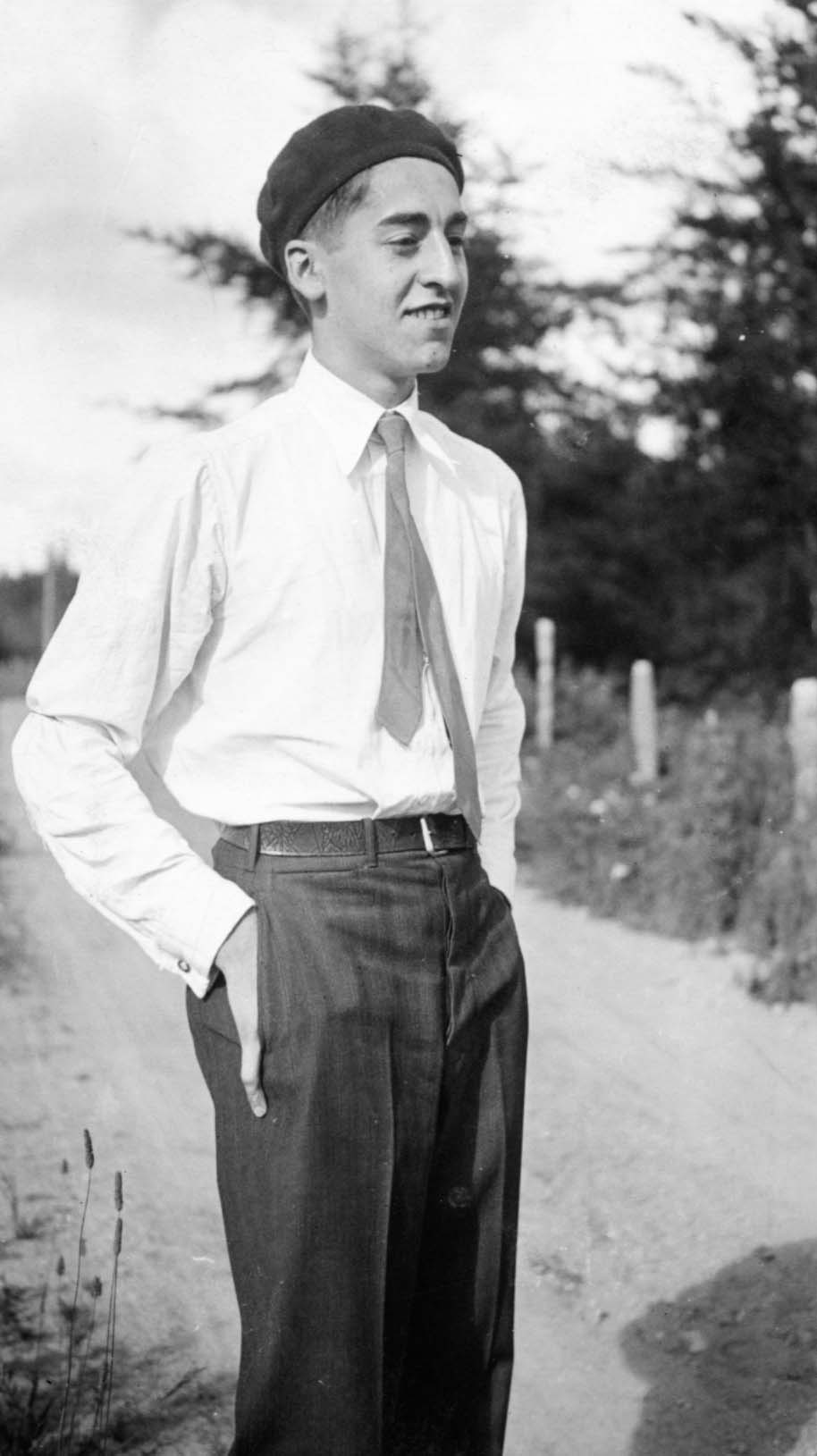
- Vallerand in 1932
- Born: December 24, 1915; Montreal, Quebec, Canada
- Died: June 24, 1994 (aged 78)
- Occupations: Composer, educator

Jean Vallerand, CQ (December 24, 1915 – June 24, 1994) was a composer, music critic, violinist, conductor, arts administrator, writer, and music educator from Quebec. As a composer he was active from 1935 to 1969. An associate of the Canadian Music Centre, he was appointed a Knight of the National Order of Quebec in 1991.

== Life ==
Born in Montreal, Quebec, Vallerand began studying the violin at age 5 with Lucien Sicotte, with whom he continued to study until he was 20. He entered the Université de Montréal in 1934 where he studied classical literature, earning a diploma there in 1938. While there he pursued private studies in music theory and music composition with Claude Champagne from 1935 to 1942.

Vallerand began his career as a music critic in 1941 when he succeeded Léo-Pol Morin as critic for the Montreal newspaper Le Canada. He remained there through 1946, going on to hold posts as music critic at Montréal-Matin (1948–1949), Le Devoir (1952–1961), Le Nouveau Journal (a daily newspaper founded in Montreal by Angélina Berthiaume-Du Tremblay 1961–1962), and La Presse (1962–1966). He also reviewed cultural events for CBC Radio and CBC Television during the 1940s through the 1960s. He contributed articles to numerous (little known) periodicals and journals, including L'Action universitaire, Amérique francaise, Culture vivante, Gants du ciel, Liberté, Maclean, Musical America, Relations, and Vie musicale. He also worked as the program annotator for the Montreal Symphony Orchestra for many years appeared numerous times as a host for the French-language version of the Metropolitan Opera radio broadcasts.

In 1942 Vallerand was appointed Secretary General of the newly formed Conservatoire de musique du Québec à Montréal (CMQM) by Wilfrid Pelletier. He remained in that post and taught orchestration at the school up through 1963. He also taught concurrently on the music faculty of the Université de Montréal from 1950 to 1966. From 1963 to 1956 he served as the head of the Montreal branch of CBC Radio and from 1966 to 1970 he was the Quebec Government's cultural attaché in Paris.

In 1971 Vallerand became the head of the Conservatoire de musique et d'art dramatique du Québec (CMADQ) which at that time oversaw 8 conservatories in higher education in music and theatre in Québec. He remained in that position through 1978, during which time he was instrumental in establishing a 9th conservatoire, the Conservatoire de musique du Québec à Rimouski, in 1973. He also served concurrently as the director of music education for the Ministère des Affaires culturelles du Québec (MACQ) in 1971, and was then repositioned as director of performing arts for the organization from 1971 though 1975. In 1977–1978 he was secretary general of the Orchestre des jeunes du Québec. He also worked as a consultant for the CMQM and the MACQ throughout the 1970s. He retired in 1980.

== Selected works ==
- Les Roses à la mer, 1935
- Le Diable dans le beffroi, 1942
- Nocturne, 1946
- Prélude, 1948
- Sonata for Violin and Piano, 1950
- Concerto for Orchestra, 1951
- Quatre Poèmes de Saint-Denys Garneau, 1954
- String Quartet, 1955
- Réverbérations contractoires, 1961
- Le Magicien, opera, 1961
- Payse, Ballett, 1964
- Étude concertante for Violin and Orchestra, 1969
