= Jo Maxwell-Muller =

Former British actress

Josephine Ann Maxwell-Muller (July 1944 – 30 October 2010) was a British actress.

She was born in Hendon in London in 1944, the daughter of Flight Lieutenant (later Wing Commander) Leon Maxwell-Muller OBE, RAF (1913–1984) and Beryl née Hobbs (1915–2008).

1964 was a productive year for Maxwell-Muller. On the insistence of Christopher Plummer she was cast as Ophelia in the BBC's television production Hamlet at Elsinore (1964), a co-production with the Danmarks Radio Company. In 1964 she played Bertha, the daughter, opposite Trevor Howard in Strindberg's play The Father. Also in 1964 Maxwell-Muller played Consuelo in He Who Gets Slapped at the Hampstead Theatre. In 1966 Jonathan Miller cast her in the non-speaking role of Alice's sister in his BBC television play Alice in Wonderland.

Other television and film roles include Wendy in The Flying Swan (1965); Miss Carter/Fiona in ITV Play of the Week (1966); Sarah Fawcett in Hadleigh (1971); Queen/Cuckoo in Jackanory Playhouse (1979); Margaret Jennings in Emmerdale (1979), and Grief-stricken Woman in Trauma (2004).

Her theatre appearances include Lucy in The Rivals (1966) for the Library Theatre Company at the Library Theatre in Manchester; Cathleen the maid opposite Laurence Olivier as James in Long Day's Journey into Night (1971) at the National Theatre in London; Sisly Milkpail in A Woman Killed with Kindness (1971) at The Old Vic in London; Lady Sybil Tenterden in What Every Woman Knows (1972) for the Farnham Repertory Company at the Castle Theatre in Farnham in Surrey; Maria in The School for Scandal (1972) for the National Theatre at The Old Vic, London; and Stella Kowalski in A Streetcar Named Desire (1976) at the Queen's Theatre in Hornchurch. She was Kitty in Moving House (1976) with the Farnham Repertory Company at the Redgrave Theatre in Farnham in Surrey.

In 1974 she married the actor Anthony Heaton (1947–1987) in Birmingham in the West Midlands.

On her death in Hampstead in 2010 her funeral service was held at Golders Green Crematorium following which her ashes were interred in the grave of her husband in Hampstead Cemetery.
