= Diedre Irons =

Canadian-born New Zealand concert pianist

Diedre Irons ONZM MBE
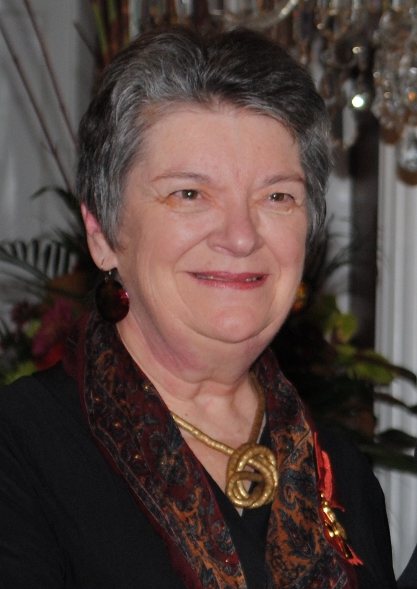
- Irons in 2011

Background information
- Born: 9 March 1945 (age 81); Winnipeg, Manitoba, Canada
- Genre: Classical
- Occupation: Concert pianist
- Instrument: Piano

Diedre Allison Irons ONZM MBE (born 9 March 1945) is a Canadian-born concert pianist who has been based in New Zealand since 1977.

== Biography ==
Irons was a child prodigy and a star pupil of the Russian-born Canadian composer and virtuoso pianist Sophie-Carmen Eckhardt-Gramatté. At the age of 12, she made a debut with the Winnipeg Symphony Orchestra, performing the Schumann piano concerto.

She studied at the University of Manitoba, and then went on to the Curtis Institute of Music in Philadelphia where she completed a Diploma in Performance, studying with Mieczyslaw Horszowski and Rudolf Serkin. Irons was subsequently a member of the teaching staff of the Curtis Institute for nine years from 1968 to 1977.

Irons moved to New Zealand in 1977, and became a naturalised New Zealand citizen in 1981. She was a teacher at the University of Canterbury from 1992 to 2003.

Irons has performed in many countries as a concert soloist and as a member of chamber music ensembles. She toured 25 countries with the Slovenian violinist Miha Pogačnik between 1984 and 1991, giving piano master classes and concerts. In New Zealand she has collaborated with Alexander Ivashkin, Michael Houstoun, Jan Tawroszewics, and the New Zealand String Quartet. Her international collaborations include the Kodály Quartet, the Kocian Quartet and the Latin American String Quartets.

Irons has appeared many times with the Christchurch Symphony Orchestra, the Auckland Philharmonia Orchestra and the New Zealand Symphony Orchestra. She has also appeared frequently on television and radio and has many recordings. Her discography includes the five Beethoven piano concertos.

== Honours and awards ==
In the 1989 New Year Honours, Irons was appointed a Member of the Order of the British Empire, for services to music. In 2007 she was awarded the degree of Doctor of Music (honoris causa) from Brandon University in Manitoba, Canada, "in recognition of outstanding contributions in the world of music through superlative achievement as a talented, dedicated and passionate pianist". In the 2011 Queen's Birthday Honours, she was made an Officer of the New Zealand Order of Merit, for services to music.
