= Henry Prentiss =

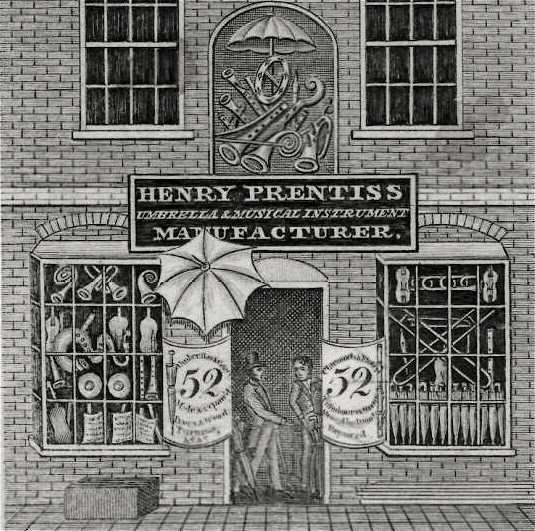
Henry Prentiss' shop in Boston, ca.1830

Henry Prentiss (1801–1859) manufactured musical instruments, umbrellas and published sheet music, which he sold from his shop on Court Street in Boston, Massachusetts, in the 19th century.

One example of a piece of sheet music sold by Prentiss was a song named Our Country by Hon. George Lunt in 1847.
