= Boston Academy of Music =

The Boston Academy of Music is an institute of higher education in the field of music, located in Boston, Massachusetts. It was founded in 1833 by Lowell Mason and William Channing Woodbridge. It was the first music school of its kind in the country. In the 1830s-1840s it occupied the Odeon on Federal Street.

In 1982, the "Boston Academy of Music" was revived by the singer Richard Conrad, who led it for 23 years. In 2003, the name of the non-profit company was changed from "Boston Academy of Music" to "Opera Boston", and it continued until the end of 2011. In 2013, "Boston Academy of Music" was revived a second time by the singer and impresario Peter Terry.

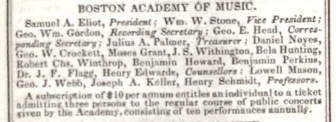
Boston Academy of Music, 1839
