= Heather Thomson (soprano) =

Canadian soprano (born 1940)

Heather Thomson (born December 7, 1940) is a Canadian soprano.

Born in Vancouver, Thomson studied from 1954 until 1961 with Phylis Inglis, in the latter year winning a prize at the CBC Talent Festival. She underwent further studies at the Royal Conservatory of Music in Toronto, and debuted as the Dew Fairy in Hansel and Gretel with the Canadian Opera Company in 1962. The following season she sang Mimi for the same company, with which she continued to appear throughout her career in roles such as Marguerite, Tatiana, and Heloise in the premiere of Charles Wilson's Heloise and Abelard in 1973. She debuted at Sadler's Wells in 1966. In 1969 she bowed at the New York City Opera as Marguerite. A finalist in the Metropolitan Opera regional auditions in 1961, she was a winner at the 1964 San Francisco Opera auditions. Later in her career Thomson lived in Connecticut and taught voice. She is married to the American tenor Perry Price; their son, Stephen, is a musical theatre performer. She has also taught at the University of British Columbia.
