= Charles Zeuner =

American organist and composer

Charles Zeuner (20 September 1795 Eisleben, Saxony – 7 November 1857 Philadelphia) was an American organist and composer originally active in Germany, then in Boston and Philadelphia in the United States.

== Biography ==
He was baptized as Heinrich Christoph, but changed his name when he came to the United States, probably in 1830, though some reports say 1824. He studied with Johann Nepomuk Hummel and Michael Gotthard Fischer. He settled in Boston where he made his debut as organist, pianist and vocalist on 13 February 1830. He was organist for Park Street Church and the Handel and Haydn Society 1830–1837. His oratorio “The Feast of Tabernacles,” which was published in 1832, was premiered by the Boston Academy of Music in 1837 at the Odeon. It was the first work of its kind composed in America. He was appointed president of the Handel and Haydn Society in 1838.

A disagreement with the trustees led to his resignation from the Handel and Haydn Society in 1839. He departed for Philadelphia where he was organist for St. Andrew's Episcopal Church and then Arch Street Presbyterian Church. For several years, he showed symptoms of insanity; these, at first, were not thought by others to be serious, but on a trip to West Philadelphia he committed suicide.

== Legacy ==
He raised the standard for classical music in the United States. His manuscripts and printed scores went to the Newland/Zeuner collection of the Library of Congress.

== Works ==
Besides his oratorio, he issued some collections of music, notably “The American Harp” (Boston, 1839) and “Ancient Lyre” (1848). He also wrote a piece for organ entitled "Rail Road Waltz" and two concertos for organ and orchestra.
