= CBC Symphony Orchestra =

Canadian radio orchestra

- Orchestra
- Native name: Orchestre symphonique de la SRC
- Short name: CBCSO/OSSRC
- Founded: 1952; 74 years ago
- Disbanded: 1964; 62 years ago
- Location: Toronto, Ontario

The CBC Symphony Orchestra (French: Orchestre symphonique de la SRC; CBCSO/OSSRC) was a radio orchestra based in Toronto, Ontario, Canada. It was operated by the Canadian Broadcasting Corporation during the 1950s and 1960s.

== History ==
The CBCSO was founded in 1952, and gave its first broadcast on 29 September 1952 performing Jean Sibelius's Symphony No. 3 and the overture to Gioachino Rossini's opera La Cenerentola. Conductor Geoffrey Waddington served as the orchestra's only music director, although other conductors, such as Jean-Marie Beaudet, had strong ties with the orchestra. The CBCSO consisted of 80 instrumentalists of which approximately half were also members of the Toronto Symphony Orchestra. Violinist Albert Pratz was concertmaster of the orchestra from 1953–1961.

The CBCSO played weekly broadcasts on CBC Radio and also made frequent appearances on CBC Television. The orchestra performed internationally, including a tour in London, England, and a performance at the Inter-American Music Festival in 1961. Many of its performances were recorded by Radio Canada International and distributed outside Canada. The orchestra recorded with the Mendelssohn Choir, with CBC's Festival Singers, and with pianist Glenn Gould.

The CBCSO performed and recorded many of the works of composer/conductor Igor Stravinsky, including his Symphony of Psalms, which featured Stravinsky as conductor and violinist Steven Staryk as concertmaster.

The orchestra was disbanded in 1964.
