= List of Festival (Canadian TV series) episodes =

The following is an episode list of the Canadian CBC Television anthology series, Festival.

The series premiered on 10 October 1960, with the episode, "H.M.S. Pinafore", and aired for nine seasons until 26 March 1969. Episode duration typically ranged from one hour to ninety minutes. A few episodes in seasons five and eight, and several episodes in seasons six and seven, were as short as thirty minutes. Special episodes ranged from two to three hours in duration.

== Series overview ==
Series	Episodes	Originally released		Day / Time	Duration	Specials
Series	Episodes	First released	Last released	Day / Time	Duration	Specials
1	25	10 October 1960	19 June 1961	Monday, 9:30 p.m.	60–90	100–120
2	25	2 October 1961	11 June 1962	Monday, 9:30 p.m.	60–90	120
3	25	1 October 1962	20 May 1963	Monday, 9:30 p.m.	60–90	135
4	29	2 October 1963	24 June 1964	Wednesday, 9:30 p.m.	60–90	120–170
5	27	7 October 1964	30 June 1965	Wednesday, 9:30 p.m.	60-90	—N/a
6	32	15 September 1965	6 July 1966	Wednesday, 9:30 p.m.	30–90	120–155
7	20	14 September 1966	10 May 1967	Wednesday, 9:30 p.m.	30–90	—N/a
8	13	4 October 1967	8 May 1968	Wednesday, 9:30 p.m.	30–90	—N/a
9	14	30 October 1968	26 March 1969	Wednesday, 9:30 p.m.	60–90	120

== Episodes ==
Festival was occasionally pre-empted (e.g., the week of 10 April 1961) with other programming, such as specials from the Omnibus or Hallmark Hall of Fame series, or by sports (NHL hockey, football), or by other special programs. These are noted above the episode tables that follow.

=== Season 1 (1960–61) ===
Notes:

- For four weeks, the Montreal 9.30 p.m. time-slot was listed as "Festival '61–Omnibus" replacing CBC productions with programming by the American educational variety series, Omnibus (hosted by Alistair Cooke, featuring plays, music performances, and discussions). The Omnibus episode titles and their Festival air dates follow: "Night People" (5 December 1960), "Abraham Lincoln: The Early Years" (30 January 1961), "Fierce, Funny and Far Out" (27 February 1961), and "An Omnibus of American Song" (20 March 1961).
- For three other weeks, other programs aired; The Bell Telephone Hour on 28 November 1960, the Hallmark Hall of Fame Christmas opera The Golden Child on 12 December 1960, and NHL Hockey on 10 April 1961.
- For the week of 17 April 1961, "The Subject is Beethoven" was re-aired. It originally aired the week of 6 February 1961.

No. overall	No. in season	Title	Directed by	Written by	Original release date	Ref.
1	1	"H.M.S. Pinafore"	Norman Campbell	Gilbert and Sullivan	10 October 1960	
2	2	"Colombe"	Mario Prizek	Play by : Jean Anouilh; Adapted by : Ivor Barry	17 October 1960	
3	3	"The Old Ladies"	Eric Till	Novel by : Hugh Walpole; Dramatization by : Rodney Ackland; Adapted by : Bernard Slade	31 October 1960	
4	4	"Peking Opera"	Unknown	Unknown	21 November 1960	
5	5	"Julius Caesar"	Paul Almond	Play by : William Shakespeare; Adapted by : Paul Almond	19 December 1960	
6	6	"Ring Round the Moon"	Mario Prizek	Play by : Jean Anouilh; Translated by : Christopher Fry	2 January 1961	
7	7	"Home of the Brave"	Harvey Hart	Play by : Arthur Laurents; Adapted by : Allan Manings	9 January 1961	
8	8	"Lord Arthur Savile's Crime"	Norman Campbell	Story by : Oscar Wilde; Adapted by : Rita Greer Allen	16 January 1961	
9	9	"Elektra"	Franz Kraemer	Opera by : Richard Strauss; Translated by : Franz Kraemer	23 January 1961	
10	10	"The Subject is Beethoven"	Unknown	Ludwig van Beethoven	6 February 1961	
11	11	"Three Sisters"	Mario Prizek	Play by : Anton Chekhov; Adapted by : Desmond Scott	13 February 1961	
12	12	"Night Must Fall"	Unknown	Play by : Emlyn Williams; Adapted by : Hugh Webster	20 February 1961	
13	13	"The Dumb Waiter"	Unknown	Harold Pinter	6 March 1961	
13	13	"The Zoo Story"	Unknown	Edward Albee	6 March 1961	
14	14	"Orphee"	Pierre Mercure	Christoph Willibald Gluck	13 March 1961	
15	15	"Great Expectations"	Eric Till	Novel by : Charles Dickens; Adapted by : Eric Till	27 March 1961	
16	16	"Royal Gambit"	Unknown	Play by : Hermann Gressieker; Adapted by : George White	3 April 1961	
17	17	"Pictures in the Hallway"	Eric Till	Autobiography by : Seán O'Casey; Adapted by : Paul Shyer	24 April 1961	
18	18	"The Dybbuk"	Harvey Hart	Play by : S. Ansky; Adapted by : Mac Shoub	1 May 1961	
19	19	"The Police"	Unknown	Play by : Sławomir Mrożek; Adapted by : Jack Kruper	8 May 1961	
20	20	"Falstaff"	Unknown	Opera by : Giuseppe Verdi; Translated by : Chester Kallman & H. Proctor-Gregg	15 May 1961	
21	21	"The Pupil"	Unknown	Story by : Henry James; Adapted by : Michael Dyne	22 May 1961	
22	22	"The Quare Fellow"	Unknown	Brendan Behan	29 May 1961	
23	23	"The Offbeats"	Mario Prizek	Jacques Languirand	5 June 1961	
24	24	"The Killdeer"	Unknown	James Reaney	12 June 1961	
25	25	"The Luck of Ginger Coffey"	Harvey Hart	Novel by : Brian Moore; Adapted by : M. Charles Cohen	19 June 1961	

=== Season 2 (1961–62) ===
Notes:

- Beginning this season, the program was no longer billed as Festival '61, but simply as Festival.
- Most of the weeks in which Festival did not air, programming was pre-empted by special episodes of Camera Canada.
- "The Offshore Island" which aired the week of 12 March 1962, re-aired later in the season on 14 May 1962.
- The week of 2 April 1962 was a repeat of "The Luck of Ginger Coffey" that originally aired the week of 19 June 1961 in season one.

No. overall	No. in season	Title	Directed by	Written by	Original release date	Ref.
26	1	"The Pirates of Penzance"	Norman Campbell	Gilbert and Sullivan	2 October 1961	
27	2	"Ondine"	Harvey Hart	Jean Giraudoux	9 October 1961	
28	3	"The Dream of Peter Mann"	Eric Till	Bernard Kops	16 October 1961	
29	4	"Land of the Old Song"	Unknown	Traditionals	23 October 1961	
30	5	"The Blue Hotel"	Harvey Hart	Play by : Stephen Crane; Adapted by : James Agee	6 November 1961	
31	6	"Carmen"	Irving Guttman	Georges Bizet	20 November 1961	
32	7	"A Sleep of Prisoners"	Paul Almond	Christopher Fry	27 November 1961	
33	8	"Swan Lake"	Norman Campbell	Pyotr Ilyich Tchaikovsky	18 December 1961	
34	9	"A Cradle of Willow"	Eric Till	Dorothy Wright	25 December 1961	
35	10	"The Traveller Without Luggage"	Mario Prizek	Jean Anouilh	1 January 1962	
36	11	"The Day of the Dodo"	George McCowan	Ron Boorne	8 January 1962	
37	12	"The Lady's Not for Burning"	Paul Almond	Christopher Fry	15 January 1962	
38	13	"An Evening with Gilbert and Sullivan"	Norman Campbell	Gilbert and Sullivan	22 January 1962	
39	14	"The Queen and the Rebels"	Harvey Hart	Play by : Ugo Betti; Translated by : Henry Reed; Adapted by : Alvin Goldman	5 February 1962	
40	15	"Elizabeth the Queen"	Unknown	Maxwell Anderson	12 February 1962	
41	16	"Bousille and the Just"	Mario Prizek	Gratien Gélinas	26 February 1962	
42	17	"The Apple Cart"	David Gardner	George Bernard Shaw	5 March 1962	
43	18	"The Offshore Island"	Eric Till	Play by : Marghanita Laski; Adapted by : Hugh Webster	12 March 1962	
44	19	"The Duchess of Malfi"	Mario Prizek	John Webster	19 March 1962	
45	20	"Grand Exits"	Mario Prizek	Play by : Jacques Languirand; Translated by : Ivor Barry	16 April 1962	
46	21	"Macbeth"	Paul Almond	William Shakespeare	23 April 1962	
47	22	"The Brass Pounder from Illinois"	George McCowan	Tommy Tweed	7 May 1962	
48	23	"Eugene Ormandy Conducts"	Unknown	Unknown	21 May 1962	
49	24	"The Collection" "A Slight Ache"	Paul Almond	Harold Pinter	4 June 1962	
50	25	"Stravinsky at 80"	Franz Kraemer	Music by : Igor Stravinsky; Choreography by : George Balanchine; Teleplay by : Ronald Hambleton	11 June 1962	

=== Season 3 (1962–63) ===
Notes:

- Weeks not indicated were pre-empted by special broadcasts such as Camera Canada or The Telephone Hour.
- National election coverage pre-empted Festival on 8 April 1963.
- "A Cradle of Willow" that aired the week of 24 December 1962 is a repeat from season one, the week of 25 December 1961.
- "A Book with Chapters in It" aired twice this season, 8 October 1962 and 29 April 1963.
- "David, Chapter II" aired twice this season, 28 January 1963 and 20 May 1963.
- "Othello" ran 2 hours 15 minutes, compared to the usual 60-90 minutes. Therefore it was originally broadcast at 8:30 EST instead of 9:30.
- "Venus Observed" was originally scheduled for broadcast 7 January 1963, but delayed due to videotape erasure.

No. overall	No. in season	Title	Directed by	Written by	Original release date	Ref.
51	1	"The Lark"	Harvey Hart	Play by : Jean Anouilh; Adapted by : Lillian Hellman	1 October 1962	
52	2	"A Book with Chapters in It"	Eric Till	Jack Pulman	8 October 1962	
53	3	"Richard Strauss: A Personal View"	Mario Prizek	Richard Strauss	15 October 1962	
54	4	"The Gambler"	Harvey Hart	Play by : Ugo Betti; Adapted by : Alvin Goldman	29 October 1962	
55	5	"The Devil's Instrument"	Eric Till	W. O. Mitchell	5 November 1962	
56	6	"Break-Up"	Mario Prizek	Helge Krog	12 November 1962	
57	7	"The Gondoliers"	Norman Campbell	Gilbert and Sullivan	19 November 1962	
58	8	"Serjeant Musgrave's Dance"	Eric Till	John Arden	26 November 1962	
59	9	"An Evening of Mozart"	Unknown	Wolfgang Amadeus Mozart	3 December 1962	
60	10	"Giselle"	Norman Campbell ^{TV} Celia Franca ^{Art}	Libretto by : Saint-Georges & Gautier; Music by : Adolphe Adam	17 December 1962	
61	11	"Tongues of Brass"	Paddy Sampson	Unknown	31 December 1962	
62	12	"Music from the Films"	Norman Campbell	Tony Thomas	21 January 1963	
63	13	"David, Chapter II"	Harvey Hart	M. Charles Cohen	28 January 1963	
64	14	"Ivan"	David Gardner	Anthony Terpiloff	11 February 1963	
65	15	"Venus Observed"	Paul Almond	Christopher Fry	18 February 1963	
66	16	"The Wild Duck"	Harvey Hart	Play by : Henrik Ibsen; Translated by : Eva LaGallienne; Adapted by : Alvin Goldman	25 February 1963	
67	17	"The Anatomy of Fugue"	Eric Till	Unknown	4 March 1963	
68	18	"The Endless Echo"	Mario Prizek	Play by : Jean-Robert Remillard; Translated by : Alvin Goldman	11 March 1963	
69	19	"The Doctor's Dilemma"	David Garner	George Bernard Shaw	18 March 1963	
70	20	"Galileo"	Mario Prizek	Play by : Bertolt Brecht; Adapted by : Lister Sinclair	25 March 1963	
71	21	"Birth of a Symphony"	Unknown	Ludwig van Beethoven	1 April 1963	
72	22	"Laudes Evanglii"	Joan Kemp-Welch	Libretto by : Giorgio Signorini; Music by : Valentino Bucchi; Choreography by : Léonide Massine	15 April 1963	
73	23	"Othello"	Franz Kraemer	Play by : William Shakespeare; Opera by : Giuseppe Verdi	22 April 1963	
74	24	"Ballet Espagnol"	Unknown	Unknown	6 May 1963	
75	25	"The American Dream"	Mario Prizek	Edward Albee	13 May 1963	
75	25	"The Sandbox"	Mario Prizek	Edward Albee	13 May 1963	

=== Season 4 (1963–64) ===
Notes:

- Weeks not indicated were pre-empted by special broadcasts such as Camera Canada, Horizon or Intertel.
- In some but not all markets, NHL hockey playoffs pre-empted the Festival episode "Twelfth Night" on 8 April 1964.
- "Pale Horse, Pale Rider" aired twice this season; 23 October 1963, and 18 March 1964.
- "Diary of a Scoundrel" aired twice this season; 25 December 1963, and 1 April 1964.
- The week of 15 April 1964, Festival was broadcast as a Special Edition at 8:30 PM EST to accommodate the 3-hour (170 minute) debut of the BBC TV / Danmarks Radio co-production of Hamlet at Elsinore to commemorate Shakespeare's 400th birthday.
- "Othello" re-aired this season on 22 April 1964 in honour of Shakespeare's 400th birthday. It originally aired in season three on 22 April 1963. Its duration of 2 hours and 15 minutes is substantially longer than other episodes (60-90 minutes).

No. overall	No. in season	Title	Directed by	Written by	Original release date	Ref.
76	1	"The Mikado"	Norman Campbell	Gilbert and Sullivan	2 October 1963	
77	2	"Antigone"	Paul Almond	Jean Anouilh	9 October 1963	
78	3	"The Labyrinth"	Paul Almond	Charles Israel	16 October 1963	
79	4	"Pale Horse, Pale Rider"	Eric Till	Novel by : Katherine Anne Porter; Adapted by : Fletcher Markle	23 October 1963	
80	5	"Le Médecin malgré lui"	Jean Gascon	Molière	30 October 1963	
81	6	"Viennese Night"	Pierre Mercure	Unknown	6 November 1963	
82	7	"I Spy"	David Garnder	John Mortimer	13 November 1963	
82	7	"A Resounding Tinkle"	David Garnder	N. F. Simpson	13 November 1963	
83	8	"Pierre Boulez, Frenchman, Composer, Conductor"	Pierre Mercure	Music by : Stravinsky · Pierre Boulez · Debussy; Poem by : Stéphane Mallarmé	20 November 1963	
84	9	"The Slave of Truth"	Norman Campbell	Play by : Molière; English v. by : Miles Malleson; Music/Lyrics by : Stan Daniels	27 November 1963	
85	10	"Roots"	Harvey Hart	Play by : Arnold Wesker; Adapted by : Henry Comor	4 December 1963	
86	11	"A Primer on Prima Donnas"	Irving Guttman	Unknown	11 December 1963	
87	12	"Diary of a Scoundrel"	Eric Till	Play by : Alexander Ostrovsky; Translated by : Rodney Ackland; Adapted by : Tony Van Bridge	25 December 1963	
88	13	"Still Life"	Eric Till	Jack Pulman	1 January 1964	
89	14	"Major Barbara"	George McCowan	George Bernard Shaw	8 January 1964	
90	15	"First Love"	Mario Prizek	Novella by : Ivan Turgenev; Adapted by : George Salverson	22 January 1964	
91	16	"A Very Close Family"	Harvey Hart	Bernard Slade	29 January 1964	
92	17	"Pas de Dix"	Eric Till ^{TV} Arnold Spohr ^{Art}	George Balanchine	5 February 1964	
92	17	"The Bitter Weird"	Eric Till ^{TV} Arnold Spohr ^{Art}	Agnes de Mille; Music by : Trude Rittmann	5 February 1964	
93	18	"Young Canadians in Concert"	Unknown	Unknown	19 February 1964	
94	19	"Uncle Vanya"	David Gardner	Anton Chekhov	26 February 1964	
95	20	"Invitation to Place des Arts"	Unknown	Richard Strauss	4 March 1964	
96	21	"The Firebugs"	Unknown	Play by : Max Frisch; Translated by : Mordecai Gorelik; Adapted by : John Bethune	11 March 1964	
97	22	"Twelfth Night"	George McCowan	Play by : William Shakespeare; Adapted by : Robert Allen	8 April 1964	
98	23	"Hamlet at Elsinore"	Philip Saville	William Shakespeare	15 April 1964	
99	24	"Triple Play"	Norman Campbell	Music by : Strauss II & J. Strauss · Traditionals; Choreography by : Ray Powell; Jazz by : Phil Nimmons	6 May 1964	
100	25	"The Private Memoirs and Confessions of a Justified Sinner"	Eric Till	Story by : James Hogg; Teleplay by : Alvin Goldman	13 May 1964	
101	26	"Concerti for Four Wednesdays"	Vincent Tovell	Beethoven · Sweelinck · Bach · Webern	3 June 1964	
102	27	"A Festival of Miniatures"	Unknown	Unknown	10 June 1964	
103	28	"Claudio Arrau Concert"	Unknown	Wolfgang Amadeus Mozart · Ludwig van Beethoven	17 June 1964	
104	29	"100th Birthday of Richard Strauss"	Franz Kraemer	Unknown	24 June 1964	

=== Season 5 (1964–65) ===
Notes:

- Three episodes from season four reaired this season; "Roots" on 21 October 1964, "A Very Close Family" on 24 February 1965, and "Pale Horse, Pale Rider" on 17 March 1965.
- Weeks pre-empted by other programming, including; Intertel on 23 December 1964, Hallmark Hall of Fame on 27 January 1965, NHL hockey on 10 March 1965, Camera Canada on 16 June 1965, and a special on China called The 700 Million on 4 November 1964 and its repeat airing on 30 December 1964.
- The Festival time-slot was also filled for special productions:
  - On 13 January 1965, Festival aired the National Film Board of Canada one-hour documentary Bethune produced by Donald Brittain and John Kemeny, which had debuted earlier in November 1964 at the Leipzig International Festival in East Germany.
  - On 17 February 1965, the Cariboo Country episode "The Education of Phyllistine" aired on Festival after its screening at the Montreal International Film Festival (August 7th-13th 1964). The one-hour episode was edited together from two half-hour shows, and won a Canadian Film Award.
  - On 14 April 1965, Claude Jutra's 1963 film À tout prendre aired on Festival.

No. overall	No. in season	Title	Directed by	Written by	Original release date	Ref.
105	1	"The Feast of Lupercal"	George McCowan	Novel by : Brian Moore; Adapted by : Fletcher Markle	7 October 1964	
106	2	"Mrs. Daily Has a Lover"	Harvey Hart	Teleplay by : William Hanley	14 October 1964	
106	2	"Today is Independence Day"	Harvey Hart	Teleplay by : William Hanley	14 October 1964	
107	3	"Premiere"	Franz Kraemer	Brahms · Ravel · Handel · Rossini · Nin	28 October 1964	
107	3	"Premiere"	Eric Till	Music by : Prokofiev · Tranchell; Choreography by : Kenneth MacMillan	28 October 1964	
108	4	"The Close Prisoner"	Paul Almond	Play by : Clive Exton; Teleplay by : Alice Sinclair	11 November 1964	
109	5	"The Master Builder"	Eric Till	Play by : Henrik Ibsen; Adapted by : Peter Donat; Music by : Gustav Holst	18 November 1964	
110	6	"Gala of Favourites"	Unknown	Music by : Sergei Rachmaninoff · Léo Delibes; Opera by : Giacomo Puccini; Choreography by : Michel Conte	25 November 1964	
111	7	"Waiting for Godot"	George Bloomfield	Samuel Beckett	2 December 1964	
112	8	"Masters from Soviet Russia"	Unknown	Antonio Vivaldi · Johann Sebastian Bach	9 December 1964	
113	9	"The Magician of Lublin"	George Bloomfield	Novel by : Isaac Bashevis Singer; Adapted by : Alvin Goldman	16 December 1964	
114	10	"The Birthday Party"	Paul Almond	Harold Pinter	6 January 1965	
115	11	"Mother Courage"	George McCowan	Play by : Bertolt Brecht; Translated by : Eric Bentley	20 January 1965	
116	12	"Rigoletto"	Unknown	Opera by : Giuseppe Verdi; Choreography by : Alan Lund	3 February 1965	
117	13	"The Furious Philipp Hotz, Ph.D."	Peter Boretski	Max Frisch	10 February 1965	
117	13	"Epiphany"	Michael Sinelnikoff	Lewis John Carlino	10 February 1965	
118	14	"The Duke"	Paddy Sampson	Music by : Duke Ellington	3 March 1965	
119	15	"Two Terrible Women"	Mario Prizek	Play by : André Laurendeau; Translated by : Gwethalyn Graham	24 March 1965	
120	16	"Concert Italian Style"	Unknown	Puccini · Rossini · Tosti · Mascagni	31 March 1965	
121	17	"Cine Boom"	Robert Russel, Claude Jutra	Unknown	7 April 1965	
122	18	"Let Me Count the Ways"	Paul Almond	Charles Israel	21 April 1965	
123	19	"Iolanthe"	Norman Campbell	Gilbert and Sullivan	28 April 1965	
124	20	"Say Nothing"	Peter Boretski	Play by : James Hanley; Adapted by : William Emms	5 May 1965	
125	21	"A Spring Song in Six Scenes"	Paul Almond	Ray Mathew	12 May 1965	
126	22	"Bernard Shaw: Who the Devil Was He?"	Vincent Tovell	Autobiography by : George Bernard Shaw; Teleplay by : Lister Sinclair	19 May 1965	
127	23	"The Season of Love"	Unknown	Unknown	26 May 1965	
128	24	"Balanchine - In Praise of Great Performers"	Pierre Morin	Music by : Paul Hindemith · Charles Ives; Choreography by : George Balanchine	2 June 1965	
129	25	"Meet Seiji Ozawa - In Praise of Great Performers"	Unknown	Hector Berlioz	9 June 1965	
130	26	"Music In Camera - In Praise of Great Performers"	Vincent Tovell	Ludwig van Beethoven · Johannes Brahms	23 June 1965	
131	27	"Ricter and Forrester - In Praise of Great Performers"	Unknown	Schubert · Brahms · Ravel · Prokofiev	30 June 1965	

=== Season 6 (1965–66) ===
Notes:

- Three episodes were season five reruns; "Let Me Count the Ways" on 10 November 1965, "Ricter and Forrester - In Praise of Great Performers" on 22 June 1966, and "Music In Camera - In Praise of Great Performers" on 29 June 1966.
- Two season six episodes aired twice; "Romeo and Juliet" on 2 March 1966, and "Heritage" on 9 February 1966.
- Other weeks were pre-empted by other programming; pro football on 17 November 1965; an NFB documentary, "Buy Low, Sell High" on 27 April 1966; The Bob Hope Vietnam Christmas Show and an episode of Cariboo Country called "How to Break a Quarterhorse" on 19 January 1966; a re-broadcast of the NFB documentary Bethune on 9 February 1966; and on 16 March 1966, the NFB documentary Memorandum (1965) with the 1963 short film La contrebasse ("Contre Basse") directed by Maurice Fasquel, which he adapted from Anton Chekhov's short story Roman s kontrabasom. Fasquel's film won an award at the San Sebastián International Film Festival.
- Festival also had short presentations that followed programing by other corporations and producers:
  - The week of 8 December 1965 the Festival time-slot was used to air the 75-minute BBC film Culloden originally broadcast on 14 December 1964. The remaining 15 minutes of air-time (totaling 90 minutes) was filled with a song recital by Montreal singer Monique Leyrac who had won the top award at an international song festival in Sopot, Poland that summer. These two segments were rerun the week of 13 April 1966.
  - The week of 16 February 1966 the first hour of Festival aired the NFB 44-minute documentary Ladies and Gentlemen... Mr. Leonard Cohen produced by John Kemeny, followed by the half-hour Festival episode, "The Scotch".

No. overall	No. in season	Title	Directed by	Written by	Original release date	Ref.
132	1	"Romeo and Juliet"	Norman Campbell ^{TV} Celia Franca ^{Art}	Play by : William Shakespeare; Music by : Sergei Prokofiev; Choreography by : John Cranko	15 September 1965	
133	2	"A Cheap Bunch of Nice Flowers"	George Bloomfield	Play by : Edna O'Brien; Adapted by : Alvin Goldman	22 September 1965	
134	3	"A Game – Like – Only a Game"	Eric Till	John Hopkins	29 September 1965	
135	4	"Romeo and Jeannette"	Paul Almond	Play by : Jean Anouilh; Translated by : Miriam John	6 October 1965	
136	5	"Horror of Darkness"	Paul Almond	John Hopkins	13 October 1965	
137	6	"Summer of the Seventeenth Doll"	Peter Boretski	Ray Lawler	20 October 1965	
138	7	"Double Bill: Karl Böhm and Jon Vickers"	Unknown	Mozart · Beethoven · Wagner	27 October 1965	
138	7	"Childhood"	Curt Reis	Thornton Wilder	27 October 1965	
139	8	"The Barber of Seville"	Unknown	Gioachino Rossini	3 November 1965	
140	9	"Romance in Music"	Unknown	Schubert · Tchaikovsky · Liszt; Choreography by : George Balanchine	24 November 1965	
140	9	"Heloise and Abelard"	George Bloomfield	Play by : James Forsyth; Adapted by : George Bloomfield	24 November 1965	
141	10	"Silent Night, Lonely Night"	Eric Till	Robert Anderson	1 December 1965	
142	11	"Juno and the Paycock"	Peter Boretski	Seán O'Casey	15 December 1965	
143	12	"The Songs of Man"	Paddy Sampson	Traditionals; Teleplay by : Martin Lavut, Stan Daniels	22 December 1965	
143	12	"Whisper Into My Good Ear"	Mervyn Rosenzveig	William Hanley	22 December 1965	
143	12	"The Ages of Man"	David Susskind	William Shakespeare	22 December 1965	
144	13	"No Two People"	Norman Campbell	Stan Daniels	29 December 1965	
145	14	"An Ideal Husband"	Mario Prizek	Oscar Wilde	5 January 1966	
146	15	"Introducing Michel Legrand"	Unknown	Michel Legrand	12 January 1966	
146	15	"Heritage"	Leo Orenstein	Poem by : Countee Cullen; Music by : Moe Koffman; Choreography by : Charlotte De Neve; Adaptation by : Leo Orenstein	12 January 1966	
147	16	"The Just"	Peter Boretski	Play by : Albert Camus; Adapted by : Bernard Frechtman	26 January 1966	
148	17	"Ashes to Ashes"	Eric Till	Teleplay by : Marc Brandel	2 February 1966	
149	18	"The Scotch"	Mervyn Rosenzveig	Memoir by : John Kenneth Galbraith	16 February 1966	
150	19	"The Blues"	Paddy Sampson	Music by : Blues artists	23 February 1966	
150	19	"The Murderer"	Paul Almond	Written by : Fyodor Dostoevsky; Teleplay by : George Salverson	23 February 1966	
151	20	"Stravinsky"	Roman Kroiter, Wolf Koenig	Unknown	9 March 1966	
151	20	"The Violinist"	Unknown	Unknown	9 March 1966	
151	20	"Richard Burton"	John Ormond	Unknown	9 March 1966	
152	21	"The Magic Flute"	Franz Kraemer	Opera by : Mozart; Libretto by : Emanuel Schikaneder, Carl Ludwig Giesecke; English v. by : Ruth and Thomas Martin, Edward J. Dent; Choreography by : Don Gillies	23 March 1966	
153	22	"Man Alive"	George Bloomfield	George Ryga	30 March 1966	
154	23	"Bernard Shaw: Who the Devil Was He?"	Vincent Tovell	Autobiography by : George Bernard Shaw; Teleplay by : Lister Sinclair	19 May 1965	
154	23	"Arms and the Man"	Leon Major	George Bernard Shaw	6 April 1966	
155	24	"The Exquisite Twenties"	Franz Kraemer	Ravel · Stravinsky · Gershwin · Lehár	20 April 1966	
155	24	"Dylan Revisited"	Paul Almond	Poetry by : Dylan Thomas; Adapted by : Paul Almond	20 April 1966	
156	25	"A Doll's House"	Paul Almond	Play by : Henrik Ibsen; Adapted by : Fletcher Markle	4 May 1966	
157	26	"Victor Borge"	Paddy Sampson	Rachmaninoff · Liszt · Sarasate · P. D. Q. Bach	11 May 1966	
158	27	"Duo: Glenn Gould, Yehudi Menuhin"	Unknown	Schoenberg · Bach · Beethoven	18 May 1966	
159	28	"Loving"	Unknown	Opera by : Murray Schafer	25 May 1966	
160	29	"Point and Counterpoint"	Unknown	Johann Sebastian Bach	1 June 1966	
161	30	"CBC Talent Festival (Massey Hall)"	Unknown	Unknown	8 June 1966	
162	31	"CBC Talent Festival (Place des Arts)"	Unknown	Mozart · Édouard Lalo · Puccini · Charpentier · Kent Kennan	15 June 1966	
163	32	"Concert: Soiree Musicale"	Unknown	Robert Schumann · Felix Mendelssohn	6 July 1966	

=== Season 7 (1966–67) ===
Notes:

- Festival reruns include "Contre Basse" on 3 May 1967, "Silent Night, Lonely Night" on 14 December 1966 "No Two People" on 21 December 1966, "Heloise and Abelard" on 2 November 1966, "Spirit of the Deed" on 18 January 1967, and "Fifteen Miles of Broken Glass" on 22 February 1967.
- For three weeks Music Canada aired in Festival's time-slot, on 7 December 1966, 4 January 1967, and 12 April 1967.
- Other programming that pre-empted Festival include the Hallmark Hall of Fame specials, "Blithe Spirit" on 23 November 1966, and "Anastasia" on 1 February 1967, Intertel on 7 December 1966 and 14 December 1966, and Bob Hope on 18 January 1967.
- Special programming that pre-empted Festival includes a News Special re-broadcast of the funeral procession of late Governor General of Canada, Georges Vanier on 8 March 1967, the Centennial Performance on 19 April 1967, and the NFB documentary The Things I Cannot Change on 3 May 1967.
- For the week of 16 November 1966, Festival aired the 90-minute documentary The Golden Ring (1965), a United Kingdom BBC production released on 16 May 1965, about the making of the Götterdämmerung ("Twilight of the Gods") recording, the last of the four epic music dramas from Richard Wagner's cycle Der Ring des Nibelungen ("The Ring of the Nibelung").
- For the week of 21 December 1966, Festival commissioned the drama special "How to Break a Quarter Horse" for the upcoming 1967 Canadian Centennial. The episode was developed from the anthology series Cariboo Country.
- The week of 5 April 1967, Festival aired the BBC production of Cathy Come Home which originally aired on The Wednesday Play on 16 November 1966.

No. overall	No. in season	Title	Directed by	Written by	Original release date	Ref.
164	1	"Miss Julie"	Eric Till	Play by : August Strindberg; Translated by : Elizabeth Spriggs; Adapted by : Robert Huber	14 September 1966	
165	2	"Fifteen Miles of Broken Glass"	John Hirsch	Tom Hendry	21 September 1966	
166	3	"Mary of Scotland"	Peter Boretski	Play by : Maxwell Anderson; Adapted by : Mavor Moore	28 September 1966	
167	4	"David, Chapter III"	Harvey Hart	M. Charles Cohen	5 October 1966	
168	5	"Westbrook's Man"	Rudi Dorn	Herb Hosie	12 October 1966	
168	5	"Ligging About"	Unknown	Paul McDowell	12 October 1966	
169	6	"Thomas' Elegy"	Mervyn Rosenzveig	Enid Abrahams	19 October 1966	
170	7	"Spirit of the Deed"	David Gardner	Based on : "The Third Person"; Short story by : Henry James; Written by : Michael Sinelnikoff	26 October 1966	
170	7	"You Can Always Learn Something from a Lady"	Unknown	Willie "the Lion" Smith	26 October 1966	
171	8	"New Bottles, New Wine"	Ron Kelly	Enid Abrahams	9 November 1966	
172	9	"My Lost Saints"	Tad Mosel	Curt Reis	30 November 1966	
172	9	"Brecht: A Threepenny Profile"	Mario Prizek	Antony Ferry	30 November 1966	
173	10	"The Blues"	Paddy Sampson	Music by : Blues artists Researched by : Martin Lavut; Teleplay by : Barry Callaghan	28 December 1966	
174	11	"The Taming of the Shrew"	Mario Prizek	Play by : William Shakespeare; Adapted by : John Bethune	11 January 1967	
175	12	"Teresa Stratas 1967"	Unknown	Mozart · Tchaikovsky · Verdi · Jacques Offenbach	25 January 1967	
176	13	"Yerma"	Leo Orenstein	Play by : Federico García Lorca; Adapted by : Alvin Goldman	8 February 1967	
177	14	"The Devil Makes Three"	Mario Prizek	Marc Brandel	15 February 1967	
178	15	"The Puppet Caravan"	Paul Almond	Story by : Marie-Claire Blais; Adapted by : Mavor Moore	1 March 1967	
178	15	"The Fifth-Floor People"	Mervyn Rosenzveig	Stanley Mann	1 March 1967	
179	16	"Enoch Soames"	Melwyn Breen	Short story by : Max Beerbohm; Adapted by : Mavor Moore	15 March 1967	
180	17	"Variations"	Rudi Dorn	Rudi Dorn	22 March 1967	
181	18	"To Every Man His Bach"	Unknown	Unknown	29 March 1967	
181	18	"Access"	Unknown	Unknown	29 March 1967	
182	19	"The True Bleeding Heart of Martin B."	George Bloomfield	M. Charles Cohen	26 April 1967	
183	20	"Lady Windermere's Fan"	Mario Prizek	Play by : Oscar Wilde; Adapted by : John Bethune	10 May 1967	

=== Season 8 (1967–68) ===
Notes:

- Two Centennial Performance episodes pre-empted new Festival episodes on 4 October 1967 and 15 November 1967, and the NFB Centennial film The Ernie Game aired on 8 November 1967.
- Other programs that pre-empted Festival include, pro football on 22 November 1967, The Strange Case of Dr. Jekyll and Mr. Hyde (1968) on 3 January 1968, The Music Man (1962) on 31 January 1968, the BBC film "The Matador" on 7 February 1968, the BBC documentary Soldiers of the Widow (1967) on 21 February 1968, Mission: Impossible on 20 March 1968, the 1967 Quentin Durgens, M.P. episode "The Road to Chaldaea" on 27 March 1968, Intertel on 17 April 1968, and Stanley Cup hockey on 1 May 1968.
- Special programs that pre-empted Festival include, Film Makers and With Love, Sophia on 25 October 1967, the 60-minute documentary The Secret Years of Eldorado about Canadian participation in the nuclear age on 10 January 1968, the Newsmagazine episode "The Secrets War" on 6 March 1968, live coverage of the Liberal Party Convention on 3 April 1968, and live coverage of the Oscar Awards on 10 April 1968.
- The week of 24 January 1968, the American Hallmark Hall of Fame television film Elizabeth the Queen (1968) aired on Festival starring Judith Anderson, and Charlton Heston.
- For the week of 24 January 1968, Festival had procured and aired Giuseppe Verdi: Messa da Requiem (1967). Directed by French film-maker Henri-Georges Clouzot, it is a performance of Verdi's Requiem Mass with Herbert von Karajan conducting the Chorus and Orchestra of La Scala, Milan. The soloists are soprano Leontyne Price, mezzo-soprano Fiorenza Cossotto, tenor Luciano Pavarotti, and basso Nicolai Ghiaurov.

No. overall	No. in season	Title	Directed by	Written by	Original release date	Ref.
184	1	"Tea Party"	Eric Till	Harold Pinter	11 October 1967	
185	2	"Slow Dance on the Killing Ground"	Melwyn Breen	William Hanley	18 October 1967	
186	3	"Byron Janis plays Prokofiev"	Unknown	Sergei Prokofiev	1 November 1967	
187	4	"Waiting for Caroline"	Ron Kelly	George C. Robertson, Ron Kelly	29 November 1967	
188	5	"Four in Concert"	Unknown	Unknown	6 December 1967	
189	6	"The Paper People"	David Gardner	Timothy Findley	13 December 1967	
190	7	"Frost at Midnight"	Norman Campbell	Play by : André Obey; Translated by : Warren Tute; Adapted by : Charles E. Israel	20 December 1967	
191	8	"Swan Lake"	Norman Campbell	Music by : Pyotr Ilyich Tchaikovsky; Choreography by : Erik Bruhn	27 December 1967	
192	9	"The Best of All Possible Worlds"	Unknown	Novella by : Voltaire; Musical adaptation by : Mavor Moore	17 January 1968	
192	9	"The Painted Door"	Rudi Dorn	Story by : Sinclair Ross; Adapted by : Alvin Goldman	17 January 1968	
193	10	"The Art of Rostropovich"	Unknown	Shostakovich · Haydn · Tchaikovsky	14 February 1968	
194	11	"East-West Concerto"	Unknown	Tōru Takemitsu · György Ligeti · Gustav Mahler	28 February 1968	
195	12	"The Dolly Scene"	Mervyn Rosenzveig	John Hopkins	24 April 1968	
196	13	"Trumpets of the Lord"	Norman Campbell ^{TV} Howard Roberts ^{Mus}	Written by : James Weldon Johnson; Choreography by : Donald McKayle	8 May 1968	

=== Season 9 (1968–69) ===
Notes:

- "Traveller Without Luggage" from season two was rerun on 26 February 1969.
- Programs which pre-empted Festival include Bob Hope and Public Eye on 27 November 1968, and Christmas specials on 25 December 1968.
- Special programming that aired in the Festival time-slot follows.
  - The 1966 BBC production of Benjamin Britten's opera Billy Budd, based on the 1891 novel by Herman Melville, aired on 20 November 1968 from 8:00 to 10:45 PM.
  - "Edmonton Contest" on 4 December 1968 was a CBC-TV music special hosted by Brian Priestman, with five finalists of the National Performing Artists Competition, organized by the Edmonton Symphony Orchestra.
  - "Sir Ernest Laudamus" / "Enest MacMillan: A Musical Tribute" was a concert held on 20 November at Massey Hall with the Toronto Mendelssohn Choir, Festival Singers of Canada and Toronto Symphony Orchestra conducted by Elmer Iseler, and aired on 18 December 1968.
  - Public Eye aired at 9 PM (1 hour) and a Music Special (10 PM) featuring Canada's National Youth Orchestra, with musicians 14-24 years-old, presented its first television concert, with Franz-Paul Decker conducting 108 musicians, on 8 January 1969.
- Three drama specials developed from the anthology series Cariboo Country, and aired on Festival, including Sister Balonika which was broadcast on 26 March 1969. It was written by Paul St. Pierre, directed by Philip Keatley and filmed on-location in Richmond, and at Hollyburn Film Studios, West Vancouver. It starred Vi Powlan in the lead role as Sister Veronica Anne, whom her students called "Bolanika." Cast included, Christine Green, Merv Campone, Nan Sandy, Susan Ringwood, Lloyd Berry, Jimmy Edwards, Ivor Harries, Diane Wassman, and Robert Clothier.

No. overall	No. in season	Title	Directed by	Written by	Original release date	Ref.
197	1	"The Write-Off"	Rudi Dorn	George Salverson	30 October 1968	
198	2	"Yesterday the Children were Dancing"	Unknown	Play by : Gratien Gélinas; Translated by : Mavor Moore	6 November 1968	
199	3	"A Scent of Flowers"	Unknown	James Saunders	13 November 1968	
200	4	"Reddick"	Mervyn Rosenzveig	Munroe Scott	11 December 1968	
201	5	"A Penny for a Song"	Norman Campbell	Play by : John Whiting; Adapted by : Fletcher Markle	1 January 1969	
202	6	"Neighbours"	George Bloomfield	James Saunders	15 January 1969	
202	6	"The Basement"	George Bloomfield	Harold Pinter	15 January 1969	
203	7	"The Jazz Piano"	Unknown	Unknown	22 January 1969	
204	8	"Noises of Paradise"	Rudi Dorn	Written by : Charles E. Israel; Story by : Seymour Epstein	29 January 1969	
205	9	"Karel Ančerl with Toronto Symphony"	Unknown	Bedřich Smetana	5 February 1969	
206	10	"Joan Sutherland in Concert"	Unknown	Bizet · Handel · Bononcini · Bellini · Rossini · Delibes	12 February 1969	
207	11	"The Journey of the Fifth Horse"	Unknown	Novella by : Ivan Turgenev; Play by : Ronald Ribman; Adapted by : Melwyn Breen	19 February 1969	
208	12	"Carmina Burana"	Jean-Yves Landry	Cantata by : Carl Orff; Choreography by : George Skibine	5 March 1969	
209	13	"That Summer, That Fall"	Mario Prizek	Frank D. Gilroy	12 March 1969	
210	14	"The Three Musketeers"	John Hirsch	Novel by : Alexandre Dumas; Adapted by : Peter Raby	19 March 1969	
