= Festival (Canadian TV series) season 8 =

Festival
- Season 8
- No. of episodes: 13

Release
- Original network: CBC
- Original release: 4 October 1967 – 8 May 1968

Season chronology
- ← Previous; Season 7 Next → Season 9

The eighth season of the Canadian television anthology series Festival broadcast on CBC Television from 4 October 1967 to 8 May 1968. Thirteen new episodes aired this season, along with several non-CBC productions such as Giuseppe Verdi: Messa da Requiem (1967) by French film-maker Henri-Georges Clouzot, and Elizabeth the Queen by Hallmark Hall of Fame. The season finale is Trumpets of the Lord, a joint Canadian CBC and American NET production which aired first on Festival then on NET Playhouse two days later.

== Synopsis ==
Plays and adaptations include John Hopkins' play The Dolly Scene, Sinclair Ross' atmospheric drama The Painted Door adapted by Alvin Goldman, William Hanley's play Slow Dance on the Killing Ground, and André Obey's Christmas play Les trois coups de minuit (1957), translated as Frost at Midnight by Warren Tute. Harold Pinter's 1963 short story Tea Party was adapted as a play for television in 1965, and presented on Festival this season. The Best of All Possible Worlds is Mavor Moore's musical adaptation of Voltaire's satirical novella Candide (1759).

Two films were produced this season. Waiting for Caroline written by George C. Robertson and Ron Kelly, is the first feature film co-produced by the Canadian Broadcasting Corporation and the National Film Board of Canada, and débuted on Festival before its theater release. Timothy Findley's film The Paper People is the first television film produced entirely in-house by CBC Television without an outside coproducer.

Music this season includes American pianist Byron Janis playing Prokofiev with the Toronto Symphony Orchestra (TSO) conducted by Seiji Ozawa, and selections by American coloratura soprano Reri Grist, pianist Anton Kuerti, and oboist Harold Gomberg of the New York Philharmonic Orchestra. Ozawa and the TSO also present an East-West mix of traditional Japanese music and classical, featuring works by Tōru Takemitsu, György Ligeti, and Gustav Mahler. Music Director George Crum conducts as the National Ballet of Canada performs a newly choreographed version of Tchaikovsky's ballet Swan Lake by Erik Bruhn. Dancers include Bruhn, Canadian ballerina Lois Smith, Joysanne Sidimus, Celia Franca, Vanessa Harwood, Lawrence Adams, and Veronica Tennant. At Massey Hall Toronto, Russian cellist Mstislav Rostropovich plays Dmitri Shostakovich's new Concerto No. 2, and the recently rediscovered Haydn C Major Cello Concerto No. 1. Rostropovich's wife, Bolshoi Opera soprano Galina Vishnevskaya sings songs by Tchaikovsky in Russian to Rostropovich's piano accompaniment, recorded at Expo '67, the World's Fair in Montreal.

== Notable guest cast ==
- Sharon Acker
- Lawrence Adams
- Carl Banas
- Victor Braun
- Erik Bruhn
- Dinah Christie
- Jack Creley
- George Crum
- Peter Donat
- Celia Franca
- Howell Glynne
- Harold Gomberg
- Reri Grist
- Vanessa Harwood
- Eric House
- Byron Janis
- Anton Kuerti
- Michael Learned
- Marilyn Lightstone
- Monique Mercure
- William Needles
- Seiji Ozawa
- Gerard Parkes
- Jennifer Phipps
- Kate Reid
- Mstislav Rostropovich
- Joysanne Sidimus
- Lois Smith
- Brett Somers
- Alexandra Stewart
- Marc Strange
- Veronica Tennant
- Kinshi Tsuruta
- Tony Van Bridge
- Galina Vishnevskaya
- Robin Ward
- Lucy Warner
- Hugh Webster
- Billy Dee Williams
- Frank Williams
- Katsuya Yokoyama

== Episodes ==
Notes:

- Two Centennial Performance episodes pre-empted new Festival episodes on 4 October 1967 and 15 November 1967, and the NFB Centennial film The Ernie Game aired on 8 November 1967.
- Other programs that pre-empted Festival include, pro football on 22 November 1967, The Strange Case of Dr. Jekyll and Mr. Hyde (1968) on 3 January 1968, The Music Man (1962) on 31 January 1968, the BBC film "The Matador" on 7 February 1968, the BBC documentary Soldiers of the Widow (1967) on 21 February 1968, Mission: Impossible on 20 March 1968, the 1967 Quentin Durgens, M.P. episode "The Road to Chaldaea" on 27 March 1968, Intertel on 17 April 1968, and Stanley Cup hockey on 1 May 1968.
- Special programs that pre-empted Festival include, Film Makers and With Love, Sophia on 25 October 1967, the 60-minute documentary The Secret Years of Eldorado about Canadian participation in the nuclear age on 10 January 1968, the Newsmagazine episode "The Secrets War" on 6 March 1968, live coverage of the Liberal Party Convention on 3 April 1968, and live coverage of the Oscar Awards on 10 April 1968.
- The week of 24 January 1968, the American Hallmark Hall of Fame television film Elizabeth the Queen (1968) aired on Festival starring Judith Anderson, and Charlton Heston.
- For the week of 24 January 1968, Festival had procured and aired Giuseppe Verdi: Messa da Requiem (1967). Directed by French film-maker Henri-Georges Clouzot, it is a performance of Verdi's Requiem Mass with Herbert von Karajan conducting the Chorus and Orchestra of La Scala, Milan. The soloists are soprano Leontyne Price, mezzo-soprano Fiorenza Cossotto, tenor Luciano Pavarotti, and basso Nicolai Ghiaurov.

No. overall	No. in season	Title	Directed by	Written by	Original release date	Ref.
184	1	"Tea Party"	Eric Till	Harold Pinter	11 October 1967	
Please add a Plot Summary here, replacing this text. For guidance, see How to write a plot summary. Episode summaries must be expressed in your own words. Do NOT submit content you find from another web site as it is plagiarism and likely a copyright violation, which Wikipedia cannot accept and will be removed or reverted. Superficially modifying copyrighted content or closely paraphrasing it, even if the source is cited, still constitutes a copyright violation. As per Television Plot Manual of Style,^{MOS:TVPLOT} summaries should be about 100 to 200 words in length, and those substantially less than 100 words are most likely to be scrutinized for possible copyright violation. Cast: Pat Galloway, Charles Palmer, Lillian Graham, Steve Barringer and Alex Barringer. Notes: Executive producer Robert Allen introduces upcoming dramas, and clips from Slow Dance on the Killing Ground.
185	2	"Slow Dance on the Killing Ground"	Melwyn Breen	William Hanley	18 October 1967	
186	3	"Byron Janis plays Prokofiev"	Unknown	Sergei Prokofiev	1 November 1967	
American piano virtuoso Byron Janis plays Piano Concerto No. 3 in C Major, Op. 26 by Sergei Prokofiev along with the Toronto Symphony Orchestra conducted by Seiji Ozawa. Notes: Produced by Franz Kraemer. Duration, 30 minutes. Preceded by the NFB drama Notes for a Film About Donna and Gail (1966).
187	4	"Waiting for Caroline"	Ron Kelly	George C. Robertson, Ron Kelly	29 November 1967	
Waiting for Caroline is the first feature film co-produced by the CBC and the National Film Board of Canada, and débuted on Festival, after which it was released for theater distribution.
188	5	"Four in Concert"	Unknown	Unknown	6 December 1967	
Four concert stars are featured in this hour of music; American coloratura soprano Reri Grist of New York City, pianist Anton Kuerti in residence at the University of Toronto, oboist Harold Gomberg a celebrated soloist with the New York Philharmonic Orchestra, and Seiji Ozawa conducting the Toronto Symphony Orchestra. Production personnel: Franz Kraemer, Vincent Tovell.
189	6	"The Paper People"	David Gardner	Timothy Findley	13 December 1967	
190	7	"Frost at Midnight"	Norman Campbell	Play by : André Obey; Translated by : Warren Tute; Adapted by : Charles E. Israel	20 December 1967	
191	8	"Swan Lake"	Norman Campbell	Music by : Pyotr Ilyich Tchaikovsky; Choreography by : Erik Bruhn	27 December 1967	
George Crum conducts the orchestra as the National Ballet of Canada performs Pyotr Ilyich Tchaikovsky's classic ballet Swan Lake, choreographed by Erik Bruhn. Bruhn portrays the Prince with Canadian ballerina Lois Smith as the Swan Queen and Black Swan, Olga Makcheeva as the Queen Mother, Joysanne Sidimus as the Prince's Friend, co-founder of the National Ballet of Canada Celia Franca as the Black Queen, Yves Cousineau as the Tutor, Hazaros Surmejan as the Master of Ceremonies, and Leeyan Granger, Vanessa Harwood, Elizabeth Keeble and Charmaine Turner as Swan Princesses. Additional performers include, Karen Bowes, Barbara Sherval, Glenn Gilmour, and Gunther Pick in the Spanish Dance, Kristina Sealander and Lawrence Adams in the Czardas Dance, and Veronica Tennant and Jeremy Blanton perform in the Neapolitan Dance.
192	9	"The Best of All Possible Worlds"	Unknown	Novella by : Voltaire; Musical adaptation by : Mavor Moore	17 January 1968	
192	9	"The Painted Door"	Rudi Dorn	Story by : Sinclair Ross; Adapted by : Alvin Goldman	17 January 1968	
Part 1 (60 minutes). The Best of All Possible Worlds: Please add a Plot Summary here, replacing this text. For guidance, see How to write a plot summary and the Television Plot Manual of Style.^{MOS:TVPLOT} Subject: Musical adaptation of Voltaire's satirical novella Candide. Cast: Edward Evanko (Candide), Barbara Shuttleworth (Cunegonde), Jack Creley, Dinah Christie, Howell Glynne, Eric House, Joseph Shaw, Nicholas Simons, and Kenneth Pogue. Production personnel: John Barnes, Norman Campbell. Part 2 (30 minutes). The Painted Door: Please add a Plot Summary here, replacing this text. For guidance, see How to write a plot summary and the Television Plot Manual of Style.^{MOS:TVPLOT} Cast: Nicholas Simons, Gwen Thomas, and Carl Banas.
193	10	"The Art of Rostropovich"	Unknown	Shostakovich · Haydn · Tchaikovsky	14 February 1968	
Russian cellist Mstislav Rostropovich plays Dmitri Shostakovich's new Opus 26, Concerto No. 2, and the recently rediscovered Cello Concerto No. 1 in C Major by one of his favourite composers, Joseph Haydn. He is accompanied by the Toronto Symphony Orchestra conducted by Seiji Ozawa, and performs before an audience at Massey Hall Toronto. Also featured is Rostropovich's wife, Bolshoi Opera soprano Galina Vishnevskaya singing in Russian, songs by Pyotr Ilyich Tchaikovsky, including Don't Believe, My Love, None But the Lonely Heart (song of Mignon), In the Midst of the Ball, Serenade, and If I'd Only Known. She is accompanied by Rostropovich on piano; recorded at the International Broadcast Centre at the Expo 67 World's Fair in Montreal. Production personnel: Franz Kraemer, Ann Sutton, Ed Krummins.
194	11	"East-West Concerto"	Unknown	Tōru Takemitsu · György Ligeti · Gustav Mahler	28 February 1968	
The Toronto Symphony Orchestra conducted by Seiji Ozawa presents an unusual hour combination of western classical and traditional Japanese music featuring works by Tōru Takemitsu, one of Japan's leading composers. The main performance is Takemitsu's November Steps with shakuhachi soloist Katsuya Yokoyama and biwa soloist Kinshi Tsuruta. Performances also include Atmosphere by György Ligeti, Songs of a Wayfarer Lieder eines fahrenden Gesellen by Gustav Mahler with baritone Victor Braun, and a Japanese traditional song, Elegy with Yokoyama. Production personnel: Robert Allen, John Coulson, Rudi Dorn.
195	12	"The Dolly Scene"	Mervyn Rosenzveig	John Hopkins	24 April 1968	
196	13	"Trumpets of the Lord"	Norman Campbell ^{TV} Howard Roberts ^{Mus}	Written by : James Weldon Johnson; Choreography by : Donald McKayle	8 May 1968	
This ninety-minute show is based on an adaption for the musical stage of James Weldon Johnson's book God's Trombones, a collection of seven sermons in free verse from African-American folklore. It became an off-Broadway hit in 1963-64, and represented the American theater at the 1967 Théâtre des Nations festival in Paris. Set in backwoods churches of the deep South, it blends the singing of African-American spirituals with poetic sermons, featuring James Earl Jones as Reverend Ridgley Washington, Theresa Merritt as Sister Henrietta Pinkston, and Jane White as Reverend Mary Alexander, Earl Baker, William Glover, Bernice Hall, and the company, accompanied by pianist Michael Hinton. Their performances (in alphabetical order) include, Amen, Didn't it Rain, God Be with You, He'll Understand, I Woke Up this Morning, In His Care, In Shady Green Pastures, In that Great Gittin' Up Morning, Prayer is the Key, Reap What You Sow, Run Sinner, Run, So Glad I'm Here, Soon One Morning, There's a Man Goin' Round, We Are Climbing Jacob's Ladder, We are Soldiers, We Shall Not be Moved, and We Shall Overcome. Additional cast: Lex Monson, Milton Grayson, Albertine Robinson, and Billy Stewart. Notes: Produced jointly by Canadian Broadcasting Corporation and National Educational Television and Radio Center, the telecast executive producers are Craig Gilbert (NET), and Robert Allen (CBC). Producers include Theodore Mann, Howard Schwartz, and Will B. Sandler. After its May 8th broadcast on Festival, Trumpets of the Lord was broadcast by the American NET Playhouse on 10 May 1968, and by NET Festival on 29 September 1968.

Previous: Season 7	List of Festival episodes	Succeeded by Season 9
