= Festival (Canadian TV series) season 7 =

Festival
- Season 7
- No. of episodes: 20

Release
- Original network: CBC
- Original release: 14 September 1966 – 10 May 1967

Season chronology
- ← Previous; Season 6 Next → Season 8

The seventh season of the Canadian television anthology series Festival broadcast on CBC Television from 14 September 1966 to 10 May 1967. Twenty new episodes aired this season.

== Synopsis ==
The bulk of season seven presented plays and story adaptations beginning with the premiere, the naturalistic 1888 play Miss Julie written by August Strindberg and translated by Elizabeth Spriggs. John Bethune adapted two plays for television, William Shakespeare's comedy The Taming of the Shrew and Oscar Wilde's satire Lady Windermere's Fan (1892). Mavor Moore adapted three works, Max Beerbohm's short story Enoch Soames (1916), Maxwell Anderson's 1933 Broadway drama Mary of Scotland, and a story by French-Canadian author Marie-Claire Blais, The Puppet Caravan. Ottawa writer Enid Abrahams' television drama Thomas' Elegy aired, as did his play, New Bottles, New Wine. Two plays by M. Charles Cohen were performed; his sequel David, Chapter III, and The True Bleeding Heart of Martin B. Michael Sinelnikoff's drama Spirit of the Deed is based on Henry James' short story The Third Person (1900). Antony Ferry wrote a teleplay about the works of poet-playwright Bertolt Brecht, called Brecht: A Threepenny Profile. Rudi Dorn both wrote and directed Variations, a thirty-minute "fantasy for vision" presented in forty-four scenes with very few lines of dialogue. Canadian playwright Stanley Mann wrote the original drama The Fifth-Floor People. Also presented are Federico García Lorca's tragedy Yerma (1934), Tom Hendry's Fifteen Miles of Broken Glass, Herb Hosie's Westbrook's Man, Tad Mosel's drama play My Lost Saints, and Marc Brandel's thriller The Devil Makes Three.

Paul McDowell bridges comedy skits and sketches with music and songs in a revue hour filmed with an audience.

Season six's hour of "The Blues" hosted by Barry Callaghan is now expanded into ninety minutes of discussion and songs performed by folk/blues guitarist Brownie McGhee, harmonica player Sonny Terry, guitarist/bassist Willie Dixon, Georgia-born one-man band musician Jesse Fuller, singer Mable Hillery, guitarist Booker White, pianist Sunnyland Slim, guitarist Big Joe Williams, and the "father of modern Chicago blues" Muddy Waters and his band, including pianist Otis Spann with James Cotton (harmonica), Samuel Longhorn (guitar), James Madison (guitar), and Jimmy Lee Morris (bass). Jazz king of Harlem "stride" piano, Willie "the Lion" Smith showcases his compositions and discusses music with fellow jazz pianist Don Ewell. A star of the Metropolitan Opera, Canadian soprano Teresa Stratas, performs with baritone Louis Quilico, contralto Patricia Rideout, tenors Robert Jeffrey and Ermanno Mauro, and the Festival Orchestra conducted by Walter Susskind. They perform selections from Mozart's opera The Marriage of Figaro, songs from La Périchole by Jacques Offenbach, and scenes from Tchaikovsky's opera Eugene Onegin (1879) and Verdi's opera La Traviata (1853). Decca classical records producer John Culshaw introduces an hour with the BBC head of music and arts programs, Sir Humphrey Burton, and pianist Glenn Gould, discussing the future of music performance and composition, with Gould playing excerpts from Bach and Beethoven.

== Notable guest cast ==
In addition to individuals cast this season, organizations include the ...

- Sharon Acker
- Archie Alleyne
- Diana Barrington
- Ivor Barry
- Len Birman
- David Buck
- Geneviève Bujold
- Humphrey Burton
- Barry Callaghan
- Robert Christie
- Susan Clark
- Eric Clavering
- Patricia Collins
- James Cotton
- Jack Creley
- John Culshaw
- Lawrence Dane
- Willie Dixon
- Peter Donat
- John Drainie
- Don Ewell
- Ted Follows
- Colin Fox
- Jesse Fuller
- Bruno Gerussi
- Glenn Gould
- Don Harron
- David Hemmings
- Mable Hillery
- Robert Jeffrey
- Terence Kelly
- Charmion King
- Tom Kneebone
- Shirley Knight
- Heath Lamberts
- Martin Lavut
- Cosette Lee
- James Madison
- Jane Mallett
- John Marley
- Ermanno Mauro
- Iréna Mayeska
- Neil McCallum
- Paul McDowell
- Brownie McGhee
- Richard Monette
- David Oxley
- Louis Quilico
- Gerard Parkes
- Jennifer Phipps
- Gordon Pinsent
- Henry Ramer
- Kate Reid
- Mark Richman
- Barbara Shelley
- Sunnyland Slim
- Willie "the Lion" Smith
- Paul Soles
- Michael Snow
- Otis Spann
- Teresa Stratas
- Walter Susskind
- Toby Tarnow
- François Tassé
- Joy Tepperman
- Sonny Terry
- John Vernon
- Muddy Waters
- Hugh Webster
- Sandy Webster
- Booker White
- Paxton Whitehead
- Chris Wiggins
- Big Joe Williams

== Episodes ==
Notes:

- Festival reruns include "Contre Basse" on 3 May 1967, "Silent Night, Lonely Night" on 14 December 1966 "No Two People" on 21 December 1966, "Heloise and Abelard" on 2 November 1966, "Spirit of the Deed" on 18 January 1967, and "Fifteen Miles of Broken Glass" on 22 February 1967.
- For three weeks Music Canada aired in Festival's time-slot, on 7 December 1966, 4 January 1967, and 12 April 1967.
- Other programming that pre-empted Festival include the Hallmark Hall of Fame specials, "Blithe Spirit" on 23 November 1966, and "Anastasia" on 1 February 1967, Intertel on 7 December 1966 and 14 December 1966, and Bob Hope on 18 January 1967.
- Special programming that pre-empted Festival includes a News Special re-broadcast of the funeral procession of late Governor General of Canada, Georges Vanier on 8 March 1967, the Centennial Performance on 19 April 1967, and the NFB documentary The Things I Cannot Change on 3 May 1967.
- For the week of 16 November 1966, Festival aired the 90-minute documentary The Golden Ring (1965), a United Kingdom BBC production released on 16 May 1965, about the making of the Götterdämmerung ("Twilight of the Gods") recording, the last of the four epic music dramas from Richard Wagner's cycle Der Ring des Nibelungen ("The Ring of the Nibelung").
- For the week of 21 December 1966, Festival commissioned the drama special "How to Break a Quarter Horse" for the upcoming 1967 Canadian Centennial. The episode was developed from the anthology series Cariboo Country.
- The week of 5 April 1967, Festival aired the BBC production of Cathy Come Home which originally aired on The Wednesday Play on 16 November 1966.

No. overall	No. in season	Title	Directed by	Written by	Original release date	Ref.
164	1	"Miss Julie"	Eric Till	Play by : August Strindberg; Translated by : Elizabeth Spriggs; Adapted by : Robert Huber	14 September 1966	
Please add a Plot Summary here, replacing this text. For guidance, see How to write a plot summary. Episode summaries must be expressed in your own words. Do NOT submit content you find from another web site as it is plagiarism and likely a copyright violation, which Wikipedia cannot accept and will be removed or reverted. Superficially modifying copyrighted content or closely paraphrasing it, even if the source is cited, still constitutes a copyright violation. As per Television Plot Manual of Style,^{MOS:TVPLOT} summaries should be about 100 to 200 words in length, and those substantially less than 100 words are most likely to be scrutinized for possible copyright violation.
165	2	"Fifteen Miles of Broken Glass"	John Hirsch	Tom Hendry	21 September 1966	
166	3	"Mary of Scotland"	Peter Boretski	Play by : Maxwell Anderson; Adapted by : Mavor Moore	28 September 1966	
167	4	"David, Chapter III"	Harvey Hart	M. Charles Cohen	5 October 1966	
168	5	"Westbrook's Man"	Rudi Dorn	Herb Hosie	12 October 1966	
168	5	"Ligging About"	Unknown	Paul McDowell	12 October 1966	
Part 1 (30 minutes). Westbrook's Man: Please add a Plot Summary here, replacing this text. For guidance, see How to write a plot summary and the Television Plot Manual of Style.^{MOS:TVPLOT} Cast: Robert Christie, John Kastner, Lynn Gorman, and Michele Finney. Part 2 (60 minutes). Ligging About: This revue hour by Paul McDowell and Barry Baldero was filmed with an audience, and presents music and songs, skits and sketches, including The Restaurant, The Conductor, The Apartment, Jimmy and Company and a drama. Songs; Loving and Living, Looking So Nice, Trouble, Follow the Wind, My Baby Left Me, When the Leaves Turn in September, The Whistlers, The Angles, and Swinging Sounds. Cast: Judy Armstrong, Brian Crabb, Paul Soles, and Diane Stapley. Musical Director, Allan MacMillan.
169	6	"Thomas' Elegy"	Mervyn Rosenzveig	Enid Abrahams	19 October 1966	
Please add a Plot Summary here, replacing this text. For guidance, see How to write a plot summary and the Television Plot Manual of Style.^{MOS:TVPLOT} Cast: Danny McIlravey, Kirstin Campbell, Lorraine Foreman, Tom Harvey, Jane Mallett, and Lynne Gorman. Notes: Producer, Gordon Hinch. This 30-minute episode was followed by the one-hour Music Canada episode "Prelude to Expo".
170	7	"Spirit of the Deed"	David Gardner	Based on : "The Third Person"; Short story by : Henry James; Written by : Michael Sinelnikoff	26 October 1966	
170	7	"You Can Always Learn Something from a Lady"	Unknown	Willie "the Lion" Smith	26 October 1966	
Part 1 (60 minutes). Spirit of the Deed: Please add a Plot Summary here, replacing this text. For guidance, see How to write a plot summary and the Television Plot Manual of Style.^{MOS:TVPLOT} Cast: Mary Savidge (Susan Frush), Amelia Hall (Amy Frush), Gordon Pinsent (Cuthbert Frush), Louise Nichol, Rex Sevenoaks, and Michael Snow. Part 2 (30 minutes). You Can Always Learn Something from a Lady: CBC Television invites Willie "the Lion" Smith to record a show focusing on his compositions as one of the last great jazz kings of Harlem "stride" piano. As elder statesman, he performs and discusses music with fellow jazz pianist Don Ewell. Notes: Production personnel: Gordon Hinch, Leo Orenstein, Bill Zaharuk, Vlad Handera, Dave Gillman.
171	8	"New Bottles, New Wine"	Ron Kelly	Enid Abrahams	9 November 1966	
Please add a Plot Summary here, replacing this text. For guidance, see How to write a plot summary and the Television Plot Manual of Style.^{MOS:TVPLOT} Cast: Patricia Collins, Don Harron, Brady McNamara, Sandy Webster, Aileen Seaton and Pat Moffatt. Notes: Filmed in Applewood Hills, Cooksville. This 30-minute episode was followed by a one-hour Intertel program.
172	9	"My Lost Saints"	Tad Mosel	Curt Reis	30 November 1966	
172	9	"Brecht: A Threepenny Profile"	Mario Prizek	Antony Ferry	30 November 1966	
Part 1 (60 minutes). My Lost Saints: Please add a Plot Summary here, replacing this text. For guidance, see How to write a plot summary and the Television Plot Manual of Style.^{MOS:TVPLOT} Cast: Brett Somers, Alice Hill, Jack Creley, Charmion King. and Kirsten Campbell. Part 2 (30 minutes). Brecht: A Threepenny Profile: Please add a Plot Summary here, replacing this text. For guidance, see How to write a plot summary and the Television Plot Manual of Style.^{MOS:TVPLOT} Cast: Hugh Webster as Bertold Brecht, Chris Wiggins, John Horton, Budd Knapp, Anna Reiser, Gwen Thomas, and Patrick Sinclair.
173	10	"The Blues"	Paddy Sampson	Music by : Blues artists Researched by : Martin Lavut; Teleplay by : Barry Callaghan	28 December 1966	
Several of America's greatest living blues performers assemble together for the first time in a television studio. Barry Callaghan hosts this ninety-minute unrehearsed session of music and conversation, in which, in their own words, the musicians discuss and define the blues, and elaborate on its origins, history, styles, and its meaning to them personally. Featured musicians and musical performances include: Folk/blues guitarist Brownie McGhee and harmonica player Sonny Terry who have recorded numerous songs together. They perform Hooray, Hooray, these Women is Killing Me and Changed the Lock on the Door. McGhee performs Living with the Blues, Under Your Hood, and My Father's Words.; Guitarist/bassist Willie Dixon performs Nervous.; Georgia-born one-man band musician Jesse Fuller performs Stranger's Blues and Double Double, Do I Love You.; Mable Hillery sings How Long that Old Train Been Gone.; Guitarist Booker White performs Give Me an Old Lady.; You Can't Lose What You Never Had and Got My Mojo Working are performed by the "father of modern Chicago blues" Muddy Waters and his band including Otis Spann (piano), James Cotton (harmonica), Samuel Longhorn (guitar), James Madison (guitar), and Jimmy Lee Morris (bass).; Pianist Otis Spann performs Moving Up the Road and The Blues Don't Like Nobody.; Pianist Sunnyland Slim, and guitarist Big Joe Williams are also featured. The entire cast performs together to close out the show, with CBC studio musicians Bill Britto and Canadian jazz drummer Archie Alleyne providing accompaniment. Notes: "The Blues" originally aired in Season 6 as a one-hour show on 23 February 1966. It was re-edited with additional footage into this 90-minute presentation. Executive Producer, Robert Allen. Producer, Paddy Sampson. Studio Director, Patrick King.
174	11	"The Taming of the Shrew"	Mario Prizek	Play by : William Shakespeare; Adapted by : John Bethune	11 January 1967	
Please add a Plot Summary here, replacing this text. For guidance, see How to write a plot summary and the Television Plot Manual of Style.^{MOS:TVPLOT} Cast: Susan Clark (Katherina), David Buck (Petruchio), Chris Newton (Lucentio), Bruno Gerussi (Grumio), Gordon Pinsent (Tranio), Drew Thompson (Pedant), John Drainie (Baptista), Gillie Fenwick (Vincentio), John Horton (Hortensio), Jack Creley (Gremio), and Diana Barrington (Bianca).
175	12	"Teresa Stratas 1967"	Unknown	Mozart · Tchaikovsky · Verdi · Jacques Offenbach	25 January 1967	
Canadian soprano Teresa Stratas, star of the Metropolitan Opera, performs excerpts from her repertoire, with baritone Louis Quilico, contralto Patricia Rideout, and the Festival Orchestra conducted by Walter Susskind. Performances include, "Cherubino's Aria" from Mozart's opera The Marriage of Figaro, and songs from La Périchole by Jacques Offenbach. In "The Letter Scene" from Tchaikovsky's opera Eugene Onegin, Stratas sings the role of Tatjana, with Praticia Rideout as The Nurse. In scenes from Giuseppe Verdi's opera La Traviata, Act II, Stratas performs the role of Violetta, with Quilico as the elder Germont, tenor Robert Jeffrey as Alfredo, Kathy Newman as Annina, and tenor Ermanno Mauro as The Gardener.
176	13	"Yerma"	Leo Orenstein	Play by : Federico García Lorca; Adapted by : Alvin Goldman	8 February 1967	
177	14	"The Devil Makes Three"	Mario Prizek	Marc Brandel	15 February 1967	
Please add a Plot Summary here, replacing this text. For guidance, see How to write a plot summary and the Television Plot Manual of Style.^{MOS:TVPLOT} Cast: David Oxley (Wycherly), Barbara Shelley (Ruth), David Hemmings (Deniken), Ivor Barry (Voal), Gerard Parkes (Inspector Milne), Mel Scott (Bartender), Sydney Brown (Sergean Ross), Richard Bond (Robin). Notes: Produced by Mario Prizek. The duration was unusually 67 minutes. To fill the remaining 90-minutes of air-time, Charles Huguenot van der Linden's 1962 short film "Big City Blues" aired, featuring trumpeter Nelson Williams.
178	15	"The Puppet Caravan"	Paul Almond	Story by : Marie-Claire Blais; Adapted by : Mavor Moore	1 March 1967	
178	15	"The Fifth-Floor People"	Mervyn Rosenzveig	Stanley Mann	1 March 1967	
Part 1 (30 minutes). The Puppet Caravan: Please add a Plot Summary here, replacing this text. For guidance, see How to write a plot summary and the Television Plot Manual of Style.^{MOS:TVPLOT} Cast: Geneviève Bujold, François Tassé, and Jean Doyon. Part 2 (60 minutes). The Fifth-Floor People: Please add a Plot Summary here, replacing this text. For guidance, see How to write a plot summary and the Television Plot Manual of Style.^{MOS:TVPLOT} Cast: Ted Follows, Neil McCallum, Patricia Collins, Jane Mallett, Gillie Fenwick, Paul Harding.
179	16	"Enoch Soames"	Melwyn Breen	Short story by : Max Beerbohm; Adapted by : Mavor Moore	15 March 1967	
Please add a Plot Summary here, replacing this text. For guidance, see How to write a plot summary and the Television Plot Manual of Style.^{MOS:TVPLOT} Cast: Brian Petchey, Colin Fox, Joseph Shaw, Leslie Yeo, Steven Baron, and Richard Bidlake. Notes: Duration, 30 minutes. Preceded by a rerun of the Cariboo Country episode "The Education of Phyllistine".
180	17	"Variations"	Rudi Dorn	Rudi Dorn	22 March 1967	
181	18	"To Every Man His Bach"	Unknown	Unknown	29 March 1967	
181	18	"Access"	Unknown	Unknown	29 March 1967	
Part 1 (60 minutes). To Every Man His Bach: Decca classical records producer John Culshaw introduces this hour, featuring the BBC's head of music and arts programs, Sir Humphrey Burton, and pianist Glenn Gould, discussing the future of music performance and composition, with excerpts played by Gould (e.g., Goldberg Variation #4 by Bach). Gould suggests concert hall classical music performance is outdated with modern-age electronic delivery, prognosticating that the concert business might fail by 1999. Gould predicts electronic music is the future, and home listeners will "conduct" their own "performance" turning dials, and even compose by adjusting sine waves. Home editing machines, interpretations, and variations are examined, with excerpts from Piano Sonata No. 5 (Beethoven), Allemande from Bach's Partita No. 5, and Beethoven's Emperor Concerto with Leopold Stokowski. Gould explains why he prefers the recording studio to stage performance, his difficulty recording fugues from The Well-Tempered Clavier, and combining two different takes, like a film editor does. He plays the fugue. In summation Culshaw concludes, "The listener of the future will participate much more in...responding to music and in creating the conditions he wants...a healthy...creative development." Part 2 (30 minutes). Access: Please add a Plot Summary here, replacing this text. For guidance, see How to write a plot summary and the Television Plot Manual of Style.^{MOS:TVPLOT} Cast and subject: A relationship drama between a mother (Kate Reid), her teenage son (Miles Jordan), and divorced father (Gerard Parkes).
182	19	"The True Bleeding Heart of Martin B."	George Bloomfield	M. Charles Cohen	26 April 1967	
183	20	"Lady Windermere's Fan"	Mario Prizek	Play by : Oscar Wilde; Adapted by : John Bethune	10 May 1967	

Previous: Season 6	List of Festival episodes	Succeeded by Season 8
