= The Lesson =

1951 one-act play by Eugène Ionesco

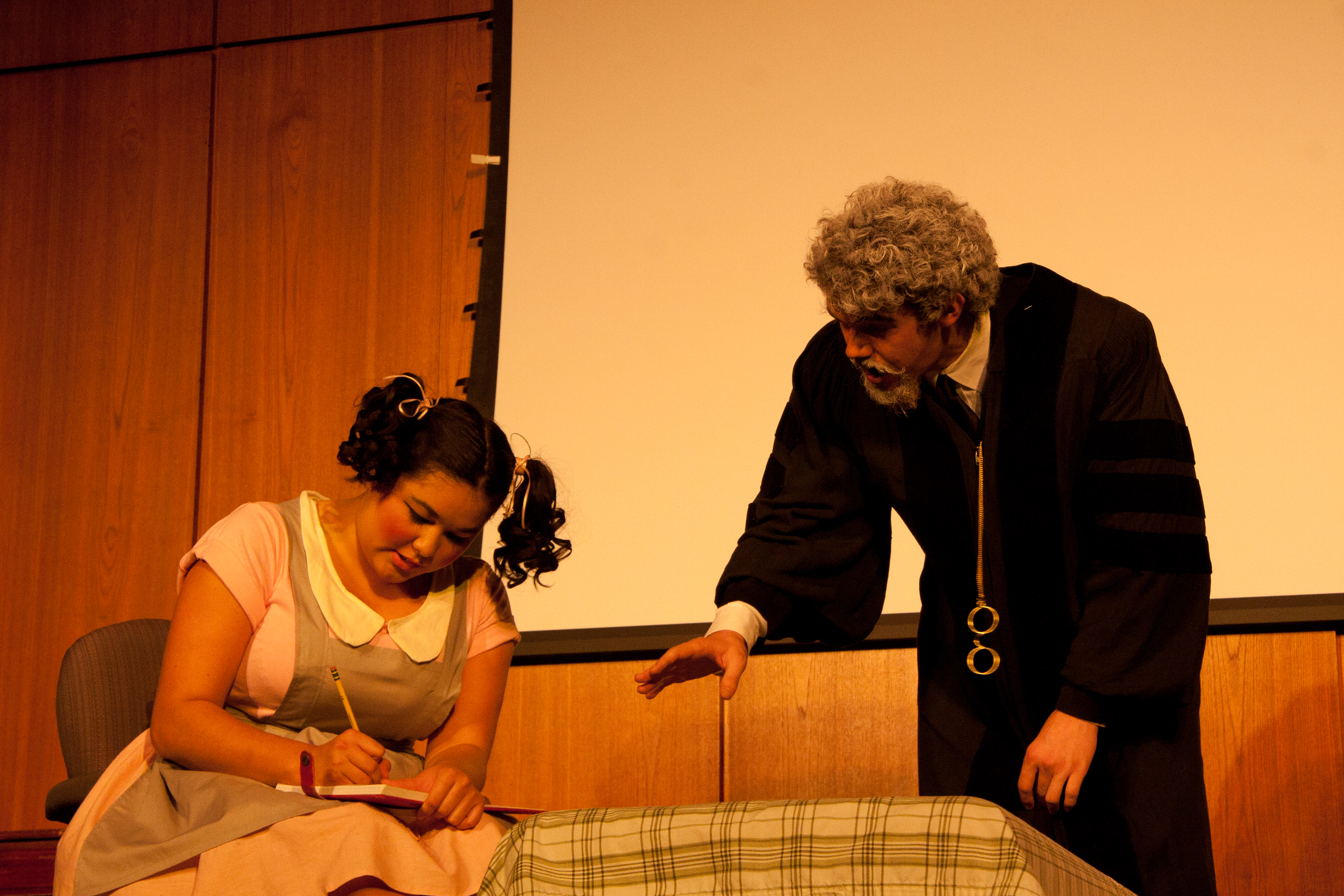
- Image from Shimer College production
- Original language: French
- Written by: Eugène Ionesco
- Characters: Professor • Pupil • Maid
- Genre: One-act; Theatre of the Absurd
- Setting: France

Premiere
- Date: February 1951
- Place: Paris, France

The Lesson (French: La Leçon) is a one-act play by French-Romanian playwright Eugène Ionesco. It was first performed in 1951 in a production directed by Marcel Cuvelier (who also played the Professor). Since 1957 it has been in permanent showing at Paris' Théâtre de la Huchette, on an Ionesco double-bill with The Bald Soprano. The play is regarded as an important work in the "Theatre of the Absurd".

== Plot summary ==
This play takes place in the office and dining room of a small French flat. The Professor, a man of 50 to 60, is expecting a new Pupil (aged 18). The Professor's Maid, a stout, red-faced woman of 40 to 50, worries about the Professor's health. As the absurd and nonsensical lesson progresses, the Professor grows more and more angry with what he perceives as the Pupil's ignorance, and the Pupil becomes more and more quiet and meek. Even her health begins to deteriorate, and what starts as a toothache develops into her entire body aching. At the climax of the play, after a long bout of non sequiturs (which are frequently used in Ionesco's plays), the Professor stabs and murders the Pupil. The play ends with the Maid greeting a new Pupil, taking the play full circle, back to the beginning.

In the text of Ionesco's play, the story ends with the Maid handing the Professor an armband with a swastika on it. She instructs him to put it on, because then no one will ask any questions about all the students he has murdered, asserting that it's "good politics." For many years, however, productions have deleted this detail, claiming that audiences would be too shocked by it, or that it narrows a more universal message of the play. Many scholars, however, argue that this deletion defangs the play and intentionally obscures Ionesco's point.

== Adaptations ==
The Danish choreographer Flemming Flindt adapted the play as the libretto to a score by Georges Delerue for his first ballet, The Private Lesson (Enetime) in 1963. The Professor in Flindt's adaptation is a ballet teacher. The ballet was commissioned by Danish television and received its 1964 stage premiere in Paris with the Royal Danish Ballet on tour. Among other companies, it is danced by the Joffrey Ballet and the leading role has been performed by Rudolf Nureyev as well as other danseurs. In 2009, PK Productions, under the direction of Patrick Kennedy staged the play at the Edinburgh Fringe Festival as a naturalistic drama. The minimalist theatre company, Cesear’s Forum, presented the play in combination with an abridged version of Ugo Betti’s The Fugitive at Playhouse Square, Cleveland, OH in 2023. It was entitled A Fugitive’s Lesson.

== See also ==
- Long-running plays (non-musicals)

== Sources ==
- Banham, Martin, ed. 1998. The Cambridge Guide to Theatre. Cambridge: Cambridge UP. ISBN 0-521-43437-8.
