= Margaret Draper =

American actress

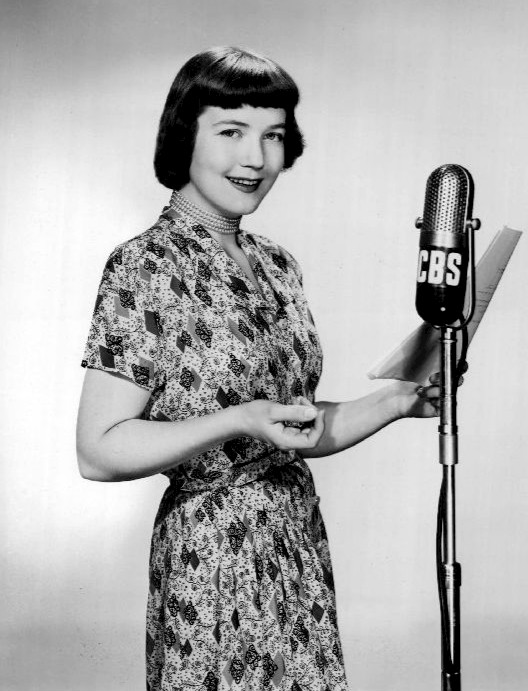
- Margaret Draper The Brighter Day 1950
- Born: Margaret Ruth Draper; November 20, 1916; Spanish Fork, Utah, U.S.
- Died: October 14, 2011 (aged 94); Payson, Utah, U.S.
- Occupation: Actress
- Years active: 1934–1985

Margaret Ruth Draper (November 20, 1916 – October 14, 2011) was an American actress and international service worker.

== Early years ==
Draper was born in 1916, the third of six children born to Delbert Morley Draper and Frances Mary Rogers. Shortly after her birth her family relocated to Salt Lake City where she lived until 1934.

A 1940 newspaper article noted that she "is pleasantly remembered for her performances in Theta Alpha Phi productions" at the University of Utah.

The summer she graduated from university, she accompanied a friend and his sister to New York City to pursue a career in the theatre. She went with a single bag and $38.50 in her purse. Alone in New York, she found a small room in Tudor City and soon began working in G. Schirmer's music store.

== Career ==
In the late 1930s through 1940, Draper was active in the theater in the Eastern United States for four seasons. She worked with the Wharf School of the Theater, Provincetown, Massachusetts; Green Lake Players, Buffalo, New York; Cherry Lane Theatre, New York City, New York; and Chekhov Theater Studio, Ridgefield, Connecticut.

During World War II, she worked for two years for the Red Cross in Europe and the Middle East as a recreational director, and returned to lean years in New York until 1947, when she got her first radio role with Carl Beier in the CBS program, Joe Powers of Oakville. (Another source says: "In 1947, she joined with the Barter Theatre and for a year toured with that company throughout the southwest. In March of 1948, she returned to New York and radio ....")

She later appeared in the Actor's Equity presentation of "Peer Gynt", and was voted one of the most promising actresses of the year. She obtained supporting roles in two Broadway shows, played the part of Fay Perkins in the radio soap opera Ma Perkins, and in 1949 was invited to audition for the part of Liz Dennis in Brighter Day. She won the part, and played Liz until around 1954, when the part of Linda Pepper was being cast for Pepper Young's Family, which she won. ^

Draper portrayed Eva Petri in The Gambler on Broadway in 1952. Her other Broadway credits included A Minor Adjustment, during the 1967-1968 season.

== Later years and death ==
In 2003, Draper moved to an independent living community in Salt Lake City. In the fall of 2010, she moved to her son's home in Payson, Utah, and the following spring she settled in a care facility in that same town, where she died on October 14, 2011, aged 94.
