= Canada 98 =

1964 Canadian documentary TV series

- Also known as: Canada 99 (1965–66), Canada 100 (1966–67)
- Genre: Documentary
- Written by: Charles Israel (Canada 98), Hugh Kemp (Canada 98,99), Scott Young (Canada 98), Clement Perron (Canada 98,99), Don Erickson (Canada 98), Ben Maartman, David Fulton (Canada 100), Max Ferguson (Canada 100)
- Directed by: Gerald Richardson (Canada 98), Farley Mowat (Canada 100), David Pears (Canada 100)
- Presented by: J. Frank Willis, Gordie Tapp (interviewer)
- Narrated by: John Scott (Canada 99), Budd Knapp (Canada 99), J. Frank Willis (Canada 99)
- Composers: Ricky Hyslop, Ben McPeek (Canada 100)
- Country of origin: Canada
- Original language: English
- No. of seasons: 3
- No. of episodes: 9

Production
- Executive producer: Thom Benson
- Producers: Ron Kelly (Canada 98), Michael Rothery (Canada 98,99,100), Daryl Duke (Canada 99), Hugh Kemp (Canada 99), Ron Bashford (Canada 100)
- Production location: Canada
- Cinematography: Grahame Woods (Canada 98), Norman Allin (Canada 98), David Carr (Canada 99), Ken Gregg (Canada 100) (camera), Jack V. Long (Canada 99) (cinematography)

Original release
- Network: CBC
- Release: November 25, 1964 – April 16, 1967

Related
- Camera Canada

Canada 98 (later Canada 99 then Canada 100 in each successive debut year) is a Canadian Centennial documentary television series presented by CBC Television. The series debuted on November 25, 1964, to showcase Canada's nature. the series was hosted by J. Frank Willis featuring nine episodes (despite twelve being produced). Canada 98 was preceded by the documentary film Camera Canada.

== Sources ==
- Queen's University Directory of CBC Television Series (Canada 98 archived listing link via archive.org)
