= Scarlett Hill =

Canadian soap opera

Scarlett Hill is a Canadian soap opera (first written for CBC Television) which aired from October 1962 to 1964. This was the first daytime soap opera produced for Canadian television, although it was based upon an American radio drama created by Robert and Kathleen Lindsay.

The series focused on the residents of a boarding house, and starred John Drainie, Ed McNamara, Gordon Pinsent, and Beth Lockerbie.

The series was syndicated to the United Kingdom, Australia and the US; in America, the show ran in syndication from 1965 to 1966 on a handful of stations.

== Cast ==
The cast included:

- Ivor Barry: Walter Pendelton
- Suzanne Bryant: Janice Turner
- Beth Lockerbie: Kate Russell
- Ed McNamara: Harry
- Alan Pearce: Sidney
- Gordon Pinset: Dr. David Black
- Lucy Warner: Ginny
