= Dancer Transition Resource Centre =

- Formation: 1985
- Founder: Joysanne Sidimus
- Type: Charity / Non‑profit organization
- Purpose: Support for professional dancers transitioning to new careers
- Headquarters: Toronto, Ontario, Canada
- Region served: Canada
- Members: Professional dancers (Canada)
- Official language: English, French
- Website: www.dtrc.ca%20dtrc.ca

Founded in 1985 by former ballerina Joysanne Sidimus, the Dancer Transition Resource Centre (DTRC) is a Canadian charity that provides counselling and retraining grants to dancers making career transitions. In 2006, Joysanne Sidimus was awarded the Governor General's Performing Arts Award for Lifetime Artistic Achievement, in part due to her work establishing the Dancer Transition Resource Centre. Karen Kain was the founding Board President of the Dancer Transition Resource Centre.

== Activity ==
The Dancer Transition Resource Centre is a member of the International Organization for the Transition of Professional Dancers (IOTPD). Other organizations in the IOTPD include: Career Transition For Dancers (US), The Dancers' Career Development (UK), Association Pour la Reconversion des Danseurs Professionnels (Switzerland).
