= The Fugitive (Ugo Betti play) =

Play by Ugo Betti

The Fugitive (La Fuggitiva) is the last play of Italian playwright Ugo Betti, completed six months before his death. It was first performed posthumously, at the Teatro le Fenice in Venice, in 1953. In 2023, the minimalist theatre company, Cesear's Forum, presented an abridged version of the play in combination with Eugene Ionesco's The Lesson at Playhouse Square, Cleveland, Ohio. It was entitled A Fugitive’s Lesson.

== Plot ==
Set in a small Italian town rife with petty intrigue and gossip, it begins with Daniele, a minor civil servant, leaving town, ostensibly to attend a professional conference in Bologna. Actually, however, he is headed toward the border, planning to desert his wife Nina, who he finds insufferable. His plans are frustrated, however, by the appearance of a mysterious stranger, who introduces himself as a doctor, and begins to delve into the real dynamics of Daniele's marriage. Though the stranger urges Daniele to proceed with his plan, the young man is increasingly drawn back to his wife. When he returns home, he finds that Nina seems to have killed his supervisor, who had tried to coerce her sexually. Nina involves her husband in the murder plot, and eventually accuses him of the murder.

Although Daniele could easily wash his hands of the entire matter, his continuing conversations with the mysterious 'doctor' lead him to discover the sexual, ethical, and even spiritual dimensions of his bond to Nina. When she is mysteriously wounded while trying to flee the town, Daniele helps her to the border, and confronts an invisible God, and challenges Him to justify Nina's suffering. In a final confrontation, Daniele repudiates the cynical nihilism of the 'doctor.'

== Style and themes ==
In this, his last play, Betti fragments stage space, jumping from one locale to another in the first act, and even dividing the stage into two widely separated locales at once. Although the play's plot, rife with deception, blackmail and murder, might seem the stuff of melodrama, Betti's primary interest is in the deepening understanding of human existence undergone by Daniele. Daniele's relationship to his mysterious companion is highly reminiscent of that between Faust and Mephistopheles in Goethe's Faust, its final scene in the mountains, with the tempter urging Daniele to desert his dying wife providing a strong parallel to the end of Part I of Goethe's drama. But, although Daniele has learned much from his Mephistopheles, he finally needs to repudiate him. Betti's vision combines elements of existentialism with a theistic vision.

The 'fugitive' of the title is, most immediately, Nina, who is described as being in desperate flight from the higher power that called her into existence. But Nina's case is presented as representative of all humans beings, not pathological, and the play's repeated imagery of borders and flight (common in much of Betti's work) expresses a vision of human existence as exile.

== Quotation ==
"A blade of grass that grew differently from the way He intended when it was sown. So that the harvest that He reaps is both fascinating and unfamiliar, one that he considers both fascinating and familiar. Perhaps it is for that very reason that the seeds are sown." (Trans. G. H. McWilliam)
