= Lucy Warner =

Canadian actress

- Born: Lucy Howard Warner; 7 June 1943 (age 82)
- Occupation: Actress
- Years active: 1959–1970

Lucy Warner (born 7 June 1943) is a Canadian actress. She is known for her role as Emily Blair on the Canadian occult-supernatural soap opera – Strange Paradise.

== Biography ==
Lucy Warner, the daughter of American parents, attended London Central Collegiate Institute and London's Theatre School in Ontario. She started her professional acting career in 1959, after she was discovered at the amateur Ontario's London Little Theatre in 1958.

Warner's early television role was in a 1962 episode of Playdate, and occasional appearances in the soap drama Scarlett Hill soon followed. She also appeared in the film short Stand by for Life (1963) and starred in small roles in Seaway and Festival. In 1969, she was cast for her most-remembered character – researcher Emily Blair in supernatural series "Strange Paradise".

Shortly afterward, Lucy left both Canada and the acting profession. She later relocated with her family to the South and worked for the University of Miami in Coral Gables, Florida.

== Personal life ==
Lucy Warner married Nels Richard Nelson – a property developer and entrepreneur. In 2011, they retired to Delta, Colorado. Nels died on December 7, 2020.

== Filmography ==
=== Film ===
Year	Title	Role	Notes
1963	Stand by for Life	a nursing assistant	(Short)

=== Television ===
Year	Title	Role	Notes
1962	Playdate	Jean Stanyer	Episode: "Two-Faced Angel"
1963	Scarlett Hill		occasional appearances
1965	Moment of Truth		
1965	Masters in Our Own House	Solange Denis	TV film
1966	Seaway	Gina	Episode: "Billy the Kid"
1967	Festival	Carrie	Episode: "The Paper People"
1968	Quentin Durgens, M.P.		Episode: "The Road to Chaldea"
1970	Strange Paradise	Emily Blair	regular appearances
1970	Corwin	Jim Holindrake's lover	Episode: " Who Is the Fat Cat?"

== Stage ==
Year	Title	Role	Notes
1959	As You Like It	understudy to Frances Hyland	Festival Theatre, Stratford, Ontario
1959	Othello	walk-on part	Festival Theatre, Stratford, Ontario
1960	A Midsummer Night's Dream	Lady to Hippolyta	Festival Theatre, Stratford, Ontario
