= The Gambler (Betti) =

The Gambler (Italian: Il giocatore) is an Italian-language play in three acts by Ugo Betti that was first performed in Italy in 1950. An abstract morality play, the plot revolves around the character of David Petri who out of both ego and boredom conspires to have his loving and doting wife, Eva Petri, murdered by hiring a group of invading soldiers to commit the deed on his behalf.

In 1952 the play was staged on Broadway at the Lyceum Theatre in an English-language adaptation by Alfred Drake and Edward Eager. Drake starred as David Petri with Margaret Draper portraying his wife Eva. Others in the cast included Anne Burr as Eva's mother Alma Reich, Percy Waram as the Station Master, E. G. Marshall as Ernest Bruni, Philip Coolidge as Commissioner Costa, and Constance Clausen as Paula Mori. The Broadway production was directed by Herman Shumlin.
