= Camera Canada =

- Country of origin: Canada
- Original language: English
- No. of seasons: 2

Production
- Executive producer: Thom Benson
- Running time: 60 minutes

Original release
- Network: CBC Television
- Release: 13 November 1961 – 14 January 1963

Camera Canada is a Canadian documentary television series that aired on CBC Television from 1961 to 1963.

== Premise ==
This was an occasional series of documentaries concerning modern Canadian history, filmed by various producers. It was inspired by the results of various CBC documentaries broadcast in mid-1960.

== Scheduling ==
The series was randomly scheduled approximately once per month between 13 November 1961 and 14 January 1963. Camera Canada episodes were generally hour-long productions which were frequently broadcast on Mondays, usually in place of the normal Festival time slot.

== Episodes ==
- "The Annanacks" (René Bonnière producer/director; Lloyd Bochner narrator; Crawley Films company), featuring an Inuit community
- "Big Country" (Norman Caton; Len Peterson writer; Don Francks narrator), concerning a western Canadian cattle drive
- "Boys Village" (Ron Kelly director), concerning a reform school
- "Camera on Canada" (Gene Lawrence director)
- "Campus in the Clouds" (Norman Caton producer), featuring the Banff School of Fine Arts
- "The Changing Island" (J. Frank Willis producer/host)
- "Ciao Maria" (Ron Kelly; Bruno Gerussi narrator), featuring Italians in Toronto
- "False Faces" (René Bonnière producer/director; Crawley Films company), featuring an Iroquois-Huron ceremony in 1961. Bonnière later made a fictional feature film with Crawley Films called Amanita Pestilens (released in 1963).
- "Gold: The Fabulous Years" (Gene Lawrence producer; Hugh Kemp writer)
- "High Arctic Hunter" (Gene Lawrence producer; Doug Wilkinson writer/director)
- "Hockey: An Affectionate Look"
- "Last Summer" (Thom Benson writer), regarding mating in nature; aired 11 December 1961
- "The Looking Glass People" (Norman Campbell producer/director; George Salverson writer; Budd Knapp narrator), regarding ballet
- "The Lost Decade" (Ben Maartman writer; Ron Kelly director), concerning the Great Depression
- "The Measure of Man" (Norman Caton producer), featuring the study of the mind and its methods
- "My Enemy" (Bob Orchard; Michael Rothery producers), from the Andre Chamson short story
- "The Opening of the West" (Gene Lawrence producer; Scott Young writer; J. Frank Willis narrator)
- "Pelly Bay" (Ron Kelly), regarding the activities of an Inuk person
- "The Promised Land"
- "The Short Sweet Summer" (Norman Campbell producer; Hugh Kemp writer), featuring the 1963 tour of the National Youth Orchestra of Canada.
- "Tale of Three Cities"
- "The Unknown Country Revisited" (Bruce Hutchinson) – Canadians' express views about their nation. This documentary followed Hutchinson as he revisited parts of Canada he documented in his 1942 book The Unknown Country: Canada and Her People.
- "Upper Canada Village" (Gene Lawrence producer)
- "The View From Geneva" (Maurice Taylor director; Hugh Kemp writer; Princess Grace (Monaco) narrator), featuring the Red Cross
- "Wilderness" (Norman Caton), regarding the wildernesses of Alberta, British Columbia and the Yukon; a plane crash killed Caton and two camera operators during production of this documentary.
- "The World of Bobby Hull" (Scott Young writer)
- A documentary comparing current and 1930s university graduates (Hugh MacLennan)
- A feature on the newly created Canada Council and its first director, A. W. Trueman.

== Controversy ==
"Ciao Maria", broadcast in January 1963, portrayed the lives of some selected Italian-Canadians. However, the portrayal of that community drew outrage from Toronto Italian community leaders such as broadcaster Johnny Lombardi and Toronto Roman Catholic priest Emmanuel Faraone. They complained that the documentary provided a distorted, low-brow view of Italians and failed to show the community's positive moral and cultural attributes.

After the end of this series, the CBC produced documentaries in anticipation of the 1967 Canadian Centennial under the Canada 98, Canada 99 and Canada 100 titles.
