= Joysanne Sidimus =

Canadian ballet dancer

Joysanne Sidimus is a Canadian ballet dancer and founder of the Dancer Transition Resource Centre and the Artists’ Health Centre of Toronto Western Hospital. She served as ballet mistress for the Ballet Repertory Company and Grands Ballets de Genève.

== Career ==
She is a member of the artistic staff of the National Ballet of Canada as guest répétiteur for more than 30 years. She has taught at American Ballet Theatre, Dance Theatre of Harlem, Canada's National Ballet School, L’École supérieure de ballet du Québec, Royal Winnipeg Ballet School, and North Carolina School of the Arts. She authored the book Exchanges: Life After Dance and co-authored the book Reflections in a Dancing Eye: Investigating the Artist's Role in Canadian Society.

== Awards ==
Sidimus received the Governor General's Meritorious Service Medal and the 2006 Governor General's Performing Arts Award for Lifetime Artistic Achievement.
