= Ermanno Mauro =

Canadian opera singer

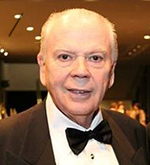
Ermanno Mauro at his Order of Canada Ceremony

Ermanno Mauro, OC (born 20 January 1939, in Rovigno d'istria) is an Italian-born Canadian operatic tenor who has received the Order of Canada.

He lived in Florence prior to emigrating to Canada in 1958 where he initially worked as an automobile mechanic. He became a naturalized Canadian citizen in 1963. He made his opera debut in 1962 with the Alberta Opera Company.

He has sung all over the world including at the Metropolitan Opera, Teatro alla Scala (La Scala), Royal Opera House, Palais Garnier, and many more. In 1976 and 1979, he sang as lead tenor at Palais Garnier. Ermanno has also played the lead role in such operas as Il trovatore, Pagliacci, La bohème, etc.
