= Harold Gomberg =

American oboist (1916–1985)

Harold Gomberg (November 30, 1916 – September 7, 1985) was the principal (first or solo) oboist of the New York Philharmonic from 1943 through 1977.

== Biography ==
Born in Malden, Massachusetts, Harold and his brother Ralph studied with Marcel Tabuteau, considered the father of American oboe playing, at the Curtis Institute of Music in Philadelphia. Prior to joining the New York Philharmonic, Gomberg held positions with the National Symphony Orchestra, the Toronto Symphony and the St. Louis Symphony. He was a longtime member of the faculty of the Juilliard School, and recorded several albums of solo oboe repertoire during his career.

Harold Gomberg was also an avid painter, and was married to the harpist/composer Margret Brill. He died of a heart attack in Capri.
