= Bethune (1965 film) =

1964 television film about Norman Bethune

- Genre: Documentary
- Written by: Donald Brittain; John Kemeny
- Directed by: Donald Brittain
- Narrated by: Lister Sinclair
- Country of origin: Canada
- Original language: English

Production
- Producers: Donald Brittain; John Kemeny
- Editor: John Kemeny
- Running time: 58 minutes
- Budget: $78,874

Original release
- Network: CBC Television
- Release: January 13, 1965

Bethune is a 1965 Canadian documentary based on the life of Norman Bethune that aired on CBC Television.

== Production ==
John Kemeny, a producer at the National Film Board, wanted to make a documentary about Norman Bethune after reading The Scalpel, the Sword: The Story of Dr. Norman Bethune by Ted Allan and Sydney Gordon. It was filmed with a budget of $78,874 (equivalent to $770,899 in 2025). Kemeny edited the film while co-producing and co-writing it with Donald Brittain, the film's director, and it was narrated by Lister Sinclair.

The NFB was afraid of creating a film about Bethune due to his communist beliefs and affiliation with Mao Zedong, but Brittain focused on Bethune's activities and stated that "in another century he might have been a crusader or a troubadour" and that "Bethune decides to throw in with the Communist Party. However, Bethune the Marxist does not interfere with Bethune the happy wanderer".

The distribution branch of the NFB believed that the film could be dubbed into Mandarin Chinese in an attempt to enter the Chinese market, which they had been unsuccessful at since 1959. Marcel Cadieux, the Under-Secretary of State for External Affairs, opposed it and Secretary of State for External Affairs Paul Martin Sr. limited film exports to China to only educational or scientific films after discussing the matter with Cadieux. Guy Roberge, the commissioner of the NFB, supported the organization's right to the distribution of its films.

== Release and reception ==
The film was shown in November 1964 at the Leipzig International Festival in East Germany alongside two other NFB films, Stravinsky and Eskimo Artist: Kenojuak, when the Ministry of External Affairs attempted to block its distribution in communist countries. The film also won the highest award at the film festival resulting in every communist country, except for Albania and the Soviet Union, wanting to televise the movie. Roberge told Cadieux that the decision to screen the film in East Germany was made before the NFB was prohibited from showing the film in communist countries. He also argued that the film could not be used for propaganda by communist countries due to it focusing on Bethune's humanitarianism. However, Cadieux cited a report that a showing of non-political NFB films, including Bethune, at Moscow State University by Canadian foreign exchange students was cancelled.

The film was aired on the CBC Television anthology series Festival on 13 January 1965, and received positive reviews. The film was televised in Czechoslovakia while being available at Canadian embassies in other communist countries. Roberge informed the distribution branch to stop promoting the film in communist countries and Spain, due to Bethune support of the Republicans during the Spanish Civil War. The contract to televise the film in Poland was cancelled by the NFB.

Grant McLean, whose 1947 film The People Between was criticized by the Ministry of External Affairs for being favorable towards the Chinese Communist Party, wrote a letter criticizing the restricted release and stated that the film could promote understanding between both sides of the Iron Curtain. His letter was a possible reason for him not being selected as commissioner of the NFB by its board of governors, which included Cadieux.

The film was not promoted in the United States and only seven copies were sold within the first years of its release. The Ministry of External Affairs lifted its restrictions on the film in 1971, but by the 1990s it only had one television showing in Yugoslavia in 1978.

== Works cited ==
- Evans, Gary (1991). In the National Interest: A Chronicle of the National Film Board of Canada from 1949 to 1989. University of Toronto Press. ISBN 0802027849.
