= Leo Orenstein =

Canadian director, producer and writer

Leo Alan Orenstein (24 July 1919 – 5 February 2009) was a Canadian director, producer and writer who worked primarily in television and theatre. At CBC Television alone, he was director or producer in over 150 works there, many of which were adaptations of works by such authors as Chekhov, Ibsen, George Bernard Shaw and Ionesco.

== Career ==
Orenstein was born in Montreal, Quebec, to parents Max and Minnie Orenstein and moved to Toronto in childhood. After graduating from Central Technical School, he studied at New York City's American Artists School on a scholarship during which time he wrote for the Columbia Workshop radio series. During a second stint in New York, Orenstein wrote for The Skeptics, a nightclub group. Otherwise, his career was generally based in Toronto.

He wrote and produced The Big Leap, a theatre play which opened in 1952 at Toronto's Royal Alexandra Theatre. The production was adapted for CBC Television in 1953, and its later reprise at the Grand Dinner Theatre in Niagara Falls, Ontario lasted four years.

In 2006, Orenstein won the Full Length category in Theatre BC's Canadian National Playwriting Competition for Homeless Hannah.

Orenstein died in Toronto aged 89 at Mount Sinai Hospital.

=== Theatre ===
- 1950: Golden Boy, Dominion Drama Festival
- 1952: The Big Leap, Royal Alexandra Theatre (producer, writer)
- 1956: Zone, Crest Theatre

=== Filmography (television) ===
- Birthday Party (CBC Television)
- Murder Story (CBC Television)
- On Camera (CBC Television, producer)
- The Queen of Spades (CBC Television)
- To My Son With Love (CBC Television)
- General Motors Theatre / General Motors Presents (CBC Television, producer)
  - End of Summer (producer)
  - Forever Galatea (CBC Television)
  - The Vigilante
  - 1955: The Big Leap (CBC Television adaptation)
- 1954: Ad and Lib (producer)
- 3 October 1956: First Performance, "Time Lock" (producer)
- 1960: The Unforeseen (director, TV series)
- 1963: Have Figure Will Travel (director)
- 1973: The Starlost (CTV)
  - 29 September 1973: "Lazarus from the Mist" (director)
  - 13 October 1973: "The Pisces" (director)
