= George Crum (musician) =

American pianist and conductor (1926–2007)

For American composer George Henry Crumb, see George Crumb.

George Francis Crum (26 October 1926 in Providence, Rhode Island, USA – 8 September 2007 in Newmarket, Ontario, Canada) was the first conductor of the National Ballet of Canada and an accomplished pianist, vocal coach, and musical arranger.

== Early life ==
At the age of three, George Crum was brought to Canada. He attended Trinity College School in Port Hope and studied organ and piano with Edmund Cohu from the age of 12 to 16. Studies in piano also took place with Elsie Bennett and Mona Bates in Toronto. Crum made his recital debut at 16 at the Arts and Letters Club of Toronto.

From 1943 to 1947, he later studied theory and orchestration with Barbara Pentland and Ettore Mazzole, and opera coaching and conducting with Herman Geiger-Torel and Nicholas Goldschmidt at the Toronto Conservatory of Music. He also served as assistant to Goldschmidt and coach in the opera department.

== Conducting and career ==
Crum's debut as a conductor was with The Royal Conservatory of Music's opera division in 1948 in their production of Faust. Crum was the company's first chorus master, and stayed with the company as coach and assistant conductor for 3 years until 1951. He also taught on the piano faculty at the conservatory, notably instructing composer Hugh Davidson.

During this time, Crum also worked with the Opera Nacional de Centro-America in Guatemala (1949-1950).

George Crum later worked with many companies in many roles including chorus master of the CBC Opera Company throughout the 1950s and as the first conductor of the newly formed National Ballet of Canada at the invitation of founder Celia Franca. With the National Ballet, he conducted many notable performances, including productions Giselle and Orpheus in the Underworld.

During his time with the National Ballet, Crum had a myriad of other ventures. At the 1952 Salzburg Festival, he coached opera under Wilhelm Furtwängler. In May 1953, he conducted the CBC Opera Company in Don Giovanni, marking the first North-American full-length opera telecast. He also conducted at the opening of the National Arts Centre in 1969. Crum guest conducted in many international venues including the United States, Japan, and various stages throughout Europe.

Crum was named Music Director Emeritus at the National Ballet after his retirement from the company in 1984.

Though this was not the end of his involvement with the National Ballet of Canada. He guest conducted on numerous occasions, including some of the gala performances celebrating the company's 25th anniversary and for the production Prokofiev's Romeo and Juliet in 1989, prima ballerina Veronica Tennant's farewell performance. He also prepared musical arrangements and guest-conducted for other ballet companies including the New York's Joffrey Ballet and Mexico City's Ballet Teatro.

== Personal life ==
George Crum married his wife, Canadian soprano Patricia Snell in 1951, the same year he was appointed conductor of the National Ballet. They remained together until his death in 2007. He is survived by his two daughters Angie Derr and Jennie Coles. He also has six grandchildren: Cassie, Emily, Mack, Mollie, Sammie and Kyle.

During the inaugural ceremonies of President Miguel de la Madrid in 1980, George Crum served as cultural emissary to Mexico.
