= Byron Janis =

American classical pianist (1928–2024)

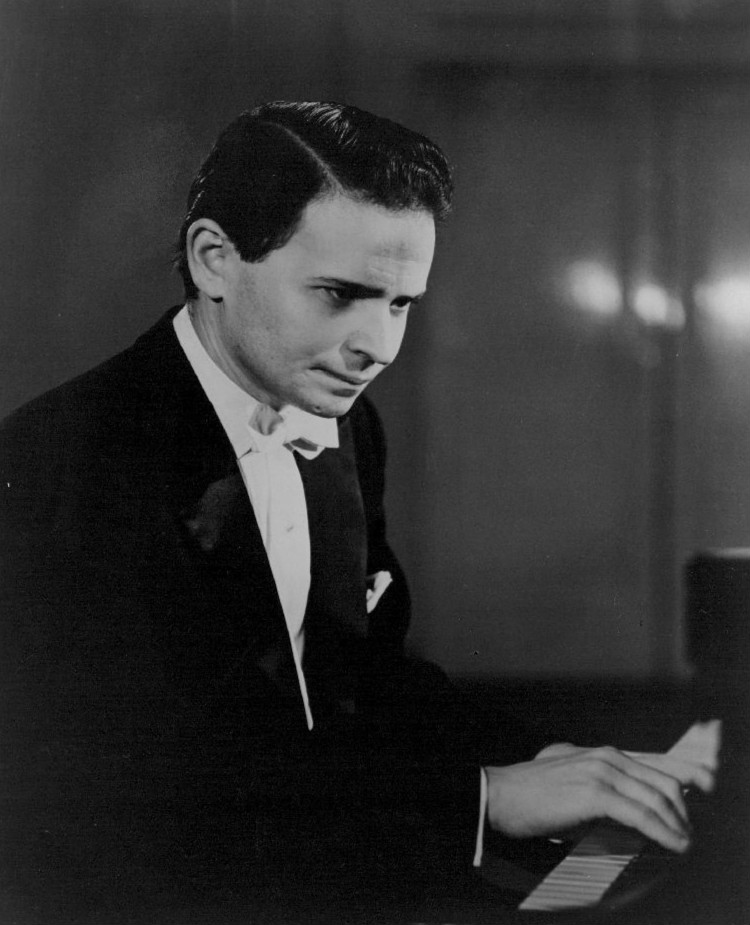
- Janis in 1962
- Born: Byron Yanks; March 24, 1928; McKeesport, Pennsylvania, U.S.
- Died: March 14, 2024 (aged 95); New York City, U.S.
- Occupation: classical pianist
- Years active: 1940–2024
- Spouses: June Dickson Wright (m. 1953; div. 1965) Maria Cooper (m. 1966)
- Children: 1
- Family: Gary Cooper (father-in-law); Veronica Cooper (mother-in-law)
- Website: www.byronjanis.com

Byron Janis (né Yanks; March 24, 1928 – March 14, 2024) was an American classical pianist. He made numerous recordings for RCA Victor and Mercury Records, and occupies two volumes of the Philips series Great Pianists of the 20th Century. His discography covered repertoire from Bach to David W. Guion and included major piano concertos from Mozart to Rachmaninoff and Liszt to Prokofiev.

== Biography ==
Janis was born Byron Yanks in McKeesport, Pennsylvania, on March 24, 1928, the younger of two children of Hattie Horelick and Samuel Yankilevitch, who had shortened his surname to Yanks after emigrating to America, before finally setting on the surname Janis. His parents were Russian Jews. After demonstrating perfect pitch on a toy xylophone in kindergarten, Janis studied with Abraham Litow until he was 8 years old. Byron moved to New York with his mother and sister in 1936 to study with Josef and Rosina Lhévinne, and a year later, he began studying with their associate, Adele Marcus, who would remain his teacher for six years. When Marcus moved to Dallas in 1941, Yanks followed her there to continue his piano studies. He remained in Texas for three years, attending Woodrow Wilson High School. Byron Yanks made his recital debut in 1937 at the Carnegie Music Hall in Pittsburgh, and a year later, his musical sponsor, Samuel Chotzinoff, persuaded him to change his name to Byron Jannes; he would later change the spelling to Janis.

After attending one of Janis' concerts in Pittsburgh in 1944, at which he played Rachmaninoff's Concerto No. 2, Vladimir Horowitz offered to take the fifteen-year-old on as his first pupil. Janis studied with Horowitz from 1944 until 1948. Horowitz had advised Janis to concertize to build self-confidence and stage presence, so he postponed his successful Carnegie Hall debut until 1948.

Janis was also a composer. He wrote music for musical theater, including the score for a 1993 Off-Broadway adaptation of The Hunchback of Notre-Dame, for television shows, and in collaboration on several pieces with Cy Coleman.

In 1967, Janis accidentally unearthed what The New York Times called "That rarest of all musical items...", two previously unknown manuscripts of published Chopin waltzes (Op. 18 and Op. 70, No. 1) at the Château de Thoiry in France. Several years later, Janis found the same two waltzes in different versions at Yale University. These manuscripts were published together in the 1978 book The Most Dramatic Musical Discovery of the Age.

In 1973, Janis developed severe arthritis in both hands and wrists. In 1985, he talked about his difficulties in public for the first time and became the First Ambassador for the Arthritis Foundation. In June 2012, he was presented with a Lifetime Achievement Award for his work in Arthritis Advocacy.

Janis and his wife, Maria Cooper, daughter of screen actor Gary Cooper, wrote his autobiography Chopin and Beyond: My Extraordinary Life in Music and the Paranormal, which was released in 2010. Sony also released an eleven-CD set in 2011 which reissued the LPs he made for RCA during the 1950s and 1960s. In the DVD A Voyage With Byron Janis, he hosts a musical journey through Chopin's life. In 2016, it was reported that Martin Scorsese was developing a Byron Janis biopic for Paramount Pictures from a script by Peter Glanz, adapted from Janis' autobiography. Likewise, in 2023 Mercury Records reissued all of Janis' recordings (issued and never-before-released) for that label in a 9-CD set, Byron Janis - The Mercury Masters.

Janis died at a hospital in Manhattan, New York, on March 14, 2024, at the age of 95.

== Honors ==
Janis received several awards and honors including:

- Commander of the French Légion d'Honneur for Arts and Letters
- Grand Prix du Disque
- Stanford Fellowship, the highest honor of Yale University
- Distinguished Pennsylvania Artist Award

He received an honorary doctorate at Trinity College and the gold medal from the French Society for the Encouragement of Progress, the first musician to receive this honor since its inception in 1906. He was invited six times by four sitting Presidents to perform at the White House and was written into the Congressional Record of both the Senate and the House of Representatives, honoring him as "a musician, a diplomat and an inspiration." He was featured in the PBS documentary, by Emmy-award-winning producer Peter Rosen, The Byron Janis Story, which highlighted his struggles with arthritis.

== Sources ==
- Ardoin, John, Great Pianists of the 20th Century, Philips, 1999, Set I on Byron Janis
- Chesnut, Daniel Lawrence. "One Of My Favorite Artists Vladimir Samoylovych Horowitz". Artists Are The Breath Of Creation
- Conley, Mikaela (4 April 2011). "Byron Janis: World Renown Pianist Despite Pain". ABC News.
- Pula, James S. (22 December 2010). The Polish American Encyclopedia. McFarland. pp. 201–202. ISBN 978-0-7864-6222-3.
- Siek, Stephen (10 November 2016). "Janis, Byron". A Dictionary for the Modern Pianist. Rowman & Littlefield. p. 82. ISBN 978-0-8108-8880-7.
