= Ugo Betti =

Italian judge and author

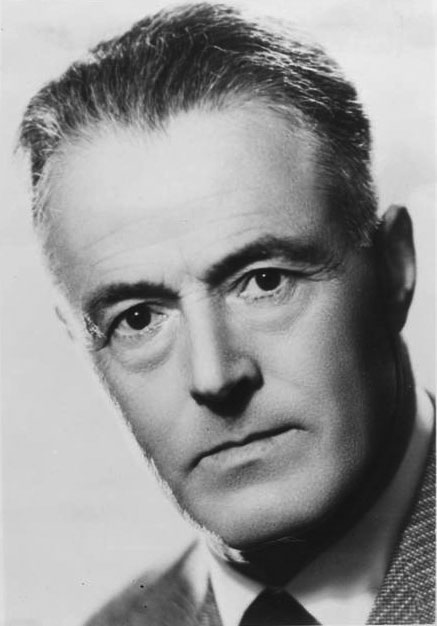
Ugo Betti

Ugo Betti (4 February 1892 in Camerino – 9 June 1953 in Rome) was an Italian judge, better known as an author, who is considered by many the greatest Italian playwright next to Pirandello.

== Biography ==
Betti studied law in Parma at the time when World War I broke out, and he volunteered as a soldier. After the war he finished his studies and became a judge. Writing in his spare time, he published his first collections of poems in 1922. These, titled Il re pensieroso (The Thoughtful King), were written while he was in German captivity from 1917 to 18. La Padrona, his first play, was first performed in 1927, and the play's success made him devote himself entirely to the theatre. In 1931 he moved from Parma to Rome. In 1938 he was accused by the fascists of being a Jew and an anti-fascist. After World War II, he was accused of being a fascist, but was cleared of all charges. In his later years, he worked at the library of the Ministry of Justice.

Altogether he wrote 27 plays, the most highly regarded written in the final period of his career, from 1940 until his death. His works explore the nature of evil, the existential guilt experienced by his protagonists, and the theme of redemption. Sometimes referred to as "the Italian Kafka", the criminal investigation is a characteristic motif in his plays. In The Inquiry, the procedure moves gradually from the realistic to the metaphysical level, without it ever being clearly revealed what the object of the investigation is. His best-known play is probably Corruzione al Palazzo di Giustizia (Corruption in the Palace of Justice). In it, an investigation into the possibility of corruption in the judiciary implicates more and more people, until the investigator himself is driven to address his own culpability.

== Works ==
- Il re pensieroso (The Thoughtful King, 1922)
- La Padrona (The Mistress of the House, 1926)
- L'isola meravigliosa (1929)
- Il diluvia (1931)
- Una bella domenica di settembre (1935)
- I nostri sogni (1936)
- Frana allo scalo nord (Landslide at the North Station, 1936)
- Il paese delle vacanze (Summertime, 1937)
- Favola di Natale (1937)
- Il cacciatore di anitre (The Duck Hunter, 1940)
- Il diluvio (The Flood, 1943)
- Spiritismo nell'antica casa (Spirit-Raising in the Old House, 1944)
- Corruzione al Palazzo di Giustizia (Corruption in the Palace of Justice, 1944-1945)
- Delitto all'isola delle capre (Crime on Goat-Island, 1946)
- Ispezione (The Inquiry, 1947)
- Aque turbate (Troubled Waters, 1948)
- La regina e lgli insorti (The Queen and the Rebels, 1949)
- Il giocatore (The Gambler, 1950)
- L'aiuola bruciata (The Burnt Flowerbed, 1952)
- La Fuggitiva (The Fugitive, 1953)

== Selected filmography ==
- A Woman Has Fallen (1941)
- The Woman of Sin (1942)
- Fourth Page (1942)
- Yellow Hell (1942)
- The Adulteress (1946)
- Biraghin (1946)

== Texts available in English ==
- Three Plays. Edited by Gino Rizzo (New York: Hill and Wang, 1966). Includes The Inquiry, Goat Island, and The Gambler.
- Three Plays. Translated by Henry Reed. (New York: Grove Press, 1958). Includes The Queen and the Rebels, Summertime, and The Burnt Flowerbed.
- Three Plays on Justice. Translated by G. H. McWilliam. (San Francisco: Chandler Publishing, 1964). Includes Landslide, Struggle Till Dawn, and The Fugitive.

== See also ==
- Passionate Summer, a film based on Goat Island
