= Music Canada (TV program) =

Canadian music television miniseries

- Genre: Performing arts
- Country of origin: Canada
- Original language: English
- No. of seasons: 1
- No. of episodes: 8

Production
- Running time: 60–90 minutes

Original release
- Network: CBC Television
- Release: 19 October 1966 – 24 May 1967

Music Canada is a Canadian music television program that aired approximately monthly on CBC Television from 1966 to 1967.

== Premise ==
This program featured various special productions of music and dance, from classical to modern styles.

== Scheduling ==
The eight episodes of this hour-long program were broadcast on occasional Wednesdays at 9:30 p.m. (Eastern) from 19 October 1966 to 24 May 1967.

Music Canada returned to CBC Television in 1985 featuring a similar concept.

== Episodes ==
No.	Title	Directed by	Written by	Original release date	Ref.
1	"Prelude to Expo"	Unknown	Barry Callaghan	19 October 1966	
Prelude to Expo is a Montreal concert featuring the Oscar Peterson Trio, Marcel Carignan, Jean-Pierre Ferland, Pauline Julien, Gordon Lightfoot, Aldor Morin and Miriam Makeba. Jimmy Dale conducted the orchestra. The broadcast included Vincent Warren of Les Grands Ballets Canadiens with choreography by Suzanne Verdal. The Expo 67 site was seen in the background which was under construction at that time. Paddy Sampson produced this broadcast.
2	"Percy Faith: Off the Record"	Unknown	Unknown	2 November 1966	
Dedicated to the bandleader and composer, Percy Faith, the broadcast featured Elwood Glover's interviews with Faith and scenes of Faith's conducting work. Also performing here were Shirley Harmer (singer), Martine van Hamel (dancer) and the National Ballet of Canada's Kristine Sealander and Gunter Pick. Norman Campbell produced this broadcast and Grant Strate was the choreographer.
3	"A Program of Opera"	Unknown	Unknown	7 December 1966	
Quebec musicians such as Colette Boky, Joseph Rouleau, Robert Savoie and André Turp performed selections from four operas. Pierre Morin was producer.
4	"Beethoven's Ninth Symphony"	Unknown	Ludwig van Beethoven	4 January 1967	
Beethoven's Ninth Symphony was performed by the Toronto Symphony Orchestra (conducted by Seiji Ozawa), the Festival Singers of Toronto, the Mendelssohn Choir, joined by singers Donald Bell, Maureen Forrester, Lois Marshall and Léopold Simoneau. Franz Kraemer produced this episode on location at Toronto's Massey Hall.
5	"And Then We Wrote"	Norman Campbell	Written by : Stan Daniels; Choreography by : Don Gillies	8 February 1967	
"And Then We Wrote" aka "And The Music We Wrote", hosted by Max Ferguson, featured selections from Canadian opera, musicals and ballet. Various musicians were joined by dancers Jeremy Blanton and Veronica Tennant. Producer, Norman Campbell.
6	"The Thirties"	Unknown	Watson and Stan Daniels	22 February 1967	TBA
"The Thirties" featured host Patrick Watson narrated music selections concerning the Great Depression. The Mart Kenney Orchestra was joined by featured guest Norma Locke and various vocalists. Arrangement was handled by Jimmy Dale (music) and Billy Van (vocals). Paddy Sampson was the broadcast's producer.
7	"Rose Latulippe"	Unknown	Music by : Harry Freedman; Choreography by : Brian Macdonald	12 April 1967	
The ballet Rose Latulippe performed by the Royal Winnipeg Ballet, was a work created specially for the Canadian Centennial by Harry Freedman (composer) and Brian Macdonald (choreographer) and opened the previous year at the Stratford Festival. Pierre Morin produced this colour broadcast for a 90-minute time slot. Costumes and decoration were handled by Robert Prevost.
8	"Hello Delhi!"	Unknown	Unknown	24 May 1967	
Hosted by Gordie Tapp and featured world music.
