= Cariboo Country (TV series) =

Canadian television series

- Genre: Drama
- Created by: Paul St. Pierre
- Written by: Paul St. Pierre
- Starring: David Hughes; Lillian Carlson; Greg Davies; Alan Cherrier; Walter "Wally" Marsh; Ted Stidder; Lloyd Cartwright; Buck Kindt; Rae Brown; Jean Sandy; Nancy Sandy; Chief Dan George; Joseph Golland; Paul Stanley (Canadian actor)
- Theme music composer: Jack Dale (Canadian musician); Ricky Hyslop
- Country of origin: Canada
- Original language: English
- No. of seasons: 3
- No. of episodes: 32

Production
- Producers: Frank Goodship; Philip Keatley
- Production locations: Vancouver, British Columbia, Canada; Chilcotin Country, British Columbia, Canada
- Cinematography: John Seale (Canadian cinematographer); Kelly Duncan
- Camera setup: Single-camera
- Running time: 30 minutes

Original release
- Network: CBC
- Release: June 16, 1960 – 1966

Cariboo Country is a Canadian television drama series that aired on CBC Television between June 1960 and September 1960, then from 1964 to 1966. Scripts for the series were written by British Columbia journalist, playwright, and politician Paul St. Pierre (1923–2014).

== Plot ==
Cariboo Country deals with the rancher Smith, whose first name is never mentioned (Hughes), his wife Norah (Carlson), and their son Sherwood (Davies, Cherrier), as well as their neighbours in the Chilcotin region of British Columbia. Smith and his family struggle to operate their small ranch near the fictional town of Namko. Other featured characters included Namko storekeeper Arch MacGregor (Stidder); cattlemen Ken Larsen (Marsh) and "Frenchie" Bernard (Golland); and Indigenous Chilcotin people such as Ol' Antoine (Chief Dan George), Young Alexander (Charlie Louis), Sarah (Jean Sandy), and Phyllistine (Nancy Sandy).

== Production ==
Two 1958 anthology dramas from CBUT Vancouver served as prototypes or pilots for the series: "The Window at Namko" (Spectrum series) and "Justice on the Jawbone" (Vancouver Playbill series).

The first complete Cariboo Country series (1960) consisted of 13 episodes produced on video in the CBUT Vancouver studio and kinescoped for national distribution. They were broadcast on CBUT from June 16 to September 8, 1960. Episodes were directed by Frank Goodship, Philip Keatley, and Len Lauk.

The series returned in 1964, with a larger budget, and continued until 1966. This iteration of the series was produced on film, with location shooting in Richmond and in the Chilcotin. Philip Keatley (1929–2007) directed all 16 filmed episodes. The series was broadcast nationally on the CBC anthology series The Serial.

Two related programs were broadcast nationally in the Festival series. The first was an hour-long version combining parts 1 & 2 of "The Education of Phyllistine" (1965), which won a Canadian Film Award for best television film of the year. Its success led to the production of the standalone hour-long episode "How to Break a Quarterhorse" [sic], which was also broadcast on Festival (1966).

== Book and film adaptations ==
Starting in 1965, Paul St. Pierre adapted some of his Cariboo Country teleplays into novels. The episode "Boss of the Namko Drive" was adapted into a book of the same title for younger readers and high school English classes. The best-known novel adaptation is Breaking Smith's Quarter Horse (1966).

The latter novel was in turn adapted into a theatrical feature film by Walt Disney Productions, with its setting switched to the northwestern United States. Smith! (1969) starred Glenn Ford (Smith), Nancy Olson (Norah), Chief Dan George (Ol' Antoine), and Dean Jagger (Judge). Michael O'Herlihy directed the feature.

In 1983, St. Pierre published Smith and Other Events: Tales of the Chilcotin, a short story collection based on several of his Cariboo Country teleplays.
