= Centennial Performance =

Canadian television miniseries

- Genre: Music
- Country of origin: Canada
- Original languages: English; French
- No. of seasons: 1
- No. of episodes: 3

Production
- Production locations: Toronto; Montreal
- Running time: 60 minutes

Original release
- Network: CBC Television; Radio-Canada
- Release: 19 April – 15 November 1967

Centennial Performance is a Canadian television miniseries which aired on CBC Television's English and French networks in 1967.

== Premise ==
This series featured performances by winners of a performing arts scholarship sponsored by INCO for the Canadian Centennial. They were joined by an orchestra and prominent classical artists.

== Scheduling ==
The three-hour-long Centennial Performance episodes were broadcast in colour, each at 9:30 p.m. Eastern:

- 19 April 1967 Scholarship recipients Jacques Simard (Quebec City, oboe) and Irene Weiss (Calgary, piano) were featured with singer George London. Pierre Hétu conducted the Montreal Symphony Orchestra.
- 4 October 1967 Richard Gresko (Montreal, piano) and Martine van Hamel (Toronto, ballet) were the featured scholarship winners, joined by singer Maureen Forrester and ballet dancer Hazaros Surmejan. George Crum and Brian Priestman conducted the Toronto Symphony Orchestra.
- 15 November 1967 Scholarship winners Claude Corbeil (Montreal, bass) and Audrey Glass (Vancouver, soprano) were joined by Glenn Gould in Toronto and the Toronto Symphony Orchestra conducted by Vladimir Golschmann.
