= The Paper People =

1967 Canadian television film

- Written by: Timothy Findley
- Directed by: David Gardner
- Starring: Marc Strange; Marigold Charlesworth
- Music by: John Coulson
- Country of origin: Canada
- Original language: English

Production
- Producer: Ted Zarpas
- Cinematography: Ernest Kirkpatrick
- Editor: M. C. Manne
- Production company: CBC Television

Original release
- Release: 13 December 1967

The Paper People is a Canadian dramatic television film, directed by David Gardner and released in 1967. It is the first television film ever produced entirely in-house by CBC Television without an outside coproducer.

The film aired on 13 December 1967 as an episode of the anthology series Festival.

== Synopsis ==
The film centres on Jamie Taylor, an artist working on a project in which he builds papier-mâché models of people and then films the models being set on fire, and Janet Webb, a journalist profiling Jamie in a documentary.

== Cast ==
- Marc Strange as Jamie Taylor
- Marigold Charlesworth as Janet Webb
- Lucy Warner
- Kate Reid
- Brett Somers
- Hilary Vernon
- Robin Ward
- Sabina Maydelle
- Clifford Trevor
- Stevie Wise
- Ed McGibbon
- Adam Ludwig

== Production ==
The film was shot in the summer of 1967, in Toronto and Oakville, Ontario.

== Reception ==
The Paper People received mixed reviews, with Sheila Keiran of The Globe and Mail panning it as pretentious, arty and boring, while Lorne Parton of The Province called it one of the better films to be released in any format, television or theatrical, that year. The broadcast sparked some controversy, however, with some commentators stating that the Canadian Broadcasting Corporation should not be investing in films that would clearly only appeal to a limited audience.
