= Ronald Turini =

Canadian pianist (born 1934)

- Born: September 30, 1934 (age 91); Montreal, Canada
- Genre: Classical
- Occupation: Musician
- Instruments: Piano
- Labels: RCA, Sony Classical

Ronald Turini (born 30 September 1934) is a world renowned Canadian classical pianist.

Turini was the first Canadian artist to win prizes at the Ferruccio Busoni International Piano Competition and the Geneva International Music Competition, both in 1958, and the 1960 Queen Elisabeth Competition, where he was acclaimed by juror Emil Gilels. He was an acknowledged student of Vladimir Horowitz, and was known to be Horowitz' personally most highly regarded student.

Turini performed internationally with prominent orchestras such as the Leningrad Philharmonic, the Chicago Symphony Orchestra, the Philharmonia Orchestra of London, the London Philharmonic, the BBC Symphony Orchestra and the Royal Philharmonic Orchestra. He appeared with the Orchestre Lamoureux in Paris. Turini gave extended tours of many cities in Europe and the U.S. as soloist with the Montreal Symphony Orchestra, the Toronto Symphony Orchestra, the National Symphony Orchestra of Washington D.C., the San Antonio Symphony and the Melbourne Symphony Orchestra. Turini performed concertos with conductors such as Wilfrid Pelletier, Sir Adrian Boult, Charles Munch, Zubin Mehta, Seiji Ozawa, Rafael Frühbeck de Burgos, Jean Martinon, Walter Susskind, Mario Bernardi, Igor Markevitch, Franz-Paul Decker, Antal Doráti, Leonard Slatkin, Arthur Fiedler, Maxim Shostakovich, Robert Shaw, and many others.

He performed recitals in concert halls such as Carnegie Hall and Wigmore Hall. Turini was a consistent performer and it was said that he almost never received a negative review from a music critic.

Turini later accepted a professorship at University of Western Ontario and recorded chamber music with his colleagues at Western.

== Early life ==
Born in Montreal, Quebec, to an Italian-American father and a Danish-Canadian mother, Turini's father was an artist and his mother was a musician. His grandfather Giovanni Turini was a sculptor whose bust of Garibaldi, under whom he had served during the Italian war of unification, is a designated historical landmark in New York City's Washington Square.

Turini studied piano with his mother at a very young age and with Frank Hanson at the McGill Conservatory. At age nine he began studies at the Montreal Conservatory of Music where he was taught by Yvonne Hubert, Germaine Malépart and Isidor Philipp. Hubert was known for developing strong technical skills, and her students, besides Turini, included André Laplante, Janina Fialkowska, Louis Lortie, and Marc-André Hamelin. Turini made his debut as a soloist with the Montreal Symphony Orchestra under Wilfrid Pelletier at the age of ten during WWII. He graduated from the Conservatory at age 16 in 1950. For a couple of years he considered devoting himself to automobile engineering, but he finally decided on a career as a pianist. He retained a lifelong interest in high performance elite automobiles.

Turini entered the Mannes School of Music in 1953, where he studied with Isabelle Vengerova and Olga Stroumillo, who introduced him to Vladimir Horowitz. Horowitz, who accepted few pupils, was sufficiently impressed to accept Turini as a student. He would later remark that Turini possessed the most brilliant two-handed runs of any pianist. Horowitz became a major influence on Turini, who studied with him from 1956 through 1965. Turini's lessons with Horowitz could extend to three hours in length, if Horowitz became interested in the results. The great pianist acknowledged only Byron Janis, Gary Graffman, and Turini as his eminent students, and Turini was known to be Horowitz' personally most highly regarded student. Horowitz would later comment that Turini was not "pushy" enough in promoting himself and his own performing career. Horowitz assisted in obtaining Turini's management contract with Columbia Artists Management (CAMI).

== Career ==
=== Competitions and debut ===
In 1958, Turini was awarded second prize at the Ferruccio Busoni International Piano Competition in Bolzano, Italy. That same year, and along with Maurizio Pollini, he was unanimously awarded a second prize at the 1958 Geneva International Music Competition.

Turini was awarded second place at the 1960 edition of the Queen Elisabeth Competition in Brussels, Belgium. He performed the Schumann Piano Sonata No. 2 in G minor and the Liszt Piano Concerto No. 1 with the National Orchestra of Belgium conducted by Franz André. Following the Brussels competition, jury member Emil Gilels wired to Horowitz, "Congratulations, "Professor", your Turini is wonderful."

On 23 January 1961, Turini made his American debut recital at Carnegie Hall, playing sonatas by Schumann and Hindemith, etudes by Chopin and Scriabin, and pieces by Schumann, Chopin, Liszt, Mendelssohn, Ravel and Scarlatti. The audience included notable musicians such as Artur Rubinstein, Leonard Bernstein, Walter Toscanini, Rudolf Firkušný, and many pianists. Rubinstein was the first to congratulate Turini after the recital. The reception after the concert was hosted by Horowitz and his wife at their apartment. The next day, New York Times music critic Harold C. Schonberg characterized Turini as "resplendent", adding that "in addition to technical expertness, there was a quality of aristocracy to the performance." The positive critical reaction to his Carnegie Hall debut was consistent with Turini's subsequent career, and it was said that he almost never received a negative review from a music critic.

=== Montreal Symphony Orchestra, Toronto Symphony Orchestra and European tours ===
That same year of 1961, Turini performed the Schumann Piano Concerto with the Montreal Symphony Orchestra at Plateau Hall in Montreal under music director Zubin Mehta, receiving praise for his "placid sensitivity" as well as his "passion and power". In 1962, Turini participated in a major tour of Europe (Leningrad, Moscow, Vienna, Paris) with the Montreal Symphony Orchestra conducted by Zubin Mehta and also with soprano soloist Teresa Stratas, who sang arias from Verdi and Puccini operas. He performed the Rachmaninoff Rhapsody on a Theme of Paganini in Leningrad and Vienna and the Liszt Piano Concerto No. 1 in Moscow and Paris. Following the performances and a suddenly-arranged recital in Moscow, Soviet pianist Emil Gilels described Turini as "a great artist". The Vienna Kurier 7 May 1962 music review by Herbert Schneiber stated that in the Rachmaninoff work Turini's "manner of playing is full of charm, stylish shades and poetical atmosphere." His performance of the Liszt concerto in Paris was described in Le Figaro as "literally dazzling, of exceptional taste, finesse, and brilliance."

Turini contracted to return to the Soviet Union the following season. In the 1962/1963 season he performed the Rachmaninoff Piano Concerto No. 3 with the Leningrad Philharmonic, the foremost orchestra in the Soviet Union, the audience requesting further encores until Turini could no longer continue. He performed in Moscow as soloist with the Moscow State Symphony Orchestra and again in Leningrad in 1965, including a notable recital.

In 1966, he performed the Brahms Piano Concerto No. 2 in Brussels, Belgium with Mehta and the Montreal Symphony Orchestra, and also toured throughout France and Switzerland with this work and the orchestra. He also performed in Montreal as soloist with the Montreal Symphony Orchestra in the seasons of 1953, 1957, 1958, 1961, 1969 performing the Prokofiev Piano Concerto No. 3 conducted by Charles Munch, in August 1972 performing both the Liszt Piano Concerto No. 1 and the Tchaikovsky Piano Concerto No. 1 as part of the same concert, 1974 in the Rachmaninoff Piano Concerto No. 3 and in Ottawa's National Arts Centre the Saint-Saens Piano Concerto No. 2 with conductor Franz-Paul Decker. He toured with the Montreal Symphony Orchestra in 1976 performing the Liszt Piano Concerto No. 1 with Rafael Frühbeck de Burgos conducting, beginning in Carnegie Hall, N.Y. and then in France and Britain (including venues in Paris, London, and Edinburgh) and Prague, Czechoslovakia. Turini also appeared as soloist with the Montreal Symphony Orchestra in 1979, performing the Grieg Piano Concerto at Montreal's Place des Arts, acclaimed by critic Eric McLean as a "splendid performance".

In 1963, Turini toured cities in both the U.S. and Canada including Detroit and New York City with the Toronto Symphony Orchestra conducted by Walter Susskind performing the Liszt Piano Concerto No. 1. In 1968 he achieved an acclaimed performance of the Rachmaninoff Third Piano Concerto with the Toronto Symphony Orchestra conducted by Otto-Werner Mueller. Of this performance, one music writer stated that "..rapid passagework is dispatched with apparent ease, with masterful highlighting of key motifs and voices that are often overlooked by pianists who emphasize the virtuosic aspects of these passages. His left hand voicing is incredible." In 1972 he was again soloist with the Toronto Symphony Orchestra conducted by Seiji Ozawa, the former music director of the orchestra.

In Britain, Turini was soloist with the Philharmonia Orchestra of London conducted by Günther Wich in 1966 performing the Rachmaninoff Piano Concerto No. 3. The next year he appeared with the London Philharmonic Orchestra conducted by Sir Adrian Boult at the Royal Albert Hall performing the Rachmaninoff Rhapsody on a Theme of Paganini. In 1974, Turini gave a live recital broadcast on BBC Radio. In that same season, Turini was soloist with the BBC Symphony Orchestra in two live concerts, one of which was broadcast on the full BBC television network. He also appeared in 1974 with both the Royal Philharmonic Orchestra conducted by Jean Martinon with the Tchaikovsky Piano Concerto No. 1 and the Bournemouth Symphony Orchestra conducted by Volker Wangenheim performing the Beethoven Piano Concerto No. 3 in three different locations. He was soloist with the Orchestre Lamoureux in Paris.

Following his Carnegie Hall debut, Turini performed solo recitals both in North America and abroad, including 1965 recitals at Wigmore Hall in London, UK and the Amsterdam Concertgebouw hall. He returned to Carnegie Hall in 1964 and again in 1967. Of the 1967 Carnegie Hall recital, reviewer Howard Klein of the New York Times stated that in Turini's performance "...there is poetry and drive as well as literalness in his makeup, and the balance of classical severity with magical tone painting made this recital a thorough pleasure" and that "any pretext to get this epicurean young pianist to play [at Carnegie Hall] again would be welcome". He made his Boston debut in 1969 for the Peabody Mason Concert series, returning in 1971. In 1965, Turini made a recital disc for CBC broadcast.

In 1967, Turini toured in Canada for the Canadian Centennial celebrations, including in his recital programs the Variations for piano of prominent Canadian composer Jacques Hétu. Turini performed at Expo 67 in Montreal at the Canadian pavilion in both a solo recital, which was broadcast live across Canada by CBC Radio, including works of J. S. Bach, the Jacques Hétu Variations for Piano, a Rachmaninoff Études-Tableaux and three Preludes, two works of Liszt, and encores of works of Chopin and Scriabin, and as soloist with the Montreal Symphony Orchestra conducted by Wilfred Pelletier. The symphony performance was broadcast internationally on the Ed Sullivan Show by the CBS television network, and was rebroadcast on CBS during the summer. Also on the orchestral program was soprano Birgit Nilsson singing "In Questa Reggia" from Puccini's Turandot. Variety review stated that "Filling the stage was the Montreal Symphony conducted by Wilfrid Pelletier and backing in succession, Met soprano Birgit Nilsson in a number from Puccini's Turandot and Canadian pianist Ronald Turini in a Rachmaninoff concerto for a splendid 1-2 longhair punch."

In 1969 he performed the Schumann Piano Concerto at the inaugural concert of the National Arts Centre Orchestra in Ottawa with Mario Bernardi conducting in a national radio broadcast on the Canadian Broadcasting Corporation.

In 1968 he performed the Tchaikovsky Piano Concerto No. 1 with the Buenos Aires Philharmonic conducted by Igor Markevitch, former music director of the Montreal Symphony Orchestra, with whom Turini had collaborated in Montreal. Turini performed the Ginastera Piano Sonata No. 1 in a Canadian Broadcasting Corporation broadcast in 1969.

Turini made three tours of Russia, three tours of South America, and two tours of Japan.

=== Tours with orchestras in U.S. ===
In 1963, Turini participated in his first tour of cities in the U.S. with the Toronto Symphony Orchestra conducted by Walter Susskind, with concerts in Detroit, Buffalo, and New York City among others performing the Liszt Piano Concerto No. 1.

Turini performed as soloist with U.S. orchestras such as the Houston Symphony in 1965 with Georges Tzipine as conductor, performing Rachmaninoff's Rhapsody on a Theme of Paganini. The reviewer for the Houston Post described Turini's style as "a prodigious technique in combination with a refinement of touch and a delicacy of musical insight", "the music he makes is...alive, singing, and utterly beautiful." He also made many appearances with the National Symphony Orchestra of Washington D.C. in 1968 performing the Rachmaninoff Piano Concerto No. 3 and the Tchaikovsky Piano Concerto No. 1 in an extended tour of 26 concerts in U.S. cities, including both Washington D.C. and at Philharmonic Hall in the Lincoln Center in New York City. In the Lincoln Center concert he performed the Rachmaninoff Piano Concerto No. 3 with Arthur Fiedler conducting. He again appeared with the National Symphony Orchestra in Washington D.C. in the 1969-70 season with music director Antal Doráti conducting and in 1971 with conductor Maxim Shostakovich in the Prokofiev Piano Concerto No. 3.

Turini performed as soloist with the Melbourne Symphony Orchestra in its 1971 tour of both the U.S. and Canada. In November Turini and the Melbourne Symphony conducted by Willem van Otterloo performed the Rachmaninoff Rhapsody on a Theme of Paganini in Carnegie Hall in New York City. A Musical America review praised Turini's "fabulous articulation, elegant finish, and the ability to play clearly at top speed" in a "songfully lyric, amply expansive treatment". Turini appeared in 1970 with the San Antonio Symphony conducted by Carlos Surinach performing the Rachmaninoff Piano Concerto No. 2. He joined with the orchestra again in 1971/1972 on an extended tour of the largest U.S. cities in the southwest and on the west coast.

Turini was soloist with the Atlanta Symphony Orchestra in 1967 with conductor Milton Katims and again in April 1973 with music director Robert Shaw in three performances of the Tchaikovsky Piano Concerto No. 1. In 1975 Turini was soloist with the Chicago Symphony Orchestra conducted by Leonard Slatkin in the Tchaikovsky Piano Concerto No. 1 at Chicago's Symphony Center. In several seasons beginning in 1961, he had performed solo recitals at the Chicago Symphony Center under the auspices of the Chicago Symphony Orchestra with acclaimed results, and had performed a piano concerto with Chicago's Grant Park Symphony Orchestra, at Millennium Park in downtown Chicago near Symphony Center during the summer festival.

=== Later tours ===
He appeared in Canada with the Winnipeg Symphony Orchestra, the Vancouver Symphony Orchestra in 1971 performing the Chopin Piano Concerto No. 1, and the Edmonton Symphony Orchestra in 1975 performing the Rachmaninoff Piano Concerto No.2. In 1976 during the Montreal XXI Olympic Games, Turini and the Orford String Quartet performed the Schumann Piano Quintet Op. 44 at the Place des Arts. In 1977 Turini performed the Schumann Piano Concerto with the Orchestre Symphonique de Québec in Quebec City. In 1978 he performed with the Winnipeg Symphony Orchestra conducted by Piero Gamba in Ottawa at the National Arts Centre in the Rachmaninoff Rhapsody on a Theme of Paganini and the Grieg Piano Concerto. In 1984 Turini performed the Liszt Piano Concerto No. 1 with the Vancouver Symphony Orchestra.

In 1985, Turini performed the Schumann Piano Quartet Op. 47 with members of the National Arts Centre Orchestra in Ottawa at the National Arts Centre. In 1986 Turini performed a recital in Montreal featuring virtuoso piano transcriptions of Verdi, Schubert, Bach and Schumann by Franz Liszt. The concert was broadcast nationally on the Canadian Broadcasting Corporation radio network. In 1995, he performed the Tchaikovsky Piano Concerto No. 1 with the Thunder Bay Symphony Orchestra conducted by Steven Lipsitt. In 2011, Turini toured with the Lafayette String Quartet performing the Brahms Piano Quintet in F Minor.

He also performed widely over many years in international tours with violinist Ida Haendel in the violin sonata literature, including violin/piano sonatas of Brahms and Franck.

=== University position ===
Turini had given an acclaimed recital at University of Western Ontario in London, Ontario, Canada in 1971. Turini reportedly disliked the continuous travel and hotels of international concert life, and he began teaching at Western in 1975, where he was Professor of Piano and later Professor Emeritus of piano performance until his retirement in 2008. Among his many successful students were Angela Park of Piano Six, who later became a piano professor at Western, and Margaret Fox of Bermuda.

Turini's Faculty of Music colleagues at Western included such prominent performing artists as cellist Tsuyoshi Tsutsumi, violinist Steven Staryk, violist Gerald Stanik, clarinetist Jerome Summers, pianist Dr. Damjana Bratuž, pianist Arthur Rowe, and pianist Bruce Vogt. Music historian and musicologist Dr. Philip Downs was also a member of the Faculty of Music at Western from 1969 to 2014.

In January 1979, Turini performed the Brahms Piano Concerto No. 2 with the London Symphony Orchestra of London, Ontario, Canada conducted by music director Clifford Evens in Centennial Hall in London Ontario. In later seasons he performed the Chopin Piano Concerto No. 1 and the Beethoven Piano Concerto No. 3 with the orchestra (then known as Orchestra London), the latter in 1997. In 2000, Turini performed the Mozart Piano Concerto No. 21 with the London Community Orchestra of London, Ontario conducted by Len Ingrao at the Aeolian Hall in London, Ontario.

Turini was a founding member of Quartet Canada, together with his fellow Faculty of Music colleagues at University of Western Ontario, Steven Staryk, Tsuyoshi Tsutsumi, and Gerald Stanick. Together they performed and recorded the piano quartets of many composers, including all three of the Brahms piano quartets. Having recorded the five Beethoven sonatas for cello and piano together for CBS/Sony Records in 1980, Turini and Tsutsumi performed the Beethoven Sonata for Cello and Piano No. 3 in a national radio broadcast for the Canadian Broadcasting Corporation. In 1982, Turini and Tsutsumi performed in Ottawa at the invitation of the Japanese Ambassador to Canada a recital program which included cello/piano sonatas of Bach, Beethoven, and Rachmaninoff. In 1985 Turini and cellist Tsuyoshi Tsutsumi performed the world premiere of the Sonata No. 2 for Cello and Piano of André Prévost. In July 1991, Turini and Tsutsumi performed a duo recital at the University of Indiana in Bloomington, Indiana where Tsutsumi had become Professor of Cello. They performed the Beethoven Cello and Piano Sonata Op. 69, the Debussy Sonata for Cello and Piano, and the Rachmaninoff Cello and Piano Sonata in g minor, the latter in a highly acclaimed performance. In 2003, Turini and Tsutsumi performed a Canadian Broadcasting Corporation national broadcast recital of cello/piano sonatas of Borodin and Shostakovich.

=== Recordings ===
Turini live performance recordings exist of the Liszt Piano Concerto No. 1 from the 1960 Queen Elisabeth Competition with the National Orchestra of Belgium and the Rachmaninoff Piano Concerto No. 3 with the Toronto Symphony Orchestra in 1968.

Turini's 1961 Carnegie Hall recital makes up discs 10 and 11 of a 43-disc boxed set of "Great Moments at Carnegie Hall", released in 2016 by Sony Classical, the other solo piano recitals being those of Sviatoslav Richter (1960), Arthur Rubinstein (1961), Vladimir Horowitz (1965), Jorge Bolet (1974), Rudolf Serkin (1977), Lazar Berman (1979), Vladimir Feltsman (1987), Evgeny Kissin (1990), and more recently Yu Kosuge (2005), and Denis Matsuev (2007).

Turini and Malcolm Frager (who had finished first in the 1960 Queen Elisabeth Competition) both signed recording contracts with RCA. However, RCA made only a few recordings with the two pianists, and only piano recital discs. RCA did not arrange to record any piano concertos with them (apart from Frager in the Prokofiev No. 2). Turini's most central piano concertos had been designated by RCA to be recorded with Van Cliburn and RCA did not make further recordings of those concertos with Turini. Live recordings preserve Turini's versions of the Rachmaninoff No. 3 and Liszt No. 1 concertos performed with imagination and excitement in contrast to the comparatively prosaic concerto recordings produced by RCA without Turini. Gary Graffman and Byron Janis, Horowitz' other prominent students, both left the RCA roster of pianists in 1960 after Cliburn had emerged as a national hero following his triumphant victory in the Moscow competition against a field of regional pianists. Some of Frager's live broadcasts of Mozart and Beethoven concertos would be privately recorded in murky sound and released in the 1970s on minor European labels. Agustin Anievas, who had received the Tenth Prize in the 1960 Queen Elisabeth Competition, contracted to record piano concertos for the British label EMI in the 1960s. However, Turini did not contract to record for the major British or European record companies. Horowitz would comment some years later that "management in America does not take care of [Turini] enough...he deserves a better place than he has."

Gramophone Magazine, reviewing the 1965 release of his 1961 (following his Carnegie Hall debut) RCA Red Seal recital recording "Piano Music Of Schumann, Liszt, Hindemith, Scriabin", lauded Turini as "a pianist of uncommon ability" with a "range of colour... which straightaway marks him out from so many pianists". In 1968, Turini was nominated for a Grammy Award for Best Chamber Music Performance, for his recording of the Hindemith Sonata for Viola and Piano with Walter Trampler, released as RCA Victor Red Seal LSC 3012. In July 1969 at the Orford Arts Centre at Mount Orford in Quebec, Turini recorded the Schumann Piano Quintet Op. 44 with the Orford String Quartet, released as RCA Victor LSC-3137. In 1972 Turini's recording of piano works of Schubert, Ginastera, and Rachmaninoff was released as RCA LSC-3145. The reviewer for the Montreal Gazette stated that "Turini belongs in the front rank of the world's tiny group of top pianists...when you listen to this recording, relax, because you are listening to the best."

Turini was a founding member of Quartet Canada, together with his fellow Faculty of Music colleagues at University of Western Ontario, recording many piano quartets. In 1980 he recorded the complete Beethoven works for cello and piano together with his colleague and frequent performing partner at University of Western Ontario, the renowned cellist Tsuyoshi Tsutsumi, which were distributed world wide by CBS/Sony Records. The esteemed classical music critic Tully Potter described the recording of Op. 69 in this set as follows in a 2019 review, "My all-time choice so far is Tsuyoshi Tsutsumi and Ronald Turini in their outstanding Sony set which includes the three lots of Variations".

In 1993, Turini recorded the Brahms Sonata for Clarinet and Piano Op. 120 no. 1 with clarinetist Jerome Summers, his colleague at University of Western Ontario. Turini and Summers also recorded the Sonata in D Major for Clarinet in A and Piano by Nino Rota, the famous composer of cinema scores.

== Sources ==
- Biography from the Encyclopedia of Music in Canada
- Ronald Turini-Past Concert Programs and Reviews (still adding)
