= Ruth Budd =

Canadian bassist (1924–2021)

Ruth June Budd
- Born: June 20, 1924; Winnipeg, Manitoba, Canada
- Died: June 30, 2021 (aged 97)
- Education: British Columbia School of Pharmacy and Science; Toronto Conservatory of Music; University of Toronto
- Occupation: bassist
- Known for: Member of the Symphony Six

Ruth June Budd (June 20, 1924 – June 30, 2021) was a Canadian bassist. She became Canada's first professional female bassist when she joined the Toronto Symphony Orchestra in 1947. She was also known as a member of the Symphony Six, a group of six musicians under contract to the Toronto orchestra who were denied entry to the United States for a concert tour under suspicion of leftist activities.

== Early life and education ==
Ruth Budd was born in Winnipeg to Jack Ross (born in Ukraine) and Olive (née Barrett, born in Winnipeg. Her father was a professional photographer and retoucher. Ruth spent 1 year at the British Columbia School of Pharmacy and Science, at the Toronto Conservatory of Music and at the Faculty of Music at the University of Toronto. She played violin at school level, and took mandolin lessons with the Ukrainian community in Winnipeg. Ruth's father was an accomplished photographer and retoucher, and both parents valued music. Her family was poor, and the Ukrainian Labour temple offered free mandolin lessons. This was an interest that she returned to later in life. Ruth also took acrobatics as a child and performed in Winnipeg's vaudeville.

== Career ==
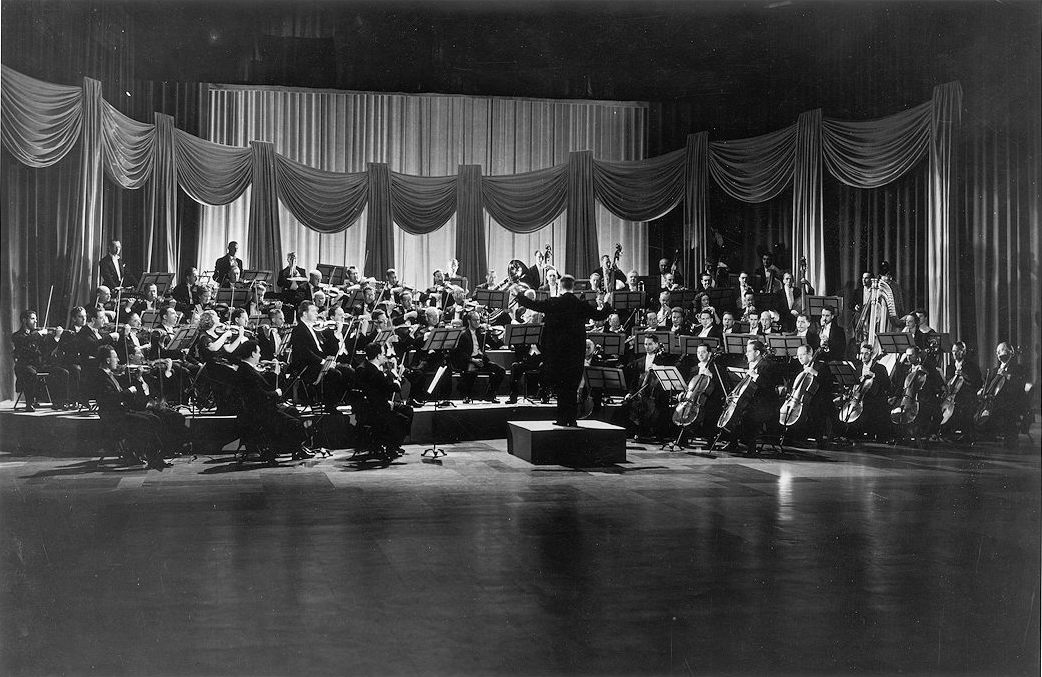
Sir Ernest MacMillan conducting the Toronto Symphony Orchestra, 1947

Budd played double bass with the Vancouver Symphony Orchestra from 1944 to 1946. She joined the Toronto Symphony Orchestra in 1947, becoming Canada's first professional female bassist.

=== Symphony Six ===
In November 1951 the Toronto Symphony Orchestra was invited to participate in the "Major Symphony Series" in Detroit, its first appearance in the United States, alongside major US orchestras from Boston, Chicago, Cleveland, and Philadelphia. In keeping with US immigration laws, the orchestra submitted its list of members for clearance. Seven musicians were not given clearance; this was later pared down to six: Budd, Dirk Keetbaas, William Kuinka, Abe Mannheim, John Moskalyk, and Steven Staryk (later known as the Symphony Six), who were denied access to the United States under suspicion of leftist activities. The performers had associated openly with communist or communist front organizations in the vein of artistic collaboration, but denied the charges of political involvement. Budd later said in an interview that she had been a member of a left-wing youth group. Ruth told the story that she overheard people talking about her, "She must be a communist...she reads a lot!" At the end of the season the orchestra did not renew its contracts with these musicians. This created a controversy in Canada, partly due to the orchestra management not supporting their artists.

=== Later career ===
After her contract was not renewed in 1952, Budd went on to play with the Halifax Symphony Orchestra, the Hart House Orchestra, the CBC Symphony Orchestra, and the orchestras of the Canadian Opera Company, the National Ballet of Canada, and the Stratford Festival. In 1964 she was rehired by the Toronto Symphony Orchestra and performed as a double bassist until 1989, becoming "one of the most beloved members of the orchestra".

Ruth had a musical duo, first with Abe Galper, a clarinetist in the TSO, and later, with her son Kevin. Over several decades, it is estimated that she gave over 300 music demonstrations in Toronto area schools under the auspices of the Toronto Symphony Education programs. Ruth toured the Eastern Arctic with Kevin, performing dozens of music demonstrations in school, community centres and libraries there.

In 1993 Budd founded the Toronto Senior Strings. She was also the founding chairperson of the Organization of Canadian Symphony Musicians.

== Hobbies and Interests ==
Ruth was an accomplished potter, with a kickwheel and a kiln in her basement. She was also a member of the Toronto Mandolin Orchestra for several decades. She loved Northwest coast carving and art and was a dedicated follower of Emily Carr, having read everything she wrote.

In her retirement years, she spent 17 years at Christie Gardens in Toronto, where she started a choir, enriching the lives of many residents.

== Awards ==
Budd received the YWCA Women of Distinction Award for Arts in 1983.

== Bibliography ==
- Colombo, John Robert (2001). 1000 Questions About Canada: Places, People, Things and Ideas, A Question-and-Answer Book on Canadian Facts and Culture. Dundurn. ISBN 978-1-4597-1820-3.
- Holmes, Gillian (1999). Who's Who of Canadian Women, 1999-2000. University of Toronto Press. ISBN 0920966551.
- Pitman, Walter (2006). Music Makers: The Lives of Harry Freedman & Mary Morrison. Dundurn. ISBN 978-1-55002-589-7.
- Sleeman, Elizabeth (2001). The International Who's Who of Women 2002. Psychology Press. ISBN 1857431227.
- Warren, Richard S. (2002). Begins with the Oboe: A History of the Toronto Symphony Orchestra. University of Toronto Press. ISBN 0802035884.
