= Tsuyoshi Tsutsumi =

Japanese cellist (born 1942)

Tsuyoshi Tsutsumi 堤剛
- Born: July 28, 1942 (age 84); Tokyo, Japan
- Genre: Classical
- Occupation: Musician
- Instrument: Cello
- Years active: 1954-present
- Label: Sony Classical
- Spouse: Haru Tsutsumi (1978-present)

Tsuyoshi Tsutsumi (堤剛, Tsutsumi Tsuyoshi) (born July 28, 1942 in Tokyo) is a Japanese cellist. In an international career which began in 1954, Tsutsumi has performed and recorded all of the principal standard works in the cello repertoire, both solo and concerto.

He has appeared as soloist with the Vienna Philharmonic Orchestra, the Royal Concertgebouw Orchestra of Amsterdam, the Leipzig Gewandhaus Orchestra, the London Symphony Orchestra, the Chicago Symphony Orchestra, the Boston Symphony Orchestra, and the National Symphony Orchestra of Washington D.C..

Tsutsumi won first prize at the Pablo Casals International Cello Competition in 1963 at Budapest. Tsutsumi was awarded the Artist Diploma in Instrumental Performance at Indiana University in 1965.

He was Visiting Professor and Resident Artist at University of Western Ontario from 1967 to 1984 and Professor of Cello at Indiana University from 1988 to 2006. He was President of Toho Gakuen School of Music from 2004 to 2014.

== Education ==
Tsutsumi’s father was a versatile player of the violin, viola and cello and also played double bass in the Tokyo Radio Philharmonic. His father taught all three instruments in local schools. Tsuyoshi began the violin at the age of six, but changed to cello when he saw a half-size cello being demonstrated to his father by a dealer. He started to study music under the tutorship of Hideo Saito, founder of the Toho Gakuen School of Music in Chōfu, Tokyo from where he would graduate. Tsutsumi made his debut as cellist when he was 12 years old performing the Saint-Saens Cello Concerto No. 1 with the Tokyo Philharmonic and at 18 he gave his first concert tour as soloist with the NHK Symphony Orchestra throughout India, Russia and Europe.

He was granted a Fulbright Scholarship to study at Indiana University with János Starker commencing in 1961. He was awarded the Artist Diploma in Instrumental Performance at Indiana University in 1965. Tsutsumi was appointed as Assistant to Starker at Indiana University beginning in 1963.

== Competitions ==
Tsutsumi won first prize at the Pablo Casals International Cello Competition in 1963 at Budapest. He also won first prize at the ARD International Music Competition in Munich for cello that same year.

== Performance history ==
Tsutsumi has performed as soloist with orchestras such as the Vienna Philharmonic Orchestra, the Royal Concertgebouw Orchestra of Amsterdam, the Leipzig Gewandhaus Orchestra, the London Symphony Orchestra, the Chicago Symphony Orchestra, the Boston Symphony Orchestra, the National Symphony Orchestra of Washington D.C., the Munich Philharmonic, the ORTF or Orchestre National de France, Berlin Radio Symphony Orchestra, Netherlands Chamber Orchestra, the Rotterdam Philharmonic, the Philharmonia Orchestra of London, the Royal Liverpool Philharmonic, the English Chamber Orchestra, the Czech Philharmonic, the Warsaw Philharmonic, the Accademia Nazionale di Santa Cecilia of Rome, the Indianapolis Symphony, the Toronto Symphony Orchestra, the Vancouver Symphony Orchestra, the National Arts Centre Orchestra of Ottawa, the NHK Symphony Orchestra, among many others. He participated in festivals such as the Algoma Fall, Banff, Guelph Spring, Ontario Place, and Stratford in Canada, and the Ravinia in the United States.

He performed with conductors such as Seiji Ozawa (with whom he recorded the cello solo in Tchaikovsky's Swan Lake suite), Giuseppe Sinopoli, Mstislav Rostropovich, Valery Gergiev, Zdeněk Košler (with whom he recorded the Dvořák Cello Concerto with the Czech Philharmonic Orchestra for CBS/Sony Records), Eiji Oue, José-Luis Garcia (with whom he recorded the Haydn Cello Concertos with the English Chamber Orchestra for Sony Records). Tsutsumi collaborated with such musicians as Gervase de Peyer, Ronald Turini (with whom he recorded the complete Beethoven works for cello and piano for CBS/Sony Records), Emanuel Ax, Yo-Yo Ma, Nobuko Imai, Steven Staryk, Adele Marcus, James Campbell, Wolfgang Sawallisch (with whom he recorded the two Brahms sonatas for cello and piano for CBS/Sony Records), and many others.

=== Live Performance History ===
In September 1967, Tsutsumi performed the Saint-Saens Cello Concerto No. 1 with the London Symphony Orchestra (later known as Orchestra London) in London, Ontario, Canada conducted by music director Martin Boundy. Tsutsumi became a member of the Faculty of Music at University of Western Ontario in London as Visiting Professor and Resident Artist that same year.

On 10 December 1968, Tsutsumi performed a duo recital with Western piano professor, and former fellow graduate student at Indiana University, Damjana Bratuž in the Sherwood Building at the University of Western Ontario. Included in the recital were cello and keyboard sonatas by J. S. Bach, Antonio Vivaldi, and Haydn. Tsutsumi and Bratuž performed the composer's transcription for cello and piano of Bartók's First Rhapsody on 25 October 1970 at Talbot Theatre, University of Western Ontario.

On 24 October 1974, Tsutsumi appeared with a Japanese combined orchestra which included the Toho Gakuen School of Music Orchestra and members of the Japan Philharmonic with conductor Seiji Ozawa and violist Nobuko Imai in a world-wide telecast (carried on the PBS television network in the U.S.) from the United Nations headquarters building in New York City. In the concert, he performed the cello solo in Strauss' Don Quixote.

While at the Western University Faculty of Music in the 1970s, he founded Quartet Canada together with his Western colleagues violinist Steven Staryk, pianist Ronald Turini and violist Gerald Stanick with whom he recorded and performed many of the standard repertoire compositions for piano quartet.

Tsutsumi gave the world premiere performances and championed several important works by Japanese composers. These include the Akio Yashiro Cello Concerto composed for Tsutsumi and premiered in 1960, which Tsutsumi would later perform with the Chicago Symphony Orchestra conducted by Ozawa, and Toru Takemitsu's "Orion and Pleiades" for cello and orchestra which was commissioned for Tsutsumi by the Suntory Hall. Tsutsumi gave the world premiere of the Takemitsu work in 1984 in Paris with the Japan Philharmonic conducted by Tadaaki Otaka. In October 1990 he performed it with the Boston Symphony Orchestra conducted by Seiji Ozawa in honour of Takemitsu's 60th birthday.

On 25, 26, 28 March 1980, Tsutsumi performed the Memorial to Dr. Martin Luther King Jr. for cello and orchestra by Canadian composer Oskar Morawetz with the Toronto Symphony Orchestra conducted by Victor Feldbrill. On 17 June 1981, Tsutsumi performed the Antonín Dvořák Cello Concerto with the NHK Symphony Orchestra conducted by Heinz Wallberg in a televised broadcast concert.

In 1982, Tsutsumi and Ronald Turini, his colleague at University of Western Ontario, performed in Ottawa, capital city of Canada, at the invitation of the Japanese Ambassador to Canada a recital program which included cello/piano sonatas of Bach, Beethoven, and Rachmaninoff. In 1985, Tsutsumi and Turini performed the world premiere of the Sonata No. 2 for Cello and Piano of Canadian composer André Prévost. In 1985, he toured Japan with Canada's National Arts Centre Orchestra of Ottawa.

In October 1985, Tsutsumi was soloist with the NHK Symphony Orchestra at Avery Fisher Hall at Lincoln Center in New York City performing the Antonín Dvořák Cello Concerto. The New York Times review stated that Tsutsumi played "with energy and care".

Tsutsumi plays a "Montagnana" cello that he has been with since the late 1980s which was manufactured in 1733. Tsutsumi prefers the deep resonant sound of the Montagnana, an instrument also used by the great cellist Emanuel Feuermann, which Tsutsumi claimed produced "a sound I longed for, with a sturdy, strong, and deep quality."

In 1988 Tsutsumi performed the Schubert Arpeggione Sonata for cello and piano with pianist Hiroko Nakamura in Tokyo. In 2001, Tsutsumi performed the Elgar Cello Concerto with Eiji Oue conducting the Yomiuri Nippon Symphony Orchestra.

In July 1991, Tsutsumi and Turini performed a recital at the University of Indiana in Bloomington, Indiana where Tsutsumi had become Professor of Cello. This included the Beethoven Cello and Piano Sonata Op. 69, the Debussy Sonata for Cello and Piano, and the Rachmaninoff Cello and Piano Sonata in g minor, the latter in a highly acclaimed performance. In 2003, Tsutsumi and Turini performed a Canadian Broadcasting Corporation national broadcast recital of cello/piano sonatas of Borodin and Shostakovich. In 2013, Tsutsumi performed the Brahms Cello and Piano Sonata No. 2 with pianist Arthur Rowe in London, Ontario at Wolfe Hall.

Tsutsumi performed at the 2020 Kirishimi International Music Festival in an online concert. Tsutsumi performed the Dvořák Cello Concerto with the NHK Symphony Orchestra in 2013 and later with the Japan Philharmonic Orchestra in 2021. He toured Japan in November 2020 with the Vienna Philharmonic Orchestra performing the Tchaikovsky Variations on a Rococo Theme for cello and orchestra. In 2023, Tsutsumi performed his 80th Anniversary concert tour. On 1, 2 July 2023, Tsutsumi performed the Tchaikovsky Variations on a Rococo Theme with the National Taiwan Symphony Orchestra conducted by Lan Shui. On 1 June 2024 Tsutsumi performed Beethoven cello/piano sonatas at Suntory Hall in Tokyo with pianist Michie Koyama.

== University positions and adjudications ==
Tsutsumi was with University of Western Ontario in London, Ontario, Canada from 1967 to 1984 as Visiting Professor and Resident Artist. His Faculty of Music colleagues at Western included such prominent performing artists as pianist Ronald Turini (with whom he would perform for approximately thirty years), violinist Steven Staryk, violist Gerald Stanik, pianist Dr. Damjana Bratuž (a former fellow graduate student of Tsutsumi and a frequent performance colleague both at Indiana University and at University of Western Ontario), (Note: Tsutsumi said of Dr. Bratuž that "...her great enthusiasm, extensive knowledge and fine artistry have brought out such a high quality of teaching which one can rarely find anywhere in the world.") pianist Arthur Rowe, and pianist Bruce Vogt. Music historian and musicologist Dr. Philip Downs was also a member of the Faculty of Music at University of Western Ontario from 1969 to 2014. Tsutsumi's students at University of Western Ontario included Christine Newland, later principal cello of Orchestra London, and Joel Cohen, later principal cello of the Oakland Symphony, both of whom also had notable solo careers.

Tsutsumi later taught at University of Illinois from 1984 to 1988. From 1988 to 2006 he was Professor of Cello at Indiana University where his colleagues included his former professor János Starker. Tsutsumi is currently President of the Toho Gakuen School of Music, his alma mater, and reportedly the largest music conservatory in the world, from 2004 to the present.

Janos Starker had asked Tsutsumi to assist in the development of South Korean cellists, and Tsutsumi has been Visiting Professor of Cello at Korea National University of Arts since 2017. One of his South Korean students, Hayoung Lee, won 1st place at the 2019 David Popper International Cello Competition. Another South Korean student of Tsutsumi, Sanghyeok Park, won the Grand Prize at the 2021 David Popper International Cello Competition and won second prize at the Penderecki International Cello Competition and third prize at the Tchaikovsky International Competition.

In July 2024, a memorial festival for the 100th birthday of Janos Starker was celebrated in both Tokyo and Seoul organized by Tsutsumi and Professor Sung-Won Yang of South Korea, another prominent former student of Starker. On 17 June 2025 Tsutsumi as the President and Director of Tokyo's Suntory Hall hosted and performed in a joint Korean-Japanese concert to celebrate the 60th Anniversary of diplomatic relations between Japan and South Korea.

Tsutsumi was a jurist at several editions of the Tchaikovsky International Cello Competition in Moscow, including 2019. He was Chairman of the 2022 Emmanuel Feuermann Cello Competition (Grand Prix Emanuel Feuermann).

== Recordings ==
He has recorded the Bach solo cello suites on three different occasions for CBS/Sony Records.

In 1968 Tsutsumi recorded the Kodály Sonata for Unaccompanied Cello for CBS/Sony Records, a work which he presented on several occasions in acclaimed live performances.

In 1976, Tsutsumi and pianist Hiroko Nakamura recorded the Chopin Cello Sonata in G Minor, Op. 65 for cello and piano.

Tsutsumi and Turini recorded the complete Beethoven works for cello and piano, which recordings were distributed world wide by CBS/Sony Records in 1980. The esteemed music critic Tully Potter described the recording of Op. 69 in this set as follows in a 2019 review, "My all-time choice so far is Tsuyoshi Tsutsumi and Ronald Turini in their outstanding Sony set...".

Tsutsumi recorded the Dvořák Cello Concerto in 1982 with Zdeněk Košler conducting the Czech Philharmonic Orchestra for CBS/Sony Records. Prominent reviewer Tully Potter described this recording as "a favourite version, by the great Tsuyoshi Tsutsumi and the Czech Philharmonic under Zdenek Kosler...their rhythms are...precise and their changes of tempo are organic and convincing."

In 1987, Tsutsumi recorded the Haydn Cello Concertos in C and D with the English Chamber Orchestra conducted by José-Luis Garcia for CBS/Sony Records.

Tsutsumi recorded the two Brahms sonatas for cello and piano with Wolfgang Sawallisch for CBS/Sony Records in 1988.

In July 1991, Tsutsumi and Turini performed a recital at the University of Indiana in Bloomington, Indiana where Tsutsumi had become Professor of Cello. This included the Beethoven Cello and Piano Sonata Op. 69, the Debussy Sonata for Cello and Piano, and the Rachmaninoff Cello and Piano Sonata in g minor, the latter in a highly acclaimed performance.

In 1992, he recorded the Bach Viola da Gamba sonatas with pianist Yuji Takahashi in Japan. In 1997, Tsutsumi recorded the solo cello of the Tchaikovsky Swan Lake suite with the Saito Kinen Orchestra conducted by Seiji Ozawa for Philips recordings. In 2012, Tsutsumi recorded the Vocalise No. 2 for solo cello by Canadian composer Murray Adaskin, who had created the work in 1996 at the age of 90 years.

In 2019, Tsutsumi recorded the Rachmaninoff Cello Sonata and the Beethoven Cello and Piano Sonata No. 4 with pianist Mami Hagiwara.

== Awards and distinctions ==
Tsutsumi is President of Suntory Hall, Japan's first dedicated concert hall in Tokyo. He is also President of the Japanese Federation of Musicians. He is known throughout the world of cello students because he is the cellist on most of the famous Suzuki CDs which accompany the Suzuki cello practice books. Tsutsumi's style and intonation in these recordings accompany thousands of students every day when they practice along with his recordings.

Among the many distinctions received, he was awarded the 1970 Suntory Music Award for his contribution to the world of music. In November 2009, Tsutsumi was awarded with a Medal of Honour with purple ribbon by the Government of Japan. In 2024, he received the Order of Culture. Tsutsumi remarked that "I believe that musical art is the common property of mankind and can serve as the foundation for building peace in the world."

== Personal ==
In 1978 he married the Japanese playwright and scholar Harue Tsutsumi after meeting her at University of Toronto. After 1978 they lived consecutively in London, Ontario, Canada (1978-1984), in Illinois (1984-1988), in Indiana (1988-2006), and currently in Tokyo (2006-). She received her doctorate in East Asian languages at Indiana University.

They have two sons.
