= Angela Cheng =

Canadian pianist (born 1959)

- Born: Hong Kong
- Occupations: Musician, educator
- Instrument: Piano

Angela Cheng (Chinese: 鄭美蓮; is a Hong Kong-born Canadian classical pianist. She has performed internationally as a recitalist and as a guest soloist with orchestras. Cheng is a professor of piano at the Oberlin Conservatory of Music.

== Early life and education ==
Cheng was born in Hong Kong and immigrated to Edmonton, Alberta, as a child. She studied piano at Alberta College with Vera Shean and at the University of Alberta with Ernesto Lejano. Anne Burrows, a local patron of the arts, established a foundation to fundraise for Cheng's further training.

With the foundation's support, Cheng studied at the Juilliard School in New York with Sascha Gorodnitzki, earning a bachelor's degree in music. She went on to earn a master's degree in music from Indiana University Bloomington, where she studied with Menahem Pressler.

== Career ==
In 1985, Cheng made her recital debut at Alice Tully Hall in New York City. In 1986, she won third prize at the Arthur Rubinstein International Piano Masters Competition. In 1988, she won first prize at the Montreal International Music Competition (becoming the first Canadian to win the competition). She was awarded a Medal of Excellence at the Mozarteum in Salzburg in 1991.

Cheng went on to have an international performance career. She has performed as a guest soloist with every major orchestra in Canada (including Saskatoon Symphony Orchestra and Vancouver Symphony Orchestra). She has also performed with the Women's Philharmonic (San Francisco), Israel Philharmonic Orchestra, Pan Asia Symphony Orchestra, and Boston Symphony Orchestra.

In 1994, she joined Piano Six (also composed of pianists Janina Fialkowska, Marc-André Hamelin, Angela Hewitt, André Laplante, and Jon Kimura Parker), which aimed to bring classical music to small communities across Canada. In 2012, she made her Carnegie Hall debut, performing with the Edmonton Symphony Orchestra. That year, she also performed with Pinchas Zukerman at the Salzburg Festival.

Cheng first started teaching piano at the University of Colorado. She joined the faculty of the Oberlin Conservatory of Music in 1999. In 2010, she was awarded an honorary doctorate from the University of Alberta, in her hometown of Edmonton.

== Personal life ==
Cheng is married to pianist and fellow Oberlin professor Alvin Chow, with whom she frequently performs. They have two daughters.

== Selected discography ==
- Piano Concertos No. 9 and No. 17. Mozart (1991), with CBC Vancouver Orchestra. CBC Records.
- The Women's Philharmonic. Mendelssohn, Schumann, Tailleferre (1992), with Gillian Benet (harp). Koch International Classics.
- Piano Music of Clara & Robert Schumann (1996), CBC Records.
- Nights in the Gardens of Spain. Albéniz, Turina, de Falla (1999), with Calgary Philharmonic Orchestra. CBC Records.
- The Overcoat: Music of Dmitri Shostakovich (2002), with Jens Lindemann (trumpet). CBC Records.
- Préludes Op 28, Polonaises. Chopin (2006). Universal Music Canada.

== See also ==
- List of classical pianists
