= William Kuinka =

Canadian musician

- Born: January 28, 1916; Prince Rupert, British Columbia, Canada
- Died: April 7, 2008 (aged 92); Sunnybrook Health Sciences Centre, Toronto, Canada
- Education: The Royal Conservatory of Music; Advanced School of Contemporary Music
- Occupations: Mandolinist, bassist, guitarist, educator
- Known for: Member of the Symphony Six

William Kuinka (January 28, 1916 – April 7, 2008) was a Canadian mandolinist, bassist, guitarist, and educator. During his 1951–1952 season with the Toronto Symphony Orchestra, he became known as a member of the Symphony Six, a group of six musicians under contract to the orchestra who were denied entry to the United States for a concert tour under suspicion of leftist activities.

== Early life and career ==
William Kuinka was born in Prince Rupert, British Columbia. He served in World War II and was part of an army show unit. After the war, he studied at The Royal Conservatory of Music in Toronto with Charles Rose, John Weinzweig, John Moskalyk, and others; at the Advanced School of Contemporary Music in Toronto, and in New York City. Kuinka played double bass with the CBC Symphony Orchestra, the Toronto Symphony Orchestra, the Pro Arte Orchestra, and the Hamilton Philharmonic Orchestra. Self-taught in mandolin and guitar, he played mandolin with the Ivan Romanoff orchestra.

== Symphony Six ==
Kuinka played only one season (1951–1952) with the Toronto Symphony Orchestra. In November 1951 the Toronto Symphony Orchestra was invited to participate in the "Major Symphony Series" in Detroit, its first appearance in the United States, alongside major US orchestras from Boston, Chicago, Cleveland, and Philadelphia. In keeping with US immigration laws, the orchestra submitted its list of members for clearance. Seven musicians were not given clearance; this was later pared down to six: Kuinka, Dirk Keetbaas, Abe Mannheim, John Moskalyk, Ruth Budd, and Steven Staryk (later known as the Symphony Six), who were denied access to the United States under suspicion of leftist activities. The performers had associated openly with communist or communist front organizations in the vein of artistic collaboration, but denied the charges of political involvement. At the end of the season the orchestra did not renew its contracts with these musicians. This created a controversy in Canada.

== Later career ==
Kuinka performed with the Toronto Renaissance Quintet from 1963 to 1965. In 1964 he founded the Toronto Mandolin Chamber Ensemble, which existed until 1969. He also performed with the orchestra of the National Ballet of Canada.

Kuinka taught classical guitar at the Brodie School of Music in Toronto from 1965 to 1979 and mandolin at Wilfrid Laurier University from 1980 to 1981. He taught stringed instruments for the Etobicoke Board of Education from 1969 to 1989. He performed with Nexus and with Oscar Peterson.

== Personal ==
He married Rose Kramaruk around 1942.

His daughter Valerie has performed with the orchestras of the National Ballet of Canada and the Canadian Opera Company. She married the tenor Richard Margison.

Kuinka died at Sunnybrook Health Sciences Centre in Toronto at the age of 92.
