= Dirk Keetbaas =

Dutch-born Canadian musician (1921–1995)

Dirk Keetbaas Jr.
- Born: June 20, 1921; Scheveningen, Netherlands
- Died: July 27, 1995 (aged 74); Calgary, Alberta, Canada
- Occupations: flautist, composer, and record producer
- Known for: Member of the Symphony Six
- Spouse: Mary Persoage

Dirk Keetbaas Jr. (June 20, 1921 – July 27, 1995) was a Dutch-born flautist, composer, and record producer in Canada. He became known as a member of the Symphony Six, a group of six musicians under contract to the Toronto Symphony Orchestra who were denied entry to the United States for a concert tour under suspicion of leftist activities.

== Early life ==
Dirk Keetbaas Jr. was born in Scheveningen, the Netherlands, to Dirk Keetbaas Sr. (1895-1988), who later became a violist and conductor in Ottawa, Ontario, Canada.

== Career ==
From 1940 to 1945 Keetbaas played with the Central Band of the Royal Canadian Air Force in Ottawa. From 1946 to 1953, he performed in various chamber groups in Toronto, as well as played with the Toronto Symphony Orchestra and the CBC Symphony Orchestra.

In November 1951 the Toronto Symphony Orchestra was invited to participate in the "Major Symphony Series" in Detroit, its first appearance in the United States, alongside major US orchestras from Boston, Chicago, Cleveland, and Philadelphia. In keeping with US immigration laws, the orchestra submitted its list of members for clearance. Seven musicians were not given clearance; this was later pared down to six: Keetbaas, William Kuinka, Abe Mannheim, John Moskalyk, Ruth Budd, and Steven Staryk (later known as the Symphony Six), who were denied access to the United States under suspicion of leftist activities. The performers had associated openly with communist or communist front organizations in the vein of artistic collaboration, but denied the charges of political involvement. At the end of the season the orchestra did not renew its contracts with these musicians. This created a controversy in Canada.

Keetbaas went on to become the principal flautist for the Winnipeg Symphony Orchestra and the CBC Winnipeg Orchestra from 1953 to 1968. From 1956 to 1966 he directed and performed with the Dirk Keetbaas Players, a wind quintet featuring flute, oboe, clarinet, bassoon, and French horn.

Keetbaas composed a Quintet for Winds in 1961 and the orchestral overture Woodhaven in 1965. Keetbaas was the flautist in Five Improvisations and composer-flautist in Three Miniatures for Solo Flute, Music and Musicians of Canada III and E.gré plays E.gré.

In 1968, Keetbaas began producing records for the new CBC Records label and also taught music. He moved to Calgary, Alberta in 1985 and continued teaching composition to private students.

== Personal ==
Around 1935, he married Mary Persoage (1919–2011) in Toronto. They had one son.

He died in Calgary on July 27, 1995, at age of 74. He had donated his music collection to the University of Manitoba.

== Bibliography ==
- Keetbaas, Dirk (1991). The Woodwind Quintet: An historical survey. Winnipeg.
- Keetbaas, Dirk (1991). Catalog of Collection.
- Three Miniatures for Solo Flute. Jaymar Music. 1971.
