= Ernest MacMillan Family Home =

Coordinates: 43.675377°N 79.382246°W

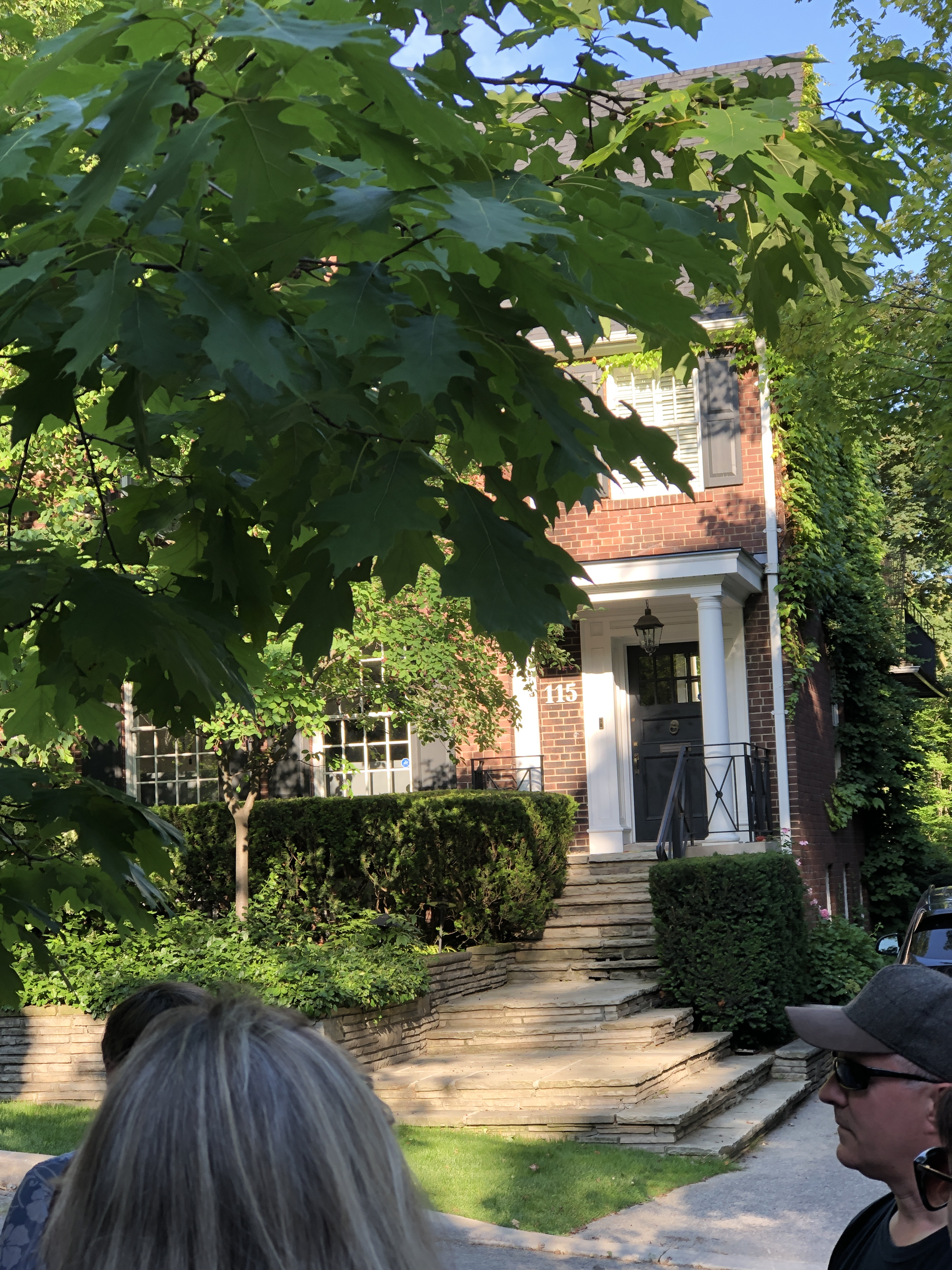
115 Park Road in 2019

The Ernest MacMillan Family Home is a heritage property located at 115 Park Road in the Rosedale neighbourhood of Toronto, Ontario, Canada. It was constructed during 1931 and 1932 as the residence of Sir Ernest MacMillan and his wife, Lady MacMillan (née Elsie Keith).

== History ==
In 1931, MacMillan and his wife commissioned Page and Steele architects of Toronto for the construction of a new house at 115 Park Road. The building was completed in 1932.

The family home was later designated a Heritage Property, as adopted by Toronto City Council, on January 22, 1979. The house is also included in the South Rosedale Heritage Conservation District. South Rosedale was designated as a Heritage Conservation District under Part V of the Ontario Heritage Act, and also enacted by Toronto City Council, on February 7, 2003.
