= Orchestra London Canada =

Canadian professional symphony orchestra based

Orchestra London (Canada) was a professional symphony orchestra based in London, Ontario in Canada.

== History ==
There was a group under the name London Symphony Orchestra performing in London, Ontario in the 1890s. In the 1890s, a group of about 41 players performed in London, Ontario, Canada, as the London Symphony Orchestra. This group pre-dated the famous orchestra in London, England with the same name, which was founded in 1904.

The current orchestra was founded by conductor and violinist Bruce Sharpe in 1937 with the name the London Civic Symphony Orchestra.

With increased funding, the orchestra engaged Martin Boundy as music director in 1950, and he would remain in this position until 1969. In 1957, with increased numbers of professional players, the orchestra changed its name to the London Symphony Orchestra.

In 1964, the orchestra collaborated with the Robert Shaw Chorale and the London Conservatory Choir in a performance of William Walton's Belshazzar's Feast conducted by Robert Shaw in Thames Hall at the University of Western Ontario. The London Conservatory Choir was founded and directed by Earle Terry between 1953 and 1968, and collaborated with both the London Symphony Orchestra and the Cleveland Symphony Orchestra in its many visits to the city.

The orchestra obtained a home concert hall with the opening of Centennial Hall in London in 1967. The inaugural event of Centennial Hall was a performance on 25 September 1967 by the New York Philharmonic Orchestra conducted by Leonard Bernstein of the Mahler Symphony No. 4 and the Ives Symphony No. 2.

A 1975 grant of $100,000 from the Richard and Jean Ivey Fund enabled the orchestra to hire 30 full-time musicians. These hirings made the orchestra eligible for Canada Council funding for the first time. Toronto Star music critic, William Littler described the London Symphony Orchestra as "...an orchestra capable of serving an entire region of the province."

As the orchestra achieved fully recognized professional status in the mid-1970s during the tenure of music director Clifford Evens, it adopted the name Orchestra London in 1981 to avoid confusion with the famous London Symphony Orchestra in London, England.

The orchestra continued with regular seasons of standard repertoire under well-established music directors Clifford Evens (1969–1979), Victor Feldbrill (1979–1981), Alexis Hauser (1981–1988), Uri Mayer (1988–1994), Mark Laycock (1995–1998), Simon Streatfeild (1999–2000), Timothy Vernon (2000–2010), and Alain Trudel (2010–2014).

Guest soloists included tenor Jon Vickers, pianists Glenn Gould and Ronald Turini, contraltos Jessye Norman and Maureen Forrester, baritone Robert Goulet, pianist Anton Kuerti, soprano Shirley Jones, jazz performer Moe Koffman, pianist Louis Lortie, violinists James Ehnes and Scott St. John, and conductors Sir Ernest MacMillan and Mario Bernardi.

== Bankruptcy and termination ==
After weeks of speculation, the orchestra ceased operations on December 11, 2014, due to massive budget shortfalls. The musicians of the now bankrupt organization formally filed for bankruptcy on behalf of the orchestra on May 22, 2015.

== Transition to London Symphonia ==
Despite this, the contracted musicians of the ensemble have continued to put on self-produced concerts within the London community.

Initially, former musicians of the ensemble played under the identity, "#WePlayOn". On January 20, 2017, however, the musicians launched their new identity, London Symphonia at a concert at Metropolitan United Church in London, Ontario. The new identity includes a logo change and the launch of a new website. The group has 28 musicians and a concertmaster. The London Symphonia performs with renowned soloists such as violinist James Ehnes and pianist Janina Fialkowska.
