= Daniel Vnukowski =

Polish Canadian pianist (born 1981)

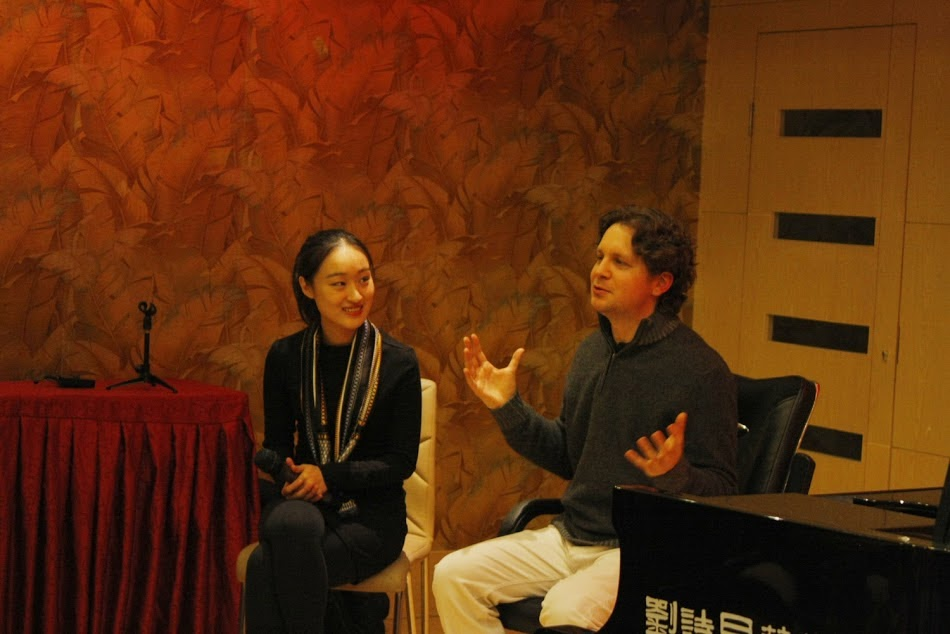
- Vnukowski giving a lecture recital in China

Background information
- Born: July 15, 1981 (age 45); Windsor, Ontario, Canada
- Occupation: Pianist
- Instrument: Piano
- Years active: 1995-2012, 2016-present
- Website: www.danperforms.com

Daniel Vnukowski (born July 15, 1981, also Wnukowski) is a Polish Canadian pianist and classical music broadcaster.

== Early years and training ==
Vnukowski was born in Windsor, Ontario. One of his grandfathers was a Holocaust survivor. At age 3 and a half he showed strong fascination for a grand piano made completely out of glass in a music store and begged his parents to begin taking piano lessons. At the age of 12, he performed his composition "Like A Dove" together with the Windsor Symphony Orchestra. In 1997, at the age of 15, he moved to Warsaw, Poland for further studies and in 2000 became a laureate of the National Chopin Piano Competition resulting in many concerts all throughout Europe.

He studied piano at the Fryderyk Chopin Academy of Music in Warsaw, Poland, with Piotr Paleczny, at the Peabody Conservatory in Baltimore, Maryland, with Leon Fleisher and at the Guildhall School of Music and Drama with Ronan O'Hora and Graham Johnson. In 2006, he was awarded a scholarship to study at the International Piano Academy Lake Como.

== Career and musical style ==
His winning numerous performance awards and prizes has enabled him to perform all over Europe, Asia, North America and South America in important concert halls including the National Philharmonic in Warsaw, Poland, the Concertgebouw Music Hall in Amsterdam, the Netherlands, the Salle Pleyel in Paris, France, and the Stadt Casino in Basel, Switzerland, the Tokyo University of the Arts in Tokyo, Japan, and the Accademia di Santa Cecilia in Rome, Italy.

He has performed with the Polish Radio Orchestra, Sinfonia Varsovia, Windsor Symphony, Orchestra Filarmonica Marchigiana, Southfield Symphony, Poznan Philharmonic, Sinfonia Iuventus, Tifereth Israel Orchestra, with conductors such as Jerzy Maksymiuk, Alain Trudel, David Amos, Tomasz Bugaj, Romolo Gessi and John Morris Russell. He is also active as a chamber musician and vocal accompanist. His festival engagements include performances at the Festival Dei Due Mondi in Spoleto, Italy; the Pre-LSO Concert Series in London, UK; the Coppet Festival in Geneva, Switzerland; and the Euromusica Masterconcert Series and Uto Ughi Festival in Rome, Italy.

Vnukowski has an interest in the music of Frédéric Chopin and other notable Polish composers such as Karol Szymanowski, Marek Stachowski, and Pawel Szymański. He has performed at numerous Frédéric Chopin societies around the world in cities such as Rome, Paris, Vienna, Toronto, Basel, Tokyo, Detroit, Warsaw, Singapore, Buenos Aires and Duszniki Zdrój. In 2010, Vnukowski performed Chopin's works worldwide in honor of the composer's 200th birth anniversary, including a recital together with soprano Aleksandra Kurzak in Poznań, Poland.

Daniel Vnukowski has also performed in numerous piano festivals such as the Chopin and His Europe festival in Warsaw, Poland, the Spoleto Festival Dei Due Mondi in Spoleto, Italy, the Duszniki Zdrój Chopin Festival in Duszniki Zdrój, Poland, the Euromusica Masterconcert Series and the Uto Ughi Festival in Rome, Italy, International Piano Festival Chopiniana in Buenos Aires, Argentina, the Coppet Festival in Geneva, Switzerland, as well as those organized by the Chopin Society in Basel, Switzerland, the Chopin Society in Vienna, Austria and the Chopin Society in Rome, Italy.

Career highlights:

- On November 16, 2019, he led the first-ever fundraiser for the Africville Museum in Halifax, NS, Canada.
- On June 18, 2019, he inaugurated the Collingwood Summer Music Festival with a performance of Beethoven's Choral Fantasy, op. 80.
- On May 17, 2019, he performed the Polish premiere of the Concerto for Piano and Orchestra, op. 45 by Karol Rathaus with the Poznan Philharmonic under the direction of Ariel Zuckermann, which was recorded live and broadcast on Deutschlandfunk Kultur Radio
- On May 3, 2019, he presented a rarely performed sonata by Karol Rathaus at his Carnegie Hall Debut and was called a "pianist to watch" by New York Classical Review.
- On November 30, 2018, he presented a selection of Mazurkas by Chopin in a recital entitled "Conversations with Chopin" for live radio at the New Classical FM in Toronto, Ontario, Canada.
- On November 20, 2017, he performed a lecture recital for music students at University of California, San Diego on the topic of exiled Jewish composers.
- On January 1, 2017, he inaugurated the 2017 year at National Philharmonic in Warsaw, performing Gershwin's Rhapsody in Blue under the direction of Jerzy Maksymiuk.
- On May 7, 2016, he performed a recently published piano concerto by Józef Koffler together with Sinfonia Iuventus under the direction of Krzysztof Slowinski at the Festival of Music Encounters in Warsaw, Poland.
- On March 27, 2011, he performed a recital at the Stelio Molo Auditorium, in Lugano, Switzerland to celebrate the 200th Anniversary of Liszt's Birth, which was broadcast on RSI Swiss radio.
- On December 10, 2010, he performed as a collaborative pianist and Samling Scholar at the Wigmore Hall in London, UK.
- In May 2010, Vnukowski performed a special recital in Tokyo to commemorate the unveiling of a new Chopin monument in that city. This also led to a debut in Singapore, where he accompanied an Erhu, in the hall of the Singapore Chinese Orchestra. He also performed an outdoor concert for a large crowd at the Singapore Botanic Gardens in a concert program titled "Chopin by the Lake."
- In 2007, he performed Brahms Piano Concerto No. 2 and Mozart's Piano Concert No. 27 with the Polish Radio Orchestra under the direction of Tomasz Bugaj which was broadcast on Polish Radio stations.
- At age 14, he performed at the Polish Embassy for government diplomats and officials in Ottawa, Ontario, becoming the youngest pianist to ever perform at the Embassy.
- In 1997, in remembrance of the outbreak of World War II, he performed a recital at the National Theatre in Warsaw, Poland in front of an audience of over 2,000 people, which was broadcast all over European television.

His performances have been broadcast on international radio and television stations, including CBC Radio, Polish Radio 2, Dublin City FM, Tuttoggi TV, Rai Uno, Radiotelevisione svizzera di lingua italiana and Last FM.

The San Diego Art's music critic wrote that "his dynamic range is phenomenal" and that he has an "ability to play things at supernatural velocity without making a single mistake."

== Music of exiled composers ==
The music of interwar Jewish composers is a particular focus of Vnukowski's repertoire, especially those composers who were affected by the Holocaust. Vnukowski is the recipient of grants from the Canada Council for the Arts and other foundations for promoting the works of exiled composers such as Szymon Laks, Władysław Szpilman, Viktor Ullmann, and Józef Koffler. Vnukowski recorded the recently published piano concerto of Józef Koffler together with Sinfonia Iuventus Orchestra conducted by Christoph Slowinski, which was released on the EDA label in 2017. In January 2019, he released an album featuring the solo piano works of Karol Rathaus on the Toccata Classics Label, which was called a "crucial addition to the library of anyone interested in interwar German music" by Fanfare Magazine.

Vnukowski's recordings in this field have also included the exiled composer Walter Arlen's complete piano works, which Vnukowski edited for the Vienna-based publisher Doblinger. Additionally, his performance of Walter Arlen's piano works at the Austrian Parliament on May 5, 2017, during the International Day of Commemoration in memory of the victims of the Holocaust (Gedenktag gegen Gewalt und Rassismus im Gedenken an die Opfer des Nationalsozialismus) was broadcast live on Austrian television for ORF-2. His recordings of Walter Arlen's piano music were used as a soundtrack in a documentary about the composer's life titled "Walter Arlen's First Century" (Das erste Jahrhundert des Walter Arlen), which premiered at the Vienna International Film Festival on October 30, 2018.

He has received accolades from music critics for his performances and recordings of music by exiled composers. The Sunday Times called him "a dashing pianist",; the 2018 Autumn issue of Fanfare Magazine noted "a fierce inner conviction and sense of discovery."; the 2019 July/August issue of the American Record Guide remarked that his performances of Karol Rathaus's compositions were "played to the hilt".

== Classical Music Outreach ==
Vnukowski is currently active in promoting various charitable organizations. In 2018, he founded the Piano Six "New Generation" collective that involves five other pianists performing in remote, rural regions throughout Canada. Vnukowski also joined as a member of the Vienna-based Varietas Ensemble, which performs recitals for handicapped children.

== Discography ==
=== Orchestral / Concertos ===
- George Gershwin: Rhapsody in Blue. With The Warmińsko-Mazurska Philharmonic, celebrating the XII New Year's Concert at the National Philharmonic in Warsaw. MTeatr. (2017)
- Józef Koffler: en hommage: Koffler. Piano Concerto with Sinfonia Iuventus. EDA Records, EDA 42. (2016)

=== Solo albums ===
- Walter Arlen: Die Letzte Blaue. With violinist Daniel Hope, soprano Rebecca Nelsen, and baritone Christian Immler Gramola: 98996.
- Walter Arlen: Wien, du allein. With soprano Rebecca Nelsen. Gramola: 99078.
- Frédéric Chopin: A Chopin Recital. Recorded at the Glenn Gould Studio in Toronto, Ontario, in 2001.
