= Alexis Hauser =

Austrian conductor (born 1947)

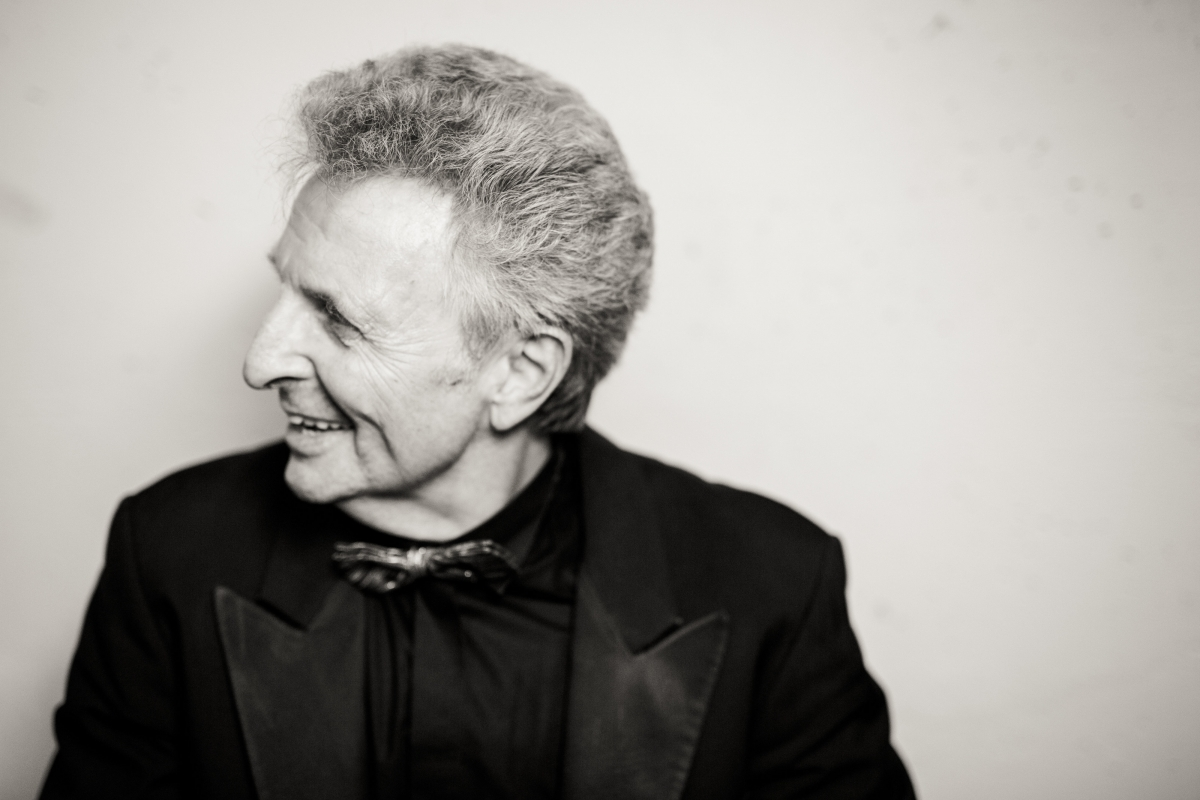
Montreal, 2015

Alexis Hauser (born May 25, 1947) is an Austrian conductor and professor at the Schulich School of Music of McGill University in Montreal, Quebec, Canada. Winner of the Koussevitzky Conducting Prize of the Boston Symphony Orchestra at the Tanglewood Music Festival in 1974, Alexis Hauser has established an international conducting career with numerous appearances in Europe, North and South America, and the Far East.

Hauser was born in Vienna and graduated from the Vienna Academy of Music. In the early 1980s, he served as music director of the Orchestra London Canada.

== Honours ==
- Winner of the Koussevitzky Conducting Prize of the Boston Symphony Orchestra and recipient of the Leonard Bernstein Scholarship for Tanglewood 1974
- First Prize at the first International Hans Swarowsky Conducting Competition in 1977 in Vienna
- Award of Merit of the Canadian Performing Arts Organization, "for innovative programming of contemporary music"
