= Harue Tsutsumi =

Japanese playwright (born 1950)

- Born: 1950 (age 75–76); Osaka, Kansai region
- Occupation: Playwright

Harue Tsutsumi (堤春恵, Tsutsumi Harue; born 1950) is a Japanese playwright. She specializes in kabuki, specifically kabuki in the Meiji Era.

== Biography ==
Tsutsumi was born in 1950 in Osaka, Japan. Tsutsumi earned her master’s in theatre history at Osaka University. While she attended Osaka University, she studied under the playwright and scholar Masakazu Yamazaki. She was influenced by Yamazaki and read his plays such as Zeami and Ambition and Summer Grass.

In 1978 she married the Japanese cellist Tsuyoshi Tsutsumi after meeting him at University of Toronto. After 1978 they lived variously in London, Ontario, Canada, in Illinois, in Indiana, and currently in Tokyo. She received her doctorate in East Asian languages at Indiana University Bloomington.

== Works ==
In 1988, Tsutsumi wrote her first play The Strange Tales of the Rokumeikan (Rokumeikan Ibun).

=== Kanadehon Hamlet ===
In 1992 she wrote Kanadehon Hamlet (Kanadehon Hamuretto) and won the Yomiuri Prize in the drama category. Kanadehon Hamlet takes place in the nineteenth century and is about a troupe of kabuki actors who are having difficulties trying to perform Hamlet, written by William Shakespeare, on stage since all they know how to perform is kabuki. Kanadehon Hamlet takes Hamlet, a tragedy, and Kanadehon Chūshingura, a melodrama, and brings them together in a world where the two plays could be performed together by the same set of actors. Even though the two plays are in their own distinct genres, Tsutsumi was able to draw similarities and differences between the two plays. Both of their plots and characters are very similar. Both of the protagonists Hamlet from Hamlet and Yuranosuke from Kanadehon Chūshingura seek revenge against the main villain of their respective plays. The villains are even attracted to their victim's wife and was a motive for the murder of the victim. One of the actors even jokes about the possibility that Shakespeare read Kanadehon Chūshingura first and wrote Hamlet after reading it. While most of the characters and the setting is fictional, some of the characters are based on real figures such as Japanese producer Morita Kan'ya XII, the producer and victim in the play. Kanadehon Hamlet was first performed in Japan in 1992, 1994, and 1997. In 1997, the play was also produced in New York City. All of the productions were performed by the Kiyama Theatre Productions and were directed by Sueki Toshifumi.

=== Destination Japan ===
The play Destination Japan is about a Zainichi pianist named Ha Song'ae. Ha Song'ae has to fight for her right to stay in Japan and keep her name. At the end of the play she regains her status as a permanent resident. Unlike past plays, Destination Japan takes place in a contemporary setting rather than being in the past such as the Meiji era. Tsutsumi was inspired to write the play after reading Choi Soon'ae's book, To Continue Questioning "My Country": The Repercussions of a Refusal to Being Fingerprinted. The play's plot follows Soon-ae's life and the legal actions she took to secure her status as a permanent resident of Japan as a second-generation resident Korean. Ha Song'ae is based on Choi Soon'ae and other characters in Destination Japan are based on people Soon'ae encountered while trying to abolish the use of fingerprinting policies.
