= Walter Arlen =

American composer (1920–2023)

- Arlen in 2020, aged 100
- Born: Walter Aptowitzer; July 31, 1920; Vienna, Austria
- Died: September 2, 2023 (aged 103); Santa Monica, California, US
- Citizenship: Austria; United States
- Occupations: Composer; music critic; academic teacher
- Organizations: Los Angeles Times; Loyola Marymount University
- Spouse: Howard Myers (m. 2013)
- Awards: Decoration of Honour for Services to the Republic of Austria

Walter Arlen (né Aptowitzer; July 31, 1920 – September 2, 2023) was an Austrian and American composer, focused on songs for voice and piano. Just after completing school, he fled the Nazi regime in Vienna for the United States, where he worked as a music critic for the Los Angeles Times, and a professor of music at the Loyola Marymount University. He was recognised as a composer late in life.

== Life and career ==
Walter Aptowitzer was born in Vienna on July 31, 1920, to a middle-class Jewish family. His parents ran Warenhaus Dichter, a department store founded by his grandfather in 1890. At age five, his grandfather took him to musicologist Otto Erich Deutsch, who discovered that he had perfect pitch, and recommended that he take piano lessons. He had a piano in his room, and felt an urge to compose at age ten.

His parents' department store was expropriated by the Nazis after the Night of Broken Glass in 1938. His father was sent to Buchenwald concentration camp and his mother suffered a nervous breakdown.

He left Austria right after completing school, in 1939, and immigrated to the United States, changing his name to Arlen. He first settled in Chicago, while other family members escaped to London, a fact he did not know. He made money by working as a salesman. Suffering from depression, he saw a therapist who recommended to pick up composing as a means of therapy. He trained at the Chicago Conservatory, with Leo Sowerby and Roy Harris, whose assistant he became. He won a composition prize of the Conservatory. He studied composition further at Vanderbilt University in Nashville, Tennessee, and the University of California in Los Angeles, where he graduated with a master's degree in 1955.

Arlen worked as a journalist and music critic for the Los Angeles Times, first as an assistant to Albert Goldberg who was music critic from 1952 to 1980. It gave him first-hand experience of the musical life of the city. He founded the music department at Loyola University Chicago in 1969, and was emerited in 1990. Arlen established friendships with numerous other German and Austrian émigrées, including Stravinsky, Milhaud, Villa-Lobos, and Carlos Chávez. He was instrumental in tracking down other artists from the Nazi era whose works were lost or forgotten due to the systematic destruction of art that was deemed degenerate by the regime. Arlen returned to composition only after retiring from the journalist post in the 1980s.

On July 2, 2013, he married his partner Howard Myers in West Hollywood, California. In 2020 he received honorary citizenship from the town of Bad Sauerbrunn on his 100th birthday.

Arlen was interviewed at length for the 2023 Netflix documentary Eldorado: Everything the Nazis Hate; he talked about his first love as a teenager, Fülöp "Lumpi" Loránt, a Hungarian Jew and family friend, who was murdered by the Nazis in the Holocaust.

Arlen lived in Santa Monica, California, and died at a hospital in the city on September 2, 2023, at age 103.

== Works ==
Arlen composed 65 works, mostly for voice and piano. In the 1980s, he set poetry by Saint John of the Cross which his partner Howard Myers had given to him. He stopped composing in 2000, when he became blind due to macular degeneration. His works were published by Doblinger.

His works for voice and piano include:

- Excerpt from The Song of Songs, setting excerpts from Song of Songs
- Four Robert Frost Songs, setting poetry by Robert Frost
- Five Songs of Love and Yearning, setting texts by John of the Cross
- Sonnets to Orpheus, setting Rilke's poetry
- "Es geht wohl anders", setting a poem by Eichendorff
- Sonnets of Shakespeare, setting some sonnets by Shakespeare
- "Le Tombeau de Gabriel Fauré", setting a poem by Rilke
- The poet in Exile, setting poems by Czesław Miłosz
- Endymion, setting poems by Constantine P. Cavafy
- "Wiegenlied", setting a poem by Paul Heyse

=== Recordings ===
Arlen's works were recorded by Gramola, after they were discovered late in his life by Michael Haas who led the degenerate music program at Decca Records. The first CD of Arlen's music was released when he was 92 years old. The pianist was often Daniel Vnukowski who focused on music by composers in exile due to the Nazis. He edited Arlen's piano works for the publisher Doblinger. His recordings of Arlen's piano music were used as a soundtrack in a documentary about the composer's life, entitled Walter Arlen's First Century (Das erste Jahrhundert des Walter Arlen), premiered at the Vienna International Film Festival on October 30, 2018. Vnukowski also produced a video on the occasion of Arlen's centenary.

- 2012: Es geht wohl anders (Things turn out differently), Rebecca Nelsen (soprano), Christian Immler (baritone), Danny Driver (piano), 2 CDs, Gramola
- 2014: Die letzte Blaue, Rebecca Nelsen, Christian Immler, Daniel Vnukowski, Daniel Hope, 2 CDs, Gramola
- 2015: "Wien, du allein": Memories of an Exiled Wandering Viennese Jew Rebecca Nelsen, Daniel Vnukowski, 2 CDs, Gramola

== Awards ==
- 2008: Decoration of Honour for Services to the Republic of Austria
- 2011: Decoration of Honour for Services to the State of Vienna
- 2015: Goldener Rathausmann of the city of Vienna
- 2020: Honorary citizen of Bad Sauerbrunn
