= Symphony Six =

Group of Canadian musicians denied entry to the US

The Symphony Six were a group of Canadian musicians under contract to the Toronto Symphony Orchestra (TSO) who were denied entry to the United States for a concert tour in November 1951. Coming at the height of the McCarthy era in the US, the six musicians – Ruth Budd, Dirk Keetbaas, William Kuinka, Abe Mannheim, John Moskalyk, and Steven Staryk – were denied visas on the suspicion of being involved in communist activities. The TSO sent other musicians in their place and completed its tour. The six musicians resumed playing with the orchestra upon its return to Canada.

At the end of the 1951-1952 season, the TSO refused to renew the contracts of these musicians, stating that they had not fulfilled their contractual agreements. The six musicians appealed this decision to its union, the Toronto Musicians' Association; the Mayor of Toronto; the Canadian Civil Liberties Association; and many other bodies, without success. They received support from the Federation of Canadian Artists and the Canada Council for the Arts, but not from the Canadian Congress of Labour. The incident garnered extensive media coverage in both Canada and the United States, and sparked a protest against the TSO's decision. The orchestra's director, Ernest MacMillan, did not speak about the matter in public, which also prompted criticism, and two members of the TSO board resigned. The six musicians were viewed with suspicion by their colleagues and people avoided them to protect themselves from guilt by association. Budd and Staryk later returned to the TSO, while the four other musicians continued their careers elsewhere.

== Background ==
The Toronto Symphony Orchestra was founded by Luigi von Kunits in 1922. From 1931 to 1956 it was conducted by Sir Ernest MacMillan, who achieved renown as "the leading figure in Canadian music". By the 1940s the orchestra's popularity had increased, but its financial condition did not allow it to tour or invite many guest conductors and soloists. In 1951-52 it received CA$56,000 in donations and grants, CA$10,000 less than the amount raised by the smaller Vancouver Symphony Orchestra. Some TSO musicians freelanced for the CBC Symphony Orchestra and a few left the TSO to work for the CBC. MacMillan hoped that the TSO could boost its reputation through international engagements.

== Event ==
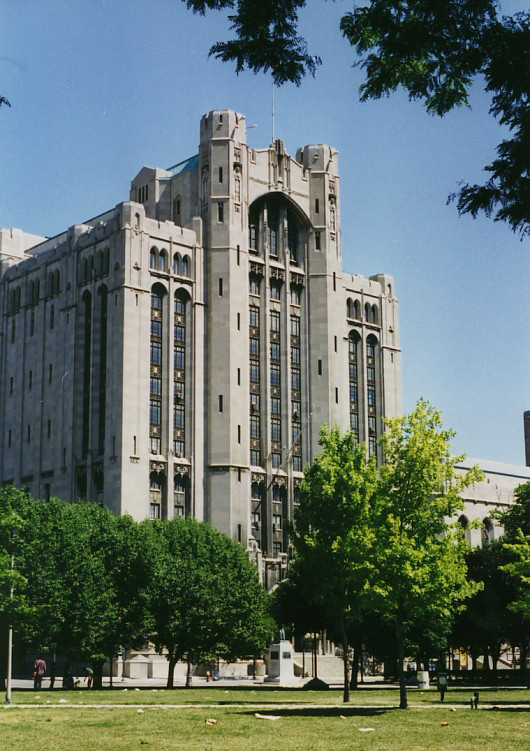
Detroit Masonic Temple, venue for the 1951 Major Symphony Series

The Toronto Symphony Orchestra was invited to perform at the Detroit Masonic Temple auditorium on November 27, 1951 as part of the Major Symphony Series, which also featured the Boston Symphony Orchestra, the Chicago Symphony Orchestra, the Cleveland Orchestra, and the Philadelphia Orchestra. TSO director MacMillan viewed this first-ever US invitation as a golden opportunity to garner more international invitations for the orchestra. He added vocal soloist Lois Marshall to the orchestra, as well as a piece by an American composer, Herbert Elwell's work Pastorale, and Edward Elgar's Enigma Variations, to the repertoire.

At this time in the United States, McCarthyism was at its height, generating fear and suspicion of entertainment industry figures, academics, military figures, and government officials by accusing them of real or suggested links to communist activities. The TSO was required to submit to United States immigration authorities all the names of its musicians and other staff who would be accompanying the tour. The immigration department approved visas for all but seven musicians, suspecting them of communist activities. One of the musicians was later cleared, leaving six musicians who were denied entry.

These six musicians, who became known as the Symphony Six, were:

- Ruth Budd, double bassist. Born in Winnipeg, she joined the TSO in 1947, becoming Canada's first professional female bassist.
- Dirk Keetbaas, Jr., principal flautist. Born in the Netherlands, Keetbaas was a naturalized Canadian citizen. He also performed in the CBC Symphony Orchestra and in chamber music groups. He joined the TSO in 1949.
- William Kuinka, double bassist. Born in British Columbia, he had served in the Second World War. He was self-taught in mandolin and guitar as well. The 1951-1952 season was his first and last year in the TSO.
- Abe Mannheim, bassist. This was his fourth season with the orchestra. Immigration officials had questioned him for 4 hours.
- John Moskalyk, violinist. He joined the TSO in 1945.
- Steven Staryk, violinist. Born in Toronto, he studied violin as a child with, among others, John Mosklyk, and performed in his first recital on CBC Radio at the age of 14. He joined the TSO in 1950 when he was still in his teens.

The McCarthy era was a terrible time, when nobody had to prove anything. You had only to be suspected of left leaning and that was enough. As I was walking past the women's dressing room, I heard one of my colleagues say, 'Well, she reads a lot so she must be a communist'.

— Ruth Budd

Several of the six musicians had been involved with Canadian-Russian friendship organizations formed in the 1940s for the purposes of artistic collaboration; however, they denied charges of political involvement. Staryk related that he had played at Ukrainian and other ethnic events, and Budd admitted to being a member of a left-wing youth group. John Moskalyk's surname was listed in the TSO's programs as "Moscow"; he had conducted the Budapest orchestra for two concert performances in August 1949. Keetbaas could not recall any association with left-wing groups. Harry Freedman, who was on the board of the Toronto Musicians' Association at the time and whose vote thwarted unanimous decisions against the Symphony Six, stated that he was not aware of any of the six musicians promoting communism. Later, he felt that he should have taken "more direct action".

MacMillan himself had been involved in the National Council for Canadian-Soviet Friendship in the 1940s, though he had since quit that organization. In 1950, with an eye to taking the orchestra on international tours, he had written a letter to the American consul in Toronto admitting his former affiliation. He received his visa in November 1951 without any difficulties. After the six musicians were denied entry and before the orchestra had left for the United States, MacMillan solicited help for them from the Canadian ambassador in Washington, but his plea was unsuccessful. In January 1952 he wrote to US immigration officials trying to clear Staryk's name, lauding him as "an exceptionally talented violinist and valuable member of the orchestra. I have no reason to doubt that he has no Communist affiliations other than that he played from ages twelve to fourteen with a Ukrainian orchestra that is under some suspicion". His entreaties on behalf of Staryk did not help to exonerate the musician.

The TSO board sent other musicians in place of the six who had been denied visas, and the concert went on as planned. The orchestra's performance was a success and received positive reviews from both the American and Canadian press. After the TSO returned to Canada, the six musicians resumed their positions.

== Refusal to renew contracts ==
At the end of the 1951-1952 season, with more American concerts planned for the orchestra in Boston, New York City, and Philadelphia in the coming season, the TSO did not renew its contracts with all six musicians. Jack Elton, manager of the orchestra, discussed the problem of these six players with the TSO board in a meeting held on April 21, 1952. At the meeting, Elton said that "for artistic reasons there could be no substitutes for such an important concert". The board agreed with Elton's arguments and contended that the six musicians had not fulfilled their contractual agreement to join the orchestra on international tours, and that being barred from entering the United States would prevent them from joining the orchestra in future US appearances. Ernest MacMillan was not present at the meeting.

The incident and the board's decision not to renew the musicians' contracts created controversy when it became public, garnering media attention both nationally and internationally. Members of the press castigated the TSO for not cancelling the US tour in protest over the immigration department’s decision, citing a similar case in which the Royal Concertgebouw Orchestra of Amsterdam had cancelled its US tour when several of its musicians were denied entry. One reporter, Langford Dixon of The Globe and Mail, "defended the six so vehemently that it led to his dismissal from the paper". Many people wrote letters to the TSO and some even cancelled their subscriptions. For its part, the TSO board blamed the newly established Canadian television for the unprecedented decline in subscriptions. A letter to the editor of Toronto Daily Star called the firing "an offence against Canadian independence."

The TSO board gave orchestra manager Jack Elton the authority to decide what steps should be taken. Elton asked the Toronto Musicians' Association to intervene. The union upheld the board's decision. The six musicians appealed but the union turned them down, stating that they had not fulfilled their contractual agreements and so the orchestra had the right not to renew their contracts. Walter Murdoch, president of the Toronto Musicians' Association, said that it was "a straight contractual matter" and "there is nothing wrong in the orchestra's not rehiring musicians".

On May 26, 1952 twelve members of the TSO board met to review their decision not to renew the contracts. Nine of the members voted in favor of the decision while three voted against it. It was decided that the contracts would not be renewed, but if the United States immigration officials would issue entry permits to the six musicians by September 1, the TSO would renew the contracts. This decision created a controversy and a split within the TSO board, which eventually led to the resignation of two members, Mrs. Edmund Boyd and Mrs. R. B. Whitehead, although these two remained members of the orchestra's women's committee.

The Assembly for the Canadian Arts called a rally in support of the Symphony Six on May 29. The Toronto Musicians' Association instructed its members not to attend and sent members to stand outside the entrance "to intimidate members from entering". Aspersions were cast on the Assembly for the Canadian Arts as being a communist front organization, and the Toronto Evening Telegram called the gathering "a communist meeting". Several members of the Assembly quit the group in fear "of being labelled communists". On June 4 the United Church of Canada urged the TSO board to reconsider its decision.

The controversy continued into the orchestra's 1952-1953 season. The six musicians appealed again to the TSO board and the Toronto Musicians' Association, but made no headway. The musicians also held meetings with the Canadian Civil Liberties Association and the Toronto Board of Control, and pleaded their case to the Mayor of Toronto, Allan A. Lamport, and the American Federation of Musicians, without success. While the Federation of Canadian Artists and the Canada Council for the Arts supported the six musicians, the Canadian Congress of Labour rejected a proposal to back them. In 1952 then-Canadian foreign minister Lester Pearson was quoted as saying that it would not "serve any useful purpose to take the matter up again". Pearson blamed the Cold War for such incidents, and added that the Canadian government was also denying entries to people wishing to attend communist meetings and was providing US officials with "security information". A special committee was set up by the TSO board to screen all its members.

MacMillan stayed out of the matter; he did not attend meetings of the TSO board and maintained a public silence through the spring and summer of 1952. According to TSO archivist Warren, MacMillan's correspondence indicates that he supported the board's decision not to rehire the six musicians.

While the Symphony Six garnered support from many corners, they did not receive widespread support from their peers. While some orchestra members were "genuinely supportive", according to Budd, many others publicly shunned them for fear of being perceived as communist sympathizers and losing their own jobs.

== Aftermath ==
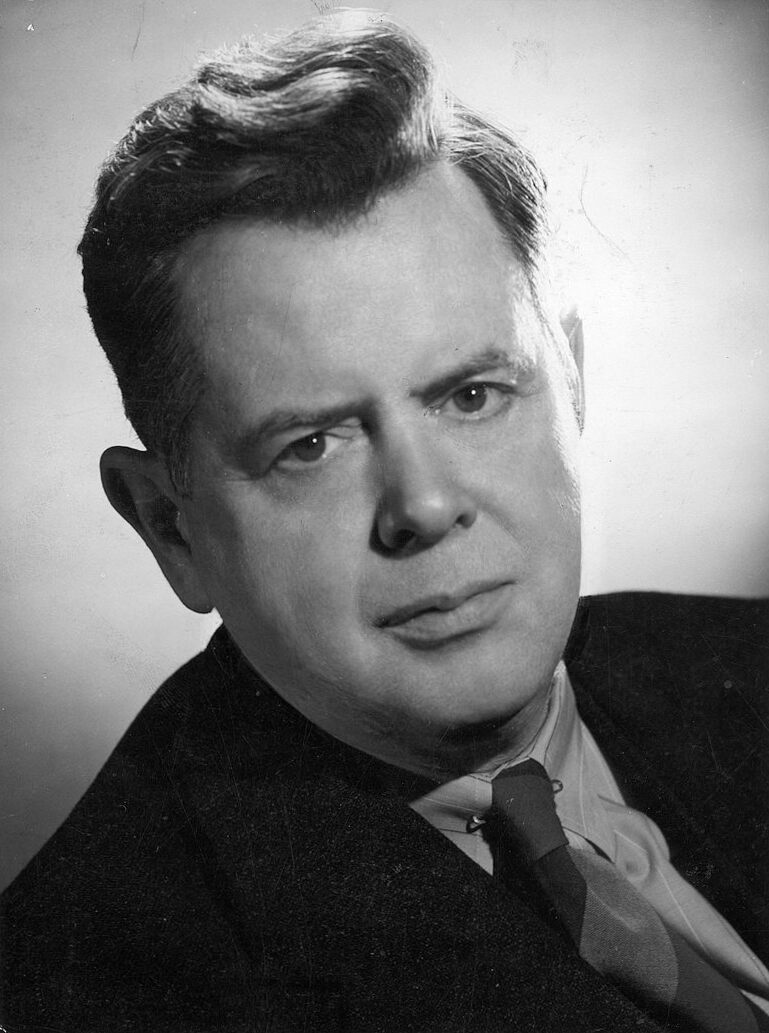
Ernest MacMillan's response to the Symphony Six incident brought him criticism

Only two of the Symphony Six eventually returned to the Toronto Symphony Orchestra: Ruth Budd and Stephen Staryk. After her contract was not renewed, Budd played with orchestras in Halifax and other Canadian cities. She was rehired by the TSO in 1964 and continued as a double bassist until 1989, becoming "one of the most beloved members of the orchestra". Staryk played in the CBC Symphony Orchestra from 1952 to 1956 and then traveled to London, where he was appointed concertmaster of the Royal Philharmonic Orchestra. In 1960 he became concertmaster of the Royal Concertgebouw Orchestra in Amsterdam and toured the US with them, although he had not been officially cleared by the US immigration department. Staryk was the first Canadian concertmaster of the Chicago Symphony Orchestra from 1963 to 1967. He returned to the Toronto Symphony Orchestra in 1982, serving as concertmaster until 1986.

Keetbaas became the principal flautist for the Winnipeg Symphony Orchestra and the CBC Winnipeg Orchestra from 1953 to 1968. From 1956 to 1966 he directed and performed with the Dirk Keetbaas Players, a wind quintet featuring flute, oboe, clarinet, bassoon, and French horn.

Kuinka performed with the Toronto Renaissance Quintet from 1963 to 1965. In 1964 he formed the Toronto Mandolin Chamber Ensemble, which existed until 1969. He also performed with the orchestra of the National Ballet of Canada. He received a research grant from the Canada Council to study European teaching methods and repertoire in 1966.

Mannheim later performed in the Vancouver Symphony Orchestra and the Rochester Philharmonic Orchestra.

Moskalyk joined the Faculty of Music at the University of Toronto and also became a faculty member of The Royal Conservatory of Music.

The TSO board had not renewed the musicians' contracts hoping that it would receive more concert invitations from the United States. However, it received only eight invitations in the following four years, all from the state of Michigan. The eighth tour had to be cancelled because of a snowstorm.

In a letter written to Dan Cameron, President of the Canadian Federation of Music Teachers, in November 1952, MacMillan reflected that "the orchestra, far from suffering musically, has in some respects improved."

== See also ==
- Human rights in Canada
- McCarthyism

== Bibliography ==
- Pitman, Walter (2006). Music Makers: The Lives of Harry Freedman & Mary Morrison. Toronto: Dundurn Group. ISBN 978-1-55002-589-7. OCLC 68134572.
- Schabas, Ezra (1994). Sir Ernest MacMillan: The Importance of Being Canadian. Toronto: University of Toronto Press. ISBN 978-0-8020-2849-5. OCLC 244766482.
- Scher, Len (1992). The Un-Canadians: true stories of the Blacklist Era. Toronto: Lester Pub. ISBN 978-1-8955-5518-9. OCLC 25092033.
- Warren, Richard S. (2002). Begins with the Oboe: A History of the Toronto Symphony Orchestra. Toronto: University of Toronto Press. ISBN 978-0-8020-3588-2. OCLC 244768224.
