= Philip Downs =

British music historian (1928–2014)

Philip G. Downs
- Born: March 5, 1928; Leeds, England
- Died: January 5, 2014 (aged 85); London, Ontario, Canada
- Spouse(s): Marianne (Bell) (m. 1959; died 1965) Anne (Leggatt) (m. 1974)
- Children: 3

Academic background
- Education: Leeds University (BA); Royal College of Music (BMus); University of Toronto (MusM, PhD Musicology)

Academic work
- Discipline: Classical music
- Institutions: University of Western Ontario; University of Melbourne
- Notable works: The Creative World of Beethoven, Classical Music: The Era of Haydn, Mozart and Beethoven

Philip George Downs (March 5, 1928 – January 5, 2014) was a British musicologist and music historian who was among the leading and pioneering music historians of the Classical era of music. His published works on the analysis and significance of the music of Haydn, Mozart, and Beethoven served as the basis of study for many music scholars.

== Career ==
Downs taught at University of Melbourne from 1965 to 1969. He then accepted a professorship at University of Western Ontario in London, Canada, where he remained from 1969 to 2014.

His principal publications were of central importance to the understanding of the Classical era of music.

In 1970, Downs contributed his extended paper analyzing the first movement of Beethoven's Eroica Symphony, "Beethoven's 'New Way' and the 'Eroica' ", published in a special edition of The Musical Quarterly in 1970, the Beethoven bicentennial. The issue was also published separately in hardcover as The Creative World of Beethoven edited by Paul Henry Lang. Downs placed Beethoven's comment about his "new way" of composing to the year 1802 to 1803 (when the Third Symphony was begun). He further demonstrated how this new style of composition was used in the Eroica symphony first movement, depicting a purgatorial pathway through psychological challenges to a higher state of purification, yet still operating within the classical forms. This paper is a much referenced source for Eroica analysis, with about 42 citations currently in published research.

Downs was commissioned to write a major volume for the Norton Introduction to Music History series. The book, Classical Music : The Era of Haydn, Mozart and Beethoven, was published in 1992 and extended to 720 pages, including analysis and new insights into the major works of Haydn, Mozart and Beethoven, an era which Downs described as the "Golden Age" of music. The book was subject to republishing in several languages, including Chinese, Italian, and Spanish. Music history courses at universities often refer to this book for course study and it is a staple resource in music libraries. The book currently appears in 7 editions in 862 libraries in North America.

Downs authored several articles in The Canadian Encyclopedia, including Clifford Evens, Music in London, Clifford von Custer, and Martin Boundy.

Downs authored the notes and historical articles for concert programs of the London Symphony Orchestra, later known as Orchestra London.

Downs was Chairman of Music History at University of Western Ontario from 1985 to 1993. The Faculty of Music at Western developed a PhD program in Musicology and Music History in 1987.

The Philip Downs Scholarship in Music History, University of Western Ontario, was established in his name beginning in 2008.
