= Piano Six =

Piano Six "New Generation"
- Founded: 2018
- Type: Non-profit, Interest group
- Website: www.pianosix.com

Piano Six :the new generation is a collective of six Canadian pianists. Adopting the model of the original Piano Six founded by Janina Fialkowska and managed for ten years by Jane Colwell this new organization launched in 2018 includes pianists Marika Bournaki, David Jalbert, Angela Park, Ian Parker, Anastasia Rizikov and Daniel Vnukowski.

Between the months of April and November each year, one pianist performs in a regional tour within a two-week time span. Each pianist's visit includes a recital and one or more outreach events. The outreach events can be in the form of a concert for schools, a public masterclass or a special workshop for music teachers.

== History ==
=== Founding and early history ===
Piano Six was founded in 1994 by the Polish-Canadian pianist Janina Fialkowska. The other members of Piano Six were Angela Cheng, Marc-André Hamelin, Angela Hewitt, André Laplante, and Jon Kimura Parker.

=== Locations (1994-2004) ===
Since Piano Six's first season in 1994, the pianists have performed in such remote Canadian communities as Squamish, British Columbia, Irma, Alberta, Arctic Bay, Nunavut, North Bay, Ontario, Dalhousie, New Brunswick and Wolfville, Nova Scotia, reaching approximately 100,000 Canadians over its 10 year duration.

=== Subsequent developments ===
In 2004 the Piano Six association changed its name and operated as Encore Six, before renaming once again to Piano Plus in 2005. During those years, it included non-keyboard performers on its tours, such as singers. In 2018, Daniel Vnukowski relaunched the original Piano Six project using a different set of pianists under the slogan "New Generation".

=== Ensemble ===
The pianists of Piano Six occasionally appear together as an ensemble in addition to their individual touring circuits. Past examples have included an appearance at the Ottawa Chamber Music Festival in 2000 and at the Festival international de Lanaudière in 1999.
