= Ernest MacMillan =

Canadian conductor (1893–1973)

Sir Ernest MacMillan CC
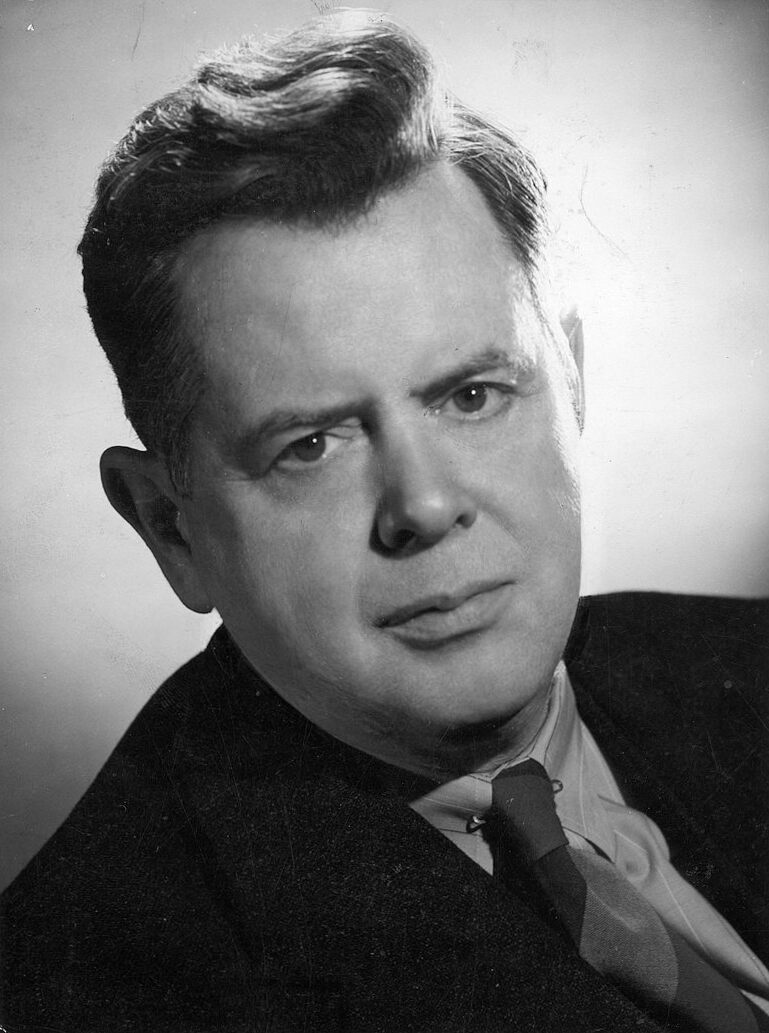
- MacMillan in 1940

Background information
- Born: Ernest Alexander Campbell MacMillan; 18 August 1893; Mimico, Ontario, Canada
- Died: 6 May 1973 (aged 79) Toronto, Ontario, Canada
- Occupations: Composer, conductor, administrator, lecturer, adjudicator, writer, humourist, statesman
- Instrument: Organ
- Years active: 1919–1973

Sir Ernest Alexander Campbell MacMillan (18 August 1893 – 6 May 1973) was a Canadian conductor, composer and organist. He was Canada's only "Musical Knight", and is widely regarded as being Canada's pre-eminent musician from the 1920s through the 1950s. His contributions to the development of music in Canada were sustained and varied, as conductor, performer, composer, administrator, lecturer, adjudicator, writer, humourist, and statesman.

== Biography ==
=== Early life and education (1893–1914) ===
Ernest Alexander Campbell MacMillan was born in Mimico (Etobicoke), Ontario, the first-born of Reverend Alexander MacMillan (1864-1961), and Wilhelmina "Minnie" Ross (1870-1932). His parents had moved to Mimico the previous December, when Rev. MacMillan, educated in Edinburgh, Scotland, was called to be the first resident minister of Mimico Presbyterian Church, that had been formed in 1889. His mother, was a third generation of ministers daughters from Scotland, and in her case from Pictou, Nova Scotia.

His first musical influences were his parents. From a very young age, he became fascinated while watching his mother play piano and decided to learn music. His father, who became minister at Toronto's St. Enoch's Presbyterian Church in 1895, bought an organ for a new house the family moved to in 1898. The house had an adjoined drawing room and study room, with enough space for both an organ and piano. Thereafter, Macmillan was officially hooked.

Macmillan started studying the organ at the age of 8 with Arthur Blakely. A child prodigy, he gave his first organ recital at the age of ten. His talents astonished the public and critics alike in 1904 when he performed in the "Festival of Lillies", which "firmly established him a prodigy". 4000 people were known to attend. Moreover, he was the appointed organist at St. Enoch's, which gave him a sense of importance and great experience in accompanying singers. Between 1908 and 1910, MacMillan held his first professional appointment as an organist and choirmaster in Toronto at Knox (Presbyterian) Church. In 1910 he had his first official organ recital. After that, he performed elsewhere in Toronto and environs until 1914, including St. Paul's Presbyterian Church (Hamilton, Ontario). He earned the associateship and fellowship diplomas of the Royal College of Organists, and from 1911 to 1914 studied modern history at the University of Toronto, earning his BA. He was a member of the Canadian fraternity, Phi Kappa Pi.

=== Internment in Germany (1914–1919) ===
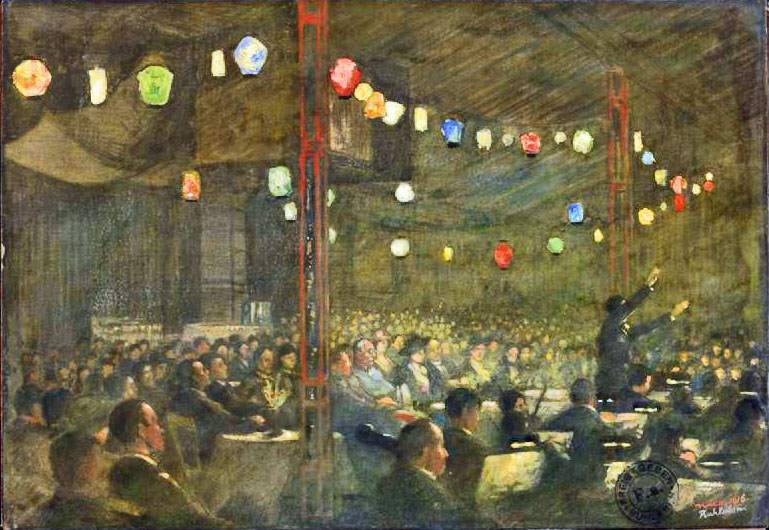
Gala performance of The Mikado at the Ruhleben internment camp

MacMillan travelled to Paris in the spring of 1914 and began to study piano privately with Thérèse Chaigneau. He was visiting Bayreuth, Germany, to attend performances of the Bayreuth Festival, when the First World War began in August, following the assassination of Archduke Franz Ferdinand of Austria on 28 June. MacMillan was initially detained by the German police, and then imprisoned as an enemy alien, as Canada had declared war on Imperial Germany on 5 August. MacMillan was subsequently interned for the duration of the war at Ruhleben, a British civilian detention camp, located on the site of a former horse racing track, on the outskirts of Berlin. During this period, he became a prominent member of the Ruhleben Musical Society and directed performances of The Mikado (with orchestra) and a pantomime version of Cinderella. MacMillan transcribed the music for the former from memory with the help of four other musicians, including Benjamin Dale. Among those attending these performances was James W. Gerard, the United States Ambassador to Germany. MacMillan was also a member of the Ruhleben Drama Society and acted in productions of Othello, Twelfth Night, and The Importance of Being Earnest. MacMillan gave lectures on each of the nine symphonies of Beethoven; at the end of each lecture, MacMillan and Dale would perform a four hand piano arrangement of the symphony under discussion. MacMillan was later interviewed about his experiences as an internee at Ruhleben, as part of a series of CBC interviews with Canadian First World War veterans.

== Career ==
=== As a conductor ===
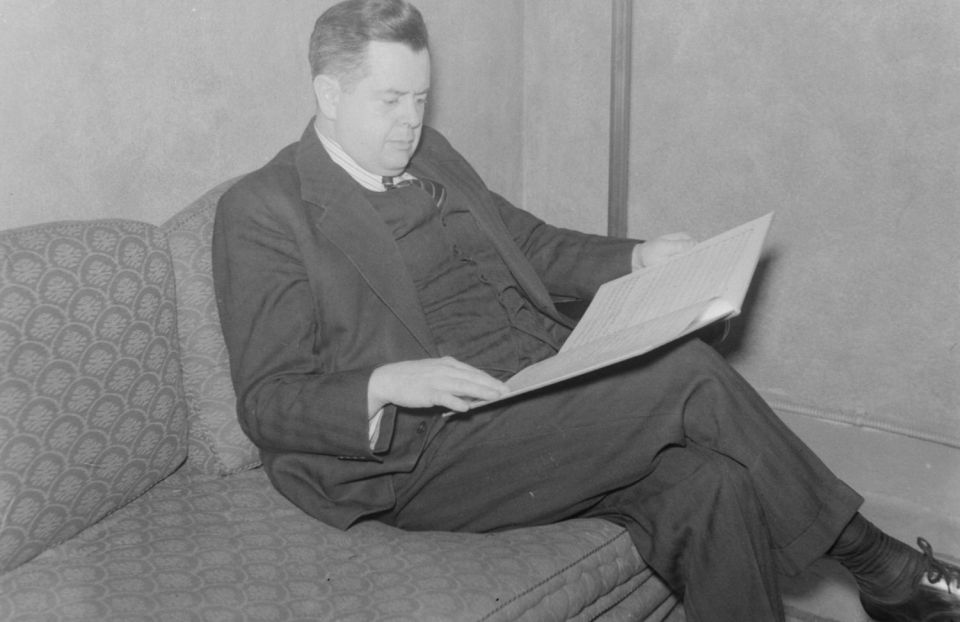
MacMillan in 1941 in Toronto

Upon return to Canada in 1919, MacMillan was appointed organist and choirmaster in Toronto at the Timothy Eaton Memorial Church (then Methodist), where he served until the consummation of the United Church of Canada in June 1925. He was especially known there for his performances of Handel's Messiah and Brahms' Requiem His career as a conductor truly began when he conducted a performance of Bach's St. Matthew Passion in the Timothy Eaton Memorial Church in 1923. MacMillan conducted annual performances of this work for the next 30 years. Another annual tradition Macmillan initiated during his career includes the Toronto Mendelssohn Choir's Christmas-time performance of Handel's Messiah.

Throughout his time with the Toronto Symphony Orchestra, MacMillan accomplished many of the major achievements of his conducting career. His authority as a composer influenced some major changes within the orchestra. During the Depression, he changed the concert times from 5 pm to a more "evening hour".

As many theatre musicians were out of work during the Depression era, MacMillan hired them to play in these evening concerts on a regular basis. As a result, MacMillan was able to select much more ambitious repertoire for this stronger performing force, as well as lengthening its season, and increased their number of concerts.

MacMillan tried to make concerts fun and entertaining. The Christmas Box Symphony Concerts were a great example of this. Not only did MacMillan conduct, but he dressed up as Santa Claus and had the audience participate by singing along. He also "appeared in overalls with a monkey wrench for a baton to conduct Alexander Mosolov's Iron Foundry".

The entry of Canada into WWII proved to be "a difficult period", but it was during the post-war years that his conducting was regaled as being "the most successful in the Toronto Symphony Orchestra's history". MacMillan innovations in his repertoire changed yet again. He included Canadian music, as well as works by Hungarian and Russian composers Béla Bartók, and Dmitri Shostakovich.

During World War II, he gained fame as a guest conductor in the United States. He conducted many Hollywood Bowl concerts, and the National Broadcasting Company Symphony Orchestra in NYC. In Canada, he guest-conducted the Montreal Symphony Orchestra and the Vancouver Symphony Orchestra. By the end of the 1940s, he had conducted the Vancouver Symphony on 45 different occasions, and 25 different occasions in Montreal. MacMillan toured Australia as well for three months and conducted 30 concerts in Sydney, Melbourne and Brisbane.

Later in his career (1948–1953), MacMillan introduced Canada to entirely new prospects of recording and broadcasting. A good number of performances he conducted were recorded for Beaver Records; these were also broadcast nationally by CBC Radio. However, his silence over the Symphony Six issue prompted criticism.

=== As a composer ===
While a prisoner in Ruhleben, MacMillan wrote what is seen to be his most significant composition, titled String Quartet in C-minor. Influenced by the "war-time style and themes", the first performance of this piece was heard on 8 February 1925, by the Hart House String Quartet, and was conducted by MacMillan himself. Although MacMillan's composing abilities were much praised during this performance, he stated composition was not his main preoccupation; he preferred conducting to composing.

Nevertheless, not only did the musical language of the 19th century romantic period influence MacMillan, but he was interested in Folklore music also. In 1927, he travelled alongside Marius Barbeau to the Nass River region of British Columbia to "hear, record and notate music of the Tsimshian People". As a result, he composed Three Songs of the West Coast, arranged for voice and piano.

MacMillan composed less during his commitment to the Toronto Symphony Orchestra. Still, he managed to compose Scottish and French songs for the ballad opera "Prince Charming". In addition, he composed Te Deum Landamus in E Minor (1936) and Song of Deliverance (1944), both choral works.

His only work composed strictly for the organ was named Cortège académique. In 1953, he was asked both to compose and to perform it at the University College in Toronto.

Apart from composing his own works, MacMillan made arrangements of works by composers such as Bach, Beethoven, Handel, and Tchaikovsky, all of whom he said had great influence on his style. Both Canadian and US orchestras have performed his orchestra arrangement of Bach's Prelude and Fugue in C Minor.

=== As a performer ===
MacMillan became well known in Toronto music circles after he first started giving performances in his earlier career. Upon returning to Canada after the war, MacMillan relaunched his later career as a performer by giving 5 organ recitals commissioned by the Canadian Academy of Music from November 1919 to March 1920. In addition, he gave recitals at the Timothy Eaton Memorial Church after each Sunday service. MacMillan gave "all Bach recitals" which attracted members of the congregation and Toronto musicians.

CBC Radio in the 1920s helped to heighten MacMillan's talent as a performer. Thus, he became acknowledged as far west as Vancouver. He was frequently asked to perform there, as well as in the United States, and at the 1935 Convention of the Royal College of Organists in Toronto.

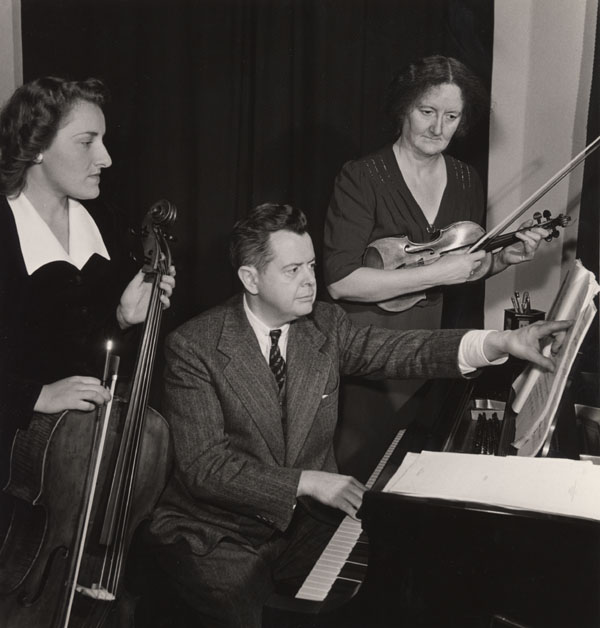
The Canadian Trio (left to right: Zara Nelsova, Sir Ernest MacMillan, Kathleen Parlow).

In the early 1940s, MacMillan formed "The Canadian Trio". Alongside musicians Zara Nelsova (cellist) and Kathleen Parlow (violinist), MacMillan often performed in Toronto and occasionally elsewhere. Amazingly, they once performed Beethoven's Triple Concerto in C Major with the Toronto Symphony Orchestra at Massey Hall. Furthermore, MacMillan founded "The Canadian Duo" with Kathleen Parlow; their performances were broadcast on CBC Radio as well.

MacMillan gave 100 concerts and recitals between the 1920s and 1950s. He eventually stopped performing due to his other responsibilities as a conductor, composer and an educator.

=== As an educator ===
Throughout his professional life, MacMillan put emphasis on music education, and "contributed to the foundations of the development of music in Canada." In the year 1919, MacMillan was selected for a staff position at the Canadian Academy of Music, though he had little training in teaching. He taught theory, harmony, counterpoint, piano and organ. MacMillan was sent to lead examination tours at McGill University in Southern Ontario, and in various parts of the west coast on the Academy's behalf.

Eventually, MacMillan was appointed the Dean of the Faculty of Music at the University of Toronto. He made many innovations during his tenure with its music department. He then established a conservatory choir in 1927, because he felt that the vocal students "needed experience in choral singing". He also started the first opera classes at the conservatory in 1920, with performances of Hansel and Gretel, The Sorcerer, Dido and Aeneas and Hugh the Drover. He improved the library, made improvements to the college's sight reading/ear tests, and prepared teaching materials which include "The Modern Piano Student" in 1931 and "On the Preparation of Ear Tests" in 1938.

MacMillan was interested as well in youth education. He worked in children's concerts and secondary school concerts, which were presented by the Toronto Symphony Orchestra. To enrich children's musical experience, he introduced a series called "Music for Young Folk" in 1942. Focusing on all primary, junior and senior levels, the program ran for 45 minutes with soloists accompanied by the Toronto Symphony Orchestra.

Alongside composing, conducting and performing, MacMillan became recognized internationally as an adjudicator starting in 1924, when he adjudicated for the Ottawa Music Festival. In 1937, he was the first Canadian to adjudicate at the National Eisteddfod of Wales; and he adjudicated at various festivals in Jamaica and the United States.

=== Honours and awards ===
On June 3, 1935, For his "services to music in Canada", MacMillan was knighted by King George V, during the Silver Jubilee on the recommendation of the Prime Minister of Canada, R. B. Bennett. He and eight other Canadians were so honoured, and announced at 1935 Birthday Honours, on the King's 70th Birthday. Earlier in the year, MacMillan had composed a hymn for the Silver Jubilee and Birthday.

He became an honorary member of the Royal Academy of Music in 1938, and was made a recipient of the University of Alberta National Award in Music (1952). MacMillan received the Canada Council Medal twice (1964 and 1973) for "outstanding achievements in the arts, humanities or social sciences".

The University of Toronto's Faculty of Music received a new facility in 1964, named the new theatre "The MacMillan Theatre". It holds up to 815 people, and the orchestra pit is large enough to sit 60 musicians.

Honorary degrees conferred upon MacMillan, include:

- 1936, LL. D. University of British Columbia, Vancouver, BC,
- 1941, LL. D., Queen's University at Kingston, Kingston, Ontario,
- 1947, Mus. D., Laval University, Quebec City,
- 1948, Litt. D, McMaster University, Hamilton, Ontario,
- 1953, LL. D., University of Toronto.

An Elementary School was named in his honour in Scarborough, Ontario in 1978. It is now part of the Toronto District School Board.

MacMillan's sons, Keith and Ross MacMillan, established the Sir Ernest MacMillan Memorial Foundation. The annual award is endowed with $7,500.

Sir Ernest MacMillan died in Toronto on May 6, 1973. He is buried along with family at Toronto's Mount Pleasant Cemetery.

== The Sir Ernest MacMillan Collection at Library and Archives Canada ==
=== Background ===
The collection of Sir Ernest MacMillan's personal papers and music was established in the Music Archives, of the National Library of Canada, in Ottawa, Ontario, in 1984. The Sir Ernest MacMillan Collection is now included as part of the overall collections of Library and Archives Canada (LAC). This new organization which was created 21 May 2004, by Order of the Governor in Council, through the merger of the National Library of Canada and the National Archives of Canada.

The Sir Ernest MacMillan Collection at Library and Archives Canada consists of 21.7 linear metres of material.

A Finding aid for the Collection written by Curator Maureen Nevins, is available:. -- "Numerical List of the Sir Ernest MacMillan Fonds". -- Ottawa: National Library of Canada. -- November 1992. 435 p. (unpublished).

=== Sir Ernest MacMillan (1893–1973): Portrait of a Canadian Musician ===
A special Exhibition, Sir Ernest MacMillan (1893–1973): Portrait of a Canadian Musician was mounted by the former National Library of Canada from 17 October 1994 to 12 March 1995. The Exhibition's Curator, Maureen Nevins, wrote that MacMillan's "story should be known by all aspiring Canadian musicians and students of Canadian culture as a model of personal achievement and service to profession and country".

== The Sir Ernest MacMillan Memorial Foundation ==
The Sir Ernest MacMillan Memorial Foundation (Fondation commémorative Sir Ernest MacMillan) was founded in 1984 by Sir Ernest's sons, Keith and Ross MacMillan, with a donation from the MacMillan family. Additional funds have been obtained through the generosity of other donors.

The principal goal of the Foundation is to assist young musicians in their advanced education at the graduate level and in so doing commemorate MacMillan and his unique career.

In 1993, the Foundation played a major role in celebrating the centenary of Sir Ernest's birth. The Foundation encouraged many commemorative activities throughout the country, and collaborated with the Music Division of the former National Library of Canada in presenting at Roy Thompson Hall part of the Library's comprehensive MacMillan exhibit.

The Foundation accepts donations from individuals and organizations interested in furthering the musical arts in Canada through its awards program.

== Examples of MacMillan's recordings and music ==
MacMillan conducted the Toronto Symphony Orchestra in two films produced by the National Film Board of Canada in 1945. In the first film, Toronto Symphony No. 1 the TSO performed Jamaican Rhumba, À St. Malo (one of MacMillan's own compositions), and the overture to the opera Colas Breugnon. The film is 12 minutes in length. In the second film, Toronto Symphony No. 2, the TSO performed the third movement of Pyotr Ilyich Tchaikovsky's Sixth Symphony in B Minor. The film is 9 minutes in length. In 1942, MacMillan conducted the Toronto Symphony Orchestra (TSO) in a recording of the orchestral suite The Planets, by Gustav Holst, recorded on 78 RPM phonograph records, for RCA Victor. During the Second World War, MacMillan conducted the TSO in a recording of Pomp and Circumstance March No. 2, by Sir Edward Elgar, recorded on 78 RPM phonograph records, for RCA Victor. This was reportedly the first recording of this work made outside of the United Kingdom. MacMillan conducted the TSO in a number of recordings with Canadian pianist Glenn Gould as soloist, playing works by various composers, including Johann Sebastian Bach and Ludwig van Beethoven. An RCA Victor recording by the TSO of Tchaikovsky's fifth symphony was also issued by their budget label, RCA Camden.

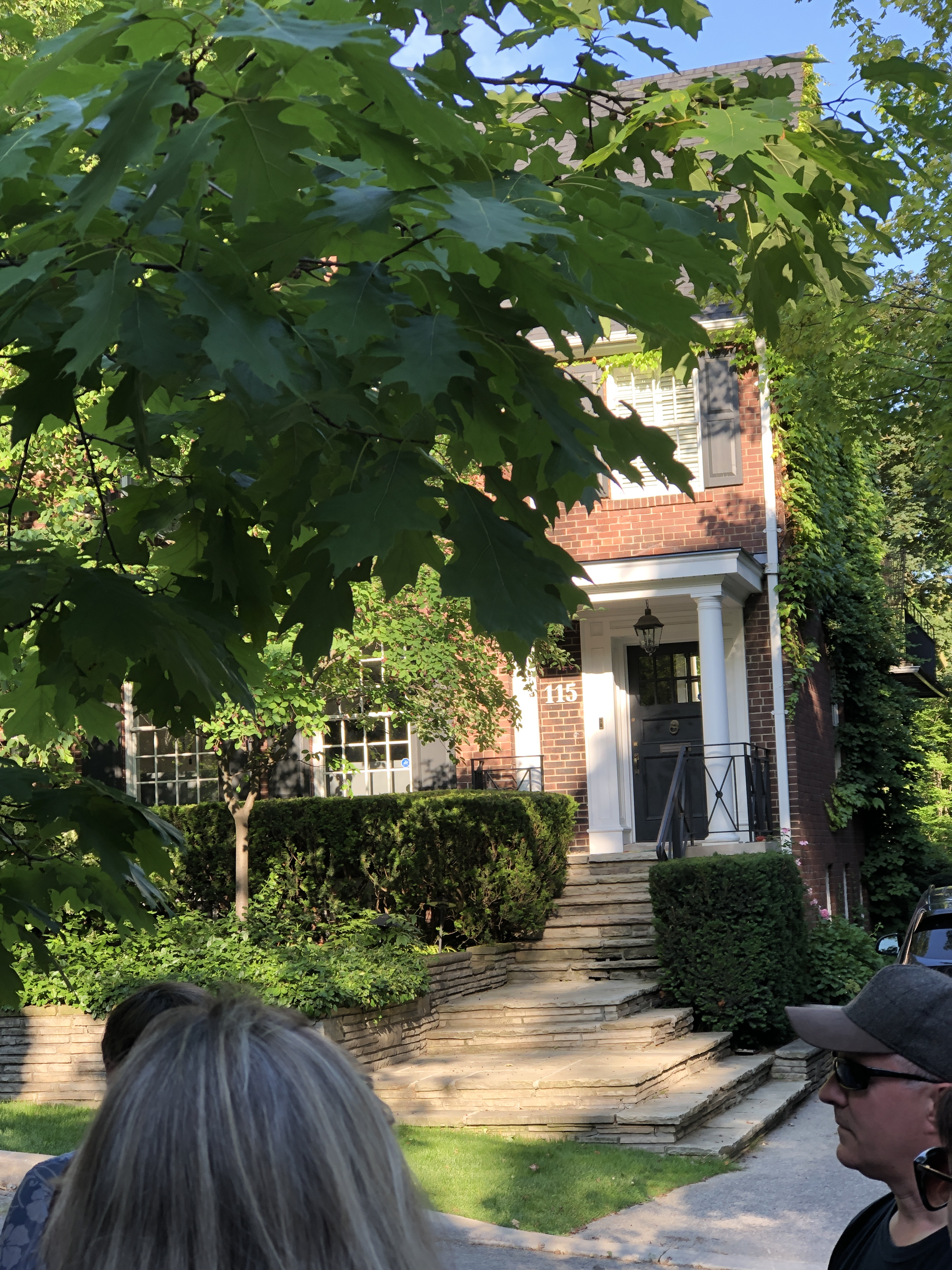
House constructed for Sir Ernest MacMillan in 1931

== Sir Ernest MacMillan Home ==
What is now referred to as the Sir Ernest MacMillan Home was constructed in 1931 for Ernest MacMillan and his wife Elsie née Keith in the Rosedale area of Toronto. The house is designated a heritage property.

== Citations and references ==
- Bach-cantatas.com Sir Ernest MacMillan biography
- Beckwith, John (4 March 2015). "Sir Ernest MacMillan". The Canadian Encyclopedia. Historica Canada. Archived from the original on 12 October 2006.
- Moore, Christopher; Wardrop, Patricia (16 December 2013). "Sir Ernest MacMillan Memorial Foundation". The Canadian Encyclopedia. Historica Canada.

=== Cited sources ===
- Schabas, Ezra (1994). Sir Ernest MacMillan: The Importance of Being Canadian. University of Toronto Press. ISBN 978-0-8020-2849-5.
- MacMillan, Sir Ernest (1997). MacMillan on Music: Essays on Music. Dundurn. ISBN 978-1-55002-285-8.
- Nevins, Maureens (1994). Sir Ernest MacMillan: Portrait of A Canadian Musician. National Library of Canada. ISBN 0-662-61311-2.
- McCready, Louise G. (1957). Famous Musicians: MacMillan, Johnson, Pelletier, Willan. Clarke, Irwin. ISBN 978-0-7720-0502-1.
- MacMillan, Ernest (1955). Music in Canada. Toronto: Toronto University Press.
