= Janina Fialkowska =

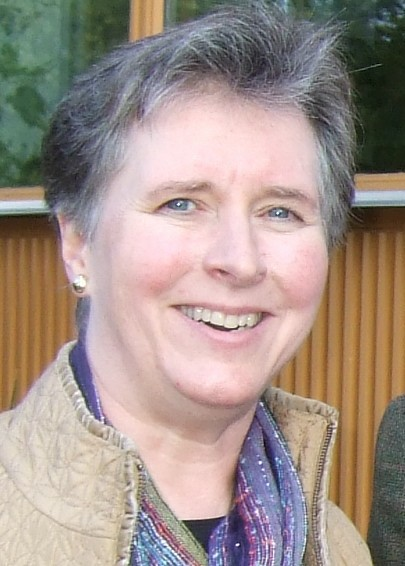
- Janina Fialkowska in 2008

Background information
- Born: May 7, 1951 (age 75)
- Origin: Montreal, Quebec, Canada
- Occupation: Musician
- Instrument: Piano
- Years active: 1963–present
- Website: www.fialkowska.com

Janina Fialkowska, OC (born May 7, 1951) is a Canadian classical pianist. A specialist of the Classic and Romantic repertoires, for more than thirty years she has appeared regularly with professional orchestras around the world, often performing the music of Chopin, and also contemporary Polish composers including Lutosławski and Panufnik. In 1990, she gave the world premier performance of the then-recently discovered Franz Liszt Third Piano Concerto with the Chicago Symphony Orchestra.

== Biography ==
=== Early life ===
Fialkowska was born in Montreal, Quebec, to a Canadian mother (Bridget Todd Fialkowski) and a Polish father (Jerzy Fialkowski), an engineer and Polish army officer who emigrated to Canada in 1945. Her mother, of Scottish-Irish and Cree descent, studied piano, in a class setting, with Alfred Cortot at the École Normale de Musique de Paris (1935–1939). Fialkowska is the granddaughter of John Todd, Canada's first professor of parasitology, and great-granddaughter of Edward Clouston, President of the Canadian Bankers Association. She is the cousin of former Canadian cabinet minister David Anderson and cousin of stage and screen actor Christopher Plummer.

Fialkowska began to study piano at the age of four with her mother and in 1960 enrolled in the École Vincent-d'Indy in Montreal. In 1963, at the age of 12, she made her debut as a soloist with the Montreal Symphony Orchestra and began studying with Yvonne Hubert. She pursued her secondary education at the Montreal girls school The Study, graduating in 1967. The following year, at the age of 17, she simultaneously obtained undergraduate (Baccalauréat) and Maitrise degrees from the Université de Montréal. During this period, she also studied in Paris with virtuoso and teacher Yvonne Lefébure (1966, 1968–1969). In 1969 she was awarded 1st Prize in the CBC National Radio Competition for Young Performers in Canada and travelled occasionally to New York City for private studies with Sasha Gorodnitzki. In 1970, she settled in New York and enrolled in the Juilliard School of Music as a student of Sascha Gorodnitzki, later becoming his teaching assistant from 1979 to 1984.

In 1974, while enrolled in law school in Montreal, Fialkowska participated in the inaugural Arthur Rubinstein International Piano Master Competition in Tel Aviv. Unbeknownst to her, one of the judges gave her a zero in order to help his own student advance. But Rubinstein himself, then 87, was impressed by her playing. When he found out about the zero, he threatened to withdraw his name from the competition unless Fialkowska advanced. Rubinstein became her mentor and launched her international career, hailing her as "a born Chopin interpreter."

=== Professional career ===
In 1986, to commemorate the centennial of the death of Franz Liszt, Fialkowska was invited to perform his complete Transcendental Études in New York, Chicago, Los Angeles, in London for the BBC, and in Canada for the CBC. In 1990, she was chosen to perform, with the Chicago Symphony, the world premiere of the recently discovered Third Piano Concerto of Franz Liszt.

Fialkowska has also given world premiere performances of piano concertos by American composer Libby Larsen, with the Minnesota Orchestra (1991) and by Canadian composer Marjan Mozetich, with the Kingston Symphony (2000).

In 1992, the Colorado Symphony invited her to perform the North American premiere of the piano concerto by Sir Andrzej Panufnik. Also in 1992, the Canadian Broadcasting Corporation produced a television documentary of her life and career, entitled The World of Janina Fialkowska, which was aired across Canada and was awarded a special jury prize at the San Francisco International Film Festival.

In January 2002, on the eve of a European concert tour, Fialkowska's career was interrupted by the discovery of an aggressive cancerous tumour in her upper left arm. Following the removal of the malignant mass in May 2002, she subsequently underwent an innovative surgical procedure designed to reconstruct the arm that had been rendered almost useless by the excision of the tumour. During her eighteen months of convalescence, she gave many concerts in Europe and North America, performing music written especially for the left hand by Ravel (Concerto for the Left Hand) and Prokofiev (Piano Concerto no. 4), which she adapted for performance with the right hand. Both the public and the critics praised her courage and the high calibre of these performances such as with the Houston Symphony Orchestra under Stanislaw Skrowaczewski.

In 2004, Fialkowska returned to the stage as a two-handed pianist, first with a recital in Germany, followed by Beethoven's Fourth Piano Concerto in Toronto. Since then, she has resumed active touring in Canada, the United States, Europe, and the Far East performing amongst others with the Warsaw Philharmonic, the Montreal Symphony, the Toronto Symphony, the Suk Chamber Orchestra Prague, the Vancouver Symphony, the Detroit Symphony, the Royal Philharmonic Orchestra, the Mexico State Orchestra, L'orchestra di Camera Italiana, the Badische Staatskapelle, the Osaka Philharmonic and many others.

In the summer of 2010, Fialkowska hosted a celebration of the works of Chopin at the Festival of the Sound. In 2018, her album Chopin Recital 3 won a Juno Award for Classical Album of the Year.

Fialkowska has also garnered praise for her interpretations of the works of Chopin and Liszt.

== Personal life ==
Fialkowska has been married to German music manager Harry Oesterle since 2001. They have homes in Connecticut and Bavaria. Her autobiography, A Note In Time, was published by Novum.

== Piano Six and Piano Plus ==
Janina Fialkowska was the founder and first artistic director of Piano Six, a not-for-profit educational outreach program dedicated to supporting classical music in small communities throughout Canada. In 1993, Fialkowska convinced five well-known Canadian classical pianists to join with her in a tour of outlying communities that rarely host internationally known musicians. In order to serve as many communities as possible, Fialkowska and the other Piano Six artists agreed to perform for a fraction of their usual fees.

During its decade of operation (1993–2003), this program sent its artists on more than 60 regional tours, reaching over 100,000 Canadians of all ages with live performances, masterclasses and teachers' workshops. In 2004, in order to broaden the scope of its activities, the Piano Six roster was expanded to include Canadian musicians from the fields of strings and voice as well as piano. Under the banner of Piano Plus, the program's associated artists continued to tour until 2010.

== Awards and honours ==
- First Prize at the CBC National Radio Competition for Young Performers, 1969.
- Third Prize at the First International Arthur Rubinstein Piano Masters Competition, held in Israel, 1974.
- Officer of the Order of Canada, 2001
- Honorary Doctorate (Music), Acadia University Wolfville (Wolfville, Nova Scotia), 2006
- Paul de Hueck and Norman Walford Career Achievement Award for Keyboard Artistry, 2007
- Governor General's Performing Arts Award for Lifetime Artistic Achievement, 2012.

== Recording career ==
Two of Fialkowska's recordings were nominated by the Canadian music industry for a Juno Award: her 1997 CD Fialkowska plays Szymanowski (ODR 9305) and her 1998 recital of virtuoso salon pieces La Jongleuse (CBC MVCD 1114). Her 2001 recording of Liszt's Transcendental Études (ODR 9332) earned the Critics’ Choice award from American Record Guide. She has also recorded the Liszt Sonata for RCA Red Seal and discs of various works by Chopin for Atma Classique.

In 2007, the uncovering of the Joyce Hatto hoax revealed that Hatto's husband William Barrington Coupe had plagiarised recordings from, among other albums, Fialkowska's 1990 CD of works by Franz Liszt.

== Discography ==
=== Orchestral / Concertos ===
- W.A.Mozart: Piano Concertos, nos. 11 and 12 (chamber version). With The Chamber Players of Canada. Atma Classique SACD2 2531. (2007)
- Frédéric Chopin: Concertos (chamber version). With The Chamber Players of Canada. Atma Classique SACD2 2291. (2005)
- Franz Liszt: Piano Concerti. With the Calgary Philharmonic, cond. Hans Graf. CBC Records, SMCD 5202. (2000)
- Paderewski: Piano Concerto; Fantaisie polonaise. Naxos 8.554020. (1999)
- Memories of Poland: Chopin, Moszkowski, Koprowski. CBC Records, SMCD 5140. (1995)

=== Solo albums ===
- Chopin: Book II (sonatas, impromptus) (2001)
- Transcendental Liszt: Transcendental Études (complete). Opening Day Recordings, ODR 9332. (2000)
- Fialkowska plays Chopin: The Études, opp. 10 & 25. Opening Day Recordings, ODR 9312. (1998)
- La Jongleuse: Salon pieces and encores CBC Records, MVCD 1114. (1998)
- Fialkowska plays Szymanowski: 4 Études; Variations sur un thème folklorique polonais; Métopes; 2 Mazurkas. Opening Day Recordings, ODR 9305. (1995)
- Franz Liszt: Pieces for Piano Solo. CBC Records MVCD 2–1035. (1990)
- Presenting Janina Fialkowska: Liszt solo piano works. RCA Red Seal FRL1-0142. (1977)
- Janina Fialkowska plays Chopin. RCA Red Seal RL-37071 (1977)

=== Collaborator ===
- None But the Lonely Heart: Russian Romances. With soprano Joanne Kolomyjec. CBC Records, MVCD 1144. (2001)
- Brahms/Schumann: Lieder. With bass-baritone Daniel Lichti. Opening Day Recordings, ODR 9311. (1997)
- Schubert: Schwanengesang. With bass-baritone Daniel Lichti. Opening Day Recordings, ODR 9302. (1994)
