= Steven Staryk =

Canadian violinist (born 1932)

- Born: April 27, 1932 (age 94); Toronto, Ontario, Canada
- Genre: Classical
- Occupation: Classical violinist
- Instrument: Violin
- Years active: 1944-2004
- Spouse: Ida Elizabeth (Busch) Staryk (1961; died 2023)

Steven Sam Staryk, OC (born 27 April 1932) is a Canadian violin virtuoso. He had a distinguished solo career and was concertmaster of several major orchestras, the Royal Philharmonic Orchestra, the Amsterdam Concertgebouw Orchestra, the Concertgebouw Chamber Orchestra, the Chicago Symphony Orchestra, and the Toronto Symphony Orchestra. Staryk was offered the concertmaster position with the Berlin Philharmonic Orchestra under Karajan but chose to pursue solo work at that time. He appeared frequently as soloist in violin concertos with these orchestras. Staryk also had an extensive and awarded teaching career.

== Early years ==
Born in Toronto, Ontario, Canada of Ukrainian descent, Staryk began his musical education at 7 years old at the Harbord Collegiate Institute. He pursued further violin studies with Albert Pratz at The Royal Conservatory of Music (Toronto) and in New York City with Mischa Mischakoff, Oscar Shumsky, and Alexander Schneider.

In 1951, he was one of the Symphony Six of the Toronto Symphony Orchestra who were denied permission to enter the United States in the early 1950s, presumably due to his having performed from age 12 to 14 in an orchestra for events of a Ukrainian cultural society in Canada, later alleged to be a front organization. Staryk's early contract with the Toronto Symphony Orchestra was cancelled by the orchestra without explanation and, although he continued to play with the CBC Symphony Orchestra, including a period as the final concertmaster, and the Hart House Orchestra in Toronto, he was forced to seek his further career in Europe.

== Competitions ==
He was runner-up to Salvatore Accardo in the International Competition for Musical Performers in Geneva, 1956. No first prize was awarded that year.

Again, he was runner-up at the Carl Flesch International Competition in London where only one prize is awarded.

== Career ==
He became concertmaster of the Royal Philharmonic Orchestra under Sir Thomas Beecham at the age of 24, the youngest ever, from 1957-1960, earning the title "king of concertmasters" from The Strad magazine. He was recommended by Rafael Kubelik to be concertmaster of the Amsterdam Concertgebouw Orchestra under Bernard Haitink from 1960-1963. Later he was concertmaster of the Concertgebouw Chamber Orchestra, the Chicago Symphony Orchestra under Jean Martinon from 1963-1967, and the Toronto Symphony Orchestra under Sir Andrew Davis from 1982-1987. Staryk performed many violin concertos from the standard repertoire with these orchestras.

Staryk was offered the concertmaster position with the Berlin Philharmonic Orchestra under Karajan in 1963 but chose to pursue independent solo work at that time. Later that same year, George Szell persuaded him to accept the concertmaster position with the Chicago Symphony Orchestra under Martinon. The Chicago Symphony Orchestra concertmaster position allowed Staryk to require of U.S. authorities clarification of his status with respect to the previous blacklisting. His new status as an acceptable performer opened the U.S. as a market for his skills.

Staryk was a well known master teacher and many of his pupils held various positions in major orchestras, chamber groups and professional music schools around the world. He taught at the Amsterdam Conservatory, at Northwestern University and at the American Conservatory in Chicago. He became the youngest full professor at Oberlin Conservatory of Music in Ohio from 1968-1972. He served as head of the string department at the Vancouver Academy of Music from 1972-1975 and taught at the University of Victoria. He also taught at the University of Ottawa.

Staryk joined the Faculty of Music at the University of Western Ontario in London, Ontario, Canada from 1975-1982. While at Western, he formed Quartet Canada with his fellow faculty members pianist Ronald Turini, cellist Tsuyoshi Tsutsumi, and violist Gerald Stanick, performing and recording many piano quartets. He also taught at The Royal Conservatory of Music (Toronto), and the University of Toronto during his time as concertmaster with the Toronto Symphony Orchestra from 1982-1987. His teaching career culminated with the University of Washington in Seattle from 1987-1997. Among his notable students are violinists Gwen Hoebig, Lenny Solomon and composer Marc Sabat.

He was a member of the Oberlin String Quartet, and led the CBC String Quartet and formed the Staryk-Perry Duo (with pianist John Perry). Staryk performed violin concertos with every significant orchestra in Canada.

Staryk served as the first Canadian adjudicator for the Tchaikovsky Competition in Moscow in 1982.

His discography of over 190 compositions ranks him as one of the most prolific recording violinists on the world stage and the most recorded classical Canadian musician to date. (James Creighton: Discography of the Violin)

In 1987, Staryk appeared as the adult composer/violinist in the two-hour docu-drama film Vivaldi.

== Performances and recordings ==
Staryk performed many violin concertos while the concertmaster of famous orchestras.

In 1957, Staryk played the solo violin sections in Sir Thomas Beecham's recording of Rimsky-Korsakov's Sheherazade with the Royal Philharmonic Orchestra. In 1960, Staryk recorded the solo violin passages, representing the "hero" of the work, in Beecham's recording of Richard Strauss's Ein Heldenleben with the Royal Philharmonic Orchestra.

On 22 - 23 February 1961 in the Concertgebouw, Amsterdam, Staryk recorded Tchaikovsky's Swan Lake with Anatole Fistoulari conducting the Amsterdam Concertgebouw Orchestra, including the violin solo sections. In 1962, Staryk performed the Beethoven Violin Concerto with the Amsterdam Concertgebouw Orchestra conducted by Bernard Haitink.

At Expo 67 in Montreal, Quebec, Staryk performed the Mozart violin sonata in F Major K.337 with pianist Lise Boucher.

Staryk performed the Mozart Violin Concerto No. 3 with the National Arts Centre Orchestra of Ottawa conducted by Mario Bernardi. Staryk recorded the Mozart Violin Concerto No. 5 with the National Arts Centre Orchestra conducted by Mario Bernardi.

Staryk also recorded the Prokofiev Violin Concerto No. 1 with the National Arts Centre Orchestra conducted by Mario Bernardi, and the two Prokofiev Sonatas for Violin and Piano with Bernardi at the piano.

Staryk performed the Robert Schumann Violin Concerto with the Toronto Festival Orchestra conducted by Pierre Hétu, the William Walton Violin Concerto with the National Arts Centre Orchestra conducted by Mario Bernardi, and the Mendelssohn Violin Concerto with the University of Victoria Orchestra conducted by George Corwin.

Staryk had recorded the Bach Violin Concerto in E major with the Hart House Orchestra conducted by Boyd Neel.

Staryk recorded the Bach Violin and Harpsichord Sonata In E Minor BWV 1022 with harpsichordist Kenneth Gilbert. He also recorded the Bach Sonata In G Major For Violin and Continuo, BWV 1021 with harsichordist Kenneth Gilbert.

In 1977, Staryk recorded and performed as violinist with Quartet Canada in the Brahms Piano Quartet No. 2 in A major, together with his colleagues at University of Western Ontario, Ronald Turini (piano), Tsuyoshi Tsutsumi (cello), and Gerald Stanick (viola). He also recorded the Brahms Scherzo (Sonatensatz) for violin and piano.

Staryk performed the Shostakovich Violin Concerto No. 1 with the Toronto Symphony Orchestra conducted by Sir Andrew Davis.

== Personal ==
Staryk met his wife, a violinist with the Amsterdam Concertgebouw Orchestra, during his tenure as the orchestra's concertmaster. Staryk and his wife, Ida Elizabeth Busch, had a daughter, son-in-law and grandson. Staryk and his wife retired to Scottsdale, Arizona following his career, and later to Toronto. His wife died in 2023.

== Honours ==
As a renowned teacher, orchestral and chamber musician, and international soloist, he is considered to be the leading Canadian-born violinist of his generation. He is listed in The Encyclopedia of Music in Canada and 23 international publications including The New Grove Dictionary of Music and Musicians.

The University of Washington conferred on him its Distinguished Teaching Award, the first ever accorded to a professor in its School of Music.

His awards include the Shevchenko Medal, the Queen's Silver Jubilee Medal, an honorary doctorate of letters from Toronto's York University, and arts awards from the Canada Council.

In 2000 he co-authored a book with Thane Lewis about his life as a professional musician in Fiddling With Life: The Unusual Journey of Steven Staryk.

The Gramophone magazine of London stated that "Staryk is among the great ones."

Staryk during his career played on about 40 Stradivarius violins and about 26 Del Jesus violins.

In 2007 he was made an Officer of the Order of Canada and in 2008 received an Honorary Fellowship from the Glenn Gould School of The Royal Conservatory of Music (Toronto).

In March 2009, Staryk started distribution of his recently completed 30-CD anthology of his performances from 1952 to 2003.
