= Brott =

Brott is a surname. Notable people with the surname include:

- Alexander Brott (1915–2005), Canadian conductor
- Armin Brott (born 1958), American author
- Boris Brott (1944–2022), Canadian conductor
- Denis Brott (born 1950), Canadian cellist
- Lotte Brott (1922–1998), Canadian cellist and music administrator
- Ronna Brott, Canadian judge

== Other ==
- Brott Music Festival, annual event in Hamilton, Ontario, Canada
