= Ardyth Webster Brott =

Canadian arts administrator and author

Ardyth Webster Brott CM
- Born: July 31, 1951 St. Catharines, Ontario, Canada
- Occupation: Arts Administrator, author, lawyer
- Education: University of Western Ontario; McMaster University
- Spouse: Boris Brott

Ardyth Webster Brott CM is a Canadian arts administrator, author and lawyer. She is the co-founder and executive director of the Brott Music Festival, National Academy Orchestra of Canada and BrottOpera, based in Hamilton, Ontario.

== Honours ==
In December 2023, Brott was appointed a member of the Order of Canada by Governor General Mary Simon "for her contributions to the Canadian orchestral community, and for her sustained support for youth involvement in music."

She has been inducted into the Hamilton Gallery of Distinction, received the Negev Award, awarded the Hamilton YWCA Woman of Distinction Award, and Orchestras Canada’s Betty Webster Award. She has served on the Board of the National Gallery of Canada, and the Glenn Gould Foundation.

== Writing ==
Brott has published numerous books for children, most notably Jeremy's Decision with illustrator Michael Martchenko, (Oxford University Press 1993) as Olivier ne Sait pas (la courte Echelle 1995.) Jeremy's Decision was orchestrated by Canadian composer Paul McIntyre and performed by numerous orchestras throughout North America.

== Personal life ==
Ardyth Louise Webster was born July 31, 1951, in St. Catharines Ontario to Gordon and Elizabeth Webster.

Brott graduated from McMaster University with a B.A. in English Literature and a law degree from University of Western Ontario.

In 1976, she married conductor Boris Brott. Together, they have three children and four grandchildren. Her husband's sudden death in April 2022 in a hit-and-run, sent shockwaves throughout classical music circles throughout Canada and the world. She has vowed to continue the cultural legacy they built together.
