= Peter Butterfield =

Canadian conductor and classical tenor

Peter Butterfield is a Canadian conductor and classical tenor. In 2003 he founded the VancouverVoices and since 2009 he has been the director of the Victoria Philharmonic Choir. As a singer he has performed throughout Europe, Asia, and North America; working primarily as a concert singer since the early 1980s. He has also appeared on radio and television programs in Canada, Belgium, France, Germany, Italy, Japan, the United States, and the United Kingdom.

== Education ==
Butterfield was raised in Victoria, British Columbia in a musical family (the tenor Benjamin Butterfield and the composer Christopher Butterfield are his brothers), and is a graduate of McGill University where he earned a bachelor's degree in economics and music. He did further voice studies at the Royal Northern College of Music in Manchester, and in Modena, Italy as a pupil of Arrigo Pola, the teacher of Luciano Pavarotti, and with Diane Forlano in London, England.

== Singing career ==
Butterfield made his professional debut as a concert soloist with the Montreal Symphony Orchestra in 1982. Since then he has been performing internationally. After moving to Europe in 1987 he continued to build his singing career in England and then in Italy. As a soloist he has appeared with The Bach Choir, the Bayreuth Festival Chorus with conductor Norbert Balatsch, the Monteverdi Choir under the baton of Sir John Eliot Gardiner, and the Philharmonia Chorus. He has also appeared in operas, including appearances at the Teatro Comunale Florence, the Opéra de Monte-Carlo, a portrayal of the title role in Benjamin Britten's Albert Herring at the Aldeburgh Festival, and in Cosi fan tutte, in London.

In his native country, Butterfield has sung as a soloist with the Toronto Symphony Orchestra, the Symphony Nova Scotia, the Kingston Symphony, the Edmonton Symphony Orchestra, the National Arts Centre Orchestra, the Tafelmusik Baroque Orchestra, the Vancouver Symphony Orchestra, and the Victoria Symphony. He has also worked with the Studio de musique ancienne de Montréal on a number of occasions. In 2007 he notably replaced an ailing Ben Heppner at the last minute as the tenor soloist in Edward Elgar's The Dream of Gerontius with the Vancouver Symphony.

In the United States Butterfield has performed with orchestras and choruses in Atlanta, Boston, Cleveland, Denver, New York City, San Francisco, Seattle, and Washington D.C. In Europe he has performed in concert in numerous places, including the Concertgebouw in Amsterdam, the Palais des Beaux Arts in Brussels, the Barbican Centre in London, the Musikverein in Vienna, and the Grosses Festspielhaus in Salzburg. In Asia he has sung in Japan, South Korea Hong King, notably appearing as the tenor soloist in an internationally broadcast production of Johann Sebastian Bach's Mass in B Minor from Suntory Hall in Tokyo. In addition, he has performed under the batons of such conductors as Steuart Bedford, Jane Glover, Christopher Hogwood, Jeanne Lamon, and Nicholas McGegan.

== Conducting career ==
In addition to maintaining his singing career, Butterfield has worked as a professional conductor since the early 1990s, beginning with various groups in Italy and England. From 1992 to 1997 he served as the associate conductor of I Solisti Madrigale in Florence. After having lived in England for ten years, he moved back to the West Coast of Canada in 2001 where he was music director of the Vancouver Cantata Singers and in 2003, he established the chamber choir VancouverVoices. In 2007 he went on to establish VancouverVoicesYouth choir for singers 10–18 years. In April 2009 he succeeded Simon Capet as the director of the Victoria Philharmonic Choir.

== Recordings ==
Butterfield has recorded three masses by Joseph Haydn with Sir John Eliot Gardiner for Philips Classics Records where he appears as the tenor soloist. One of those recordings was named "recording of the month" by Gramophone in January 2003. His other recordings as a soloist include the Monyeverdi and the Sixth Book of Madrigals on the Nuova Era label, two recordings with the Winchester Cathedral Choir and conductor David Hill for Decca Records, and Sergei Rachmaninoff's All-Night Vigil with David Hill and The Philharmonia Chorus for Nimbus Records.

== Sources ==
- Biography of Peter Butterfield at vancouvervoices.org
- Biography of Peter Butterfield at vpchoir.squarespace.com
- Biography of Peter Butterfield at the Valhalla School of Music
