= Brian Jackson (conductor) =

Canadian conductor and musician

Brian Jackson (born 26 December 1943) is a British-Canadian conductor, organist and pianist. He became a naturalized Canadian citizen in 1974. Until 2012 he was Principal Pops Conductor of the Kitchener-Waterloo Symphony, Orchestra London, and the Victoria Symphony.

== Early life and education ==
Anthony Brian Jackson was born in Penzance, Cornwall, England. He began performing as a concert pianist at age 6 and as an organist at the age of 12. He attended Clifton College in Bristol, and also started conducting choirs and orchestras as a teenager. He worked as a Studio Manager at the BBC from 1965 to 1968. He earned both a Fellowship Diploma from the Royal College of Organists and an Associate Diploma from the Royal College of Music in 1964. In 1965 he graduated from the University of Oxford with a Bachelor of Music and went on to earn a Master of Music in 1968 from that university.

== Career ==
In 1968 Jackson emigrated to Canada and took on the post of conductor of the Peterborough Symphony Orchestra, a post he held through 1972. He also served as the organist-choirmaster at St John's Anglican Church in Peterborough, Ontario from 1968 to 1971 and taught on the music faculty at Trent University. He studied conduction from 1971 to 1973 with Karel Ančerl and Victor Feldbrill in Toronto, Richard Lert in Los Angeles, and Hans Swarowsky in Vienna. He was awarded the Heinz Unger Award in 1972. In 1974, he received a grant from the Canada Council, which allowed him to study conducting further in Detmold, West Germany.

From 1973 to 1974 and 1976 to 1977, Jackson served as director of music at the Erskine and American Church in Montreal. He also taught during that time at Concordia University and McGill University. In 1977 he became the assistant conductor of Orchestra London, a post he held through 1981. He conducted the London Pro Musica choir and was conductor of the International Symphony of Sarnia and Port Huron from 1978 to 1982. He served on the music faculty of the University of Western Ontario from 1977 to 1982 and since 1984 has taught conducting at Queen's University.

In 1982 Jackson was hired as the conductor of the Kingston Symphony, a post he held through 1991. He moved to Kingston, and served as the conductor of the Kingston Choral Society and conductor of the Pro Arte Singers from 1983 to 1987. In 1985 he was conductor of the Ontario Youth Choir.

Jackson worked as a guest conductor with several ensembles, including the National Arts Centre Orchestra, Symphony Nova Scotia, Toronto Operetta Theatre, Toronto Symphony Orchestra, and the Winnipeg Symphony Orchestra. He was the principal Pops Conductor for the Victoria Symphony for seventeen years, retiring in 2012.
