= Ottawa Symphony Orchestra =

The Ottawa Symphony Orchestra (OSO) is a full size orchestra in Ottawa, Canada, including professional, student and amateur musicians. With around 100 musicians, the OSO is Ottawa's largest orchestra, which allows it to perform large symphonic repertoire of the 19th and 20th centuries, including works by Canadian composers.

== History ==
In 1944, Ottawa musicians formed an orchestra with Allard de Ridder as the conductor. The 75-player ensemble was officially called the Ottawa Symphony Orchestra until 1952, but it was commonly known as the Ottawa Philharmonic Orchestra. The Ottawa Philharmonic Orchestra was suspended in 1960 because there was not sufficient funding to pay the musicians' salaries. When the National Arts Centre announced the formation of the National Arts Centre Orchestra (NACO), a resident, full-time professional orchestra based in Ottawa, the board of the Ottawa Philharmonic Orchestra dissolved the ensemble.

In 1965, the largely amateur Ottawa Civic Symphony was formed by former auxiliary Ottawa Philharmonic members, under the baton of Maurice Haycock. The Ottawa Civic Orchestra was renamed the Ottawa Symphony Orchestra in 1976. The annual concert series–four concerts in 1991–was at first performed in Ottawa high schools. In the early 1970s, the OSO began performing in the large concert hall of the National Arts Centre. Previous conductors have included Thomas Mayer (late 1950s), Clifford Hunt (1965–1966), Nicholas Goldschmidt (1966–1967), James Coles (1969–1975), Brian Law (1975–1991), and David Currie (1992–2016). Since early 2016, the Orchestra has been led by Maestro Alain Trudel.

== Description ==
The OSO's Mission Statement is "to enrich the life of the community through, and to foster public appreciation for and interest in, symphonic music." OSO activities such as its concert series, educational outreach activities, and its mentorship program help to support this mission statement.

Almost all of the musicians and audience of the OSO are drawn from Ottawa and the local municipalities. The OSO musicians consist of professional musicians (including performers from the National Arts Centre Orchestra), advanced university-level music students from the University of Ottawa, and highly skilled and experienced local amateur musicians.

Support for the OSO comes from the Government of Ontario through the Ontario Arts Council, The Ontario Trillium Foundation, the City of Ottawa, the Canada Council for the Arts, the University of Ottawa, and from private donors, foundations, major companies, and season sponsors.

The OSO has a different repertoire from the National Arts Centre Orchestra. The OSO is a larger orchestra than the NACO, which allows the OSO to perform works for large orchestra that would not be possible for the NACO. According to The Canadian Encyclopedia, "The Ottawa Symphony Orchestra has co-existed gracefully with the NACO, playing in the same magnificent auditorium (the Opera of the NAC) and planning its program to complement the more complex fare of the full-time orchestra."

The OSO has frequently collaborated with other Ottawa-area music ensembles, such as the now defunct Opera Lyra, the Ottawa Youth Orchestra, the Ottawa Choral Society, the Central Youth Choir and the University of Ottawa Chorale. The University of Ottawa has had a longstanding relationship with the OSO, which includes the mentorship program (which allows advanced University of Ottawa music students to perform in the OSO).

The OSO has premiered music by Canadian composers such as Jan Jarvlepp, Jean Coulthard, Robert Fleming, Andrew Huggett and Colin Mack.

=== Music Director ===
Praised by La Presse for his talent as conductor, musician and performer”, Canadian conductor Alain Trudel was appointed Artistic Advisor and Principal Guest Conductor in early 2016, and is Music Director of l’orchestre symphonique de Laval and principal youth and family Conductor of the National Arts Centre Orchestra. He was also Principal Guest Conductor of the Victoria Symphony Orchestra and guest musical advisor for the Manitoba Chamber Orchestra. Trudel was also the CBC Radio Orchestra conductor.

=== Concertmaster ===
Mary-Elizabeth Brown has led orchestras under the direction of conductors Lorin Maazel, Kryszstof Penderecki, Carlos Miguel Prieto, Helmuth Rilling, Isaac Karabtchevsky, Placido Domingo and others. She served as concertmaster of YOA Orchestra of the Americas from 2006–2008, led the Britten-Pears Orchestra (at the Aldeburgh Festival) from 2007–2009 and was concertmaster of the chamber orchestra Sinfonia Toronto from 2007–2015. She holds concurrent posts as Concertmaster of both McGill Chamber Orchestra and the Ottawa Symphony Orchestra.

=== Principal Musicians ===
==== Strings ====
- Second violin - Sarah Williams: Sarah currently plays in the Ottawa Symphony Orchestra (assistant concertmaster), and the University of Ottawa Orchestra (concertmaster).
- Viola - Rennie Regehr: Professor of Viola at the University of Ottawa School of Music.
- Cello - Thaddeus Morden
- Double Bass - Samuel-San Vachon

==== Wind and Brass ====
- Clarinet - Shauna McDonald: holds a master's degree from DePaul University in Chicago
- Flute - Jeffrey Ray Miller: holds a bachelor's degree in performance at Lewis and Clark College, Oregon.
- Oboe - Susan Morris: Holds a bachelor's degree in performance from the University of Ottawa, is an active freelance musician throughout the Ottawa area, and is director of the Summermusic music camp in Deep River ON.
- Bassoon - Ben Glossop: Holds a master's degree in Music Performance from McGill University in Montreal, is also Principal Bassoon of the Kingston Symphony, works regularly with the National Arts Centre Orchestra, and is an active freelance musician and teacher based in Ottawa.
- Horn - Nigel Bell
- Trumpet - Travis Mandel: a native of Ottawa, who holds a master's degree in Music Performance from the University of Ottawa and teacher of trumpet
- Tenor Trombone - Angus Armstrong, native of Ottawa
- Bass Trombone - Leonard Ferguson native of Kanata, Potsdam, NY
- Tuba - Martin Labrosse: the First Tuba with The Central Band of the Canadian Forces.

- Harp - Caroline Léonardelli: Born in France, she holds a Premier Prix from Paris Conservatoire.
- Percussion - Andrew Harris: Percussionist Andrew Harris is based in Ottawa where he obtained both his Bachelor and Master of Music degrees summa cum laude from the University of Ottawa.
- Timpani - Jonathan Wade: holds a Bachelor of Music from the University of Ottawa. He went on to obtain a Superior Studies diploma in orchestral repertoire from the University of Montreal.

=== Educational programmes ===
The OSO has three educational programmes: a mentorship programme for young musicians, the Symphony for Schools concert series in local elementary schools and the Students at the Symphony programme of complimentary tickets for high school students.
