= Bishop Ryan Xpression =

Canadian vocal ensemble

- Choir
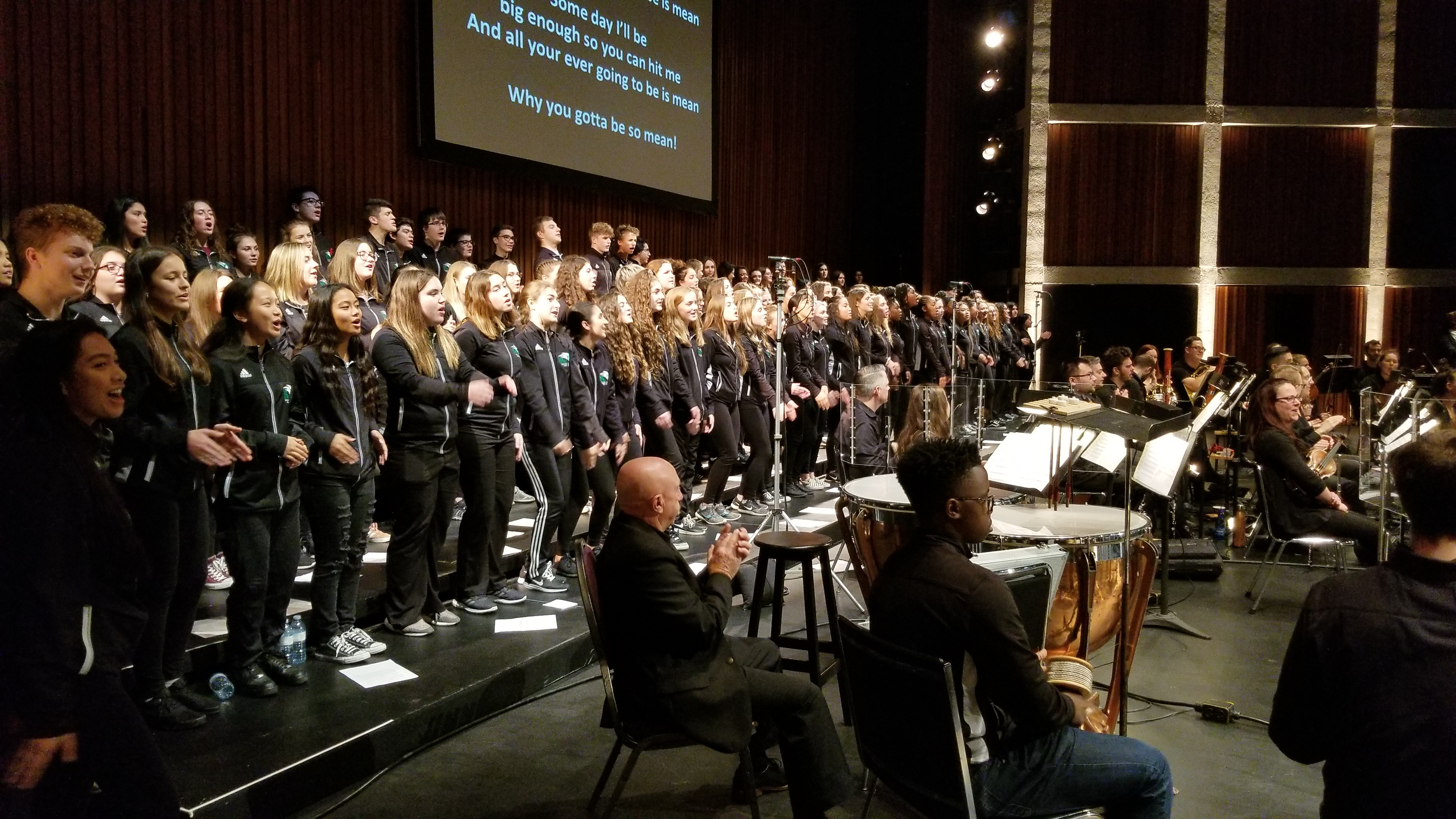
- The Bishop Ryan Xpression performing with the National Academy Orchestra of Canada at FirstOntario Concert Hall in 2018
- Origin: Hamilton, Ontario
- Founded: 1999; 27 years ago
- Music director: Dave Tabone
- Headquarters: Bishop Ryan Catholic Secondary School
- Website: br.hwcdsb.ca/participate/xpressionandfuscion/

The Bishop Ryan Xpression is a 250-voice contemporary youth vocal ensemble based at Bishop Ryan Catholic Secondary School in Hamilton, Ontario. It is directed by Dave Tabone, a music teacher and head of the school's arts department. It was established in 1999.

== Awards and appearances ==
The BR Xpression choir has traveled to New York City, Boston, Chicago, Washington, D.C., Nashville, Montreal and Myrtle Beach to compete in WorldStrides OnStage Heritage Festivals, and has received numerous gold medals, as well as many other awards, such as Maestro Awards, which are awarded to outstanding soloists.

The BR Xpression vocal ensemble has performed with Boris Brott's National Academy Orchestra on numerous occasions, and is regularly involved with and performs at local charity events. The BR Xpression has also performed on stage with Lorde at the 2017 iHeartRadio Much Music Video Awards.

== Bishop Ryan Junior Xpression ==
The BR Junior Xpression is a vocal ensemble directed by Mary Tabone for students attending Bishop Ryan's feeder schools. The ensemble allows students to improve as musicians and vocalists to prepare themselves for participating in the BR Xpression when they attend high school.
