= Victoria Philharmonic Choir =

Choir based in Victoria, Canada

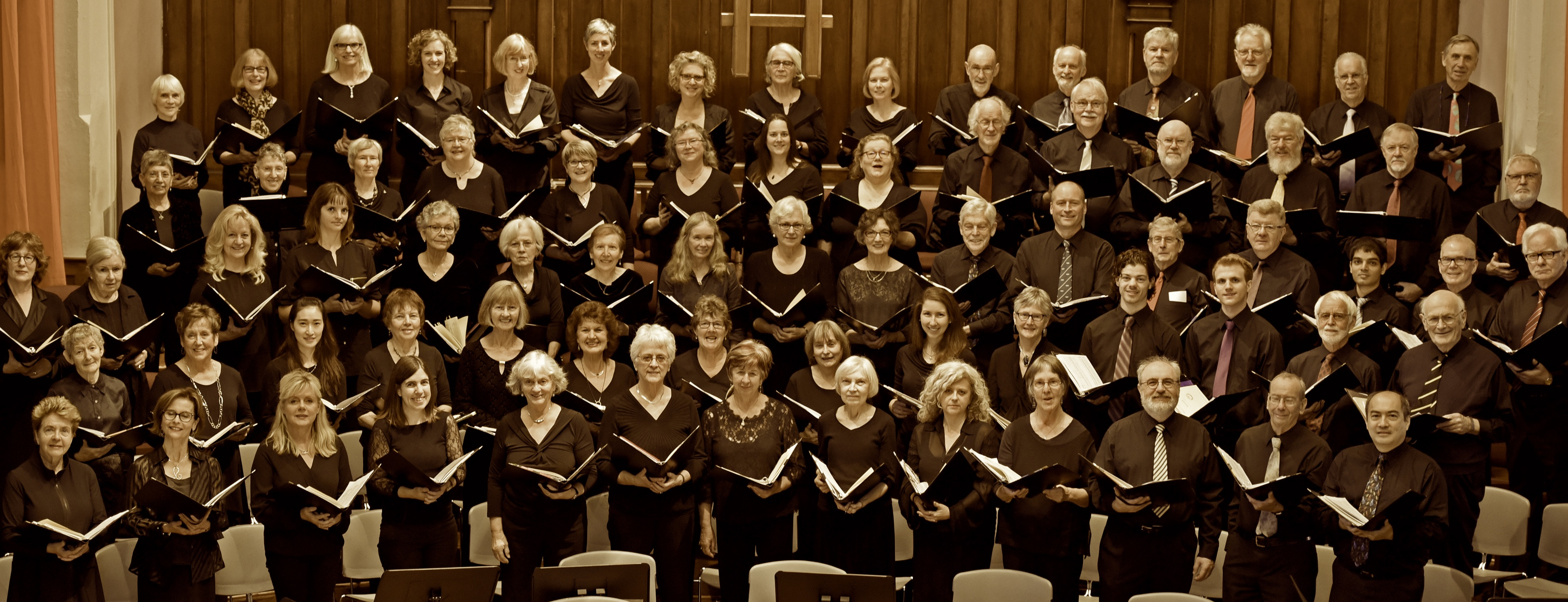
Victoria Philharmonic Choir, 2016

The Victoria Philharmonic Choir is an 80-voice auditioned choir based in Victoria, British Columbia. Conducted since 2009, by artistic director Peter Butterfield, the choir performs a wide range of a cappella and accompanied music, and collaborates with or performs with community and professional vocal soloists and musicians, including the Victoria Symphony.

== History ==
The Victoria Philharmonic Choir (VPC) was created June 2005, as a non-profit performing arts organization. April 2009, music director Peter Butterfield was appointed. Founding artistic director Simon Capet led the choir from June 2005 to January 2009.

== Music ==
Victoria Philharmonic Choir performs, on average, four concert events each season. The concerts include a variety of accompanied and unaccompanied mixed voice choral pieces. The choral repertoire is designed by artistic director Peter Butterfield in collaboration with choir manager, Sherry LePage. The VPC performs a community Christmas Carol Sing-a-Long each year. As well, the VPC hosts an annual "Summer Voices" learning event, a week long choral workshop that culminates in a live performance, usually scheduled in the first or second week of July.

Among the works performed by the Victoria Philharmonic Choir are: Carmina Burana by Carl Orff, Ode on St. Cecillia's Day by George Frederic Handel, Bach's St Matthew Passion, Verdi's Requiem, The Armed Man: A Mass for Peace by Karl Jenkins, Convoy PQ 17 by Christopher Butterfield, Vespro della Beata Vergine by Monteverdi, Haydn's Theresienmesse and Mozart's Requiem.

== Collaborations ==
This choir has been involved in many musical collaborations with noted artists such as: the Band Naden Band of the Royal Canadian Navy, the Victoria Symphony conducted by Tania Miller, the Victoria Civic Orchestra, dance troupe Coleman Lemieux & Compagnie and the Victoria Choral Society.

== Sources ==
- Philharmonic Choir opens season of Peace and Calm (Nov 4, 2017) https://www.peninsulanewsreview.com/entertainment/victoria-philharmonic-choir-opens-season-of-peace-and-calm/ Retrieved 2018-22-23
- Kevin Bazzana: Choral music fit for a Pope (June 5, 2013) https://www.timescolonist.com/entertainment/music/kevin-bazzana-choral-music-fit-for-a-pope-1.313667 Retrieved 2018-22-23
- Christmas Sing-a-longs with Victoria Philharmonic choir (Dec 8, 2011) https://www.vicnews.com/entertainment/christmas-sing-alongs-with-victoria-philharmonic-choir/ Retrieved 2018-22-23
- Victoria Philharmonic Choirs festival a benefit to all of us (Jul 8, 2008) http://www.pressreader.com/canada/times-colonist/20080708/281741265185740 Retrieved 2018-22-23
