= Kingston Symphony Association =

Kingston Symphony Association is a Canadian arts organization in Kingston, Ontario. The organization was formed in 1963 as a managing umbrella organization of several performing art ensembles in Kingston, including the Kingston Symphony and the Kingston Choral Society. The organization currently also manages the Kingston Youth Orchestra, the Kingston Youth Strings, the Kingston Community Strings, and the Kingston Volunteer Committee.

Some of these organizations are not financially self-sustaining, so the association organizes fund-raising events.
