= Graham George =

Canadian musician (1912–1993)

Graham Elias George (11 April 1912 – 9 December 1993) was a Canadian composer, music theorist, organist, choir conductor, and music educator of English birth. An associate of the Canadian Music Centre, his compositional output consists largely of choral works, many written for Anglican liturgical use. He also wrote three ballets, four operas, and some symphonic music. In 1938 he won the Jean Lallemand Prize for his Variations on an Original Theme. At first he employed traditional tertial harmony, but the influence of Hindemith led him to introduce quartal-quintal harmony as integral to his style. Successful completion of RCCO/RCO diplomas and external degrees had demanded he attain very considerable expertise in counterpoint, and so his neoclassic deployment of contrapuntal devices such as imitation, canon and fugue is hardly accidental.

His archives are part of the collection at the Library and Archives Canada.

== Early life and education ==
Born in Norwich, he moved to Canada in 1928 at the age of 16. He studied the organ and music composition with Alfred Whitehead. He earned the Associateship (1934) and Fellowship (1936) of the Royal Canadian College of Organists, the Associateship (1935) of the Royal College of Organists. The examinations for external Bachelor of Music (1936) and Doctor of Music (1939) degrees he earned from the University of Toronto were very similar in scope and difficulty with the theoretical parts of the RCO/RCCO examinations; the degrees additionally required the successful submission of composition exercises. George, like Weinzweig before him, was open to contemporary techniques. From 1952 to 1953, George studied composition with Paul Hindemith at the Yale School of Music. During 1956 he also studied conducting with Willem van Otterloo in the Netherlands.

== Career ==
George worked as a church organist-choirmaster and private music teacher in Montreal (1932–1937) and Sherbrooke, Quebec (1937 to 1941). From 1946 to 1977, he taught at Queen's University. A university research grant and a Canada Council exchange grant facilitated his writing of Tonality and Musical Structure between 1970 and 1973; he subsequently wrote Tonality in Tristan and Parsifal and scholarly articles for musical periodicals.

In 1953, George established the Kingston Choral Society and in 1954 he founded the Kingston Symphony; these he conducted until 1957. From the Canadian Society for Traditional Music's inception in 1956, he was a board member; serving as president from 1965 to 1968. He was active as an organist/choirmaster in Kingston and Gananoque from 1946 to 1975. The Royal Canadian College of Organists elected him its president(1972–1974); from 1969 to 1980 he was secretary-general of the International Folk Music Council.

Upon his retirement, Queen's University named him professor emeritus, and named both its music library (1983) and an annual scholarship (to a meritorious composition student) in his honour. He died in Kingston, Ontario in 1993 at the age of 81, after the onset of Alzheimer's disease. His wife of many years, soprano Tjot George, predeceased him by two years.
