= Bishop Ryan =

Bishop Ryan might refer to one of the following schools:

- Bishop Ryan High School, in Minot, North Dakota, United States
- Bishop Ryan Catholic Secondary School, in Hamilton, Ontario, Canada
