= Bonjour =

Bonjour is a French word meaning (literally translated) "good day", and is commonly used as a greeting. It is the standard, polite way to acknowledge someone during the daytime hours.

Bonjour may also refer to:

== People ==
- Edgar Bonjour (1898–1991), Swiss historian
- Laurence BonJour (born 1943), epistemologist and professor of philosophy at the University of Washington
- Martín Bonjour (born 1985), Argentine professional footballer
- Abel Bonjour, the Parisian cellist that the Bonjour Stradivarius was named after

== Other ==
- Bonjour (software), an Apple computer program which implements Zeroconf, a service discovery protocol
- Bonjour Holdings, a Hong Kong–based retail company
- Bonjour Stradivarius, a cello named after Abel Bonjour
- Bonjour (album), an album by French-Algerian singer Rachid Taha
- Bonne Nuit, a 1999 made for TV horror movie starring Lucie Arnaz
- Bonjour, a character of one half of identical twin duo Bonjour and Au Revoir in Let's Go Luna!
