= Soo Bae =

Korean-Canadian cellist

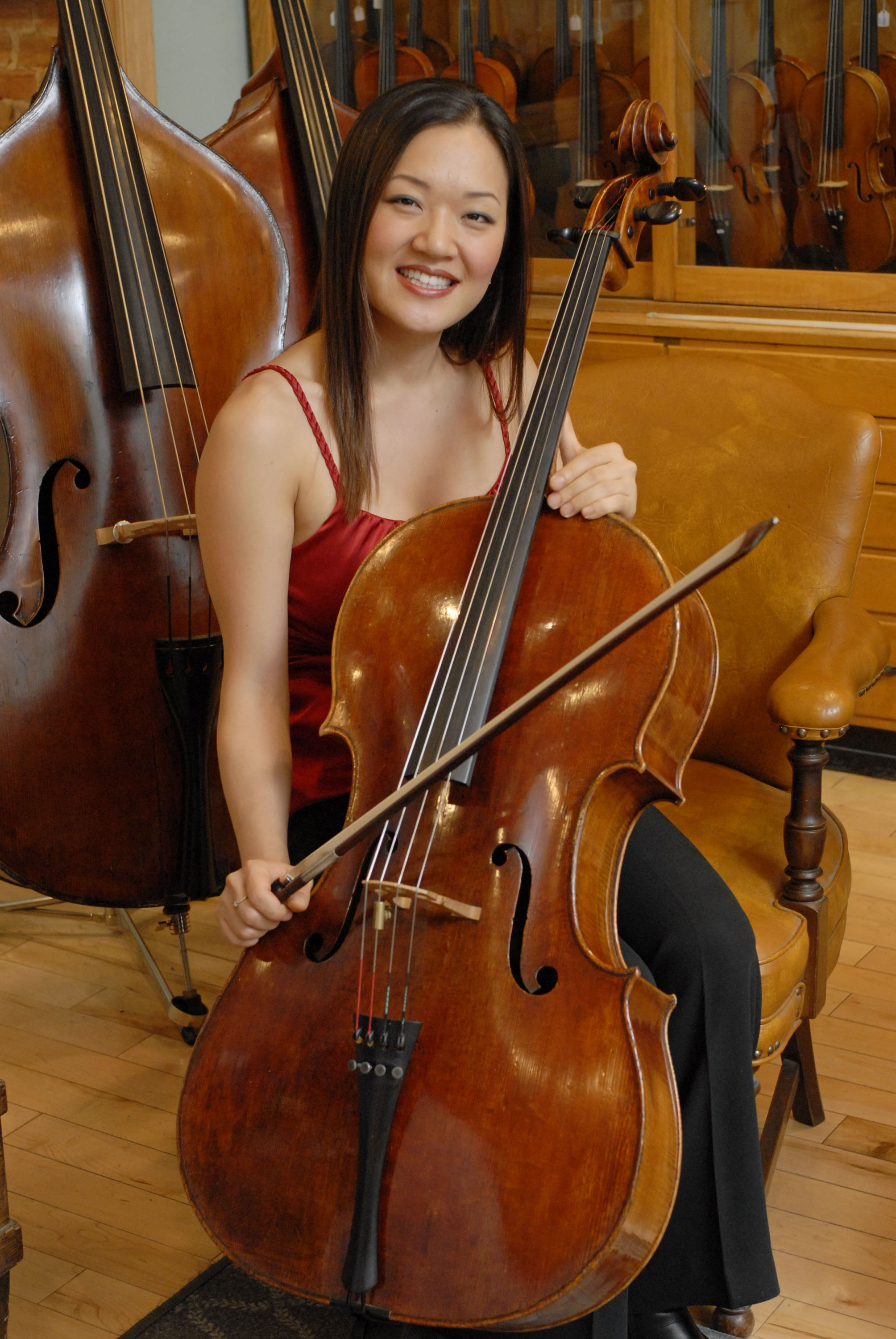
Soo Bae holding a 1696 Bonjour Stradivari cello.

Soo Bae (born 1976 or 1977) is a Korean-Canadian cellist. She is a first-place winner of the 2006 Canada Council Musical Instrument Bank National Competition, which included a three-year loan of the Bonjour Stradivarius Cello.

== Early life and education ==
Soo Bae was born in Seoul, South Korea in 1976 or 1977. She began learning to play cello at age six, and has an older sister who played piano, as well as an older sister who played the violin. Bae and her family moved to Toronto when she was eight.

Her education includes the Royal Conservatory of Music, and then the Curtis Institute of Music in Philadelphia, where she completed her Bachelor of Music in 2001. Bae completed her Masters of Music degree and the Artist Diploma from the Juilliard School.

== Career ==
Bae began her career at age 11 with the Korean Canadian Symphony.

Soo Bae has won several awards and competitions, most notably the 2006 Canada Council Musical Instrument Bank National Competition. Her first place award is the three-year loan of the (c.1696) Bonjour Stradivarius Cello. She was also a winner of the 2005 Concert Artists Guild International Competition, and was awarded in the 2006 Adam International Cello Festival and Competition. In 2014, she was loaned the Ivashkin Joseph Guarneri filius andreae of 1710 cello for five years, which had been permanently loaned to cellist Alexander Ivashkin before his death.

Bae has collaborated with other musicians, including as a duo with jazz clarinetist Paquito D’Rivera, in a trio with fiddle player Mark O'Connor and pianist Soyeon Lee, and in the duo "Walk 132" with her pianist and guitarist husband Jason Suh. She has also performed with the Musicians from Marlboro tour.

Bae has also had works composed for her by the composers Huang Ruo ("Four Fragments") and Jay Gach ("Elements of Style").

== Selected works ==
- Alfredo Piatti - Caprice on a theme from Pacini's Niobe; 12 Caprices for Cello, Naxos (soloist)
