= Alfred Whitehead (composer) =

English painter

Alfred Ernest Whitehead
- Born: July 10, 1887; Peterborough, England
- Died: April 1, 1974 (aged 86); Amherst, Nova Scotia, Canada
- Education: Royal College of Music
- Occupations: composer, organist, choirmaster, music educator, painter, philatelist

Alfred Ernest Whitehead (10 July 1887 – 1 April 1974) was an English-born Canadian composer, organist, choirmaster, music educator, painter, whose works are held in a number of important private collections, and an internationally recognized authority in the field of philately. His The Squared-Circle Cancellations of Canada received its third edition shortly after his death.

Whitehead's music is tonal and sometimes modal; his output of motets and anthems was extensive and he took particular pride in the anthems Alleluia, Sing to Jesus (with organ accompaniment),Ye Choirs of New Jerusalem, Now God Be with Us, and O Light Beyond Our Utmost Light, the short motets Bread of the World, Grant Us Grace, and Almighty God, Whose Glory. Leo Sowerby, a leading American cathedral organist-composer, described Whitehead's Benedicite, based on the Gregorian Tonus peregrinus, as the "best Benedicite" he knew. Whitehead's eight-part motets Watch Thou, Dear Lord (words by St Augustine) and Love Unknown, the Brahmsian organ Prelude on Irby, and his many short carols for Christmas, are also noteworthy.

== Early life and education ==
Whitehead was born in Peterborough, England, where he received his early musical education as an articled pupil of Peterborough Cathedral organists Haydn Keeton and C. C. Francis. He studied in London with organist and theorist Arthur Eaglefield Hull at the Royal College of Music, earning an Associateship in 1910. In 1912, he emigrated to Canada, and in 1913 was the first person to earn the Fellowship of the Canadian Guild of Organists (FCGO), from the organization now known as the Royal Canadian College of Organists. Then, by successful examination and submission of composition exercises, he earned the external Bachelor of Music of the University of Toronto in 1916, and Doctor of Music of McGill University in 1922.

== Career ==
From 1913 to 1915, Whitehead was both organist-choirmaster of St Andrew's Presbyterian Church, Truro, Nova Scotia and instructor of organ and music theory at Mount Allison University. From 1915 to 1923, he was organist-choirmaster of St Peter's Anglican Church, Sherbrooke and privately taught piano, organ and theory; one student there was the composer Allan McIver.

From 1922 through 1947, Whitehead was organist-choirmaster of Christ Church Cathedral. There he "became the acknowledged leader of Montreal's Protestant church music scene." In 1936, Wilfrid Pelletier invited Whitehead's Cathedral Singers to perform with the Montreal Symphony Orchestra for the opening of the very first Montreal Festivals. Thereafter, Whitehead prepared the festival choruses for performances of Johann Sebastian Bach's St Matthew Passion and Ludwig van Beethoven's Symphony No. 9, Bach's Mass in B Minor, Giuseppe Verdi's Requiem, and Beethoven's Missa solemnis.

From 1922 to 1930, Whitehead taught organ, theory, and composition at McGill University's music faculty. He was twice elected president of the RCCO (1930-1931, 1935-1937). Later, the college named him honorary vice-president (1971–1973) and honorary president (1973–1974). From 1947 to 1953, he was head of Mount Allison University's music department. His notable pupils include Alexander Brott, Graham George, Hector Gratton, Frances James, and Ethel Stark.

On retiring from Mount Allison, he was organist-choirmaster (1953 to 1971) of Trinity-St. Stephen's United Church, Amherst, Nova Scotia. He died in Amherst in 1974, at the age of 86.

The Library and Archives Canada holds many of his papers and original manuscripts as well as a large portion of his private library. He is listed as an Associate Composer of the Canadian Music Centre.
