= Alain Trudel =

Canadian trombonist (born 1966)

- Born: June 13, 1966 (age 60); Montreal, Quebec
- Occupations: Conductor, composer, soloist
- Instrument: Trombone
- Website: http://www.alaintrudel.com/

Alain Trudel CQ (born 13 June 1966) is a Canadian conductor, trombonist and composer.

== Biography ==
Born in Montreal, Quebec, Trudel first became known to the public as a trombone soloist. He made his solo debut at the age of 18, with Charles Dutoit and the Montreal Symphony Orchestra. Trudel was the first Canadian to be a Yamaha international artist, and Yamaha has named a trombone mouthpiece in his honour. He served on the faculty of the Conservatoire de Musique du Québec à Montréal from 1995 to 2008, teaching trombone and chamber music.

From 2004 to 2012, Trudel was conductor of the Toronto Symphony Youth Orchestra. From 2006 to 2008, Trudel was music director of the CBC Radio Orchestra, the final conductor to hold the post whilst the orchestra was under the auspices of the CBC. Trudel was also interim music advisor for the Manitoba Chamber Orchestra from 2007 to 2008. He suffered from a rare cancer in his late 30s that caused him to cease work temporarily.

In 2006, Trudel became music director of l'Orchestre Symphonique de Laval. He made his Opéra de Montréal debut in 2009, with Die Zauberflöte, as well as the 30th anniversary gala, which was released as a live CD and nominated for a L'ADISQ award. In 2010, he made his debut at l'Opéra de Quebec. He has served as principal guest conductor of the Ottawa Symphony Orchestra, and principal youth and family conductor of the National Arts Center Orchestra in Ottawa. He was principal guest conductor of the Victoria Symphony from 2009 to 2013. Trudel was music director of Orchestra London Canada from 2011 to 2014, the final music director in the orchestra's history. In September 2012, Trudel became the conductor of the orchestra and chamber orchestra of the University of Western Ontario.

In the US, Trudel first guest-conducted the Toledo Symphony Orchestra in March 2010. In June 2017, the orchestra announced the appointment of Trudel as its next music director, effective with the 2018–2019 season, with an initial contract of 3 years. He held the title of music director designate for the 2017–2018 season.

From 2022-23, he was Interim Artistic Director of the National Academy Orchestra of Canada, Canada's leading professional training program for orchestral musicians, under the umbrella of Brott Music Festival and BrottOpera following the sudden death of founding Artistic Director Boris Brott.

Trudel is the recipient of numerous awards, among them the Virginia Parker Prize, Le grand prix du disque Président de la République de l'Académie Charles Cros (France), and the Heinz Unger Prize for conducting. As a composer, Trudel has been commissioned by the CBC, the National Arts Center, the Toronto Symphony Orchestra, Bellows and Brass, among others. He has also been named an Ambassador of Canadian Music by the Canadian Music Center.

Trudel was made a Knight of the National Order of Quebec in 2019.

== Discography ==
=== Recordings as solo trombonist ===
==== Solo trombone recordings ====
- Récital (SNE-563-CD, 1990)
- Tableaux from France, Vol 1 (Amplitude CLCD-2015, 1992)
- The International Trombone Association presents Alain Trudel Trombone Favorites (ITA WO-121294, 1994)
- Trombone Concerti (Naxos 8.553831, 1997)
- Jericho's Legacy (Naxos Jazz 86021-2)
- The Art of the Trombone: Works for Trombone and Organ (Naxos 8.553716, 1999)
- Conversations (ATMA Classique ACD 22289, 2003)

==== Recordings with solo trombone works ====
- 21st International Trombone Workshop (Hochschule für Musik Detmold HSD 003)
- The Canadian Staff Band: A Gala Festival (The Salvation Army Festival CSBCD-0495)
- University of Calgary Wind Ensemble: Danceries (Arktos 200148)
- François Dompierre: Les Jardins Intérieurs (ANALEKTA AN 2 8302)
- Pascal Dusapin: Concerto[s] (Naïve Records Montaigne MO872181)
- Fiati virtuosi: Frescobaldi, Bassano, Gabrieli: Italian instrumental music from the Renaissance (ANALEKTA FL 2 3013)
- Le Kiosque à musique: Kiosque 1900 (ATMA Classique ACD22293)
- Luciano Berio: Sequenzas I-XIV for Solo Instruments (Naxos 8.557661-63)
- Neil Currie: Passionscape
- Nino Rota: La Strada; Concertos (ATMA Classique ACD22294)
- Trois Concertos: Panneton, Ferguson, Collard (ATMA Classique ACD22282)

=== Recordings as conductor only ===
- Ronald Barron, trombone: An Evening from the 18th Century (Boston Brass Series BB1007, 2005)
- Sanctuary: The heart has its reasons (Warner Classics 2564 62019–2, 2005)
- Bernard Primeau Montréal Jazz Ensemble with Les Violons du Roy: Rencontre Jazz Et Classique – Live Au Gesù (Swing' In Records SITCD5006, 2006)
- National Youth Orchestra of Canada: Selections from the National Tour, 2009 (NYOC2009CD, 2009)
- Opéra de Montréal: Le Gala du 30e anniversaire (ATMA Classique ACD22627, 2010)
- National Youth Orchestra of Canada: Russian Masters – Canadian Creations (NYOC2012CD, 2012)
- Stephen Chatman, composer: Earth Songs (Centrediscs CMCCD14709, 2012)
- National Youth Orchestra of Canada: Mahler: Symphony No. 9 (NYOC2013CD, 2013)
- Jocelyn Morlock, composer: Cobalt (Centrediscs CMCCD14709, 2014)
- Orchestre symphonique de Laval: Ottorino Respighi: Il Tramonto (ATMA Classique ACD22732, 2015)
- Jean-Philippe Sylvestre, piano: Mathieu/Rachmaninov (ATMA Classique ACD22763, 2017)

== Notable premieres ==
- Malcolm Forsyth: These Cloud-capp'd Towers (1989) Concert piece for trombone and orchestra.
- Jacques Hétu: Concerto pour trombone, Op. 57 (1995)
- Alexina Louie: Ricochet (1992) Chamber concerto for trombone and six performers.
- Randolph Peters: The Seven Gates of Kur (2000) For trombone and brass band.

Cultural offices
Preceded by Mario Bernardi	Music Director, CBC Radio Orchestra; 2006–2008	Succeeded by (no successor)
Preceded by Timothy Vernon	Music Director, Orchestra London; 2011–2014	Succeeded by (no successor; orchestra disbanded)
Preceded by Jean-François Rivest	Music Director, Orchestre Symphonique de Laval; 2006–2022	Succeeded by incumbent
