= Peter McCoppin =

Peter McCoppin (born May 2, 1948, in Toronto) is a Canadian conductor and organist.

He studied conducting with Erich Leinsdorf, Lovro von Matičič, and Hans Swarowsky, and taught conducting at the Cleveland Institute of Music (1975-1978).

He was assistant conductor of the Edmonton Symphony Orchestra (1978-1980), and conducted the Canadian Opera Company on tour in 1979. He was music advisor of the Vancouver Symphony Orchestra as it recovered from bankruptcy (1988), music director of the Victoria Symphony (1989-1999), and music director of the Charlotte Symphony Orchestra (1993-2000).

He was principal guest conductor of the Thunder Bay Symphony Orchestra and the Syracuse Symphony Orchestra.

As a music director, McCoppin has consistently improved attendance and restored community support and financial stability, never having taken an orchestra through a "red-ink" season. As a guest conductor, McCoppin has led orchestras in Shanghai, Beijing, Tokyo, Osaka, Seoul, Sydney, Brisbane, Hobart, and Mexico City, as well as all of the major orchestras in Canada. He has produced and conducted a recording of operetta arias with the American soprano, Sherri Seiden and the Slovak National Symphony Orchestra.
