= David Tecchler =

Austrian musician

- Born: 1666; Lechbruck, Bavaria, Holy Roman Empire
- Died: 1748 (aged 81–82); Rome, Papal States
- Other names: David Techler; Tekler; Deckler; Dechler; Decler; Teccler; Teckler
- Occupation: Luthier
- Known for: Construction of cellos, double basses, and other string instruments
- Movement: Italian school of violin making

David Tecchler, sometimes also written Techler, Tekler, Deckler, Dechler, Decler, Teccler or Teckler, (1666, Lechbruck –1748) was a German luthier, best known for his cellos and double basses.

== Early life ==
Tecchler moved from Augsburg to Rome in 1698, while he was still quite young and established himself there.

== Construction ==
Tecchler's instruments are Germanic or Italian in their style of construction.

== List of Tecchler instrument owners ==
Possibly the most famous Tecchler cello known today is the "ex Roser" of Rome 1723, currently being played by soloist Robert Cohen. The scroll of the "ex Roser" is a sculpted portrait of its commissioner, David Tecchler's employer in Rome, who resided in the Vatican.

A 1706 Tecchler cello was acquired by the Canada Council for the Arts Musical Instrument Bank and is on loan to the Canadian cellist Denis Brott.

Other musicians who own or play Tecchler instruments include Anne Martindale Williams, principal cellist of the Pittsburgh Symphony Orchestra, who plays a Tecchler cello made in Rome in 1701, Casals disciples Marie Roemaet Rosanoff, and later Lief Rosanoff, played a 1704 Tecchler cello that is now played by Guy Fishman, principal cellist of the Handel and Haydn Society in Boston, MA. The young Turkish cellist Benyamin Sönmez (+2011), who played a cello made in Rome in 1723; Martha Babcock, Assistant Principal cello at the Boston Symphony Orchestra and Principal cello for the Boston Pops owns a Tecchler known as the "ex-Feuermann", made in Rome in 1741; the Israeli cellist Yehuda Hanani performs on a 1730 Tecchler of particular beauty, tonally and visually, previously in the possession of the Von Mendelssohn family; Stephen Lansberry, a former UK music professor, now living in France, owned, for forty years, an instrument made in 1727; Marcy Rosen, soloist and member of the Mendelssohn String Quartet, plays an exceptionally beautiful Tecchler cello dated 1720. Her cello, owned by the famous Francais family of Luthiers for three generations, was shown in Jacques Francais's Lincoln Center Stainer exhibition in the 1980s.

Steven Doane, Professor of Cello at the Eastman School of Music in Rochester, USA, plays a David Tecchler cello dated 1720. Professor Anthony Elliott at the University of Michigan owns a particularly beautiful Tecchler once owned by the Duke of Edinburgh.

Latvian Soloist Maxim Beitan plays a David Tecchler Cello dated 1698.

Italian cellist Emanuele Silvestri, Principal Cellist at the Rotterdam Philharmonic Orchestra, and teacher at the Amsterdam Conservatory, plays a David Tecchler dated 1729, property of the Rotterdam Philharmonic Orchestra.

Ray Shows, founding member of the Artaria String Quartet (Boston 1986), professor at St. Olaf College and 2004 prizewinner of a McKnight Fellowship plays a violin by David Tecchler from 1726.

Swedish cellist Kristina Winiarski plays a David Tecchler Cello dated 1711 (formerly played by Lynn Harrell and Torleif Thedéen). It is owned by the Royal Swedish Music Academy's instrument foundation.

The Metropolitan Museum of Art is home to an archlute by David Tecchler from around the year 1725.

Toby Saks (1942-2013), Professor of Music at University of Washington and founder of the Seattle Chamber Music Society, owned (with her husband Martin Greene) a 1711 Tecchler cello. This cello was purchased by Klara Belkin (principal cellist, Winnipeg Symphony Orchestra) from W. E. Hill & Sons, London, for $5000 in 1950. Ms. Belkin sold the cello to Saks/Greene in 1987, and they sold it to J. & A. Beare, Ltd, in London in 2012. The cello was reportedly then sold in 2013 by Beare, Ltd. to the Mariinsky Orchestra in St. Petersburg, Russia for approximately $1.8 million. This Tecchler cello was in its original condition, had never been cut down, and at the time of its last sale held the record for the highest price paid for any Tecchler cello. Saks/Greene were told by the principals at Beare, Ltd. that the Saks/Greene cello value exceeded the value of a Tecchler cello they had handled that was previously owned by cellist Beatrice Harrison (1892-1965).

French cellist Edgar Moreau plays a David Tecchler cello dated 1711. The instrument was a gift from his father after Moreau won the "most promising contestant" prize at the 2009 Rostropovich competition.

On 22 October 2019, musician Stephen Morris had been on the London to Orpington service, and got out at Penge East with his bike, but forgot his antique David Tecchler violin, worth £250,000. He was reunited with the violin on 1 November.

== See also ==
- Stradivarius
