= Musical Instrument Bank =

Canadian repository of string instruments

The Musical Instrument Bank is a repository of string instruments maintained by the Canada Council for the Arts. It was established in 1985.

Every three years, the Canada Council conducts the Musical Instrument Bank Competition amongst entrant Canadian classical musicians, the winners of which select an instrument from the bank's inventory that will be loaned to them for a period of three years.

== History ==
An advisory panel to the Canada Council for the Arts proposed the creation of an instrument bank in 1975. In the early 1980s, cellist Denis Brott wrote a letter requesting funding and sent it to "some 50 corporate executives", one of whom asked to meet him. This led to a bequest of $100,000 (equivalent to $224,762 in 2021) from the Barwick family and the creation of the Musical Instrument Bank in 1985.

In 1987, the first instrument acquired for the Musical Instrument Bank was the 1706 Brott-Turner Tecchler cello, obtained using funds raised by W. I. M. Turner and the Brott family, and is on a career loan to Brott. The second acquisition was the 1717 Windsor-Weinstein Stradivari violin, obtained in 1989.

In 2012, a bequest of $1.1 million was used to purchase three instruments. These were the 1730 Newland Joannes Franciscus Celoniatus cello, the 1871 Jean-Baptiste Vuillaume violin, and the 1900 Stefano Scarampella violin.

== Competition ==
In 2000, with the repository of musical instruments having expanded, the Canada Council for the Arts established a "larger scale competition" for Canadian classical musicians, the winners of which could choose from the bank's inventory to obtain an instrument on a three-year loan.

The purpose of the competition is to ensure all instruments from the collection are loaned to musicians.

=== Application ===
The Council receives applications from musicians throughout Canada. The applicant must be at least 18 years old and have had professional training, and must be a Canadian citizen or permanent resident and maintain that status for the duration of the loan period. In addition to a curriculum vitae and other biographical information, the applicant must submit a recording of three solo works accompanied by a description of those works, a description of their instrument, and a copy of their repertoire.

The applications are assessed by a peer committee, who select a group of finalists. The finalists are sent a bailment agreement, which they must review.

=== Interview ===
The finalists travel to Toronto for an interview, where they can also test the available instruments. They then "compete in a live audition process" for a panel of five individuals in the peer committee. Potential conflict of interest is avoided by excluding from the peer committee any owner of a donated instrument and any teacher of an applicant.

The week-long event consists of two days of evaluation of the cellists, followed by four days of evaluation of the violinists. The musicians are ranked by the committee. On the final day, the winning musicians select an instrument to borrow, in order based on their standing in the competition. If a musician forfeits their choice, another musician from a reserve pool of finalists is invited to make a selection.

In 2012, there were 51 applicants, from which 28 finalists were selected and 18 granted the privilege of choosing an instrument from the Musical Instrument Bank.

=== Bailment ===
Once a musician selects an instrument, they are required to sign the bailment agreement they had received during the application process. They will then attend a training session in Toronto on instrument care, as well as the policies regarding use of the instrument. Musicians must also present confirmed engagements and plans covering the first year of their loan. These must include concerts and recitals performed in Canada and internationally.

Once these criteria are met, the musicians will receive their selected instrument. Costs associated with insurance for the instrument, repairs and restoration not resultant from neglect, and luthier fees for the required annual inspection will be borne by the Canada Council for the Arts from its operating fund.

== Instruments ==
The Musical Instrument Bank consists of cellos, violins, and bows that are either owned by the Canada Council for the Arts or loaned to it. Owned instruments are acquired via donation or purchased with funds from monetary donations, and loaned instruments are obtained from patrons in Canada or the United States.

Newly acquired instruments are immediately loaned to one of the reserve applicants from the most recent competition once the instrument has undergone an inspection and any required restoration work is completed.

=== Cellos ===
The status column indicates whether the instrument is owned by the Canada Council for the Arts, or if it is on loan from a donor
Instrument	Luthier	Year manufactured	Year acquired	Status	On loan to	References
1696 Bonjour Stradivarius	Antonio Stradivari	1696	2000	On loan	Bryan Cheng	
1706 Brott-Turner Tecchler cello	David Tecchler	1706	1987	Owned	Denis Brott	
1730 Newland Joannes Franciscus Celoniatus cello	Giovanni Francesco Celoniato	1730	2011	Owned	Daniel Hass	
c. 1750 Gennaro Gagliano cello	Gennaro Gagliano	c. 1750	2023	On loan	Cameron Crozman	
c. 1769 Shaw Adam cello	Attributed to Juan Guillami II	c. 1769	1999	Owned	Leana Rutt	
1824 McConnell Nicolaus Gagliano II cello	Nicolò Gagliano II	1824	2000	Owned	Andrea Stewart	
1929 Carlo Giuseppe Oddone cello	Carlo Giuseppe Oddone	1929	2022	Owned	Christopher Hwang	

=== Violins ===
The status column indicates whether the instrument is owned by the Canada Council for the Arts, or if it is on loan from a donor
Instrument	Luthier	Year manufactured	Year acquired	Status	On loan to	References
1689 Baumgartner Stradivari violin	Antonio Stradivari	1689	1997	On loan	Alice Lee	
1700 Taft Stradivarius violin	Antonio Stradivari	1700	2003	On loan	Daniel Dastoor	
c. 1700 Bell Giovanni Tononi violin	Giovanni Tononi	c. 1700	2002	Owned	Lucy Wang	
1715 Dominicus Montagnana violin	Domenico Montagnana	1715	2006	On loan	Eva Aronian	
1717 Windsor-Weinstein Stradivari violin	Antonio Stradivari	1717	1988	Owned	Emma Meinrenken	
1747 Palmason Januarius Gagliano violin	Gennaro Gagliano	1747	2003	On loan	Julia Mirzoev	
1729 Giuseppe Guarneri del Gesú violin	Giuseppe Guarneri	1729				
1757 Carlo Tononi Bolognese Violin	Carlo Antonio Tononi	1757	2014; 2023	On loan	Yu Kai Sun	
c. 1759 Jeanne Lamon Santo Serafin violin	Sanctus Seraphin	c. 1759	2023	Owned	Naomi Dumas	
1768 Miller Januarius Gagliano violin	Gennaro Gagliano	1768	2012	Owned	Gregory Lewis	
1820 Joannes Franciscus Pressenda violin	Giovanni Francesco Pressenda	1820	2000	On loan	Kumiko Sakamoto	
c. 1830-1850 Eckhardt-Gramatte Joachim Georges Chanot I violin	Georges Chanot I	c. 1830-1850	2017	On loan	Astrid Nakamura	
1851 Jean Baptiste Vuillaume violin	Jean-Baptiste Vuillaume	1851	2018	Owned	Vivian Kukiel	
1869 Jean Baptiste Vuillaume violin	Jean-Baptiste Vuillaume	1869	2009	Owned	Tiffany Yeung	
1871 Jean-Baptiste Vuillaume violin	Jean-Baptiste Vuillaume	1871	2012	Owned	David Baik	
1900 Stefano Scarampella violin	Stefano Scarampella	1900	2012	Owned	Christopher Whitley	
1902 Enrico Rocca violin	Enrico Rocca	1902	2000	On loan	Shannon Lee	

=== Maintenance ===
The instruments are maintained by Ric Heinl and luthiers of Toronto-based George Heinl & Company. Costs for restoration are funded by the instrument donors.

Once an instrument loan expires, the instrument is returned to the company, where any required repairs are made. If major restoration is necessary, the instrument is removed from the loan cycle until the restoration is completed.
