= Lotte Brott =

Lotte Brott CM CQ
- Born: Charlotte Goetzel; February 8, 1922; Mannheim, Weimar Republic
- Died: January 6, 1998 (aged 75); Montreal, Quebec, Canada
- Education: Zurich Conservatory; University of Toronto
- Occupations: Cellist; Music administrator
- Spouse: Alexander Brott (m. 1943; died 1998)
- Children: 2 (Boris and Denis)

Charlotte Brott (née Goetzel; February 8, 1922 – January 6, 1998) was a Canadian cellist and music administrator. She joined the Montreal Symphony Orchestra in 1939, became a cellist with the McGill String Quartet (today the McGill Symphony Orchestra) and performed with the Little Symphony of Montreal. Brott taught cello at McGill University and managed the Kingston Symphony. She retired from the Montreal Symphony Orchestra but was administrator with the McGill Chamber Orchestra until her death in 1998. Brott was appointed Dame of Grace in the Order of Malta, the Member of the Order of Canada and the Chevalier of the Order of Quebec.

== Early life ==
Brott was born on February 8, 1922, in Mannheim, Germany. She was the daughter of an import merchant, and was Jewish. At age eight, Brott began to study the cello, encouraged by her parents. She performed for family friends and guests at home. Brott was sent to Switzerland to avoid Nazi German upheavals and obtained her diploma at the Zurich Conservatory under Emanuel Feuermann in 1939. Later, her family emigrated to Montreal, Canada under Nazi duress and she joined them in July 1939. Brott studied with Jean Belland and later with Zara Nelsova at the University of Toronto. She won a scholarship to the Juilliard School of Music, New York but she declined it and joined the Montreal Symphony Orchestra in 1941.

== Career ==
In 1942, Brott became a cellist with the McGill String Quartet (today the McGill Symphony Orchestra from 1953), succeeding Belland. She also freelanced with the CBC, working with Walter Joachim, John Newmark, and others. From 1946 to 1952, Brott performed with the Little Symphony of Montreal. She taught cello at McGill University, organized concerts and managed public relations and fund-raising, particularly for the McGill Chamber Orchestra and other organizations of which her husband Alexander was artistic director. Brott and her husband co-established the Concerts Under the Stars series at Mount Royal and popular concerts at Maurice Richard Arena. Between 1978 and 1981, she managed the Kingston Symphony. Brott retired from the Montreal Symphony Orchestra in 1987, but she continued as administrator with the McGill Chamber Orchestra until her death in 1998.

Every year, she had responsibility for a concert series featuring the world's leading artists as soloists. Brott was also responsible for multiple concert tours with the McGill Chamber Orchestra as part of cultural exchange programs in Argentina, Belgium, Chile, Colombia, Canada, Czechoslovakia, Hong Kong, Hungary, Japan, Korea, Mexico, Poland, Russia, Switzerland, Taiwan the United States, and Yukon with financial assistance provided by the Department of External Affairs.

== Personal life ==
She married the violinist and music professor Alexander Brott in 1943. Their children, Boris and Denis, became musicians in their own right. Brott became a naturalized Canadian in 1943. She was in a wheelchair for the final years of her life, and she died on the afternoon of January 6, 1998, in Montreal from a complications of a brief illness. Her funeral took place in Montreal on January 9.

== Recognition ==
Brott was created Dame of Grace in the Order of Malta in 1986. She was appointed a Member of the Order of Canada by the Governor General of Canada "for contributions to the Canadian musical scene" on October 25, 1990. Brott was made a Chevalier of the Order of Quebec by the Government of Quebec in 1996 for "her role in establishing corporate sponsorships for the arts." She was honored with a gala concert at the Théâtre Maisonneuve, Place des Arts, Montreal on May 10, 1999. A monument dedicated to Brott was unveiled at Mount Royal Cemetery on October 17, 1999. The McGill Symphony Orchestra established the Lotte Brott Memorial Fund for encouraging young musicians. The Orchestre classique de Montréal organized its 2021–22 season around the theme of Women of Distinction in recognition of the 100th anniversary of her birth.
