= David Currie (conductor) =

Canadian conductor

David Currie is a Canadian conductor who was the music director and conductor for the Ottawa Symphony Orchestra (OSO) from 1992 until 2016. Currie is also an assistant professor at the University of Ottawa, where he teaches double bass and conducting, and conducts the university orchestra.

== Career ==
Currie is a graduate of the University of Michigan and the Interlochen Arts Academy. Prior to joining the OSO, he was a double bass player in the National Arts Centre Orchestra from 1971 until 1991, when he retired as Principal Bass.

Currie studied conducting in Siena, Italy, and at the Toho Gakuen School of Music in Tokyo, one of Japan's most prestigious private music institutions, where he studied with Morihiro Okabe and Kazuyoshi Akiyama. Since 1982, Currie has also been the conductor of the University of Ottawa Orchestra.

He is the founding conductor of the Tabaret Ensemble, a string ensemble of seven professors and seven music students from the University of Ottawa. He is also the founding conductor of the Pierrot Ensemble, a group that performs 20th-century music. Currie has acted as a guest conductor for Ottawa's National Arts Centre Orchestra, and for Ottawa's opera company (Opera Lyra Ottawa).

In May 1992, Currie became music director of the Ottawa Symphony Orchestra. He stepped down in 2016.

== Personal ==
Currie is married to Nancy Currie, an Ottawa-based visual artist and arts teacher, and the couple have two daughters (now adults).
