= BrottOpera =

- Genre: Opera
- Dates: June, July
- Location(s): Hamilton, Ontario, Canada
- Years active: 2015–present
- Founders: Boris Brott
- Website: brottmusic.com

BrottOpera is a Canadian national training program designed for emerging opera singers and serves as a producer and presenter of various opera forms in the southern Ontario region. Operating under the umbrella of the Brott Music Festival, it showcases staged opera performances and opera recitals annually in Hamilton, Ontario, Canada.

BrottOpera was established in 2015 by the late conductor Boris Brott with the aim of filling the void left by the demise of Opera Hamilton. What sets BrottOpera apart is its unique training program for emerging artists, as it's the only summer opera program in Canada that offers young singers the opportunity to perform alongside a full symphony orchestra. This orchestra is the National Academy Orchestra of Canada, the country's sole professional orchestral training program.

Currently, BrottOpera is under the artistic direction of Tania Miller.
