= Max Beitan =

Max Beitan Максим Викторович Бейтан
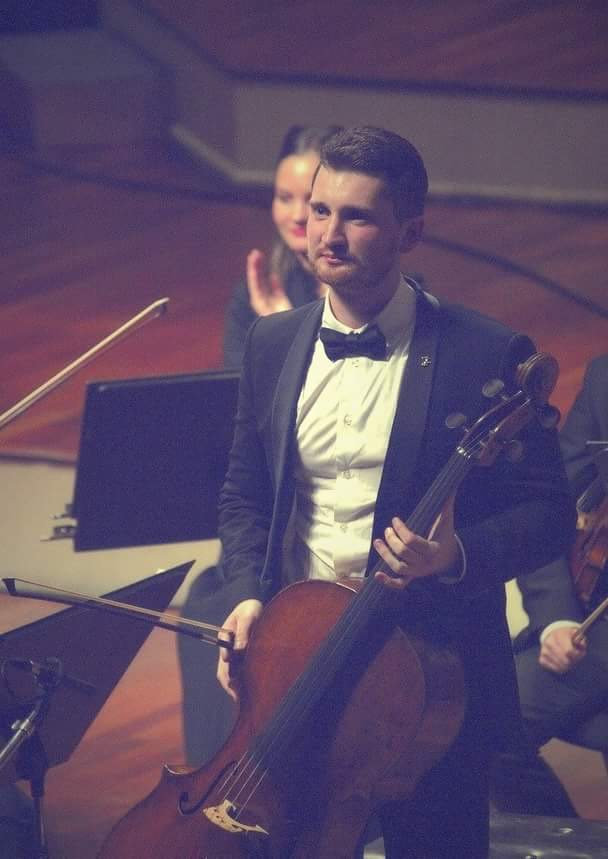
- Beitan at Large Guild, Riga, 2014

Background information
- Born: 25 November 1986 (age 39); Makhachkala, Russia
- Genre: Classical
- Instrument: Cello
- Years active: c. 1993–present
- Website: maxbeitan.com

Maxim Viktorovich Beitan (Russian: Максим Викторович Бейтан; born 25 November 1986), known as Max Beitan, is a Latvian cellist. He is the winner of 18 international competitions, five of them Grand Prix Awards. Max Beitan tours and performs extensively in Europe, the US and Asia and is known for performing a wide repertoire.

== Early life ==
Beitan was born in Makhachkala, Russia, and moved to Latvia in early childhood, where he grew up and began music studies. Beitan studied with Daniil Shafran, Natalia Gutman, Ivo Pogorelich, Johannes Goritzki and Victoria Yagling. He started cello at age four with Irina Titarenko in Jelgava, Latvia. At age five he gave his first solo performance, and at six he appeared on Latvijas Televīzija; during this period he received encouragement from composer Raimonds Pauls. Beitan was awarded with five of the highest Grand Prix Awards, including the Grand Prix of the National Competition "Talent of Latvia", Liezen cello competition Grand Prix (as an additional prize he received 19th century cello from the Soros Foundation as a gift), Teodor Reiter international competition Grand Prix, the Dotzauer Prize in Dresden and the "New Names" in Moscow, which led to him studying with Daniel Shafran. In 2006 he graduated from a Musical College in Latvia and began attending The Royal College of Music in London, where Beitan obtained a Higher Education Degree. He obtained Master's and Soloist Degree at the Conservatorio della Svizzera Italiana SUPSI in Lugano.

== Career ==
In 1997 he was awarded at the Tchaikovsky International competition for youth and performed at the Great Hall of the Rimsky-Korsakov conservatory in St.Petersburg. In 1997 he was personally awarded by the Latvian President Guntis Ulmanis for the international achievements. In 2007 he was invited to perform on the Latvian Independence Day where he met a new president of Latvia Valdis Zatlers. In 2008 Beitan met and had an open lesson with Bernard Greenhouse during Maestro's visit in Royal College of Music. In 2010 he met Ivo Pogorelich which has resulted in many years of collaboration. Max Beitan guests with the orchestras such as The Latvian National Symphony Orchestra, Orchestra della Svizzera Italiana, Sinfonietta Riga, Saint Petersburg State Academic Cappella, The Latvian National Opera Orchestra, The Latvian National Opera Choir, Dresdner Philharmonie, Evian Festival Orchestra, Kaunas City Symphony Orchestra, Lithuanian Chamber Orchestra. Max Beitan has appeared in concert with conductors such as Rafael Frühbeck, Nicholas Milton, Alexander Vilumanis, Normunds Sne, Aigars Merijs-Meri, Andris Vecumnieks, Vladislav Chernushenko, Rimas Geniusas, Laurence Dale. In 2024, Beitan represented Latvia in a commemorative concert on the 75th anniversary of NATO at the Library of Congress in Washington, D.C.

Max Beitan was performing on the pre-opening of the Lugano Arte e Cultura LAC Lugano concert hall. He is a participant of the Lugano Festival, Baltic Musical Seasons, Summertime Festival Jurmala, Evian Festival and others. He performed on the Venetian Film Festival Musical awards with Erika Lemay as well as opening Latvian Musical Awards ceremony together with the violinist Raimonds Ozols.

== Activities ==
Beitan has long been engaged in cultural philanthropy. He collaborates with cultural foundations to connect artists and instruments by encouraging collectors and patrons to acquire significant Italian stringed instruments. Through these efforts, he has supported both young musicians and distinguished artists by arranging loans of instruments crafted by Antonio Stradivari, Guarneri del Gesù, and other eminent historical Italian luthiers.

In 2014, in partnership with Fondo Ambiente Italiano, Beitan organized an exhibition at Villa del Balbianello on Lake Como, which FAI described as “a unique encounter between history, art, and music.” In 2016, he presented a quartet of Stradivari instruments at Villa Mozart in Milan. In 2017, collaborating with Baltic Musical Seasons, he brought a collection of Italian stringed instruments to the Art Museum Riga Bourse in Latvia.

He is the founder of the Beitan Music Foundation, an organization devoted to promoting classical music, supporting artists, and fostering investment in fine instruments. He was also involved in the founding of the Sports Programs Department at the Conservatorio della Svizzera Italiana in Lugano, helping to shape the institution’s educational and cultural offerings.

== Recognition and awards ==
- Grand Prix, National Competition "Talent-Latvia", Riga, Latvia, 1992
- Grand Prix, International Cello competition, Liezen, Austria, 1996
- Award, International P.Tchaikovsky Competition in St.Petersburg, Russia, 1997
- Grand Prix, National Competition "Talent-Latvia", Riga, Latvia, 1998
- 1st prize, International Competition "Valsesia Musica" in Italy, 2002
- Grand Prix, T. Reiter International Competition in Riga, Latvia, 2002
- 1st Prize, International Competition "Olimpo Muzikale" in Kaunas (Lithuania), 2005
- 1st prize MBF Education Awards London, UK 2007
- 1st prize, Anna Shuttleworth Prize, London, UK 2008
- Award, Credit Suisse Prix, Luzern, Switzerland 2012
- 2nd International Dotzauer Competition in Dresden, Germany, 2001 and 2005
- 2nd prize International E.Bloch Competition, London, UK 2009
- ESKAS Swiss Government Scholarship, May 2010, 2011

== Instruments ==
Instruments he has played includes:

- Antonio Stradivari cello “Archinto” from 1689
- Antonio Stradivari cello “Magg” from 1698
- David Tecchler cello from 1698
