= Ottawa Youth Orchestra Academy =

Canadian charitable organization

- Abbreviation: OYOA
- Formation: 1960
- Type: Music Organization based in Canada
- Legal status: Active
- Purpose: Advocate and public voice, educator and network
- Headquarters: Ottawa, Ontario, Canada
- Region served: Canada
- Official language: English, French
- Website: Ottawa Youth Orchestra Academy

The Ottawa Youth Orchestra Academy (OYOA) is a registered Canadian charitable organization that comprises two full orchestras, eight instrumental ensembles for strings, winds, brass and harp. The organization also includes a beginner's and pre-school program as well as instruction in music theory and history through Grade 3 in the RCM Syllabus.

The OYOA has ongoing partnerships with the National Capital Commission for the Winterlude concert and the Ottawa Symphony Orchestra.

== History ==
The Ottawa Youth Orchestra was founded in 1960 for young musicians of the Ottawa area to gain experience in ensemble and orchestral music. Playing through weekly rehearsals and performances before live audiences, the orchestra usually presents four public concerts each season. The Orchestra operated as a night school class under the Continuing Education Division of the Ottawa Board of Education, and a nominal fee was charged, though the membership was limited to those from 12 to 24 years of age. In 1971, an Associate Youth Orchestra was founded with rehearsals being held at Canterbury High School.

In 1982, John Gomez and colleagues from the National Arts Centre Orchestra, founded the National Capital String Academy. The National Capital Wind Academy was formed in 1985 to provide similar opportunities to wind and brass players. The two groups merged in 1986 as the National Capital Strings and Wind Academy, and re-established the Ottawa Youth Orchestra which had been dormant for six years.

The organization was incorporated as the National Capital Music Academy in 1988. As it entered its twenty-first year of operation under founding Music Director John Gomez, the National Capital Music Academy changed its corporate name to the Ottawa Youth Orchestra Academy (OYOA).

== Description ==
The original purpose in founding the academy was to train young string players in ensemble playing. The academy has expanded into woodwind, brass and percussion instruments, and a summer camp program. The enrollment in the Academy is now about 350, aged between 3 and 18 years.

The academy provides instruction on the playing of strings, percussion, woodwinds, and brass instruments in an ensemble. Many of the conductors and coaches are regular performers at the Ottawa National Arts Centre.

The students of the OYOA regularly perform in the Kiwanis Music Festival as ensembles or solo performers. In the past years, some students have won their class in the local festival and represented the Canada National Capital Region provincially.

A concert season featuring the OYO and OJYO is held and the OYOA hosts two free concerts each year at the students perform in ensembles.
