= Simon Capet =

English conductor and filmmaker

Simon Capet is an English conductor and filmmaker. He founded the Victoria Philharmonic Choir in 2005 and the Euphonia Music Festival in 2006. A graduate of the Vancouver Film School, his work on the 2000 musical drama film Evirati won the Telefilm Canada Award for Best Emerging Director of a Short Film at the Vancouver International Film Festival, and the award for Best Short Screenplay at the New York International Independent Film and Video Festival.

Born into a family of professional musicians, Capet grew up in London. At the age of 15 he entered the Royal College of Music and later attended the Royal Academy of Music (RAM) on an exhibition scholarship. After graduating from the RAM in 1990, Capet served as music director of multiple ensembles over the next several years, including the Pegasus Ensemble, Battersea Arts Centre Opera, The Middlesex Philharmonic, and the Harrow Symphony Orchestra. In 1995 he was appointed the music coordinator and assistant conductor for the Vancouver Opera. He later became the music director of the Modern Baroque Opera in Vancouver for three years, winning a Brian McMaster Award for Outstanding Achievement in Opera and a Rio Tinto Alcan Performing Arts Award for his work with the company.

In 2005 Capet founded the Victoria Philharmonic Choir (VPC), serving as its principal conductor until 2008 when Peter Butterfield succeeded him. With the choir he notably organized a re-imagined version of Antonín Dvořák's The Spectre's Bride which used a new modernized English libretto by Mollie Kaye, shadow puppets by Emmy Award winning puppeteer Tim Gosley, and set designs by Pixar's Michel Gagné.

Capet has worked as a freelance conductor for over 20 years, guest conducting orchestras in North America and Europe. In 2009 he made his Carnegie Hall debut conducting concerts with The New York Pops.

In 2012 Capet created Classical Social, a weekly jam session for classical musicians at Fionn MacCool's, a local pub in downtown Toronto.

Capet is a cofounder of the orchestral ensemble euphonia, a group of dynamic musicians who share the objective of creating new audiences for live performances of classical music. In April 2013 euphonia became the new house band at the Toronto nightclub Lula Lounge.
