= Bishop Ryan Catholic Secondary School =

Canadian Catholic secondary school

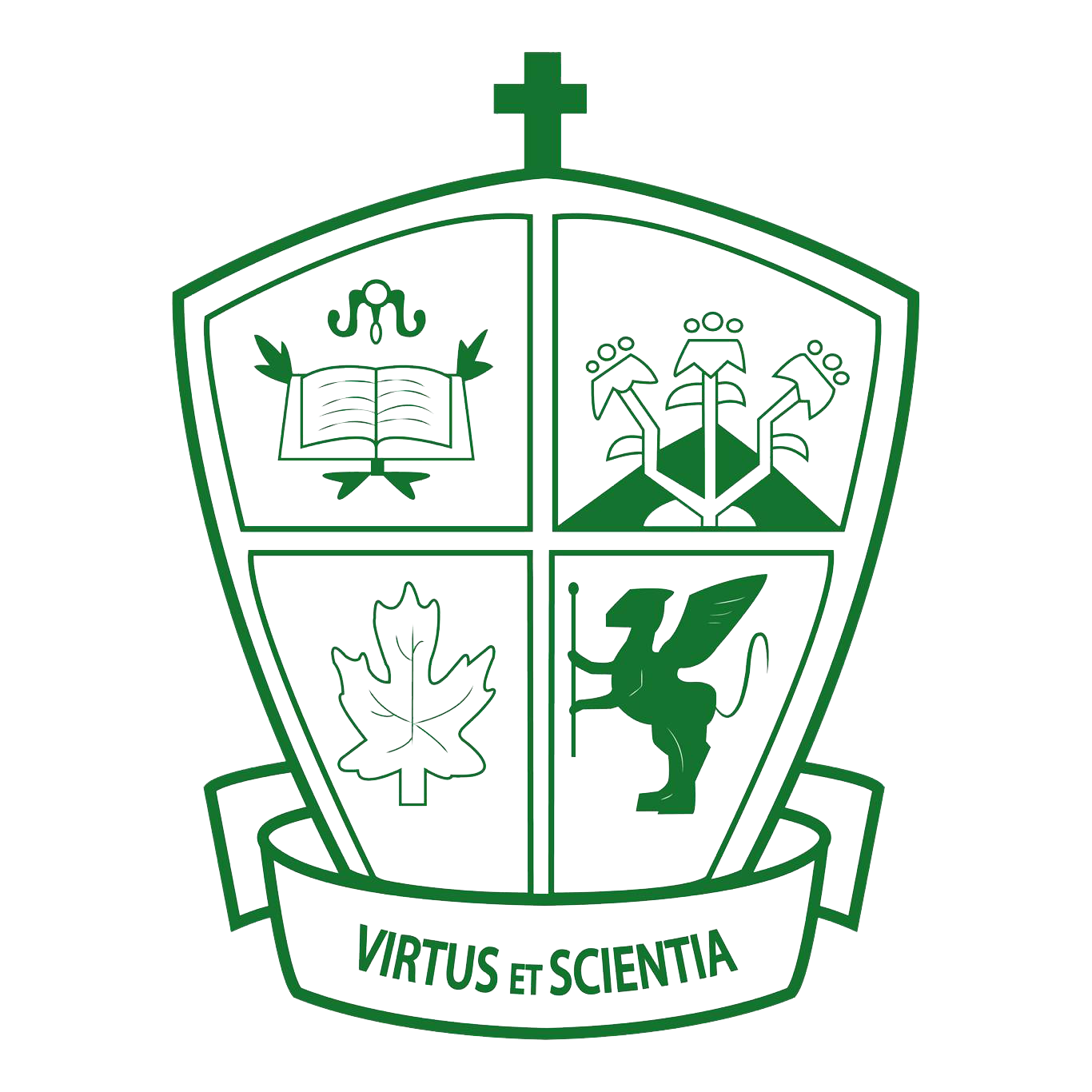
- Coat of Arms

Location
- 1824 Rymal Road East; Hamilton, Ontario, L0R 1P0; Canada; 43°10′54″N 79°48′58″W

Information
- School type: Public, separate secondary school
- Motto: Latin: Virtus et Scientia (Virtue and Knowledge)
- Religious affiliation: Catholic
- Established: April 16, 1959
- Founder: Bishop Joseph Francis Ryan
- School board: Hamilton-Wentworth Catholic District School Board
- Superintendent: Morris Hucal
- Area trustee: Louis Agro
- School number: 689750
- Principal: Christina Groppo
- Chaplain: Kathleen Thompson
- Grades: 9–12
- Enrollment: 2,115 (2025)
- Campus size: 180.3 acres (73.0 ha)
- Campus type: Suburban
- Colours: Green and white
- Slogan: Where faith, pride and effort promote excellence
- Mascot: Verity
- Team name: Celtics
- Yearbook: The Griffin
- Affiliation: Bishop Ryan Xpression
- Website: Official website

Bishop Ryan Catholic Secondary School is a Catholic secondary school located in Hamilton, Ontario. It was founded in 1958 and is under the authority of the Hamilton-Wentworth Catholic District School Board.

== History ==
Although construction began the year before, Bishop Ryan Catholic Secondary School was officially opened on April 16, 1959, by Joseph Francis Ryan, then Bishop of Hamilton. At that time, the school was located on Queenston Road.

On February 4, 1991, the students and staff started the second semester in the new location, a former public elementary school, on Albright Road. The old building on Queenston Road was demolished; a housing community called Ryan's Walk now occupies the land.

A third Bishop Ryan Catholic Secondary School building opened in January 2014 after delays in construction during late 2013. The 73-hectare site is at 1824 Rymal Road East and Dakota Boulevard in the community of Hannon in Hamilton, Ontario. The school was designed by Svedas Architects Inc. and was built by Tambro Construction. In September 2015, the Hamilton-Wentworth Catholic District School Board transferred the site of the former school building on Albright Road to Ridgecrest Estates Inc. The building has since been demolished and condominiums have been constructed on the site.

In 2017, just four years after the new building opened, the total headcount at Bishop Ryan was 1,753 students. The yearly student growth had increased by 15 percent over the past two years, meaning there was around an additional 263 new students entering. As of 2024–2025, the Ministry of Education lists Bishop Ryan's enrollment as 2,115 (preliminary).

During 2021, Bishop Ryan faced allegations of on-campus sexual abuse. 53-year-old teacher Brian Boyle from Hamilton was convicted and tried for four counts of sexual assault, three counts of sexual exploitation, and one count of sexual interference.

The school is currently headed by principal Christina Groppo.

== Co-curricular groups and teams ==
Bishop Ryan is home to a number of sports teams and co-curricular groups. Notable examples include the Bishop Ryan Xpression vocal ensemble, Bishop Ryan wrestling team, and the robotics team Celt-X 5406. The school has been noted for its musical talent due to its vocal ensemble group.

== Feeder schools ==
Bishop Ryan has the following official feeder schools:

- Our Lady of the Assumption
- Our Lady of Hope
- St. James the Apostle
- St. John the Baptist
- St. Luke
- St. Mark
- St. Matthew
- St. Paul

== Notable alumni ==
- Brandon Bizior, singer-songwriter and finalist on The Next Star
- David Brown, professional ice hockey goaltender
- Anne Carson, writer, Nobel laureate (2026 Nobel Prize in Literature)
- Ben Chiarot, professional ice hockey defenceman
- Sheila Copps, former member of Parliament and Deputy Prime Minister of Canada
- Sean O'Sullivan, former member of Parliament and director of vocations at the Catholic Archdiocese of Toronto
- Filomena Tassi, Canadian Minister
- Tony Valeri, former Canadian federal minister
- Rachael Vanderwal, professional basketball player
- Chris Woodcroft, Olympic wrestler
- Greg Woodcroft, Olympic wrestler
- Arber Xhekaj, professional ice hockey defenceman

== See also ==
- Education in Ontario
- List of secondary schools in Ontario
