= Trinity-St. Stephen's United Church =

Church in Amherst, Nova Scotia

Coordinates: 45°50′3.4″N 64°12′38.7″W

Trinity-St. Stephen's United Church is the largest United Church in Amherst, Nova Scotia, and is located at 1 Ratchford Street. The church was formed by the union of Trinity Methodist Church and St. Stephen's Presbyterian Church. The first joined service of the two churches, held in today's church building, was on July 6, 1936. The Fort Lawrence congregation joined with Trinity-St. Stephen's in 1957.

There are currently 400 members of the church.

The current minister of the church is Rev. Nigel Weaver. Jeff Joudrey is the current Organist and Music/Choir director.
