= Denis Brott =

Canadian cellist, music teacher and conductor

Denis Brott CM, SMOM is a Canadian cellist, music teacher, conductor, and founder and artistic director of the Montreal Chamber Music Festival.

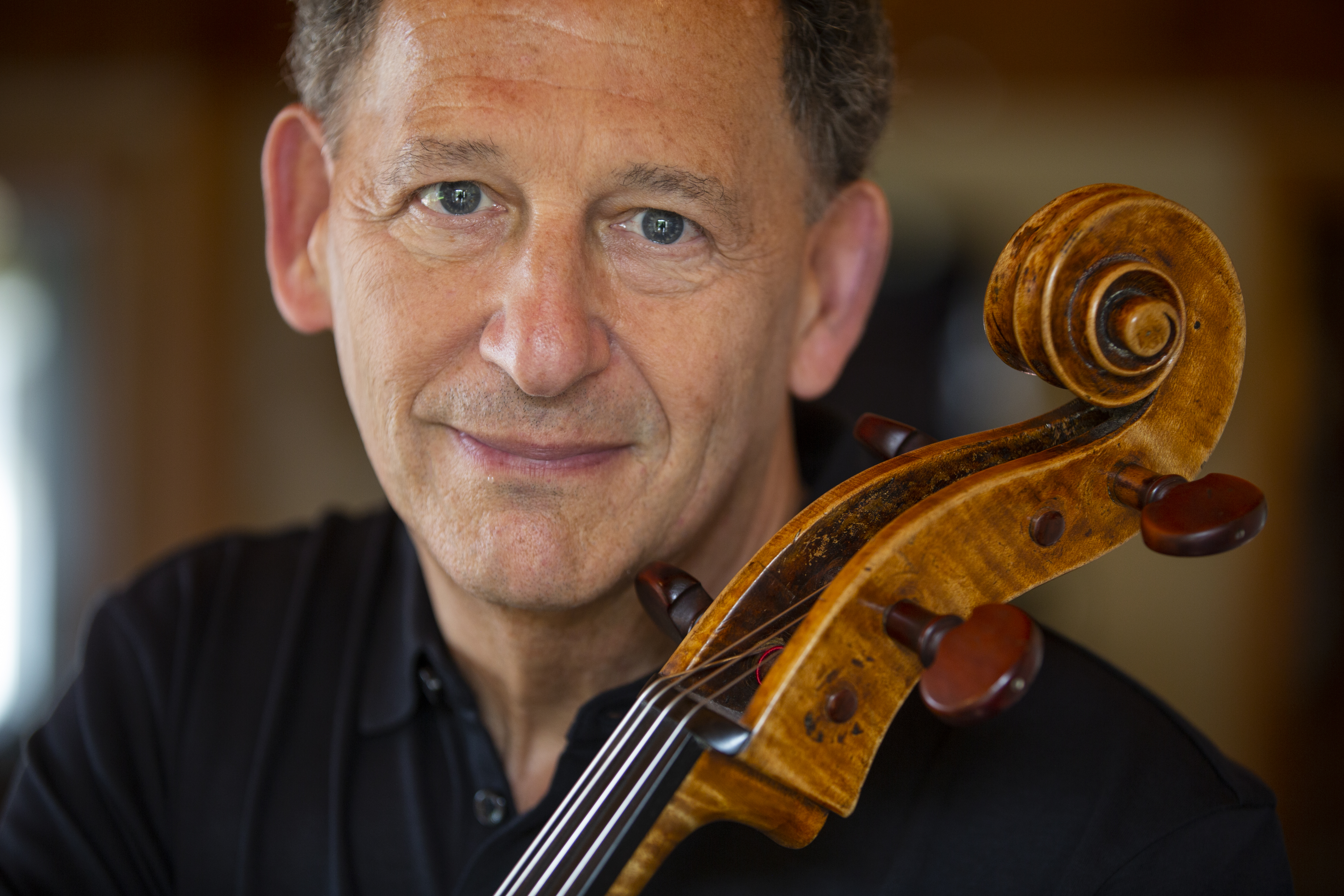

== Early life and education ==
Brott was born in Montreal, into a family of professional musicians; he is the son of the violinist and composer Alexander Brott and cellist Lotte Brott (née Goetzel), and the younger brother of late conductor Boris Brott. His mother was born in Mannheim, Germany, a country she had left in 1939 because of political oppression.

He studied cello with Walter Joachim at the Conservatoire de Musique de Montréal from 1959 to 1967, with Leonard Rose at The Juilliard School in New York from 1964 to 1968, with Janos Starker at the Indiana University in Bloomington from 1968 to 1971 and with Gregor Piatigorsky at the University of Southern California in Los Angeles, until 1975, acting as Piatigorsky's assistant for part of his four years there.

== Career ==
As a young man Brott performed as a cellist and conductor, winning numerous awards including:

- Affiliated Artist Awards, New York City (1978)
- 2nd prize, 22nd International Cello Competition, Munich, Germany (1973)
- 1st prize, Amarillo Symphony Competition, Amarillo, Texas (1971)
- Enlow Young Artist Award, Evansville, Indiana (1971)
- 1st prize, Indiana University Philharmonic Competition, Bloomington, Indiana (1971)
- 1st prize, Montreal Symphony Competition (1971)
- 1st prize, Young Musicians Fondation Competition Debut Award, Los Angeles (1971)
- 1st prize, National Young Artist Competition, Odessa, Texas (1969)
- 1st prize, Washington National Symphony Orchestra Merriweather Post Competition (1967)
- Canadian Centennial Prize (1967)
- 2nd prize, Jeunesse Musicales Competition (1967)
- 1st prize, Quebec Music Festivals

In 1975 he became a professor of Cello and Chamber Music at the North Carolina School of the Arts. In 1978, he became a professor of Cello and Chamber Music at the Interlochen Arts Academy in Michigan. In 1980, he joined the Orford String Quartet at the University of Toronto, quartet in residence at the U of T Faculty of Music, teaching and performing there until 1989.

In 1985, Brott played a pivotal role in the creation of the Canada Council for the Arts Musical Instrument Bank, which collects fine string instruments to lend to Canadian musicians. In recognition of his contribution, the Instrument Bank loaned him a 1706 David Tecchler cello for his lifetime use, and named the instrument in his honor as well as that of William Turner, "Brott-Turner Tecchler".

Since 1989 he has been Professor of Cello and Chamber Music at the Conservatoire de musique du Québec à Montréal. In 2017, he was appointed conductor of the Conservatoire's Grand Orchestre à Cordes.

In 2017, he began giving guest master classes for the Netherlands String Quartet Academy.

His concert tours have taken him to four continents and he has performed at many festivals, including Marlboro, Sitka, Santa Barbara, Banff, and Toronto Summer Music.

Brott has also taught at numerous summer music festivals, most notably at the Music Academy of the West in Montecito, California from 1992 until 2001, where he held the Jeanne Thayer Cello Chair; the Orford Arts Centre; Domaine Forget; and Musicorda Chamber Music Institute and Festival. He is a regularly invited teacher and performer at the Banff Summer Music Festival as well as frequent juror and lecturer at the Banff International String Quartet Competition.

He was guest artistic director of the Festival of the Sound in Ontario in 1991.

He has served as an international juror at distinguished competitions including the Evian International String Quartet Competition (1993), the Munich International ARD String Quartet Competition (1996 & 2008), the CBC Radio National Competition for Young Performers (1997), the Munich International ARD Cello Competition (1998) and at the Banff International String Quartet Competition twice.

Brott performed for nine years with the Orford String Quartet, during which time he recorded 25 chamber music CDs. During his tenure the quartet was named Ensemble of the Year by the Canadian Music Council (1986) and their recordings of the complete string quartets of Beethoven won the Grand Prix du Disque Award (1998) and two Juno Awards (1985, 1987) for Best Chamber Ensemble Classical Recording.

Brott appeared as invited guest cellist with some of the world's finest string quartets including the Emerson, Guarneri, Tokyo, St. Lawrence, Fine Arts, Dover, Ulysses, and Barbican String Quartets.

Brott has made many recordings as a solo artist, the best known being the Brahms Sonatas for cello and piano with Glen Montgomery, piano, and Homage to Piatigorsky with Samuel Sanders, piano, Evan Drachman, cello and Tony Randall, narrator.

== Awards ==
- Order of Montreal (2016)
- Order of Canada (2015)
- Queen Elizabeth II Diamond Jubilee Award (2012)
- Great Montrealer award for Culture (2004)
  - The Board of Trade of Metropolitan Montreal selected Brott as one of four new Great Montrealers in 2004 who have marked the history of Montreal and have distinguished themselves in one of the following sectors: economic, cultural, social, or scientific.
- Knight of Merit of the Sovereign Military Order of Saint John of Jerusalem (1992)
  - Award for distinguished service to music in Canada
- Grand Prix du Disque Canada (1988)
  - Best Solo or Chamber Music Recording: Schubert Quintet, Orford Quartet and Ofra Harnoy,
- Juno Award (1987)
  - Best Classical Album in the Solo or Chamber Music Category, Schubert Quintet, Orford Quartet and Ofra Harnoy
- Ensemble of the Year Award, Canadian Music Council, Orford String Quartet (1986)
- Juno Award (1985)
  - Best Classical Album in the Solo or Chamber Music Category; Recording of Mozart Quartets K. 387, K. 421, K. 465, and K. 458 with Orford Quartet
- Affiliate Artist Award, New York City (1978)

== Montreal Chamber Music Festival ==
Brott is the founder and artistic director of the Montreal Chamber Music Festival.

In 1990, Brott moved back to Montreal, with plans to make classical music more accessible to the public by developing an international chamber music festival. His idea gained the approval of then mayor of Montreal, Pierre Bourque. It was decided to hold the Festival at The Chalet de la Montagne situated atop Mont Royal.

In 1995, the first Montreal Chamber Music Festival was held at The Chalet de la Montagne, with Brott as its founder and artistic director. The festival organizers sought out historic locations for the performances and planned concerts by internationally known chamber musicians and chamber ensembles. The aim was to allow promising young chamber musicians to perform with established musicians thereby acquire experience essential to the development of their careers, promote exchanges between Canadian and foreign chamber music artists and enhance the stature of Montreal as a cultural hub for chamber music activity.

In 2006, the Festival participated in the rejuvenation of downtown Montreal known as the "Quartier des festivals". The festival moved to the historic St. James United Church.

The Montreal Chamber Music Festival performs annually in the salle Bourgie at the Montreal Museum of Fine Arts.

In 2020, due to COVID-19 restrictions prohibiting in-person, live performance, the Festival became a Festival Reimagined. Over an 18-month period it produced over 21 videos when live concerts were prohibited.

Since the fall of 2021, the Festival is back to presenting live concerts.

== Personal life ==
In mid-March 2020, Brott contracted one of the first gravely serious cases of COVID-19 in Canada and was placed in an induced coma intubated in intensive care in Montreal's CHUM Hospital for over 32 days. He has made a complete recovery.

== Discography ==
=== Solo ===
- 3 Sonatas for Cello & Piano: Analekta AN2 9901 (Glen Montgomery, piano). Johannes Brahms Sonata in E Minor, Opus 38, Sonata in D Major, Opus 78, Sonata in F Major, Opus 99
- Remembering Piatigorsky: Analekta FL2 3035 (Samuel Sanders, piano; Tony Randall, narrator; Evan Drachman, 2nd cello). Beglarian "Of Fables, Foibles & Fancies", Haydn Divertimento, Menotti Suite for 2 Cellos & Piano, Piatigorsky Syrinx for Solo Cello, Piatigorsky Promenade for Solo Cello, Piatigorsky Variations on the 24th Caprice of Paganini
- Celebration: Analekta AN2 7201–2. National Arts Centre Orchestra 25th Anniversary, (National Arts Centre Orchestra, Mario Bernardi, conductor). Tchaikovsky Variations on a Rococo Theme, Op. 33
- Brott Arabesque for Cello & Orchestra: Analekta ANC 9801. (McGill Chamber Orchestra, Boris Brott, conductor)
- Tribute to Piatigorsky: DFCDI-013. (same repertoire as FL2 3035)
- Anthology of Canadian Music: CBC ACM20. Alexander Brott, Brott Psalmody for Solo Cello, Brott Shofar for Solo Cello
- Debussy Sonate: CBC SM185 . Schubert Introduction, Theme & Variations, Opus 82 #2 (Charles Reiner, piano), Strauss Sonata in F Major, Opus 6 (Rebecca Penneys, piano)

=== Chamber music with Orford String Quartet ===
- The Complete String Quartets of Beethoven: Delos DE 3039. Volumes I-VIII.
- Brahms Piano Quintet in F Minor, Opus 34: Sefel SEFD 5019. (Gloria Saarinen, piano)
- Brott "Critic's Corner": SNE 516. (Louis Charbonneau, percussion), Brott Songs of Contemplation (Maureen Forrester, mezzo-soprano)
- Brott Ritual: CBC SMCD 504. (CBC Vancouver Orchestra, Simon Streatfeild, conductor), Elgar Introduction & Allegro, Mercure Divertissement, Vaughan Williams Fantasia on a Theme by Thomas Tallis
- Freedman Chalumeau: Centrediscs CNCO 983. (James Campbell, clarinet)
- CTL S5256 . Glick String Quartet #1: Prevost Ahimsa, (Robert Aitken, flute; Sandra Graham, mezzo-soprano; Elmer Iseler Singers), Haydn Serenade, Opus 3 #5, Mozart Serenade (Eine Kleine Nachtmusik), *Riley Concerto for String Quartet & Woodwind Doubler, (Moe Koffman, flute, saxophone, clarinet)
- CBC RCI550Hetu String Quaratet, Opus 29, Morawetz String Quartet #2
- Ofra Harnoy & The Orford String Quartet Plays The Beatles: Fanfare DFL 6002 (arrangements by Doug Riley). Musica Viva Mozart Quintet in A Major, K. 581
- Weber Quintet, Opus 34: CBC Musica Viva MVCD1032 (James Campbell, clarinet)
- Orford Encores: Fanfare DFC 7008. Borodin Nocturne & Scherzo from Quartet #2, Dvorak Waltz, Opus 54 #1, Foster (arr. Pochon) Old Black Joe, Gagnon Tango, Gershwin Lullaby, Haydn Serenade from Quartet, Opus 3 #5, Lennon-McCartney (arr. Wilkins) Yesterday, MacMillan A Saint Malo, Puccini Crisantemi
- Moments magiques: FMCM 2 001. Juno Award-winning album for Best Classical Recording in the Solo/Chamber Music Category. Schubert Presto from Trio #2 Opus 100 D929, Dvorak Poco adagio and Finale from Trio Opus 65
