= Tania Miller =

Canadian conductor

Tania Miller (born August 28, 1969, in Foam Lake, Saskatchewan) is a Canadian conductor.

In October 2023, she was appointed Artistic Director and Conductor of Brott Music Festival and its two national Canadian training programs, the National Academy Orchestra of Canada and BrottOpera. She is currently Music Director Emerita of the Victoria Symphony following her retirement as music director, a post she had held since 2003. Prior to that, she was Assistant Conductor (2000–03) and then Associate Conductor (2003–04) of the Vancouver Symphony Orchestra. At the time of her appointment to the Victoria Symphony, Miller was 33 years old, and was the youngest conductor of a major Canadian orchestra. She was also the first woman appointed to lead such an orchestra. She was named Interim Principal Conductor of the Rhode Island Philharmonic Orchestra, following the death of music director Bramwell Tovey, in 2022.

Previous positions she has held include conductor and artistic director of Michigan Opera Works (Ann Arbor), conductor of Opera McGill (Montréal), conductor of the ERGO contemporary chamber ensemble, and assistant conductor of the Carmel Bach Festival (Carmel), 1997–2001. She has also made appearances conducting the National Arts Centre Orchestra (Ottawa), Orchestre Métropolitain, Toronto Symphony, Orchestra London, CBC Radio Orchestra, Saskatoon Symphony Orchestra, Kitchener-Waterloo Symphony, Winnipeg Symphony, Edmonton Symphony, Calgary Philharmonic, Seattle Symphony, Chicago Symphony, Oregon Symphony, Tucson Symphony, Naples Symphony, Toledo Symphony, Elgin Symphony, Hartford Symphony, Bern Symphony Orchestra and Vermont Symphony Orchestra.

Miller grew up in Saskatchewan, where she began studying piano and organ at age 8. She became the organist and choir conductor at her church when she was 13. She received her bachelor's degree in music from the University of Saskatchewan in 1991, and received both her masters (1997) and doctoral (2000) degrees in conducting from the University of Michigan in Ann Arbor. She lives in Vancouver with her husband and two sons.
