= Artaria String Quartet =

- Also known as: Artaria Quartet of Boston
- Origin: Boston, United States
- Genre: Classical
- Occupation: String quartet
- Instruments: 2 violins, 1 viola, 1 cello
- Years active: 1986–present
- Labels: Aequebis Recordings, Centaur
- Members: Ray Shows, violin Nancy Oliveros, violin Annalee Wolf, viola Rebecca Merblum, cello
- Website: www.artariaquartet.com

The Artaria String Quartet (originally the Artaria Quartet of Boston) is an American string quartet based in Minnesota and now in residence at St. John the Evangelist Church designed by Cass Gilbert at 60 Kent Street on Summit Hill in St Paul. Previously the Quartet was in residence at Viterbo University and Boston College. Originally formed in Boston, the quartet was mentored by members of the Budapest, La Salle, Kolisch, and Juilliard quartets. Artaria centers on string quartet performance and education.

== Members ==
- Ray Shows, violin
- Nancy Oliveros, violin
- Annalee Wolf, viola
- Rebecca Merblum, cello

== History of Artaria ==
The Artaria Quartet of Boston was formed at Boston University in 1986 by Raphael Hillyer and mentored by Eugene Lehner. Lehner was their primary teacher and actually named the ensemble. The group was also coached by the [Muir String Quartet] at BU. In 1988 Artaria was invited to teach at the quartet seminar (directed by Norman Fischer) at the Boston UniversityTanglewood Institute in the Berkshires. In 1990 they were prizewinners in the Alliance Auditions. They were also Artist Diploma students at the Longy School of Music in Cambridge, Massachusetts. In 1992, the AQB competed in the Banff International String Quartet Competition along with the St. Lawrence, Ying, Mandelring, Amati, Miami, Amernet, Harrington and Italian quartets. That same year, on the recommendation of Marcia Ferritto, they were invited to Washington DC to audition for the National Endowments newly created Rural Residency program and were hosted by the Tifton, Georgia Arts Council for the 1992–93 season. The following year they were invited to join the faculty of Boston College and Viterbo University in La Crosse, Wisconsin where they performed, coached, taught classes and at Viterbo, created a successful New Music Festival. These residency appointments ended in 1997. In 1999 and 2000 the ASQ was again invited to teach and perform at the Tanglewood Institute.

In 2001 the quartet relocated to the Twin Cities (changing its name to Artaria String Quartet) where they present an annual concert series at Sundin Music Hall and mentor young string players in the Artaria Chamber Music School. In 2004 they won a McKnight Award for Performing Artists performing music by Schubert, Shostakovich and Syler. Artaria continues to concertize across the region at public and private venues, on the radio and on public television. The quartet also directs the Stringwood Summer Music Festival in Lanesboro, Minnesota. The group has commissioned many works for string quartet by composers Marjorie Merryman, Auguste Read Thomas, Tom Oboe Lee, David Cleary, Anthony Greene, and James Syler.

Their most recent major projects were performing the Beethoven and Bartok Cycles and recording the complete quartets of Dmitri Shostakovich. Their Shostakovich cycle was a premiere for the Twin Cities.

== Discography ==
The Artaria String Quartet has released five albums through their self-produced Aequbis Recordings, and one album of the String Quartets of David Cleary.

Release date	Label	Album
1994	Inventing Situations: Music for String Quartet by David Cleary	Centaur CRC2251
1995	Music of Brahms & Debussy	Aequebis Recordings
2000	Music of Haydn and Shostakovich	Aequebis Recordings
2003	An Artaria Winter Holiday	Aequebis Recordings
2011	Music of Mozart & Shostakovich	Aequebis Recordings
2016	Music of Haydn & Dvorak	Aequebis Recordings
