= Alexander Brott =

Canadian conductor, composer, violinist and music teacher (born 1915)

- Born: March 14, 1915; Montreal, Quebec
- Died: April 1, 2005 (aged 90)
- Education: Schulich School of Music at McGill University; Juilliard School
- Spouse: Lotte
- Children: Boris Brott and Denis Brott

Alexander Brott, CM CQ, born Joël Brod (March 14, 1915 – April 1, 2005), was a Canadian conductor, composer, violinist and music teacher.

== Early life and education ==
Brott was born in Montreal, Quebec. He earned degrees from the Schulich School of Music at McGill University and the Juilliard School. Among his teachers were Albert Chamberland and Alfred Whitehead.

== Career ==
Brott began his career as a concert violinist in the 1930s. He joined the faculty at McGill University in 1939, where he taught orchestration and music history. He founded and directed the McGill Chamber Orchestra. His work was also part of the music event in the art competition at the 1948 Summer Olympics.

Brott was leader of the Montreal Orchestra, Les Concerts symphoniques de Montréal and the Montreal Symphony Orchestra from 1945 to 1958. In 1939, he joined the Faculty of Music at McGill University, where he remained until 1980. He was also the founder and musical director of the McGill Chamber Orchestra. He also conducted the Kingston Symphony from 1965 to 1981.

In 1967, he conducted the McGill Chamber Orchestra at the official opening of the Centennial Theatre at Bishop's University in Lennoxville, Quebec, Canada.

In 1979 he was made a Member of the Order of Canada and in 1988 he was made a Knight of the National Order of Quebec. He retired from his position as professor and head of the department of orchestral instruments at McGill in 1980.

His memoirs, Alexander Brott: My Lives in Music (with co-writer Betty Nygaard King), were published by Mosaic Press in 2005.

He died in Montreal in 2005 at the age of 90. That year an album of recordings of his compositions, including his 1950 "Violin Concerto" and 1957 "Arabesque for cello and orchestra", with soloists Angèle Dubeau and Denis Brott. Also included were "Seven Minuets and Six Canons" (1971) and "Paraphrase in Polyphony" (1967).

== Personal life ==
Brott's wife Lotte was a renowned cellist and arts administrator. They had two sons, both highly accomplished musicians in their own right: late conductor Boris Brott, and Denis Brott, a cellist and conductor.

== Compositions ==
Among Brott's compositions include:

- 4 Squares
- Arabesque (1957) for cello and orchestra
- Circle
- Paraphrase in Polyphony
- Psalmody for unaccompanied cello
- Seven Minuets and Six Canons (1971)
- Songs of Contemplation (1976), four settings for soprano and orchestra
- Violin Concerto (1950)

== Publications ==
- Alexander Brott: My Lives in Music. By Alexander Brott and Betty Nygaard King. Oakville, Ont.: Mosaic Press, 2005. xiii, 228 p., ill. ISBN 0-88962-854-8.
