= Kingston Symphony =

The Kingston Symphony (KS) is a Canadian orchestra based in Kingston, Ontario. Since 2014 the principal conductor of the symphony has been Evan Mitchell. The ensemble performs most of its concerts at The Grand Theatre.

== History ==
The orchestra was founded in 1953 under the name the New Symphony Association of Kingston. The first principal conductor was Graham George; he led the orchestra's debut concert of Joseph Haydn's The Creation on 12 April 1954 at The Grand Theatre with the Kingston Choral Society and baritone James Milligan. For its first three years the orchestra performed only two concerts a year, but the number of concerts increased steadily beginning in 1957.

Principal conductors for the next few years were William Hill (1957–1959), and Edouard Bartlett (1960–1965). The ensemble was renamed the Kingston Symphony in 1963 with the formation of a new umbrella organization the Kingston Symphony Association. Some of the concerts were held at the Kingston Gospel Temple.

Alexander Brott was brought in as conductor in 1965, and during his tenure the orchestra was able to hire a number of professional string and wind players. Kingston's newly renovated Grand Theatre became the orchestra's main concert venue.

Brian Jackson was hired as conductor in 1982, and remained in this post until 1991. By this time the Symphony was performing about twelve concerts per year.

In 1992, Glen Fast took over as conductor. Under his direction, the KS made a change towards playing new works by Canadian composers. The orchestra has given the world premieres of Chan Ka Nin's Violin Concerto (1998); Marjan Mozetich's Piano Concerto (2000); Srul Irving Glick's last work, Isaiah (2002); John Burge's Clarinet Concerto (2004); István Anhalt's The Tents of Abraham (2005); and Peter Paul Koprowski's Tapestries of Love: Symphony for Soprano and Orchestra (2007).

Fast remained with the Symphony until 2014, at which time Evan Mitchell became conductor.
