= Brott Music Festival =

- Genre: Classical, Opera, Broadway, Pops, Jazz
- Dates: June, July, August
- Locations: Hamilton, Ontario, Canada
- Years active: 1988–present
- Founders: Boris Brott
- Website: brottmusic.com

Brott Music Festival (formerly Boris Brott Summer Music Festival) presents annual classical, opera, jazz, pops, and children's education concerts in Hamilton, Halton and Niagara regions in Ontario, Canada as well as touring to other music festivals in southern Ontario. The festival was founded by late conductor Boris Brott and has grown into Ontario's only and Canada's largest orchestral music festival. The orchestra in residence is the National Academy Orchestra of Canada, Canada's only professional orchestral training program. It is also home to BrottOpera, a training program for Canadian emerging opera singers. Its current artistic director is Tania Miller.

== History ==
The festival began as a way to provide cultural activity during the summer months in Hamilton, Ontario, and was founded as a two-week summer music festival in 1988 by conductor Boris Brott. Its budget has increased from $50,000 to under $1.5 million, and it has become Canada's largest orchestral music festival. It is praised in music circles for emphasizing nontraditional and multidisciplinary performances. Brott draws musicians from across Canada. The orchestra in residence is the National Academy Orchestra of Canada, which is a training program for aspiring professional musicians. The NAO is the only program of its kind in Canada and is similar to the Orchestra of the New World in Florida.

BMF's main activities take place in June, July, and August annually, but the festival also presents educational concerts for elementary students at Hamilton Place every autumn and three performances of Handel's Messiah every December.

BMF performs in concert hall settings such as Hamilton Place, Dofasco Centre for the Performing Arts, Mohawk College's McIntyre Theatre and the Glenn Gould Studio in Toronto. It also performs in churches, including Christ's Church Cathedral, Melrose United, St. Christopher's Anglican in Burlington, West Highland Baptist, and St. John's Anglican in Ancaster. Other venues include the Royal Botanical Gardens, Dundurn Castle, Whitehern Museum, and the Art Gallery of Hamilton.

== Festival highlights ==
- 1988 - BMF founded by late Artistic Director Boris Brott in 10-day Festival in Hamilton
- 1989 - Brott founds the NAO, a mentor-apprentice training program, with masterclasses & seminars, prepares its graduates for realities of life as professional artists. The NAO becomes BMF's orchestra in residence.
- 1995 - BMF begins first of its annual NAO “runouts” which enrich other Ontario festivals with orchestral repertoire & provide touring experience for students
- 1997 - BMF gives first annual concert on front lawn at the newly restored Windermere House at Lake Rousseau, Ontario
- 1998 - NAO recognized as a National Training School by the Department of Canadian Heritage
- 1999 - BMF expands programming to add Children's Education Concert series at Hamilton Place & Handel's Messiah to its annual performance calendar
- 2000 - NAO profiled in a documentary on CBC's The National. Brott conducts Bernstein's Mass at the Vatican for Pope John Paul II
- 2000 - NAO and BMF garner national attention with appearances by former Prime Minister of Canada Kim Campbell who narrates a performance with her spouse, Broadway star Hershey Felder
- 2002 - NAO performs for Pope John Paul II & 800,000 for World Youth Day in Toronto
- 2005 - World premiere of Barbara Croall Assiginaak's Midawewe' Igan - The Sound of the Drum".
- 2006 - Canada's first person in space, astronaut Marc Garneau guest stars in Music & Space. Members of the NAO and an actor portraying Mozart visit Holy Family Elementary School to say Happy 250th Anniversary to Mozart
- 2007 - 20th Anniversary celebration of BMF. Mahler's 8th Symphony of a Thousand is performed as 20th anniversary summer finale with an orchestra of 120, a choir of 250, eight soloists, The Brantford Children's Chorus, and eight off-stage brass. Over 30 of the 120 orchestral musicians were NAO alumni who returned from all over Canada to join in the celebration. Concert is sold out and receives a 6-minute standing ovation and five curtain calls. It was only the work's eighth performance in Canadian history and a first for Hamilton.
- 2008 - World premieres of BMF-commissioned Dagwaagin (It is Autumn) by Barbara Croall Assiginaak and Omar Daniel's Alouette Variations: A Canadian Young Person's Guide to the Orchestra.
- 2009 - NAO performs for Secretary of State Hillary Clinton
- 2014 - BMF collaborates with Canadian superstar rock band Arkells (2015) for a secret a pop-up performance debuting their gold and JUNO award winning album High Noon and reunited with the band to become the first orchestra in 10 years to play at the 2015 JUNO Awards
- 2014 - BrottOpera and its Emerging Artists Program founded after the collapse of Opera Hamilton
- 2020 - BMF receives national media attention for a successful pivot to online training during COVID pandemic lockdown
- 2021 - BMF performs five sold out drive-in/outdoor concerts in accordance with COVID protocols
- May 2022 - BMF names Alain Trudel interim artistic director after the sudden & tragic loss of Boris Brott
- October 2023 - Tania Miller is named artistic director and conductor

== Boris Brott and educational programs ==
The festival re-introduced music education performances to Hamilton in 1999. Since then, the NAO has performed for over 144,000 schoolchildren from across southern Ontario. It is estimated that Boris Brott introduced classical music to one million children during his career. He has written over 300 scripted children's concerts, such as Welcome Bach, Meet Mr. Beethoven; Trick or Treat to a Wicked Beat; There's an Animal in My Orchestra; Boris the Explorer: So You Want to Sing?; and J.S. Bach Meets Glenn Gould. Brott Music Education Concert highlights over the past nine years have included:

- The Sophia Diaries: A Musical Exploration of Canada in the 1840s
- The Underground Railroad: A Musical Journey narrated by Hon. Lincoln Alexander
- Animal Crackers with Ottawa Dance Studio
- Music in Space with astronaut Marc Garneau
- From Ghost Ships to Space Ships: Musical Explorations with astronaut Roberta Bondar
- Music & The Inuit Spirit with throat singers, drum dancers, and soapstone carvers
- Melodies & Myths: A celebration of Aboriginal Music featuring the world premiere of Barbara Croall Assiginaak's Mi'degaawen

== Awards and honours ==
BMF received the Tourism Ambassador Award from Tourism Hamilton and Tourism Business of the Year (under 50,000). Boris Brott was awarded the Order of Ontario in 2006, Lifetime Achievement Awards from Tourism Hamilton and the City of Hamilton Arts Awards in 2007, and the National Child Day Award from the Canadian Institute for Child Health in Ottawa in November 2007. In May 2006, he was voted one of the top five Greatest Hamiltonians of all time by readers of The Hamilton Spectator.
