= Bonjour Stradivarius =

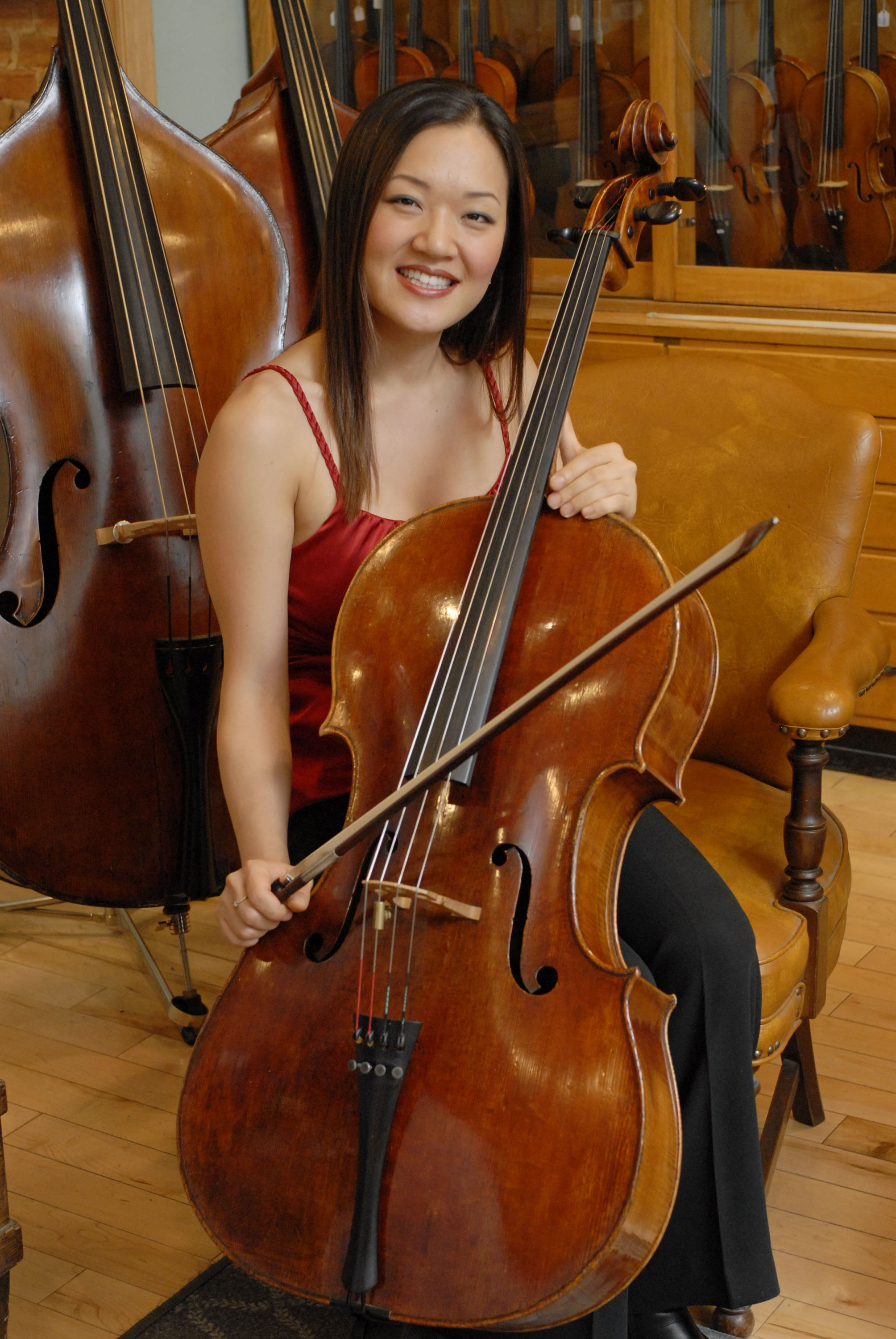
Bonjour Stradivarius

The Bonjour Stradivari cello was made by famous luthier Antonio Stradivari 1692. The instrument is named after the amateur 19th-century Parisian cellist Abel Bonjour.

On the death of Bonjour sometime after 1885 the cello passed via Fridolin Hamma of Stuttgart to Dr. Hans Kühne of Cologne, who loaned the cello to the Stradivari Bicentennial exhibition in Cremona in 1937. Other owners include The Habisreutinger Foundation of St. Gallen, Switzerland, soloist Robert Cohen (who played it between 1984 and 1993) and Martin Lovett of the Amadeus Quartet. The present owner acquired it in the fall of 1999 and it is currently on loan to The Canada Council for the Arts Instrument Bank, which then loans this instrument for 3 years to the winner of its national competition. After being loaned to Korean-Canadian cellist Soo Bae for 3 years, it was awarded in September 2009 to Canadian cellist Rachel Mercer, in 2012 to Arnold Choi of Calgary, in 2015 to Cameron Crozman, and in 2018 to Bryan Cheng.

== See also ==
- List_of_Stradivarius_instruments#Cellos
