= Boris Brott =

Canadian conductor and motivational speaker (1944–2022)

Boris Brott OC OOnt OQ
- Born: March 14, 1944; Montreal, Quebec, Canada
- Died: April 5, 2022 (aged 78); Hamilton, Ontario, Canada
- Education: Conservatoire de musique du Québec à Montréal; McGill Conservatory
- Occupations: conductor, motivational speaker
- Spouse: Ardyth Webster
- Children: 3

Boris Brott, OC OOnt OQ (March 14, 1944 – April 5, 2022) was a Canadian conductor and motivational speaker. He conducted on stages around the world, including Carnegie Hall, La Scala, and Covent Garden. Over his career, he commissioned, performed, and recorded a wide variety of Canadian works for orchestra.

Brott was the founder and artistic director of the Brott Music Festival, National Academy Orchestra of Canada and BrottOpera all based in Hamilton, Ontario. He was the founding Music Director and Conductor Laureate of the New West Symphony in Thousand Oaks, CA and artistic director and conductor of the Orchestre classique de Montreal (formerly the McGill Chamber Orchestra). He was a former Principal Youth and Family conductor with the National Arts Centre Orchestra in Ottawa and Toronto Symphony Orchestra, where he led family and education programs.

== Early life and emerging career ==
Boris Jeremiah Brott was born in Montreal in 1944 to violinist and composer Alexander Brott and cellist Lotte/Charlotte Brott (née Goetzel). His younger brother is cellist Denis Brott. His mother was born in Mannheim, Germany, a country she had left in 1939 because of the Nazis. His family was Jewish. He studied violin with his father, and performed at the age of five with the Montreal Symphony Orchestra at a young people's matinee. He took courses at the Conservatoire de musique du Québec à Montréal and the McGill Conservatory, and in 1956 studied conducting at the summer school of Pierre Monteux, who engaged him as assistant for concerts in Europe. He next studied with Igor Markevitch and won first prize at the 1958 Pan-American conducting competition. In 1959, at the age of 15, he founded the Philharmonic Youth Orchestra of Montreal and led it in his conducting debut in that city.

In 1961, Brott won the annual Anthony W. Amor Memorial Trophy along with a scholarship at Westhill High School for excelling in music.

In June 1962, Brott won third prize at the Liverpool Competition. He served from 1963 to 1965 as Walter Susskind's assistant conductor with the Toronto Symphony Orchestra and then embarked on a career in England as conductor of the Northern Sinfonia at Newcastle upon Tyne (1964-8). He made several tours with this chamber orchestra, among which was one in Canada, which included concerts at Expo 67.

From 1964 to 1967, Brott was principal conductor for the touring company of the Royal Ballet Covent Garden. During the 1965–6 season at Covent Garden he conducted the Royal Ballet's first production at that theatre of Stravinsky's The Soldier's Tale (1966) and toured the production in Britain. He won first prize and a gold medal at the sixth Dimitri Mitropoulos International Music Competition in 1968 and served 1968-9 as assistant conductor to Leonard Bernstein, with the New York Philharmonic Orchestra.

Brott was named one of Canada's Outstanding Young Men in 1969 and 1973 by the Junior Chamber of Commerce.

In 1972, Brott was appointed conductor of the BBC Welsh Orchestra.

== Later career ==
=== Development of Canadian orchestras ===
Brott directed the Lakehead Symphony Orchestra (Thunder Bay Symphony Orchestra) between 1967 and 1972 and the Regina Symphony Orchestra from 1971 to 1973.

From 1969 to 1990, Brott was artistic director and conductor of the Hamilton Philharmonic Orchestra, which grew from an amateur ensemble to a professional one with a 42-week season and 16,000 subscribers. The orchestra also gave birth to the quintet Canadian Brass. Brott and the HPO were in the news when they performed in the middle of a steel factory blast furnace in Hamilton's industrial core at Dofasco Inc.- now Arcelor Mittal. Brott included visual elements, ballet dancers, Shakespearean actors, film, rock groups, and astronauts to the stages of classical music concerts.

In the early 1970s, he played a role in the acoustic aspects of the construction Hamilton Place, now known as First Ontario Concert Hall in downtown Hamilton. He conducted the first notes heard in the hall on September 22, 1973.

In 1975, Brott assumed directorship of the CBC Winnipeg Orchestra. In 1977 he had made his opera debut, conducting Donizetti's Daughter of the Regiment for the COC. Brott later directed Opera Hamilton and guest-conducted with the Canadian Opera Company and Sadler's Wells Opera.

Brott served as the Principal Youth and Family conductor with both the National Arts Centre Orchestra in Ottawa and the Toronto Symphony Orchestra. From 1982 to 1985 he was artistic director of Symphony Nova Scotia. He led the Ontario Place Pops Orchestra from 1983 to 1991.

=== Founding of Brott Music Festival, National Academy Orchestra of Canada and BrottOpera ===
In 1988, he founded the Brott Music Festival, which has since become Canada's largest orchestral music festival. It is a major cultural event in Hamilton and surrounding areas for the months of July and August. From that, he created the National Academy Orchestra of Canada, recognized in 1999 as a National School by the Department of Canadian Heritage. The NAO pairs music graduates pursuing a career with professional musicians from North American orchestras in a mentor-apprentice relationship. It is Canada's only professional training orchestra and has graduated about 1,200 musicians. In 2015 after Opera Hamilton folded, he founded BrottOpera with a similar model as the NAO—to provide performance opportunities for emerging young singers in the City of Hamilton.

During this period, Brott also became the first music director of the New West Symphony, Thousand Oaks, California, where he remained as Maestro for 17 years. He also took over the role of Music Director at McGill Chamber Orchestra from his father, who founded the ensemble in 1945. He remained its leader, now known as Orchestre Classique de Montreal until his death.

=== Law school, lecturing, broadcasting and recording ===
Brott studied law at the University of Western Ontario from 1992 to 1995, and in 1995 began giving motivational seminars to Fortune 500 companies using symphonic music as an example of teamwork at the highest level. Brott produced, conducted, or hosted television and radio programs for the CBC, and the BBC and ITV in the UK, and recorded with various orchestras for Canadian Broadcasting Corporation, Mercury, Pro-Arte and Sony Classical.

=== Italian Opera 2000–2022 ===
Brott embarked on a guest conducting schedule at Italy's opera houses, including the Teatro Petruzzelli, the Arena di Verona and the Teatro Giuseppe Verdi in Trieste. In 2000, he conducted the first performance of Bernstein's Mass in Vatican City for an audience which included Pope John Paul II.

In 2011, Brott was named Principal Guest Conductor of the historic Petruzzelli Theatre in Bari, Italy.

== Honours ==
In 1986, Brott was made an Officer of the Order of Canada. In 2006, he was made a Member of the Order of Ontario. In 2014, he was appointed Officer of l’Ordre national du Québec.

In May 2006, he was voted one of the top five Greatest Hamiltonians of all time by Hamilton Spectator readers. In 2007, he was given the Lifetime Achievement Award by Tourism Hamilton and was also awarded Canada's National Child Day award in Ottawa for introducing classical music to over a million schoolchildren over his career. Also in 2007, he received the City of Hamilton Lifetime Achievement Arts Award.

In June 2022, the City of Hamilton announced that the Great Hall of First Ontario Concert Hall, formerly Hamilton Place, would be named Boris Brott Great Hall, in memory of the conductor who opened the Hall 50 years earlier.

== Personal life and death ==
Brott was married to author and lawyer Ardyth Webster Brott, CM. He made his permanent home in Hamilton, Ontario. He died on April 5, 2022, at the age of 78, when he was struck while walking in a hit-and-run collision by a driver who was speeding in the opposite direction on a one-way street, near Brott's home in Hamilton.

The news shocked Canada and the world's classical music community, most intensely in Hamilton. In June 2022, then Hamilton Mayor Fred Eisenberger announced the naming of Great Hall Boris Brott at First Ontario Concert Hall he had helped to build 50 years earlier. Brott is buried in Montreal's Mont Royal Cemetery with his parents.
