= National Academy Orchestra of Canada =

Professional training orchestra

The National Academy Orchestra of Canada (NAO) is a professional training orchestra primarily based in Hamilton, Ontario, Canada. Founded in 1989 by late conductor Boris Brott, it is currently helmed by artistic director and Conductor Tania Miller. The NAO is recognized as a Canadian National School for professional training. Each year, hundreds of Canadian musicians audition for a spot in the orchestra.

The National Academy Orchestra is the orchestra-in-residence of the 36-year-old Brott Music Festival, Ontario's only and Canada's largest orchestral music festival. Young musicians who are recent graduates of a music program are eligible to apply and audition for one of 40-50 positions in the annual program.

== Training approach ==
The program is based on the Mentor-Apprentice approach to learning, and successful applicants are often paired in the stands with established professionals from North America and Europe's finest orchestras.

Each season features guest concertmasters and mentors from North America and Europe, guest conductors, and master classes with internationally renowned soloists. Performance opportunities range from orchestral, chamber, to solo performance. These are not the only aspect of the NAO's activities - the orchestra also takes part in mock auditions, seminars, and performance classes.

The NAO places particular emphasis on entrepreneurial skills through master classes and seminars. It also incorporates a real-to-life rehearsal and performance schedule as part of its training program.

== Similarity to New World Orchestra ==
The NAO is the only program of its kind in Canada. The only other similar program is the New World Orchestra under Michael Tilson Thomas, based in Miami, Florida.

== Graduates ==
1200 graduates from the National Academy Orchestra hold, or have held positions with every major orchestra across Canada and orchestras and ensembles across North America and around the world.

== History and highlights ==
In 1989, one year after Boris Brott created the Boris Brott Summer Music Festival, now known as Brott Music Festival, he formed a mentor-apprentice training program to become the National Academy Orchestra, the Festival's orchestra-in-residence. In 1998 the NAO gained status as a National Arts Training Program in Canada.

In 2000, Brott and the NAO were profiled in a documentary on CBC's The National and garners national attention with appearances by former Prime Minister of Canada Kim Campbell who narrates a performance with her spouse, Broadway star Hershey Felder.

In 2002, NAO performed for Pope John Paul II & 800,000 for World Youth Day in Toronto

In 2007, NAO performed Mahler's Symphony No. 8, Symphony of a Thousand as 20th anniversary summer finale with NAO alumni who returned from all over Canada to join in the celebration. It was only the work's eighth performance in Canadian history and its first for Hamilton.

In 2008, NAO World premieres of BMF-commissioned Dagwaagin (It is Autumn) by Barbara Croall Assiginaak, the beginning of a long association with the distinguished Odawa composer and Indigenous instrumentalist.

In 2009, NAO performed for then-Secretary of State Hillary Rodham Clinton in the middle of Niagara Falls' Rainbow Bridge to celebrate the 100th anniversary of the Boundary Waters Treaty between the two countries.

In 2014, NAO collaborated with Canadian superstar rock band Arkells for a secret a pop-up performance celebrating the release of their gold album High Noon and goes on to be the first orchestra in 10 years to play at the 2015 JUNO Awards, again with Arkells. NAO also performed for closing ceremonies of 2015 Pan Am Games.

In 2020, NAO received national media attention for a successful pivot to online training during COVID pandemic lockdown and in 2021, performed at five sold out drive-in/outdoor concerts in accordance with COVID protocols and the filmed world premiere of the first Indigenous opera for children by a Canadian (Odawa) composer, Barbara Assiginaak's Kikzootadwaak "They Are Playing Hide and Seek".

In May 2022, trombonist, conductor and composer Alain Trudel stepped in as Interim Artistic Director after the sudden and tragic loss of Boris Brott.

In October 2023, Tania Miller was named NAO Artistic Director and Conductor.

== Funding support ==
The NAO is recognized as a National School and receives funding from the Canada Arts Training Fund (prior to 2009 called the National Arts Training Contribution Program) through the Department of Canadian Heritage.
