= Victoria Symphony =

Canadian orchestra

The Victoria Symphony is a Canadian orchestra based in Victoria, British Columbia. It is considered Vancouver Island's largest and best-known performing arts organization. Currently conducted by Danish conductor Christian Kluxen, the orchestra used to consist of 34 full-contract and 15 part-contract musicians, and has been downsized to 34 full-contract and 10 part-contract musicians as of 2024. Typically, the orchestra delivers more than fifty main series programs per season, as well as a two-week-long summer series. A highlight of the year for many Victorians is the annual Symphony Splash fund-raising concert, held on the Sunday of the August long weekend. For more than 30 years, the orchestra performed on a barge in Victoria's Inner Harbour for an estimated audience of thirty thousand— including those attending in kayaks, canoes or dragonboats immediately in front of the barge. The orchestra administration consists of a staff led by Matthew White, CEO, a board of directors, and many volunteers.

== History ==
The Victoria Symphony was founded in 1941 by members of the Royal Canadian Navy as an amateur ensemble. Melvin Knudsen served as the group's first conductor, leaving after seven years in 1948 when he was succeeded by Hans Gruber. Otto-Werner Mueller was appointed principal conductor in 1963, followed by Laszlo Gati in 1967. The orchestra became a professional ensemble during Gati's years in the mid 1970s.

In 1979, Paul Freeman left his junior position at the Detroit Symphony Orchestra to assume the position of principal conductor of the Victoria Symphony. Glen Fast served as his associate conductor beginning in 1983 and eventually replaced him for a short time as principal conductor in 1988 when Freeman retired. Peter McCoppin was appointed as conductor in 1989, a position he held until 1999 when Kees Bakels succeeded him. Bakels left in 2002 at which time Timothy Vernon was appointed interim music director. Tania Miller was the music director from 2003–2017. Danish conductor Christian Kluxen was appointed music director in 2016, and started this position in the 2017–2018 season.

The Canadian conductor Yannick Nézet-Séguin, who currently holds the position of music director of the Philadelphia Orchestra and the Metropolitan Opera—and has held or currently holds positions with the London Philharmonic and Rotterdam Philharmonic—held the position of Principal Guest Conductor of the Victoria Symphony from 2003 to 2007. Another Québécois musician and conductor, Alain Trudel, succeeded Nézet-Séguin in 2009, a position he held until 2013.

In 2016, the orchestra went on a cross-Canada tour to celebrate its 75th season.

Music Director Emeritus Tania Miller and the orchestra released two CDs of music by the Dutch composer Wim Zwaag, including a violin concerto performed by the orchestra's concertmaster Terence Tam.
