= Kingston Choral Society =

UK choir started in 1949

- Choir
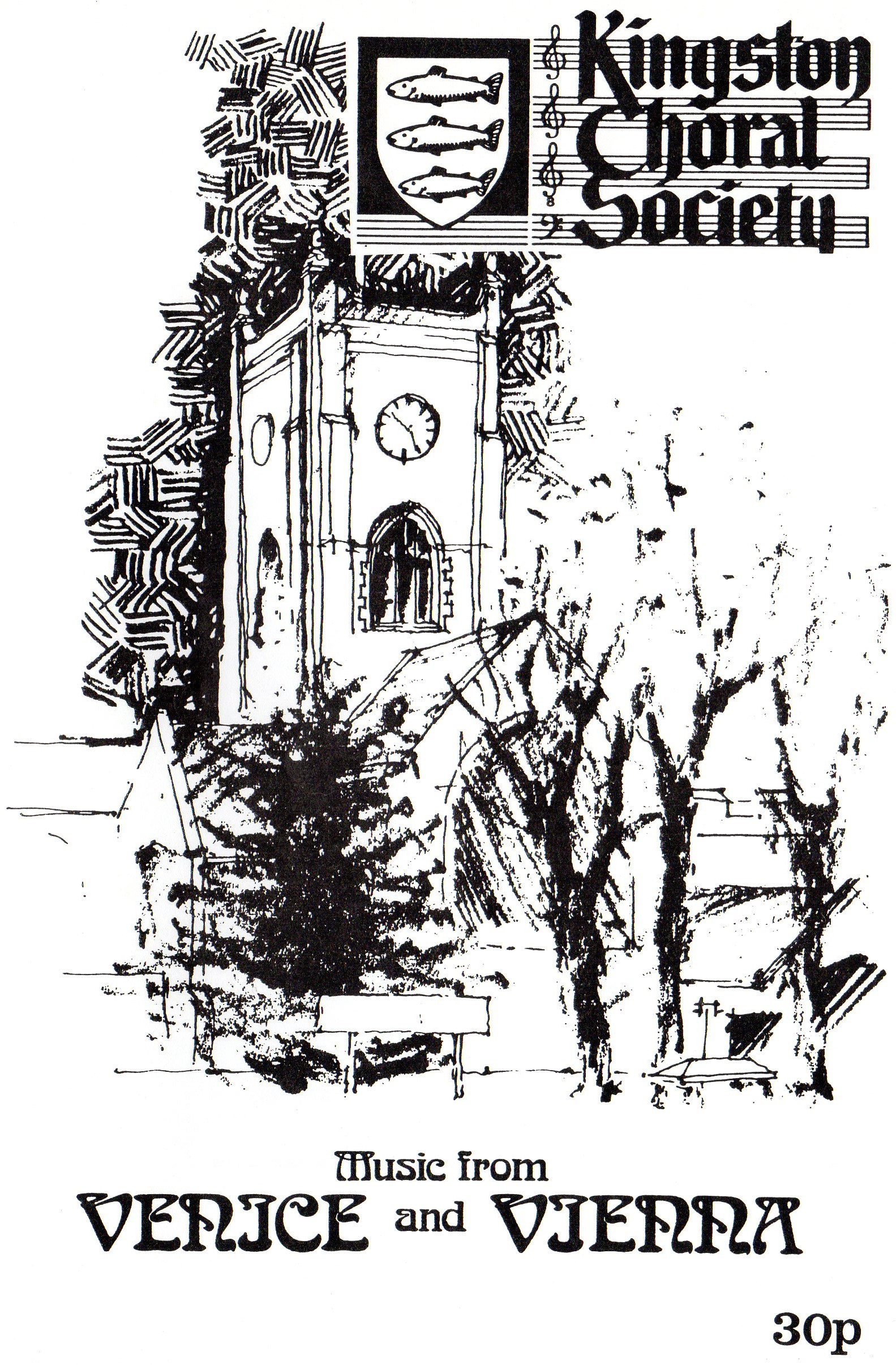
- Concert programme cover July 1987
- Origin: Kingston upon Thames, England, United Kingdom
- Founded: December 1949
- Genre: Classical
- Music director: John Wilkinson (1949–1980); Robin Page (1980–2008); Graham Ross (2008–2010); Andrew Griffiths (2011– present)
- Website: www.kingstonchoralsociety.org.uk

Kingston Choral Society is a large mixed-voice choir based in Kingston upon Thames in the UK. Originating in 1949, the choir in 2016 had around 140 auditioned members. It stages four concerts each year with professional musicians and soloists. Most of these concerts are held at All Saints Church, Kingston upon Thames, at St Andrew's Church, Surbiton, or at Cadogan Hall in central London.

== Beginnings ==
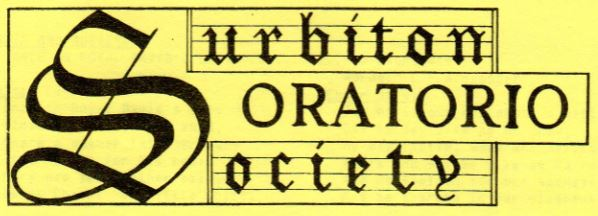
The Surbiton Oratorio Society logo in 1984

The history of Kingston Choral Society began in December 1949 when the Mayor of Surbiton gathered local church choirs to sing Handel's Messiah in March 1950. A nucleus of these singers stayed together and became Surbiton Oratorio Society. By 1985 the Society had become more closely involved with the Royal Borough of Kingston upon Thames and adopted its current name.

== 1980s to 2008 ==
In 1980 the choir was in the middle of rehearsals for a concert of Fanshawe's African Sanctus when John Wilkinson, its conductor of 30 years, left suddenly. Robin Page stepped into the breach to conduct that concert and stayed on as the choir's musical director for 27 years. During that time the choir performed with many professional soloists, including a young Sarah Connolly (now a Dame) in 1992. Towards the end of the century the choir commissioned a new work from Nicholas O'Neill, The Clocks of Cassiodorus, and performed it in 1999. In 2003 Kingston Choral Society joined with 46 other choirs to commission The Kestrel Road from Peter Maxwell Davies, under the auspices of Making Music, in celebration of his 70th birthday. The choir gave a concert performance of the work in 2005.

The choir occasionally performed abroad, notably in Delft (which was at that time twinned with Kingston upon Thames) in 1990, in Venice in 2004 and in New York City and Connecticut in 2007. Robin Page was also principal conductor of three orchestras and taught at the Royal Military School of Music.

== 2008 to present day ==
In 2008 the young composer and conductor Graham Ross took over the musical direction of the choir. In 2010 Ross conducted Handel's Messiah for the choir's 60th anniversary concert. He left Kingston Choral Society in 2010 to take on the post of Music Director at Clare College, Cambridge, which had been previously held by his colleague and supporter John Rutter.

Andrew Griffiths, a graduate of The Royal Opera's Jette Parker scheme for singers and conductors, became the choir's musical director in 2010. The choir participated several times in the Kingston Festival of the Voice organised by Kingston Arts. In 2013 the choir performed a new work, And Since to Look at things in Bloom, which they had commissioned from their former conductor Graham Ross. In July 2015 and again in July 2018 the choir hosted their namesakes, the Kingston Choral Society of Ontario, as well as the North Lakeshore Chorus, also from Canada, to give joint concerts in remembrance of the Canadian contributions made in World War I.

== Affiliations ==
Kingston Choral Society is a member of Making Music, the National Federation of Music Societies.

Kingston Choral Society is a Registered Charity in England and Wales. Its charitable objects are "the study and practice of choral music in order to educate the public in its arts and sciences, by the presentation of concerts and other activities."
