= Canadian classical music =

In Canada, classical music includes a range of musical styles rooted in the traditions of Western or European classical music that European settlers brought to the country from the 17th century and onwards. As well, it includes musical styles brought by other ethnic communities from the 19th century and onwards, such as Indian classical music (Hindustani and Carnatic music) and Chinese classical music. Since Canada's emergence as a nation in 1867, the country has produced its own composers, musicians and ensembles. As well, it has developed a music infrastructure that includes training institutions, conservatories, performance halls, and a public radio broadcaster, CBC, which programs a moderate amount of Classical music. There is a high level of public interest in classical music and education.

Canada has produced a number of respected ensembles, including the Montreal Symphony Orchestra and the Toronto Symphony Orchestra, as well as a number of well-known Baroque orchestras and chamber ensembles, such as the I Musici de Montréal Chamber Orchestra and the Tafelmusik Baroque Orchestra & Chamber Choir. Major Canadian opera companies such as the Canadian Opera Company have nurtured the talents of Canadian opera singers such as Maureen Forrester, Ben Heppner, and Jon Vickers. Well-known Canadian musicians include pianist Glenn Gould; pianist Ronald Turini, violinist James Ehnes; pianist Jan Lisiecki; conductor Yannick Nézet-Séguin; flautist Timothy Hutchins; and composers Claude Vivier, R. Murray Schafer, Harry Somers and Jacques Hétu. Well-known music schools include the Royal Conservatory of Music (Canada) in Toronto and the Schulich School of Music at McGill University in Montreal.

== Opera and vocal ==
=== Opera singers ===
A number of Canadian singers who learned their craft in Canadian opera companies went on to sing in major international opera houses.

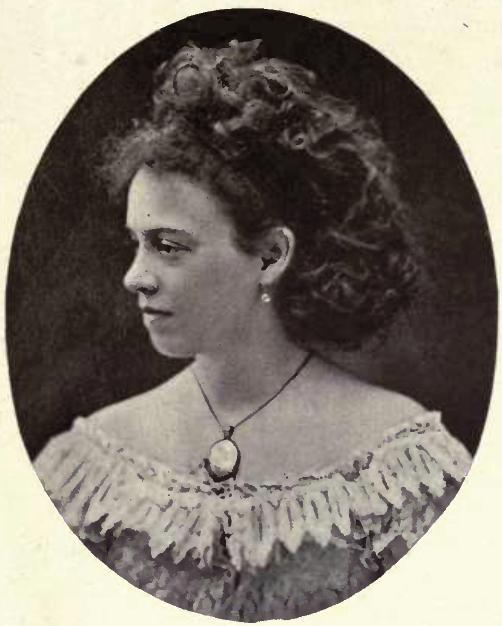
Sallie Holman, principal singer, Holman Opera Troupe

The Holman Opera Troupe, which toured throughout Canada in the 1860s–1880s, were at separate periods, lessees of the London Opera House, the Royal Lyceum, Toronto, the Grand Opera House, Ottawa, and the Theatre Royal, Montreal. The troupe consisted of Mr. George Holman, his wife, his daughter Sallie Holman (soprano/principal singer) another daughter, and two sons, with some others, including William H. Crane and Sallie's husband Mr. J. T. Dalton. Bertha May Crawford (1886–1934), a coloratura soprano from Toronto, was probably the only Canadian singer of her era to achieve significant success performing in major opera houses in Russia and Poland during the First World War and through the 1920s.

In the early 20th century, contralto singer Portia White (1911–1968) achieved international fame because of her voice and stage presence. As a Canadian of African descent, her popularity helped to open previously closed doors for talented blacks who followed. She has been declared "a person of national historic significance" by the Government of Canada. George London (1920–1985) was a Montreal-born concert and operatic bass-baritone. From 1975 until 1980 he was general director of the Washington Opera. Pierrette Alarie 1921, is a French-Canadian coloratura soprano. Lois Marshall (1924–1997) was a Canadian soprano who was made a Companion of the Order of Canada in 1967. She was both a concert and recital singer, first as a soprano and later as a mezzo-soprano.

Louis Quilico (1925–2000) was a Canadian baritone, known as "Mr Rigoletto." In Canada, Quilico performed regularly with the Canadian Opera Company in Toronto, and throughout the 1970s he performed in opera companies in the United States. Quilico's contemporary Jon Vickers (1926- 2015) is a tenor born in Prince Albert, Saskatchewan, who joined the Metropolitan Opera in 1960. A powerful "heldentenor", he became known for his German- and Italian-language roles. Maureen Forrester (1930–2010) was a Canadian operatic contralto known for her performances of Mahler and for her great stamina onstage. Victor Braun (1935–2001) was a Canadian-born operatic baritone who performed at major opera houses from Europe and North America. His contemporary Teresa Stratas (born 1938) is a soprano who had a 36-year career at the Metropolitan Opera. Judith Forst (born 1943) is a Canadian mezzo-soprano who was made an Officer of the Order of Canada in 1991.

Richard Margison (born 1953) is an operatic tenor who was named an Officer of the Order of Canada in 2001 and lives in Toronto, Ontario, Canada. Gino Quilico (born 1955) is a lyric baritone of Italian descent and the son of Canadian baritone Louis Quilico and Lina Pizzolongo. Ben Heppner (born 1956) is a tenor, specializing in opera and classical symphonic works for voice. performs frequently with major opera companies in the United States and Europe, as well as concert appearances with major symphony orchestras. Gerald Finley (born 1960) is a bass-baritone opera singer renowned for his interpretations of Mozart roles. Michael Schade (born 1965) is a Canadian operatic tenor, who was born in Geneva and raised in Germany and Canada; he is known as a "Mozart tenor". Russell Braun (born 1965) is an operatic lyric baritone, who is the son of baritone Victor Braun. Isabel Bayrakdarian (born 1974) is an Armenian-Canadian opera singer who moved to Canada as a teenager. James Westman (born 1972) is an operatic baritone, in his youth he was the first boy soprano to perform Gustav Mahler, 4th symphony with Leonard Bernstein. Joni Henson (born 1977 in Sault Ste. Marie, Ontario) and Measha Brueggergosman (born 1977 in Fredericton, New Brunswick) are both Sopranos that perform regularly both in concert and in fully staged Operas.

=== Opera companies ===
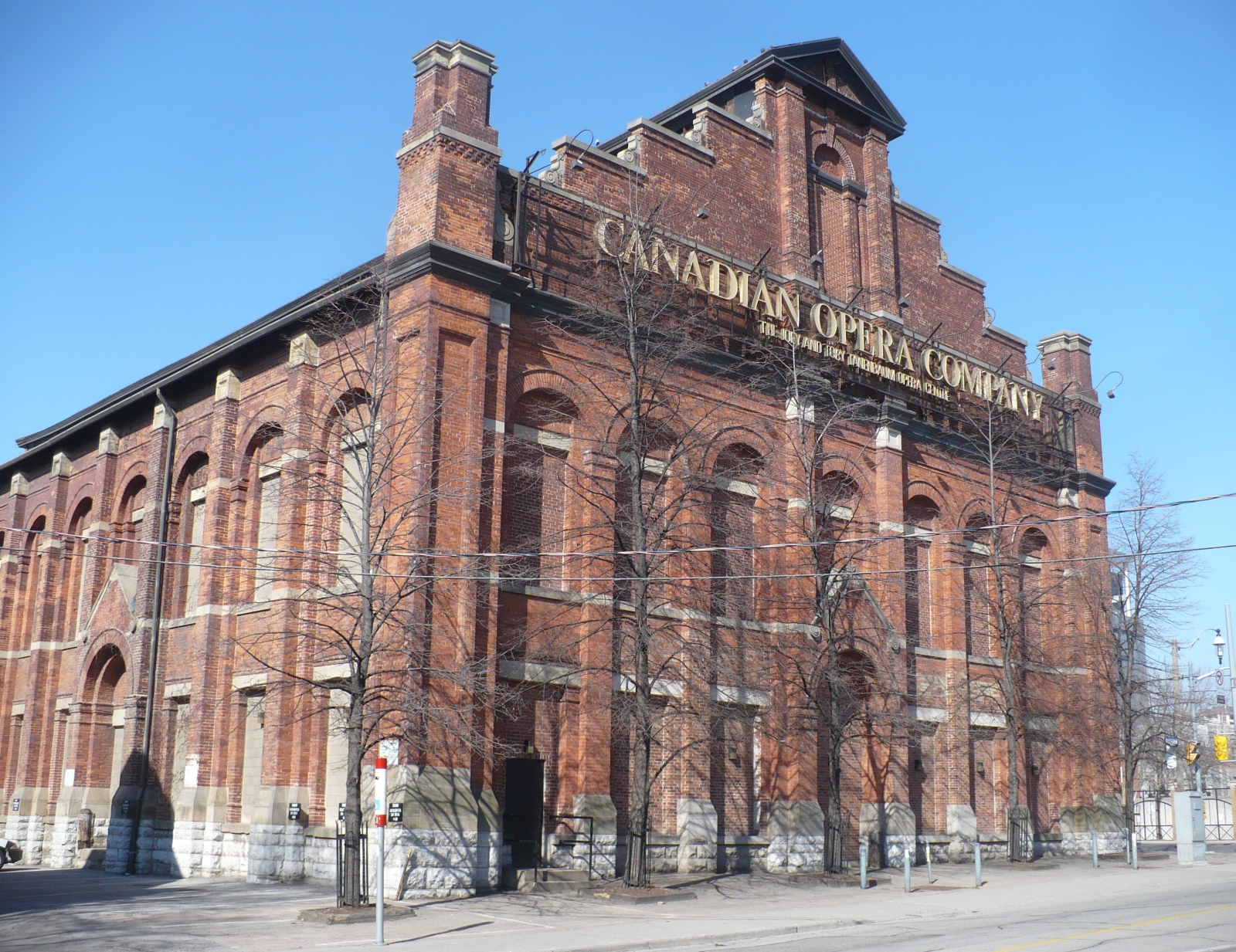
Tannenbaum Opera Centre, Toronto

- Canadian Opera Company
- Opera Atelier
- Opéra de Montréal
- Vancouver Opera
- Manitoba Opera
- Opera in Concert
- Opera Lyra Ottawa
- Calgary Opera
- Edmonton Opera
- Opera Hamilton
- Opéra de Québec
- Pacific Opera Victoria

=== Choirs ===
- Toronto Mendelssohn Choir
- Amadeus Choir
- Nathaniel Dett Chorale
- Tafelmusik Chamber Choir
- Ottawa Bach Choir
- Theatre of Early Music

== Ensembles and performers ==
=== Orchestras and ensembles ===
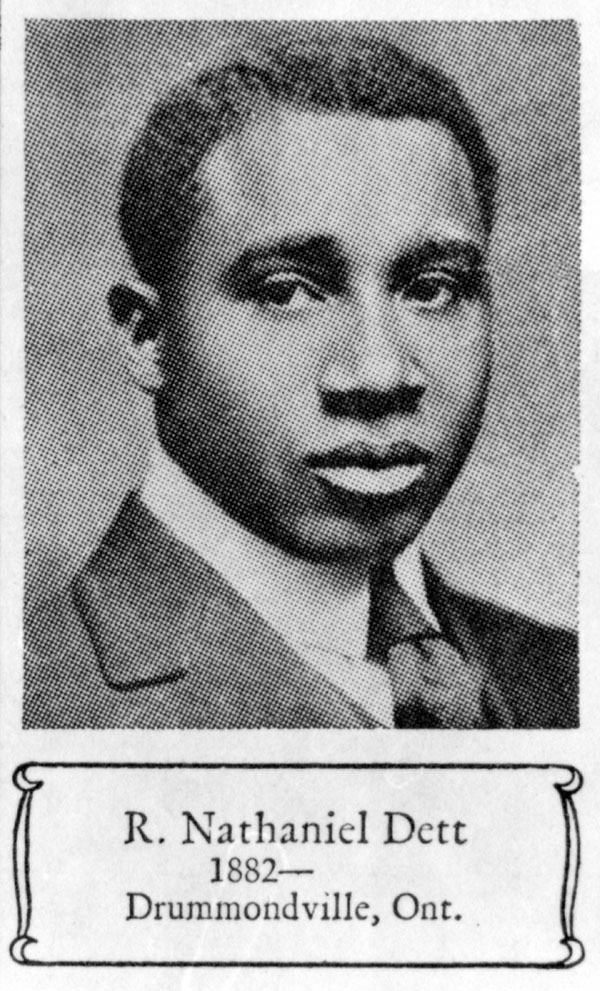
R. Nathaniel Dett (1882–1943), African-Canadian composer, pianist and conductor

Symphony orchestras:

- Victoria Symphony
- Vancouver Symphony Orchestra
- Calgary Philharmonic
- Edmonton Symphony Orchestra
- Saskatoon Symphony
- Regina Symphony Orchestra
- Winnipeg Symphony Orchestra
- Thunder Bay Symphony Orchestra
- Kingston Symphony Orchestra
- Hamilton Philharmonic Orchestra
- Toronto Symphony Orchestra
- National Arts Centre Orchestra
- Orchestre Métropolitain du Grand Montréal
- Montreal Symphony Orchestra
- Orchestre Symphonique de Québec (Quebec Symphony Orchestra)
- Symphony New Brunswick
- Symphony Nova Scotia
- Newfoundland Symphony Orchestra

Community orchestras:

- Oakville Symphony Orchestra
- Ottawa Symphony Orchestra
- Prince Edward Island Symphony Orchestra

Baroque orchestras and chamber ensembles:

- Amati Quartet
- New Orford String Quartet
- Quatuor Bozzini
- Canadian Brass
- Canadian Chamber Ensemble
- I Musici de Montréal Chamber Orchestra
- Les Violons du Roy
- Tafelmusik Baroque Orchestra
- Quartetto Gelato
- Manitoba Chamber Orchestra

=== Instrumentalists ===
==== Pianists ====
Alberto Guerrero (1886–1959) was a Chilean-Canadian composer, pianist, and teacher whose students included Glenn Gould and Jon Kimura Parker. Glenn Gould (1932–1982) was noted for his recordings of the music of Johann Sebastian Bach, his technical proficiency, unorthodox musical philosophy, and eccentric personality and piano technique. Ronald Turini (born 1934) was the personally most highly regarded student of Vladimir Horowitz and performed as soloist with major orchestras around the world. Zeyda Ruga Suzuki (born 1943, Havana, Cuba) is a Cuban-Canadian classical pianist and Juno Award nominee. Dang Thai Son (born 1958, Hanoi, Vietnam) is a classical pianist known for being the first Asian pianist to win the International Frederick Chopin Piano Competition in 1980. He remains a well-known Chopin interpreter, and now resides in Montreal, Quebec, Canada. Naida Cole (born 1974) has recorded music by Fauré, Chabrier, Satie and Ravel. Wonny Song Korean-Canadian pianist and professor. First Prize winner at the 2005 Young Concert Artists International Auditions in New York, Prix d'Europe 2003, and winner of the Minnesota Orchestra's WAMSO Competition.

- Steve Barakatt
- JJ Jun Li Bui
- Ronald Turini
- Angela Cheng
- Marc-André Hamelin
- Charles Richard-Hamelin
- Angela Hewitt
- Anton Kuerti
- Lee Kum-Sing
- Bruce Liu
- Louis Lortie
- Jan Lisiecki
- Harold Bradley (pianist)
- Jon Kimura Parker
- Christina Petrowska Quilico
- Giancarlo Scalia
- Wonny Song
- Zeyda Ruga Suzuki
- Tony Yike Yang

==== Violinists ====
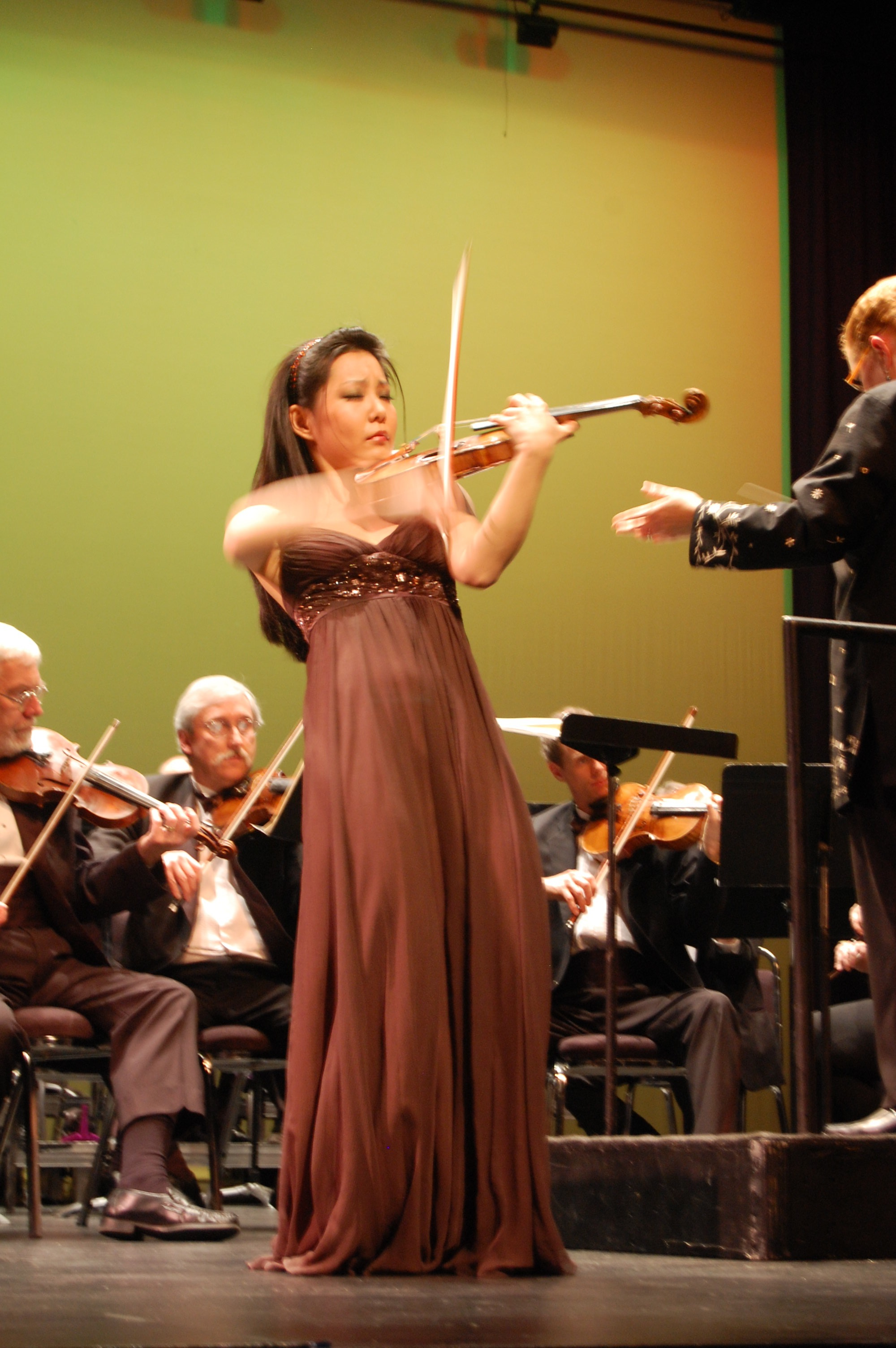
Susanne Hou

Canadian violinists:

- Martin Beaver
- Nikki Chooi
- Timothy Chooi
- Alexandre Da Costa
- Angèle Dubeau
- James Ehnes
- Moshe Hammer
- Susanne Hou
- Leila Josefowicz
- Chantal Juillet
- Juliette Kang
- Jessica Linnebach
- Catherine Manoukian
- Peter Oundjian
- Walter Prystawski
- Erika Raum
- Lara St. John
- Scott St. John
- Steven Staryk
- Harold Sumberg
- Ralitsa Tcholakova
- Robert Uchida

Non-Canadian violinists within the Canadian music community:

- Jacques Israelievitch
- Hidetaro Suzuki
- Pinchas Zukerman

==== Other instrumentalists ====
Other string players include violist Rivka Golani and cellists Donald Whitton (a founding member of NACO), Ottawa-based chamber musician Julian Armour (also a chamber music festival organizer), and soloist Ofra Harnoy. Well-known wind players include bassoonists such as William Douglas and Nadina Mackie Jackson; flautists Timothy Hutchins and Alexander Zonjic; and oboists such as James Mason and Marc Rogers. Notable Canadian organists include Eric Robertson, Gerald Bales, François Brassard, and Healey Willan. There are also several well-known Canadian organ builders, including Casavant Frères and Gabriel Kney. Two classical guitarists from Canada have become well known: Liona Boyd and Norbert Kraft. Well-known brass players from Canada include Jens Lindemann (trumpet), James Sommerville (horn) and Alain Trudel (trombone).

=== Composers ===
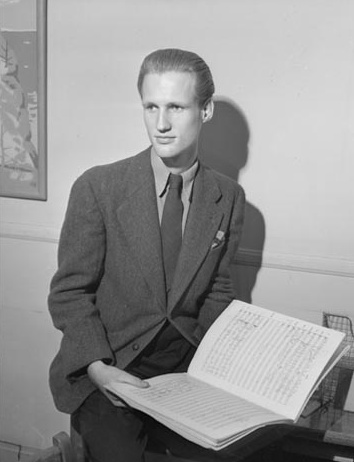
Harry Somers

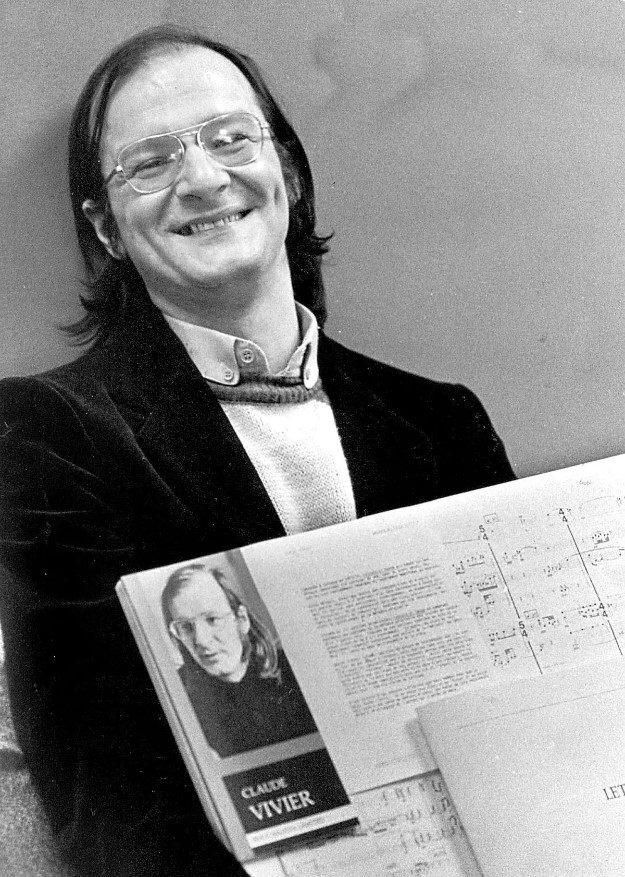
Claude Vivier

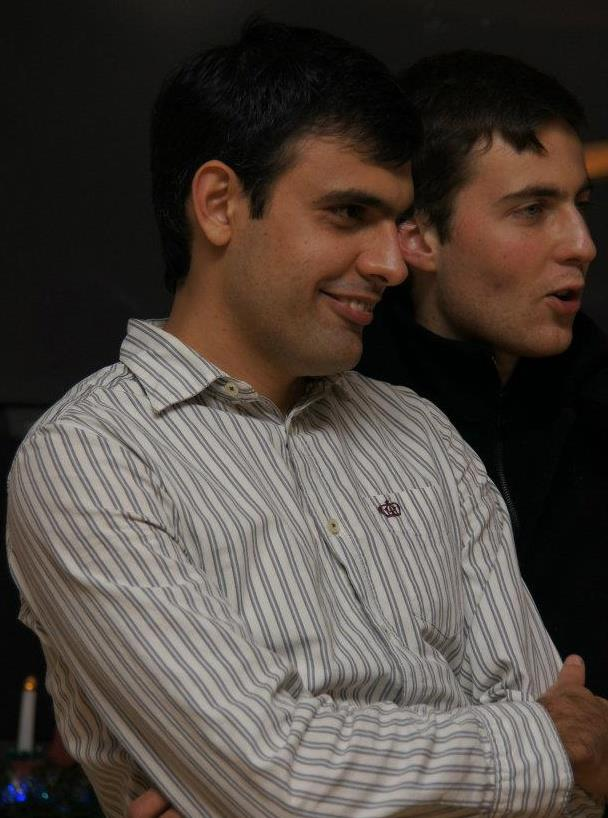
Vahram Sargsyan

- Robert Aitken
- István Anhalt
- Louis Applebaum
- Violet Archer
- Michael Conway Baker
- Steve Barakatt
- John Beckwith
- Denys Bouliane
- John Burge
- Amice Calverley
- Pat Carrabré
- Brian Cherney
- Jean Coulthard
- Eleanor Joanne Daley
- Victor Davies
- R. Nathaniel Dett
- Airat Ichmouratov
- John Estacio
- Gordon Fitzell
- Malcolm Forsyth
- André Gagnon
- Steven Gellman
- Peter Hannan
- Stephen Hatfield
- Christos Hatzis
- Jacques Hétu
- Gary Kulesha
- Rachel Laurin
- Alexina Louie
- Hummie Mann
- Bruce Mather
- Michael Matthews
- Oskar Morawetz
- Marjan Mozetich
- Owen Pallett
- Randolph Peters
- Imant Raminsh
- John Rea
- Godfrey Ridout
- John Robertson
- James Rolfe
- George Ross
- Vahram Sargsyan
- Giancarlo Scalia
- R. Murray Schafer
- Howard Shore
- Mark Sirett
- Harry Somers
- Donald Steven
- Claude Vivier
- John Weinzweig
- Healey Willan

See also:

- Association of Canadian Women Composers
- Canadian League of Composers
- Canadian Music Centre
- Canadian Music Centre – An archive of Canadian compositions.
- SOCAN – Society of Composers, Authors, and Music Publishers of Canada
- Wikipedia's List of Canadian Composers

=== Conductors ===
==== Canadian conductors ====
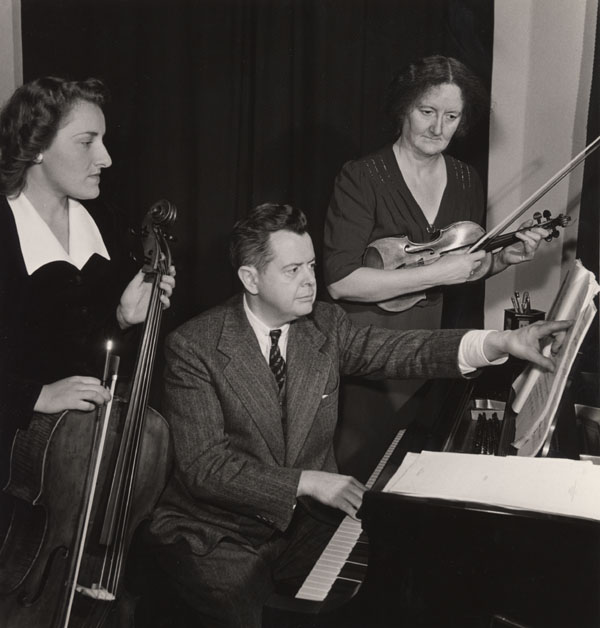
The Canadian Trio

- Raffi Armenian (Canadian Chamber Ensemble)
- Mario Bernardi (Canadian Opera Company, National Arts Centre Orchestra, Calgary Philharmonic, CBC Radio Orchestra)
- Boris Brott (National Academy Orchestra, McGill Chamber Orchestra, Hamilton Philharmonic Orchestra)
- Bernard Labadie (Les Violons du Roy and La Chapelle de Québec)
- Martin MacDonald (National Academy Orchestra)
- Sir Ernest MacMillan (Toronto Symphony Orchestra( TSO))
- Yannick Nézet-Séguin (Orchestre Métropolitain du Grand Montréal)
- Peter Oundjian (Toronto Symphony Orchestra( TSO))
- Ivars Taurins (Tafelmusik Chamber Choir)
- David Fallis (Opera Atelier, Tafelmusik Baroque Orchestra, Toronto Consort, Toronto Chamber Choir)
- Wilfrid Pelletier (Montreal Symphony Orchestra), (Quebec Symphony Orchestra), (Metropolitan Opera)
- Doreen Rao (MacMillan Singers, Bach Festival Singers; Elmer Iseler Chair in Conducting, University of Toronto)
- Rosemary Thomson (Calgary Philharmonic, Canadian Opera Company)
- Tyrone Paterson (Manitoba Opera, Opera Lyra Ottawa)
- Dr Lisette Canton (the Ottawa Bach Choir)
- Timothy Vernon (Pacific Opera Victoria)

==== Conductors of other nationalities ====
- Kazuyoshi Akiyama (Vancouver Symphony Orchestra)
- Karel Ančerl (Toronto Symphony Orchestra)
- Sergiu Comissiona (Vancouver Symphony Orchestra)
- Sir Andrew Davis (Toronto Symphony Orchestra)
- Pierre Dervaux (Orchestre Symphonique de Québec)
- Charles Dutoit (Montreal Symphony Orchestra)
- William Eddins (Edmonton Symphony Orchestra)
- John Eliot Gardiner (CBC Radio Orchestra)
- Gunther Herbig (Toronto Symphony Orchestra)
- Otto Klemperer (Montreal Symphony Orchestra)
- Luigi von Kunits (New Symphony Orchestra, precursor of the Toronto Symphony Orchestra)
- Zubin Mehta (Montreal Symphony Orchestra)
- Alexander Mickelthwate (Winnipeg Symphony Orchestra)
- Kent Nagano (Orchestre Symphonique de Montréal)
- Seiji Ozawa (Toronto Symphony Orchestra)
- Trevor Pinnock (National Arts Centre Orchestra)
- Jukka-Pekka Saraste (Toronto Symphony Orchestra)
- Alex Prior (Edmonton Symphony Orchestra)
- Walter Susskind (Toronto Symphony Orchestra)
- Bramwell Tovey (Vancouver Symphony Orchestra)
- Pinchas Zukerman (National Arts Centre Orchestra)
- Christian Kluxen (Victoria Symphony Orchestra)
- Kees Bakels (Victoria Symphony Orchestra)
- Gemma New (Hamilton Philharmonic Orchestra)

== Recording, broadcasting, and publishing ==
=== Radio stations ===
Radio broadcasting of classical music in Canada is extremely limited. Historically, the primary source of classical music on Canadian radio was the national CBC Radio 2 network, however that network has greatly reduced its classical music programming in favor of Canadian popular music programming, with mainly "accessible" classical music available only five hours a day in the middle of the day.

There are three commercial radio stations in Canada offering a classical music format:

- CFMZ 96.3 FM, Toronto/103.1 FM, Cobourg
- CJPX 99.5 FM, Montreal
- CKCL Classic 107 FM Winnipeg

The community CKUA radio network in Alberta and CFMU in Ontario also airs some classical music programming, as do some campus radio and community radio stations. All radio stations in Canada are required by the Canadian Radio-television and Telecommunications Commission (CRTC) to meet Canadian content targets. For classical music stations, the requirement is 20% Canadian content.

=== Music publications ===
- La Scena Musicale magazine (Montreal)
- Musical Toronto magazine (Toronto)
- The Wholenote magazine (Toronto)
- Opera Canada magazine
- Musicworks magazine

== Schools, venues, and awards ==
=== Music schools ===
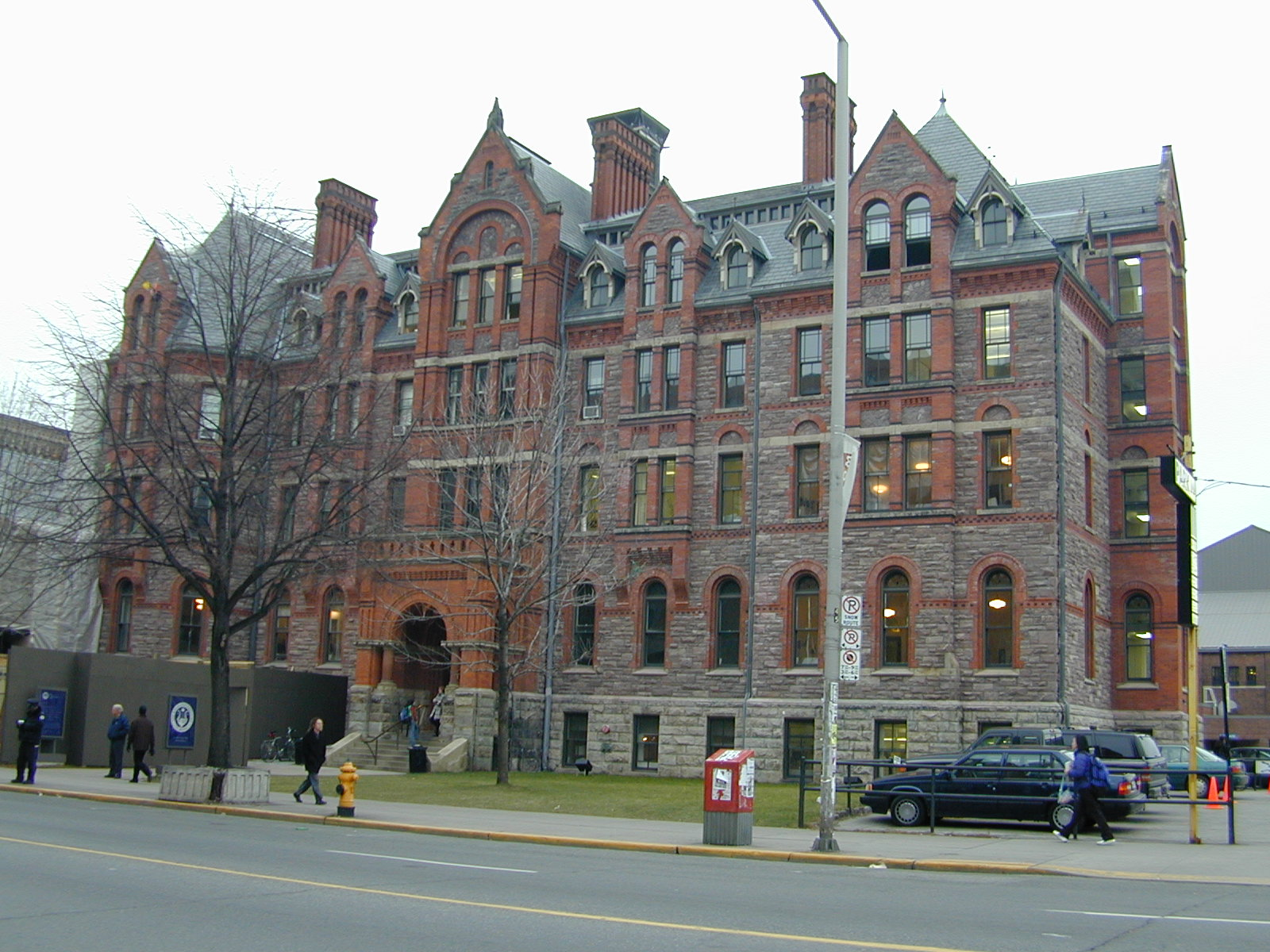
The Royal Conservatory of Music in Toronto.

Most major Canadian universities offer some type of instruction in Classical music in Bachelor of Music programs of BA (Music) programs, either in a practical sense via training in instrumental or vocal performance or conducting, or in a theoretical or academic sense through the study of Classical music harmonic theory or history. Some universities in Canada also offer graduate degrees in music, such as the Master of Music (in instrumental or vocal performance), the Master of Arts in theory or musicology, or more rarely, through the PhD in music theory or musicology.

The Royal Conservatory of Music (Canada) in Toronto offers a comprehensive teaching method encompassing strict guidelines for ten grade levels. The ARCT and LRCT diplomas for Teachers or Performers is the culmination of all the grades which is also recognized worldwide. Comprehensive theory and history co-requisites are required to obtain a certificate. Many Canadian provinces recognize completion of higher levels of the curriculum, awarding students high school credits upon successful completion. The Royal Conservatory operates The Glenn Gould School, a centre for professional training in classical music performance, a Community School, an educational initiative for public school teachers, a Young Artists Performance Academy, and it offers RCM Examinations. Some of Canada's most famous musicians studied at the Conservatory. Glenn Gould studied theory, organ and piano, graduating at age 12 in 1946 with an ARCT diploma, with highest honours. Teresa Stratas, Lois Marshall and Jon Vickers were also Conservatory students.

The Schulich School of Music at McGill University in Montreal offers performance programs at McGill provide students with private lessons and performing opportunities in university ensembles, in addition to studies in the history and theory of music. The school also offers a three-year diploma of Licentiate in Music, an Artist Diploma program, and an Orchestral Training Program. McGill's Music Research Department offers B.Mus. programs in Composition, Theory, History, Music Education, Sound Recording, and Music Technology. The school has been ranked by The Princeton Review as among the top ten music schools in the world.

=== Music venues ===
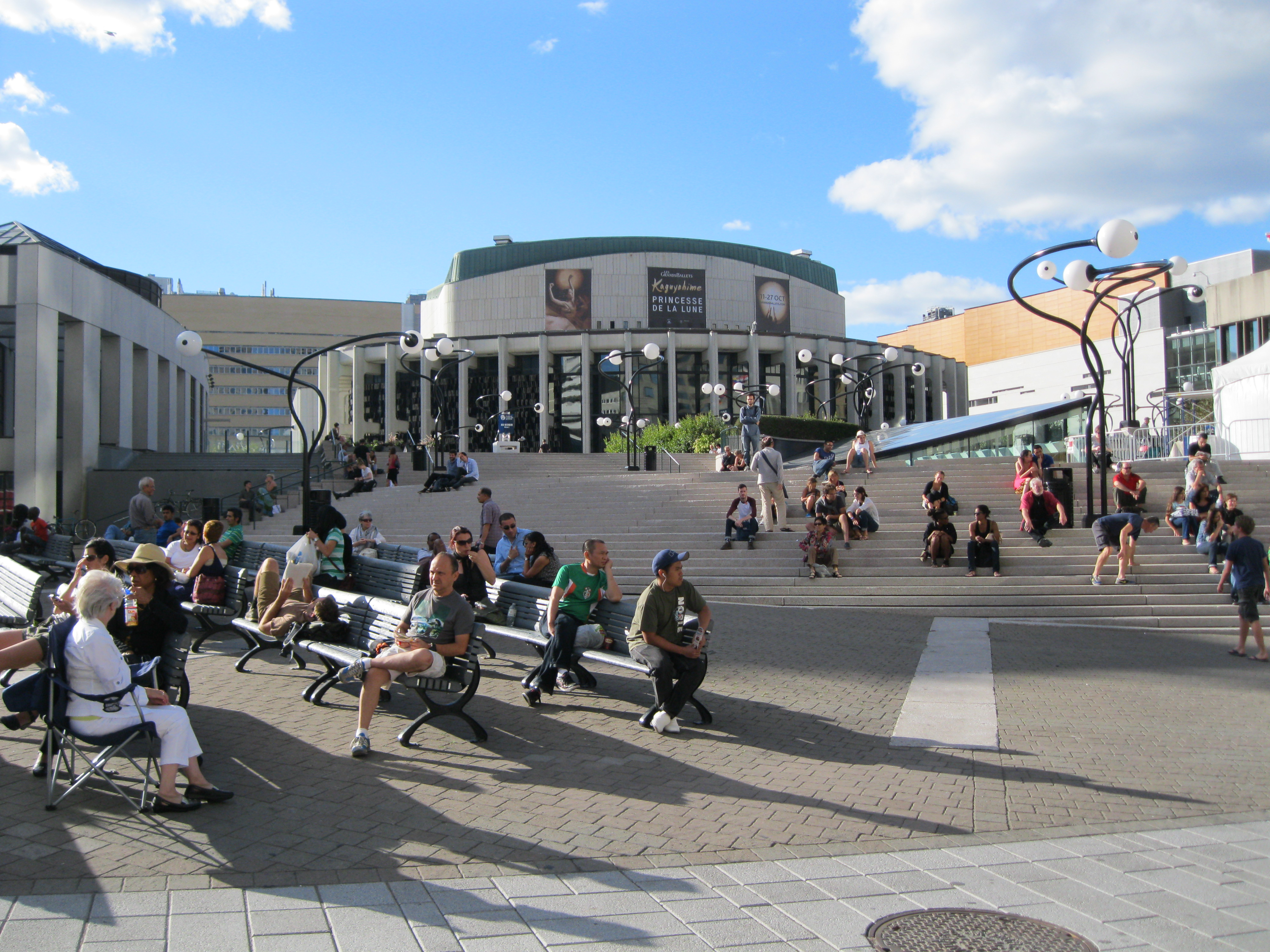
The Place des Arts in Montreal.

Concert halls with resident performing groups:

- Place des Arts (Montreal)
- Montreal Symphony House (Montreal)
- Lambda School of Music and Fine Arts (Montreal)
- Francis Winspear Centre for Music (Edmonton)
- Jack Singer Concert Hall (Calgary Centre for Performing Arts)
- Centennial Concert Hall (Winnipeg)
- National Arts Centre (Ottawa)
- Sony Centre for the Arts (Toronto)
- Four Seasons Centre (Toronto)
- Roy Thomson Hall (Toronto)
- Massey Hall (Toronto)
- Koerner Hall (Toronto)
- Toronto Centre for the Arts (Toronto)
- Living Arts Centre (Mississauga)
- Queen Elizabeth Theatre (Vancouver)
- Rebecca Cohn Auditorium (Halifax)
- Rose Theatre (Brampton)

=== Awards and competitions ===
- Glenn Gould Prize
- Banff International String Quartet Competition
- Montreal International Music Competition/Concours international de musique de Montréal
- Eckhardt-Gramatté National Music Competition for the Performance of Canadian Music/Concours national de musique Eckhardt-Gramatté
- Lynnwood Farnam Organ Competition (formerly, the John Robb Organ Competition)
- Kiwanis Music Festival
- Opera Canada Awards (The Rubbies)
- The Montreal International Classical Guitar Festival and Competition
- Juno Awards
- Canadian Music Competition
- Standard Life Competition, Orchestre Symphonique de Montréal

== Financing ==
Arts organizations in Canada are usually expected to raise 50% of their funding through ticket sales and/or fundraising campaigns that they organize and execute themselves. Another 25% is traditionally covered by corporate sponsorship. The remaining 25% is typically provided by three separate levels of government: federal, provincial and municipal. Canadian arts organizations are constantly lobbying all three levels of government for a more prominent place in their budgets and must therefore compete with other public concerns such as health care and education.

== See also ==
- André Gagnon
- Jorane
- Lambda School of Music and Fine Arts
- Domaine Forget
- Music of Canada
