= Lambda School of Music and Fine Arts =

Coordinates: 45°30′28.0″N 73°49′12.7″W

- Lambda School of Music and Fine Arts
- 4989 Boul des Sources, Pierrefonds-Roxboro, Quebec, H8Y3E3; Canada

Information
- Type: Performing Arts, music, fine arts school
- Motto: Learning about life through the Arts
- Established: 2008
- Colours: Burgundy and Beige
- Mascot: 1 Brown and 4 White Lions
- Nickname: Lambda School / Ecole Lambda
- Affiliation: Royal Conservatory of Music, Toronto
- Website: https://www.lambdaonlinemusicschool.com

Lambda School of Music and Fine Arts is a bilingual school of music and fine arts and a venue for performances located in Pierrefonds-Roxboro in the West Island of Montreal, Quebec, Canada. The languages of instruction are in English and French. Lambda was inaugurated on 10 October 2008 by the mayoress of Pierrefonds-Roxboro, Madame Monique Worth and appointed representatives from the Chinese Embassy, Ottawa. The name Lambda was specifically chosen for a variety of reasons. In physics, the sign Lambda (uppercase Λ, lowercase λ) stands for wavelength. Through the wavelength of sounds, humans communicate through music. Through the wavelength of light, we communicate emotions through various colors in painting. Lambda is also the acronym for Learning of the Arts through the Mind and Body in the Discovery of Aesthetics. Lambda School supports other organizations of the arts and education in Quebec. The school has been a sponsor of scholarships for the Montreal Classical Music Festival organized annually by the Quebec Music Teachers' Association as well as the Lakeshore Chamber Music Society, and the Quebec Music Competition while also offering an array of scholarships and bursaries to deserving students of the arts. To encourage the development of high level performance in young musicians and to promote the spirit of transcending one's artistic boundaries Lambda School also supports the Quebec Music Competition, an annual music competition organized by the Concours International de Musique et des Beaux Arts de Quebec, offering various scholarships, prizes, certificates and perpetual trophies, and performance opportunities for winners. Lambda school also offers free programs to the community and senior citizens. It is also the official examination centre for RCM Examinations of practice and theoretical subjects in the West Island of Montreal since January 2011. In 2015, Lambda has also set up an auxiliary school in Shanghai, China. Starting from 2023, Lambda School of Music and Fine Arts has changed its name to Lambda International School of Music (Online) and offers exclusively online music lessons.

== Curriculum ==
The school provides a comprehensive education to learners of all ages and levels. Founded and conceived as a school of interdisciplinary learning of the arts with the intent of helping learners discover their artistic niche, it offers a variety of artistic disciplines. Subjects offered include music, musical theatre, dance, painting, photography and videography. Lambda is headed by a panel of academic advisors that includes university professors, experts, and researchers in education and psychology, as well as a team of artists-in-residence. Lambda offers artistic education from the beginners' level to concert artist level. Without a pre-auditioning process, students who are dedicated yet have not attained a significant level of accomplishment at an early age are able to receive artistic education from international concert artists to reach their full artistic potential.

Artists-in-residence at Lambda School include international renowned concert artists. Lambda's faculty consists of concert artists including graduates from prestigious institutions such as the Juilliard School of Music, Manhattan School of Music, Eastman School of Music, Curtis Institute of Music, University of Montreal, McGill University, The Glenn Gould School and other major universities and conservatories. In 2015, Lambda also set up a special interdisciplinary exploratory program, with the purpose of introducing young learners to music, arts, science and technology through an integrated and hands-on experience.

Besides regular training programs in music and fine arts, Lambda School also offers a fast-track program to young students who wish to pursuit a musical career from an early age. Many outstanding performers have emerged from this fast-track program. Lambda also offers an intense summer day camp for Canadian as well as international students who wish to perfect their musical skills in piano and strings.

Lambda School of Music and Fine Arts started its division of online music instruction as a result of COVID-19.

== Student and alumni achievements ==
Lambda School has consistently groomed a significant number of musical prodigies. A large number of music students of Lambda have been awarded major prizes in national and international competitions. Performances by Lambda students have also been featured on PBS Mountain Lake television, Global TV, CBC Radio Canada and Breakfast TV. Many students from Lambda won first prizes at the Canadian Music Competition (CMC), Canadian International Music Competition (CIMC), Crescendo International Competition, the Elite International Competition, Golden Classical Music Award Competition, the Grand Prize Virtuoso International Competition, the Quebec Music Competition, The Grand Maestro International Music Competition, The Trinity International Music Competition (Online), The Shanghai International Music Competition, and The Concours de Musique de la Capitale. Students have been invited to perform at the Royal Albert Hall in London, Der Musikverein in Vienna, Parco della Musica in Italy (Rome) as well as Carnegie Hall in New York numerous times, as well as major concert halls in Amsterdam, Brussels, Luxumberg, China, and other countries.

Students from the music performance program of Lambda School have been accepted into the Bachelor's program in music performance of major prestigious university in North America, including the New England Conservatory of Music, Peabody Institute of Music, Manhattan School of Music, Cleveland Institute of Music in the United States, as well as McGill University (in Montreal, Canada).

Young students from Lambda School of Music and Fine Arts are regular winners of the Canadian Music Competition (a.k.a. C.M.C), as well as the CBC Virtuose (a new television program by CBC) hosted by Gregory Charles. Alumni including Emily Oulousian and Diane Liu both won the 2016 and 2017 edition of the Virtuose Competition. Young students are also regular Gold Medal winners in examinations offered by the Royal Conservatory of Music (in both practical and theory examinations). In 2016, young piano students from Lambda, aged from as young as 6 to 18 years old also performed Camille Saint-Saens' Carnaval of the Animals with the Orford Orchestra under the baton of Maestro Jean-Francois Rivest. Piano students of Lambda School have also taken masterclasses with concert pianist Alfred Brendel at McGill University.

The school takes an innovative approach to musical and artistic education. It regularly presents masterclass series by artist teachers to promote a high standard of musical performance for students in the Montreal community. Lambda also hosts monthly pedagogical workshops presented by clinicians on performance-related topics to encourage discussion amongst members of the pedagogical community on topics including: performance practice, the circumvention of performance interferences and blocks, maximizing potential in the gifted music student, the effective use the body during practice and performance, and performance injury prevention through the Alexander Technique, and the Feldenkrais Method in collaboration with the Alan Fraser Institute.

Lambda School of Music and Fine Arts also emphasizes on the importance of social responsibility towards the community. Students are encouraged from a young age to share their passion of music and make use of their performance skills to give back to society. Students frequently perform for senior homes, as well as organize fund raising concerts for the Montreal Children's Hospital, Leukemia and Lymphoma Society of Canada, Montreal Chinese Hospital, and other charitable foundations and organizations. In 2015, music students of Lambda School of Music and Fine Arts in collaboration with other musicians and artists have succeeded in raising close to $1.7 million for the Leukemia and Lymphoma Society of Canada in the Light the Night Walk. In January 2020, students of Lambda School also raised funds for the victims in the Bushfires in Australia. Lambda School of Music and Fine Arts also collaborated in hosting the Quebec Music Competition in 2017 and 2018.

== See also ==
- Wonny Song
- Alexandre Da Costa
- Music of Canada
