= Ariana Hilborn =

Latvian long-distance runner

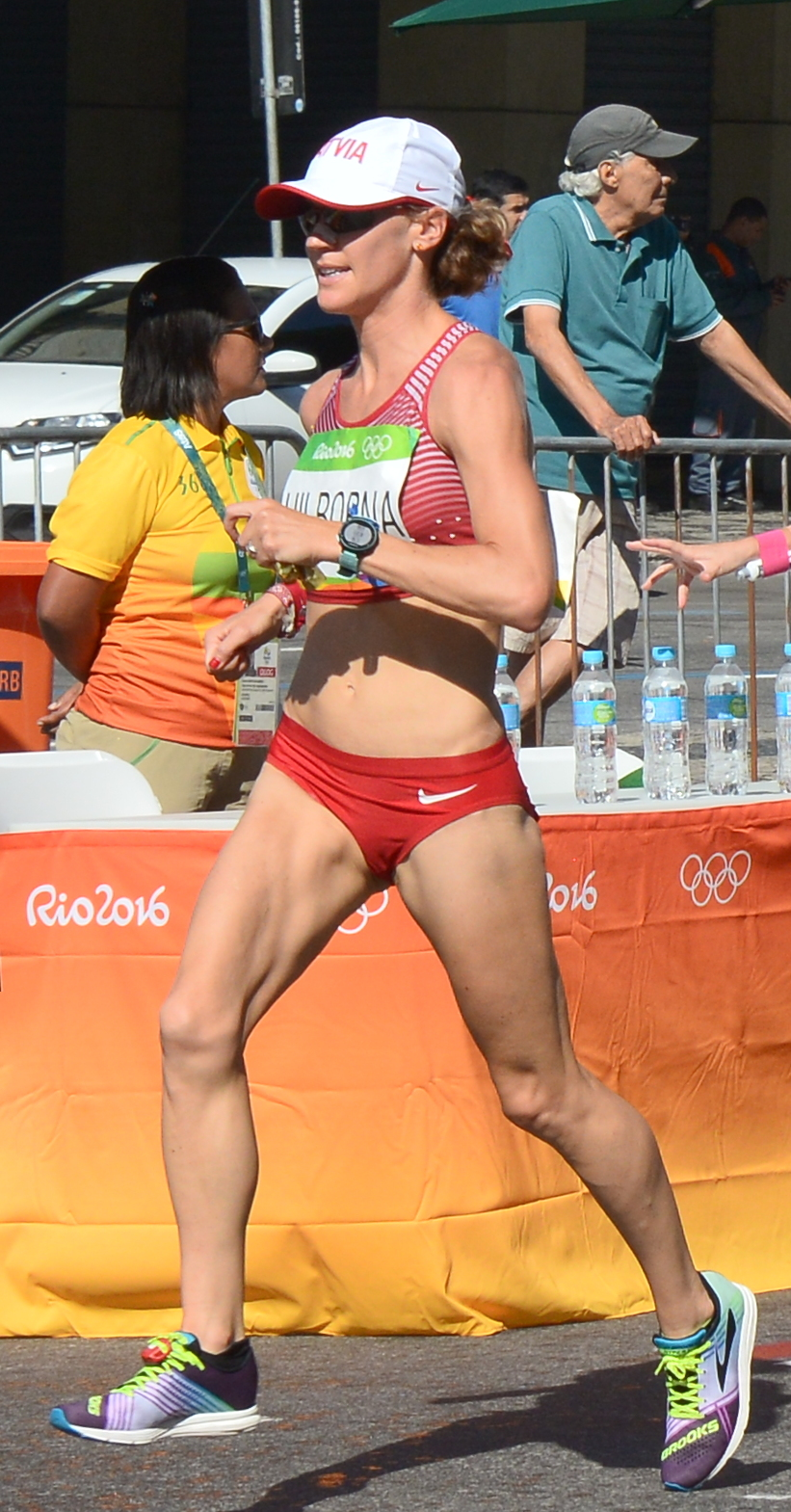
- Hilborn at the 2016 Olympics

Personal information
- Native name: Ariana Hilborna
- Full name: Ariana Kira Hilborn
- Nationality: Latvia
- Born: Ariana Kira Zvērs; 19 September 1980 (age 45) Greendale, Wisconsin, U.S.
- Education: Arizona State University
- Height: 167 cm (5 ft 6 in)
- Weight: 52 kg (115 lb)

Sport
- Sport: Athletics
- Events: Marathon, half marathon
- Club: Sonoran Distance Project
- Coached by: John Reich

Achievements and titles
- Personal bests: HM – 1:14.22 (2014); Marathon – 2:35.21 (2014).

Ariana Kira Hilborn (née Zvērs, Latvian: Ariana Hilborna, born 19 September 1980) is a US-born Latvian long-distance runner. She was born on 19 September 1980 in Greendale, Wisconsin, United States. All of her four grandparents were Latvians, who left Latvia at the end of World War II as refugees, and later emigrated to the U.S. In 2014 Ariana Hilborn gained dual US-Latvian citizenship.

Hilborn disliked running in her teens and started training aged 23 to stay in shape.

Ariana Hart ran 4:36:58 with her eventual husband in her first road race at 2008 PF Chang's Rock 'n' Roll Arizona Marathon through Team In Training program.

In December 2009, she ran her first sub 3-hour marathon after training with Arizona Road Racers and improving her weekly mileage to 70 miles per week.

At 2010 Chicago Marathon, she missed the US Olympic Marathon Trials Qualifier, but made it 3 months later at 2011 PF Chang's Rock 'n' Roll Arizona Marathon in 2:45:37. At 2011 Grandma's Marathon on 18 June, Hilborn was the 10th woman to finish in a personal best 2:37:28. Her story—and her finish photo—were inspiring enough for her image to be used in the following year's marketing campaign for the famed race from Two Harbors to Duluth.

She attended the 2012 U.S. Olympic trials for the 2012 Summer Olympics marathon competition, and with the time 2:37.37 she ranked 29th. At 2012 Grandma's Marathon on 16 June, Hilborn was the 6th woman to finish 2:40:08.

In 2013, Ariana Hilborn moved to Michigan and trained for 2013 Boston Marathon with Hansons-Brooks Distance Project and placed 22nd in 2:42:00.

In summer 2014 She trained in Flagstaff, Arizona running 110 – 125 miles per week. Hilborn placed fourth in 2:35:20 at 2014 USA Marathon Championships and placed second at the Riga Marathon with a time of 2:40.22.

IAAF transfer to Latvia approved in 2015.

Her result (2:40.32) at the Ottawa Marathon on 29 May 2016 ranked her third among Latvian runners and secured a ticket to the 2016 Summer Olympics. Hilborn finished 106th in 2:50:51 at Athletics at the 2016 Summer Olympics – Women's marathon.
