= Fi-index =

Bibliometric index

The Fi-index (or Fiorillo index, from the Greek letter φ, phi) is a bibliometric index introduced in 2022 by Italian researcher Luca Fiorillo, published in Publishing Research Quarterly (Springer). The index was designed to assess the extent to which an author's h-index has been influenced by self-citations.

== Background ==
The h-index, proposed by Jorge E. Hirsch in 2005, is one of the most widely used bibliometric indicators for evaluating the productivity and scientific impact of researchers. However, the h-index has several well-documented limitations, including its inability to distinguish between citations received from third parties and self-citations, which can allow manipulation of the index value through strategic self-citation practices.

Over the years, numerous corrective or complementary indices to the h-index have been proposed, including the g-index, the a-index, r-index, and ar-index, the h(2)-index, the b-index for self-citation exclusion, and the q-index for detecting strategic self-citation placement. The Fi-index differs from previous approaches in that it does not merely remove self-citations but quantifies the effect of self-citations on the h-index.

== Formula ==
The Fi-index is calculated using the following formula:

$$\text{Fi-index} = h\text{-index} - \left[\frac{(100 - \%\text{selfcit})}{100} \times h\text{-index}\right]$$

where:

- $h\text{-index}$ is the author's Hirsch index;
- $\%\text{selfcit}$ is the percentage of self-citations out of total citations.

The percentage of self-citations is obtained as:

$$\%\text{selfcit} = 100 - \frac{\text{citations without self-citations}}{k}$$

with $k = \frac{\text{total citations}}{100}$.

The resulting value can range between 0 and the author's h-index value. A value of 0 indicates that self-citations have not influenced the h-index, while higher values indicate a greater influence of self-citations on the bibliometric parameter.

== Subsequent developments ==
=== Fi-index tool ===
In 2022, the same author proposed an extension called the Fi-index tool, also published in Publishing Research Quarterly, to apply the method not to an author's entire career but to a single manuscript during the publication process. The Fi-index tool score for a given manuscript is obtained by calculating the difference between the author's Fi-index before and after the presumed publication of the article. This variant was designed to provide certification of the quality of a manuscript's reference list with respect to self-citations.

The tool provides an interpretive scale:

- 0: reference list free of self-citations;
- < 1: normal self-citing;
- 1–2: moderate self-citing;
- > 2: h-index variations and aggressive self-citing.

=== Fi-score ===
In 2024, the Fi-score was proposed as a further development, published in Publishing Research Quarterly, with a simplified formula:

$$\text{Fi-score} = \frac{h\text{-index}^2}{\text{total citations}} \times 100$$

The Fi-score evaluates the reliability of citation counts independently of self-citations, by comparing the ratio of the squared h-index to the total number of citations. The index was calculated on a sample of 194,983 researchers drawn from the database of the world's top 2% scientists published by Stanford University. Results indicate a mean Fi-score value of 25.03 with a standard deviation of 6.85; the maximum admissible value was set at approximately 32 (mean + one standard deviation).

== Reception and applications ==
=== Discussion in the scientific community ===
The index has been the subject of analysis and discussion in the international academic community. Mechanician Michele Ciavarella analysed the Fi-score on iMechanica, an academic portal affiliated with the Harvard School of Engineering and Applied Sciences, highlighting the correlation between high Fi-score values and high self-citation percentages, as well as the compatibility of the results with the Stanford–Ioannidis ranking. Ciavarella further observed that the Fi-score constitutes a quick tool for identifying anomalous bibliometric profiles, regardless of discipline, with a calculation far simpler than the multidimensional composite indicator of the Stanford database.

=== Convergence with the work of Ioannidis (Stanford) ===
In June 2024, Evdaimon, Ioannidis et al. proposed, as part of a large-scale study on citation orchestration conducted with Scopus data, a set of metrics to detect citation manipulation patterns. Among the indicators presented, the authors adopted the ratio of total citations to the square of the h-index — corresponding to the inverse of the Fi-score introduced by Fiorillo two years earlier — as a marker of possible small-scale orchestration. The independent convergence toward a mathematically equivalent indicator was noted by Ciavarella on iMechanica, who observed that the Stanford group proposed, subsequently to Fiorillo, an index substantially analogous to the inverse of the Fi-score.

=== Empirical applications ===
The Fi-index has been applied empirically by independent researchers. A 2025 study by Saputri Nur et al., published in Khizanah al-Hikmah: Jurnal Ilmu Perpustakaan, Informasi, dan Kearsipan, employed the method to analyse the self-citation practices of the ten most productive lecturers at Halu Oleo University in Indonesia, concluding that the Fi-index values fell within normal limits for all subjects examined.

The Fi-score has also been cited in the broader context of anomalous citation detection research. Ebadulla et al. (2025) referenced the Fi-score in a study on detecting anomalous self-citations using citation network analysis and large language models, published as a Springer book chapter.

== Limitations ==
The index has several limitations acknowledged in the literature:

- For authors with very low citation and publication counts (e.g., a single article cited once), the formula produces mathematically extreme values that are not meaningful;
- The calculation for manuscripts with many authors requires individual analysis of each co-author, making it more complex;
- The index does not detect reciprocal citation practices between different authors that do not constitute self-citation in the strict sense;
- The Fi-score can vary significantly across disciplines with different citation conventions;
- The applicability of the index depends on the availability and consistency of data in the bibliometric databases used (Scopus, Web of Science, Google Scholar);
- Ciavarella suggested that the index should not be applied except for statistical or preliminary studies, to be supplemented with in-depth qualitative assessments of suspected cases.

== See also ==
- h-index
- Bibliometrics
- Self-citation
- Impact factor
- Scientometrics
- Citation impact
