= Wonny Song =

Canadian pianist

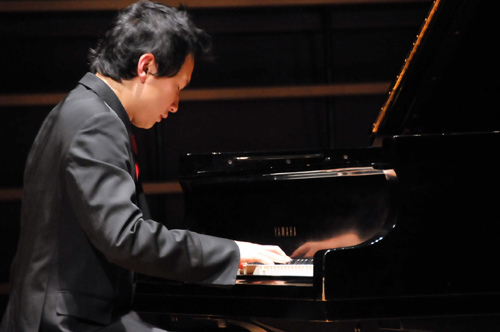

Background information
- Origin: Seoul, South Korea
- Genres: Classical
- Occupations: Musician, Art director
- Instrument: Piano

- Wonny Song
- Hangul: 송원호
- RR: Song Wonho
- MR: Song Wŏnho

Wonny Song (born 1978) is a Canadian pianist.

== Biography ==
Song was born in South Korea and grew up in Montreal. He began piano studies at the age of eight and received a full scholarship to Philadelphia's Curtis Institute of Music in 1994. He earned a bachelor's degree from Montreal University in 1998 and continued his studies with Anton Kuerti at the University of Toronto and at The Glenn Gould School with Marc Durand. He completed his doctoral studies at the University of Minnesota in 2004, studying with Lydia Artymiw. He has also studied with Leon Fleisher, Jorge Chaminé and Marie-Francoise Bucquet. He has performed as a soloist with the Cincinnati Symphony, the Peoria Symphony Orchestra, the Montreal Symphony Orchestra, the Toronto Symphony Orchestra, the National Arts Centre Orchestra and the EuroAsian Philharmonic Orchestra in Korea and Thailand.

Song was director and director of artists-in-residence project of Lambda School of Music and Fine Arts in Montreal from 2008 to 2020. Wonny Song has been appointed artistic director of Orford Music (formerly the Orford Arts Centre) in May 2015. Mr. Song officially assumed his position at the beginning of summer 2015, at which time he began to prepare the 2016 program.

== Awards and recognitions ==
- 1994 – Gold Medal at the World Piano Competition, Cincinnati.
- 1995 – First Prize and Best Artistic Interpretation Prize at the Montreal Symphony Piano Competition.
- 1997 – Ludmila Knezkova Piano Competition, Nova Scotia.
- 2000 – First Elinor Bell Fellowship, University of Minnesota.
- 2001 – First and Grand Prize winner of the Minnesota Orchestra's WAMSO Competition.
- 2002 – Galaxy Rising Stars Award, Ottawa.
- 2003 – Prix d'Europe, Canada.
- 2010 – Young Canadian Musicians Award.
- Claire Tow Prize.
- Miriam Brody Aronson Prize.
- Fergus Orchestra Soloist Prize.
- Washington Performing Arts Society Prize.
- Saint Vincent College Concert Series Prize.

== Discography ==
MUSSORGKSY: Pictures at an Exhibition

- Released: 26 February 2007
- Format: Audio CD
- Label: XXI-21 Productions Inc

CLAIR DE LUNE. Les grands classiques d'Edgar

- Released: 3 February 2009
- Format: Audio CD
- Label: Disques Octave Classique Inc

LES GRANDS CLASSIQUES D'EDGAR. La musique romantique

- Released: 3 February 2009
- Format: Audio CD
- Label: Disques Octave Classique Inc

LUDWIG VAN BEETHOVEN: Piano Sonatas Op.2, No.2 & Op.10, No.2

- Released: 2 June 2009
- Format: Audio CD
- Label: XXI-21 Productions Inc

FRANCIS POULENC: Histoire de Babar & la boite à joujoux

- Released: October 2010
- Format: Audio CD
- Label: Disques Octave Classique Inc

STORIES (Limited Edition)

- Released: April 2011
- Format: Audio CD
- Label: Samon Promotion Inc. Japan

FRANZ LISZT: Christmas Tree

- Released: October 2013
- Format: Audio CD
- Label: Universal Music Canada

CARL CZERNY: A Rediscovery Genius (Wonny Song/various other artists)

- Released: April 2014
- Format: 3 Audio CD Set
- Label: Doremi Records

Doux moments pour Philou (Wonny Song/various other artists)

- Released: June 2016
- Format: CD, Compilation, Gatefold Sleeve
- Label: Justin Time – JTR 8600-2

== See also ==
- Pianists
- Canadian classical music
- Young Concert Artists
- Lambda School of Music and Fine Arts
