= Marshall A. Lichtman =

American hematologist

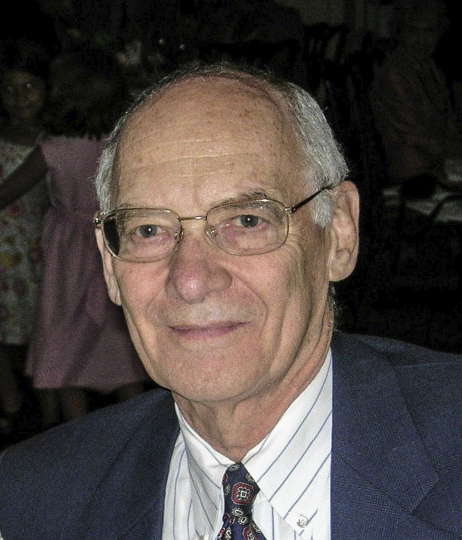
- Born: June 23, 1934 (age 92); New York, New York
- Education: Cornell University BA 1955 University of Buffalo School of Medicine 1960
- Spouse: Alice Jo (Maisel) Lichtman
- Children: 3

Marshall A. Lichtman is an American hematologist whose career was spent at the University of Rochester School of Medicine and Dentistry. Over the span of his 60-year career, Doctor Lichtman served as Chief Resident, Chief of Hematology, Dean of Academic Affairs and Research, Dean of the University of Rochester School of Medicine and Dentistry, and Professor Emeritus.

== Career ==
Lichtman performed his residency from 1960 to 1963 at the University of Rochester School of Medicine and Dentistry in Rochester, NY. Because the draft for the Vietnam War was in effect, he was required to spend two years in the United States Public Health Service. He was assigned to the University of North Carolina at Chapel Hill School of Public Health. Upon completing his service, Lichtman returned to the University of Rochester as Chief Resident. During this time, Lichtman received grants from the National Institutes of Health, The Leukemia Society, and the National Cancer Institute to pursue his research. In addition to his research, Lichtman was at the time caring for patients, teaching students, and residents.

In 1975, Lichtman was named Chief of Hematology, and in 1979, he was appointed Dean of Academic Affairs and Research, a position he held until 1989. In 1989, Lichtman was named the President of the American Society of Hematology. In January of 1990, Lichtman was named Dean of the University of Rochester School of Medicine and Dentistry. Lichtman served as Dean until the end of 1995. During his tenure as Dean, Lichtman was appointed to the American Red Cross Board of Governors. In addition, New York Governor Mario Cuomo appointed Lichtman to the New York Council for Graduate Medical Education in 1991. In 1996, he was named Executive Vice President of the Leukemia and Lymphoma Society and served until 2007. Lichtman was appointed to the Board of Trustees of the State University of New York by Governor David Patterson in 2010 and served until 2018.

Lichtman dedicated his career to the care of patients with hematologic disorders, particularly leukemia and lymphoma. In addition to his clinical practice, he conducted extensive research, published hundreds of papers and books, and educated many medical students and residents.

== Education ==
Lichtman attended Cornell University (1951-55) and graduated with a Bachelor of Arts in Zoology. He obtained his MD from the University of Buffalo School of Medicine in 1960.

== Awards ==
Throughout his career, Lichtman received 18 awards over 60 years for his extensive work and contributions to the field of medicine. His first award was in 1957, when he was just 23 years old and his most recent award, the Wallace H. Coulter Award for Lifetime Achievement in Hematology, was awarded in 2017 at the age of 83.

The full list of awards is available on the University of Rochester website.

== Publications ==
In his career, Lichtman published more than 200 journal articles and almost 200 books. He served on the editorial boards of nine scientific publications and was editor of the journal Blood Cells, Molecules, and Diseases for 13 years. He was the editor of three monographs and five hematology textbooks, including Williams Hematology, a leading textbook in the field. He was enlisted as an editor for his expertise in white blood cells, stem cell biology, and leukemias and lymphomas. During his time as editor of Williams Hematology, Lichtman typically wrote 10-12 chapters of the book. Lichtman was the editor of Williams Hematology for 42 years.

The full list of publications (journal articles and books) is available on the University of Rochester website.
