= National Institutional Ranking Framework =

Methodology adopted to rank institutions of higher education in India

- Logo
- Categories: Higher education
- Frequency: Annually
- Circulation: All over India
- Publisher: Ministry of Education (Govt of India)
- First issue: 2016; 10 years ago
- Country: India
- Based in: New Delhi
- Language: English
- Website: nirfindia.org

National Institutional Ranking Framework (NIRF) is a ranking methodology released annually by the Ministry of Education, Government of India, to rank institutions of higher education in India. The framework was approved by the former Ministry of Human Resource Development (now the Ministry of Education) and launched by the Minister on 29 September 2015.

Depending on their areas of operation, institutions have been ranked under 11 different categories – overall, university, colleges, engineering, management, pharmacy, law, medical, architecture, dental and research. The Framework uses several parameters for ranking purposes like resources, research, and stakeholder perception. These parameters have been grouped into five clusters and these clusters were assigned certain weights. These weights depend on the type of institution. About 3500 institutions voluntarily participated in the first round of rankings.

== Background ==
The 2017 rankings were released by MHRD on 3 April 2017. While in its first rankings released in 2016, NIRF had four categories (Universities, Engineering, Management and Pharmacy), in 2017, two more categories namely, Overall and College, were added. Around 3,000 institutions participated in the rankings.

On 3 April 2018, the 2018 NIRF rankings were released with an increased number of participating institutions over the previous year.

The 2019 NIRF ranking was released on 8 April 2019 in 9 categories: Overall, Universities, Engineering, Colleges, Management, Pharmacy, Medical, Architecture, and Law.

For the 2020 rankings, around 3,800 institutions participated in the process, a 20% increase over 2019. The 2020 ranked lists were released by MHRD on 11 June 2020. For the first time, dental institutes were placed in a new category.

== Formation ==
MHRD organized a one-day workshop on 21 August 2014 on evolving methodologies for the ranking of institutions of higher education in India. The meeting resolved to establish a committee for building a national ranking framework. Later it was also decided to appoint representatives of central universities for the proposed committee. Based on these decisions, a core committee consisting of 16 members was constituted on 29 October 2014 with secretary (HE, MHRD, as chairperson and additional secretary (TE), MHRD, as member-secretary. The other members were the vice-chancellors of Delhi University, EFL University, Central University of Gujarat and JNU, the directors of the IIT Kharagpur, IIT Madras, IIM Ahmedabad, IIM Bangalore, NIT Tiruchirappalli, NIT Warangal, IIIT&M Gwalior, IISER Bhopal, SPA Delhi, NAAC, and chairperson of NBA.

The terms of reference of the committee were:

- Suggest a National Framework for performance measurement and ranking of
1. Institutions;
2. Programmes;
- Suggest the organizational structure, institutional mechanism and processes for implementation along with time-lines of the National Ranking Framework.
1. Suggest a mechanism for financing of the Scheme on National Ranking Framework.
2. Suggest linkages with National Assessment and Accreditation Council (NAAC) and National Board of Accreditation (NBA), if any.

The core committee identified a set of measurable parameters to be used as metrics for ranking the institutions. These parameters were grouped under five major headings. The committee suggested the weightages to be assigned to various groups of parameters in the case of institutions of engineering education, and left the task of carrying out similar exercises for institutions of other disciplines to other competent agencies. The initial draft of the report was prepared by Surendra Prasad, chairman of the National Board of Accreditation and Member of the core committee.

The University Grants Commission constituted an expert committee on 9 October 2015 to develop a framework for the ranking of universities and colleges in India and the framework developed by this expert committee has been incorporated into NIRF. The core committee also suggested a framework for ranking institutions offering management education also. The All India Council for Technical Education developed parameters and metrics for ranking institutions offering pharmacy education and also architecture education.

== Recommendations of the core committee ==
The following are some of the recommendations of the core committee:

- The metrics for ranking of engineering institutions should be based on the parameters agreed upon by the core committee.
- The parameters have been organized into five broad heads or groups and each group has been divided into suitable sub-groups. Each broad head has an overall weight assigned to it. Within each head, the sub-heads should also have appropriate weight distributions.
- A suitable metric has been proposed which computes a score under each sub-head. The sub-head scores are then added to obtain scores for each individual head. The overall score is computed-based on the weights allotted to each head. The overall score can take a maximum value of 100.
- The committee recommended the classification of institutions into two categories:

- Category A institutions: These are institutions of national importance set up by Acts of Parliament, State Universities, Deemed-to-be Universities, Private Universities and other autonomous institutions.
- Category B institutions: These are institutions affiliated to a University and do not enjoy full academic autonomy.

== Parameters and their weightages ==
=== Engineering, management, pharmacy and architecture institutions ===
The approved set of parameter groups and the weightages assigned to them in respect of institutions offering programmes in engineering, management, pharmacy and architecture are given in the following table.

Parameters	Category A institutions	Category B institutions
Teaching, learning and resources (TLR)	0.30	0.30
Research, professional practice and collaborative performance (RPC)	0.30	0.20
Graduation outcome (GO)	0.15	0.25
Outreach and inclusivity (OI)	0.15	0.15
Perception (PR)	0.10	0.10

=== Overall and colleges ===
The approved set of parameter groups and the weightages assigned to them in respect of overall rating and for colleges are given in the following table, for 2018.

Parameters	Overall	Colleges
Teaching, learning and resources (TLR)	0.30	0.40
Research, productivity, impact and IPR (RPII)	0.30	0.15
Graduation outcome (GO)	0.20	0.25
Outreach and inclusivity (OI)	0.10	0.10
Perception (PR)	0.10	0.10

== Latest ranking (2025) ==
Note: The India Rankings 2025, released in September 2025, continue NIRF's use of multiple categories including Overall, Universities, Engineering, Management, Medical, Research, Law, Agriculture, Architecture, Pharmacy, and Colleges.

- NIRF Overall Ranking 2025 (Top 100)
  - Tamil Nadu (17)
  - Maharashtra (11)
  - Uttar Pradesh (9)
  - Delhi (8)
  - Karnataka (6)
  - Punjab (6)
  - Odisha (5)
  - Telangana (5)
  - West Bengal (4)
  - Rajasthan (4)
  - Uttarakhand (4)
  - Kerala (4)
  - Assam (3)
  - Jammu and Kashmir (3)
  - Chandigarh (2)
  - Andhra Pradesh (2)
  - Madhya Pradesh (2)
  - Bihar (1)
  - Gujarat (1)
  - Himachal Pradesh (1)
  - Pondicherry (1)

=== Overall (Top 10) ===
Rank	Name	City	State/UT	NIRF Score	Budget	Institutional classification
1	Indian Institute of Technology Madras	Chennai	Tamil Nadu	87.31	₹996 crore (US$100 million)	Public
2	Indian Institute of Science	Bengaluru	Karnataka	85.00	₹918.27 crore (US$95 million)	Public
3	Indian Institute of Technology Bombay	Mumbai	Maharashtra	81.62	₹896 crore (US$93 million)	Public
4	Indian Institute of Technology Delhi	Delhi	Delhi	80.67	₹855.81 crore (US$89 million)	Public
5	Indian Institute of Technology Kanpur	Kanpur	Uttar Pradesh	77.25	₹865 crore (US$90 million)	Public
6	Indian Institute of Technology Kharagpur	Kharagpur	West Bengal	73.99	₹1,135.21 crore (US$120 million)	Public
▲7	Indian Institute of Technology Roorkee	Roorkee	Uttarakhand	71.73	₹781.35 crore (US$81 million)	Public
▼8	All India Institute of Medical Sciences, Delhi	New Delhi	Delhi	70.57	₹5,500.92 crore (US$570 million)	Public
▲9	Jawaharlal Nehru University	New Delhi	Delhi	69.62	₹200 crore (US$21 million)	Public
▲10	Banaras Hindu University	Varanasi	Uttar Pradesh	68.71	₹1,808.75 crore (US$190 million)	Public

=== Medical (Top 10) ===
Rank	Name	City	State/UT	NIRF Score	Budget	Institutional classification
1	All India Institute of Medical Sciences (AIIMS, New Delhi)	New Delhi	Delhi	91.80	₹5,500.92 crore (US$570 million)	Public
2	Postgraduate Institute of Medical Education and Research (PGIMER, Chandigarh)	Chandigarh	Chandigarh	82.58	₹2,504.65 crore (US$260 million)	Public
3	Christian Medical College (CMC, Vellore)	Vellore	Tamil Nadu	76.48	₹1,738 crore (US$180 million)	Private
▲4	Jawaharlal Institute of Postgraduate Medical Education and Research (JIPMER, Puducherry)	Pondichéry	Puducherry	73.30	₹1,496.46 crore (US$160 million)	Public
▲5	Sanjay Gandhi Postgraduate Institute of Medical Sciences (SGPGI, Lucknow)	Lucknow	Uttar Pradesh	70.09	₹1,160.5 crore (US$120 million)	Public
▲6	Institute of Medical Sciences (IMS-BHU, Varanasi)	Varanasi	Uttar Pradesh	70.05	₹581.6 crore (US$60 million)	Public
▼7	National Institute of Mental Health and Neurosciences (NIMHANS, Bengaluru)	Bengaluru	Karnataka	69.77	₹917.21 crore (US$95 million)	Public
▲8	King George's Medical University (KGMU, Lucknow)	Lucknow	Uttar Pradesh	68.77	₹1,640 crore (US$170 million)	Public
▼9	Amrita Vishwa Vidyapeetham	Coimbatore	Tamil Nadu	68.52	—N/a	Private
▼10	Kasturba Medical College	Manipal	Karnataka	68.05	—N/a	Private

=== Engineering (Top 10) ===
Rank	Name	City	State/UT	NIRF Score	Budget	Institutional classification
1	IIT Madras	Chennai	Tamil Nadu	88.72	₹996 crore (US$100 million)	Public
2	IIT Delhi	Delhi	Delhi	85.74	₹855.81 crore (US$89 million)	Public
3	IIT Bombay	Mumbai	Maharashtra	83.65	₹896 crore (US$93 million)	Public
4	IIT Kanpur	Kanpur	Uttar Pradesh	81.82	₹865 crore (US$90 million)	Public
5	IIT Kharagpur	Kharagpur	West Bengal	78.69	₹1,135.21 crore (US$120 million)	Public
6	IIT Roorkee	Roorkee	Uttarakhand	75.44	₹781.35 crore (US$81 million)	Public
▲7	IIT Hyderabad	Hyderabad	Telangana	72.31	₹300 crore (US$31 million)	Public
▼8	IIT Guwahati	Guwahati	Assam	72.24	₹442.38 crore (US$46 million)	Public
9	NIT Trichy	Tiruchirapalli	Tamil Nadu	68.14	—N/a	Public
10	IIT (BHU)	Varanasi	Uttar Pradesh	67.24	—N/a	Public

=== Universities (Top 10) ===
Rank	Name	City	State	NIRF Score	Budget	Institutional classification
1	Indian Institute of Science	Bengaluru	Karnataka	85.05	₹918.27 crore (US$95 million)	Public
2	Jawaharlal Nehru University	New Delhi	Delhi	71.00	₹200 crore (US$21 million)	Public
▲3	Manipal Academy of Higher Education	Manipal	Karnataka	69.25	—N/a	Private
▼4	Jamia Millia Islamia	New Delhi	Delhi	69.10	₹538.16 crore (US$56 million)	Public
▲5	Delhi University	New Delhi	Delhi	67.38	₹433 crore (US$45 million)	Public
▼6	Banaras Hindu University	Varanasi	Uttar Pradesh	67.28	₹1,808.75 crore (US$190 million)	Public
▲7	BITS Pilani	Pilani	Rajasthan	67.24	—N/a	Private
▼8	Amrita Vishwa Vidyapeetham	Coimbatore	Tamil Nadu	67.05	—N/a	Private
9	Jadavpur University	Kolkata	West Bengal	65.42	₹446.10 crore (US$46 million)	Public
▼10	Aligarh Muslim University	Aligarh	Uttar Pradesh	65.35	₹1,036 crore (US$110 million)	Public

=== Research Institutions (Top 10) ===
Rank	Name	City	State	NIRF Score	Budget	Institutional classification
1	IISc Bengaluru	Bengaluru	Karnataka	85.01	₹918.27 crore (US$95 million)	Public
2	IIT Madras	Chennai	Tamil Nadu	82.99	₹996 crore (US$100 million)	Public
3	IIT Delhi	New Delhi	Delhi	80.42	₹904.91 crore (US$94 million)	Public
4	IIT Bombay	Mumbai	Maharashtra	77.80	₹896 crore (US$93 million)	Public
5	IIT Kharagpur	Kharagpur	West Bengal	71.61	₹1,302.45 crore (US$140 million)	Public
▲6	IIT Kanpur	Kanpur	Uttar Pradesh	69.80	₹853 crore (US$89 million)	Public
▼7	Homi Bhabha National Institute	Mumbai	Maharashtra	69.39	Classified	Public
▲8	IIT Roorkee	Roorkee	Uttarakhand	67.27	₹781.35 crore (US$81 million)	Public
▲9	Academy of Scientific and Innovative Research	Ghaziabad	Uttar Pradesh	67.15	₹2,192.51 crore (US$230 million)	Public
10	IIT Guwahati	Guwahati	Assam	64.18	₹442.38 crore (US$46 million)	Public

=== Management (Top 10) ===
Rank	Name	City	State	NIRF Score	Budget	Institutional classification
1	IIM Ahmedabad	Ahmedabad	Gujarat	83.29	₹254.9 crore (US$26 million)	Public
2	IIM Bangalore	Bengaluru	Karnataka	81.56	₹217.5 crore (US$23 million)	Public
3	IIM Kozhikode	Kozhikode	Kerala	79.85	₹198 crore (US$21 million)	Public
4	IIT Delhi	South Delhi	Delhi	78.94	₹855.81 crore (US$89 million)	Public
▲5	IIM Lucknow	Lucknow	Uttar Pradesh	77.97	₹168.7 crore (US$18 million)	Public
6	IIM Mumbai	Mumbai	Maharastra	77.58	₹107.9 crore (US$11 million)	Public
▼7	IIM Calcutta	Kolkata	West Bengal	77.34	₹226.97 crore (US$24 million)	Public
8	IIM Indore	Indore	Madhya Pradesh	75.68	₹217.5 crore (US$23 million)	Public
▲9	Management Development Institute	Gurugram	Haryana	71.96	—N/a	Private
▼10	XLRI – Xavier School of Management	Jamshedpur	Jharkhand	70.63	—N/a	Private

=== Law (Top 10) ===
Rank	Name	City	State/UT	Budget	Institutional classification
1	National Law School of India University	Bengaluru	Karnataka	₹38 crore (US$3.9 million)	Public
2	National Law University, Delhi	Dwarka	Delhi	₹50.27 crore (US$5.2 million)	Public
3	NALSAR University of Law	Hyderabad	Telangana	—N/a	Public
4	The West Bengal National University of Juridical Sciences	Kolkata	West Bengal	₹37.08 crore (US$3.9 million)	Public
▲5	Gujarat National Law University	Gandhinagar	Gujarat	—N/a	Public
▲6	IIT Kharagpur	Kharagpur	West Bengal	₹1,302.45 crore (US$140 million)	Public
▼7	Symbiosis Law School	Pune	Maharashtra	—N/a	Private
▼8	Jamia Millia Islamia	New Delhi	Delhi	₹538.16 crore (US$56 million)	Public
▲9	Aligarh Muslim University	Aligarh	Uttar Pradesh	₹1,036 crore (US$110 million)	Public
▼10	Siksha 'O' Anusandhan	Bhubaneswar	Odisha	—N/a	Private

=== Architecture and Planning (Top 10) ===
Rank	Name	City	State/UT	NIRF Score	Budget	Institutional classification
1	IIT Roorkee	Roorkee	Uttarakhand	83.95	₹781.35 crore (US$81 million)	Public
▲2	NIT Calicut	Kozhikode	Kerala	77.89	—N/a	Public
▼3	IIT Kharagpur	Kharagpur	West Bengal	77.38	₹1,135.21 crore (US$120 million)	Public
4	IIEST, Shibpur	Howrah	West Bengal	68.37	₹202.49 crore (US$21 million)	Public
▲5	Jamia Millia Islamia	New Delhi	Delhi	67.15	₹538.16 crore (US$56 million)	Public
6	CEPT University	Ahmedabad	Gujarat	65.73	—N/a	Private
▲7	NIT Rourkela	Rourkela	Odisha	65.72	—N/a	Public
▼8	School of Planning and Architecture	New Delhi	Delhi	65.11	—N/a	Public
▼9	NIT Trichy	Tiruchirappalli	Tamil Nadu	64.30	—N/a	Public
10	Visvesvaraya National Institute of Technology	Nagpur	Maharashtra	61.22	—N/a	Public

=== Pharmacy (Top 10) ===
Rank	Name	City	State/UT	NIRF Score	Budget	Institutional classification
1	Jamia Hamdard	New Delhi	Delhi	86.59	—	Private, but partially government-funded
▲2	BITS Pilani	Pilani	Rajasthan	82.28	—	Private
▲3	Panjab University	Chandigarh	Chandigarh	76.39	₹868.46 crore (US$90 million)	Public
4	JSS College of Pharmacy, Ooty	Ooty	Tamil Nadu	76.14	—	Private
▲5	National Institute of Pharmaceutical Education and Research (NIPER, Hyderabad)	Hyderabad	Telangana	75.64	₹200.07 crore (US$21 million)	Public
▼6	Institute of Chemical Technology	Mumbai	Maharastra	74.77		Public
▼7	JSS College of Pharmacy, Mysore	Mysore	Karnataka	73.38	—	Private
8	Manipal College of Pharmaceutical Sciences	Udupi	Karnataka	73.25	—	Private
9	National Institute of Pharmaceutical Education and Research (NIPER, Mohali)	Mohali	Punjab	70.96	₹200.07 crore (US$21 million)	Public
▲10	SRM Institute of Science and Technology	Chennai	Tamil Nadu	70.84	—	Private

== Criticism ==
The rankings have been criticized as manipulative by students and some academics. NIRF rankings has been criticized by several scientists for encouraging academic fraud in India, such as research paper mills, salami slicing, citation stacking and fake overseas patents, to artificially inflate NIRF rankings, as quantity of research output occupies a large weight-age in the rankings. NIRF started to penalize paper retractions of universities from 2025, although concerns of ranking manipulations through academic fraud have also been raised since. NIRF ranking also relies on self-reported data which is criticized for lack of transparent independent auditing in the process whereas its reliance on third party sources has been criticized as reliance on incomplete data by IIT(BHU) in one instance. Data manipulation is subject for removal of university listing in NIRF. Other criticisms of the ranking framework is inadequate measurement of education quality, and use of same critirea for ranking regardless of operational budget of institutes. Shortcomings of the ranking metrics is also flagged as a concern, for having skewed focus/greater weight-age on quantitative parameters leading to irrational overall scores and rankings, such as practical signals like "Placement percentage" and "Median compensation awarded to students" being assigned very low weight-age relative to parameters like "Number of PhD students" and "University Exams" in 2025 rankings.

In response to a PIL, on 27 March 2025 Madurai Bench of the Madras High Court puts stay order on publishing NIRF ranking for 2025. PIL petition has claimed that NIRF continuously providing rank and unjustly promoting to multiple number of institutions on the basis of fake and fraud information from past many years without cross-checking, even those institutions failed to meet basic medical education standard. Whole ranking process is based on lack of transprency since NBA collect The data direct from the institution websites without any cross verification for authenticity, resulting in the publication of manipulated data in the ranking list. On May 10, Madras High Court dismissed the PIL petition and lifted the interim stay on release of NIRF ranking noting that there was insufficient data available to enable a comparison or to assess the accuracy of the rankings.

== See also ==
- Goodhart's law
- National Skill Development Agency
- National Education Policy 2020
- Skill India
- Publish or perish
- Academic careerism
- Scientific misconduct
- India Research Watch
- Times Higher Education World University Rankings
