= Body Image (journal) =

- Discipline: Psychology
- Language: English
- Edited by: Tracy L. Tylka

Publication details
- History: 2004–present
- Publisher: Elsevier
- Frequency: Quarterly
- Impact factor: 5.580 (2021)

Standard abbreviations
- ISO 4: Body Image

Indexing
- ISSN: 1740-1445 (print); 1873-6807 (web)
- LCCN: 2004243770
- OCLC no.: 53914163

Links
- Journal homepage; Online archive

Body Image is a quarterly peer-reviewed academic journal covering the study of body image as it pertains to psychology and other disciplines. It was established in 2004 and is published by Elsevier. The editor-in-chief is Tracy L. Tylka (Ohio State University).

== Abstracting and indexing ==
The journal is abstracted and indexed in:

- CINAHL
- Current Contents/Social and Behavioral Sciences
- Embase
- Index Medicus/MEDLINE/PubMed
- PsycINFO
- Scopus
- Social Sciences Citation Index

According to the Journal Citation Reports, the journal has a 2021 impact factor of 5.580. The journal exhibited unusual levels of self-citation and its 2019 journal impact factor was suspended from the Journal Citation Reports in 2020, a sanction which hit 34 journals in total.
