= Journal of Medical Biochemistry =

Scientific journal

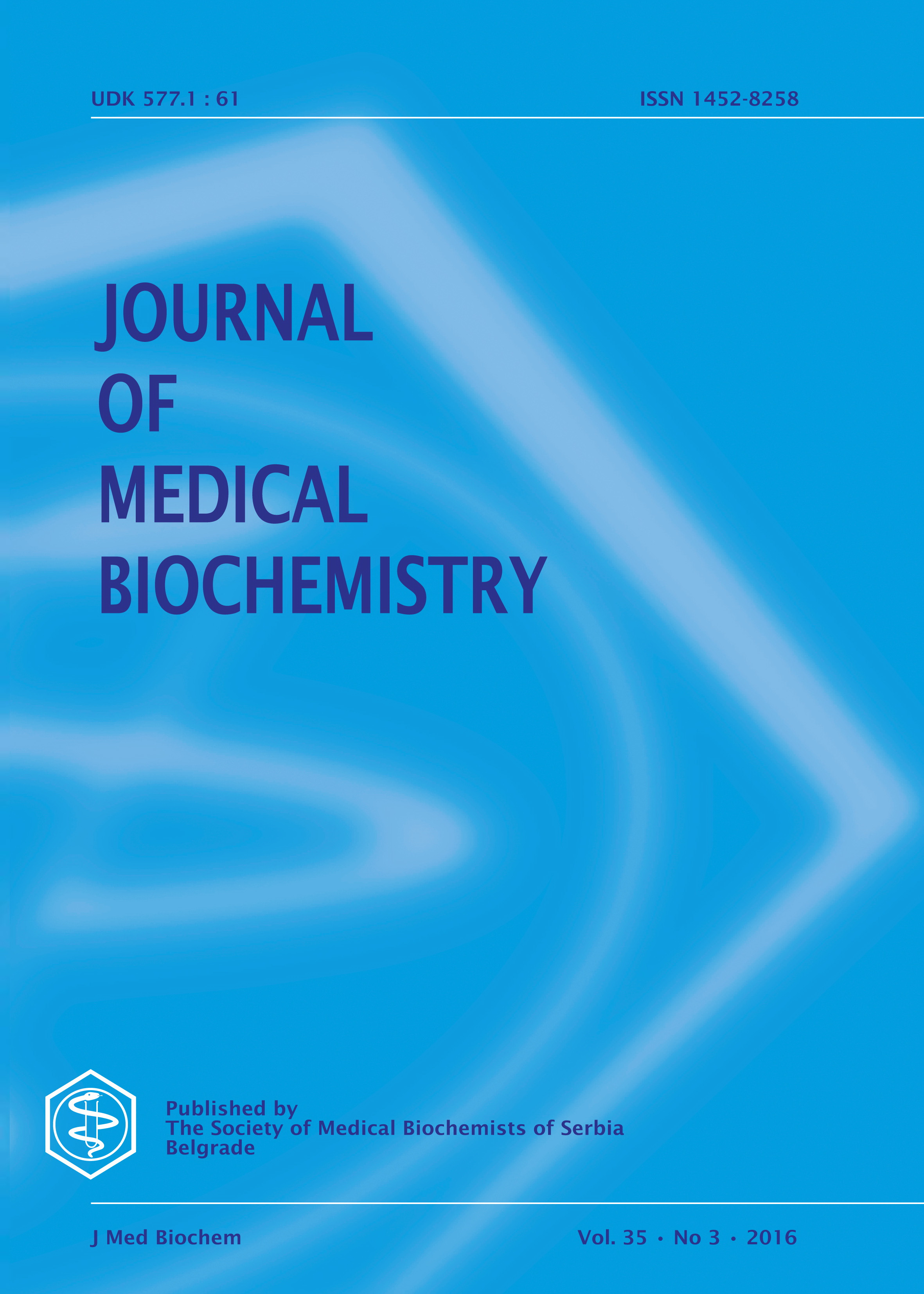
- Language: English
- Edited by: Nada Majkić-Singh

Publication details
- Former name: Jugoslavenska medicinska biokemija
- History: 1982–present
- Publisher: Walter de Gruyter on behalf of the Society of Medical Biochemists of Serbia
- Frequency: Quarterly
- Open access: Yes

Standard abbreviations
- ISO 4: J. Med. Biochem.

Indexing
- CODEN: JMBBAN
- ISSN: 1452-8258 (print); 1452-8266 (web)
- LCCN: 2015207002
- OCLC no.: 318203958

Links
- Journal homepage

The Journal of Medical Biochemistry is a quarterly peer-reviewed open access medical journal covering research in medical biochemistry, clinical chemistry, and related disciplines. It was established in 1982 as Jugoslovenska medicinska biohemija, obtaining its current name in 2007. It is published by Walter de Gruyter on behalf of the Society of Medical Biochemists of Serbia.

The journal exhibited unusual levels of self-citation and its journal impact factor of 2019 was suspended from the Journal Citation Reports in 2020, a sanction which hit 34 journals in total.

== Editors-in-chief ==
The following persons are or have been editors-in-chief of the journal:

- Neda Longino (1982–1988)
- Ernest Suchanek (1988–1992)
- Nada Majkić-Singh (1992–present)

== Abstracting and indexing ==
The journal is abstracted and indexed in:

- AGRICOLA
- CAB Abstracts
- Chemical Abstracts Service
- EBSCO databases
- Elsevier Biobase
- Embase
- ProQuest databases
- Referativny Zhurnal
- Science Citation Index Expanded
- Scopus
