= Virginia Parker Prize =

Canadian musician award

The Virginia Parker Prize (originally known as the Virginia P. Moore Prize) is an annual award given to outstanding young classical musicians (singers, instrumentalists, or conductors) who have previously been recipients of Canada Council grants. The Virginia Parker Prize recipients receive $25,000 to help further their professional careers.

Originally established by Virginia Parker and her husband Thomas Alexander Gzowski (T.A.G.) Moore in 1982, the prize is funded by the Virginia Parker Foundation and is now administered by the Canada Council.

== Past prize winners ==
- Jon Kimura Parker (1984)
- Sophie Rolland (1985)
- Sandra Graham (1986)
- Gilles Auger (1987)
- Jamie (James E. Kimura) Parker (1988)
- Marc-André Hamelin (1989)
- Nancy Argenta (1990)
- Michael Schade (1991)
- Corey Cerovsek (1992)
- Martin Beaver (1993)
- Scott St. John (1994)
- Karina Gauvin (1995)
- Alain Trudel (1996)
- James Ehnes (1997)
- Richard Raymond (1998)
- Lucille Chung (1999)
- Yannick Nézet-Séguin (2000)
- Marie-Nicole Lemieux (2001)
- Stewart Goodyear (2002)
- Julie-Anne Derome (2003)
- Jasper Wood (2004)
- Isabel Bayrakdarian (2005)
- Shannon Mercer (2006)
- David Jalbert (2007)
- Jean-Philippe Sylvestre (2008)
- Wallace Halladay (2009)
- Alexandre Da Costa (2010)
- Kaori Yamagami (2011)
- Daniel Cabena (2012)
- Layla Claire (2013)
- Caroline Cole (2014)
- Yolanda Bruno (2015)
- Mira E. Benjamin (2016)
- Vanessa Roussel (2017)
- Blake Pouliot (2018)
- Stéphane Tétreault (2019)
- Jordan de Souza (2020)
- Cameron Crozman (2021)
- Naomi Woo (2022)
- Bryan Cheng (2023)
