= Blood Cancer United =

North American blood cancer charitable organization

- Formation: 1949; 77 years ago
- Founder: Rudolph and Antoinette Roesler de Villiers
- Type: Charity
- Legal status: 501(c)(3) nonprofit organization
- Purpose: Funding blood cancer research, patient and family support services, outreach
- Headquarters: 1201 15th Street N.W., Suite 410, Washington, D.C. 200053
- Region served: United States and Canada
- President and CEO: E. Anders Kolb, MD
- CMO: Gwen Nichols, MD
- CFO: JR Miller
- Affiliations: The LLS of Canada
- Revenue: ▲US$443.86 million (2022)
- Website: bloodcancerunited.org
- Formerly called: Robert Roesler de Villiers Foundation (1949–1954) Leukemia Society (1955–1965); Leukemia Society of America (1966–1999) Leukemia & Lymphoma Society (1999–2025)

Blood Cancer United, a 501(c)(3) charitable organization founded in 1949, is a voluntary health organization dedicated to fighting blood cancer world-wide. Blood Cancer United funds blood cancer research to develop cures for all types of blood cancer, including Hodgkin's disease, Leukemia, Lymphoma, Myelodysplastic syndrome, Myeloma, and Myeloproliferative neoplasm. Formerly known as the Leukemia & Lymphoma Society, the organization provides free information and support services, and it advocates for blood cancer patients and their families seeking access to quality and affordable care.

Blood Cancer United is headquartered in Washington D.C., with 27 regional offices throughout the United States and five regional offices in Canada. The organization has raised and donated more than $2 billion (USD) to blood cancer research.

== History ==
=== Robert Roesler de Villiers Foundation (1949–1954) ===
Originally known as the Robert Roesler de Villiers Foundation, Blood Cancer United was founded in New York City in 1949 by Rudolph and Antoinette de Villiers after the death of their son Robert from leukemia. The foundation was led by Antoinette, starting with a small Manhattan office with an initial investment of two thousand dollars and a small staff of volunteers. At the time, there was a lack of effective medications, support facilities, and single-agent chemotherapy.

The organization sponsored annual international research competitions with monetary awards to conduct research for treating leukemia. In 1951 the organization launched a contest for the best research paper on leukemia treatment. In the first year, there were 30 entries but no winners. The following year, Ludwik Gross was selected for the first prize and a grant to continue research.

=== Leukemia Society (1955–1965) ===
The organization changed its name to the Leukemia Society in 1955. During this era, the Leukemia Society opened local chapters in the New York Metro area. By 1957, the Leukemia Society had chapters in Brooklyn, NY; Massapequa, NY; Little Neck, NY; and Westchester County. The Leukemia Society created its first Patient Services Committee in 1959.

=== Leukemia Society of America (1966–1999) ===
In 1966, the organization was renamed Leukemia Society of America. In 1968, the Leukemia Society of America published Closing In, Research on Leukemia, a book summarizing its progress in fighting leukemia.

In 1968, the Patient Services Committee created the Patient Aid Programs that helped cover patient medications, lab fees, blood transfusions, transportation, and medical services support.

William Dameshek organized and created the LLS grant review process in the early 1960s. Due to his contributions to leukemia research and the organization, the Leukemia Society of America created the Dameshek Award in 1969.

The Leukemia Society of America became known for its fundraising campaigns, such as Four Hours for Life in 1983 and the Leukemia Cup Regatta in 1994.

In 1987 the Leukemia Society of America partnered with the Leukemia Research Fund (U.K.). It launched the peer-reviewed medical Journal, Leukemia. The Journal continues publishing today under the Nature Publishing Group.

In 1990, the Leukemia Society of America published an adult patient support book, Coping with Survival, Support for People Living with Adult Leukemia and Lymphoma.

=== The Leukemia & Lymphoma Society (2000–2025) ===
The name was changed to The Leukemia & Lymphoma Society (LLS) in 2000 to reflect the organization's focus on all types of blood cancer. In 2004, LLS became affiliated with the Leukemia Research Fund of Canada, which became known as The Leukemia & Lymphoma Society of Canada.

Louis J. DeGennaro was hired in 2005 and appointed President & CEO in 2014.

The organization launched the LLS National Patient Registry in honor of Michael Garil. Blood cancer patients voluntarily enrolled in the registry. The platform digitally compiles medical records so patients can access medical records across healthcare systems. In 2021, The Leukemia & Lymphoma Society Registry began collecting COVID-19 vaccine data from blood cancer patients. The platform provided the largest COVID-19 vaccine safety and efficacy data set in blood cancer patients.

LLS was awarded a place on Fast Company's 2022 Brands That Matter list. The organization has a Four-Star rating with Charity Navigator.

In 2023, the organization announced E. Anders Kolb as its President and Chief Executive Officer.

=== Blood Cancer United (2025-present) ===
The name was changed to Blood Cancer United on August 28, 2025 to reflect all 100+ types of blood cancer.

== Research ==
Since its founding, Blood Cancer United has contributed more than $2 billion (USD) to blood cancer research. As there are no means of preventing blood cancers, Blood Cancer United is focused on funding research for every type of blood cancer to advance treatments and cures. The organization funds research in areas of unmet medical need and helps to bridge the gap between academic discovery and drug development.

=== Acute leukemia ===
==== Acute myeloid leukemia ====
Acute myeloid leukemia (AML) is a rapidly progressing disease that remains one of the most deadly blood cancers, killing more than 11,000 Americans a year. Despite advances in treating other blood cancers, the standard of treatment for AML – a combination of toxic chemotherapies – has changed little over the past four decades. In October 2016, Blood Cancer United launched its Beat AML Master Clinical Trial, a collaborative precision medicine clinical trial that identifies targeted therapies for patients based on their genetic markers.

Blood Cancer United is leading the Beat AML Master Clinical Trial and is the first nonprofit cancer organization to sponsor a cancer clinical trial. The trial is a collaboration among multiple leading cancer centers, pharmaceutical companies, a clinical research organization, and a genomics analysis company. The protocol for the trial was developed with input from the U.S. Food and Drug Administration (FDA). The Beat AML Master Clinical Trial is expected to eventually include 500 patients and will continue for at least two more years at between 15 and 20 clinical sites.

=== Acute lymphoblastic leukemia ===
Blood Cancer United currently contributes towards research into immunotherapies targeting acute lymphoblastic leukemia (ALL). As part of a wider funding effort including over a dozen other cancer immunotherapy projects, Blood Cancer United supports more effective and targeted treatments utilizing the body's own internal attack mechanisms. In late 2017, Blood Cancer United awarded researchers at UNC School of Medicine a $600,000 grant to support clinical research on chimeric antigen receptor (CAR) T cell therapies with an immunosuppressive "safety switch". This approach aims to mitigate the potentially lethal side effects of immunotherapy—such as cytokine release syndrome—by halting the activity of infused T cells, in the event a patient experiences severe treatment toxicity.

== Patient support ==
Blood Cancer United is a source of blood cancer information, education and support for patients, their families, survivors, and healthcare professionals. In 1997, Blood Cancer United created the Information Resource Center (IRC) to provide blood cancer patients, their families, and healthcare professionals with accurate, current disease information, resources, and support.

Blood Cancer United provides direct financial support to eligible patients with blood cancer, including assistance with copayments, treatment-related travel, and certain non-medical expenses.

Blood Cancer United Information Specialists are master's level oncology social workers, nurses, and health educators. A Blood Cancer United Information Specialist can assist patients through cancer treatment, financial and social challenges, and can provide accurate, up-to-date disease, treatment, and support information. As a community-based voluntary health organization, Blood Cancer United has regional offices throughout the United States and Canada to support blood cancer patients in North America.

== Advocacy ==
The Blood Cancer United Office of Public Policy advances Blood Cancer United's mission through advocacy aimed at governmental decision-makers. Through Blood Cancer United's nationwide grassroots network of more than 30,000 volunteers, Blood Cancer United advocates for blood cancer patients at the state and federal level. These efforts help to increase federal and state research funds for blood cancer; expedite the review and approval for new blood cancer new therapies, and ensure that patients are able to access their treatments. Blood Cancer United also supports public policy positions that accelerate progress toward cures for blood cancers, and improve the quality of life of blood cancer patients and their families.

== Fundraising ==
Blood Cancer United has five national fundraising campaigns: Light The Night, Team In Training, Visionaries of the Year, Student Visionaries of the Year, and Big Climb. Light The Night is Blood Cancer United's largest community initiative to build awareness of blood cancers as well as raise money for research and support of patients and their families. Participants carry illuminated lanterns of different colors. White lanterns are carried by survivors, red by supporters, and gold lanterns are carried by those walking in memory of a loved one they lost. Patients, their family, friends, and colleagues take part in the annual evening walk which is at a leisurely pace, ensuring that all participants are able to enjoy the event.
