= Opera Atelier =

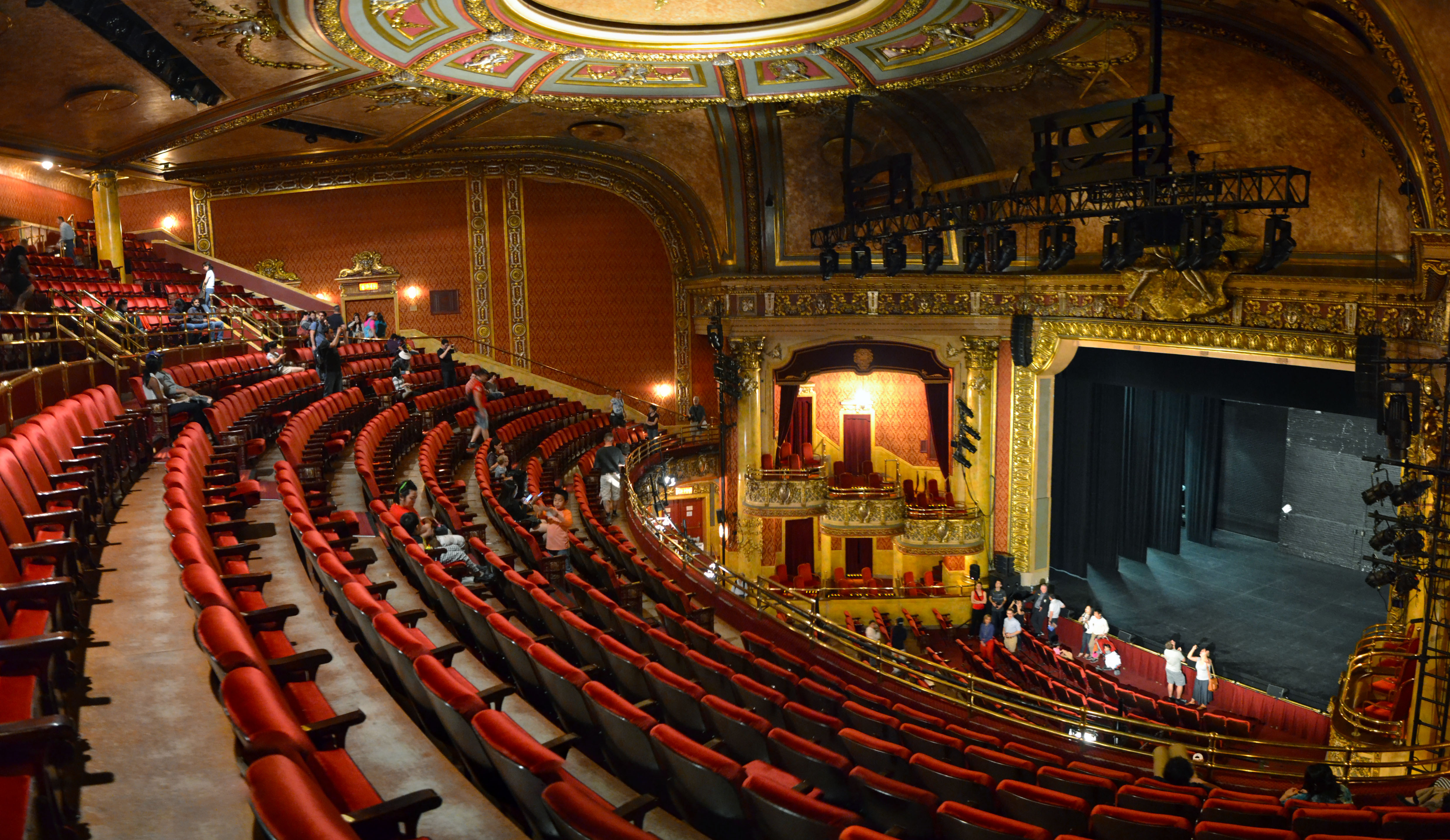
- The Elgin Theatre
- Formation: 1985
- Founder: Marshall Pynkoski, Jeannette Lajeunesse Zingg
- Type: Performing arts company
- Legal status: Registered charity
- Purpose: Historically informed performance
- Location: Toronto, Ontario, Canada
- Products: Baroque Opera and Ballet
- Key people: Alexandra Skoczylas (Executive Director), Measha Brueggergosman-Lee (Artist in Residence)
- Awards: Ordre des Arts et des Lettres (France), Ruby Award (Opera Canada), Muriel Sherrin Award for outstanding contribution to music in Toronto, Dora Mavor Moore Award, Lieutenant Governor's Award for the Arts
- Website: operaatelier.com

Opera Atelier is an opera company located in Toronto, Ontario, Canada. It was founded in 1985. The company mounts baroque operas and ballets from the 17th and 18th centuries that are presented in venues located in Toronto's Theatre District. For many years, their productions have been performed at the Elgin Theatre.

Patricia Barretto served as the executive director from 2011 to 2015. The company has performed baroque operas in New York, Houston, Stuttgart, Bremen, London, Singapore, Seoul, and Tokyo, and at the Glimmerglass Festival and Chateau de Versailles, France. Opera Atelier received a number of Lieutenant Governor's Awards for the Arts before these were discontinued in 2003.

Opera Atelier presents two full operas per year and tours internationally biennially. They use period instruments, as well as sets and costume designs that reflect the aesthetics of the epoch.

Opera Atelier has collaborated with other music organizations in Toronto, including the Tafelmusik Baroque Orchestra (Opera Atelier's pit orchestra for performances at the Elgin Theatre) and the Royal Conservatory of Music. The organization also benefits from funding from the Toronto Arts Council.
