= Layla Claire =

Canadian soprano opera singer

- Born: 1982 (age 42–43); Penticton, British Columbia, Canada
- Genres: Classical; Opera
- Occupation: Opera singer (soprano)
- Website: laylaclaire.com

Layla Claire (born 1982) is a Canadian soprano opera singer.

== Life and career ==
She was born in Penticton, British Columbia. She is a graduate of the Lindemann Young Artist at the Metropolitan Opera, where she made her debut as Tebaldo in Verdi's Don Carlos in 2010. She studied at Université de Montréal and graduated from the Curtis Institute of Music in 2009. She was awarded the Prix des Amis d'Aix-en-Provence for best Mozart performance for her 2012 European debut as Sandrina ('La finta giardiniera) and has since made acclaimed debuts at the Salzburg Festival as Donna Elvira (Don Giovanni), Opernhaus Zürich as the Governess (The Turn of the Screw), Washington National Opera as Blanche de la Force (Dialogues des Carmélites), Canadian Opera Company as Fiordiligi (Cosi fan tutte), Glyndebourne Festival Opera as Donna Anna (Don Giovanni), Händel-Festspiele Karlsruhe as Tusnelda (Arminio), and returned to the stage of the Metropolitan Opera as Anne Truelove (The Rake's Progress). Ms. Claire has worked with major conductors including Tilson-Thomas, Nézet-Séguin, Haitink, Langrée and Hrůša in works by Mahler, Beethoven, Haydn, Mozart and Dvořák. She sang Cathy in the French stage premiere of Herrmann's Wuthering Heights in Nancy in May 2019 conducted by Jacques Lacombe.

== Operatic Repertoire ==
Layla Claire's repertoire includes:

- Countess, The Marriage of Figaro (Mozart)
- Pamina, Die Zauberflöte (Mozart)
- Sandrina, La finta giardiniera (Mozart)
- Fiordiligi, Così fan tutte (Mozart)
- Donna Anna, Donna Elvira, Don Giovanni (Mozart)
- Helena, A Midsummer Night's Dream (Britten)
- Governess, The Turn of the Screw (Britten)
- Blanche, Dialogues of the Carmelites (Poulenc)
- Anne Trulove, The Rake's Progress (Stravinsky)
- Tusnelda, Arminio (Handel)

== Awards ==
- 2010 The Hildegard Behrens Foundation Award.
- 2008 Mozart Prize at the Wilhelm Stenhammar International Music Competition
- 2008 Queen Elisabeth Competition Laureate
- 2007 Britten-Pears Young Artist
- 2013 Virginia Parker Prize
- CBC Radio-Canada Jeunes Artistes recital winner
- J. Desmarais Foundation Bursaries
- Canada Council Grant
