= Norbert Kraft =

Canadian guitarist and music teacher

Norbert Kraft (born 21 August 1950) is a Canadian guitarist, music teacher, producer and arranger.

== Life ==
Born in Linz, Austria, Kraft's family emigrated to Canada in 1954. He studied at the Royal Conservatory of Music at Toronto with Carl van Feggelen and later with John Mills and Aaron Shearer.

An international performer, Kraft has also recorded and (together with his wife Bonnie Silver, who is also a pianist and harpsichordist) produced many albums on the Naxos Records label. In 1994, he launched the label's Guitar Collection as producer and artistic director.

Kraft specializes in solo guitar pieces from the 17th to 20th centuries as well as concerto repertoire. He has published many arrangements and transcriptions of baroque and later solo and chamber music, including works for guitar and harpsichord. He has compiled and edited a series of graded technical exercises and repertoire for the guitar. These were published in 1978 as "Classical Guitar Editions" and were adopted as official curriculum by the Royal Conservatory of Music (Toronto). He is also a composer for classical guitar.

He has served on the faculties of Manhattan School of Music, University of Toronto and the Royal Conservatory of Music.

== Awards ==
- Grand Prize in the 1975 Canadian CBC Radio Competition
- 1985 Andrés Segovia International Guitar Competition (the first North American to do so)
- Gramophone Magazine "Critic's Choice for 1989"
- Classic CD Magazine "Favourite CD of the Year"

== See also ==
- Canadian classical music
- The Royal Conservatory of Music
