= Team In Training =

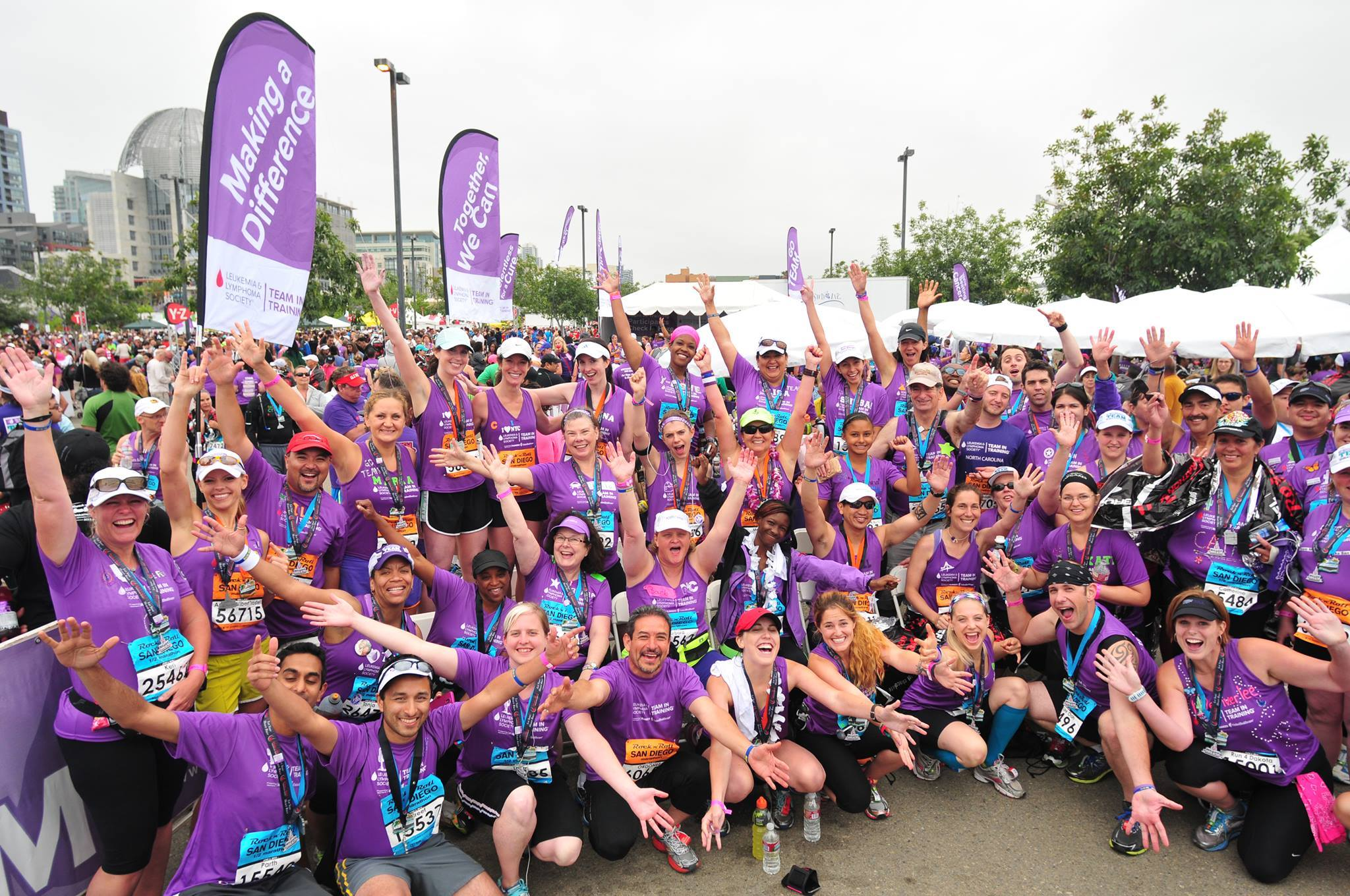
Team In Training

Team In Training (TNT) is the flagship fundraising program for the Leukemia & Lymphoma Society (LLS), the world's largest voluntary health organization dedicated to funding blood cancer research, education and patient services. TNT is the only endurance sports training program where volunteers train to complete a marathon, half marathon, cycle event, triathlon or hike adventure, while fundraising to support the fight against blood cancers.

TNT participants train with experienced coaches who provide personalized workouts and clinics on nutrition, injury prevention and hydration. Coaches not only prepare participants prior to the event, but are at the event coaching along the course of the event ensuring every TNT participant crosses the finish line.

Today's participants travel to destinations like New York City, Lake Tahoe, Los Angeles, San Francisco, Florida, Washington, D.C., and Hawaii.

== History ==
In 1988, Bruce Cleland assembled a team to run the New York City Marathon and raise money in honor of his daughter, a leukemia survivor. This team of 38 runners raised $322,000 for The Leukemia & Lymphoma Society's (LLS) work to discover new treatments for blood cancers.

== Recognition ==
In 2015, TNT was voted "Best of" by Competitor Magazine for the best charity training program. This recognition is voted on by Competitor Magazine's online readers and social media followers from around the United States.

Team In Training has been voted the "Best of" charity training program since in 2010 by Competitor Magazine's readers.

== Teams ==
Team In Training allows participants to create larger teams through their companies or communities.

Creating a TNT corporate team allows employees the camaraderie of working together for the common goal of raising research funds for blood cancer patients. The company will benefit from the hands-on-support provided by the TNT coaches and volunteers, as well as have a positive impact on the fitness and health of employees. Companies like Goldman Sachs and NARS Cosmetics have fundraised for Team In Training.

Communities teams benefit and honor blood cancer patients, while reinforcing a support system that team members will benefit from even after the TNT event. Community teams bring together friends and family in a socially responsible way, in helping to create a world without blood cancers.

== See also ==
Relay for Life
