= Ottawa Bach Choir =

- Origin: Ottawa, Canada
- Genres: Early music, Renaissance music, Baroque music
- Years active: 2002–present
- Label: ATMA Classique
- Website: ottawabachchoir.ca

The Ottawa Bach Choir is a professional vocal ensemble from Ottawa, Canada founded and directed by Lisette Canton specialising in early music. Their album Handel: Dixit Dominus; Bach & Schütz: Motets (2019) won a Juno Award for Classical Album of the Year – Vocal or Choral Performance at the Juno Awards of 2020.

== History ==
The Ottawa Bach Choir were founded in 2002 by Lisette Canton. In 2016, the choir toured China as the representative of Canada in the Meet in Beijing Internations Arts Festival. In 2014, the choir became the first Canadian choir invited to sing at Bachfest Leipzig In 2011, the choir made their Carnegie Hall Debut

== 2020 season ==
On January 18, 2020, the Ottawa Bach Choir were nominated for a Juno Award for their album Handel: Dixit Dominus; Bach & Schütz: Motets . In June 2020, the choir are set to return to BachFest Leipzig as part of their Bachfest - We Are Family! celebrations. The Ottawa Bach Choir are the first and only Canadian choir to ever perform at the festival.

== Lisette Canton ==
Lisette Canton is the founder and artistic director of the Ottawa Bach Choir. Canton is an associate professor and head of choral music at York University in Toronto. Canton has conducted in Leipzig, London, Paris, Venice, Lübeck, Stuttgart, Bayreuth, Vienna, Salzburg, Prague, Amsterdam, Groningen, Ypres, Passchendaele, Mexico City, at Roy Thomson Hall in Toronto, the Winspear Centre in Edmonton, Montreal and Halifax; and has prepared choirs for Franz-Paul Decker, Johannes Ullrich, Pinchas Zukerman, Helmuth Rilling and John Rutter.

== Discography ==
Festival Baroque (2005)
Jesu, meine Freude (2008)
Cantate Domino - 10th Anniversary (2011)
'Twas But Pure Love (2016)
Handel: Dixit Dominus; Bach & Schütz: Motets (ATMA Classique: 2019) Juno-nominated
