= Alexandre Da Costa =

Canadian violinist and conductor

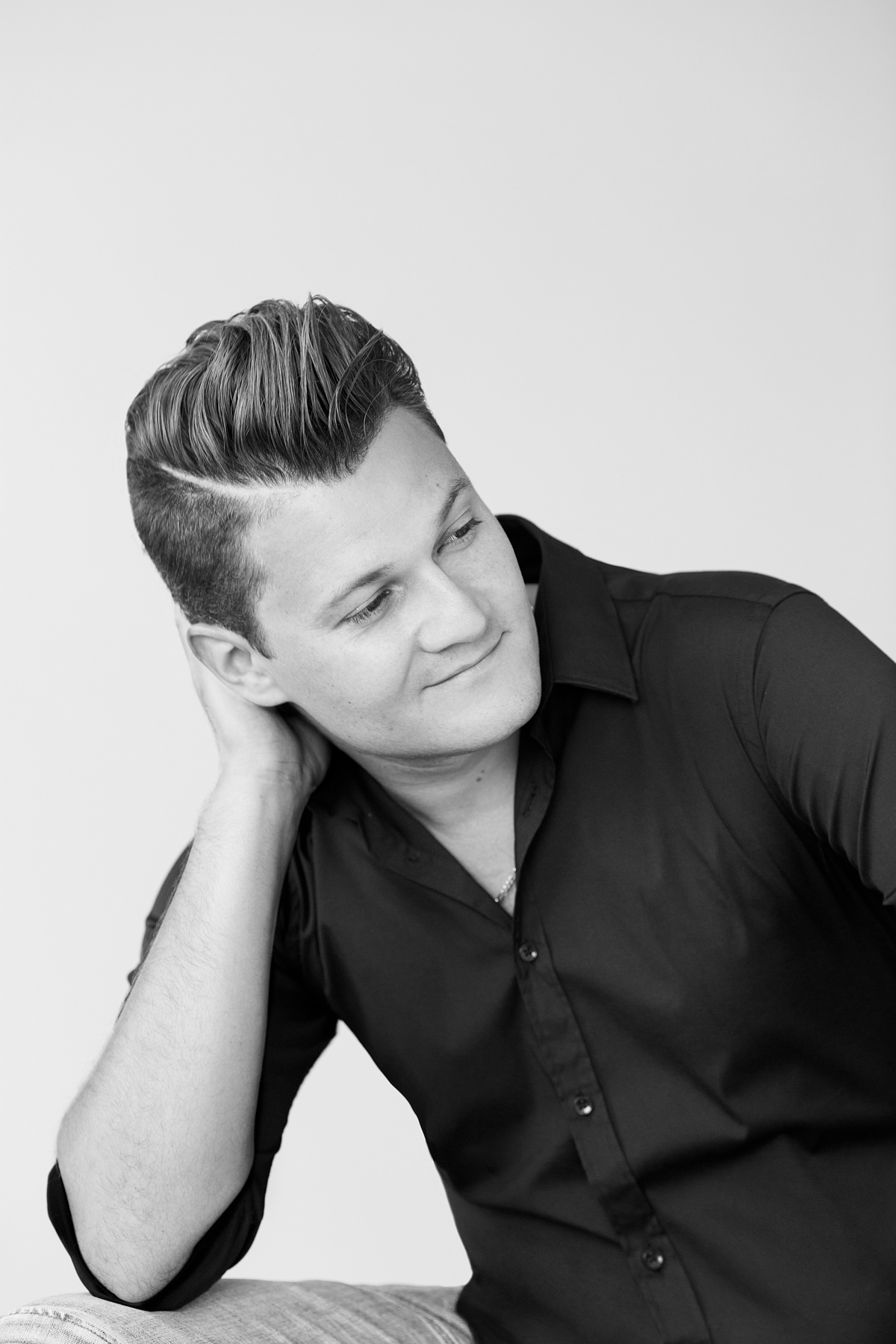

Background information
- Born: Montreal, Quebec, Canada
- Genre: Classical
- Occupations: Violinist, conductor, artistic director
- Instrument: Violin
- Website: http://www.alexandredacosta.com/

Alexandre Da Costa is a Canadian concert violinist and conductor from Montreal, Quebec.

He is the artistic director of the Orchestre philharmonique du Québec.

== Education ==
Da Costa has a bachelor's degree in performance (piano) from the Faculty of Music of the Université de Montréal and master's degree in violin.

He also studied violin at the Reina Sofía School of Music.

== Career ==
Da Costa is both a conductor and a virtuoso violinist who plays with a 1727 Stradivarius Di Barbaro violin using a Sartory bow.

In 2010, he won the Canada Council's Virginia Parker prize and has also won the Pablo Sarasate International Violin Competition. In 2012, he won the Juno Award for the Classical album of the Year.

In 2021, his contract as the artistic director of the Orchestre Symphonique De Longueuil was renewed for ten years.

== See also ==
- Canadian classical music
- List of Stradivarius instruments
