= Tafelmusik Baroque Orchestra =

Canadian period orchestra

The Tafelmusik Baroque Orchestra (also known simply as Tafelmusik) is a Canadian orchestra specializing in historically-informed performance.

The orchestra was founded in 1979 by oboist Kenneth Solway and bassoonist Susan Graves.

The orchestra has sixteen full-time members who specialize in historical performance and technique, with additional musicians joining the ensemble when required.

The Tafelmusik Chamber Choir, under the direction of Ivars Taurins, was formed in 1981 to complement the orchestra.

== Performing ==
The orchestra has toured in 350 cities in 32 countries, across Canada, the United States, Europe, Asia and Australia. From 1993 to 2011, Tafelmusik was orchestra in residence at the German Klang und Raum Festival in the small village of Irsee in Bavaria.

In 2002, the Tafelmusik Baroque Summer Institute was created to provide pre-professional and professional musicians with a training programme in instrumental and vocal baroque performance practice.

Notable projects include The Galileo Project, House of Dreams, Circle of Creation, and Tales of Two Cities.

== Awards ==
- 10 JUNO Awards, most recently for Classical Album of the Year for Beethoven's Symphonies Nos. 5 and 6, and Children's Album Of The Year for Baroque Adventure: The Quest for Arundo Donax
- The Echo Klassik Award for Best Orchestra of the Year

== Discography ==
The orchestra has made over 80 recordings, DVDs and CDs. The recordings include:

- Haydn Symphonies 43 & 49 with Rachel Podger (2024)
- The complete symphonies of Beethoven (conducted by Bruno Weil)
- Music of Joseph Bologne
- Bach, Handel, Vivaldi concertos, most recently Vivaldi con amore (2019)
- Haydn, Mozart and Mendelssohn symphonies (conducted by Bruno Weil)

== See also ==
- Baroque orchestra
- Canadian classical music
- List of early music ensembles
