= Leukemia (journal) =

- Discipline: Hematology, oncology
- Language: English
- Edited by: Andreas Hochhaus and Robert Peter Gale

Publication details
- History: 1987–present
- Publisher: Nature Publishing Group
- Frequency: Monthly
- Impact factor: 11.528 (2020)

Standard abbreviations
- ISO 4: Leukemia

Indexing
- ISSN: 0887-6924 (print); 1476-5551 (web)
- OCLC no.: 485729480

Links
- Journal homepage; Online archive

Leukemia is a peer-reviewed medical journal published by the Springer Nature Publishing Group. It was established in 1987 by Nicole Muller-Bérat Killman and Sven-Aage Killman, and is currently edited by professors Andreas Hochhaus and Robert Peter Gale. The journal covers research on all aspects of leukemia.

== Abstracting and indexing ==
The journal is abstracted and indexed in:

- Elsevier BIOBASE/Current Awareness in Biological Sciences
- BIOSIS Previews
- Cambridge Scientific Abstracts
- Current Contents/Life Sciences
- EMBASE/Excerpta Medica
- MEDLINE/Index Medicus
- Science Citation Index

According to the Journal Citation Reports, Leukemia had a 2020 impact factor of 11.528.

In the 1990s, the journal has been accused of practicing coercive citation.
