= Sallie Holman =

Canadian opera singer

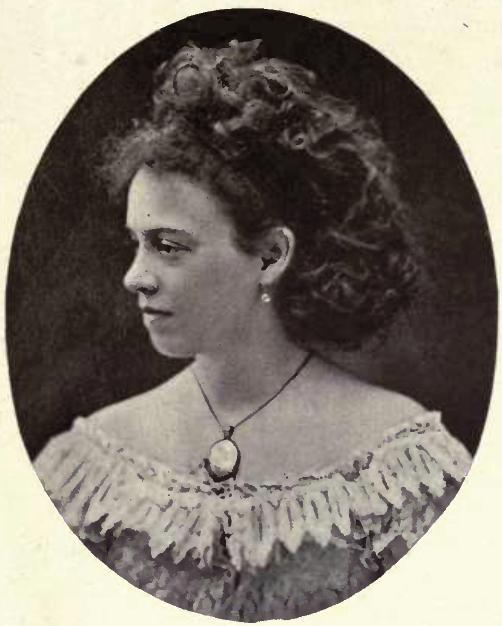

Background information
- Birth name: Sarah Holman
- Born: June 24, 1849; Lynn, Massachusetts
- Died: June 7, 1888 (aged 38); London, Ontario
- Genres: opera
- Years active: 1850s–1888
- Formerly of: Holman English Opera Troupe

Sallie Holman (June 24, 1849 – June 7, 1888) was a Canadian opera singer.

Born in Lynn, Massachusetts, she was the daughter of George W. Holman and Harriet Phillips, and was the principal singer in an English opera troupe, the Holman English Opera Troupe, formed by her father in the 1860s composed of her father, mother, and her siblings. The company toured the eastern United States and Canada from the late 1850s to the early 1880s. She married Mr. J.T. Dalton, a member of the company, in 1879.

She died on June 7, 1888.
