= Leukemia & Lymphoma Society of Canada =

Canadian charity

The Leukemia & Lymphoma Society is the world's largest voluntary health organization dedicated to funding blood cancer research and patient services.

== Mission ==
To cure leukemia, lymphoma, Hodgkin's disease and myeloma, and improve the quality of life of patients and their families.

== Canadian Chapters ==
There are five chapters in Canada, including Toronto, Montreal, Calgary, Vancouver and Halifax. Each chapter provides free patient services to those suffering from blood cancers, as well as manages fundraising campaigns such as Team in Training, Light The Night Walk and School & Youth Programs. The society also provides services to patients and their families through their Patient Services programs, and runs awareness campaigns through the School & Youth program.

In 2007, an estimated 4,200 Canadians will be diagnosed with leukemia; 7,680 with lymphoma and 2,000 with myeloma.

The Leukemia & Lymphoma Society of Canada was previously the Leukemia Research Fund of Canada.

== History of the LRF ==
In 1955, Anne Finkle's visited Detroit for a City of Hope Leukemia Fighters meeting. Upon her return to Toronto, she persuaded four other women to join her on a mission to California, where the City of Hope Hospital was located.

Following this mission, a Toronto chapter was set up and funds went directly to the hospital in California. The organization used blue boxes resembling the hospital to collect money around the city. On May 9, 1957, a provincial charter was issued to 14 women, as members of the newly incorporated City of Hope Leukemia Fighters. Anne Finkle was made president.

Eventually a Toronto hospital was selected to receive funding from the Toronto chapter. On December 22, 1965, the official change to Toronto Leukemia Fighters took place. In the same year, Mount Sinai Hospital was without a government grant for research into leukemia and related blood diseases. That year the Toronto chapter presented the hospital with a cheque for $2,000. Over the next ten years, more than $400,000 would be raised and donated resulting in the dedication of a new Research Laboratory at the hospital in honour of the Leukemia Research Fund. Some of the original members of the Toronto Leukemia fighters were Sarah Sokoloff, Ann Glickman, Greta Sonshine, Bessie Klotz.

The organization adopted the name of the Leukemia Research Fund on August 21, 1972. A similar organization existed in Toronto during the same time, Crusade Against Leukemia, and on June 30, 1983, it amalgamated with the LRF.

By 1990, there were several branches in Ontario, as well as one in Vancouver. In this same year the United Food and Commercial Workers Canada joined the team with an enormous fundraising boost. In 1991, four new branches were added: Edmonton, Leamington, Oshawa and North Bay.

In 1992, LRF became a federally registered charity.

On July 1, 2004, the LRF became affiliated with the Leukemia & Lymphoma Society, becoming the Leukemia and Lymphoma Society of Canada. Headquartered in Toronto, the LLSC has branches and volunteers across Canada.
