= Moshe Hammer =

Israeli-Canadian violinist

Moshe Hammer (Hebrew: משה המר; born on 29 March 1946) is an Israeli-Canadian violinist.

He was born in Budapest, raised in Israel, and became a Canadian citizen in the year 1975.

He studied at the Rubin Academy of Music at the University of Tel Aviv, with Ivan Galamian at the Juilliard School, with Jascha Heifetz in Los Angeles, United States, and with Yehudi Menuhin in London, England.

He won a medal in 1970 at the Thibaud Competition in Paris and performed as a soloist throughout North America, Europe, Israel, China, and South America.

He served as concertmaster of the Calgary Philharmonic, concertmaster of the Kitchener-Waterloo Symphony Orchestra, and principal violin of the Canadian Chamber Ensemble. He was also a founding member of the Amadeus Ensemble.

He taught at York University and has recording credits on several albums.

He is the founder and namesake of the non-profit organization The Hammer Band, a charity which provides violins and violin instruction to children living in at-risk communities in Toronto, Ontario, Canada.
