= Timothy Hutchins =

Canadian flutist

Timothy Hutchins is a Canadian classical flute player.

Principal flute of the Montreal Symphony Orchestra since 1978, Timothy Hutchins has received international critical acclaim for his work as a concerto soloist, as a recitalist, and as a chamber musician. He has appeared extensively as soloist with the OSM: notably with Charles Dutoit. Timothy Hutchins has appeared as guest principal with the Boston Symphony Orchestra with Seiji Ozawa, Vladimir Ashkenazy, and with Leonard Bernstein at the latter's last appearance, recording Beethoven’s Seventh Symphony at Tanglewood. As guest principal he has performed and toured with the New York Philharmonic under Zubin Mehta and Kurt Masur. He was principal flute of the Pittsburgh Symphony Orchestra for the 2003–04 season.

Soon after starting the flute Hutchins was playing in public concerts, on radio and TV. As a young competitor, at the age of eleven, he was already winning many first prizes and scholarships. In his early teens, Hutchins continued to win competitions both as a flutist and a recorder player. Playing the baroque flute, recorder and early music period instruments, took him to Salzburg, Siena and Germany. This led to his first LP record recording engagement, in 1970, with Swedish Radio in Stockholm, as well as a concert tour of Sweden.

Studying flute performance, Hutchins won the silver medal for the highest marks in the Licentiate Diploma in Flute Performance exams after one year of study at the Guildhall School of Music and Drama in London. He obtained his BA honours in Music at Dalhousie University in Nova Scotia and continued his flute education with Jeanne Baxstresser in MMus studies at McGill University.

In the spring of 1978 he won the Montreal Symphony Orchestra Principal flute position at age twenty three, two weeks before his McGill MMus final recital. His talents as first flute of the OSM were immediately appreciated by critics and audiences and this appreciation continues to this day.

Offered the Principal flute position of the New York Philharmonic, at the age of 28, and later the same position with the Boston and Pittsburgh Symphony Orchestras, where he was principal flute for the 2003 - 2004 season, Hutchins chose the unusual career step of declining these offers. This resulted in over 70 recordings with the OSM under Charles Dutoit and Kent Nagano, both as Principal flute and as soloist.

Hutchins can be heard in numerous other albums including concerto and chamber music recordings that have been very well received. His flute and piano album with pianist Janet Creaser entitled “Flute à la française” was described as “delectable” by the UK's Gramophone magazine.

Other notable recordings as Principal flute include three albums with the Boston Symphony Orchestra, under Seiji Ozawa, Vladimir Ashkenazy and Leonard Bernstein, and an album with the Pittsburgh Symphony Orchestra under Mariss Jansons. With the World Orchestra for Peace and Valery Gergiev, Hutchins has performed in London's televised BBC Proms concerts and these remarkable concerts are available on DVD.

Hutchins has a special relationship with the Far East. He has toured Japan many times, as well as performing in Korea and Hong Kong. He has been guest Principal flute and concerto soloist with Japan's renowned NHK Symphony Orchestra, and soloed in Kuala Lumpur with the Malaysian Philharmonic Orchestra.

Hutchins has been on faculty at the Pacific Music Festival in Sapporo, the Kirishima International Music Festival, and the Kobe International Flute Competition as a jury member and performer. In Tokyo he has given masterclasses, recitals and chamber performances on numerous visits.

Hutchins joined the flute faculty of McGill University in the autumn of 1978, attracting a long stream of outstanding flutists to McGill from across Canada, the US, Japan, China, the UK, Europe, Turkey, New Zealand and Israel.

He has given numerous masterclasses across Canada, in prominent US institutions such as Eastman, Peabody and the New World Symphony in Miami; at Oxford University and in London in addition to his work in Japan.

Throughout his career, Hutchins has mentored and guided many talented flutists, helping them develop and achieve their goals. His students include members of internationally known orchestras, and also those pursuing successful independent careers in music.
