= Citation cartel =

Group of academic authors who collude to cite one another's publications

A citation cartel is a group of academic authors who collude to cite one another's publications in order to artificially increase their citation impact. In many cases the cited works have no strong relevance to the works they are cited in. The practice of making excessive or spurious citations is known as citation stacking.

Mutual citation can occur naturally when small numbers of authors publish in a specialist field, but the term "citation cartel" is usually used to describe the situation where mutual citation is done without reasonable excuse. Because of the difficulty of proving intent, publishers are reluctant to use the term "citation cartel", but are known to deal with individual journals and authors when cartel-like behavior is suspected.

Alleged citation cartels have been found in numerous academic fields, including mathematics, medicine and dentistry. Possible citation cartels can be detected by network analysis of the citation graph.

Some citation cartels submit papers claiming to be from developing countries to avoid publication fees in open-access journals.

== See also ==
- Clique
- Coercive citation
