= Coercive citation =

Academic publishing practice

Coercive citation is an academic publishing practice in which an editor or referee of a scientific or academic journal forces an author to add spurious citations to an article before the journal will agree to publish it. This is done to inflate the journal's impact factor, thus artificially boosting the journal's scientific reputation. Manipulation of impact factors and self-citation has long been frowned upon in academic circles; however, the results of a 2012 survey indicate that about 20% of academics working in economics, sociology, psychology, and multiple business disciplines have experienced coercive citation. Individual cases have also been reported in other disciplines.

== Background ==
The impact factor (IF) of a journal is a measure of how often, on average, papers published in the journal are cited in other academic publications. The IF was devised in the 1950s as a simple way to rank scientific journals. Today, in some disciplines, the prestige of a publication is determined largely by its impact factor.

Use of the impact factor is not necessarily undesirable as it can reasonably incentivise editors to improve their journal through the publication of good science. Two well-known academic journals, Nature and Science, had impact factors of 36 and 31 respectively. A respected journal in a sub-field, such as cognitive science, might have an impact factor of around 3.

However, impact factors have also become a source of increasing controversy. As early as 1999, in a landmark essay Scientific Communication – A Vanity Fair?, Georg Franck criticized citation counts as creating a marketplace where "success in science is rewarded with attention". In particular, he warned of a future "shadow market" where journal editors might inflate citation counts by requiring spurious references. In 2005, an article in The Chronicle of Higher Education called it "the number that's devouring science".

== Definition ==
When an author submits a manuscript for publication in a scientific journal, the editor may request that the article's citations be expanded before it will be published. This is part of the standard peer review process and meant to improve the paper.

Coercive citation, on the other hand, is a specific unethical business practice in which the editor asks the author to add citations to papers published in the very same journal (self-citation) and in particular to cite papers that the author regards as duplicate or irrelevant. Specifically, the term refers to requests which:

- Give no indication that the manuscript was lacking proper citations
- Make no suggestion as to specific body of work requiring review
- Direct authors to add citations only from the editor's own journal

In one incident, which has been cited as a particularly blatant example of coercive citation, a journal editor wrote: "you cite Leukemia [once in 42 references]. Consequently, we kindly ask you to add references of articles published in Leukemia to your present article".

Such a request would convey a clear message to authors: "add citations or risk rejection."

The effect of coercive citation is to artificially increase the journal's impact factor. Self-citation can have an appreciable effect: for example, in a published analysis, one journal's impact factor dropped from 2.731 to 0.748 when the self-citations were removed from consideration. Not all self-citation is coercive or improper.

The practice of coercive citation is risky, as it may damage the reputation of the journal, and it hence has the potential of actually reducing the impact factor. Journals also risk temporary exclusion from Thomson Reuters' Journal Citation Reports, an influential list of impact factors, for such practices.

== Practice ==
In 2012, Wilhite and Fong published results of a comprehensive survey of 6,700 scientists and academics in economics, sociology, psychology, and multiple business disciplines. In this survey, respondents were asked whether, when submitting a manuscript to a journal, they had ever been asked by the editor to include spurious citations to other papers in the same journal. Their findings indicate that 1 in 5 respondents have experienced coercive citation incidents, and that 86% regard it as unethical.

A number of factors related to coercive citation have been identified. Coercion is significantly more prevalent in some academic disciplines than others. Wilhite and Fong found that "journals in the business disciplines" (such as marketing, management, or finance) "coerce more than economics journals", whereas coercion in psychology and sociology is "no more prevalent, or even less prevalent" than it is in economics. However, despite the differences in prevalence, they noted that "every discipline" in their study "reported multiple instances of coercion" and that "there are published references to coercion in fields beyond the social sciences." The business journal industry has responded that they intend to confront the practice more directly.

Wilhite and Fong also found that characteristics of publishers are correlated with coercion. In their findings, "journals published by commercial, for-profit companies show significantly greater use of coercive tactics than journals from university presses", and journals published by academic societies also showed a higher likelihood of coercion than journals from university presses. Five of the top ten offenders identified in their research came from the same commercial publishing house, Elsevier.

There may also be a correlation between journal ranking and coercive citation. Some have suggested that larger and more highly ranked journals have more valuable reputations at stake, and thus may be more reluctant to jeopardize their reputations by using the practice. However, Wilhite and Fong found that:

somewhat surprisingly, the results … suggest that more highly ranked journals are more likely to coerce … Focusing on the top 30 journals in each field tempers the results in a minor fashion, but the rank effect is still present and strong. Sadly, in the disciplines identified as practicing coercion, it is some of the most highly ranked journals that are leading the way … Our data cannot discern a direction of causality because some top journals may use coercion to maintain their position, whereas other journals may have attained their lofty position through coercion. But either situation is unsettling.

Commonalities have also been identified among the targets of coercion. Coercive citation is primarily targeted at younger researchers with less senior academic ranks and at papers with a smaller number of authors in order to have the greatest effect on the impact factor. It was also found that authors from non-English-speaking countries were more likely to be targeted.

== See also ==
- Impact factor § Questionable editorial policies that affect the impact factor
- Conflicts of interest in academic publishing § COIs of journals
- Goodhart's law

== See also ==
- Citation cartel
