= The Glenn Gould School =

Canadian music school

- Former name: The Royal Conservatory of Music Professional School
- Established: 1987
- President: Alexander Brose
- Dean: Barry Shiffman
- Academic staff: 85
- Administrative staff: 9
- Students: 130
- Location: 273 Bloor Street West; Toronto, Ontario, M5S 1W2, Canada; 43.66793°N 79.39656°W
- Campus: Urban
- Website: www.rcmusic.com/ggs/

The Glenn Gould School is an elite institution for the training of professional musicians in performance at post-secondary and post-bachelor levels in Toronto, Ontario, Canada. The school was founded in 1987 and renamed in 1997 after the pianist Glenn Gould who was born and lived in Toronto and was an alumnus of The Royal Conservatory of Music there. It is considered one of the top music conservatories in the world. The school is located in the facilities of The Royal Conservatory of Music and is in the Yorkville neighbourhood of Downtown Toronto. It is located adjacent to the Royal Ontario Museum and near the University of Toronto.

== Origin ==
The school was founded in 1987 as The Royal Conservatory of Music Professional School by The Royal Conservatory of Music in Toronto. The school was renamed on 1 January 1997 to The Glenn Gould School "to honour one of the greatest musical minds in history".
