= Juno Award for Classical Album of the Year – Large Ensemble =

Canadian music award

The Juno Award for "Classical Album of the Year" for ensembles has been awarded since 1985 (under four award headings), as recognition each year for the best classical music album in Canada.

It was a split from the prior category for Juno Award for Classical Album of the Year, alongside a separate new category for Classical Album of the Year – Solo or Chamber Ensemble.

== Winners ==
=== Best Classical Album: Large Ensemble or Soloist(s) With Large Ensemble Accompaniment (1985–1987) ===
Year	Winner(s)	Album	Nominees	Ref.
1985	Montreal Symphony Orchestra, Charles Dutoit – Conductor	Ravel: Ma Mere L'oye/Pavane Pour un Infante Debunte/Tombeau de Couperin And Valses Nobles et Sentimentales	Berlioz: Symphonie Fantastique — Montreal Symphony Orchestra, Charles Dutoit conductor; The Brandenburg Concertos — CBC Vancouver Orchestra, Mario Bernardi conductor; Serenade in Harmony — Elmer Iseler; Stravinsky: Le Sacre du Printemps — Montreal Symphony Orchestra, Charles Dutoit conductor	
1986	Toronto Symphony, Andrew Davis – Conductor	Holst: The Planets	Franck: Symphony in D Minor & Berlioz: King Lear — Vancouver Symphony Orchestra, Kazuyoshi Akiyama conductor; Great Verdi Arias — Edmonton Symphony Orchestra, Uri Mayer conductor, Louis Quilico baritone; Schubert: Symphony No. 8 & Strauss: Metamorphosen — National Arts Centre Orchestra, Franco Mannino conductor; Suppe: Overtures — Montreal Symphony Orchestra, Charles Dutoit conductor	
1987	Montreal Symphony Orchestra, Charles Dutoit – Conductor	Holst, The Planets	Beethoven, Piano Concertos – Toronto Symphony, Anton Kuerti; Berlioz: Romeo et Juliette – Montreal Symphony Orchestra, Charles Dutoit (conductor); Stravinsky, The Firebird – Montreal Symphony Orchestra, Charles Dutoit (conductor); Tchaikovsky: 1812 Overture, Capriccio Italien, March Slave, Nutcracker Suite – Montreal Symphony Orchestra, Charles Dutoit, (conductor)	

=== Best Classical Album (Large Ensemble) (1989–1999) ===
Year	Winner(s)	Album	Nominees	Ref.
1989	Montreal Symphony Orchestra, Charles Dutoit – Conductor	Bartók: Concerto for Orchestra; Music For Strings, Percussion and Celesta	Berlioz: Harold in Italy, Rob Roy and Corsaire Overtures — Montreal Symphony Orchestra, Charles Dutoit conductor; Fauro: Requiem — Montreal Symphony Orchestra, Charles Dutoit conductor; Handel: Messiah — Toronto Symphony Orchestra, Andrew Davis conductor; Mussorgsky: Pictures at an Exhibition, Night on Bare Mountain — Montreal Symphony Orchestra, Charles Dutoit conductor	
1990	Tafelmusik Baroque Orchestra	Boccherini: Cello Concertos and Symphonies	Fête à la Français — Montreal Symphony Orchestra, conductor Charles Dutoit; Gershwin: Rhapsody in Blue, An American in Paris — Montreal Symphony Orchestra, conductor Charles Dutoit, piano Louis Lortie; Haydn Symphonies No. 1 and 5 — National Arts Centre Orchestra, conductor Gabriel Chmura; Prokofiev: Symphonies Nos. 1 and 5 — Montreal Symphony Orchestra, conductor Charles Dutoit	
1991	Montreal Symphony Orchestra, Charles Dutoit – Conductor	Debussy: Images, Nocturnes	Debussy la mer, Jeux, Prélude a l'apres-midi d'un faune — Montreal Symphony Orchestra, conductor Charles Dutoit; Music on Hebrew Themes — I Musici de Montréal Chamber Orchestra, conductor Yull Turovsky; Ravel Piano Concertos — Louis Lortie piano and London Symphony Orchestra; Schumann Symphony No. 3 and Konzertstück — Calgary Philharmonic Orchestra, conductor Mario Bernardi; Zelenka Missa del Filii — Tafelmusik Orchestra	
1992	Montreal Symphony Orchestra, Charles Dutoit – Conductor	Debussy: Pelleas et Melisande	Bloch: Schelomo and Bruch Koi Nidrel — Ofra Harnoy; Mozart: German Dances — Tafelmusik; Mozart: Overtures — Tafelmusik; Mozart: Six Symphonies After Serenades — Tafelmusik	
1993	Tafelmusik Baroque Orchestra, with Alan Curtis, Catherine Robbin, Linda Maguire, Nancy Argenta, Ingrid Attrot, Mel Braun and Jeanne Lamon	Handel: Excerpts From Floridante	Haydn: Sumphonies Nos. 44, 51 and 52 — Tafelmusik with Bruno Wolf, leader Jeanne Lamon; Prokofiev: Alexander Novsky and Lieutenant Kike — Montreal Symphony Orchestra, conductor Charles Dutoit; Schumann and Chopin: Piano Concertos —Louis Lortie, the Philharmonia with Neeme Järvi; Tchaikovsky: Swan Lake — Montreal Symphony Orchestra, conductor Charles Dutoit	
1994	Tafelmusik Baroque Orchestra, Jeanne Lamon – Director	Handel: Concerti Grossi, Op.3 No. 1-6	Barok: The Miraculous Mandarin — Montreal Symphony Orchestra; Gluck: Ballet Pantomimes — Tafelmusik; Rachmaninoff: Piano Concerto No. 4 — Arthur Ozolins, Toronto Symphony Orchestra; Stravinsky, Szymanowski: Violin Concertos — Chantal Juillet and Montreal Symphony Orchestra	
1995	Tafelmusik Baroque Orchestra, Jeanne Lamon – Director	Bach: Brandenburg Concertos Nos. 1–6	Ibert: Escales, Flute Concerto — Timothy Hutchins, Montreal Symphony Orchestra, conductor Charles Dutoit; Shostakovich: Symphonies 1 and 15 — Montreal Symphony Orchestra, conductor Charles Dutoit; Stravinsky: Apollon Musagete — Montreal Symphony Orchestra, conductor Charles Dutoit; The Romantic Piano Concerto Vol. 7 - Henselt and Alkan, piano Marc-André Hamelin, BBC Scottish Symphony Orchestra, conductor Martyn Brabbins	
1996	Montreal Symphony Orchestra, Charles Dutoit – Conductor	Shostakovich: Symphonies 5 & 9	Debussy: Children's Corner — Montreal Symphony Orchestra; Mendelssohn: Symphonies 1 and 5, Hebrides Overture — Calgary Philharmonic Orchestra; Purcell: Ayres for the Theatre — Tafelmusik; Tchaikovsky and Sibelius: Violin Concertos — Leila Josefowicz, The Academy of St. Martin in the Fields	
1997	I Musici de Montréal	Ginastera/Villa-Lobos/Evangelista	Handel: Water Music — Tafelmusik, musical director Jeanne Lamon; Kodaly: Hary Janos, Peacock Variations — Montreal Symphony Orchestra, conductor Charles Dutoit; Mussrogsky: Pictures of an Exhibition — Toronto Symphony Orchestra, conductor Jukka-Pekka Saraste; Ravel: The Piano Concertos — Montreal Symphony Orchestra, conductor Charles Dutoit, soloist Jean-Yves Thibaudet	
1998	James Sommerville; CBC Vancouver Orchestra; Mario Bernardi	Mozart Horn Concertos	Carnaval Romain — Montreal Symphony Orchestra, conductor Charles Dutoit; Bizet: Symphony in C — Montreal Symphony Orchestra, conductor Charles Dutoit; Tabuh-Tabuhan, Music of Colin McPhee — Esprit Orchestra, Alex Pauk; Rachmaninov: Piano Concerto No. 4 — Toronto Symphony Orchestra, conductor Jukka-Pekka Saraste, piano Alexei Lubimov, Toronto Mendelssohn Choir	
1999	Tafelmusik Baroque Orchestra, Jeanne Lamon – musical director	Handel: Music for the Royal Fireworks	Bartok: Dance Suite, Music for Strings — Toronto Symphony Orchestra; Reverie et Caprice: Violin Romances — Chantal Juillet, Montreal Symphony Orchestra; Saint-Saëens - Fauré - Roussel — Stéphane Lemelin, CBC Vancouver Orchestra; Schnittke, Part, Gorecki — I Musici de Montreal	

=== Best Classical Album: Large Ensemble or Soloist(s) With Large Ensemble Accompaniment (2000–2002) ===
Year	Winner(s)	Album	Nominees	Ref.
2000	Montreal Symphony Orchestra	Respighi: La Boutique Fantasque	Brahms: Two Piano Concertos – Anton Kuerti, Orchestre Métropolitain; Handel: Arias and Dances – Excerpts from Agrippina and Alcina – Tafelmusik, Karina Gauvin; Nights in the Gardens of Spain – Angela Cheng, Hans Graf, Calgary Philharmonic Orchestra; Vivaldi: Concerti for Strings – Les Violons du Roy	
2001	Toronto Symphony Orchestra with Jukka-Pekka Saraste	Sibelius: Lemminkäinen Suite – Night Ride and Sunrise	Chausson: Poeme — Chantal Juillet, Montreal Symphony Orchestra, conductor Charles Dutoit; Henry Dutilleux: Orchestral Works — Toronto Symphony Orchestra, conductor Jukka-Pekka Saraste; Liszt: Piano Concerti — Janina Fialkowska, Calgary Philharmonic Orchestra; Mendelssohn, Glazunov: Violin Concertos — Leila Josefowicz, Montreal Symphony Orchestra, conductor Charles Dutoit; Telemann: Orchestral Suites, Tafelmusik Baroque Orchestra	
2002	James Ehnes (violin), Montreal Symphony Orchestra, Charles Dutoit (conductor)	Max Bruch, Concertos 1 & 3	Concert Français — James Ehnes (violin), Orchestre Symphonique de Québec; English Piano Concerti: Britten, Rawsthorne, Ireland, Finzi — Jane Coop (piano), CBC Radio Orchestra; J.S. Bach: Art of the Fugue — Les Violons du Roy; Myaskovsky - Schinittke - Denisov — Stepan Arman (violin), I Musici de Montreal	

=== Classical Album of the Year: Large Ensemble or Soloist(s) With Large Ensemble Accompaniment (2003 – Present) ===
Year	Winner(s)	Album	Nominees	Ref.
2003	James Ehnes and Mario Bernardi with the Montreal Symphony Orchestra	Bruch Concertos: Vol II	Angela Cheng, Mario Bernardi and the CBC Radio Orchestra, The Overcoat: Music By Dmitri Shostakovich; Anton Kuerti, Mario Bernardi and the CBC Radio Orchestra, Schumann Piano Works; I Musici de Montreal, Nocturnal Dances of Don Juan Quixote, Tafelmusik, A Baroque Feast	
2004	André Laplante (piano), Christopher Millard (bassoon), Robert Cram (flute), Joaquin Valdepenas (clarinet), CBC Radio Orchestra, Mario Bernardi – conductor	Concertos: Music of Jacques Hétu	Alain Lefèvre and the Quebec Symphony Orchestra, Concertos: Matthieu, Addinsell, Gershwin; Tafelmusik Baroque Orchestra with Jeanne Lamon, Mozart Noir; Yannick Nézet-Séguin with the Orchestra Métropolitain, Nino Rota: La Strada	
2004	Tafelmusik Baroque Orchestra	Bach Orchestral Suites	Alain Lefèvre and the Quebec Symphony Orchestra, Concertos: Matthieu, Addinsell, Gershwin; Tafelmusik Baroque Orchestra with Jeanne Lamon, Mozart Noir; Yannick Nézet-Séguin with the Orchestra Métropolitain, Nino Rota: La Strada	
2005	Jeanne Lamon, Tafelmusik Baroque Orchestra	Dardanus/Le temple de la gloire: Music of Jean-Phillippe Rameau	Bramwell Tovey and the Vancouver Symphony Orchestra, Borodin; Mario Bernardi and the Edmonton Symphony Orchestra, Frenergy: Music of John Estacio; James Ehnes and the London Mozart Players, Hummel; Yannick Nézet-Séguin and the Orchestre Metropolitain du Grand Montreal, Mahler: Symphony No. 4	
2006	Tafelmusik Baroque Orchestra, Bruno Weil	Beethoven: Symphonies nos. 5 et 6	Angela Hewitt and the Australian Chamber Orchestra with Richard Tognetti, J.S. Bach: Keyboard Concertos Vol. 1; Tafelmusik Baroque Orchestra with Jeanne Lamon, Concerti Virtuosi, Alexandre Da Costa and the Extremadura Symphony Orchestra with Jesús Amigo, Freitas Branco: Violin Concerto; Arion Ensemble with Jaap ter Linden, Telemann: Tutti flauti!	
2007	James Ehnes and the Mozart Anniversary Orchestra	Mozart: Violin Concerti	Jon Kimura Parker/James Parker/Ian Parker/CBC Radio Orchestra/Mario Bernardi, Mozart: Violin Concerti; Alain Lefèvre and the Montreal Symphony Orchestra, Rhapsodies; Philippe Bélanger/Orchestre Métropolitain/Yannick Nézet-Séguin, Saint-Saëns: Symphony No. 3 "Organ"; I Musici de Montréal, Shostakovich's Circle	
2008	James Ehnes/Bramwell Tovey/Vancouver Symphony Orchestra	Korngold, Barber & Walton Violin Concertos	James Ehnes, Andrew Davis and the Philharmonia Orchestra, Elgar Violin Concertos; Orchestre Métropolitain and Yannick Nézet-Séguin, La Mer; Tafelmusik Baroque Orchestra, Vivaldi: L’estro armonico; Les Violons du Roy, Water Music	
2009	Montreal Symphony Orchestra/Kent Nagano	Beethoven: Ideals of the French Revolution	Orchestre symphonique de Québec and Yoav Talmi, Bach: Métamorphoses; Orchestre Métropolitain and Yannick Nézet-Séguin, Bruckner: Symphonie No 9; Tafelmusik and Bruno Weil, Beethoven: Symphonies Nos. 7 & 8; Toronto Chamber Orchestra and Kevin Mallon, Haydn: Symphonies 62, 107 & 108	
2010	Alain Lefèvre/London Mozart Players	Mathieu, Shostakovich, Mendelssohn: Concertino & Concertos	Louis Lortie and Orchestre symphonique de Québec, Mendelssohn – Piano Concertos 1 & 2 – Symphony No. 5; National Youth Orchestra of Canada, Selections from the 2009 National Tour; Yannick Nézet-Séguin & Orchestre Métropolitain, Bruckner 8; Les Violons du Roy, Bartók	
2011	Scott St. John/Lara St. John	Mozart: Scott and Lara St. John/The Knights	Angèle Dubeau and La Pietà, Arvo Pärt: Portrait; James Ehnes, James Ehnes Plays Mendelssohn; Janina Fialkowska and Vancouver Symphony Orchestra under Bramwell Tovey, Chopin Piano Concertos; Les Violons du Roy under Bernard Labadie, Bonbons (album)|Bonbons	
2012	Alexandre Da Costa/Montreal Symphony Orchestra	Daugherty: Fire and Blood	James Ehnes, Bartók Violin Concertos; Yannick Nézet-Séguin with the Orchestre Métropolitain, Bruckner 4; Yannick Nézet-Séguin with the Orchestre Métropolitain, Florent Schmidt: La tragédie de Salomé; Jean-Guihen Queyras, Vivaldi Cello Concertos	
2013	James Ehnes	Tchaikovsky: Violin Concerto	Jan Lisiecki, Mozart: Piano Concertos Nos. 20 & 21; Antonio Peruch, Edmonton Symphony Orchestra, Logos Futura; Tafelmusik Baroque Orchestra, The Galileo Project; Bramwell Tovey/Vancouver Symphony Orchestra, Fugitive Colours	
2014	James Ehnes	Britten & Shostakovich: Violin Concerti	Angela Hewitt, Mozart: Piano Concertos Nos. 17 & 27; Nadina Mackie Jackson and Guy Few with Group of 27, Canadian Concerto Project, Volume One; Tafelmusik Baroque Orchestra, House of Dreams; Toronto Symphony Orchestra, Rachmaninoff: Symphonic Dances & Stravinsky: The Rite of Spring	
2015	Angela Hewitt	MOZART: Piano Concertos Nos. 22 & 24	James Ehnes, Khachaturian/Shostakovich; Montreal Symphony Orchestra & Kent Nagano, Beethoven: Symphonies Nos. 1 & 7, Departure - Utopia; Toronto Symphony Orchestra, Peter Oundjian, Rimsky-Korsakov: Sheherazade; Yannick Nézet-Séguin & Orchestre Métropolitain, Bruckner 3	
2016	Montreal Symphony Orchestra with Olivier Latry and Jean-Willy Kunz	Symphony and New Works for Organ and Orchestra	James Ehnes with the Sydney Symphony, Vivaldi: Four Seasons; Orchestre Métropolitain, Mahler 10; Paul Merkelo, Montreal Symphony Orchestra, Tomasi, Desenclos, Jolivet: French Trumpet Concertos; Stewart Goodyear with the Czech National Symphony, Rachmaninov: Piano Concertos 2 & 3	
2017	Steve Wood and the Northern Cree Singers, Tanya Tagaq, Winnipeg Symphony Orchestra	Going Home Star: Truth and Reconciliation	Tafelmusik Baroque Orchestra and Chamber Choir, Beethoven Symphony No. 9; Louis Lortie, Hélène Mercier, BBC Philharmonic, Poulenc: Piano Concertos & Aubade; Jan Lisiecki, Orchestra dell'Accademia Nazionale di Santa Cecilia, Schumann; Les Violons du Roy & Mathieu Lussier, Vivaldi: Concertos	
2018	Jan Lisiecki with NDR Elbphilharmonie Orchestra	Chopin: Works for Piano & Orchestra	Arion Orchestre Baroque, Rebelles Baroques; James Ehnes with Royal Liverpool Philharmonic, Beethoven & Schubert: Violin Concerto; Johannes Moser with Orchestre de la Suisse Romande, Elgar & Tchaikovsky; Winnipeg Symphony Orchestra with Nunavut Sivuniksavut, The Shaman & Arctic Symphony	
2019	Toronto Symphony Orchestra conducted by Peter Oundjian feat. Louis Lortie, Sarah Jeffrey and Teng Li	Vaughan Williams	National Arts Centre Orchestra conducted by Alexander Shelley, New Worlds/Nouveaux Mondes; James Ehnes with Seattle Symphony and Detroit Symphony Orchestra, Newton Howard & Kernis: Violin Concertos; Tovey: Stream of Limelight; Louis Lortie with BBC Philharmonic, Saint-Saëns: Piano Concertos Nos. 1, 2 and 4; Thunder Bay Symphony Orchestra conducted by Arthur Post with Gryphon Trio, Into the Wonder	
2020	Montreal Symphony Orchestra conducted by Kent Nagano	The John Adams Album	National Arts Centre Orchestra conducted by Alexander Shelley, The Bound of our Dreams; Jan Lisiecki with Academy of St. Martin in the Fields, Beethoven: Complete Piano Concertos; Orchestre Métropolitain de Montreal conducted by Yannick Nezet-Seguin, Sibelius 1; Montreal Symphony Orchestra conducted by Kent Nagano feat. Charles Richard-Hamelin, Chopin: Concertos Nos. 1 & 2	
2021	Montreal Symphony Orchestra conducted by Kent Nagano feat. Andrew Wan	Ginastera - Bernstein - Moussa: Œuvres pour violon et orchestre/Works for Violin and Orchestra	Les Violons du Roy conducted by Jonathan Cohen feat. Charles Richard-Hamelin, Mozart: Concertos pour piano/Piano Concertos Nos. 22 & 24; Louis Lortie with BBC Philharmonic conducted by Edward Gardner, Saint-Saëns: Piano Concertos Nos. 3, 5, & Other Works; Laval Symphony Orchestra conducted by Alain Trudel feat. Jean-Philippe Sylvestre, Jacques Hétu: Concertos; Montreal Symphony Orchestra with Kraków Philharmonic Choir and Warsaw Boys' Choir conducted by Kent Nagano, Penderecki: St. Luke Passion	
2022	L'Harmonie des saisons conducted by Eric Milnes ft. Hélène Brunet	Solfeggio	Against the Grain Theatre with the Toronto Symphony Orchestra conducted by Johannes Debus, Messiah/Complex; Orchestre Métropolitain de Montréal conducted by Yannick Nézet-Séguin, Sibelius 3; Studio de musique ancienne de Montréal conducted by Andrew McAnerney, L'Homme armé; The Philadelphia Orchestra conducted by Yannick Nézet-Séguin, Rachmaninoff: Symphony No. 1 & Symphonic Dances	
2023	Orchestre de l'Agora conducted by Nicolas Ellis featuring Marina Thibeault	Viola Borealis	The Elora Singers conducted by Mark Vuorinen, Radiant Dawn: Music for Advent and Christmas; Ensemble Vocal Arts-Quebec conducted by Matthias Maute featuring Karina Gauvin, Handel: Messiah, HWV 56, Ensemble Caprice; I Musici de Montréal conducted by Jean-Marie Zeitouni, Richard Strauss: Metamorphosen – Arvo Pärt: Symphonie No. 4 Los Angeles; National Arts Centre Orchestra conducted by Alexander Shelley, Clara – Robert – Johannes: Lyrical Echoes	
2024	Orchestre classique de Montréal conducted by Jacques Lacombe	Maxime Goulet: Symphonie de la tempête de verglas	Cryptid Ensemble conducted by Brian Current, Bekah Simms: Bestiaries; Montreal Symphony Orchestra conducted by Rafael Payare, Mahler: Symphony No. 5; Orchestre Métropolitain conducted by Yannick Nézet-Séguin, Sibelius 3 & 4; The Philadelphia Orchestra conducted by Yannick Nézet-Séguin, Rachmaninoff: Symphonies Nos. 2 & 3; Isle of the Dead	
2025	Toronto Symphony Orchestra conducted by Gustavo Gimeno featuring Marc-André Hamelin and Nathalie Forget	Messiaen: Turangalîla-Symphonie	Mark Fewer featuring Aiyun Huang, Deantha Edmunds and Mark Fewer, Alikeness, Newfoundland Symphony Orchestra Sinfonia; Luminous Voices, Ispiciwin; Orchestre Métropolitain conducted by Yannick Nézet-Séguin, Sibelius 2 & 5; Montreal Symphony Orchestra conducted by Rafael Payare, Schoenberg: Pelleas und Melisande & Verklärte Nacht	
2026	Axios Men’s Ensemble, the Tenors and Basses of Pro Coro Canada conducted by Michael Zaugg featuring John Tessier and Yuliia Zasimova	Benedict Sheehan: Ukrainian War Requiem	Canadian Chamber Choir featuring Sherryl Sewepagaham, Where Waters Meet; Les Violons du Roy conducted by Airat Ichmouratov featuring Elvira Misbakhova and Stéphane Tétreault, Ichmouratov: The Ninth Wave, Viola Concerto No. 2, Cello Concerto No. 1; Tafelmusik conducted by Rachel Podger, Haydn: Symphony No. 43 in E-Flat Major, Hob. I:43 "Mercury" & Symphony No. 49 in F Minor, Hob. I:49 "La passione"; Toronto Symphony Orchestra conducted by Gustavo Gimeno, Stravinsky: Pulcinella, Le Baiser de la fée (Divertimento)	
