= Juno Awards of 1991 =

Canadian music awards ceremony

- Date: 3 March 1991
- Venue: Queen Elizabeth Theatre, Vancouver, British Columbia
- Hosted by: Paul Shaffer

Television/radio coverage
- Network: CBC

The Juno Awards of 1991, representing Canadian music industry achievements of the previous year, were awarded on 3 March 1991 in Vancouver, British Columbia at a ceremony in the Queen Elizabeth Theatre. Paul Shaffer was the host for the ceremonies, which were broadcast on CBC Television.

This was the first time the award ceremonies were hosted away from Toronto. A category for rap music also made its debut at these 1991 awards.

== Nominees and winners ==
=== Canadian Entertainer of the Year ===
Winner: The Tragically Hip

Other Nominees:

- The Jeff Healey Band
- Colin James
- Kim Mitchell
- Alannah Myles

=== Best Female Vocalist ===
Winner: Celine Dion

Other Nominees:

- Lee Aaron
- Rita MacNeil
- Anne Murray
- Candy Pennella

=== Best Male Vocalist ===
Winner: Colin James

Other Nominees:

- Gowan
- Paul Janz
- Maestro Fresh-Wes
- Neil Young

=== Most Promising Female Vocalist ===
Winner: Sue Medley

Other Nominees:

- Jane Child
- Holly Cole
- Patricia Conroy
- Mae Moore
- Lorraine Segato

=== Most Promising Male Vocalist ===
Winner: Andy Curran

Other Nominees:

- Danny Brooks
- John James
- Kenny MacLean
- Francis Martin
- Bob Wiseman

=== Group of the Year ===
Winner: Blue Rodeo

Other Nominees:

- Cowboy Junkies
- The Jeff Healey Band
- The Northern Pikes
- Rush

=== Most Promising Group ===
Winner: Leslie Spit Treeo

Other Nominees:

- Bootsauce
- Crash Vegas
- National Velvet
- Spirit of the West

=== Songwriter of the Year ===
Winner: David Tyson

Other Nominees:

- Jane Child
- Leonard Cohen
- Jim Cuddy and Greg Keelor
- Daniel Lanois
- Eddie Schwartz

=== Best Country Female Vocalist ===
Winner: Rita MacNeil

Other Nominees:

- Carroll Baker
- Patricia Conroy
- Anne Murray
- Michelle Wright

=== Best Country Male Vocalist ===
Winner: George Fox

Other Nominees:

- Tommy Hunter
- David Hutchins
- Larry Mercey
- Tim Taylor

=== Best Country Group or Duo ===
Winner: Prairie Oyster

Other Nominees:

- The Good Brothers
- Colleen Peterson and Gilles Godard
- Kimberley Richards and J.K. Gulley
- Sylvia Tyson and Tom Russell

=== Best Instrumental Artist ===
Winner: Ofra Harnoy

Other Nominees:

- Exchange
- Michael Jones
- Moe Koffman
- Ian Tamblyn

=== International Entertainer of the Year ===
Winner: The Rolling Stones

Other Nominees:

- Aerosmith
- Phil Collins
- Madonna
- Sinéad O'Connor

=== Best Producer ===
Winner: David Tyson, Baby, It's Tonight; Don't Hold Back Your Love

Other Nominees:

- Jane Child
- Bruce Fairbairn
- David Foster
- Declan O'Doherty
- Gino Vannelli and Joe Vannelli

=== Best Recording Engineer ===
Winner: Gino/Joe Vannelli, The Time Of Day; Sunset On LA

Other Nominees:

- Kevin Doyle
- Noel Golden
- Tom Henderson and Peter Moore
- Fraser Hill and Rick Hutt
- Mike Jones

=== Canadian Music Hall of Fame ===
Winner: Leonard Cohen

=== Walt Grealis Special Achievement Award ===
Winner: Mel Shaw, CARAS founder

== Nominated and winning albums ==
=== Best Album ===
Winner: Unison, Celine Dion

Other Nominees:

- Bodyrock, Lee Aaron
- Les B.B., Les B.B.
- Hell to Pay, The Jeff Healey Band
- Home I'll Be, Rita MacNeil

=== Best Children's Album ===
Winner: Mozart's Magic Fantasy, Susan Hammond

Other Nominees:

- Une voix pour les enfants (A Voice for the Children), Carmen Campagne
- Yes I Can, Sandra Beech
- The Season - A Family Christmas Celebration, Fred Penner
- Sing A to Z, Sharon, Lois and Bram

=== Best Classical Album (Solo or Chamber Ensemble) ===
Winner: R. Murray Schafer: Five String Quartets, The Orford String Quartet

Other Nominees:

- Beethoven: 15 Variations and Fugue and Other Works, Louis Lortie
- Beethoven Quartets Volume II, IV, V, The Orford String Quartet
- Mozart Piano Quartets, Jane Coop and members of The Orford String Quartet
- 20th Century Guitar Works, Norbert Kraft

=== Best Classical Album (Large Ensemble) ===
Winner: Debussy: Images, Nocturnes, Montreal Symphony Orchestra, conductor Charles Dutoit

Other Nominees:

- Debussy la mer, Jeux, Prélude a l'apres-midi d'un faune, Montreal Symphony Orchestra, conductor Charles Dutoit
- Music on Hebrew Themes, I Musici de Montréal Chamber Orchestra, conductor Yull Turovsky
- Ravel Piano Concertos, Louis Lortie piano and London Symphony Orchestra
- Schumann Symphony No. 3 and Konzertstück, Calgary Philharmonic Orchestra, conductor Mario Bernardi
- Zelenka Missa del Filii, Tafelmusik Orchestra

=== Best Album Design ===
Winner: Robert Lebeuf, Sue Medley by Sue Medley

Other Nominees:

- François Blais, Motion by Motion
- John W. Stewart, The Brown Album by Bootsauce
- Hugh Syme, Snow in June by The Northern Pikes
- Hugh Syme, Oceanview Motel by Mae Moore

=== International Album of the Year ===
Winner: Please Hammer Don't Hurt 'Em, MC Hammer

Other Nominees:

- AC/DC, The Razors Edge
- Phil Collins, ...But Seriously
- New Kids on the Block, Step by Step
- Sinéad O'Connor, I Do Not Want What I Haven't Got

=== Best Jazz Album ===
Winner: Two Sides, Mike Murley

Other Nominees:

- The Dave McMurdo Jazz Orchestra, Dave McMurdo
- Oscar Peterson Live, Oscar Peterson
- Renee Rosnes, Renee Rosnes
- Time Warp Live at George's Jazz Room, Time Warp

=== Best Hard Rock/Metal Album ===
Winner: Presto, Rush

Other Nominees:

- Andy Curran, Andy Curran
- Bodyrock, Lee Aaron
- Dirty Weapons, Killer Dwarfs
- Nothingface, Voivod

=== Best Roots & Traditional Album ===
Winner: Dance and Celebrate by Bill Bourne and Alan MacLeod

Other Nominees:

- Acoustic Blues, Jackson Delta
- Jubilation III - Glory Train, Montreal Jubilation Gospel Choir
- One Job Town, Grievous Angels
- Weather Out the Storm, Figgy Duff

== Nominated and winning releases ==
=== Single of the Year ===
Winner: "Just Came Back", Colin James

Other Nominees:

- "Let Your Backbone Slide", Maestro Fresh-Wes
- "More Than Words Can Say", Alias
- "She Ain't Pretty", The Northern Pikes
- "So Listen", MCJ and Cool G

=== Best Classical Composition ===
Winner: String Quartet No.5 - 'Rosalind', R. Murray Schafer

Other Nominees:

- Aviravirmayedhi, Glenn Buhr
- Cappriccio-Concertante, Sophie-Carmen Eckhardt-Gramatté
- Chaconne, Michael Colgrass
- La Cri de Merlin, R. Murray Schafer

=== Best Dance Recording ===
Winner: "Don't Wanna Fall In Love" (Knife Feel Good Mix), Jane Child

Other Nominees:

- The World Keeps on Turning, Candi & The Backbeat
- Unison, Celine Dion
- I Wanna Know, John James
- Puss 'n Boots (These Boots are Made for Walkin', Kon Kan

=== International Single of the Year ===
Winner: "Vogue", Madonna

Other Nominees:

- "Back to Life (However Do You Want Me)", Soul II Soul
- "Lambada", Kaoma
- "Step by Step", New Kids on the Block
- "Unskinny Bop", Poison

=== Best R&B/Soul Recording ===
Winner: Dance to the Music (Work Your Body), Simply Majestic featuring B. Kool

Other Nominees:

- Can't Repress the Cause, Dance Appeal
- So Listen, MCJ and Cool G
- Jamaican Funk, Michie Mee and L.A. Luv
- Take Me Like I Am, Spunkadelic

=== Rap Recording of the Year ===
Winner: Symphony in Effect by Maestro Fresh-Wes

Other Nominees:

- Dance to the Music, Simply Majestic with B-Kool
- So Listen, MCJ and Cool G
- Take Me Like I Am, Spunkadelic
- Wash Your Face in My Sink, Dream Warriors

=== Best Reggae/Calypso Recording ===
Winner: Soldiers We Are All, Jayson & Friends

Other Nominees:

- Broken Arrow, Mojah
- Eyes Like Fire, Leroy Sibbles
- Rock and Sway, Messenjah
- Wild Jockey, Jackie Mittoo

=== Best Video ===
Winner: Joel Goldberg, "Drop The Needle" by Maestro Fresh-Wes

Other Nominees:

- Don Allan, "I Am a Wild Party" by Kim Mitchell
- Don Allan, "I Wanna Know" by John James
- Ron Berti, "She Ain't Pretty" by The Northern Pikes
- Joel Goldberg, "Let Your Backbone Slide" by Maestro Fresh-Wes
