= Juno Award for Classical Album of the Year =

Annual award for the best classical music album in Canada

The Juno Award for Classical Album of the Year was introduced in 1977, as recognition each year for the best classical music album in Canada. It was presented until the Juno Awards of 1985, when it was split into separate awards for Large Ensemble and Solo or Chamber Ensemble.

== Winners and nominees ==
Year	Winner(s)	Album	Nominees	Ref.
1977	Anton Kuerti	Beethoven - Vols. 1,2,& 3	Franck and Ravel — Hidetaro Suzuki & Zeyda Ruga-Suzuki; Franz Schubert & Johannes Brahms — Gisela Depkat; Liona — Liona Boyd; Plays J.S. Bach — Pierre Grandmaison	
1978	Toronto Symphony Orchestra	Three Borodin Symphonies	Mendelssoh Quartets Op. 12 & 13 — Orford String Quartet; Staryk Plays Kreisler — Steven Staryk and Jane Corwin; To Syngen & Pleye — The Toronto Consort	
1979	Glenn Gould/Roxolana Roslak	Hindemith; Das Marienleben	A Baroque Bouquet — Toronto Baroque Trio; First Lady of the Guitar — Liona Boyd; Janacek Taras Bulba — Toronto Symphony Orchestra, Andrew Davis; The Orford String Quartet — Orford String Quartet	
1980	Judy Loman/R. Murray Schafer	The Crown of Ariadne	Loving — Kathy Terrell, Jean MacPhail, Susan Gudgeon, Mary Lou Fallis, Chamber Orchestra, Robert Aitken (conductor); The Nutcracker Suite — Toronto Symphony Orchestra, Andrew Davis; Sonatas for Flute and Harpsichord No. 1,2,3 — Robert Aitken, Greta Kraus; The Stratford Ensemble — Raffi Armenian, Maureen Forrester	
1981	Arthur Ozolins	Stravinsky - Chopin Ballads	Bach Toccatas, Vol 2 — Glenn Gould; The Village Band — Canadian Brass; Orford String Quartet — Orford String Quartet; François Dompierre — François Dompierre	
1982	Montreal Symphony Orchestra/Charles Dutoit	Ravel: Daphnis Et Chloe (Complete Ballet)	Mozart's Serenade for 12 Winds and Double Bass — Toronto Chamber Winds; Rodrigo's Concerto de Aranjuez and Fantasia Para un Gentilhombre — Montreal Symphony Orchestra, Charles Dutoit - conductor; Rossini-Respighi's La Boutique Fantastique — Toronto Symphony Orchestra; York Winds — York Winds	
1983	Glenn Gould	Bach: The Goldberg Variations	Haydn: The Six Last Sonatas — Glenn Gould; Ravel: Bolero, La Valse, Rapsodie Espagnole, Alborada Del Gracioso — Montreal Symphony Orchestra conducted by Charles Dutoit; Stravinsky: The Firebird 1910 Version — Toronto Symphony Orchestra conducted by Kazuyoshi Akiyama; Strauss: Till Eulenspiegel, Salome's Dance, Death and Transfiguration — Vancouver Symphony Orchestra conducted by Kazuyoshi Akiyama	
1984	Glenn Gould	Brahms: Ballades Op. 10, Rhapsodies Op. 79	Andrew Davis Plays the Organ at Roy Thomson Hall — Andrew Davis; Brass in Berlin — Canadian Brass; Sibelius: Symphony #2 — Toronto Symphony Orchestra with Andrew Davis; Viola Nouveau — Rivka Golani-Erdesz	
