= Red Deer Symphony =

Red Deer Symphony Orchestra (RDSO) is a regional professional orchestra based in Red Deer, Alberta, Canada.

== History ==
The RDSO was founded in 1987 with financial assistance from the local branch of the Royal Canadian Legion. It quickly developed into a professional orchestra presenting six main series concerts, and a variety of community concerts and children’s programs. Among the latter is Choir Kids, an annual program which gives the opportunity to up to twenty elementary school choirs to perform with members of the orchestra.

Since 1990, its Music Director has been Canadian conductor Claude Lapalme.

The Orchestra has been heard in broadcasts for the CBC; replaced the Calgary Philharmonic Orchestra, which was touring Europe at the time, as the Orchestra for the Alberta Ballet Company in 2000; and has frequently collaborated with Edmonton’s Pro Coro Canada. Soloists such as pianists Katherine Chi tenor Benjamin Butterfield, soprano Karina Gauvin, violinists Andrew Dawes, and Scott St. John; cellists Cameron Crozman and Elinor Frey; as well as non-classical artists such as Ian Tyson and Tommy Banks have appeared with the orchestra over the years.

In 2017 the orchestra took part in Canada 150 celebration concert with Steven Page. For the anniversary, the RDSO, along with the Toronto Symphony Orchestra, had commissioned a short composition by Canadian composer Cheryl Cooney, entitled "Are we not drawn onward, we few, drawn onward to new era?". The orchestra appeared as a headlining act at the 2019 Canada Winter Games in Red Deer, Alberta. During the Covid lockdowns in 2020-2022, the RDSO produced a variety of video concerts and films, among them the Samantha Whelan Kotkas film "Wandering with Wonder" which won the 2023 Rosie AMPIA Awards for "Best Musical, or Variety Program or Series".

The orchestra has also partnered with the National Arts Centre Orchestra in 2023-2025 for the Music + Explorers where musicians visit schools throughout Central Alberta.
