= Claude Lapalme =

Canadian conductor and composer

Claude Lapalme is a Canadian conductor, arranger, orchestrator and composer. He presently holds the position of Music Director of the Red Deer Symphony and is also the Artistic Director of the Calgary-based baroque orchestra Rosa Barocca. His continued tenure with the Red Deer Symphony, which started in 1990, is one of the longest in Canadian history as leader of a Canadian professional orchestra.

== Biography ==
=== Early life and career as a conductor ===
Claude Lapalme was born in Montreal on May 29, 1962, to André Lapalme, a chemical engineer, and Louise Beauchamp, who was to become director of several non-profit organizations in both Toronto and Montreal. He is the grandson of former leader of the Parti Libéral du Québec and founder of the Ministry of Cultural Affairs Georges-Émile Lapalme.

Lapalme studied piano privately in Montreal and then Toronto, where his family moved in 1977. He studied conducting at the University of Toronto from 1980 to 1985, and then at the Royal Conservatory in The Hague from 1985 to 1987. His mentors were Victor Feldbrill and Lucas Vis.

He started his career as Assistant Conductor for the Orchestral Training Program at the Royal Conservatory of Toronto (now the Glenn Gould School) starting in 1987 and was appointed Music Director of the Red Deer Symphony in 1990. Shortly thereafter, he won the 2nd prize at the 1991 International Besançon Competition for Young Conductors. Lapalme was also Music Director of the Lethbridge Symphony from 1995 to 2004. He has guest conducted a variety of orchestras and ensembles in Canada, Cuba, Hungary, the United States, Switzerland, Macedonia, France and the United Kingdom, with orchestras including Moscow's Tchaikovsky Symphony Orchestra, the Calgary Philharmonic, the Edmonton Symphony and the Winnipeg Symphony. In 2024, he was invited to perform the New Year's gala concert at the National Opera and Ballet Orchestra in Skopje. Among the soloists with whom he has collaborated are pianists Anton Kuerti and Mark Zeltser; tenor Benjamin Butterfield, soprano Karina Gauvin, violinists Andrew Dawes, Oleh Krysa and Scott St. John; and cellists Denis Brott and Elinor Frey. He has conducted works of Sir Michael Tippett in his presence and conducted the Cuban premiere of a work by Leo Brouwer in collaboration with the composer.

Lapalme developed an enduring interest in Baroque and earlier music during his University days. In 2016, he founded the Calgary-based period instrument baroque orchestra Rosa Barocca. In 2023, cellist Elinor Frey and Rosa Barocca, under Lapalme's direction, won the Juno Award for Best Classical Album (small ensemble) for their album "Early Italian Cello Concertos." The orchestra has toured extensively in Alberta.

=== As arranger and orchestrator ===
Lapalme is a noted arranger and orchestrator, having worked in that capacity for Ian Tyson and Marvin Hamlisch, and for a large number of Canadian orchestras. In the early 2000's he was commissioned by the Edmonton Symphony to write several creative arrangements of songs from the Great Canadian Songbook. His arrangements and orchestrations have been performed in Carnegie Hall and as far away as Sydney, Australia. In 2025, his adaptations of French folk songs for soprano Karina Gauvin's album "Marie Hubert: fille du Roy" resulted in a second Juno Award nomination.

=== As a composer ===
Lapalme's compositions have been recorded both on CD and video. In addition to commissions, such as the 2022 premiere of his chamber orchestra work "Dancing Phoenix" by the Edmonton Chamber Orchestra, Lapalme instigated a COVID-19 lockdown project where 63 performers received a short solo piece, on request and for no fee. Many of those short works were put to videos by orchestras such as the Edmonton Symphony and the Calgary Philharmonic, and two of them – one for trumpeter Adam Zinatelli and the other for saxophonist Jeremy Brown – have been recorded on their respective albums.

== Press quotes ==
- ... Lapalme fit un parcours remarquable de solidité et de musicalité, son Brahms fut superbe... Le Figaro, September, 1991
- ... Lapalme's well-judged tempos and nuanced direction find the sweet spot between refinement and fire. Early Music America, June 20, 2022
- ...Karina takes the listener on a touching journey through time, at times danceable, at times melancholy, brought to life by arrangements bursting with colour and rich counterpoint. Bravo to Claude Lapalme ... for these creations worthy of Canteloube’s Chants d’Auvergne! PanM360, April 2024

== Awards and distinctions ==
- 1st prize, Heinz Unger Award, National Prize for Conducting, 1983
- 2nd prize. Compétition internationale de jeunes chefs d'orchestre de Besançon, 1991
- Queen Elizabeth II Platinum Jubilee Medal, 2023
- Winner, Juno Awards, Best Classical Album (Small Ensemble), 2023 ("Early Italian Cello Concertos" with Elinor Frey and Rosa Barocca on Analekta label)
- Winner, YYC Music Awards, Classical Recording of the Year, 2023 ("Emergence" on Redshift Records Label – Jeremy Brown, Saxophone & Lana Henchell, piano. For the composition: "Nowhere Left to Hide")
- Winner, Rosie AMPIA Awards, Best Musical, or Variety Program or Series, 2023. (Wandering with Wonder – Conductor & Orchestrator)
- Nomination, Juno Awards, Best Classical Album (Small Ensemble), 2025. (Karina Gauvin's project "Marie Hubert: Fille du Roy" on ATMA label – Conductor and Arranger)

== Discography ==
- Early Italian Cello Concertos – Elinor Frey, violoncello; Rosa Barocca, Claude Lapalme, conductor. Analekta Label, 2022. (Juno Winner: Best Classical Album (Small Ensemble), 2023
- emergence – Jeremy Brown, Saxophone; Lana Henchell, piano; Claude Lapalme, composer of “Nowhere Left to Run". Redshift Records Label, 2022
- Marie Hubert: Fille du Roy – Karina Gauvin, soprano; Claude Lapalme, arranger and conductor. ATMA Classique Label, 2024. (Juno nominee: Best Classical Album (Small Ensemble), 2025
- Fifteen Feet Closer to the Sky – Adam Zinatelli, trumpet; Claude Lapalme, composer of “Tarantella dell’Ubriacco”. Leaf Music Label, 2024
