= Robert Uchida =

Canadian violinist

Robert Uchida is a Canadian violinist hailed for his “ravishing sound, eloquence and hypnotic intensity” (Strings magazine). In 2013 he was appointed Concertmaster of the Edmonton Symphony Orchestra., having previously held the same position with Symphony Nova Scotia for seven years.

== Early life and education ==
Uchida was born in Toronto, and holds a Master’s Degree in Violin Performance from the Manhattan School of Music in New York and a Bachelor’s Degree from the University of Ottawa. His teachers and mentors include Andrew Dawes, Morry Kernerman, Patinka Kopec, Heratch Manoukian, David Stewart, and Pinchas Zukerman.

== Career ==
Prior to his appointments with the Edmonton Symphony Orchestra and Symphony Nova Scotia, Robert was invited to perform as Associate Concertmaster of the Rotterdam Philharmonic Orchestra for the 2005–2006 season. Engagements as a guest leader have included projects with the Netherlands Radio Chamber Philharmonic, Royal Flemish Philharmonic, and the Vancouver Symphony Orchestra.

His 2015 recording of Tim Brady's "Requiem 21.5: Violin Concerto" won the East Coast Music Award for best classical recording of the year. He has been featured as soloist with the National Arts Centre Orchestra, Symphony New Brunswick, Symphony Nova Scotia, Ottawa Symphony, l'Orchestre Francophonie, Edmonton Symphony, Red Deer Symphony, Kingston Symphony, Alberta Baroque Ensemble, and Early Music Alberta.

Uchida has performed at festivals including Arizona Music Fest, Scotia Festival, Sewanee Music Festival, National Academy Orchestra, Music by the Sea, and the Great Lakes International Summer Music Institute. From 2010-2013 he was the Artistic Director of the Acadia Summer Strings Festival.

Uchida performs on the "Dawes, de Long Tearse" 1770 G. B. Guadagnini violin (formerly owned by Andrew Dawes) with Vision Solo Titanium strings by Thomastik-Infeld Vienna.

== Teaching ==
Robert serves on the faculty at the University of Alberta and has held teaching positions at Acadia University, the Manhattan School of Music Precollege, and the National Arts Centre of Canada’s Young Artists Program.

== Discography ==
- Tim Brady: Requiem 21.5: Violin Concerto. 2015, CentreDiscs.
- Andrew Violette: Sonata for Unaccompanied Violin. 2008, Innova.
