= Gisela Depkat =

Canadian cellist and teacher (born 1942)

- Born: September 5, 1942 (age 83); Königsberg, Germany
- Education: Staatliche Hochschule fur Musik; Oberlin College Conservatory of Music
- Occupations: Cellist; Teacher
- Years active: 1964–present

Gisela Depkat (born September 5, 1942) is a Canadian cellist and teacher. She has won multiple prizes at several international competitions and has performed as soloist with many symphony orchestras. Depkat has taught at the University of Texas at Austin, at Wilfrid Laurier University, University of Western Ontario, McGill University and the University of Ottawa.

In addition to her solo career, she was principal cello of the Calgary Philharmonic Orchestra and the Kitchener-Waterloo Symphony Orchestra and was a private teacher at a summer children's camp and worked for two music institutions in the mid-1980s.

== Biography ==
=== Early life and education ===
On September 5, 1942, Depkat was born in Königsberg, Germany. In 1954, she and her parents settled in Port Arthur (today Thunder Bay) and became a naturalized Canadian in 1960. Depkat was educated in Canada, but returned to Germany in 1958 and matriculated to Hamburg's Staatliche Hochschule fur Musik, studying under A. Troester. In 1960, she won a scholarship, and moved back to Canada and studied with Lorne Munroe at that year's International String Congress in Puerto Rico. Depkat went on to study with Eugene Eicher in Pittsburg the following year and joined George Neikrug's class at the Oberlin College Conservatory of Music in Ohio in 1962. Through Neikrang, she became an advocate of the Emanuel Feuermann and physiotherapist D.C. Dounis-developed cello method.

== Career and recordings ==
=== Competitions ===
Depkat won the 1964 Geneva International Competition for cello. In 1966, she became a diploma winner at the Tchaikovsky Competition in Moscow. On December 7, 1966, she was named the second-prize winner of a Concert Artists Guild Competition in recital at The Town Hall in New York. Depkat went on to receive first prize at the Boston National Instrumentalist Competition in 1967, and was later appointed the American representative of Jeunesses Musicales at Expo 67 in Montreal for whom she went on tour in European countries such as Belgium, Denmark, France, Italy and the Netherlands as well as the United States. She joined the faculty of the University of Texas at Austin in late 1967. Depkat won first prize at the 10th CBC Talent Festival and was named a diploma winner at Casals Competition in Budapest the year after. She was selected by the Boston-based Group W station WBZ-TV as the United States' outstanding young instrumentalist in July 1967, earning a scholarship to New England Conservatory of Music.

=== Performances and recordings ===
She made her formal debut in New York at Carnegie Hall on February 6, 1968. Depkat won the 1969 CBC Talent Festival string section, and won first prize at the next year's festival. She also played Antonín Dvořák's Cello Concerto with the Winnipeg Symphony Orchestra. That same year, she played Joseph Haydn's Concerto in D with John Barnett's National Orchestral Association Orchestra at Carnegie Hall. From 1971 to 1974, Depkat taught at the University of Richmond in Virginia, serving as a member of its quartet-in-residence and was the Richmond SO's principal cellist. She also taught at the Reykajavik College of Music in Reykjavik, Iceland throughout the 1973–74 music season and was the Iceland Radio Orchestra's principal cellist between 1974 and 1975. From 1975 to 1977, Depkat was a member of the Stratford Ensemble part of the Canadian Chamber Ensemble and the Kitchener-Waterloo Symphony Orchestra as principal cellist.

Depkat gave the Canadian premieres of Alberto Ginastera's Serenata in Vancouver in 1975 and Krzysztof Penderecki's Capriccio for solo cello at the 1976 Guelph Spring Festival. In 1975 Depkat recorded the Schubert Arpeggione Sonata and the Brahms Cello Sonata No. 2 with Raffi Armenian as pianist.

In the 1977–78 concert season, Depkat appeared as soloist with the Vancouver Symphony Orchestra, and had engagements with the Toronto Symphony Orchestra, the Montreal Symphony Orchestra, the National Arts Centre Orchestra and the Vancouver Chamber Orchestra and undertook a concert tour of California. In 1978 Depkat recorded the Sonata for Solo Cello of Zoltan Kodály. Depkat participated in public recording sessions for CBCF-FM in 1980.

Between 1975 and 1977, again from 1980 to 1982 and for a third period between 1985 and 1987, she taught at Wilfrid Laurier University. Depkat also taught at McGill University and the University of Ottawa from 1976 to 1982. In addition, she frequently taught private students at University of Western Ontario.

She was again principal cellist of the Kitchener-Waterloo Orchestra between August 1982 and 1984, and went on to become assistant principal at Hamilton Philharmonic Orchestra. Depkat was principal cello of the Calgary Philharmonic Orchestra from 1988 to 1989. She also occupied the same role in Toronto for the Phantom of the Opera orchestra and again for part of the 1990–91 season for the Canadian Opera Company. Depkat was a teacher at a summer children's camp in Dwight, Ontario from 1981 to 1989. She worked for the Courtenay Youth Music Centre between 1985 and 1988 and the Nova Scotia String Music Camp in Dartmouth, Nova Scotia in 1988 and took part in that year's solo recitals at the International Workshop for Strings.

== Reception ==
Joanne Hoover of The Washington Post wrote of Depkat's performance: "Depkat plays with a warm, singing tone and imparts a gentle, most tender, quality to the music she is playing. She has the rare ability to play some of the most difficult passages." Hoover went on to say about the cellist: "Also rare among musicians, she seems to play as if she is hearing the music for the first time, imparting a sense of wonder to her audience." Howard Klein of The New York Times described Depkat "as an athletic performer, rather than an aesthetic one."
