= Juno Award for Classical Album of the Year – Solo or Chamber Ensemble =

Annual award for the best classical music album in Canada

The Juno Award for Classical Album of the Year has been awarded since 1985, as recognition each year for the best classical music album in Canada. It was a split from the prior category for Juno Award for Classical Album of the Year, alongside a separate new category for Classical Album of the Year – Large Ensemble or Soloist with Large Ensemble Accompaniment.

As of the Juno Awards of 2022 the award is no longer presented, and instead two separate awards are presented for Classical Album of the Year - Solo and Classical Album of the Year - Small Ensemble.

== Winners ==
=== Best Classical Album: Solo or Chamber Ensemble (1985–2002) ===
- 1985 – The Orford String Quartet, W.A. Mozart-String Quartets
- 1986 – James Campbell (clarinet), Stolen Gems
- 1987 – The Orford String Quartet, Ofra Harnoy (cello), Schubert, Quintet In C
- 1989 – Ofra Harnoy and Michael Dussek, Arpeggione Sonata
- 1990 – Louis Lortie, 20th Century Original Piano Transcriptions
- 1991 – The Orford String Quartet, Schafer: Five String Quartets
- 1992 – Louis Lortie (piano), Liszt: Annees De Pelerinage
- 1993 – Louis Lortie, Beethoven: Piano Sonatas
- 1994 – Louis Lortie, Beethoven: Piano Sonatas, Opus 10, No 1-3
- 1995 – Erica Goodman, Erica Goodman Plays Canadian Harp Music
- 1996 – Marc-Andre Hamelin (piano), Alkan: Grande Sonate/Sonatine/ Le Festin d'Esope
- 1997 – Marc-André Hamelin, Scriabin: The Complete Piano Sonatas
- 1998 – Marc-André Hamelin, Marc-André Hamelin Plays Franz Liszt
- 1999 – Angela Hewitt, Bach: Well-Tempered Clavier - Book 1
- 2000 – St. Lawrence String Quartet, Schumann: String Quartets
- 2001 – James Ehnes, Bach: The Six Sonatas & Partitas for Solo Violin
- 2002 – Angela Hewitt, Bach Arrangements

=== Classical Album of the Year: Solo or Chamber Ensemble (2003–2021) ===
- 2003 – Marc-André Hamelin, Liszt: Paganini Studies & Schubert March Transcriptions
- 2004 – Gryphon Trio, Murphy, Chan, Hatzis, Kulesha: Canadian Premieres
- 2005 – Angela Hewitt, Bach: The English Suites
- 2006 – Marc-André Hamelin, Albéniz: Iberia
- 2007 – Jean-Marie Zeitouni/Les Violons du Roy, Piazzolla
- 2008 – Marc-André Hamelin, Alkan Concerto for Solo Piano
- 2009 – James Ehnes, Homage
- 2010 – Joel Quarrington, Joel Quarrington: Garden Scene
- 2011 – Gryphon Trio, Beethoven: Piano Trios Op. 70 No. 1, Ghost & No. 2: Op 11
- 2012 – Marc-André Hamelin, Liszt Piano Sonata
- 2013 – Amici Chamber Ensemble, Levant
- 2014 – James Ehnes, Prokofiev Complete Works for Violin
- 2015 – James Ehnes, Bartok: Chamber Works for Violin Vol. 3
- 2016 – James Ehnes, Franck & Strauss: Violin Sonatas
- 2017 – New Orford String Quartet, Brahms: String Quartets, Op. 51 NOS. 1 & 2
- 2018 – Janina Fialkowska, Chopin Recital 3
- 2019 - Gryphon Trio, The End of Flowers: Works by Clarke & Ravel
- 2020 - Angela Schwarzkopf, Detach
- 2021 - Ensemble Made in Canada, Mosaïque
