= John James (Canadian musician) =

Canadian musician

- Birth name: John James
- Born: Woodstock, Ontario, Canada
- Origin: Canada
- Genres: dance, funk
- Occupation(s): singer, composer, musician, producer
- Years active: 1980s–2016
- Labels: Attic Records, Definitive

John James is a Canadian musician, who was prominent in the early 1990s for his funk-influenced brand of dance music. He released two albums, Big Fat Soul in 1989 and Mothers of Hope in 1993.

He garnered two Juno Award nominations at the Juno Awards of 1991, for Most Promising Male Vocalist of the Year and Dance Recording of the Year for his single "I Wanna Know", and one nomination at the Juno Awards of 1994 for R&B/Soul Recording for Mothers of Hope.

Prior to releasing his own recordings, James was a session musician, including playing saxophone on Corey Hart's "Sunglasses at Night" and opening for April Wine during their farewell tour.

== Discography ==
- Big Fat Soul (1989)
- Mothers of Hope (1992)
