= Paula Rasmussen =

American opera singer and attorney

Paula Rasmussen is an American opera singer and attorney.

A mezzo-soprano, Rasmussen landed a principal part in Les Troyens at the LA Opera in 1991. In the mid-1990s she sang at the Dallas Opera, including in La Cerenterola and Gounoud's Romeo and Juliet. She is strongly associated with the title role in Händel's Xerxes; among many performances, she sang the role at the Dresden Music Festival in 2000, under the direction of Christophe Rousset. Other roles include Sesto in Händel's Julius Caesar in a 2001 production at the LA Opera, and the title role in Carmen in 2003 with the New York City Opera.

As early as 2001, Rasmussen began to find opera overly taxing on her personal life. She earned a Juris Doctor degree from Golden Gate University School of Law in 2007 and began practicing personal injury law. Even after her career pivot, she continues to sing opera on a less frequent basis, and reprised the role of Xerxes at Berkeley's West Edge Opera in 2010.

In 2017, Rasmussen was among several women who alleged sexual misconduct by conductor Charles Dutoit several decades previously.
