= Ensemble Made in Canada =

Canadian classical piano quartet

Ensemble Made in Canada is a Canadian classical piano quartet, whose 2020 album Mosaïque won the Juno Award for Classical Album of the Year – Solo or Chamber Ensemble at the Juno Awards of 2021.

The quartet was originally formed as an all-female ensemble in the 2000s, consisting of Angela Park on piano, Judy Kang on violin, Sharon Wei on viola and Rachel Mercer on cello. The troupe won a Galaxie Rising Star Award in 2006. Kang left the ensemble in 2010 and was replaced by Elissa Lee. In the late 2010s Trey Lee Chui-yee sometimes filled in for Mercer, and was named a permanent member in 2020.

== Mosaïque ==
Mosaïque, a project inspired by Oscar Peterson's classic jazz album Canadiana Suite, saw the ensemble commission 14 short musical compositions, one representing each of Canada's 13 provinces or territories and one representing the indigenous peoples of Canada, which were performed by the quartet on a cross-Canada tour, before being released as an album in 2020.

The participating composers were David Braid, Barbara Croall, Julie Doiron, Andrew Downing, Vivian Fung, Nicolas Gilbert, Kevin Lau, Nicole Lizée, Richard Mascall, Samy Moussa, William Rowson, Darren Sigesmund, Sarah Slean and Ana Sokolović.
