= MCJ and Cool G =

Canadian hip hop duo

- Origin: Halifax, Nova Scotia, Canada
- Genres: Hip hop, new jack swing
- Years active: 1986–1997
- Label: Capitol Records
- Past members: James McQuaid; Richard Gray a member of JB and the Cosmic Crew in 1983

MCJ and Cool G were a four time Juno Award–nominated Canadian hip hop duo from Halifax, Nova Scotia. The duo were James McQuaid (MCJ), originally part of the Halifax hip hop group New Beginning, and Richard Gray (Cool G). MCJ was the rapper and Cool G mostly sang the choruses. Their sound was new jack swing which was popular at the time. MCJ and Cool G have a lifetime achievement award from ANSMA and a pioneer award from the ECMAS. Cool G is owner of Pyoor entertainment and host of his own podcast So Listen.

== History ==
MCJ and Cool G grew up in Halifax, Nova Scotia. They relocated together to Montreal in 1988 with plans to enter the music business. In 1989, they signed to Capitol Records in Canada, becoming the first Canadian rap group to be signed to a major label.

In 1990, they released their debut album So Listen which featured the singles "So Listen" and "Smooth as Silk" which were typical of their rhythm and blues influenced style.

MCJ and Cool G have been nominated for four Juno Awards. In 1991, they were nominated for Best R&B/Soul Recording with So Listen, Rap Recording of the Year with So Listen, and Single of the Year with "So Listen". In 1994, they were nominated for Best R&B/Soul Recording with Love Me Right.

The African Nova Scotian Music Association awarded them the Music Pioneer Award in 2007.

== See also ==
- Music of Canada
