= Desmond Hoebig =

Canadian cellist

Desmond Hoebig is a Canadian cellist with a career as a soloist, orchestral and chamber musician. Hoebig has held the chair of Principal Cellist in the Cleveland Orchestra, Houston Symphony Orchestra, and Cincinnati Symphony Orchestra. Hoebig is currently Professor of Cello at The Shepherd School of Music at Rice University, in Houston, Texas, US. He is also on the faculty of The Glenn Gould School at The Royal Conservatory of Music in Toronto. From 1989 to 1991 he was an associate professor at the University of Toronto in Canada.

Hoebig was born in 1961 in Vancouver, British Columbia, Canada. He studied with James Hunter, Jack Mendelsohn and Ian Hampton. In 1979, Hoebig, his sister, violinist Gwen Hoebig, and pianist David Moroz, formed the Hoebig-Moroz Trio. The trio won first prize in the 1983 CBC Radio Talent Competition. The trio has toured in Canada, the USA, and England.

Hoebig studied with David Soyer at the Curtis Institute of Music in Philadelphia. He received his BM and MM at the Juilliard School with Leonard Rose and Channing Robbins, and participated in master classes with Janos Starker and Tsuyoshi Tsutsumi at the Banff Centre.

Hoebig won the First Prize at the Munich International Competition (1984), the Grand Prize of the CBC Talent Competition (1981) and the Canadian Music Competition (1980). He was also an award winner at the Tchaikovsky Competition in Moscow (1982).

As a chamber musician, Hoebig was the cellist with the Orford String Quartet of Canada when they won a Juno award for the best classical music album in 1990. He has also performed for 30 years with the Hoebig-Moroz Trio and a duo with Andrew Tunis. Hoebig has taught and performed at festivals throughout North America, including; Banff, La Jolla, Marlboro, Music Bridge, Orcas Island, Sarasota and Steamboat Springs.

== Discography ==
Hoebig has recorded as a soloist with orchestras and in ensembles. He is featured on at least eight CDs, including Quartet For The End Of Time by Olivier Messiaen, as a member of the Houston Symphony Chamber Players.

Free Canadian Broadcasting Corporation recordings of several works are available at http://music.cbc.ca/#/artists/Desmond-Hoebig
