= Alain Lefèvre =

French Canadian pianist and composer

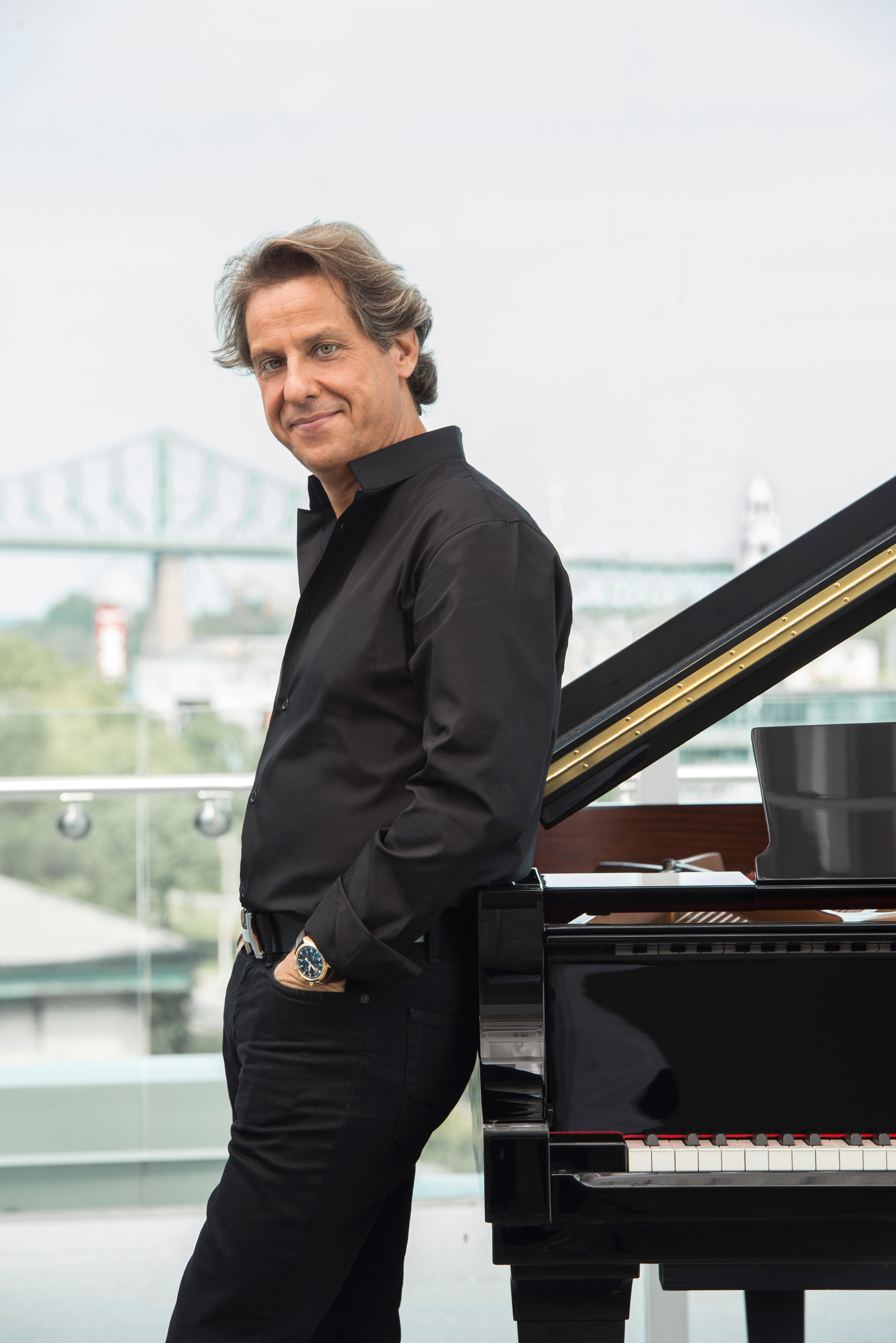

Alain Lefèvre, OC CQ (French pronunciation: [alɛ̃ ləfɛvʁ]) is a French Canadian pianist and composer. He has performed at venues such as Carnegie Hall, Kennedy Center, Royal Albert Hall, Royal Festival Hall, Théatre des Champs-Élysées, Théatre du Châtelet, Salle Pleyel, Teatro Colón, Palacio de Bellas Artes, Herodes Atticus Theatre, Epidaurus Theatre.

In 2009, Lefèvre was made a Knight of the National Order of Quebec and he was appointed an Officer of the Order of Canada in 2011. He has won numerous prizes, including a JUNO, an Opus, ten Felix (ADISQ) awards, and the AIB Award for "International Personality of the Year – Radio". He is Officer to the Order of Canada, Chevalier of the National Order of Quebec, Chevalier of the Pléiade Order and recipient of the Queen Elizabeth II Diamond Jubilee Medal.
