= Orford String Quartet =

The Orford String Quartet was a Canadian string quartet active from 1965 through 1991. They came to be the leading string quartet in Canada, and were well-known internationally.

== Founding ==
In 1951, Gilles Lefebvre launched a summer music camp for Les Jeunesses Musicales du Canada at Mont-Orford National Park in Quebec. The summer camp developed into the Orford Arts Centre, now Orford Music. Lorand Fenyves, a violinist and teacher then based in Geneva, began teaching at the music camp in 1963. The summer of 1965, two Canadians that Fenyves was teaching in Geneva, Andrew Dawes and Kenneth Perkins, came to study at Orford. With the support of Lefebvre and Fenyves, the two violinists formed a string quartet with Terence Helmer and Marcel Saint-Cyr. Their first concert was on 11 August 1965. The four performers were pleased with the performance, and decided to continue performing together. That fall, when Fenyves became a visiting teacher at the University of Toronto's Faculty of Music, the quartet followed him to Toronto. Fenyves took a permanent position at the university the following year. The quartet began their own association with the university in 1968, and the founding members began teaching at the Faculty of Music in 1972.

== Career ==
From 1965 to 1967, the quartet toured Canada on behalf of Jeunesses Musicales du Canada, with visits to France and Austria, and a debut recital at Carnegie Hall on 22 November 1967.

The quartet continued touring after they began their association with the University of Toronto. They are credited with more than 1,500 concerts across the country, premiere performances of more than 50 Canadian works, and more than 50 recordings. They toured in the United States in 1984.

The Orford Quartet shared first prize in a string quartet competition that the European Broadcasting Union held in 1974. They received the Canadian Music Council Award in 1978 for their recording of the Mendelssohn Quartets No. 1 and 2, and the council's Grand prix du disque in 1981 for a recording of quartets by Beckwith and Schafer then again in 1983 for a recording of the Beethoven string quartets.

Recordings by the Orford String Quartet won three Juno awards in the category Best Classical Album: Solo or Chamber Ensemble:

- 1985, Mozart: String Quartets
- 1987, Schubert Quintet in C, with Ofra Harnoy
- 1991, Schafer: Five String Quartets

Both Andrew Dawes and Kenneth Perkins were honoured with Membership in the Order of Canada in 1991. The citation for Dawes reads in part, "His leadership, commitment and endurance were largely responsible for the sustained quality, esteem and respect the [Orford String Quartet] garnered among musicians and audiences alike worldwide."

== Scholarship fund ==
The quartet performed their last two concerts at Music at Sharon in 1991, at Sharon Temple in Sharon, Ontario. The second last concert consisted entirely of the string quartets of R. Murray Schafer. For the final concert, they played exactly the same program as their first concert in 1965. The proceeds of this final concert went toward a scholarship fund administered by the Ontario Arts Foundation. From 1997 to 2012, the fund awarded scholarships to string chamber musicians attending university. The fund now provides a biennial award to young professional string chamber musicians.

== Personnel ==
A movement from Quintet for Clarinet and String Quartet by Johannes Brahms - Op. 115. William McColl and the Orford String Quartet, Andrew Dawes and Kenneth Perkins, violins; Sophie Renshaw, viola; Denis Brott, cello. June 1988.

- Andrew Dawes, first violin
- Kenneth Perkins, second violin
- Terence Helmer, viola (1965–1986)
- Marcel Saint-Cyr, cello (1965–1980)
- Denis Brott, cello (1980–1988)
- Paul Pulford, cello (substitute, 1988)
- Desmond Hoebig, cello (1989–1991)
- Robert Levine, viola (1986–1987)
- Sophie Renshaw, viola (1987–1991)

== Selected discography ==
- Mozart: String Quartets, Doremi Catalog DHR6601/2
- Schubert Quintet in C, with Ofra Harnoy
- Schafer: 5, Five String Quartets of R. Murray Schafer, with soprano Rosmarie Landrie, Centrediscs Catalog CD-CMCCD 39/4090 (1990)
- Beethoven: The Complete Quartets, Delos Catalog DE3039 (1994)
