= Jeanne Lamon =

American-Canadian musician (1949–2021)

- Born: Jean Susan Lamon; August 14, 1949; New York, New York
- Died: June 20, 2021 (aged 71) Victoria, British Columbia
- Genres: Baroque
- Instrument: Violin
- Partner: Christina Mahler

Jeanne Lamon, CM OOnt (August 14, 1949 – June 20, 2021) was an American-Canadian violinist and director.

== Biography ==
Lamon was born as Jean Susan Lamon in the Queens borough of New York City and was raised in Larchmont, New York. Her parents were Isaac and Elly Lamon. Lamon said her interest in baroque music came from her mother's love of Bach and her ability to play the piano. At three, she indicated an interest in playing the violin and at the age of seven, she began studying the instrument.

She studied violin at the Westchester Conservatory of Music with Editha Braham and Gabriel Banat. Later she attended Brandeis University in Boston where she earned a Bachelor of Music degree studying violin with Robert Koff, the original second violinist of the Juilliard Quartet. From Brandeis University, Lamon left the USA to study in the Netherlands with Herman Krebbers, then the concertmaster of the Concertgebouw Orchestra in Amsterdam. She heard her first baroque concert at the Concertgebouw, and she subsequently replaced her modern violin with a baroque version.

She returned to North America in the mid-1970s to establish her career as a baroque specialist. Lamon held the position of concertmaster and appeared in solo performances with many prestigious ensembles and orchestras in the USA and became in 1974 the first violinist to win the prestigious Erwin Bodky Award for Excellence in the Performance of Early Music.

In the late 1970s, while teaching in the Early Music Department of Smith College in Massachusetts, Lamon made two guest appearances in Canada with the Tafelmusik Baroque Orchestra, which resulted in an invitation in 1981 offering her the position of Music Director. Because a female music director was uncommon at that time, she changed her first name from "Jean" to "Jeanne" to avoid giving the impression that "Jean Lamon" was a Frenchman. Lamon began residing in Toronto in 1981 and became a Canadian citizen in 1988.

Under Lamon's leadership, Tafelmusik achieved international stature and is considered one of the best ensembles in its field with recordings for various labels, including Philips, Nonesuch, CBC Records, Sony Classical and Analekta. Her solo recordings include Vivaldi's The Four Seasons, the Juno Award-winning Bach Brandenburg Concertos and the Bach Violin Concertos, among others.

Lamon taught at University of Toronto and the Royal Conservatory of Music in Toronto. She received an honorary Doctor of Letters from York University in 1994. In 1996, she became the first recipient of the Muriel Sherrin Award which is presented by the Toronto Arts Council Foundation to artists and creators who have excelled at international initiatives in the fields of music or dance. In 1997, the Alliance Française of Toronto awarded Lamon its newly created Prix Alliance for her contributions to cultural exchanges and artistic ties between Canada and France. In September 1997, Lamon received the Joan Chalmers Award for Creativity and Excellence in the Arts for her artistic direction of Tafelmusik.

In March 1999, the Canada Council for the Arts awarded her the 1998 Molson Prize in the Arts, recognizing her outstanding lifetime contribution to the cultural and intellectual life of Canada.

Lamon was appointed a Member of the Order of Canada on July 13, 2000 in Ottawa. This award honoured her for her distinguished work as a baroque violinist, concertmaster, chamber musician, teacher, and Music Director of Tafelmusik. In 2014, she was made a Member of the Order of Ontario.

In October 2012, Lamon announced that after 33 years of directing Tafelmusik, she would be stepping down as full-time music director after the 2013/14 season after a career of recording, performing, and touring.

On June 20, 2021, Lamon died from lung cancer in Victoria, British Columbia at the age of 71. She was survived by Christina Mahler, her life partner of 43 years and a former cellist in Tafelmusik. (Lamon and Mahler met in Amsterdam.) After Mahler had retired from Tafelmusik in 2019, the two had moved to Victoria, and both continued to give concerts as guest artists.

== Sources ==
- Sony Classical biography
- Bach-cantatas.com website biography
- Tafelmusik website biography
