= Chantal Juillet =

- Born: December 19, 1960 (age 65); Montreal, Quebec, Canada
- Genre: Classical
- Instrument: Violin

Chantal Juillet, OC CQ (born December 19, 1960) is a Canadian Grammy-winning violinist.

== Early life and education ==
Juillet began studying the violin at the age of 6 with Claude Létourneau in Quebec City, continuing her studies with Luis Grinhauz in Montreal. By the age of thirteen, she had already given her first public recital and had appeared as soloist with the Montreal Symphony, winning soon thereafter all major Canadian competitions and touring the country with Les Jeunesses Musicales. By the age of 16 and was launched into international renown when she received First Prize at the Young Concert Artists International Auditions in New York City. In 1979 she was awarded the Prix d'Europe. At seventeen, she moved to the United States to study with Josef Gingold at Indiana University. She subsequently participated in masterclasses with Max Rostal and Nathan Milstein.

Juillet founded the Saratoga Chamber Music Festival in 1991 and has served as its artistic director since its founding. Juillet is also involved with music teaching through her work as head of chamber music of the Pacific Music Festival, and director of the chamber music department of the Canton International Summer Music Academy (CISMA). In addition, in 2005, she was made a Knight of the National Order of Quebec. In 2006, she became an Officer of the Order of Canada.

== Musical career ==
Juillet first came to prominence in the United States after winning theYoung Concert Artists International Auditions, which led to acclaimed debut performances in New York and Washington, DC. Juillet has performed with most major orchestras in North America including the Philadelphia Orchestra, the Boston Symphony, the New York Philharmonic, the Pittsburgh Symphony, the Detroit Symphony, the Milwaukee Symphony, the Atlanta Symphony, the Minnesota Orchestra, as well as the Montreal Symphony, the Toronto Symphony and the National Arts Center Orchestra.

In South America, she appeared with the Buenos Aires Philharmonic as well as the OSESP in Sao Paulo. In Europe, she was invited to the Concertgebouw Orchestra, the Royal Philharmonic Orchestra, the Philharmonia, the London Philharmonic, the BBC Symphony, the Hallé Orchestra, the Orchestre National de France and Orchestre de Paris, the Leipzig Gewandhaus, the Bamberg Symphony, the Berlin Rundfunk, the Munich Philharmonic, the Hamburg NDR, the Vienna Symphony, the Filarmonica della Scala, the Madrid RTE, the Czech Philharmonic, the Warsaw Philharmonic, the Oslo Philharmonic, Göteborg Symphony, the Finnish Radio Symphony, the Orchestre de la Suisse Romande and the Tonhalle of Zürich amongst others. In Israël, she appeared with the Jerusalem and Haifa Symphonies. In Asia, she has performed with the NHK Symphony, the Seoul Philharmonic, the Hong Kong Philharmonic, the Shanghai Symphony, the China National Symphony, the Guangzhou Symphony, the Singapore Symphony and in Australia / New Zealand with the Sydney Symphony and the New Zealand Symphony.

She toured North and South America, Europe and Japan with the Montreal Symphony, Spain with the Philharmonia, Hungary with the Orchestra National de Lyon and Japan with the NHK Symphony.

== Recordings ==
Stravinsky Concerto and Szymanowski Concerto No 1 and No 2 / Charles Dutoit / Montreal Symphony Orchestra - Decca # 436 837-2

Korngold Concerto + Weill Concerto for violin and winds + Krenek Violin Concerto (World Premiere recording) / John Mauceri / RundfunkSinfonieorchester Berlin - Decca # 452 481-2

Rêverie et Caprice (Chausson Poème + Ravel Tzigane + Fauré Berceuse & Romance + Berlioz Rêverie & Caprice + Lalo Fantaisie-Ballet & Guitare + Ysaÿe Poème Élégiaque / Charles Dutoit / MontrealSymphony Orchestra - Decca # 458 143-2

Ravel 3 Sonates pour Violon (Sonata Posth. + Sonata + Sonata for violin and cello + Pièce en forme d’Habanera + Berceuse sur le nom de Fauré + Kaddish + Tzigane with piano lethal) / Pascal Rogé, piano / Truls Mork, cello - Decca # 448 612-2 (Winner of the Gramophone Award for Best Chamber Music Recording 1997

Goldschmidt Album: “Rondeau” written for Chantal Juillet / Berthold Goldschmidt / Rundfunk Sinfonieorchester Berlin) Decca # 452 599-2

Poulenc Sonata for Violin and Piano with Pascal Rogé - Decca # 443 968-2- Spohr Septet with Pascal Rogé, piano and the London Winds - Decca # 443 892-2

Bartok Contrasts / Chantal Juillet / Martha Argerich / Michael Collins / Kodaly Duo for Violin and Cello / Chantal Juillet / Truls Mørk / Liszt Concerto Pathétique for 2 pianos / Martha Argerich and Nelson Freire / EMI # 7243 5 57035 2

Prokofiev Quintet opus 39 / Saratoga Music Festival / Chantal Juillet / Isabelle Van Keulen / Harold Robinson / Richard Woodhams /Michael Collins / EMI # 7243 5 56816 2

Radio-Canada LP recording of 1975 - RCI 439 (1975): Prokofiev Solo Violin Sonata opus 115 + Ysaÿe Solo Sonata No 4 opus 27 + Vitali Chaconne + Bloch Nigun (Lorraine Prieur-Deschamps, piano)

Juillet also served as Concertmaster of the Montreal Symphony for a few years, during which time she recorded the celebrated solos from Tchaikovsky’s Swan Lake and Bartók’s Two Portraits.

== Premieres ==
- 1994: Berthold Goldschmidt’s Violin Concerto / First public performance / Charles Dutoit / Orchestre National de France. Following the concert, the composer dedicated the concerto to Chantal Juillet
- 1996: Krzysztof Penderecki Concerto No 2 Metamorphosen North American Premiere / Krzysztof Penderecki / the Montreal Symphony
- 1997: Krzysztof Penderecki Concerto No 2 Metamorphosen / French Premiere / Stéphane Denève / Royal Scottish National Symphony
- 1997: Berthold Goldschmidt Rondeau / World Premiere (piano version) / Saratoga Chamber Music Festival / David Owen Norris, piano
- 1998: Erich Korngold Violin Concerto / Chinese Premiere / Charles Dutoit / China National Symphony
- 1998: André Prévost Violin Concerto / World Premiere / dedicated to Chantal Juillet / Charles Dutoit / Montreal Symphony. The creativeprocess behind the concerto is captured in the film Le Journal d’une Création (The Journal of a Creation) (?) which offers an intimate look at the collaboration between the composer and soloist as the work takes shape.
- 1999: Alfred Schnittke Concerto Grosso No 2 for violin and cello / French Premiere / David Geringas / Vassiley Sinaisky / Orchestre National de France
- 2000: Richard Danielpour Violin Concerto A Fool’s Paradise / World Premiere / Commission for Chantal Juillet by the Saratoga Festival / Charles Dutoit / Philadelphia Orchestra
- 2001: Lowell Liebermann Violin Concerto / World Premiere / written and dedicated to Chantal Juillet / Charles Dutoit / Philadelphia Orchestra
- 2002: Ned Rorem Trio for violin, oboe and piano / World Premiere / Richard Woodhams, oboe / Lowell Liebermann, piano / Saratoga Chamber Music Festival
- 2003: James Macmillan A deep but dazzling Darkness for violin and ensemble / US Premiere / Co-commission between the London Symphony and the Saratoga Chamber Music Festival / James Macmillan / Musicians of the Philadelphia Orchestra
- 2003: Krzysztof Penderecki Violin Concerto No 2 Metamorphosen / Japanese Premiere / Krzysztof Penderecki / NHK Symphony
- 2004: Ellen Zwilich Oboe Quintet / World Premiere / Saratoga Chamber Music Festival
- 2005: Karol Szymanowsky Violin Concerto No 2 / Chinese Premiere / Charles Dutoit / Guangzhou Symphony
- 2005: Behzad Ranjbaran Piano Quintet / World Premiere / Saratoga Chamber Music Festival

== Directorships ==
- 1991-2010: Music Director at the Saratoga International Chamber Music Festival Musical guests during Chantal Juillet’s 20-year tenure included Martha Argerich, Nelson Freire, Emanuel Ax, Yo-Yo Ma, Yefim Bronfman, Leonidas Kavakos,Wolfgang Sawallisch, André Watts, Peter Serkin, Joshua Bell, Kirill Gerstein, Gil Shaham, Yuja Wang and the Beaux Arts Trio and many more.
- 2000: Named Head of Chamber Music at the Pacific Music Festival for 3 seasons (PMF)
- 2005: Named Head of Chamber Music at Miyazaki International Music Festival for 5 years
- 2005-2006: Co-Founder of the Canton International Summer Music Academy (CISMA)
- 2009-2010: Co-Founder of the Lindenbaum International Festival in Seoul, South Korea

== Honors and Awards ==
- 1974-1977 — First Prizes at Canadian Music Competition
- 1978 — First Prize - CBC Competition
- 1979 — Prix d’Europe
- 1980 — First Prize, Concert Artists International Auditions (New York)
- 1997 — Gramophone Award for the Ravel album
- 2000 — Chevalier de l’Ordre des Arts et des Lettres, France
- 2003 — Prix Opus, Personality of the Year, Canada
- 2005 — Knight of the National Order of Quebec
- 2006 — Officer of the Order of Canada

== Donation ==
In December 2023, Juillet donated her music library to the Guangzhou Symphony.

== Personal life ==
Juillet has been married to conductor Charles Dutoit since 2010
