= Andrew Dawes (musician) =

Canadian violinist (1940–2022)

- Born: February 7, 1940; High River, Alberta, Canada
- Died: October 30, 2022 (aged 82); Aldearrubia, Spain
- Occupation: Violinist

Andrew Dawes CM (February 7, 1940 – October 30, 2022) was a Canadian violinist. He was known for his performances with the Orford String Quartet.

== Early life and education ==
Dawes was born in High River, Alberta. His violin teachers included Clayton Hare and Murray Adaskin, and he studied with Lorand Fenyves at the Conservatoire de Genève.

== Career ==
Dawes was first violinist of the Toronto-based Orford String Quartet throughout its existence from 1965 to 1991. The group toured North America in 1984. He also performed with the Tokyo String Quartet in 1995.

Dawes was a Professor of Music at the Faculty of Music, University of Toronto. He was Professor Emeritus of the School of Music, University of British Columbia. He was a Distinguished Visiting Scholar and Catherine Thornhill Steele Chair in Music at McGill University. He was a member of the board of directors of the Saint James Music Academy, and a director of the Vancouver Academy of Music's Chamber Music Institute.

Dawes served as a juror at music competitions including the London International String Quartet Competition, Coleman Chamber Music Competition, and Fischoff National Chamber Music Competition. He was chair of the Banff International String Quartet Competition from 1989 to 2004.

In 2013, the National Film Board of Canada produced a brief tribute to Dawes entitled Dynamic Range, written and directed by Lisa Jackson.

As of 2022, the rare 1770 Guadagnini violin that Dawes played from 1957 to 2018 is called the Dawes, de Long Tearse. Robert Uchida is the current performer.

Dawes died of prostate cancer on October 30, 2022.

== Awards ==
- Appointed Member of the Order of Canada in 1991
- The Dorothy Somerset Award for Excellence in Performance and Development
- The Queen Elizabeth II Golden Jubilee Medal
- Juno Awards: 11 nominations and 3 wins
- Chalmers National Music Award
- The Canada Council Molson Prize
- 1964 Prix de Virtuosité from the Conservatoire de Musique de Genève
- 2013 Governor General's Performing Arts Award for Lifetime Artistic Achievement

== Recordings ==
Notable Dawes recordings include

- Beethoven Complete Sonatas for Piano & Violin with Jane Coop
- Beethoven The Complete Quartets with the Orford String Quartet
- Mozart String Quartets with the Orford String Quartet
