= Louis Lortie =

Canadian pianist

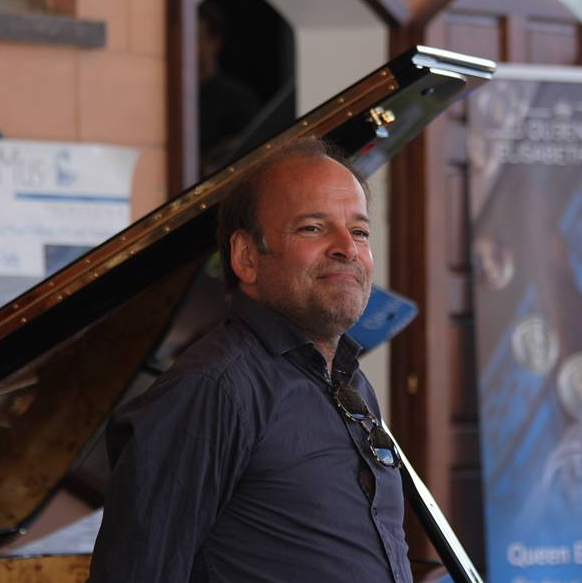
Louis Lortie

Louis Lortie OC CQ (born 27 April 1959) is a Canadian pianist.

== Education ==
Born in Montreal, Lortie made his debut with the Montreal Symphony Orchestra at the age of thirteen and the Toronto Symphony Orchestra three years later. Soon after he toured the People’s Republic of China and Japan.

Lortie's major piano instructors were Yvonne Hubert and Marc Durand in Québec, Dieter Weber in Austria and Menahem Pressler and Leon Fleisher in the US.

== Career ==
Throughout his career, Lortie has collaborated with conductors including Thomas Adès, Andrei Boreyko, Ricardo Chailly, Andrew Davis, Charles Dutoit, Mark Elder, Edward Gardner, Paavo Jarvi, Yannick Nézet Séguin, and many more.

He has also appeared as a soloist with the BBC Philharmonic, Cleveland Orchestra, Orchestre National de France, Calgary Symphony, Toronto Symphony, Atlanta Symphony, Vancouver Symphony, Milwaukee Symphony, Netherlands Radio Orchestra, the Warsaw Philharmonic, the BBC Scottish, Gewandhaus Leipzig, Concertgebouw Orchestra, Dallas Symphony, Baltimore Symphony, Seattle Symphony Orchestra, Dresden Philharmonic, Taiwan National Symphony, Chicago Symphony, BBC Symphony, Bournemouth Symphony, Bonn Beethoven Orchestra, Hong Kong Philharmonic, Rotterdam Philharmonic, Montreal Symphony, Quebec Symphony, Prague Philharmonia, Bern Symphony Orchestra, Detroit Symphony Orchestra, and the Philadelphia Orchestra.

He has appeared in such concert halls as Queen Elizabeth Hall in London, National Arts Centre in Ottawa and Roy Thomson Hall in Toronto.

Lortie is Master in Residence at the Queen Elisabeth Music Chapel (Waterloo, Belgium). Lortie is also the co-founder and artistic director of the LacMus International Festival on Lake Como.

== Selected recordings ==
- Camille Saint-Saëns, Complete piano concertos n°1, n°2, n°3, n°4, n¨5, Allegro appassionato Op.70 & Rapsodie d'Auvergne Op.73, Louis Lortie, piano, BBC Philharmonic, conductor, Edward Gardner . 2 CD Chandos 2018-2019
- Frédéric Chopin, "The Complete Études, Op. 10, Op. 25, Trois Nouvelles Études," Louis Lortie, piano. CD Chandos 8482

== Awards ==
Lortie won First Prize in the Ferruccio Busoni International Piano Competition in 1984. In the same year, he won the fourth place prize at the Leeds Competition. He was named an Officer of the Order of Canada, and was made a Knight of the National Order of Quebec as well as receiving an honorary doctorate from Université Laval.
