= Mario Bernardi =

Canadian conductor and pianist

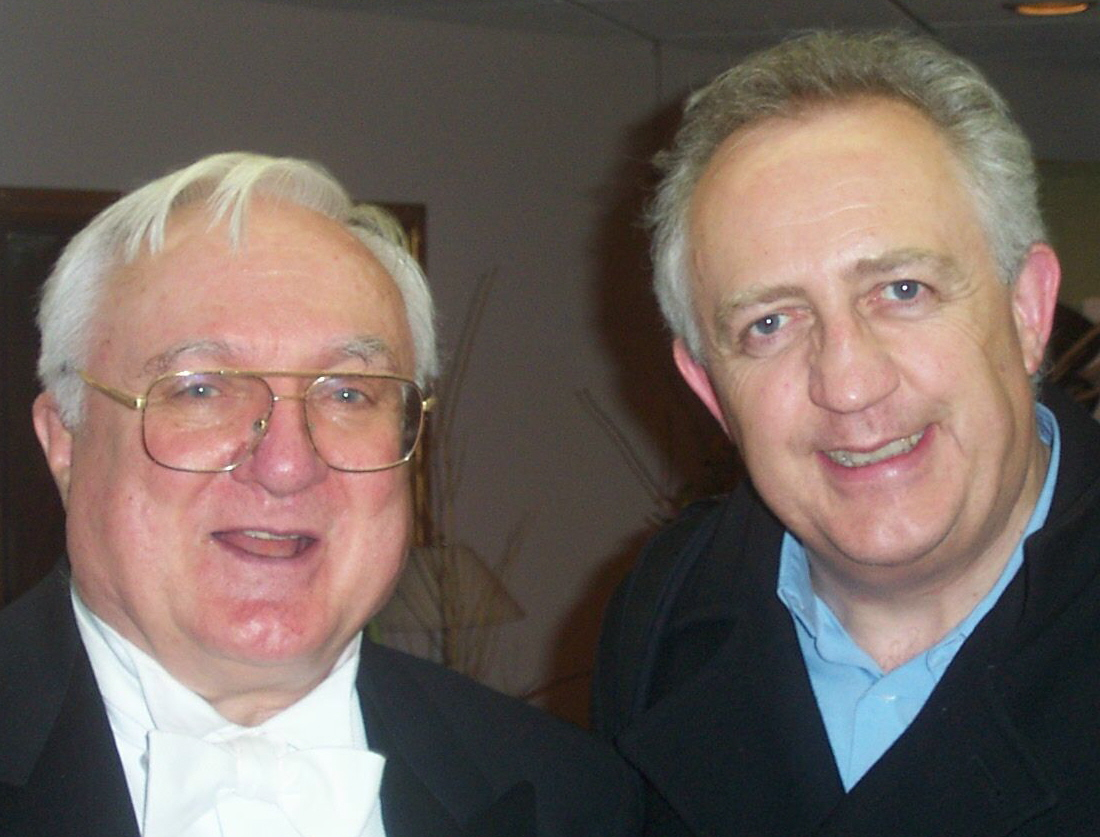
- Mario Bernardi (left), and Bramwell Tovey (right) in 2005
- Born: 20 August 1930; Kirkland Lake, Ontario
- Died: 2 June 2013 (aged 82); Toronto, Ontario
- Resting place: Mount Pleasant Cemetery, Toronto
- Occupations: conductor, pianist
- Awards: Order of Canada

Mario Bernardi, CC FRSC (20 August 1930 – 2 June 2013) was a Canadian conductor and pianist. He conducted 75 different operas and over 450 other works with the National Arts Centre Orchestra.

== Biography ==
Bernardi was born in Kirkland Lake, Ontario, and spent his first six years in Canada. After his family moved to Italy, Bernardi studied piano, organ, and composition with Bruno Pasut at the Manzato Conservatory at Treviso and took his examinations at Italy's Venice Conservatory.

After graduating in 1945, his family returned to Canada where he finished his studies at The Royal Conservatory of Music in Toronto. He then was a concert pianist.

In 1957 he conducted the Canadian Opera Company, and in 1963 was an assistant conductor and later a music director and conductor of the Mozart opera presentations at the Sadler's Wells Opera Company (now the English National Opera) from 1966 to 1968.

In 1969 he became the founding conductor of the National Arts Centre Orchestra in Ottawa, and also became the music director in 1971. He then led the Calgary Philharmonic Orchestra from 1984 until 1992. From 1983 until 2006 he was the principal conductor of the CBC Radio Orchestra. He then retired from full-time work, although he continued to perform with numerous orchestras as an occasional guest conductor; he was named NACO's conductor laureate in 1997.

He has made several dozen recordings for CBC Records, the CBC's in-house label, among others.

He died on 2 June 2013 in Toronto.

== Personal life ==
Bernardi worked until age 80, when he had a serious stroke and moved to a care home. He continued to play piano until he lost sufficient finger dexterity.

Bernardi was married, with one daughter and two grandsons.

== Honours ==
- Bernardi had honorary degrees from the University of British Columbia, University of Calgary, University of Windsor, University of Ottawa, Carleton University, Lakehead University and Laurentian University.
- 1972: He was made a Companion of the Order of Canada.
- 1982: Received the Diplôme d'Honneur from the Canadian Conference of the Arts
- 1999: Bernardi received the National Arts Centre Award, a companion award of the Governor General's Performing Arts Awards.
- 2001: He received the Governor General's Performing Arts Award for Lifetime Artistic Achievement.
- 2006: He was made a Fellow of the Royal Society of Canada.

Cultural offices
Preceded by Colin Davis	Co-Music Director, Sadler's Wells; 1966–1968	Succeeded by Charles Mackerras
