= Ofra Harnoy =

Israeli-born Canadian cellist

Ofra Harnoy עופרה הרנוי
- Born: January 31, 1965 (age 61); Hadera, Israel
- Origin: Toronto, Ontario, Canada
- Genres: Classical
- Occupation: Musician
- Instrument: Cello
- Years active: 1975–present

Ofra Harnoy CM (Hebrew: עופרה הרנוי; born January 31, 1965) is an Israeli-Canadian cellist. She is a Member of the Order of Canada. When she signed with RCA Victor Red Seal, Harnoy became the first Canadian classical instrumental soloist since Glenn Gould to gain an exclusive worldwide contract with a major record label. She is a five-time Juno Award winner.

== Life ==
Harnoy was born in Hadera, Israel. She moved with her family to Toronto in 1971. When she was six, she began cello lessons with her father, Jacob Harnoy. Her teachers included Vladimir Orloff, William Pleeth, Pierre Fournier, Jacqueline du Pré, and Mstislav Rostropovich.

She is married to the trumpeter, producer, and composer Mike Herriott.

== Career ==
Harnoy made her professional debut as a soloist with an orchestra at age 10. She had her solo-orchestral and recital debuts at Carnegie Hall in 1982.

Harnoy performed and recorded the world premiere of the Offenbach cello concerto in 1985 and the North American premiere of the Bliss cello concerto in 1984. She also made the world premiere recordings of several Vivaldi concertos. In 1987, she joined RCA Victor Red Seal and recorded several best-selling albums.

Harnoy has played with Plácido Domingo, Sting, Igor Oistrakh, Loreena McKennitt, and Jesse Cook.

In 2019, Harnoy released the album Back to Bach on the Analekta label.

In September 2023, she released the album Elgar & Lalo Cello Concertos on Sony Classical Records.

== Awards ==
- 1982 Concert Artists Guild Award
- 1983 Musical America Young Musician of the Year
- 1987 Juno Award for Classical Album of the Year – Solo or Chamber Ensemble
- 1988 Grand Prix du Disque
- 1989 Juno Award for Classical Album of the Year – Solo or Chamber Ensemble
- 1991 Juno Award for Instrumental Album of the Year
- 1993 Juno Award for Instrumental Album of the Year
- 1994 Juno Award for Instrumental Album of the Year
- 1995 Member of the Order of Canada

== Discography ==
- Elgar & Lalo Cello Concertos (2023)
1. Elgar: Cello Concerto in E Minor, Op. 85, 1996, with George Pehlivanian conducting the London Philharmonic Orchestra.
2. Lalo: Cello Concerto in D Minor, reissue of 1996 recording
- Portrait (2023), with Mike Herriott and the H&H Studio Orchestra. Compositions by George Gershwin, Gaetano Donizetti, Leonard Bernstein, César Franck, Léo Delibes, Pyotr Ilyich Tchaikovsky, and Georges Bizet
- Back to Bach (2019)
- Vivaldi: Complete Cello Concertos (2005)
1. Disc 1 with the Toronto Chamber Orchestra with Paul Robinson, conductor
  1. Concerto for Cello in D minor, RV 405
  2. Concerto for Cello in C minor, RV 401
  3. Concerto for Cello in B-flat, RV 423
  4. Concerto for Cello in C, RV 399
  5. Concerto for Cello and Bassoon in E minor, RV 409, with James McKay, bassoon
  6. Concerto Movement for Cello in D minor, RV 538
2. Disc 2 with the Toronto Chamber Orchestra with Paul Robinson, conductor
  1. Concerto for Cello in D, RV 403
  2. Concerto for Cello in B minor, RV 424
  3. Concerto for Cello in A minor, RV 422
  4. Concerto for Cello in C minor, RV 402
  5. Concerto for Cello in F, RV 412
  6. Concerto for Cello in G, RV 414
  7. Concerto for Cello in D minor, RV 406
3. Disc 3 with the Toronto Chamber Orchestra with Paul Robinson, conductor
  1. Concerto for Cello in F, RV 411
  2. Concerto for Cello in D, RV 404
  3. Concerto for Cello in A minor, RV 420
  4. Concerto for Cello in D minor, RV 407
  5. Concerto for Cello in G minor, RV 417
  6. Concerto for Violin, Cello, and Orchestra in F, "Il Proteo o sia Il mondo al rovescio," RV 544, with Igor Oistrakh, violin
4. Disc 4 with the Toronto Chamber Orchestra with Richard Stamp and Paul Robinson, conductors
  1. Concerto for Cello in A minor, RV 418
  2. Concerto for Cello in E-flat, RV 408
  3. Concerto for Cello in G minor, RV 416
  4. Concerto for Cello in A minor, RV 419
  5. Concerto for Cello in G, RV 413
  6. Concerto for Violin, Cello, and Orchestra in B-flat, RV 547, with Igor Oistrakh, violin
- Offenbach: Concerto Militaire, Andante; Lalo: Cello Concerto in D minor (1996)
- Imagine (1996)
- Trilogy (1993). Cello concertos by I Solisti Veneti, Claudio Scimone, and Ofra Harnoy
- Tchaikovsky: Rococo Variations, Music for Cello & Orchestra (1992)
- Bloch: Schelomo; Bruch: Kol Nidrei, Canzone, Adagio on Celtic Themes & Ave Maria (1991), with Charles Mackerras and the London Philharmonic Orchestra
- Haydn: Cello Concertos Nos 1 & 2, with Paul Robinson and Toronto Chamber Orchestra (Fanfare Records, 1983)
- Cello Recital (1980)
