= Charles Dutoit =

Swiss conductor (born 1936)

Charles Dutoit OC GOQ
- Dutoit conducting in 1987
- Born: Charles Édouard Dutoit; 7 October 1936 (age 90); Lausanne, Switzerland
- Occupations: Conductor, pedagogue
- Years active: 1957–present
- Website: charlesdutoitofficial.com

Charles Édouard Dutoit OC GOQ (born 7 October 1936) is a Swiss conductor. He is the principal guest conductor for the Saint Petersburg Philharmonia.

In 2017, he became the 103rd recipient of the Royal Philharmonic Society Gold Medal Award. Dutoit held previous positions with the London Royal Philharmonic Orchestra, the Philadelphia Orchestra, the Orchestre Symphonique de Montréal, the Tokyo NHK Symphony Orchestra and the Orchestre National de France. As of 2017, he was conductor emeritus of the Verbier Music Festival Orchestra. He is an honorary member of the Ravel Foundation in France and the Stravinsky Foundation in Switzerland.

In December 2017, following allegations of sexual assault, the Boston and San Francisco Symphony Orchestras cancelled his engagements. In a statement, Dutoit denied the charges.

== Biography ==
Dutoit was born on the 7th of October 1936 in Lausanne, Switzerland. He studied there, and graduated from the Conservatoire de musique de Genève, where he won first prize in conducting. Then he went to the Accademia Chigiana in Siena at the invitation of Alceo Galliera. In his younger days, he frequently attended Ernest Ansermet's rehearsals and had a personal acquaintance with him. He also worked with Herbert von Karajan at Lucerne as a member of the festival youth orchestra and studied at Tanglewood.

Dutoit began his professional music career in 1957 as a viola player with various orchestras across Europe and South America. In January 1959, he made his debut as a professional conductor with an orchestra of Radio Lausanne and Martha Argerich. From 1959 he was a guest conductor of the Orchestre de la Suisse Romande and the Lausanne Chamber Orchestra. After this, he was the conductor for Radio Zurich until 1967, when he took over the Bern Symphony Orchestra from Paul Kletzki, where he stayed for 11 years.

While head of the Bern Symphony, he also conducted the National Symphony Orchestra of Mexico from 1973 to 1975, and Sweden's Gothenburg Symphony from 1975 to 1978. Dutoit was principal guest conductor of the Minnesota Orchestra in the early 1980s.

In 1977, Dutoit became the artistic director of the Montreal Symphony Orchestra (OSM). Reaction to Dutoit joining the Montreal Symphony was positive. Peter G. Davis stated that Dutoit transformed the Montreal Symphony. New York Magazine wrote similarly about Dutoit, adding that he was noted for the championing of new Canadian music. Throughout these years, he called without success for a new symphony concert hall for Montréal. Dutoit resigned from the Montreal Symphony in April 2002, with immediate effect, after the Quebec Musicians Guild complained about what it called Dutoit's "offensive behaviour and complete lack of respect for the musicians". In January 2018, the OSM acknowledged ignoring complaints from musicians of verbal and 'psychological harassment' by Dutoit dating back to the 1990s. He did not return to the OSM as a guest conductor until 2016, in a concert at the new Maison Symphonique de Montréal.

Dutoit has received more than 40 international awards and distinctions, including two Grammy Awards (United States), several Juno Awards (Canada), the Grand Prix du Président de la République (France), the Prix mondial du disque de Montreux (Switzerland), the Amsterdam Edison Award, the Japan Record Academy Award, and the German Music Critics' Award. He and the OSM made many recordings for the Decca/London label.

Dutoit first conducted the Philadelphia Orchestra in 1980. From 1990 to 1999, he was music director of the orchestra's summer concerts at the Mann Center for the Performing Arts. From 1990 to 2010, he was artistic director and principal conductor of the Philadelphia Orchestra's summer festival in Saratoga Springs, New York. In 1991, he was made an Honorary Citizen of the city of Philadelphia. In February 2007, Dutoit was named the orchestra's chief conductor and artistic adviser, for a contract of four years, effective September 2008. Following the conclusion of his contract in Philadelphia in 2012, the orchestra named him its conductor laureate, as of the 2012–13 season.

Since 1990, Dutoit has directed the Pacific Music Festival in Japan. From 1991 to 2001, Dutoit was music director of the Orchestre National de France, with whom he made a number of recordings and toured extensively. In 1996, he was appointed principal conductor and in 1998 music director of Tokyo's NHK Symphony Orchestra. For the NHK television network, he made a series of documentary films for the young people called "Cities of Music" in Venice, St Petersburg, Tokyo, Buenos Aires (plus Rio de Janeiro and Manhaus), New York, Vienna, Budapest, Leipzig, Dresden, Paris and London. In 1997, he was made an honorary Officer of the Order of Canada. He is also one of a handful of non-Canadian citizens to be a Grand Officer of the Ordre national du Québec.

In April 2007, Dutoit was named principal conductor and artistic director of the Royal Philharmonic Orchestra as of 2009. In October 2019 he was scheduled to stand down as the RPO's principal conductor and to take the title of Honorary Conductor for Life of the orchestra, but instead he resigned in January 2018.

Between 2009 and 2017, Dutoit also served as the music director of the Verbier Festival Orchestra in Switzerland. In April 2014, Dutoit received the Lifetime Achievement Award by the International Classical Music Awards. He was also made an honorary member of Fondation Igor Stravinsky in Geneva and Fondation Ravel in Monfort l'Amaury, France.

In September 2018, Dutoit was named principal guest conductor of the St Petersburg Philharmonic, effective May 2019.

In late 2021, Dutoit withdrew from a scheduled subscription concert of the New Japan Philharmonic Orchestra due to his infection with COVID-19. He was subsequently booked by the orchestra to conduct in Summer, 2023.

== Personal life ==
Dutoit shuns publicity and protects his private life from the media. He has been married four times. His first marriage was to Ruth Cury, by whom he has a son, Ivan, who lives in Santa Monica, California, with his family; his children are Anne-Sophie and Jean-Sebastian. Dutoit was also married to Argentine concert pianist Martha Argerich (with whom he has a daughter, Anne-Catherine) and to Canadian economist Marie-Josée Drouin. He is now married to Canadian violinist Chantal Juillet.

== Allegations of sexual assault ==
In 2017 four women accused Dutoit of sexually assaulting them between the late 1970s and 2010. The alleged incidents occurred in a variety of places. One allegation was contested by witnesses. The allegations were made by Paula Rasmussen, mezzo-soprano (1991, Los Angeles); Sylvia McNair, soprano (1985, Minnesota); and Jenny Q. Chai, pianist. A singer with the Philadelphia Orchestra also said that Dutoit assaulted her in 2006 in upstate New York and again in 2010 in Philadelphia. A 24-year-old musician with the Civic Orchestra of Chicago said that Dutoit forced himself on her in 2006. In January 2018, Fiona Allan, a British theatre administrator, said that when she was an intern Dutoit sexually assaulted her at Tanglewood 20 years earlier.

In March 2018, the Boston Symphony said that Allan's allegations were "credible" and that three other women "credibly described incidents in the 1980s and 1990s in which they, too, were victims of Dutoit's sexual misconduct."

Other women also said that they had been assaulted.

=== Reaction ===
In January 2018, Dutoit resigned from his position as artistic director and principal conductor of the Royal Philharmonic Orchestra. Several other orchestras either cancelled engagements or severed ties with him, including the Boston Symphony Orchestra, the San Francisco Symphony, the New York Philharmonic, the Philadelphia Orchestra (which also removed his title of conductor laureate), the Sydney Symphony Orchestra, and the Chicago Symphony Orchestra.

The same month, Canadian CBC Radio/CBC Radio Two adopted a policy of no longer crediting Dutoit as conductor when it played his recordings.

== Orchestras with which Dutoit has recorded ==
- London Philharmonic Orchestra (LPO) DGG – Philips – Decca
- Royal Philharmonic Orchestra (RPO) DGG – Decca – Erato – RCA
- Philharmonia Orchestra, London Decca – Erato – EMI – CBS-Sony
- London Symphony Orchestra (LSO) DGG
- English Chamber Orchestra (ECO) Erato – EMI Classics for Pleasure
- London Sinfonietta Decca
- Bayerische Rundfunk Orchester München Decca – Erato
- Royal Concertgebouw Orchestra, Amsterdam Decca – EMI
- Boston Symphony Orchestra DGG
- Los Angeles Philharmonic Decca
- Montreal Symphony Decca-DGG-EMI-CBC Records-Philips
- Montreal Sinfonietta Decca
- Philadelphia Orchestra Decca
- NHK Symphony, Tokyo Decca – Sony
- Orchestre National de France Erato – Decca -Virgin Classics
- Orchestre de Paris Erato
- Nouvel Orchestre Philharmonique de Radio-France Erato
- Solistes de l'Opéra de Paris Erato
- Orchestre de la Suisse Romande Decca – Pentatone
- Orchestre de l'Opéra de Monte-Carlo Erato
- Göteborg Symphony, Sweden Sterling – Caprice – BIS
- Orchestra de la Svizzera Italiana EMI
- Norddeutsche Rundfunk Hamburg (NDR) NDR production
- Zurich Tonhalle Orchestra – Sony

== Honors ==
External audio
- Charles Dutoit conducting the Philharmonia Orchestra performing works by Peter Ilyich Tchaikovsky including: Piano Concerto No. 1 in B flat minor, Op. 23 with Pascal Devoyon; Violin Concerto in D, Op. 35 with Pierre Amoyal in 1991; Here on archive.org

- 1982 – Musician of the Year, Canadian Music Council
- 1982 – Great Montrealer
- 1984 – Doctor Honoris Causa, University of Montreal
- 1985 – Docteur en Musique, Laval University, Quebec
- 1988 – Canadian Music Council Medal
- 1988 – Officier de l'Ordre des Arts et des Lettres (France)
- 1991 – Honorary Citizen of the City of Philadelphia
- 1994 – Diploma of Honor by the Canadian Conference of the Arts
- 1995 – Grand Officier de l'Ordre National du Québec
- 1996 – Commandeur de l'Ordre des Arts et des Lettres (France)
- 1996 – Doctorem Musicae, McGill University
- 2002 – Honorary Officer of the Order of Canada
- 2003 – Prize to the best foreign conductor 2002, Music Critic's Association of Argentina
- 2007 – Médaille d'Or de la Ville de Lausanne
- 2009 – Artistic advisor, Shanghai Symphony Orchestra
- 2010 – Co-director of MISA Festival, Shanghai
- 2012 – Guangzhou Opera House (China) – Honorary Artistic Advisor
- 2012 – The Musical Fund Society of Philadelphia – Tribute
- 2014 – Lifetime Achievement Award – ICMA (International Classical Music Awards), Warsaw
- 2015 – Honorary Member of the Igor Stravinsky Foundation, Geneva
- 2016 – Honorary Committee Member of the Maurice Ravel Foundation, Paris
- 2016 – Koussevitzky Artist, Boston Symphony Orchestra (Tanglewood)
- 2016 – Nanjing University of the Arts, China: Lifetime Honorary Professor
- 2016 – Special Contribution Award,18th Shanghai International Arts Festival
- 2016 – Lauréat 2016, Fondation Vaudoise pour la Culture, Lausanne
- 2017 – Royal Philharmonic Society Gold Medal
- 2022 – Premio Una Vita Nella Musica from Teatro La Fenice, Venezia
- 2024 – Asociacíon de Críticos Musicales de la Argentina, Mejor Director de Orquesta Extranjero, Temporada 2023,

== Prizes ==
- 1971 – Edison Award, Amsterdam (Tchaikowsky Piano Concerto, Martha Argerich, RPO)
- 1972 – Grand Prix du Disque de l'Académie Charles Cros (Stravinsky The Soldier's Tale)
- 1973 – Grand Prix Spécial du 25ème Anniversaire de l'Académie du Disque Français (Honegger Le Roi David, Solistes de l'Opéra de Paris)
- 1978 – Premio della Critica Discografica Italiana (Paganini 6 Concerti per violino, Salvatore Accardo, LPO)
- 1978 – Prix Caecilia de l'Union de la Presse Musicale Belge (Paganini 6 Concerti per violino, Salvatore Accardo, LPO)
- 1981 – Grand Prix du Disque de l'Académie Charles Cros (Lalo, Caplet, Frédéric Lodéon, cello, Philharmonia Orchestra)
- 1981 – Grammy nomination (Chaminade, Ibert, etc., James Galway, flute, RPO)
- 1982 – Académie du Disque Français, Grand Prix du Disque (Fauré Pénélope, Orchestre Philharmonique de Monte-Carlo)
- 1982 – Prix Caecilia de l'Union de la Presse Musicale Belge (Fauré Pénélope)
- 1982 – Grand Prix du Disque de l'Académie Charles Cros (Fauré Pénélope)
- 1982 – High Fidelity International Record Critics Award (IRCA) (Fauré Pénélope)
- 1982 – Grammy nomination (Fauré Pénélope)
- 1982 – Grammy nomination (Rachmaninov Piano Concerto No 2, Schumann Piano Concerto, Alicia de Larrocha, RPO)
- 1982 – Grand Prix du Disque de l'Académie Charles Cros (Ravel Daphnis & Chloé, OSM)
- 1982 – Prix Mondial du Disque de Montreux (Ravel Daphnis & Chloé, OSM)
- 1982 – Prix Juno – Canada (Ravel Daphnis & Chloé, OSM)
- 1983 – Grand Prix du Disque, Canada (Ravel Daphnis & Chloé, OSM)
- 1983 – 21st Annual Japan Record Academy Award (Ravel Daphnis & Chloé, OSM)
- 1983 – Disque d'Or, Canada (Ravel Album, OSM)
- 1983 – Prix Félix (ADISQ) – Canada (Ravel Album, OSM)
- 1983 – Grand Prix de l'Académie du Disque Français (Saint-Saëns 5 Piano Concertos, Pascal Rogé, RPO, LPO, Philharmonia Orchestra)
- 1984 – Académie du Disque Français, Prix de la Musique Française (Saint-Saëns Symphony No 3 "Organ", OSM)
- 1984 – Académie du Disque Français, Mention Spéciale (Chabrier Le Roi malgré lui, Nouvel Orchestre Philharmonique de Radio-France)
- 1984 – Académie du Disque Français, Grand Prix Audio-visuel de l'Europe (Honegger Symphonies No 3 and No 5, Bayerische Rundfunk Orchestra, Munich)
- 1984 – Disque de Platine, Canada (Ravel Boléro, OSM)
- 1984 – Académie du Disque Français, Prix Georges-Auric (Falla El amor brujo, Three- cornered Hat, OSM)
- 1984 – High Fidelity International Record Critics Award (IRCA) (Falla Album, OSM)
- 1984 – Prix Manuel De Falla, Granada (Falla Album, OSM)
- 1984 – Grammy nomination (Noël, Noël with Leontyne Price, OSM)
- 1984 – Prix du Concerto Français de l'Académie du Disque, Paris (Ravel Piano Concertos, Pascal Rogé, OSM)
- 1984 – Edison Award, Amsterdam (Ravel Piano Concertos, Pascal Rogé, OSM)
- 1985 – Gramophone Record Award (Engineering and Production) (Ravel Album, OSM)
- 1985 – Prix Juno – Canada (Ravel Album, OSM)
- 1985 – Prix Félix (ADISQ) – Canada – Record of the year (Stravinsky The Rite of Spring + Symphonies of Winds, OSM)
- 1986 – Grand Prix du Président de la République, Académie Nationale du Disque Français, (Berlioz Symphonie Fantastique, OSM)
- 1986 – Stereo Review, Record of the Year Award (Chabrier Le Roi malgré lui, Nouvel Orchestre Philharmonique de Radio-France)
- 1986 – Prix José Bruyr – Grand Prix du Disque de l'Académie Charles Cros (Honegger symphonies No 2 and No 4, Bayerische Rundfunk, Munich)
- 1986 – Prix Félix (ADISQ) – Canada – Record of the year (Von Suppé Eight Overtures, OSM)
- 1987 – Gramophone Recording Award (Holst The Planets, OSM)
- 1987 – Grammy nomination (Holst The Planets, OSM)
- 1987 – Prix Juno – Canada (Holst The Planets, OSM)
- 1987 – Prix Caecilia de l'Union de la Presse Musicale Belge (Roussel Symphonies, Orchestre National de France)
- 1987 – Prix Félix (ADISQ) – Canada – Record of the year (Tchaikowsky Album, OSM)
- 1988 – Edison Award, Amsterdam (Holst The Planets, OSM)
- 1988 – Mumm Champagne Classical Music Award (Holst The Planets, OSM)
- 1988 – Grand Prix du Disque, Canada (Holst The Planets, OSM)
- 1988 – Laser d'Or, Académie du Disque Français (Stravinsky Petrushka, Chant du Rossignol, 4 Études, OSM)
- 1988 – Grand Prix du Disque, Canada (Stravinsky Petrushka, etc., OSM)
- 1989 – Prix Juno – Canada (Bartok Concerto for Orchestra, Music for Strings, Percussion and Celesta, OSM)
- 1990 – Prix Félix (ADISQ) – (Gershwin Album, Louis Lortie, piano, OSM)
- 1991 – Grand Prix de l'Académie du Disque, Japan (Debussy Album, OSM)
- 1991 – Prix Juno – Canada (Debussy Album, OSM)
- 1991 – Preis der Deutschen Schallplattenkritik, Germany (Debussy Pelléas & Mélisande, OSM)
- 1991 – Prix Félix (ADISQ) – Canada – Best record of the year (Debussy Pelléas & Mélisande, OSM)
- 1992 – Prix Juno – Canada (Debussy Pelléas & Mélisande, OSM)
- 1992 – Grammy nomination (Debussy Pelléas & Mélisande, OSM)
- 1994 – Nouvelle Académie du Disque: Grand Prix Anniversaire Tchaikowsky, Paris (The Complete Nutcracker, OSM)
- 1995 – Palmarès des Palmarès, Nouvelle Académie du Disque, Paris (Berlioz Les Troyens, OSM)
- 1995 – Académie française du Disque Lyrique, Orphée du Prestige Lyrique, Paris (Berlioz Les Troyens, OSM)
- 1995 – Grammy nomination for best Classical recording of the year (Berlioz Les Troyens, OSM)
- 1995 – Prix Juno – Best classical recording of the year (Berlioz Les Troyens, OSM)
- 1995 – Grammy: Best Opera Recording (Berlioz Les Troyens, OSM)
- 1995 – Grammy nomination, (Mussorgsky Pictures at an exhibition, OSM)
- 1996 – Grammy nomination (Rimsky-Korsakov Scheherazade, OSM)
- 1996 – Prix Juno – Canadian Academy of Recording and Sciences (Shostakovich Symphonies No 5 and No 9, OSM)
- 1997 – Prix Juno – Canada – Best recording of the year (Berlioz Damnation de Faust, OSM)
- 1997 – Palmarès des Palmarès, Paris: Grand Prix, Nouvelle Académie du Disque (Berlioz Damnation de Faust)
- 1997 – Prix de l'Académie du Disque, Japan (Berlioz Symphonie Fantastique, OSM)
- 1997 – Prix de l'Académie du Disque, Japan (Debussy Album, OSM)
- 1999 – London / Decca Legends (Ravel Daphnis & Chloé, OSM)
- 2000 – Prix Juno – Canada (Respighi: La Boutique Fantasque, Impressioni Brasiliane, OSM)
- 2000 – Grammy: Best Soloist with Orchestra (Bartok Piano Concerto No 3, Prokofiev Concertos No 1 and No 3, Martha Argerich, OSM)
- 2002 – Prix Juno – Canada (Bruch 3 Violin Concertos, James Ehnes, OSM)
- 2004 – New York Times Best Classical Discs of the year (Theodorakis "Zorba", OSM)
- 2007 – Grammy nomination (Franck Symphonic Variations, Saint-Saëns Piano Concertos No 2 and No 5, Jean-Yves Thibaudet, Orchestre de la Suisse Romande OSR)
- 2 Grammy Awards: 1995 and 2000.
- 9 Grammy nominations: 1981, 1982, 1983, 1984, 1987, 1992, 1995, 1996, and 2007.

== Discography ==
Year	Title	Artist(s) (Dutoit as conductor)	Label
1970	Tchaikovsky: Piano Concerto No. 1	Martha Argerich, Royal Philharmonic Orchestra	DG
1971	Honegger: Le Roi David	Various soloists	Erato
1974	Stravinsky: Pulcinella / Apollon Musagète	English Chamber Orchestra	Erato
1974	Paganini: Violin Concerto No. 6	Salvatore Accardo, London Philharmonic Orchestra	DG
1975	Paganini: Violin Concerto No. 3 / Viola Sonata	Salvatore Accardo, Dino Asciolla, London Philharmonic Orchestra	DG
1975	Paganini: Violin Concerto No. 5	Salvatore Accardo, London Philharmonic Orchestra	DG
1976	Paganini: Violin Concerto No. 1	Salvatore Accardo, London Philharmonic Orchestra	DG
1976	Mendelssohn: Violin Concertos	Salvatore Accardo, London Philharmonic Orchestra	Philips
1977	Paganini: Violin Concerto No. 4	Salvatore Accardo, London Philharmonic Orchestra	DG
1977	Paganini: Violin Concerto No. 2 "La Campanella"	Salvatore Accardo, London Philharmonic Orchestra	DG
1977	Stravinsky: Petrushka	Tamás Vásáry, London Symphony Orchestra	DG
1977	French Flute Concertos	James Galway, Royal Philharmonic Orchestra	RCA
1977	Stenhammar: Piano Concerto No. 1	Irene Mannheimer, Göteborgs Symfoniker	Sterling
1980	Dompierre: Piano Concerto / Harmonica Flash	Orchestre symphonique de Montréal	DG
1981	Saint-Saëns: Danse macabre / Phaéton / Le Rouet d'Omphale etc.	Philharmonia Orchestra	Decca
1981	Ravel: Daphnis et Chloé	Chœur et Orchestre symphonique de Montréal	Decca
1981	Lalo: Symphonie espagnole / Saint-Saëns: Violin Concerto No. 1	Kyung-Wha Chung, Orchestre symphonique de Montréal	Decca
1981	Schumann: Piano Concerto / Rachmaninoff: Piano Concerto No. 2	Alicia De Larrocha, Royal Philharmonic Orchestra	Decca
1981	Rodrigo: Concierto De Aranjuez / Fantasía para un Gentilhombre	Carlos Bonell, Orchestre symphonique de Montréal	Decca
1981	Mozart: Piano Concertos Nos. 26 and 27	Rafaël Orozco, English Chamber Orchestra	EMI
1981	Tchaikovsky: Piano Concerto No. 1 / Rococo Variations	Myung-Whun Chung, Myung-Wha Chung, Los Angeles Philharmonic Orchestra	Decca
1981	Tchaikovsky: Complete Works for Violin and Orchestra	Pierre Amoyal, Philharmonia Orchestra	Erato
1981	Saint-Saëns: The 5 Piano Concertos	Pascal Rogé, Royal Philharmonia Orchestra, Philharmonia Orchestra	Decca (released individually)
1981	Sibelius: Violin Concerto / Humoresques	Pierre Amoyal, Philharmonia Orchestra	Erato
1982	Tchaikovsky / Mendelssohn: Violin Concertos	Kyung-Wha Chung, Orchestre symphonique de Montréal	Decca
1982	Saint-Saëns: Symphony No. 3 "Organ"	Orchestre symphonique de Montréal	Decca
1982	Ravel: Orchestral Works	Orchestre symphonique de Montréal	Decca
1982	Stravinsky: Symphony in C / Symphony in Three Movements	L'Orchestre de la Suisse Romande	Decca
1982	Tchaikovsky: Piano Concerto No. 1 / Prokofiev: Piano Sonata No. 2	Pascal Devoyon, Philharmonia Orchestra	Erato
1982	Fauré: Pénélope	Jessye Norman, Alain Vanzo, Jocelyne Taillon, José van Dam, Philippe Huttenlocher, Ensemble Vocal Jean Laforge, Orchestre philharmonique de Monte-Carlo	Erato
1983	De Falla: The Three-Cornered Hat / El Amor Brujo	Colette Boky, Huguette Tourangeau, Orchestre symphonique de Montréal	Decca
1983	Respighi: Pines of Rome / Fountains of Rome / Roman Festivals	Orchestre symphonique de Montréal	Decca
1983	D'Indy: Symphonie sur un chant Montagnard Français / Franck: Variations symphoniques / Fauré: Ballade	Philippe Entremont, Philharmonia Orchestra	CBS Masterworks
1983	Ravel: The Piano Concertos / Menuet antique / Une barque sur l'océan	Pascal Rogé, Orchestre symphonique de Montréal	Decca
1983	Mendelssohn: Piano Concertos Nos. 1 & 2	András Schiff, Bavarian Radio Symphony Orchestra	Decca
1983	Noël – Noël	Leontyne Price, Orchestre symphonique de Montréal	Decca
1984	Honegger: Symphonies Nos. 3 "Liturgique" & 4 "Di Tre Re"	Bavarian Radio Symphony Orchestra	Erato
1984	Rimsky-Korsakov: Shéhérazade / Capriccio Espagnol	Richard Roberts, Orchestre symphonique de Montréal	Decca
1984	Offenbach: Gaîté parisienne / Gounod: Faust (ballet music)	Orchestre symphonique de Montréal	Decca
1984	Ravel: Orchestral Works	Orchestre symphonique de Montréal	Decca
1984	Stravinsky: Le sacre du Printemps / Symphonies of Wind Instruments	Orchestre symphonique de Montréal	Decca
1985	Berlioz: Symphonie fantastique	Orchestre symphonique de Montréal	Decca
1985	Suppé: Overtures	Orchestre symphonique de Montréal	Decca
1985	Chabrier: Le Roi Malgré Lui	Barbara Hendricks, Isabel Garcisanz, Gino Quilico, Peter Jeffes, Jean-Philippe Lafont, Chœurs de Radio France, Orchestre philharmonique de Radio France	Erato
1985	Rodrigo: Concierto de Aranjuez / Moreno-Buendía: Suite concertante	Marisa Robles, Philharmonia Orchestra	Decca
1986	Saint-Saëns: The Carnival of the Animals	Cristina Ortiz, Pascal Rogé, London Sinfonietta	Decca
1986	Tchaikovsky: 1812 Overture / Capriccio Italien / The Nutcracker Suite / Marche slave	Orchestre symphonique de Montréal	Decca
1986	Berlioz: Roméo et Juliette / Symphonie funèbre	Florence Quivar, Alberto Cupido, Tom Krause, L'Ensemble vocal Tudor de Montréal, Orchestre symphonique de Montréal	Decca
1986	Stravinsky: The Firebird / Scherzo fantastique / Fireworks	Orchestre symphonique de Montréal	Decca
1987	Holst: The Planets	Orchestre symphonique de Montréal	Decca
1987	Mendelssohn: A Midsummer Night's Dream / The Hebrides / Ruy Blas / Die schöne Melusine	Orchestre symphonique de Montréal	Decca
1987	Tchaikovsky: Piano Concerto No. 1 / Rachmaninoff: Piano Concerto No. 2	Jorge Bolet, Orchestre symphonique de Montréal	Decca
1987	Roussel: Symphonies Nos. 1 & 3	Orchestre national de France	Erato
1987	Mussorgsky: Pictures at an Exhibition / The Night on Bare Mountain	Orchestre symphonique de Montréal	Decca
1987	Roussel: Symphonies Nos. 2 & 4	Orchestre national de France	Erato
1987	Stravinsky: Pétrouchka / Le Chant du Rossignol	Orchestre symphonique de Montréal	Decca
1987	Stravinsky: L'histoire du Soldat / Renard	Eric Tappy, Pierre-André Blazer, Philippe Huttenlocher, Jules Bastin, various instrumental soloists	Erato
1987	Ravel: Boléro / La valse / Daphnis et Chloé Suite No. 2 / Pavane pour une infante défunte	Orchestre symphonique de Montréal	Decca
1988	Fauré: Requiem / Pelléas et Mélisande / Pavane	Kiri Te Kanawa, Sherrill Milnes, Chœur et Orchestre symphonique de Montréal	Decca
1988	Bizet: L'Arlésienne and Carmen Suites	Orchestre symphonique de Montréal	Decca
1988	Berlioz: Harold en Italie	Pinchas Zukerman, Orchestre symphonique de Montréal	Decca
1988	Prokofiev: Symphonies Nos. 1 & 5	Orchestre symphonique de Montréal	Decca
1988	Roussel: Bacchus et Ariadne / Suite in F	Orchestre de Paris	Erato
1989	Gubaidulina: Offertorium	Gidon Kremer, Boston Symphony Orchestra	DG
1989	Fête à la Française	Orchestre symphonique de Montréal	Decca
1989	Lalo: Symphonie espagnole / Saint-Saëns: Violin Concerto No. 3	Joshua Bell, Orchestre symphonique de Montréal	Decca
1989	Gershwin: Rhapsody in Blue / An American in Paris / Porgy and Bess – A Symphonic Portrait	Louis Lortie, Orchestre symphonique de Montréal	Decca
1989	Tchaikovsky: Symphony No. 4	Orchestre symphonique de Montréal	Decca
1990	Chopin: Piano Concertos	Jorge Bolet, Orchestre symphonique de Montréal	Decca
1990	Debussy: Images / Nocturnes	Orchestre symphonique de Montréal	Decca
1990	Elgar: Enigma Variations / Falstaff	Orchestre symphonique de Montréal	Decca
1990	Tchaikovsky: Symphony No. 5 / Hamlet	Orchestre symphonique de Montréal	Decca
1990	Debussy: La Mer / Jeux / Le martyre de Saint Sébastien / Prélude à l'après-midi d'un Faune	Orchestre symphonique de Montréal	Decca

Cultural offices
Preceded by Alexander Rumpf	Principal Conductor and Music Director, NHK Symphony Orchestra; 1996–1998 (principal conductor), 1998–2003 (music director)	Succeeded by Vladimir Ashkenazy
