= National Arts Centre Orchestra =

Canadian orchestra

- Orchestra
- Founded: 1969
- Concert hall: National Arts Centre Southam Hall
- Music director: John Storgårds
- Website: nac-cna.ca/en/orchestra

The National Arts Centre Orchestra (NAC Orchestra) is a Canadian orchestra based in Ottawa, Ontario. The NAC Orchestra's primary concert venue is the Southam Hall inside the National Arts Centre. Since its inception, the orchestra has commissioned more than 90 works, mostly from Canadian composers. The NAC Orchestra has made over 50 commercially released recordings. As of 2026, the current music director of the NAC Orchestra is John Storgårds.

== History ==
The NAC Orchestra was founded in 1969 as the resident orchestra of the newly opened National Arts Centre, with Jean-Marie Beaudet as music director and Mario Bernardi as founding conductor. Bernardi became music director in 1971 and held the post until 1982. The NAC Orchestra undertook first international tour in 1973 to Europe, travelling as far as Leningrad. Beaudet and Bernardi are the only Canadian conductors to be appointed music director of the NAC Orchestra. Bernardi was named Conductor Laureate in 1997.

Subsequent NAC Orchestra music directors have included Franco Mannino (1982–1987), Gabriel Chmura (1987–1990), and Trevor Pinnock (1991–1997). From 1999 to 2015, Pinchas Zukerman was the NAC Orchestra's music director. The orchestra expanded to 61 players during Zukerman's tenure.

The NAC Orchestra has remained committed to touring internationally, averaging approximately one tour per every two years. Previous tours have taken them to the UK, Japan (in 1985 with soloist Tsuyoshi Tsutsumi, who had taught at University of Western Ontario in Canada from 1967 to 1984), China, the United-States of America, and all over Europe. The NAC Orchestra has visited more than 125 cities in Canada and more than 130 cities internationally in its 51-year history, including a coast-to-coast Canadian tour in 1999 and again in 2017.

In October 2013, the NAC Orchestra announced the appointment of Alexander Shelley as its next music director, as of the 2015–2016 season, with an initial contract of 4 years. In 2018, the NAC announced the extension of Shelley's contract to 2022. In May 2019, the NAC Orchestra completed a five-country European tour. Shelley concluded his tenure as its music director at the close of the 2025–2026 season.

Franz-Paul Decker was Principal Guest Conductor from 1991 to 1999. In 2001, Jean-Philippe Tremblay became the NAC Orchestra's Apprentice Conductor, a then newly created post, for a two-year term. Jack Everly is the orchestra's current principal pops conductor.

In 2015, John Storgårds became the orchestra's principal guest conductor, an agreement that had been most recently contracted with the NAC Orchestra through the 2027–2028 season. In September 2025, the NACO announced the appointment of Storgårds as its next music director, effective with the 2026–2027 season.

== Music directors ==
- Jean-Marie Beaudet (1969–1971)
- Mario Bernardi (1971–1982)
- Franco Mannino (1982–1987)
- Gabriel Chmura (1987–1990)
- Trevor Pinnock (1991–1997)
- Pinchas Zukerman (1999–2015)
- Alexander Shelley (2015–2026)
- John Storgårds (2026–present)
