= Calgary Philharmonic Orchestra =

Canadian orchestra

Calgary Philharmonic Orchestra (CPO)
- Orchestra
- Founded: 1955
- Location: Calgary, Alberta, Canada
- Concert hall: Jack Singer Concert Hall
- Principal conductor: (post vacant)
- Website: calgaryphil.com

The Calgary Philharmonic Orchestra is a Canadian orchestra based in Calgary, Alberta. The orchestra gives the majority of its performances in the Jack Singer Concert Hall at Arts Commons. It is also the resident orchestra for the Calgary Opera, Alberta Ballet Company, and the Honens International Piano Competition.

== History ==
The orchestra's history began in 1910 with the founding of the first Calgary Symphony by violinist A.P. Howell. Max Weil was this early orchestra's conductor in 1912–1914. In 1947, the New Calgary Symphony was formed by Clayton Hare with members of the Mount Royal Orchestra and the previous Calgary Symphony.

In 1955, the Dutch conductor Henry Plukker created the Alberta Philharmonic, which in the same year merged with the Calgary Symphony. The new name for the combined orchestra was the Calgary Philharmonic Orchestra. Prelude, the orchestra's program magazine, began publication in October 1975 and continues to be their official concert programme. The Orchestra often features the Calgary Philharmonic Chorus, a chorus of over 120 members.

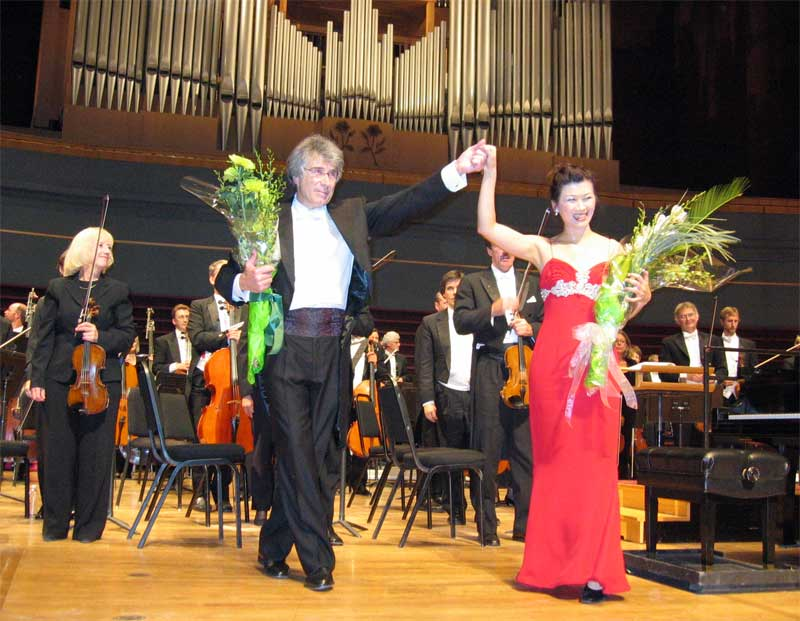
Gwhyneth Chen, soloist, and Maestro Edmon Colomer, after a performance with the Calgary Symphony, 2003

In 2001, management of the orchestra initiated a lockout and salaries of the players were cut by an average of 20 percent. In 2002, the orchestra had declared bankruptcy. In 2003, the orchestra came out of receivership, and Mike Bregazzi became their CEO and president. He retired from these posts in 2005. Ann Lewis Luppino became the orchestra's next CEO. Lewis Luppino retired in June 2015, and Paul Dornian was named the new President and CEO.

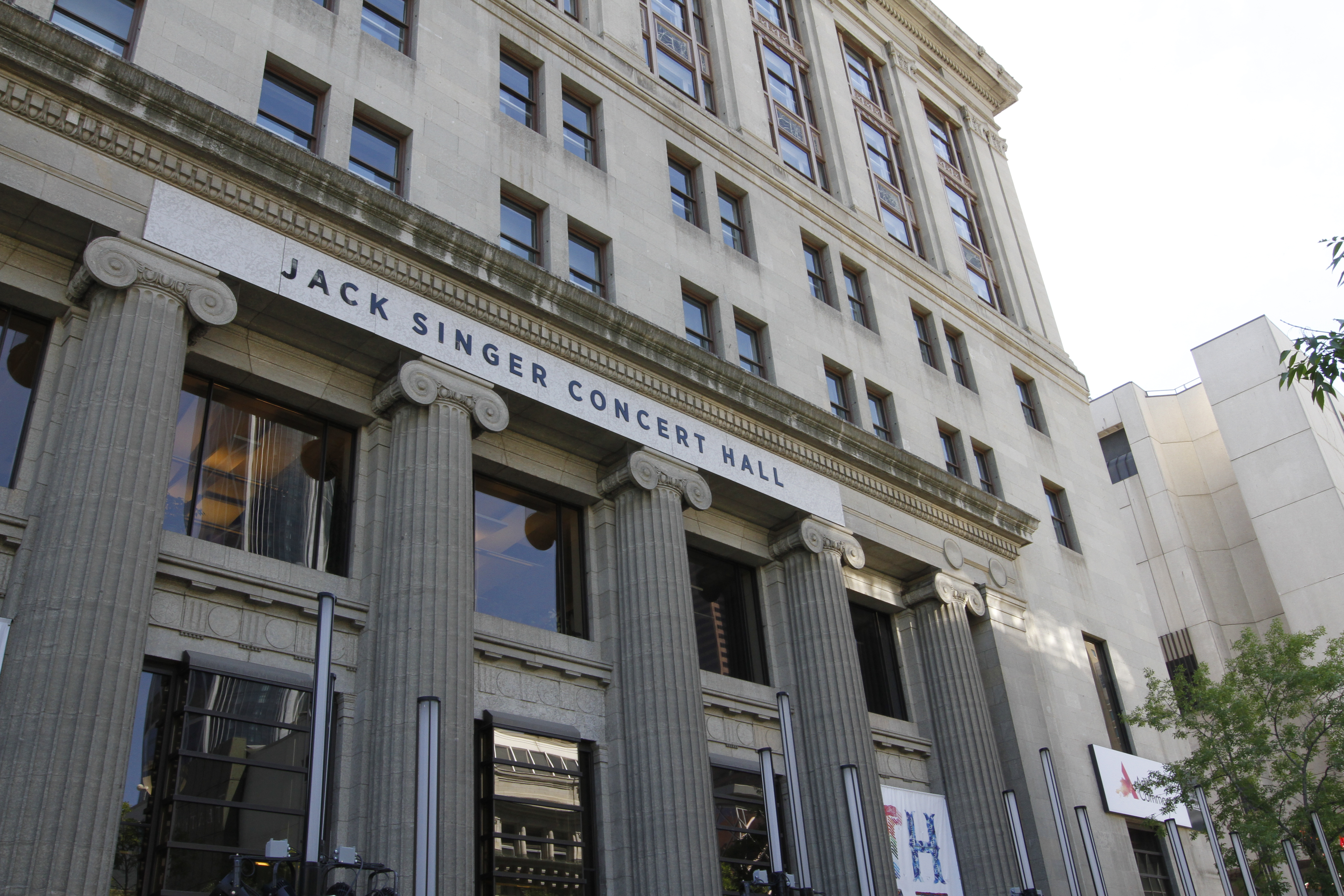
Entrance to the Jack Singer Concert Hall

Hans Graf, music director from 1994 to 2003, is currently music director laureate of the orchestra. Roberto Minczuk, who was named to the post in July 2005, served as music director from 2006 to 2016. Minczuk now has the title of music director laureate, shared with Graf.

In March 2016, Rune Bergmann made his first guest-conducting appearance with the orchestra. Based on this appearance, in July 2016 the orchestra named Bergmann its next music director, effective with the 2017–2018 season. Bergmann concluded his Calgary tenure at the close of the 2024–2025 season.

In 2022, Karen Kamensek first guest-conducted the orchestra. In September 2025, the orchestra announced the appointment of Kamensek to the newly-created post of principal guest conductor.

== Live stream ==
The CPO began live streaming some of their concerts during the 2017/2018 season.

== Music directors ==
- Henry Plukker (1955–1962)
- Haymo Taeuber (1963–1968)
- José Iturbi (1968–1969)
- Maurice Handford (1970–1975)
- Arpad Joó (1977–1984)
- Mario Bernardi (1984–1992)
- Hans Graf (1995–2003)
- Roberto Minczuk (2006–2016)
- Rune Bergmann (2017–2025)

== Recordings ==
The orchestra has made over 10 recordings for CBC Records, including the following works:

- Piano Concerti of Bartok, Prokofiev and Malcolm Forsyth (Jane Coop, piano/Mario Bernardi, conductor)
- Franz Liszt Piano Concertos (Janina Fialkowska, Piano)
- Cello Concerti of Elgar and Saint-Saëns (Shauna Rolston, Cello)
- Mozart – 12 Overtures (Mario Bernardi, Conductor)
- Mendelssohn – Symphonies 1 and 5 (Mario Bernardi, Conductor)
- Schumann – Symphonies No. 1, 2, 3 and 4 (Mario Bernardi, Conductor)
- Mahler – Symphony No. 1 (Hans Graf, music director)
- Tchaikovsky – Piano Concerto No. 1 with Pavel Kolesnikov (Roberto Minczuk, music director and Pavel Kolesnikov, piano)
- Rhapsody in Blue: The Best of George Gerswhin (Roberto Minczuk, music director)
- Beethoven Symphonies Nos. 1 and 3 (Roberto Minczuk, music director)
- Beethoven Symphonies Nos. 5 and 8 (Roberto Minczuk, music director)
