= Ermanno Florio =

Canadian orchestra conductor (born 1954)

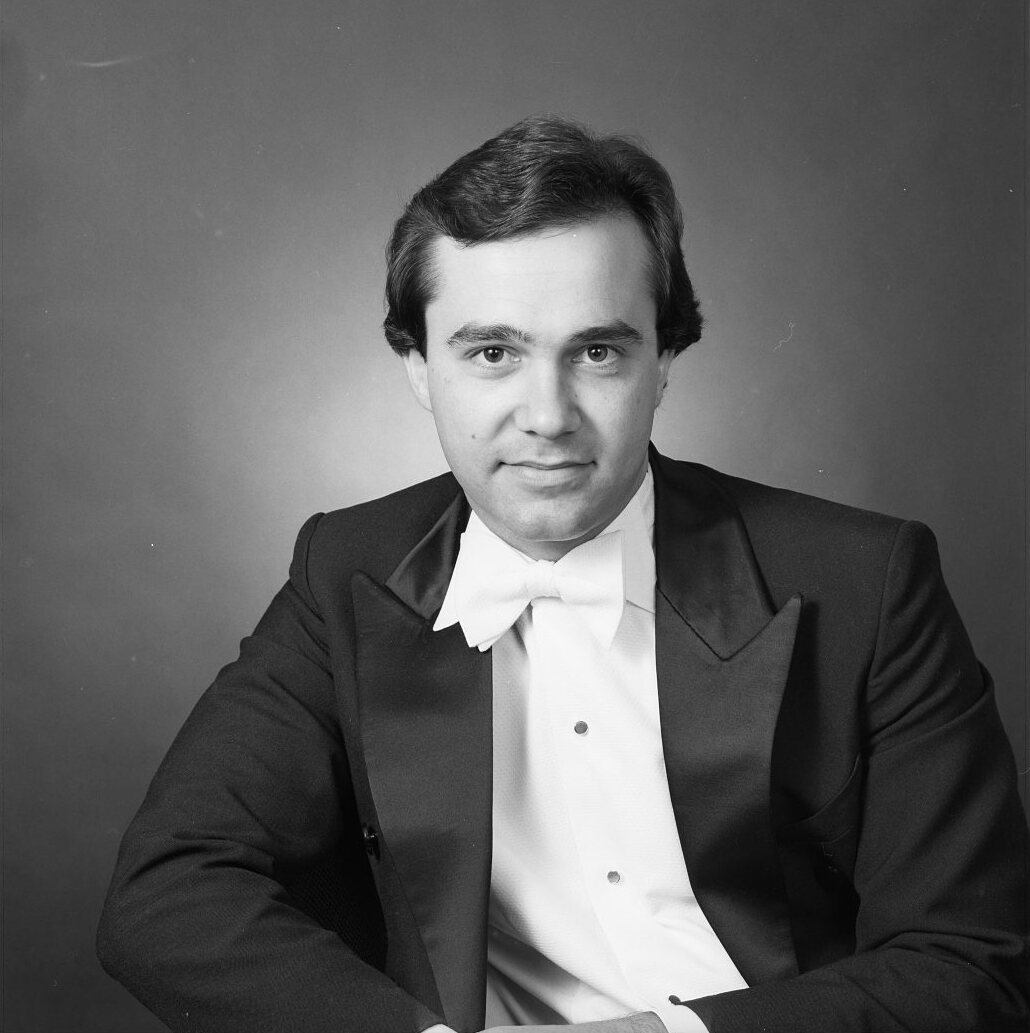
- Florio, c. 1982
- Born: March 29, 1954 (age 72); Carapelle Calvisio, Italy
- Occupation: Conductor

Ermanno Florio (born March 29, 1954) is an Italian-born Canadian and American orchestra conductor. He was music director of Houston Ballet from 1992 to 2024, and has previously held similar posts at American Ballet Theatre, Dutch National Ballet, and the National Ballet of Canada. A prolific recording artist, Florio has received honors and awards including an Emmy Award and a Cannes Classical Music Award. He is especially associated with conducting and arranging music for dance and is among the world's leading conductors for ballet.

== Early life and education ==
Florio was born in Carapelle Calvisio, Italy, on March 29, 1954, and moved to Toronto, Canada, with his parents in 1956.

From 1966 to 1973, he attended the Royal Conservatory of Music, during which time he was a violinist with the National Youth Orchestra of Canada and Canadian Chamber Orchestra. He later studied under Victor Martin at the University of Toronto Faculty of Music, from which he received a Bachelor of Music in violin performance. Following graduation, he studied conducting at the Toho Gakuen School of Music, and participated in the Ontario Arts Council's conducting program. In 1978, with the support and guidance of Sir Andrew Davis, he also studied with Franco Ferrara in Siena, Italy, before becoming the first apprentice conductor with the Toronto Symphony Orchestra. He later attended courses with Sergiu Celibidache in Madrid, London, and Munich and during the 1982 and 1983 concert seasons, attended rehearsals and performances of the Royal Concertgebouw Orchestra as a resident of Amsterdam.

Florio received awards for study at the Accademia Nazionale di Santa Cecilia in Rome and the Accademia Musicale Chigiana in Siena.

== Career ==
=== Canada ===
Following a year as apprentice conductor of the Toronto Symphony Orchestra, Florio became conductor of the Toronto Symphony Youth Orchestra from 1979 to 1986 and music director of the Niagara Symphony Orchestra from 1983 to 1995. During this time, he also guest conducted other major Canadian orchestras, including the Calgary Philharmonic Orchestra, National Arts Centre Orchestra, and Winnipeg Symphony Orchestra. In 1990 he conducted Madama Butterfly at the National Arts Centre in Ottawa. In 1985, he took his first role as a ballet conductor when Erik Bruhn invited him to become music administrator and principal conductor of the National Ballet of Canada; he held the position until 1990.

=== Europe ===
In 1990, Florio made his conducting debut at Teatro alla Scala, where he also arranged the music for Robert de Warren's La Scala Ballet's production of A Midsummer Night's Dream. For the 1990-91 season, Florio worked with Sadler's Wells Royal Ballet conducting Sir Peter Wright's Swan Lake at the Royal Opera House at Covent Garden and on an English tour.

After completing the 1991 season, Florio was a guest conductor with multiple orchestras and ballet companies in Europe. Between 1990 and 2010, he conducted seven productions at Teatro alla Scala and ten at l'Opéra National de Paris from 1994 to 2017. He was a regular guest conductor at the Grand Théâtre de Genève from 1992 to 1996, Teatro dell'Opera di Roma from 1996 to 2002, Opéra National de Bordeaux from 1997 to 2017, and Vienna State Opera from 2011 to 2020.

In 2004, the video recording of l'Orchestre de l'Opéra national de Paris's Don Quixote, which Florio conducted, won the Cannes Classical Music Award for Best DVD in the category of Concert and Ballet Recordings.

From 2004 to 2012, Florio served as music director for the Dutch National Ballet and since then has been a regular guest conductor with the company.

From 1995 to 1997 Florio conducted three productions for the Norwegian National Ballet. He guest-conducted the Finnish National Ballet in 2005 and the Royal Swedish Ballet in 2008.

=== Japan ===
From 2003 to 2010, Florio was a regular guest conductor with the New National Theatre Ballet in Tokyo. During that time, he collaborated on their world premieres of Raymonda and La Dame aux Camélias. Florio also arranged the score of "La Dames aux Camélias" for Asami Maki's production.

=== United States ===
From 1992 to 2024, Florio served as the music director for the Houston Ballet, during which time he has conducted multiple world premieres, as well as the company's standard repertoire.

From 1998 to 2001, Florio was also the music director for the American Ballet Theatre in New York City. He performed many times with the company at the Metropolitan Opera House and on their many international tours. In 1998 his recording with the company of Le Corsaire won an Emmy for Outstanding Classical Program in the Performing Arts.

== Video and CD recordings ==
- Don Quichotte with the Ballet de l'Opéra National de Paris
- La Sylphide with the Ballet de l'Opéra National de Paris
- Le Corsaire with American Ballet Theatre
- The Sleeping Beauty with Dutch National Ballet
- The Nutcracker with Dutch National Ballet
- Cinderella with Dutch National Ballet
- Onegin with the National Ballet of Canada
- The Merry Widow with the National Ballet of Canada
- Alice with the National Ballet of Canada
- La Ronde with the National Ballet of Canada
- Giselle – Pathé's worldwide cinema release with Dutch National Ballet
- Dracula – Seattlemusic
- Louis Vierne – L'Ouvre d'Orgue Intégrale – Holland Symfonia

== Music arrangements ==
Florio's music arrangements for full length story ballets include scores for:

- Patrice Bart's Tchaikovsky for the Finnish National Ballet, Das Flammende Herz for Staatsballett Berlin, Gustaf III for the Royal Swedish Ballet, and Elizabeth of Austria – Sissi for the Croatian National Ballet
- Stanton Welch's Marie Antoinette and La Bayadère for Houston Ballet
- Robert de Warren's A Midsummer Night's Dream for Teatro alla Scala Ballet
- Asami Maki's La Dame aux Camelias for the New National Theatre Tokyo Ballet

== Awards ==
- 1977 – Finalist Rupert BBC Conducting Competition
- 1998 Le Corsaire – American Ballet Theatre – Emmy for Outstanding Classical Program in the Performing Arts
- 1980 Prize Winner, Gino Marinuzzi Conducting Competition, San Remo, Italy
- 2004 Don Quixote – Ballet de l'Opéra National de Paris – Cannes Classical Music Award for Best DVD in the category of Concert and Ballet Recordings

== Personal life ==
Florio is married to Franca Kathryn Santamaura. He has a daughter, Cassandra Florio from a previous marriage, and two grandchildren.
