= George Cleve =

George Wolfgang Cleve (July 9, 1936 – August 27, 2015) was an Austrian-born American conductor. He was best known for his interpretation of Mozart.

== Life ==
Born in Vienna, the son of Felix Cleve (born Feb. 8th, 1890 in Vienna) and the former Melitta Monheit, the family emigrated from Austria in 1938 after the Anschluss, and settled in New York City in 1940. Cleve studied at The High School of Music & Art and the Mannes College of Music. He was a student of Leonard Bernstein, George Szell and Pierre Monteux. Monteux was the one who suggested Cleve as a substitute conductor for a concert at the Palace of the Legion of Honor, San Francisco, in 1960, which marked Cleve's professional debut.

== Career ==
Cleve was music director of the Winnipeg Symphony Orchestra from 1968-1970. He subsequently served as music director of the San Jose Symphony from 1972 to 1992. He was respected, but also demanding, as musicians noted:

'Notorious for his moods and angry outbursts during rehearsals, Cleve could offend his players. Gilda Mazzanti, a violinist, once said, "There were many pieces that we played with clenched teeth; if you only knew what we sometimes went through."

Wendell Rider, the orchestra's principal horn during those years, agreed that Cleve "was over the edge at times. But as far as the conducting -- it was inspiring," he said Thursday. "There was always a commitment to finding the deepest meaning of the piece. He had that channel going."'

"Mr. Cleve had a long-standing reputation as a tempestuous, even tyrannical, collaborator, but that was a function of his high standards, [violinist Robin] Hansen said. 'He was difficult, but he was harder on himself than on anyone. He was all about integrity, and if you had that, then you were a colleague.'"

In 1974, Cleve co-founded the Midsummer Mozart Festival with Robert Hubbard and Wendell Rider, and served as its artistic leader from its founding until his death. In New York City, Cleve first conducted at the Mostly Mozart Festival in 1975 and at New York City Ballet in 2000, and subsequently appeared regularly with both organisations as a guest conductor.

== Death ==
Cleve died at the age of 79 in Berkeley, California, from liver failure. He married Maria Tamburrino, a flutist, in 1986. He also has a son, Jeremiah Wiggins, from a previous relationship. His wife, son, daughter-in-law and granddaughter survive him.

Cultural offices
Preceded by Victor Feldbrill	Music Director, Winnipeg Symphony Orchestra; 1969–1970	Succeeded by Piero Gamba
Preceded by James K Guthrie	Music Director, San Jose Symphony; 1972–1992	Succeeded by Leonid Grin
