= Kelly-Marie Murphy =

Canadian composer (born 1964)

- Born: September 4, 1964 (age 61); Cagliari, Sardinia
- Education: University of Calgary, University of Leeds
- Years active: 1993-present
- Era: Contemporary
- Employer: University of Ottawa School of Music (Adjunct Professor)
- Title: National Youth Orchestra of Canada, Composer-in-residence (2007-8)
- Awards: International Horn Society Composer’s Prize (2002), Distinguished Alumni Award, University of Calgary (2004), Jules Léger Prize for New Chamber Music (2020)
- Website: www.kellymariemurphy.com

Kelly-Marie Murphy (born September 4, 1964) is a Canadian composer of chamber music and orchestral music, and adjunct professor at the University of Ottawa. She was composer-in-residence with the National Youth Orchestra of Canada (2007-8), and received the 2018 Azrieli Foundation Commission for Jewish Music and the 2020 Jules Léger Prize for New Chamber Music.

In 2025, Ottawa Chamberfest honoured her with a special celebration, ‘Kelly-Marie Murphy at 60.’

== Early life and education ==
Murphy was born in 1964 to parents in the Canadian Armed Forces based with NATO in Sardinia, and grew up on military bases across Canada. She was educated at the University of Calgary, studying with William Jordan and Allan Gordon Bell, and at the University of Leeds, studying with Philip Wilby and receiving her doctorate in composition in 1994.

That same year, she won first prize in the string quartet category of the CBC Young Composer’s Competition in Moncton, as well as the People’s Choice Award, for This Is My Voice (1993) based on the poem of same name by Leonard Cohen.

== Career ==
In 1995, the CBC commissioned Murphy’s first orchestra piece for the Winnipeg Symphony Orchestra (WSO). From the Drum Comes a Thundering Beat was premiered by the WSO under Bramwell Tovey at a concert in March 1996, and went on to place fifth at the 1996 International Rostrum of Composers in Paris.

Over the next decade, Murphy’s compositions were premiered by orchestras across Canada. Her cello concerto This is the Colour of My Dreams (1995) was premiered by Shauna Rolston with the Toronto Symphony Orchestra (TSO) in 1997; her piano concerto Hammer of the Sorceress (1998) by the Winnipeg Symphony Orchestra in 1999; her Utterances was premiered by the Edmonton Symphony Orchestra (ESO) at the 1999 Edmonton rESOund Festival of Contemporary Music, and subsequently placed third at the 1999 Alexander Zemlinsky Competition; her harp concerto And Then at Night I Paint the Stars (2002) premiered with the TSO, and went on to win the 2003 Winnipeg Centara Corporation Composer’s Competition; and her violin concerto Blood Upon the Body, Ice Upon the Soul premiered with the Kitchener-Waterloo Symphony in 2006.

She also continued to write pieces for chamber orchestra and small ensembles, including Circadian Rhythms for string orchestra (1997), premiered by the Manitoba Chamber Orchestra in 1998); Another Little Piece of My Heart for string quartet (1999), premiered by the Alcan String Quartet (later the Saguenay String Quartet); her Departures and Derivations (2001) for French horn, violin, and piano premiered at the Ottawa Chamber Music Festival, and won the 2002 International Horn Society Composer’s Prize.

In 2004, the University of Calgary honoured Murphy with its Distinguished Alumni Award.

From 2006 to 2008, Murphy was composer-in-residence with the National Youth Orchestra of Canada.

Roughly a decade later, Murphy won a commission through Symphony Nova Scotia’s 2017 Maria Anna Mozart Award for Canadian female composers, launched in 2016. The resulting piece, Dragon, Unfolding, premiered with Symphony Nova Scotia the following March.

That same year, the Azrieli Foundation gave Murphy its 2018 Commission for Jewish Music. She wrote a concerto for harp, cello, and chamber orchestra titled En el escuro es todo uno (en: In the Darkness All Is One), inspired by a Sephardic proverb and written in the tradition of Sephardic music. It was premiered by the McGill University Chamber Orchestra under Yoav Talmi, and subsequently recorded and released on the album New Jewish Music, Vol. 2 produced by the Azrieli Foundation, which also featured pieces from Srul Irving Glick and Avner Dorman, the winner of the 2018 Azrieli Prize for Jewish Music.

Also in 2018, The Women’s Musical Club of Toronto commissioned Murphy’s cello octet Coffee Will Be Served in the Living Room. The piece subsequently won the Canada Council’s 2020 Jules Léger Prize for New Chamber Music.

In 2024, Les Violons du Roy commissioned Found in Lostness, a new piece for violin solo and string orchestra for the Canadian violinist Kerson Leong, which received its world premiere in 2025.

In January 2026, the Winnipeg Symphony Orchestra announced Murphy as their new composer-in-residence, to begin in the 2026-27 season, succeeding Haralabos [Harry] Stafylakis after a decade in that role.
