= Camerata Nordica =

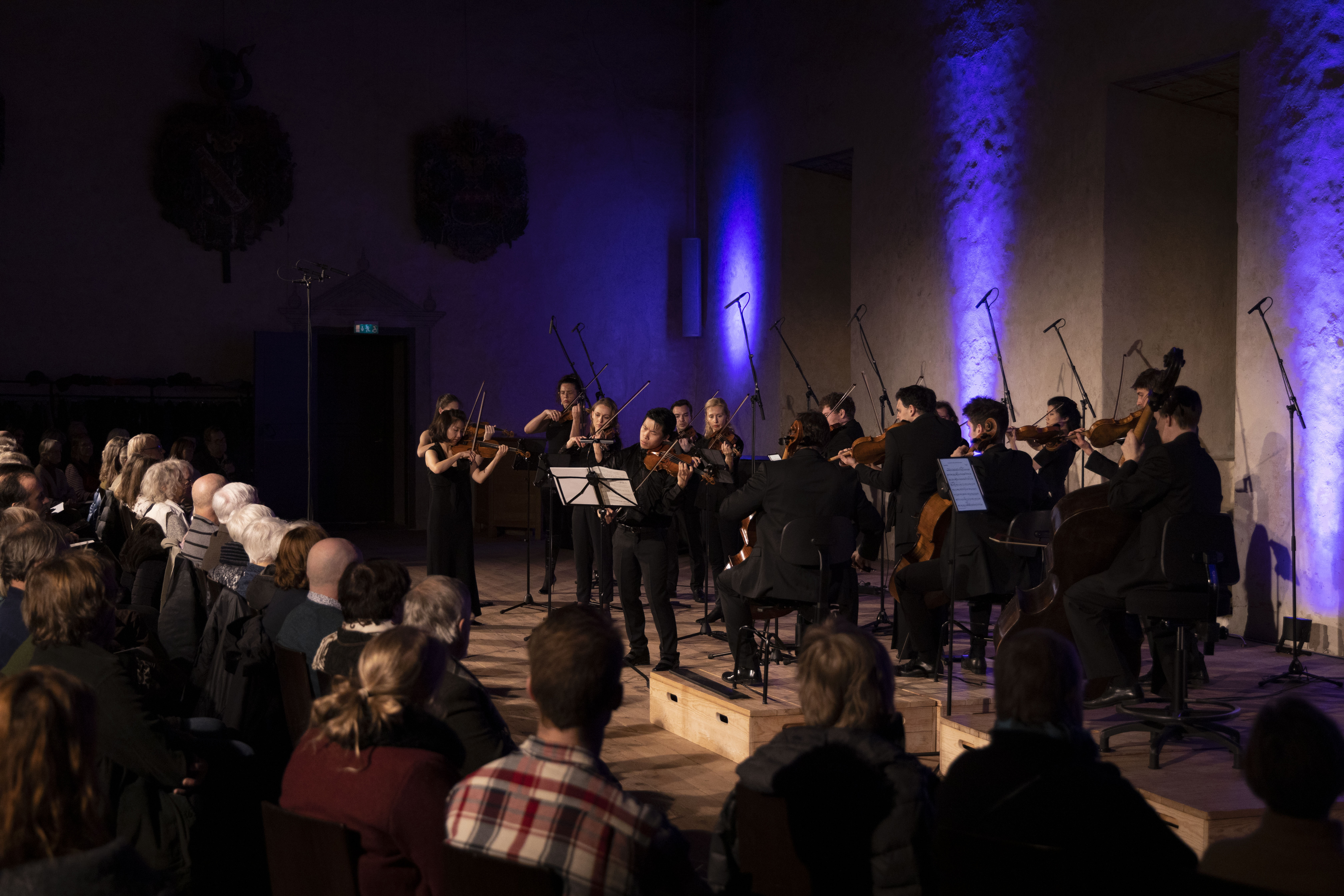
Camerata Nordica plays at Kalmar Castle together with guest soloist Kerson Leong.

Camerata Nordica is a Swedish chamber orchestra. Affiliated with the regional Kalmar Läns Musikstiftelse, the ensemble is administratively based in Oskarshamn, and gives concerts in various cities and venues in Sweden.

== History ==
Founded in 1974 in Kalmar, the orchestra has formerly been known as the Oskarshamn Ensemble, Camerata Roman (after the Swedish Baroque composer Johan Helmich Roman), and Camerata Sweden. Since 2018, Camerata Nordica's orchestra director and artistic director has been the cellist Zéphyrin Rey-Bellet.

The orchestra is unusual in that it plays in camerata form, without a conductor and standing in a tight formation, which provides energy and interaction. The orchestra consists of permanent employees and freelance musicians. The musicians are handpicked from ensembles and orchestras all over the world, often winners of international competitions. Some of the leaders with whom the orchestra has played are Norbert Brainin, Levon Chilingirian, Philippe Graffin, Giovanni Guzzo, Frans Helmerson, Barnabás Kelemen, Ernst Kovacic, Pekka Kuusisto, Josef Suk, Terje Tønnesen, Ulf Wallin, and Antje Weithaas.

Camerata Nordica has regularly toured abroad, including to England, Poland, Mexico, Argentina, Brazil and the USA, which were visited during eight tours.

== Recordings ==
The orchestra has recorded around 15 discs under its own name, including music by Anders Eliasson and Beethoven's late string quartets, arranged for string orchestra. Pianist Per Tengstrand is a soloist with the orchestra on three discs of Mozart's piano concertos.

The orchestra has recorded commercially for such labels as BIS and Caprice Records, for which for example they have recorded CDs of works by Britten and Anders Eliasson. Including recordings issued under its previous names, one source suggests that Camerata Nordica has produced some 22 recordings; the Orchestra's website says 'Nearly 30'.
