= Earl Lee =

Canadian conductor

- Born: 9 December 1983 (age 42); Yeosu, South Korea
- Occupations: conductor, cellist
- Years active: 2005–present
- Website: earlleeconductor.com

Earl Lee (born 9 December 1983) is a South Korean-born Canadian conductor and cellist.

== Early education ==
Lee was born in Yeosu, South Korea. He started piano at the age of 5, and started cello at aged 9. His entire family immigrated to Vancouver, Canada in 1995, then settled into Toronto in 1999. Lee began his career as a cellist in the Toronto Symphony Youth Orchestra. He was accepted into the Curtis Institute of Music at the age of 16; he studied cello with Orlando Cole and Peter Wiley.

Lee was diagnosed with focal dystonia when he was 24. He flew to South Korea to seek an acupuncture specialist, but did not garner results. He sought out Spanish experts in the condition, but the recovery was slow and unpredictable. He then turned to conducting.

== Continued education and career ==
After graduating from the Curtis Institute of Music in 2005, Earl Lee received his master's degree in cello performance from the Juilliard School, where he studied with David Soyer. When he began transitioning into a conducting career, he studied with Ignat Solzhenitsyn in 2010. Lee received his master's degree in conducting from the Manhattan School of Music in 2013 under the tutelage of George Manahan. His post-graduate conducting studies were done with Hugh Wolff at the New England Conservatory of Music.

Earl Lee was the RBC Resident Conductor for the Toronto Symphony Orchestra between 2015 and 2018. Lee was associate conductor of the Pittsburgh Symphony Orchestra between 2018 and 2022. Lee was named assistant conductor of the Boston Symphony Orchestra in August 2021. Lee was named the music director of the Ann Arbor Symphony Orchestra in June 2022.

== Awards and recognition ==
In 2018, Lee was awarded the 50th Anniversary Heinz Unger Award from the Ontario Arts Council, recognizing him as one of Canada's most promising emerging conductors. He received the Felix Mendelssohn Bartholdy Scholarship in 2013, chosen by conductor Kurt Masur; as a result he was invited to Leipzig to study the music and life of Felix Mendelssohn. In 2013, he also received the Ansbacher Fellowship from the American Austrian Foundation and members of the Vienna Philharmonic; this led to him spending six weeks at the Salzburg Festival.
