= National Youth Orchestra of Canada =

- Youth orchestra
- Short name: NYOC
- Founded: 1960
- Location: Toronto, Ontario
- Website: nyoc.org

The National Youth Orchestra of Canada (NYO Canada, or NYOC, French: Orchestre national des jeunes du Canada) is a Canadian youth orchestra headquartered in Toronto. The orchestra has given concert tours in every major Canadian city as well as trips to other countries, including the United States, Japan, China and countries in Europe.

== History ==
Several musicians, including Walter Susskind, then the music director of the Toronto Symphony Orchestra, and Ezra Schabas helped to found NYO Canada in 1960, for the purpose of allowing young musicians to gain experience needed to play in professional orchestras. In 1996, the delegates to the World Youth Orchestra Conference in Tokyo, who represented 39 countries, voted to award NYO Canada the "Best Youth Orchestra in the World". More than 40% of the professional musicians in Canadian orchestras have previously played in NYO Canada.

Resident conductors of NYO Canada have included Victor Feldbrill, who served in the post from 1960 to 1964, and subsequently in 1969 and in 1975. Georg Tintner conducted the orchestra for a number of years, ending in 1989. Past composers-in-residence include Kelly-Marie Murphy (2006-2008).

In 2009, NYO Canada performed its first-ever concert streamed in its entirety over the internet. In 2017, NYO Canada commissioned a large art installation titled Four Seasons of the Canadian Flag, to be displayed as part of their tour in the year of the 150th anniversary of Canada. In 2018, the orchestra performed at Young Euro Classic in Berlin and at the Edinburgh International Festival.

In December 2021, NYO Canada announced the orchestra would be led by Sascha Goetzel for 2022 and 2023, who had first guest-conducted NYO Canada in November 2019. In December 2023, it was announced that Naomi Woo would serve as principal conductor for the NYO's 2024–2025 season. Woo is the first woman to lead the orchestra since its founding.

== See also ==
- Ezra Schabas
- Walter Susskind
