= Philharmonie Luxembourg =

Concert hall in Luxembourg City

- Interactive map of Philharmonie Luxembourg
- Full name: Grande-Duchesse Joséphine-Charlotte Concert Hall
- Address: 1, place de l’Europe, L-1499
- Location: Kirchberg, Luxembourg City, Luxembourg
- Coordinates: 49°37′06″N 06°08′32″E
- Capacity: 1,500 (Grand Auditorium); 300 (Salle de Musique de Chambre)
- Type: Concert hall
- Public transit: Philharmonie-Mudam tram stop, LuxTram

Construction
- Groundbreaking: 2002
- Opened: 26 June 2005
- Architect: Christian de Portzamparc

Tenant
- Luxembourg Philharmonic Orchestra

Website
- www.philharmonie.lu

The Philharmonie Luxembourg, also known officially as the Grande-Duchesse Joséphine-Charlotte Concert Hall (French: Salle de concerts grande-duchesse Joséphine-Charlotte, German: Konzertsaal Großherzogin Joséphine-Charlotte), is a concert hall located in the European district of Kirchberg in Luxembourg City. Opened in 2005, it now plays host to 400 performances each year.

== History ==
=== Origins ===
The inspiration for constructing a concert hall in Luxembourg is closely linked to the old RTL Symphonic Orchestra, now known as the Luxembourg Philharmonic Orchestra (OPL). With the privatisation of RTL in 1992, the channel was no longer obliged to support an orchestra. The Luxembourg State decided to take the orchestra over and place it in the responsibility of an establishment specially created for this purpose, the Henri Pensis Foundation. In 1995, Luxembourg was nominated European Capital of Culture. That year, the Luxembourg Parliament made the decision to construct, amongst other new structures, a concert hall.

=== Construction ===
In 1997, Christian de Portzamparc's project was selected at the end of the international architectural competition launched by the Administration for Public Buildings. The construction work for the new concert hall was carried out between spring 2002 and summer 2005.

=== Opening ===
On 26 June 2005, the Philharmonie opened its doors to the public for the first time. 222 young musicians from different bands in Luxembourg participated in the creation of a sound installation by composer Renald Deppe. With two other creations performed on the same afternoon, this piece of work marked the start of 8 days of festivities, during which 750 musicians performed in front of more than 15,000 visitors.

On the evening of 26 June, the Salle de Concerts Grande-Duchesse Joséphine-Charlotte was officially opened in the presence of the Grand Duke Henri, representatives of the State and guests of honour from Luxembourg and abroad in an official ceremony to mark the end of Luxembourg’s presidency of the Council of the European Union. In a world premiere, the Luxembourg Philharmonic Orchestra performed Symphony No. 8 by Krzysztof Penderecki, commissioned by the Grand Duchy of Luxembourg for the occasion.

== Architecture and acoustics ==
823 facade columns of white steel line the Luxembourg Philharmonie.

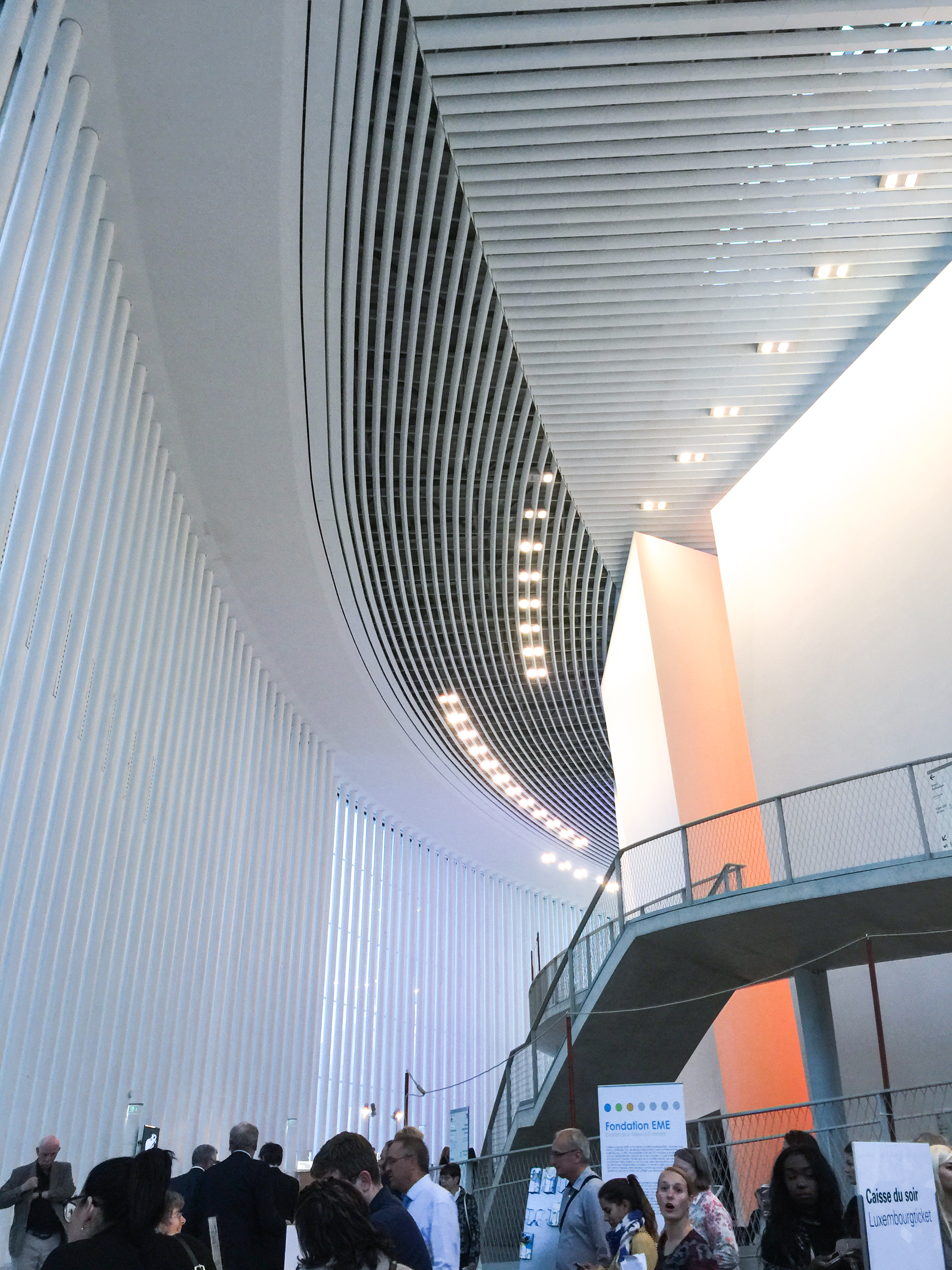
View of the main hall

Architect Christian de Portzamparc's initial idea was to mark the entrance into the world of music through a natural filter. This idea took the form of 823 facade columns made of white steel, arranged in three or four rows. The interior row of columns containing technical facilities, the second supporting the windows, and the third being of a static nature.

Between the filter of columns and the central nucleus, a vast peristyle constitutes the foyer, enveloping the Grand Auditorium. Ramps, stairs and footways lead into the concert hall, surrounding it and linking it to the boxes.

The Salle de Musique de Chambre, the ticket office and access to the underground car park are not within the main building, but are next to it outside within two aluminium-covered shells which lean against the filter of columns.

The acoustic design of the three halls is the work of Chinese-born acoustician Albert Yaying Xu with AVEL Acoustique [Jean-Paul Lamoureux et Jérôme Falala].

=== Grand Auditorium ===
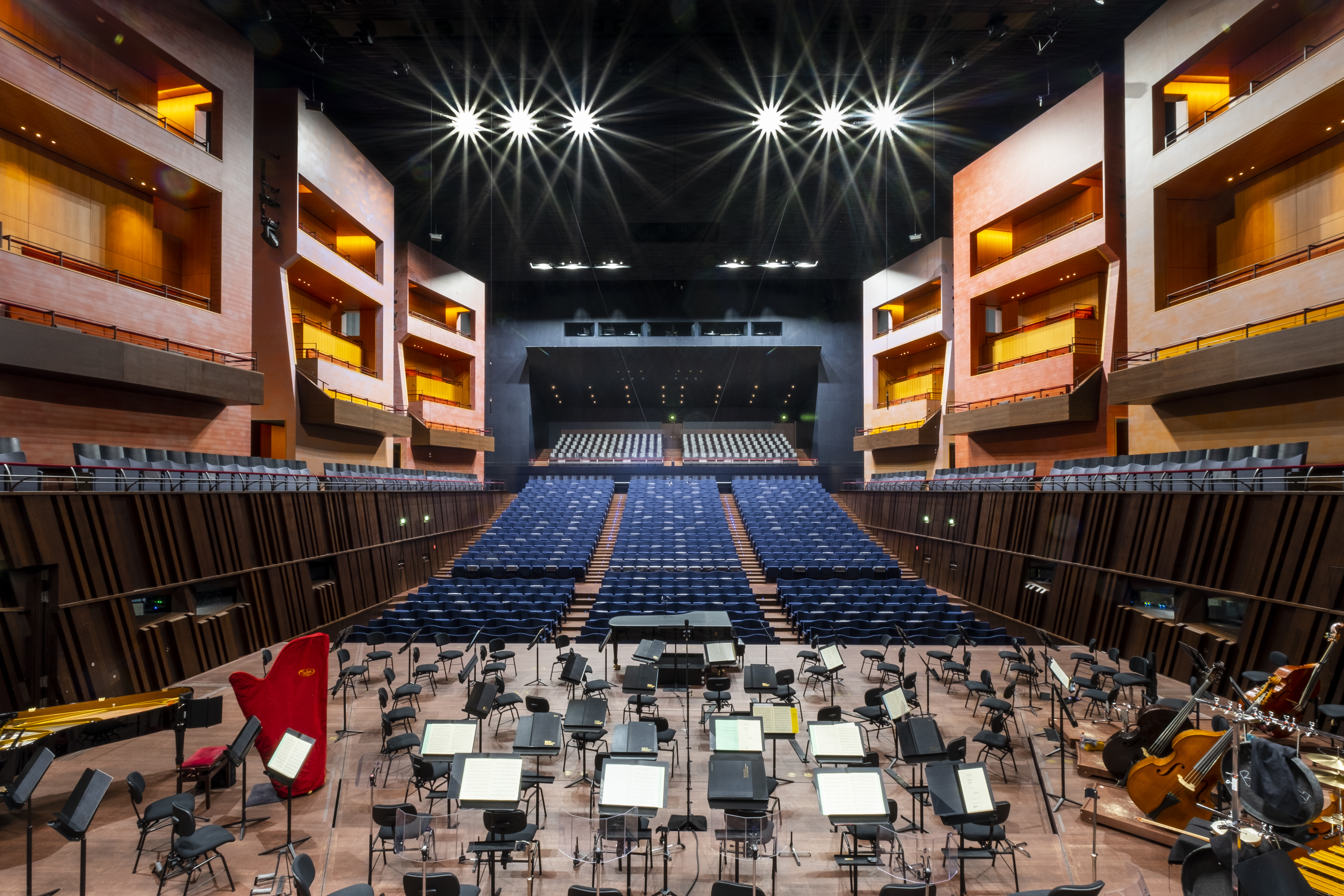
Grand Auditorium in January 2022

Designed on the concept of a "shoebox", the Grand Auditorium has a volume of almost 20,000 m3 and seats up to 1,500 listeners. To overcome the constraints of a rectangular room and to optimize the acoustics, eight towers of boxes are located around the stalls in an irregular fashion and contribute to uniform sound distribution. Like in Shakespearian theatre, the public is involved in the show with a stage visible from all sides and a choir area that can be adapted into additional seating.

The reverberation time is 1.5 to 2 seconds. The acoustics can be adapted to different musical demands, thanks to the flexibility of the stage curtains and the installation of an adjustable acoustic reflector composed of three parts. Situated above the stage, the reflector directs the sound towards the public and enables the musicians to hear each other better.

The technical design of the stage, with 21 modifiable platforms, allows for numerous stage variations depending on the formation of the concert.

=== Salle de Musique de Chambre ===
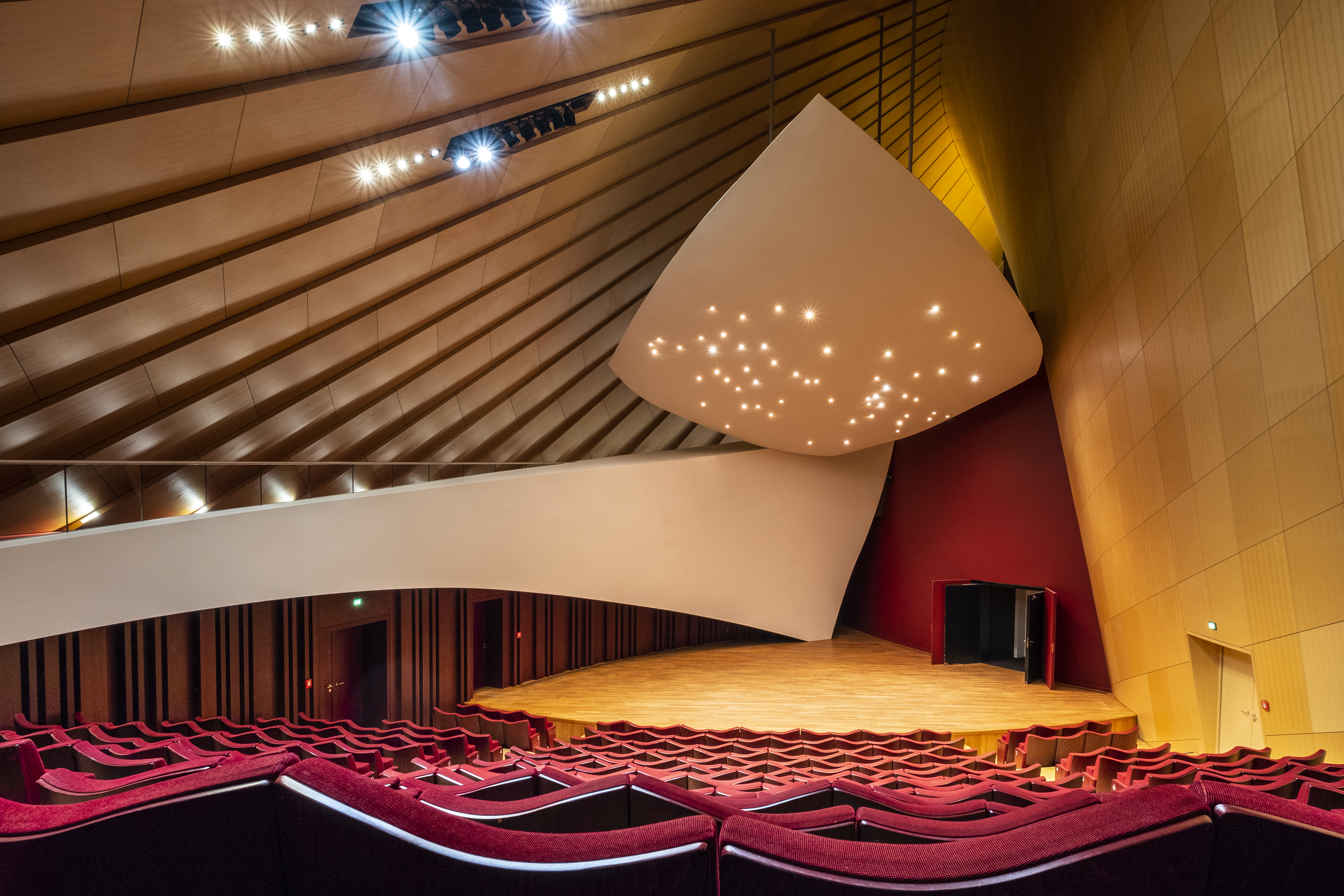
Chamber Music Hall in January 2022

The Salle de Musique de Chambre (Chamber Music Hall) seats up to 313 people. Two rounded walls in the shape of a shell and the reflector placed above the stage optimize sound distribution. Visitors access the hall through the walkway running alongside the curved wall.

=== Espace Découverte ===
Situated in the basement of the Philharmonie, the Espace Découverte (Discovery Space) stands out with its technical equipment and great versatility, and seats up to 180 people. Its acoustics can be modified thanks to removable walls. This space is used for experimental and electronic music, projects in the fields of film, art or video, for workshops, and for a large number of concerts and performances for children and young people.

== Organisation ==
The administrative structure of the Philharmonie is outlined in the 21 November 2002 law relating to the construction of a public establishment named Salle de Concerts Grande-Duchesse Joséphine-Charlotte. In January 2012 the Philharmonie and the Orchestre Philharmonique du Luxembourg "merged both artistically and administratively". The President of the Board of Directors is Pierre Ahlborn, and the Managing Director is Stephan Gehmacher.

=== Orchestra in residence ===
Since its opening, the Philharmonie has been the home of the Luxembourg Philharmonic Orchestra in permanent residence, of which Gustavo Gimeno has been its music director and conductor since 2015.

=== ECHO ===
In November 2005, the Philharmonie joined the European Concert Hall Organisation (ECHO). As a member of this network, the Philharmonie organises the "Rising Stars" series whose aim "is to bring young and exceptional young artists to new international audiences."

== Programme ==
Since the launch of its first season in September 2005, international artists have appeared the Philharmonie Luxembourg in varied programmes, including orchestra, chamber music, jazz, and new music. A large part of the programme also revolves around public concerts for the young, with different series of shows adapted to each age group, given in several languages.

Three festivals are linked to the Philharmonie:

- rainy days: hosted since 2005 by the Philharmonie, this contemporary music festival takes place each year in November
- Luxembourg Festival: organised in collaboration with the Grand Théâtre of the City of Luxembourg since 2007, it takes place at the beginning of the new season.
- Atlântico: the first edition of this festival centered around the musical traditions of Portuguese-speaking countries was held in October 2016.

The Philharmonie also hosts concerts, events and conferences organized by third parties. In 2014, 430 events took place at the Philharmonie.

== See also ==
- List of concert halls
