= Kerson Leong =

Canadian violinist

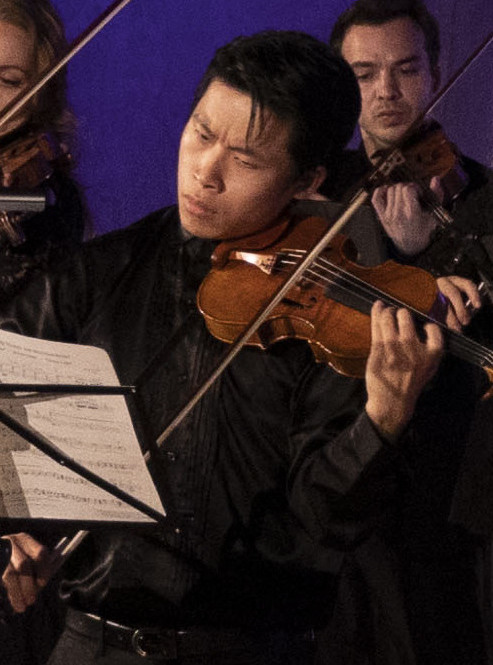
- Leong with Camerata Nordica at Kalmar Castle in 2022
- Born: 26 February 1997 (age 29); Ottawa, Canada
- Occupation: Classical violinist

Kerson Leong (born 26 February 1997) is a Canadian violinist. He has been described by Jonathan Crow, the Toronto Symphony Orchestra concertmaster, as “not just one of Canada’s greatest violinists but 'one of the greatest violinists, period.'”

== Life and career ==
Leong was born in Ottawa to a pianist mother and physicist father. He began to play the violin at age four, first receiving instruction from former Montreal Symphony Orchestra concertmaster Calvin Sieb. He soon went on to win the Grand Prize at the nationwide Canadian Music Competition for five consecutive years (2005-2009), each time receiving the highest score of any instrument or age category.

In 2010, Leong won a First Prize at the Yehudi Menuhin International Competition for Young Violinists, which led to his first European debuts and the start of his solo performing career. He was subsequently invited to perform at the Kavli Prize ceremony in the presence of King Harald V of Norway later that year.

In 2012, Leong appeared as soloist with the Vienna Chamber Orchestra performing Mozart Violin Concerto No. 4 in a special concert held at the Quirinal Palace in Rome, Italy.

In 2014, Leong won the Grand Prize at the Canadian Stepping Stone Competition and was also named Classical Revelation for the season by CBC Radio-Canada.

In 2016, Leong gave the world premiere of Visions, a piece by English composer John Rutter written especially for him to perform at the Temple Church in celebration of Yehudi Menuhin’s centenary. He was subsequently invited by Rutter to record the piece with him and the Aurora Orchestra the following summer and went on to premiere it in Australia, Hong Kong, the St. Paul’s Cathedral in London, and Carnegie Hall’s Stern Auditorium.

In 2018, Leong was invited by Yannick Nezet-Seguin to be artist-in-residence of the Orchestre Métropolitain for the season. He was also among a select group of artists who performed at the 44th G7 summit held in Charlevoix, Quebec, Canada.

In 2019, Leong gave a special performance at the Arvo Pärt Centre in Estonia as part of the Canadian delegation accompanying the Governor General of Canada to Lithuania and Estonia.

In 2025, Leong gave the world premiere of Found In Lostness, a piece for solo violin with string orchestra written for him by the Canadian composer Kelly-Marie Murphy and commissioned by Les Violons du Roy.

In 2026, Leong gave the world premiere of Les Chats, a triptych about cats for solo violin and chamber orchestra written for him by the Canadian composer François Dompierre and commissioned by Les Violons du Roy.

Also in 2026, Leong gave the world premiere of Yinyang, Concerto for Violin and Orchestra, a work dedicated to him with London Symphonia by the Canadian composer Scott Good. This 36-minute work also features the guzheng (Chinese zither) and alto flute as distinctive colors within the ensemble.

Leong was artist-in-residence from 2015 to 2019 at the Queen Elisabeth Music Chapel, where he was mentored by Augustin Dumay. Prior to that, he was also mentored by Jonathan Crow and Laurence Kayaleh, and also worked with Patinka Kopec through his participation in the National Arts Centre Young Artist Program. Leong’s approach to violin technique and music making is also influenced by physics concepts his father taught him related to string resonances in bowed instruments.

He shares many of his ideas through the “Art of Etude” series on his YouTube channel. As a pedagogue, he has been invited to teach or give masterclasses at the Indiana University Jacobs School of Music, the Sibelius Academy, the Colburn School, Avos Project – Scuola Internazionale di Musica, Western University, Orchestre de la Francophonie, Le Domaine Forget de Charlevoix, the University of Ottawa, Dalhousie University, and Memorial University of Newfoundland.

Leong currently plays the 1741 ex-Bohrer Guarneri del Gesu violin on loan from Canimex, Inc. , Drummondville, Quebec, Canada..

== Discography ==
- Bis, Analekta (2016)
- John Rutter: Visions & Requiem with John Rutter, Aurora Orchestra, Temple Church Boys’ Choir, Collegium Records (2016)
- François Dompierre: Concertango Grosso, ATMA Classique (2016, Guest Artist)
- A Tribute to Ysaÿe, Fuga Libera (2020, Guest Artist).
- Ysaÿe: Six Sonatas for Solo Violin, Alpha Classics (2021). Diapason d’Or Découverte, Choc de Classica.
- Britten Bruch Violin Concertos, with Philharmonia Orchestra and Patrick Hahn, Alpha Classics (2023). Choc de Classica, Gramophone Editor's Choice, The Strad Recommends.
- Fauré: Sonatas For Violin and Piano Transcriptions, with Jonathan Fournel, piano, Alpha Classics (2026)
