= Gustavo Gimeno =

Spanish conductor (born 1976)

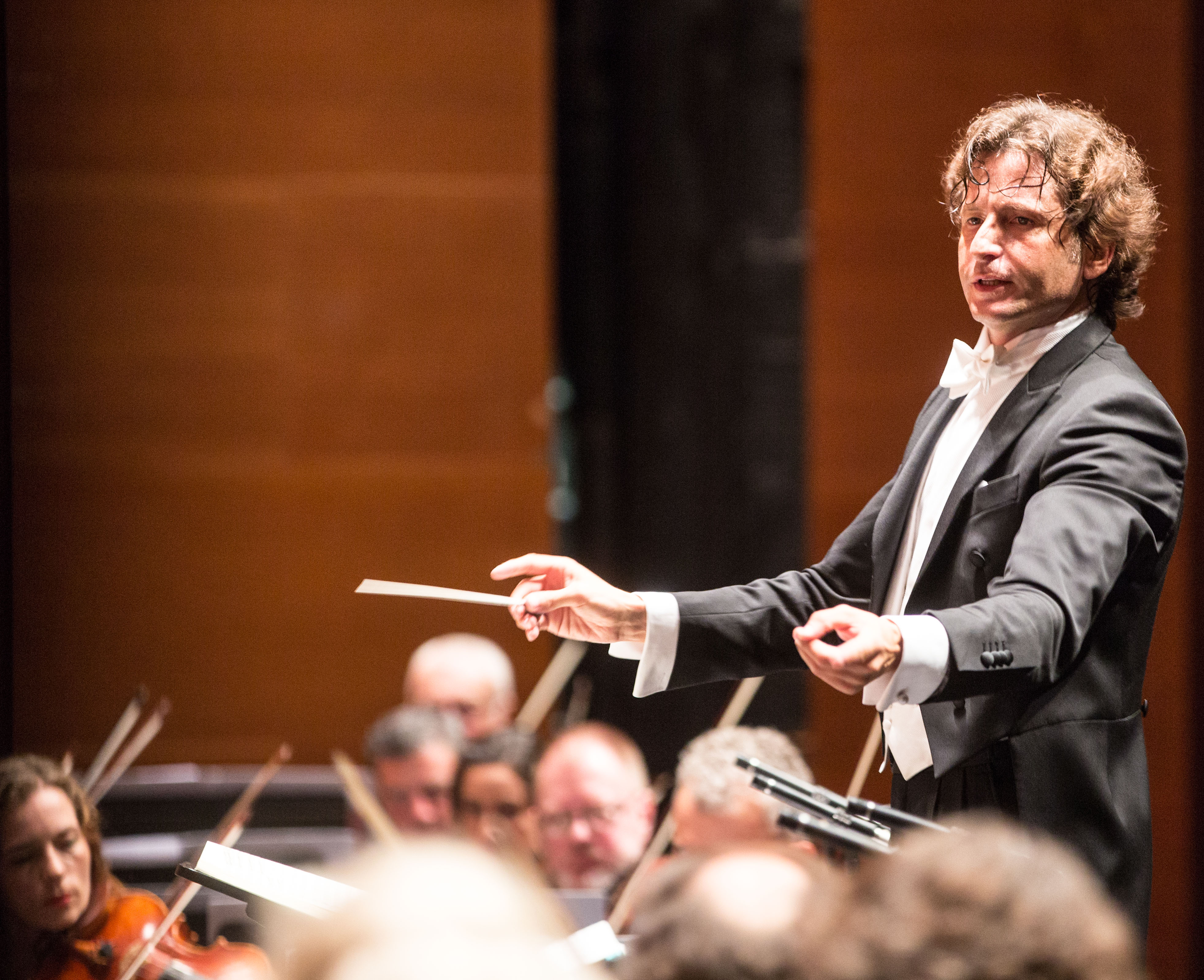
The conductor in 2017.

Gustavo Gimeno (born 1976, in Valencia, Spain) is a Spanish conductor. He is currently music director of the Toronto Symphony Orchestra, Teatro Real and Madrid Symphony Orchestra.

== Biography ==
The son of a clarinetist, Gimeno studied percussion and piano as a youth. His elder brother studied clarinet and violin.

Gimeno joined the percussion section of the Royal Concertgebouw Orchestra (KCO) in 2001, and was named principal percussionist of the KCO in April 2002. During his career with the KCO, Gimeno continued his education at the Amsterdam Conservatory, with a focus on conducting. He received encouragement and mentoring from Mariss Jansons, and became an assistant conductor to Jansons with the KCO. He has participated in conducting master classes with Ed Spanjaard, Iván Fischer and Hans Vonk. Gimeno has also counted Claudio Abbado and Bernard Haitink among his other conducting mentors. In particular, he assisted Abbado with the Orchestra Mozart (Bologna) and the Lucerne Festival Orchestra.

Gimeno gained additional conducting experience with other orchestras in Amsterdam. From 2009 to 2012, he was chief conductor of the Amsterdams Symphonie Orkest Con Brio. He then was chief conductor of Het Orkest Amsterdam from 2012 to 2013. He left the KCO in 2013 to devote his career to conducting. Gimeno came to greater international attention in February 2014 in an emergency guest-conducting appearance with the KCO, substituting for Jansons, in a concert which included the Dutch premiere of the Piano Concerto No 2 by Magnus Lindberg.

Gimeno became music director of Luxembourg Philharmonic Orchestra (OPL) at the start of the 2015–2016 season, his first full-time orchestral post, with an initial contract of 4 years. In March 2017, the OPL announced the extension of Gimeno's contract through the 2021–2022 season. Gimeno has made several commercial recordings with the OPL for the Pentatone label. Gimeno concluded his OPL tenure at the close of the 2024–2025 season.

In February 2018, Gimeno first guest-conducted the Toronto Symphony Orchestra (TSO). On the basis of this guest appearance, the TSO announced the appointment of Gimeno as its next music director, effective with the 2020–2021 season, with an initial contract of 5 years. In November 2022, the TSO announced the extension of Gimeno's contract as its music director through 2030.

In 2019, Gimeno first guest-conducted at the Teatro Real, Madrid. He returned in April 2022 to conduct their production of The Fiery Angel (opera). In July 2022, the Teatro Real announced the appointment of Gimeno as its next music director, effective with the 2025–2026 season, with an initial contract of 5 years.

Gimeno and his family live in Amsterdam.

== Selected discography ==
- Bruckner - Symphony No. 1 & 4 Orchestral Pieces. Gustavo Gimeno, Orchestre Philharmonique Luxembourg. PENTATONE PTC 5186613 (2017)
- Ravel - Daphnis et Chloé. Gustavo Gimeno, Orchestre Philharmonique Luxembourg, WDR Rundfunkchor Köln. PENTATONE PTC 5186652 (2017)
- Shostakovich - Symphony No. 1 & other short works. Gustavo Gimeno, Orchestre Philharmonique Luxembourg. PENTATONE PTC 5186622 (2017)
- Mahler - Symphony No. 4. Gustavo Gimeno, Orchestre Philharmonique Luxembourg. PENTATONE PTC 5186651 (2018)
- Debussy - La Mer. Gustavo Gimeno, Orchestre Philharmonique Luxembourg. PENTATONE PTC 5186627 (2018)
- Stravinsky - The Rite of Spring. Gustavo Gimeno, Orchestre Philharmonique Luxembourg. PENTATONE PTC 5186650 (2018)
- Rossini - Petite Messe Solennelle. Eleonora Buratto, Sara Mingardo, Kenneth Tarver, Luca Pisaroni, Tobias Berndt, Gustavo Gimeno, Orchestre Philharmonique Luxembourg, Wiener Singakademie. PENTATONE PTC 51866797 (2019)
- Franck - Symphony in D Minor & Symphonic Variations. Gustavo Gimeno, Denis Kozhukhin, Orchestre Philharmonique Luxembourg. PENTATONE PTC 51866771 (2020)
- Rossini - Stabat Mater. Maria Agresta, Daniela Barcellona, René Barbera, Carlo Lepore; Wiener Singverein; Orchestre Philharmonique du Luxembourg; Gustavo Gimeno. harmonia mundi HMM905355 (2022)
- Stravinsky - The Firebird. Apollo. Orchestre Philharmonique du Luxembourg; Gustavo Gimeno. harmonia mundi HMM905303 (2022)
- Puccini - Messa di Gloria. Scherzo for strings. Capriccio sinfonico. Crisantemi C. Castronovo, L. Tézier, Orfeó Català, Orchestre Philharmonique du Luxembourg, Gustavo Gimeno. harmonia mundi HMM905367 (2023)
- Messiaen - Turangalîla-Symphonie. Marc-André Hamelin, Nathalie Forget, Toronto Symphony Orchestra, Gustavo Gimeno. harmonia mundi HMM905336 (2024)
- Dutilleux - Tout un monde lointain, cello concerto. Symphonie n°1. Métaboles. Jean-Guihen Queyras, Luxembourg Philharmonic, Gustavo Gimeno. harmonia mundi HMM902715 (2024)
- Stravinsky - Pulcinella (Ballet). Le Baiser de la Fée [The Fairy's Kiss] (Divertimento) Toronto Symphony Orchestra; Gustavo Gimeno. harmonia mundi HMM905384 (2025)

Cultural offices
Preceded by Peter Biloen	Chief Conductor, Amsterdams Symphonie Orkest Con Brio; 2009–2012	Succeeded by Willem de Bordes
Preceded by Emmanuel Krivine	Principal Conductor, Luxembourg Philharmonic Orchestra; 2015–2025	Succeeded by Martin Rajna (designate, effective 2026)
Preceded by Ivor Bolton	Music Director, Teatro Real, Madrid; 2025–present	Succeeded by incumbent
