= San Jose Symphony =

Disbanded US orchestra

- Orchestra
- Former name: San Jose Civic Orchestra
- Founded: 1937
- Disbanded: 2002
- Later name: Symphony Silicon Valley
- Concert hall: San Jose Civic Auditorium, San Jose Center for the Performing Arts
- Website: web.archive.org/web/19980110133042/http://sanjosesymphony.org:80/

The San Jose Symphony Orchestra was a symphony orchestra performing in San Jose, California. It performed in the Civic Auditorium through 1971, and the Center for the Performing Arts afterwards until its suspension in 2001 and dissolution in 2002.

A group calling itself the San Jose Symphony first performed in 1879, but its existence was scattered and irregular until a formal symphony association was formed in 1937. A more regularly organized group, at first calling itself the San Jose Civic Orchestra, began playing that year and, except for a suspension during World War II, continued until 2001. At first it was a volunteer group playing only one or two concerts a year. Following the war, the musicians were paid, but 3 concerts a year was normal until the mid-1960s, after which the number began to rise. The 1975–76 season, a bicentennial special featuring appearances by Alan Hovhaness, Carlos Chavez, Aaron Copland, Virgil Thomson, John Cage, and Lou Harrison conducting their own works commissioned by the orchestra. It was a landmark on the orchestra's path to full-time professional status. In 1995, cellist Nick Dargahi and Operations Manager Michael Pastreich partnered to create for the San Jose Symphony the first website of any US orchestra.

In October 2001, the San Jose Symphony closed its doors in a bid to restructure. But when, more than a year later, the organization was unable to recover San Jose Symphony declared Chapter 7 bankruptcy and was dissolved.

Symphony Silicon Valley, an orchestra under new management but including many of the same musicians, was created in 2002 by Ballet San Jose and succeeded the San Jose Symphony as the professional symphony orchestra of San Jose. Symphony Silicon Valley was renamed Symphony San Jose in 2021.

== Music directors ==
| 1937–1942 | William Van den Burg |
| 1946–1947 | Edward Azhderian |
| 1947–1951 | Gastone Usigli |
| 1951–1970 | Sandor Salgo |
| 1970–1972 | James K. Guthrie |
| 1972–1992 | George Cleve |
| 1992–2001 | Leonid Grin |

== Administrators ==
- 1993-1998 Shirley Lewis (President)
- 1999 Mary Lonich (General Manager)
- 2000-2001 Paul Chummers (executive director)
