= Shauna Rolston =

Canadian cellist

Shauna Rolston is a Canadian cellist.

Rolston was a cello child prodigy who attended the Geneva Conservatory in Switzerland at age fourteen. She studied with Pierre Fournier, and later at the Britten-Pears School in Aldeburgh (England) where she also studied with William Pleeth. At sixteen, she played at New York's Town Hall, with her mother at the piano. Following her formative studies at the Banff Centre and abroad, Rolston earned undergraduate (Art) and graduate (Music) degrees at Yale where she studied with Aldo Parisot.

Rolston is an advocate for new music, and has premiered a number of works written for her. Composers who have written for her include Kelly-Marie Murphy, Heather Schmidt, Oskar Morawetz, Bruce Mather, Christos Hatzis and Chan Ka Nin, as well as Krzysztof Penderecki, Gavin Bryars, Mark Anthony Turnage, Rolf Wallin, Augusta Read Thomas, Karen Tanaka, and Gary Kulesha.

Rolston has performed and recorded with, among others, the Gallois Quintet, and pianist Menahem Pressler.

In 1994 Shauna Rolston joined the music faculty of the University of Toronto where she is a Professor and Head of the String Department. She is also a regular Visiting Artist for the Music and Sound Programs at the Banff Centre.

== Discography ==
- The Romantic Cello, 1983
- Morawetz, Bruch, Fauré, Dvořák, Bliss, 1991
- Saint-Saëns: Chamber Works, 1994
- Cello Sonatas, 1995
- Elgar and Saint-Saëns: Cello Concertos, 1995
- Intimate Baroque, 1995
- Strauss, Debussy and Barber Sonatas, 1995
- Squeezplay, 1997
- Les Disques SRC Collection, 1999
- Shauna Rolston, Cello, 2001
- This Is the Colour of My Dreams, 2001
- Dreamscape, 2007
