= Symphony San Jose =

American symphony orchestra in San Jose, California

- Orchestra
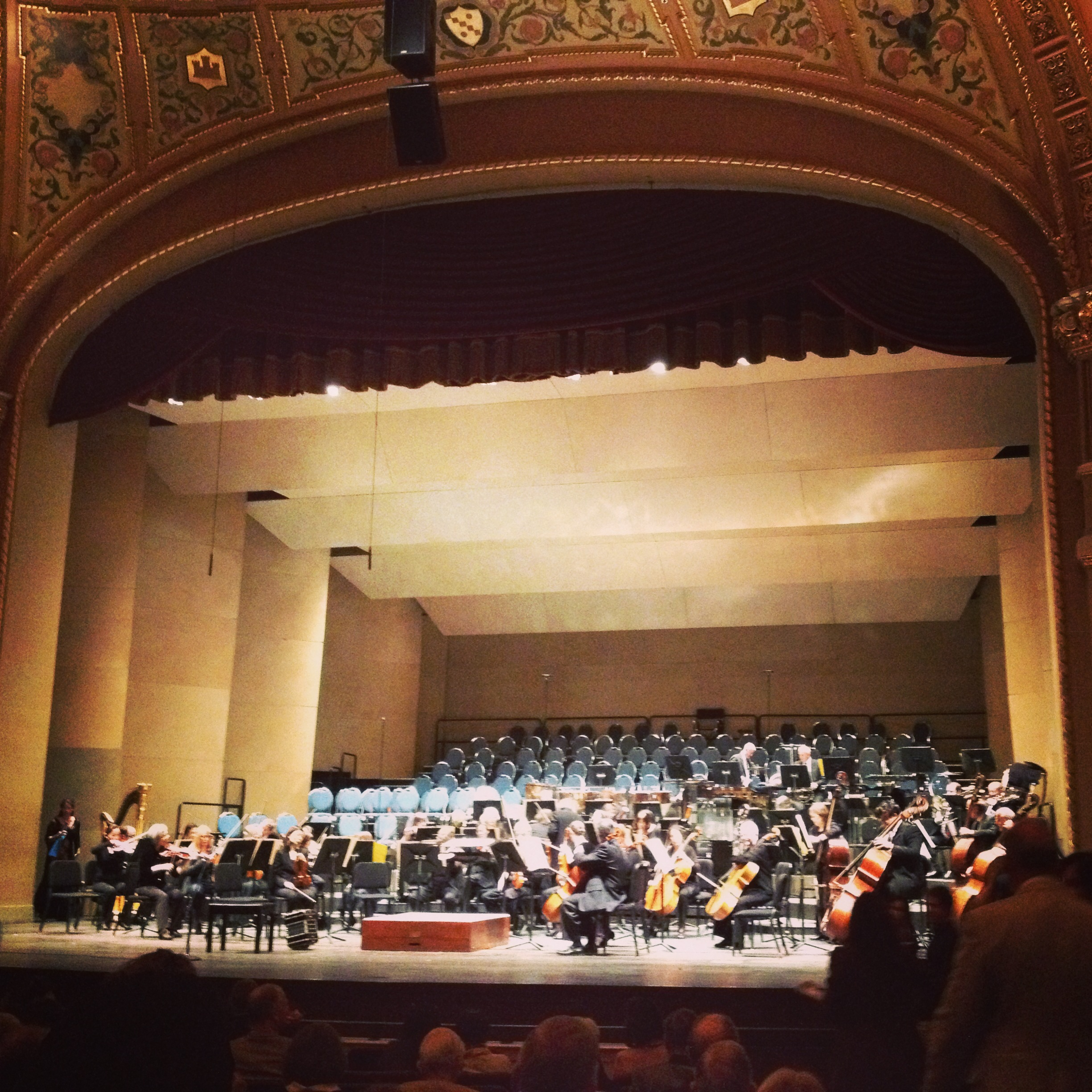
- The symphony in 2014
- Former name: Symphony Silicon Valley
- Founded: 2002
- Location: San Jose, California
- Concert hall: California Theatre
- Website: www.symphonysanjose.org

Symphony San Jose (known as Symphony Silicon Valley prior to 2021) is the professional symphony orchestra of San Jose and the South Bay region of the San Francisco Bay Area. Founded in 2002 following the demise of the San Jose Symphony, the orchestra debuted to rave reviews and standing ovations on November 23, 2002, at the San Jose Center for the Performing Arts. Started initially by Ballet San Jose as a way to keep their core musicians employed and in town after the closure of the San Jose Symphony, the orchestra was so successful that it was spun off as its own separate nonprofit organization after the first year.

== Background ==
San Jose has a long history of symphonic music, beginning in 1877 when the town was nothing more than a small collection of homes in a dusty agricultural valley. A group calling itself the San Jose Symphony first performed two years later, and concerts continued to appear irregularly over the years, so, although a continuous history did not begin until 1937, the city has a long history of symphonic music. (Claims that the orchestra had been continuously operating since 1879 are municipal puffery and not accurate.) In October 2001, the San Jose Symphony closed its doors in an attempt to restructure. However, the organization was unable to recover, and San Jose Symphony declared Chapter 7 bankruptcy and was dissolved in late 2002.

A new orchestra was founded in 2002 by Andrew Bales as part of the Ballet San Jose, in an effort to keep many of the old San Jose Symphony union musicians employed and in-town. This Ballet orchestra, which had 75 musicians, was spun off into a standalone orchestra and branded as Symphony Silicon Valley in 2003.

== Growth ==
What started as a four performance season in 2002 has today grown into 20 classical performances per year. With the addition of the orchestra's Broadway In Concert season of lighter fare in the 2009/2010 season, the company increased the number of days of work for the musicians by 40%. In addition to these two core seasons, the symphony accompanies most Ballet San Jose performances, produces the free outdoor Target Summer Pops festival, and performs special engagements in venues such as Villa Montalvo, Lake Cunningham Park, Discovery Meadow, San Francisco's Masonic Auditorium and Moscone Center and the Ritz-Carlton Half Moon Bay. The symphony frequently acts as the backing orchestra for special events and headline artists such as Video Games Live and Frank Sinatra Jr. and has performed a number of world premieres.

In 2004, the orchestra moved to their new home, the magnificently restored California Theatre. In 2005 when the San Jose State University Community Chorus was displaced from their university home, Symphony Silicon Valley took on the chorus as the Symphony Silicon Valley Chorale.

In 2021, the orchestra changed their name to Symphony San Jose.

== Fiscal Responsibility ==
Symphony San Jose was founded on the principle of market responsiveness. This principle has kept the orchestra in the black every year of its existence and also seen it bring in a much higher earned income ratio than its competitors. The organization also believes in paying a fair wage to its musicians, stagehands, and staff and employs musicians from the American Federation of Musicians and stagehands and ushers from the International Alliance of Theatrical Stage Employees.

== California Theatre ==
Originally opened in 1927, the California Theatre was designed by Weeks and Day, noted architects of the nearby Sainte Claire Hotel, Oakland's Fox Theatre, and San Francisco's Mark Hopkins Hotel. After years of neglect, the Vaudeville and movie palace finally closed in 1973. It remained vacant and was almost lost through neglect, though purchased by the San Jose Redevelopment Agency in 1985. In 2001, work began in earnest to restore it to its 1920s glory and adapt it for use as a modern opera house and concert hall. The theatre reopened on September 17, 2004, to great acclaim and the symphony opened their first concert in the hall on October 9, 2004. Today after a $75 Million renovation and expansion, the theater seats 1,119 and has some of the finest acoustics in the Bay Area.
