= Leopold Hager =

Austrian conductor (born 1935)

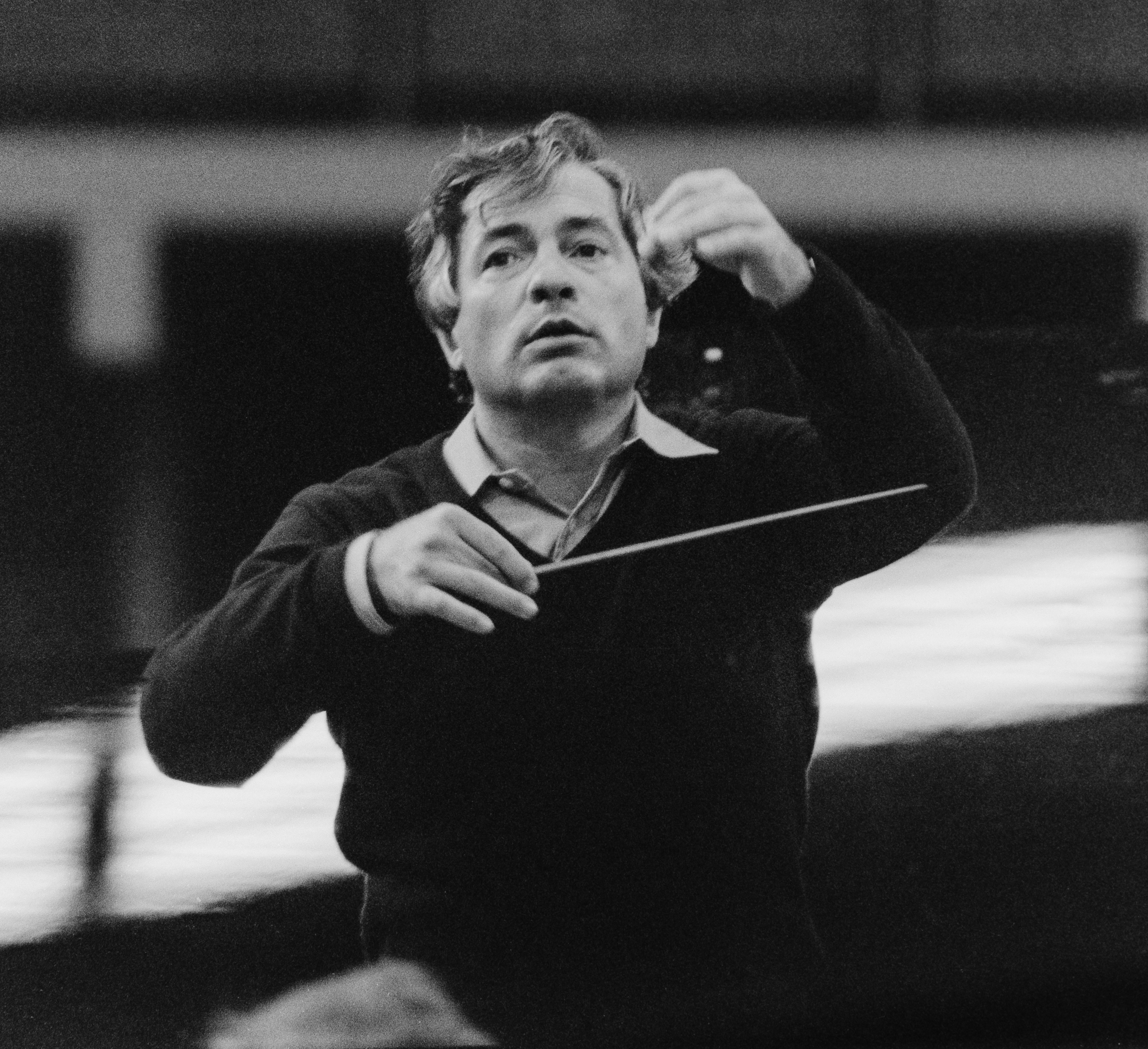
Leopold Hager at a rehearsal with the Bamberg Symphony Orchestra in the Dominikanerbau in Bamberg

Leopold Hager (born 6 October 1935, Salzburg) is an Austrian conductor known for his interpretations of works by the Viennese Classics (Haydn, Mozart, Beethoven and Schubert).

Hager studied piano, organ, harpsichord, conducting, and composition at the Salzburg Mozarteum (1949–1957). He was appointed assistant conductor at the Stadttheater Mainz (1957–1962) and, after conducting the Linz Landestheater (1962–1964), he was appointed first conductor of the Cologne Opera (1964–1965). He then served as Generalmusikdirektor in Freiburg im Breisgau (1965–1969), chief conductor of the Mozarteum Orchestra and of the Landestheater in Salzburg (1969–1981). In October 1976 he debuted at the Metropolitan Opera in New York, conducting Le nozze di Figaro. He also appeared as a guest conductor with other opera houses as well as orchestras in Europe (Berlin Philharmonic, Vienna Philharmonic) and the United States. In 1981, he became music director of the Orchestre Symphonique de Radio-Télé-Luxembourg (now the Luxembourg Philharmonic Orchestra), and concluded his tenure there in 1996.

Until 2004, Hager taught Orchestral Conducting at University of Music and Performing Arts, Vienna, continuing a direct line of renowned teachers including Clemens Krauss, Hans Swarowsky, and succeeding Österreicher.

From 2005 to 2008, Leopold Hager served as Chief Conductor at the Vienna Volksoper, conducting their new productions of The Magic Flute, La Traviata, Die Meistersinger von Nürnberg, Les Contes d'Hoffman and Turandot.

Composer

Leopold Hager's Violin Concerto (1954) is a three movement work that was premiered in Innsbruck in1956 with Friedrich Cerha as soloist. A recording of the composer conducting the RTL Orchestra of Luxembourg, with the French violinist, Lilia Beretti, as soloist was released commercially in 1993 by WLF Productions (catalogue number SEL 93.105).

Preceded by Mladen Bašić	Music Director, Mozarteum Orchestra of Salzburg; 1969–1981	Succeeded by Hans Graf
Preceded by Louis de Froment	Music Director, RTL Grand Symphony Orchestra; 1981–1996	Succeeded by David Shallon
