= Luxembourg Philharmonic Orchestra =

- Radio orchestra (1933); Symphony orchestra (1996)
- Native name: Luxembourgish: Lëtzebuerger philharmoneschen Orchester; French: Orchestre philharmonique du Luxembourg; German: Philharmonisches Orchester von Luxemburg
- Short name: OPL
- Former name: RTL Grand Symphony Orchestra (1933–1996)
- Founded: 1933; 93 years ago
- Location: Luxembourg City, Luxembourg
- Concert hall: Philharmonie Luxembourg
- Principal conductor: Martin Rajna
- Website: Official website

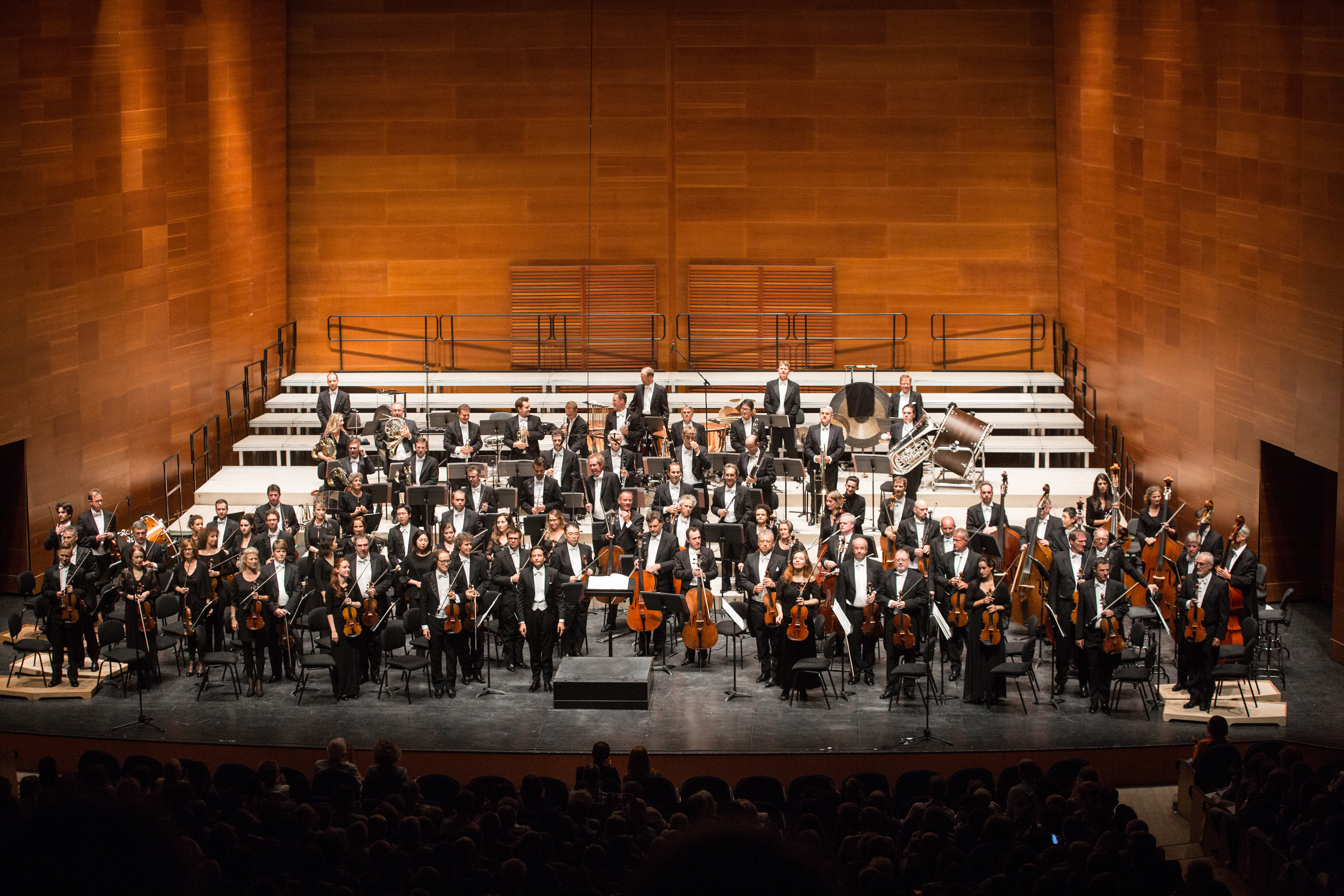
The orchestra appears at the Quincena Musical de San Sebastián, 2017

The Luxembourg Philharmonic Orchestra (Luxembourgish: Lëtzebuerger philharmoneschen Orchester, French: Orchestre philharmonique du Luxembourg, German: Philharmonisches Orchester von Luxemburg), abbreviated to OPL, is a symphony orchestra based in Luxembourg City, Luxembourg. The orchestra formerly performed at the Grand Théâtre de la Ville de Luxembourg and the Conservatoire de Luxembourg. Its current home is the Philharmonie Luxembourg, a large concert hall opened in 2005 in the Kirchberg district in the northeast of the city.

== History ==
The orchestra was founded in 1933 as the in-house orchestra of RTL Radio, named the RTL Grand Symphony Orchestra (French: Grand orchestre symphonique de RTL); Henri Pensis was its founder and first music director. After his initial tenure from 1933 to 1939, Pensis went into exile in the USA in the wake of World War II. He returned to Luxembourg in 1946 to resume direction of the orchestra. After Pensis died in 1958, Carl Melles was the orchestra's music director from 1958 to 1960. Louis de Froment subsequently became music director and held the post from 1960 to 1980. Leopold Hager succeeded de Froment in 1980 and held the post to 1996.

Following the 1991 privatisation of the Compagnie Luxembourgeoise de Radiodiffusion, in 1995, RTL decided not to renew its contract with the orchestra. Subsequently, the Luxembourg government established the Henri Pensis Foundation to allow for the orchestra to continue its existence. In 1996, the orchestra acquired its current name under its new auspices.

The orchestra's fifth music director, David Shallon suddenly died in 2000 while on tour in Japan. Bramwell Tovey succeeded Shallon as music director in September 2002, and held the post until 2006. The OPL appointed Emmanuel Krivine as their music director starting from the 2005–2006 season. In May 2009, Krivine extended his contract with the orchestra through the 2014–2015 season. Krivine concluded his OPL tenure at the end of the 2014–2015 season.

In June 2014, the OPL announced the appointment of Gustavo Gimeno as its next principal conductor, as of the 2015–2016 season, with an initial contract of 4 years. In March 2017, the OPL announced the extension of Gimeno's contract through the 2021–2022 season. In February 2020, the OPL announced a further extension of Gimeno's contract through the 2024–2025 season. Gimeno concluded his OPL tenure at the close of the 2024–2025 season.

In November 2024, Martin Rajna first guest-conducted the OPL. On the basis of this appearance, in January 2025, the OPL announced the appointment of Rajna as its next chief conductor, effective with the 2026-2027 season, with an initial contract of four seasons.

== Music directors ==
- Henri Pensis (1933–1939; 1946–1958)
- Carl Melles (1958–1960)
- Louis de Froment (1960–1980)
- Leopold Hager (1980–1996)
- David Shallon (1997–2000)
- Bramwell Tovey (2002–2006)
- Emmanuel Krivine (2006–2015)
- Gustavo Gimeno (2015–2025)
- Martin Rajna (2026–present)

== Selected discography ==
- Debussy – La Mer. Gustavo Gimeno, Orchestre Philharmonique du Luxembourg. Pentatone PTC 5186627 (2018).
- Stravinsky – The Rite of Spring. Gustavo Gimeno, Orchestre Philharmonique du Luxembourg. Pentatone PTC 5186650 (2018).
- Mahler – Symphony No. 4. Gustavo Gimeno, Miah Persson, Orchestre Philharmonique du Luxembourg. Pentatone PTC 5186651 (2018).
- Ravel – Daphnis et Chloé. Gustavo Gimeno, Orchestre Philharmonique du Luxembourg, WDR Rundfunkchor Köln. Pentatone PTC 5186652 (2017).
- Shostakovich – Symphony No. 1 and other short works. Gustavo Gimeno, Orchestre Philharmonique du Luxembourg. Pentatone PTC 5186622 (2017).
- Bruckner – Symphony No. 1 and Four Orchestral Pieces. Gustavo Gimeno, Orchestre Philharmonique du Luxembourg. Pentatone PTC 5186613 (2017).
