= Ann Arbor Symphony Orchestra =

- Orchestra
- Short name: A2SO
- Founded: 1928; 98 years ago
- Location: Ann Arbor, United States
- Concert hall: Hill Auditorium; Michigan Theater (Ann Arbor, Michigan)
- Music director: Earl Lee
- Website: www.a2so.com

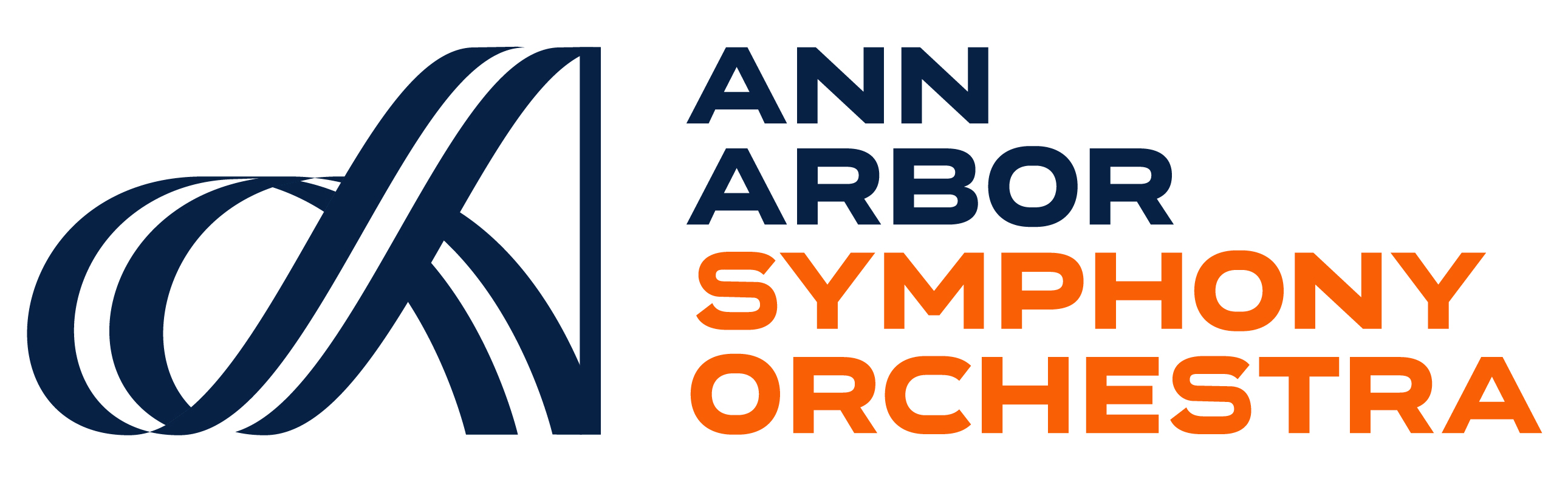
The Ann Arbor Symphony Orchestra logo

Scene from A2SO's "Petting Zoo"

The Ann Arbor Symphony Orchestra (A2SO) is an American orchestra based in Ann Arbor, Michigan. It is one of two symphony orchestras in Southeast Michigan alongside the Detroit Symphony Orchestra. Founded in 1928, the A2SO plays most of its concerts at the Michigan Theater and at the University of Michigan's Hill Auditorium.

== History ==
The A2SO began as a community orchestra in Ann Arbor, Michigan, in 1928. From 1935 to 1985, the Ann Arbor Civic Orchestra, renamed the Ann Arbor Civic Symphony Orchestra in 1952, provided concerts free of charge to the Ann Arbor Community in area school auditoriums, the Hill Auditorium at the University of Michigan, the Michigan Theater, and the West Park Shell in Ann Arbor's West Park. The orchestra maintained a commitment to Ann Arbor artists to encourage youth involvement in music, and bring live, classical symphonic music to the city of Ann Arbor. They often teamed with other artistic and musical organizations like the Women's Chorale and the Ann Arbor Civic Ballet. By 1981, the orchestra had grown to 100 members. During this time, the orchestra had ten conductors, Warren Ketcham (1929–1931), Frederick Ernst (1931–1933), William Champion (1933–1941), Joseph E. Maddy (1941–1951), Orient Daley (1951–1955), Emil Raab (1955–1957), George C. Wilson (1957–1961), William Fitch (1961–1963), Emil Holz (1963–1972), and Edward Szabo (1972–1985).

Throughout its history, the A2SO has relied upon the donations of area philanthropists, and since 1952 on the efforts of the Women's Association. However, starting in the late 1960s, these monies alone could not support the rising operational costs of the orchestra. To raise funds, the orchestra began hosting events to raise both money and awareness. However, the financial problems persisted. In 1985, in a controversial decision that coincided with the somewhat abrupt replacement of conductor Edward Szabo with Carl St.Clair, the A2SO began charging admission for concerts. This move quickly resulted in a much larger budget from marketing campaigns and ticket sales. The increased budget allowed the orchestra to attain a higher standard of professionalism, which attracted better musicians and soloists, performed more concerts, and bolstered its reputation in Ann Arbor and nationally. Conductors Samuel Wong (1992–1999) and Arie Lipsky (2000–2019) continued this tradition.

The Women's Association of the Ann Arbor Symphony was formed in 1952 with the goal of assisting with concerts, providing refreshments for players at rehearsals, and raising money both for the orchestra and for music scholarships for area youth. In 1976, Mayor Albert Wheeler declared May 16–22, 1976 “Geranium Week” in honor of the Annual Geranium Sale run by the Women's Association to benefit the symphony.

The current executive director of the orchestra is Sarah Calderini.

== Music directors ==
Philip Potts was the first conductor of the ensemble and served for one year from 1928 to 1929. A year later, the ensemble solicited help from Warren Ketcham, a student at the University of Michigan's School of Music, to become their first conductor. After doubling in size, the musicians adopted the name "Ann Arbor Community Orchestra." Frederick Ernst, another music student at the University of Michigan, became the group's second director in 1931. He led the musicians in their first major performance, which included Franz von Suppé's Poet and Peasant Overture. Ernst conducted 18 performances in Ann Arbor, Petersberg, Saline, and Hartland. William Champion became the third conductor of the ensemble in 1933 and led a group of 30 musicians. In 1941, Champion was called into military service with the United States Navy. He was succeeded by the A2SO's fourth music director, Joseph E. Maddy, who had founded the National Music Camp at Interlochen and served as both supervisor of music in public schools in Ann Arbor and the Music Department head for the University of Michigan. Maddy led the group for ten years and grew the orchestra to 75 musicians. Orien Dalley succeeded Maddy in 1951 and conducted the orchestra for four years until 1955 when Emil Raab became the sixth music director. Raab conducted for two years until he was succeeded by George C. Wilson, Vice President of the National Music Camp at Interlochen, now known as Interlochen Center for the Arts.

During Wilson's time as conductor, the orchestra gave its first official youth concert to 1,500 children. Jack Elzay, the superintendent of Ann Arbor Public Schools, wrote a letter to conductor George Wilson following the concert recognizing the importance of music in children's lives. These educational concerts continue to be an integral part of the mission of the present day Ann Arbor Symphony Orchestra.

William Fitch became the orchestra's eighth conductor in 1961 and led the ensemble in its first radio broadcast on WUOM, now known as Michigan Radio. In 1963, Emil A. Holz, doctoral advisor and chairman of the music education department at the University of Michigan, became the ninth music director of the orchestra. He led until 1972 when he was succeeded by Edward Szabo. Carl St.Clair became the orchestra's eleventh conductor in 1985. With this change in leadership, the orchestra began to charge admission for the first time in its 57-year history. St.Clair led the orchestra for seven years and was succeeded in 1992 by Samuel Wong. During Wong's time as conductor, the orchestra began its annual tradition of celebrating the birthday of Wolfgang Amadeus Mozart with an all-Mozart program held every January, a tradition that continues to this day.

Arie Lipsky was hired as the A2SO's thirteenth conductor in 2000. Lipsky led the orchestra in its first performance of an opera with Georges Bizet's Carmen in 2002. Lipsky resigned from his position as music director in June 2019. In August 2019, the organization launched a music director search to name Lipsky's replacement, receiving over 225 applications from around the world. Across the 2021–22 season, the orchestra auditioned six music director finalists, each of whom conducted a classical main stage performance with selected repertoire.

On June 9, 2022, the A2SO announced the appointment of Earl Lee as the orchestra's fourteenth music director. Lee made his official debut in director capacity at the orchestra's 2022–23 season opener at Hill Auditorium, leading a program of Carlos Simon, Sergei Rachmaninoff, and Ludwig van Beethoven on September 9, 2022.

== Education and community engagement ==
The Ann Arbor Symphony Orchestra provides opportunities for music education in the Southeastern Michigan area. The A2SO presents two annual youth concerts (including a partnership with the Link Up program through Carnegie Hall's Weill Music Institute (WMI), KinderConcerts (at local libraries), ensemble performances in local schools and the community and instrument petting zoos wherein children have hands-on encounters with musical instruments. They also perform an annual concert held for middle school students, running fundraisers to offset bussing costs for attending schools with need.

For a number of years, scholarships were granted to local music students for summer music programs.
