= Maximiano Valdés =

Chilean conductor (born 1949)

Maximiano Valdés (born June 19, 1949) is a Chilean classical musician and orchestral conductor. He is the music director of the Puerto Rico Symphony Orchestra.

== Biography ==
Valdés was born in Santiago, Chile in 1949. His parents were the composer Sylvia Soublette and Gabriel Valdés, who was Chile's minister of foreign affairs from 1964 to 1970. Immediately after Valdés graduated from the Academy of St. Cecilia in 1976 he was signed by La Fenice as assistant conductor, and the following year he joined the Tanglewood Festival with the same role. After winning the Malko and Vittorio Gui competitions in 1980 he got his first principal position in the Paris Opera, which eventually led to performance in other theaters.

Valdés considers his appointment as the principal conductor of the Euskadi Symphony Orchestra and assistant under Jesús López Cobos at the Spanish National Orchestra in 1984 as the true beginnings of his career. However he remained tied to the Paris Opera, and his operatic duties led him to resign from the Euskadi Symphony. In his departing announcement he was critical with the lack of a single seat back then and instead perform in different Basque towns, and the "lack of clear ideas to propose an orchestral model", he resigned in August 1986.

The following year he was invited by the Buffalo Philharmonic's principal conductor Semyon Bychkov, who was looking for his successor. Valdés made his American debut in October 1987; in 1989, he was appointed music director of that orchestra, a position he held until 1998. From 1994 he combined it with the titularity of the Asturias Symphony Orchestra, which would eventually his main position and the one where he has spent the most years, until 2010. During the 07/08 season, Valdés toured with his Asturian orchestra. The orchestra traveled Mexico, Spain and China.

Maximiano Valdés has several recordings available and he signed on with Naxos to record works by Latin American and Spanish composers with the orchestra in Asturias.

== Premieres ==
Date	Venue	Composer	Composition	Soloist(s)	Orchestra
1986–12–19	Madrid	Conrado del Campo	Violin Concerto ^{(posthumous)}	Víctor Martín	Spanish National

== North American orchestral engagements ==
- Baltimore Symphony
- Buffalo Philharmonic
- Calgary Philharmonic
- Dallas Symphony
- Edmonton Symphony Orchestra
- Houston Symphony
- Indianapolis Symphony Orchestra
- Louisiana Philharmonic
- Montreal Symphony
- National Arts Centre Orchestra
- National Symphony Orchestra
- New World Symphony (orchestra)
- Phoenix Symphony
- Saint Louis Symphony
- San Diego Symphony
- Seattle Symphony
- Syracuse Symphony Orchestra
- Vancouver Symphony

== Other orchestral engagements ==
- Orquesta Sinfónica Simón Bolívar (1978–1982)
- Dresden Philharmonie
- Russian State Symphony Orchestra
- Sinfonia Varsovia
- Krakow Philharmonic
- Polish National Radio Symphony Orchestra
- Nice Opera Orchestra
- Lisbon Philharmonic
- Malaysian Philharmonic
- Orquesta Sinfonica d'Estado de São Paulo

== Summer festival engagements ==
- Mann Music Center
- Caramoor Festival
- Interlochen Center for the Arts
- Grand Teton Music Festival
- Eastern Music Festival
- Chautauqua Symphony
- Music Academy of the West
- Grant Park Symphony Orchestra
