= Harry Stafylakis =

Canadian-American composer and educator

Haralabos [Harry] Stafylakis
- Stafylakis in 2019
- Born: Haralabos Stafylakis; 1982 (age 43–44); Montréal, Quebec, Canada
- Occupations: Composer, educator, guitarist, producer
- Years active: 2006–present
- Website: http://www.hstafylakis.com

Haralabos "Harry" Stafylakis (born 1982) is a Canadian-American composer, guitarist, and educator based in New York City. He is the Composer-in-Residence of the Winnipeg Symphony Orchestra and co-curator of its Winnipeg New Music Festival. He is the creator of the 2023 album Calibrating Friction, which was nominated at the 2024 JUNO Awards for Instrumental Album of the Year.

== Early life and education ==
Born in Montréal, Québec, in 1982, Stafylakis began early training in classical piano. He later became a guitarist and vocalist in progressive metal bands.

In 2010, he earned a Bachelor of Music degree in composition from McGill University and in 2011 moved to New York City, where he completed graduate studies at The Graduate Center, City University of New York (CUNY).

== Career ==
Stafylakis has been the Composer-in-Residence of the Winnipeg Symphony Orchestra and co-curator of the Winnipeg New Music Festival since 2016.

He has collaborated with soloists such as Evelyn Glennie, Rachel Barton Pine, Philippe Sly, Alexandre Da Costa, Raphael Weinroth-Browne, and others.

His works have been performed by orchestras and ensembles such as the Toronto Symphony Orchestra, Vancouver Symphony Orchestra, American Composers Orchestra, Norwegian Radio Orchestra, Roomful of Teeth, JACK Quartet, Spokane Symphony and others.

In 2018–2019, he collaborated with the progressive metal band Animals As Leaders on symphonic adaptations of their music.

His composition "Source Code" appears on the Hard Rubber Orchestra album Iguana (Redshift Records), which earned a JUNO Award nomination in 2023 for Instrumental Album of the Year.

== Recordings ==
His debut solo album Calibrating Friction was released on September 15, 2023, on New Amsterdam Records, featuring collaborations with Javier Reyes (Animals As Leaders), Vicky Chow (Bang on a Can All-Stars), Raphael Weinroth-Browne, Ken Thomson, and others. Calibrating Friction has been reviewed by music outlets such as The Progressive Subway, Avant Music News, and others. It earned a nomination at the 2024 JUNO Awards for Instrumental Album of the Year.

== Awards and recognition ==
He has been awarded the Charles Ives Fellowship by the American Academy of Arts and Letters, ASCAP's Leonard Bernstein Award, SOCAN's Classical Composer of the Year, four SOCAN Foundation Young Composer Awards, and grants from national arts councils.

== Teaching and academic appointments ==
Stafylakis is part of the Music & Technology faculty at Purchase College (SUNY), and has previously taught at City College of New York (CUNY) and Nazareth University. He also directs the Winnipeg Symphony Orchestra's WNMF Composers Institute.

== Selected press and reviews ==
His music has been featured and reviewed in publications including the Winnipeg Free Press, SOCAN Magazine, and other arts press.

== Published Works ==
=== Just a Theory Press ===
- Symphony No. 3: Beyond Horizon (2026)
- Valse Kinetic (2022)
- Symphony No. 1: Holocene Extinction (2018)
- Sun Exhaling Light (2017)
- Brittle Fracture (2013)
- Piano Concerto No. 1: MYTHOS (2023)
- To wake and find the world still burning (2022)
- Symphony No. 2: Into Oblivion (2019)
- A Parable for End Times (2018)
- Source Code (2019 / 2021)
- Never the Same River (2013 / 2023)
- Incinerate (2022)
- Piano Trio No. 1: Gnothi Seauton [Know Thyself] (2019)
- String Quartet No. 4: Aftermath (2018)
- String Quartet No. 2: In Flames (2012)
- In Memory (2011)
- The Sharp End (2009)
- The Tender Scars of Memory (2024)
- Light Symbolic (2023)
- Focus (2019)
- Piano Études, Book I & II (2018)
- Sonata for Horn & Piano: Horn of Valere (2011)
- Suite for Solo Cello (2009)
- The Keats Cycle (2007 / 2010)

=== Les Productions d'Oz ===
- Hyperion (2010)
- Waves Obsidian (2008)
