= Toronto Symphony Youth Orchestra =

Canadian orchestra

The Toronto Symphony Youth Orchestra (TSYO) is an orchestral training programme for musicians under 22, based in Toronto, Ontario, Canada. The TSYO is led by the Toronto Symphony Orchestra's RBC Resident Conductor, Trevor Wilson, and coached by TSO musicians Shane Kim (Violin), Peter Seminovs (Violin), Ivan Ivanovich (Viola), Emmanuelle Beaulieu Bergeron (Cello), Christopher Laven (Double Bass), Miles Haskins (Woodwinds), Nicholas Hartman (Brass), and Joseph Kelly (Percussion). Previous conductors include Alain Trudel, who conducted the orchestra from 2004 to 2012, and Shalom Bard.

Founded in 1974 by Victor Feldbrill, the TSYO has a close partnership with the Toronto Symphony Orchestra. A collaborative on-stage performance by the two orchestras named "Side-by-Side" is held annually at Roy Thomson Hall. Additionally, all TSYO members are encouraged to compete in an annual concerto competition. The prize of this competition is the opportunity to perform as a soloist for one of the TSO's young people concerts or with the TSYO.

Through their affiliation with the Toronto Symphony Orchestra, the TYSO has worked with guest artists and conductors including: Henning Kraggerud, Vadim Gluzman, James Ehnes, Colin Carr, Pinchas Zukerman, Nadja Salerno-Sonnenberg, Pekka Kuusisto, Yo-Yo Ma, Richard Stoltzman, Wynton Marsalis, Christian Lindberg, Colin Currie, Jukka-Pekka Saraste, Günther Herbig, Maxim Vengerov, Andrew Davis, Peter Oundjian, Alison Balsom, Alisa Weilerstein, James Gaffigan, and Stéphane Denève.

The group has toured within Canada and abroad. In 1999, the TSYO represented Canada at the Banff International Festival of Youth Orchestras. In 2012, the TSYO traveled to British Columbia with performances in Vancouver, Nanaimo, and Victoria. Other destinations have included Quebec, Texas, Massachusetts, California, Japan, and Europe.

== History ==
In June 1974, a proposal by Toronto Symphony board member John McDougall for a youth orchestra under the Toronto Symphony received funding and support from the board. During its first season, Victor Feldbrill was chosen as the first music director of the TSYO. On February 2, 1975, the inaugural concert of the TSYO was performed in the MacMillan Theatre at the University of Toronto Faculty of Music.

In the summer of 1985, the TSYO toured in Europe. The orchestra performed in the Netherlands, England, and Scotland; the tour began at the International Festival of Youth Orchestras in Aberdeen, Scotland. The tour ended at the London Youth Festival, where the TSYO was the only non-British youth orchestra invited to the festival. The tour was planned to coincide with the United Nations' International Year of Youth.

== List of conductors ==
- Victor Feldbrill (1974–1978, 2003–2004)
- Leonard Atherton (1978–1979)
- Ermanno Florio and David Zafer (1979–1986)
- Nurham Arman (1986–1987)
- Joaquin Valdepeñas & David Zafer (1987–1999)
- Bramwell Tovey (1999–2000)
- Susan Haig (2000–2003)
- Alain Trudel (2004–2012)
- Shalom Bard* (2012–2016)
- Earl Lee* (2016–2018)
- Simon Rivard (2018–2024)
- Trevor Wilson (2024–2025)
- Nicholas Sharma (2025-)

*Denotes TSYO alumni.
