= Giovanni Guzzo =

Venezuelan Violinist and Conductor(born 1986)

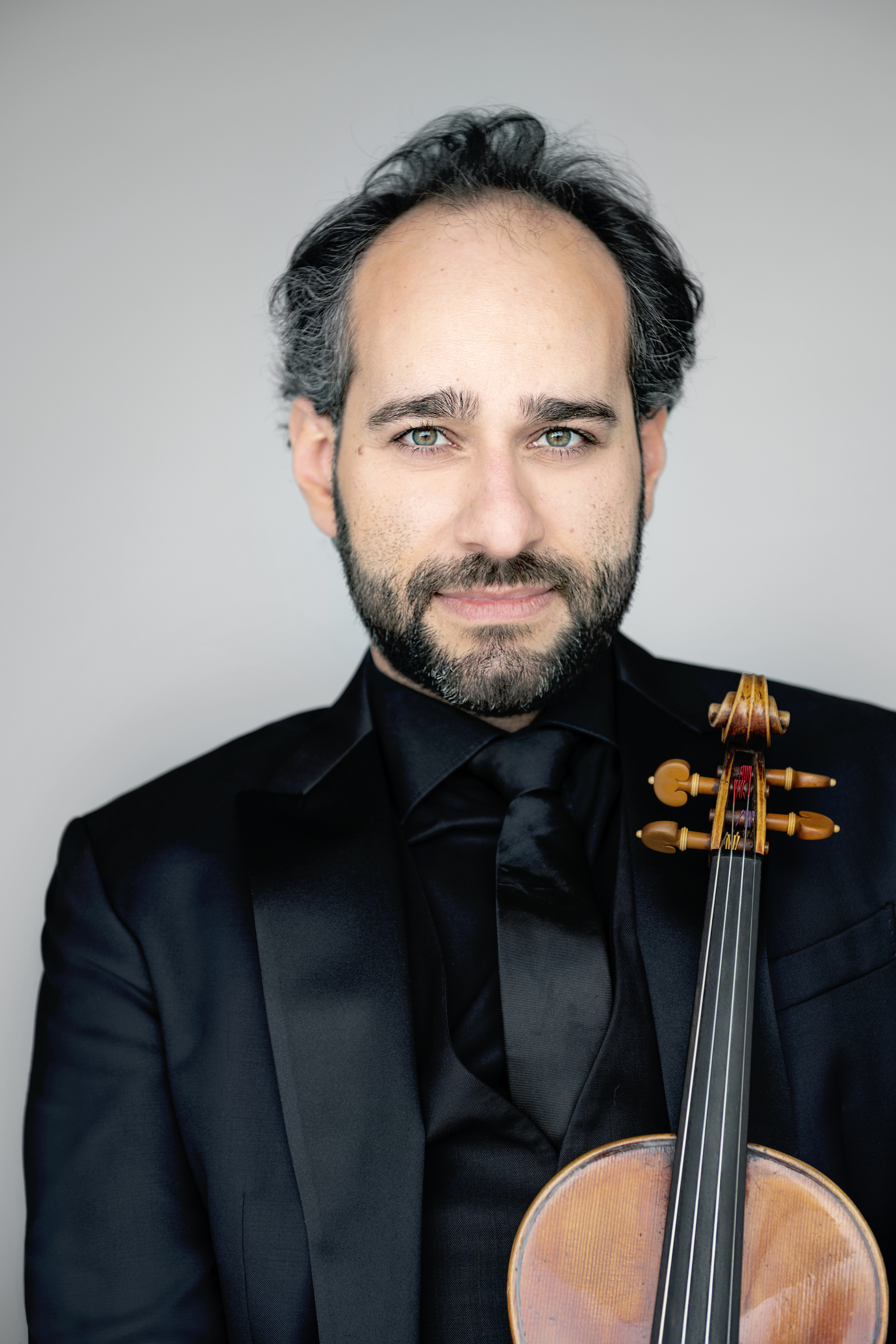
Giovanni Guzzo, photo by Neda Navaee

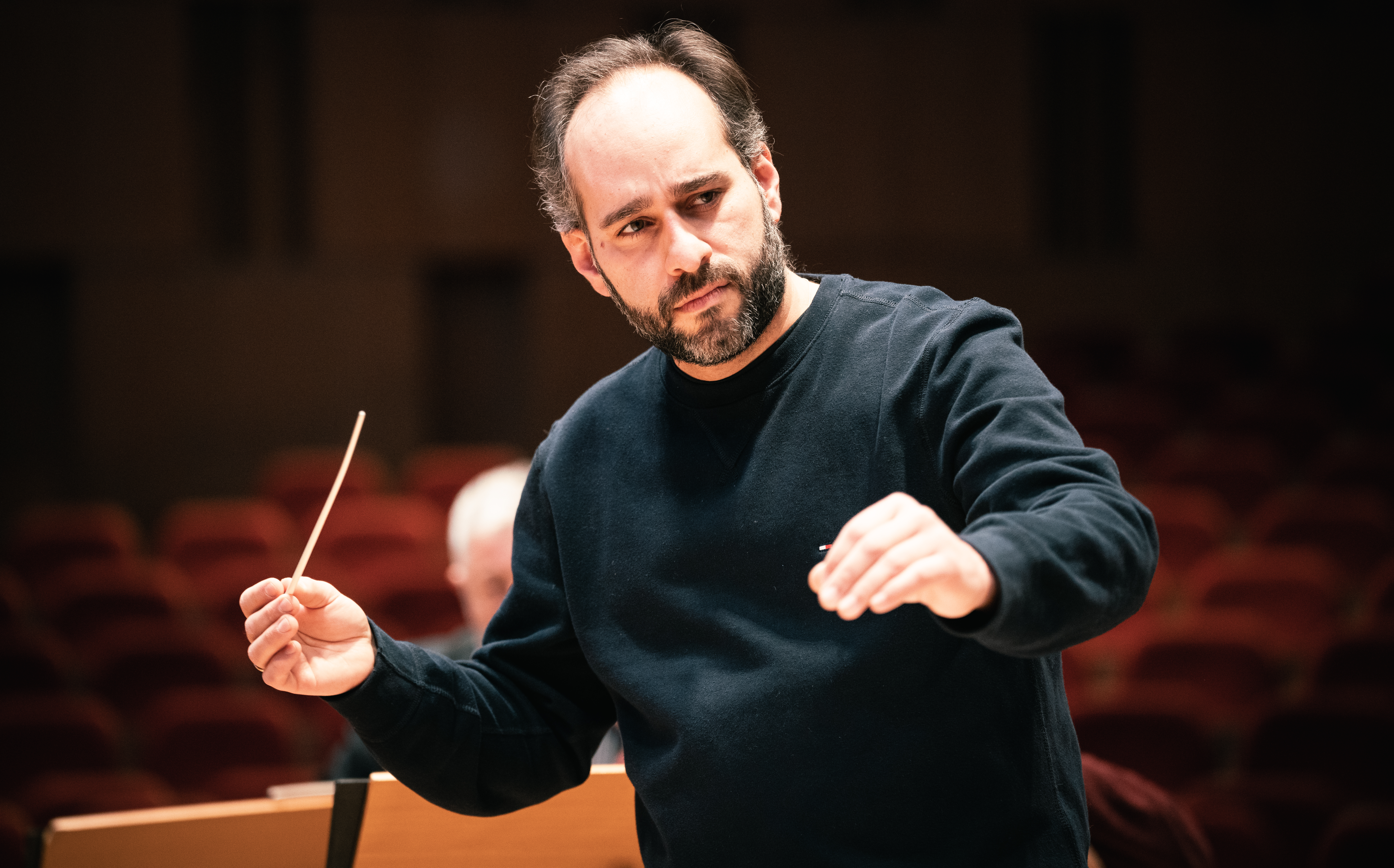
Giovanni Guzzo Conducting, photo by Sören L. Schirmer

Giovanni Guzzo (born 1986 in Porlamar, Margarita Island, Venezuela) is a Venezuelan violinist and conductor.

== Life and career ==
Born in Venezuela to parents of Italian and Venezuelan heritage, Guzzo started the violin at the age of six under the teachings of Emil Friedman and Luis Miguel Gonzales. At the age of 12 he became the youngest violinist to win 1st prize at the XII National Violin Competition “Juan Bautista Plaza” in Venezuela, leading to performances nationwide. He then continued his studies with Zakhar Bron at the Reina Sofía School of Music in Madrid and later moved to London to study at the Royal Academy of Music with Maurice Hasson.

Guzzo has performed in prestigious venues and festivals worldwide, including the Wigmore Hall, Lincoln Centre in New York, the BBC Proms in London, Salzburg and Verbier festivals, performing with conductors such as Sir Simon Rattle, Ivan Fischer, Semyon Bychkov, Marin Alsop, Herbert Blomstedt, Reinhard Goebel and Juanjo Mena.

A protégé of the French violinist Maurice Hasson, Guzzo was granted a scholarship at the age of 16 to study at the Royal Academy of Music in London. After graduating with honours, he was appointed as one of the youngest violin professors in the institution’s long history.

Guzzo has performed on several occasions for the British royal family, most recently performing for Queen Elizabeth II on the 'Viotti ex-Bruce' Stradivarius violin, one of the most precious Stradivarius violins in the world. He has also been awarded with the Queen’s commendation for Excellence and HRH Princess Alice's Prize, presented by Birgitte, Duchess of Gloucester.

Giovanni has been Assistant Conductor to Sir Simon Rattle at the Bavarian Radio Symphony Orchestra in Munich, as well as the Czech Philharmonic.

Guzzo is concertmaster of the Camerata Salzburg. He plays on a 1751 Gennaro Gagliano violin, on extended loan to him and a bow by T. Baker, awarded by J&A Beare.
