= Piero Gamba =

Italian musician (1936–2022)

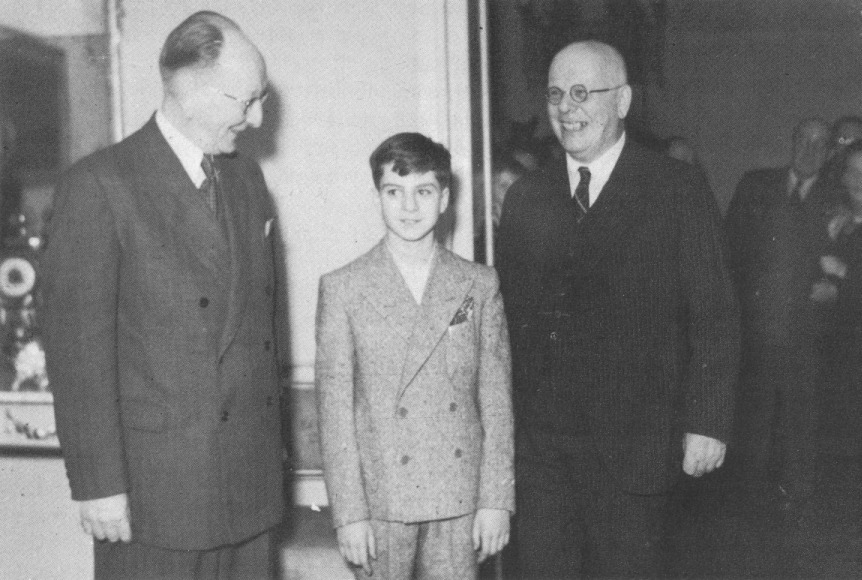
12-year-old Gamba during his visit to Finland in 1949, with Toivo Haapanen to the left and Leo Funtek to the right

Piero Gamba (16 September 1936 – 30 January 2022), also known as Pierino Gamba, was an Italian orchestral conductor and pianist.

== Biography ==
Born in Rome, Italy on 16 September 1936, Gamba came to attention as a child prodigy.

He won the Arnold Bax Memorial Medal in 1962 and during the 1960s he conducted the Philharmonia, and the London Symphony Orchestra, with whom he also recorded for Decca Records. From 1971 to 1980, he was the musical director and conductor of the Winnipeg Symphony Orchestra in Winnipeg, Canada. He was the chief conductor of the Adelaide Symphony Orchestra in Australia from 1983 to 1986, and conducted many other Australian orchestras during this time. He was the musical director and conductor of the SODRE National Symphonic Orchestra of Uruguay from 1994 to 1995 as well as from 2001 to 2004. Gamba was one of the founders of Symphonicum Europae Foundation, an institution whose aim is to promote greater harmony of mankind through the arts.

Gamba lived in New York City, pursued his career and teaching orchestra conducting. He died on 30 January 2022, at the age of 85.

== Collaborations ==
During his career of some seventy years, Gamba worked with many artists, including the following:

- Luciano Pavarotti
- Arthur Rubinstein
- Yehudi Menuhin
- Roberta Peters
- Maureen Forrester
- Van Cliburn
- Mstislav Rostropovitch
- Ronald Turini
- Gary Graffman
- Julius Katchen
- Richard Tucker
- Zara Nelsova
- Ida Haendel
- Ruggiero Ricci
- Alfredo Campoli
- Vladimir Ashkenazy
- Jean-Pierre Rampal
- Henryk Szeryng
- Jorge Bolet
- Itzhak Perlman
- Byron Janis
- Igor Oistrach
- Stefan Askenase
- Simon O'Neill
- Pierre Fournier
- Carlos Montoya
- Robert Merrill
- Maurice André
- Jeremy Menuhin
- Peter Ustinov
- Eugene Istomin
- György Sándor
- Dennis Brain
- Daniel Barenboim
- Harry Belafonte
- Jeanne-Marie Darré
- John Ogdon
- Cecile Licad
- Bruno Leonardo Gelber
- John Williams
- José Iturbi
- Emanuel Ax
- Esteban Sánchez
- Aldo Ciccolini
- Uto Ughi
- Philippe Entremont
- Nina Beilina
- Shura Cherkassky
- Peter Katin
- José Cubiles
- Michael Ponti

== Honours ==
Gamba was an Honorary Conductor for Life of the following orchestras:

- Philharmonia Antwerpen
- Orquesta Sinfonica de Madrid
- Orquesta Filarmonica Barcelona
- Orquesta da Camara Barcelona
- Orquesta A.P.O. Buenos Aires
- Orquesta A.U.D.E.M. Montevideo
- Asociacion Coral Porto.

== Discography ==
Gamba mostly recorded with the following orchestras:

- London Symphony Orchestra (Decca Records, London Records),
- Philharmonia and the New Philharmonia (His Master's Voice, EMI),
- The Royal Danish Orchestra (TONO),
- The Copenhagen Philharmonic Orchestra,
- The Winnipeg Symphony Orchestra (CBC Records), and
- The Symphonicum Europae Orchestra.

These are a few of his available recordings:

- Beethoven: Piano Concertos Nos. 3-5, Piero Gamba conducts the London Symphony Orchestra, and Julius Katchen (Audio CD 1996)
- Beethoven: The Piano Concertos; Choral Fantasy; Diabelli Variations, Piero Gamba conducts the London Symphony Orchestra, and Julius Katchen (Audio CD 2007) Box set
- Liszt: The Piano Concertos, Ataulfo Argenta, Piero Gamba conducts the London Philharmonic Orchestra, and London Symphony Orchestra (Audio CD 2002)
- Rossini: Overtures, Piero Gamba conducts the London Symphony Orchestra (Audio CD 1990)
- Rossini: Overtures, Piero Gamba conducts the London Symphony Orchestra (Audio CD 2004) Original recording remastered
