= Henri Pensis =

Luxembourgish conductor, composer, and violinist

Henri Pensis (3 November 1900 - 1 June 1958) was a Luxembourgish conductor, composer and violinist.

Pensis was born in the Pfaffenthal district of Luxembourg City. In 1933, he founded and became the first conductor of the Luxembourg Philharmonic Orchestra. He moved to the United States in 1940, conducting the New Jersey Philharmonic Orchestra and the Sioux City Symphony Orchestra. He conducted at least three concerts in Carnegie Hall. During Pensis' tenure with the Luxembourg Orchestra the first violin chair was occupied by Ern(e)st Eichel, a Polish violinist who was born in Sambor (Galicia) and had studied in Vienna and Cologne. This violinist who also led occasionally the Luxembourg Orchestra tried after the war to make a career as a conductor. For that purpose Eichel chose the 'nom de plume' of Ernest Borsamsky. Under this pseudonym, created by inverting the syllables of his birth town and adding a Polish "sky" he made some highly collectable recordings for East German Radio in Berlin and Leipzig. He also conducted once the Berlin Philharmonic in 1949. In 1956 his name can be traced last when he conducted the Dresden Orchestra.

Pensis played his last concert at Expo 58 in Brussels; he died 14 days later following a heart attack.

== Works ==
- Soir d'été (poème symphonique)
- Fugue classique
- Suite pour orchestre
- Scène de danse pour orchestre
- Nockes an Nackes (comédie musicale)
- Hymne solennel
- Fantaisie de Noël

=== Popular songs ===
- Fir d'Fräiheet
- Op der Juegd
- D'Fréijoerslidd

Various works are extant only in manuscripts.
