= Winnipeg Symphony Orchestra =

Canadian orchestra

Winnipeg Symphony Orchestra (WSO)
- Orchestra
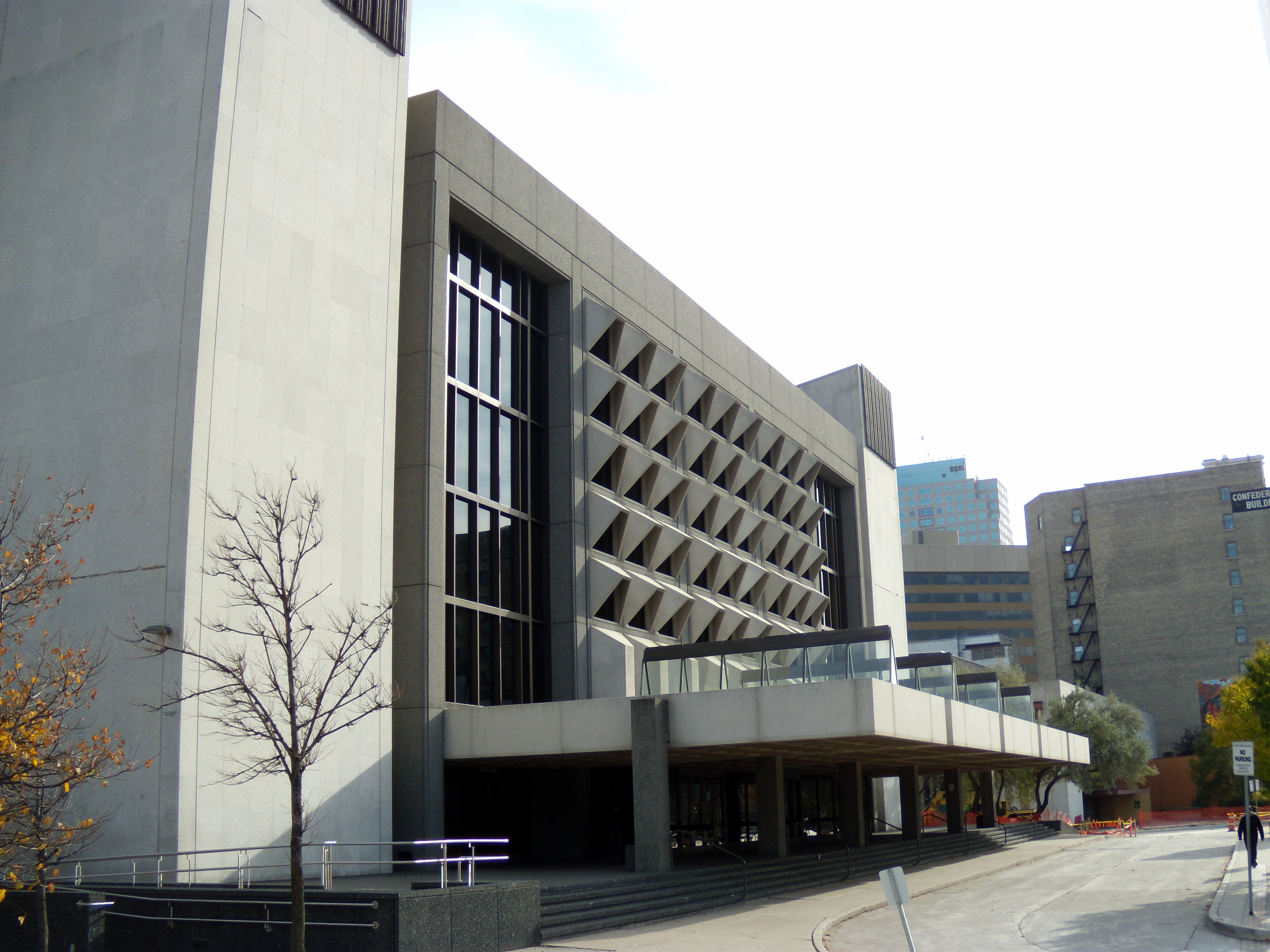
- Centennial Concert Hall
- Short name: WSO
- Founded: 1947
- Location: Winnipeg, Manitoba
- Concert hall: Centennial Concert Hall
- Music director: Daniel Raiskin
- Website: wso.ca

The Winnipeg Symphony Orchestra (WSO) is a Canadian orchestra based in Winnipeg, Manitoba. Founded in 1947, the orchestra plays most of its concerts at the Centennial Concert Hall. Including travelling performances, the WSO presents an average of 80 concerts per year, and also provides orchestral accompaniment to the Royal Winnipeg Ballet and the Manitoba Opera.

== History ==
The WSO was established in 1947 and played its first concert on December 16, 1948 at the Civic Auditorium. Walter Kaufmann was the WSO's first music director from 1948 to 1958. Victor Feldbrill, the WSO's only Canadian music director to date, succeeded Kaufmann in 1958. The WSO initially performed out of the Civic Auditorium until April 1968, when the WSO moved to its present home in the 2,300-seat Centennial Concert Hall.

During the 1970s, the orchestra was conducted by former child prodigy and Decca Records-recording artist Piero Gamba, who invited Mstislav Rostropovich, Vladimir Ashkenazy, Itzhak Perlman, and others to perform with the orchestra. Gamba's tenure was followed by Kazuhiro Koizumi, who conducted the orchestra through much of the 1980, including a number of recording sessions with CBC records. In 1992, then-music director Bramwell Tovey and the WSO's composer-in-residence Glenn Buhr, along with others, created the WSO's New Music Festival. In the 2011–2012 season, the WSO began the 'Sistema Winnipeg' programme, modelled after Venezuela's El Sistema, to provide music education to disadvantaged children in Winnipeg.

Andrey Boreyko was the WSO's music director from 2001 to 2006. During his tenure, the musicians experienced a labour lockout in December 2001, and the mass resignation of the orchestra's board in the winter of 2003. The musicians took a 20% pay cut and Boreyko donated a portion of his salary to the orchestra during the financially troubled 2002–2003 season. The orchestra musicians took an additional pay cut for the 2003–2004 season. The orchestra retired its accumulated debt in September 2005. In his final season as music director, Boreyko led six weeks of concerts, in contrast to 12 the season before. Overall, Boreyko received praise for his musicianship, but also criticism for a lack of community outreach, and not fulfilling an intention to establish residency in Winnipeg.

In February 2006, Alexander Mickelthwate was named the WSO's eighth music director. He took up the post in September 2006, with an initial contract of 3 years. In December 2008, Mickelthwate extended his contract with the orchestra through the 2012 season. His Winnipeg contract was further extended through the 2015–2016 season. In May 2017, the orchestra announced that Mickelthwate would conclude his music directorship of the orchestra after the close of the 2017–2018 season.

In 2015, Daniel Raiskin first guest-conducted the WSO. In February 2018, the WSO announced the appointment of Raiskin as its next music director, effective with the 2018–2019 season.

In January 2026, the WSO announced Kelly-Marie Murphy as their new composer-in-residence, to begin in the 2026-27 season, succeeding Haralabos [Harry] Stafylakis after a decade in that role.

== Discography ==
- The Winnipeg Symphony Orchestra (1977)
- Kunzel on Broadway (1985)
- Songs of paradise / Chants du paradis (1988)
- Mozartiana (1993)
- Collage (1994)
- Music for Violin and Orchestra (1998)
- Lark Ascending (1998)
- Songs of Paradise (1998)
- Winter Poems (1999)
- Symphony No. 9 (2006)
- I believe: a Holocaust Oratorio for Today (2009)

== Music directors ==
- Walter Kaufmann (1948–1958)
- Victor Feldbrill (1958–1968)
- George Cleve (1968–1970)
- Piero Gamba (1971–1980)
- Kazuhiro Koizumi (1983–1988)
- Bramwell Tovey (1989–2001)
- Andrey Boreyko (2001–2006)
- Alexander Mickelthwate (2006–2018)
- Daniel Raiskin (2018–present)

== Composers-in-residence ==
- Glenn Buhr (1990-1996)
- Randolph Peters (1996-2001)
- Vincent Ho 2007-2014
- T. Patrick Carrabré 2001-2007
- Haralabos [Harry] Stafylakis (2016-2026)
- Kelly-Marie Murphy (2026-)
