= Victor Feldbrill =

Canadian musician (1924–2020)

- Born: April 4, 1924; Toronto, Ontario
- Died: June 17, 2020 (aged 96) Toronto, Ontario
- Occupations: Conductor, musician
- Instrument: Violin

Victor Feldbrill, OC OOnt (April 4, 1924 – June 17, 2020) was a Canadian conductor and violinist.

== Early life and education ==
Feldbrill was born in Toronto, the son of Polish Jewish immigrants, Helen (Lederman) and Nathan Feldbrill. In his teen years he played the violin and attended Harbord Collegiate Institute. He joined the Navy in World War II, playing the violin in the Navy Show and studying part time at the Royal Academy of Music. He is a graduate of the University of Toronto.

== Career ==
Feldbrill performed as a violinist in the Toronto Symphony Orchestra from 1949 to 1956. From 1958 to 1968, he was the principal conductor of the Winnipeg Symphony Orchestra. In 1967 he conducted the Toronto Philharmonia in a recording of the album Heritage, which featured music by Canadian composers.

In 1969 he directed the CBC Festival Orchestra. That year he conducted the CBC Studio Orchestra in an adaptation of the music for the opera Louis Riel, which was released years later as a DVD.

From 1973 to 1978, he was the resident conductor of the Toronto Symphony Orchestra. In 1974, he founded the Toronto Symphony Youth Orchestra and was its conductor until 1978. His students include Milton Barnes and Brian Jackson.

In 1985, he was made an Officer of the Order of Canada. In the 1990s he directed the Hamilton Philharmonic. In 1999, he was awarded the Order of Ontario.

In 2017 Feldbrill returned to conduct the Winnipeg Symphony for its 70th anniversary. He was 94.

Victor Feldbrill died on June 17, 2020, in Toronto, at the age of 96.

== Bibliography ==
- Pitman, Walter (2010). Victor Feldbrill: Canadian conductor extraordinaire. Dundurn Press. ISBN 9781554887682.
