= Víctor Martín (violinist) =

Violinist (b. 1940, d. 2017)

Víctor Martín (Elne, 24 September 1940 – Madrid, 21 September 2017) was a Spanish violinist. He studied in the Madrid Royal Conservatory, in the Geneva Conservatory and in the Cologne Superior Music School. In 1968 he moved to Canada to join the University of Toronto Faculty of Music, where he held a violin chair for a decade. In 1978 he returned to Spain to become the Spanish National Orchestra's new leader, a position he held until 2001. He also served as the leader-conductor of the Spanish Chamber Orchestra and a professor in Madrid Royal Conservatory, which associating with pianist Miguel Zanetti in chamber music.

He died on September 21, 2017. The Spanish National Orchestra's following concert on September 26, which coincidentally included Gabriel Fauré's Requiem, was dedicated to him as a memorial, with Frank Peter Zimmermann joining in his encore.

== Premieres ==
Date	Venue	Composer	Composition	Orchestra	Conductor
1986–12–19	Madrid	Conrado del Campo	Violin Concerto ^{(posthumous)}	Spanish National	Maximiano Valdés
