= Carapelle Calvisio =

- Comune
- Comune di Carapelle Calvisio
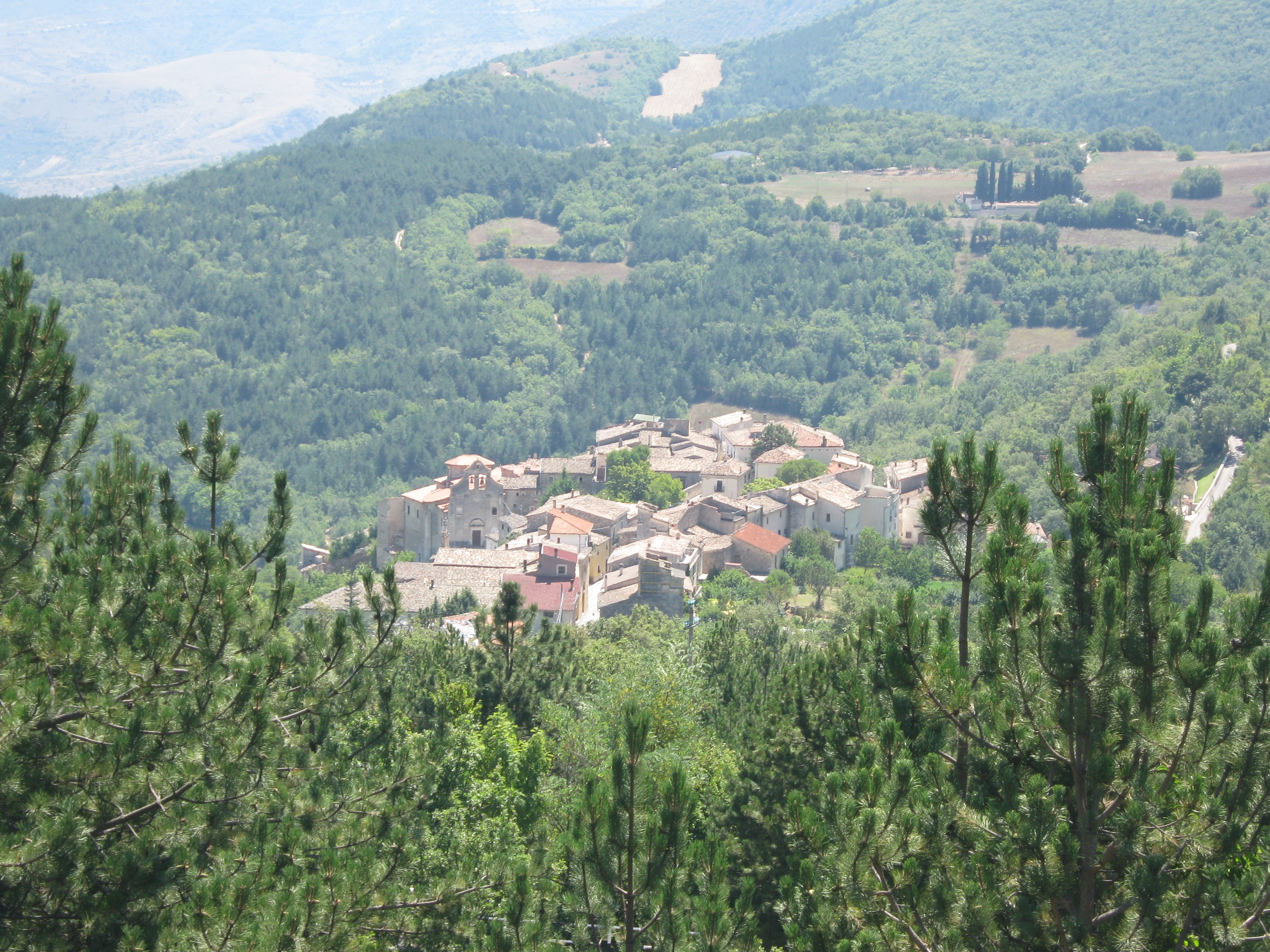

- Coat of arms

- Location within Italy Location within Abruzzo
- Coordinates: 42°18′1″N 13°41′8″E
- Country: Italy
- Region: Abruzzo
- Province: L'Aquila (AQ)

Government
  - Mayor: Domenico Di Cesare

Area
  - Total: 14.79 km^{2} (5.71 sq mi)
- Elevation: 910 m (2,990 ft)

Population (2026)
  - Total: 68
  - Density: 4.6/km^{2} (12/sq mi)
- Demonym: Carapellesi
- Time zone: UTC+1 (CET)
  - Summer (DST): UTC+2 (CEST)
- Postal code: 67020
- Dialing code: 0862
- Patron saint: San Pancrazio martire
- Saint day: 12 May

Carapelle Calvisio is a village and comune (municipality) in the Province of L'Aquila in the region of Abruzzo in central Italy. It is located in the natural park known as the Gran Sasso e Monti della Laga National Park at 900 metres (3,000 ft) above sea level. It is mostly known as being one of the least populous non-alpine comunes in Italy, with a population of 68 as of 2026. It also the least populous municipality in Abruzzo, tied with Montelapiano. It is located directly some kilometers from the historical castle Rocca Calascio.

Carapelle Calvisio's location (separated by a mountain from L'Aquila area) preserved it from serious damage in the 2009 L'Aquila earthquake.

== Demographics ==
As of 2026, the population is 68, of which 52.9% are male, and 47.1% are female. Minors make up 8.8% of the population, and seniors make up 38.2%.

Historical population

| Year | Pop. | ±% |
|---|---|---|
| 1861 | 796 | — |
| 1871 | 834 | +4.8% |
| 1881 | 856 | +2.6% |
| 1901 | 969 | +13.2% |
| 1911 | 1,001 | +3.3% |
| 1921 | 1,002 | +0.1% |
| 1931 | 692 | −30.9% |
| 1936 | 645 | −6.8% |

| Year | Pop. | ±% |
|---|---|---|
| 1951 | 578 | −10.4% |
| 1961 | 337 | −41.7% |
| 1971 | 179 | −46.9% |
| 1981 | 144 | −19.6% |
| 1991 | 125 | −13.2% |
| 2001 | 95 | −24.0% |
| 2011 | 85 | −10.5% |
| 2021 | 78 | −8.2% |

Source: ISTAT

=== Immigration ===
As of 2025, the foreign-born population is 10, making up 14.3% of the total population. The largest foreign country of origin is Brazil with 3 residents, the others are at 1.
