= Martin Rajna =

Hungarian conductor

- Born: September 21, 1995 (age 30); Dunaújváros, Hungary
- Education: Liszt Ferenc Academy of Music; University of Music Franz Liszt Weimar
- Occupation: Conductor
- Years active: 2017–present
- Website: https://martinrajna.com/

Martin Rajna (born 21 September 1995) is a Hungarian conductor. He is First Conductor of the Hungarian State Opera and was Chief Conductor of the Győr Philharmonic Orchestra from 2021 to 2025. In January 2025, he was appointed Music Director Designate of the Luxembourg Philharmonic Orchestra, effective from the 2026–27 season.

== Early life and education ==
Martin Rajna was born in Dunaújváros, Hungary. He began his musical training at the Móricz Zsigmond Primary School of Music, and later studied piano at the Béla Bartók Conservatory in Budapest.

Rajna attended studied conducting at the Franz Liszt Academy of Music in Budapest, then continued his education at the University of Music Franz Liszt Weimar.

In 2021 he joined the mentoring programme at the Péter Eötvös Contemporary Music Foundation.

== Career ==
Rajna served as Assistant Conductor of the Győr Philharmonic Orchestra from 2017 to 2019, and as Chief Conductor from 2021 to 2025. In 2023, he was appointed Principal Conductor of the Hungarian State Opera. Rajna has recently conducted Der fliegende Holländer by Wagner, Verdi's Macbeth, Strauss's Die Fledermaus, and Donizetti's Maria Stuarda. In addition, he maintains concert engagements with the Hungarian National Philharmonic and the Győr Philharmonic.

In 2025, at the age of 29, Rajna was named Music Director of the Luxembourg Philharmonic Orchestra; his four-year tenure is scheduled to start in September 2026.

He has conducted nearly all major Hungarian orchestras, including the Hungarian National Philharmonic, the Hungarian Radio Symphony Orchestra, the Budafok Dohnányi Orchestra, the Danubia Orchestra Óbuda, the Miskolc Symphony Orchestra, the Zugló Philharmonic, and the Duna Symphony Orchestra.

Internationally, he has worked with the London Philharmonic Orchestra, the orchestra of Teatro La Fenice, the Slovenian Radio Symphony Orchestra, and the Nuremberg Symphony Orchestra. He has also appeared at the Tiroler Festspiele in Erl and the Weilburger Schlosskonzerte.

In 2024, he was included in the Forbes Hungary "30 under 30" list of successful young Hungarians.

== Awards and recognition ==
- Junior Prima Award (2018)
- Forum Dirigieren scholarship recipient, German Music Council (2022)
- Lucerne Festival Academy Conducting Fellow (2022)
- Cziffra Festival Talent Award (2023)

== Selected repertoire ==
=== Operas ===
- L'italiana in Algeri (Rossini)
- Macbeth (Verdi)
- Lohengrin (Wagner)
- Turandot (Puccini)
- Maria Stuarda (Donizetti)
- Bluebeard’s Castle (Bartók)
- La voix humaine (Poulenc)
- Die Fledermaus (J. Strauss II)

=== Concert works ===
- Symphony No. 4 in B-flat major, Op. 60 (Beethoven)
- Symphony No. 8 in G major, Op. 88 (Dvořák)
- Selections by Ludwig van Beethoven and Richard Strauss
- Works by Zoltán Kodály and Béla Bartók
- Messa di Gloria (Mascagni)
- Orchestral works by Carl Maria von Weber, Johannes Brahms, and Robert Schumann
