= Toronto Symphony Orchestra =

Canadian orchestra

- Orchestra
- Former name: New Symphony Orchestra
- Founded: 1906 (disbanded between 1918 and 1922)
- Location: Toronto, Ontario, Canada
- Concert hall: Roy Thomson Hall
- Music director: Gustavo Gimeno
- Website: www.tso.ca

The Toronto Symphony Orchestra (TSO) is a Canadian orchestra based in Toronto, Ontario. Founded in 1906, the TSO gave regular concerts at Massey Hall until 1982, and since then has performed at Roy Thomson Hall. The TSO also manages the Toronto Symphony Youth Orchestra (TSYO). Peter Oundjian was the music director from 2004 to 2018. Sir Andrew Davis, conductor laureate of the TSO, was the orchestra's interim artistic director from 2018 to 2020. Gustavo Gimeno has been the music director of the TSO since the 2020–2021 season.

== History ==
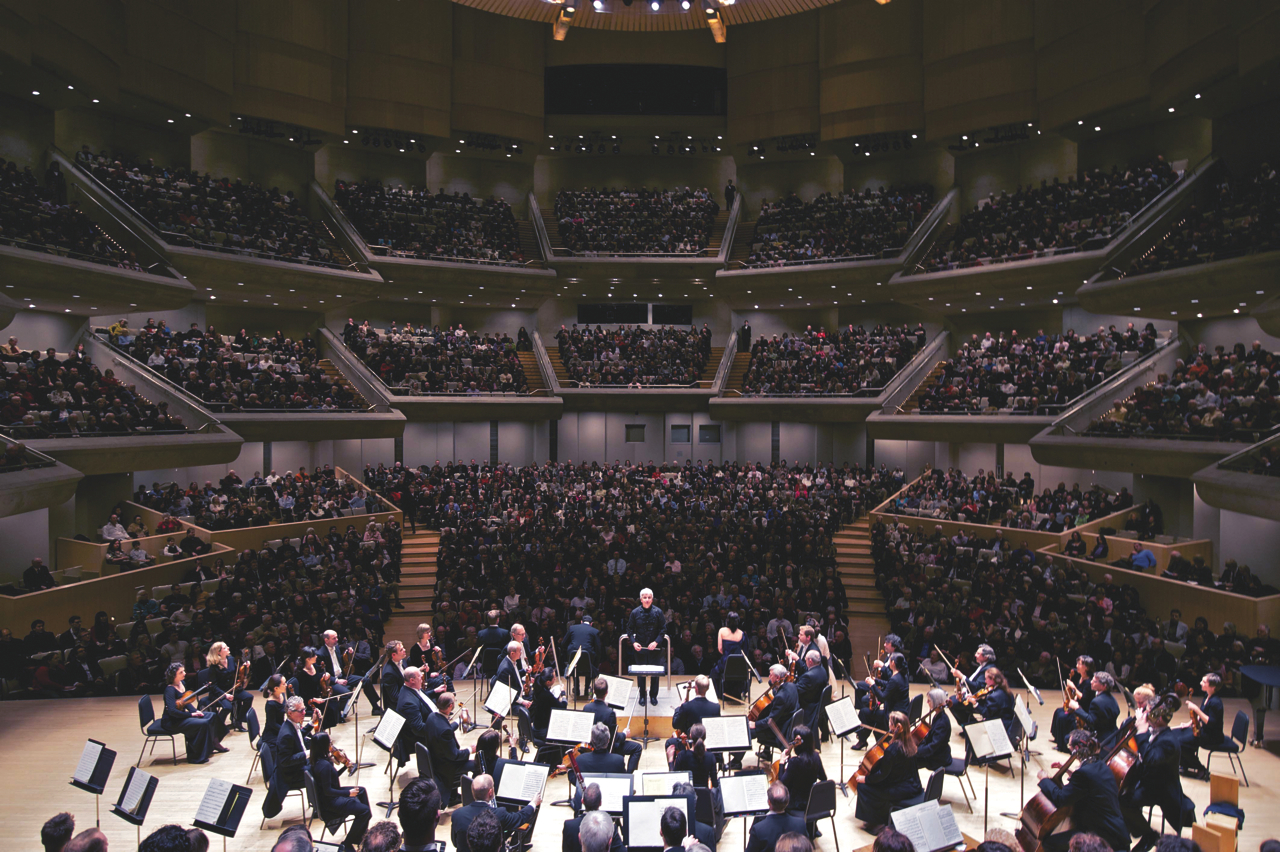
Then-music director Peter Oundjian posing with the TSO at Roy Thomson Hall before a concert in January 2012

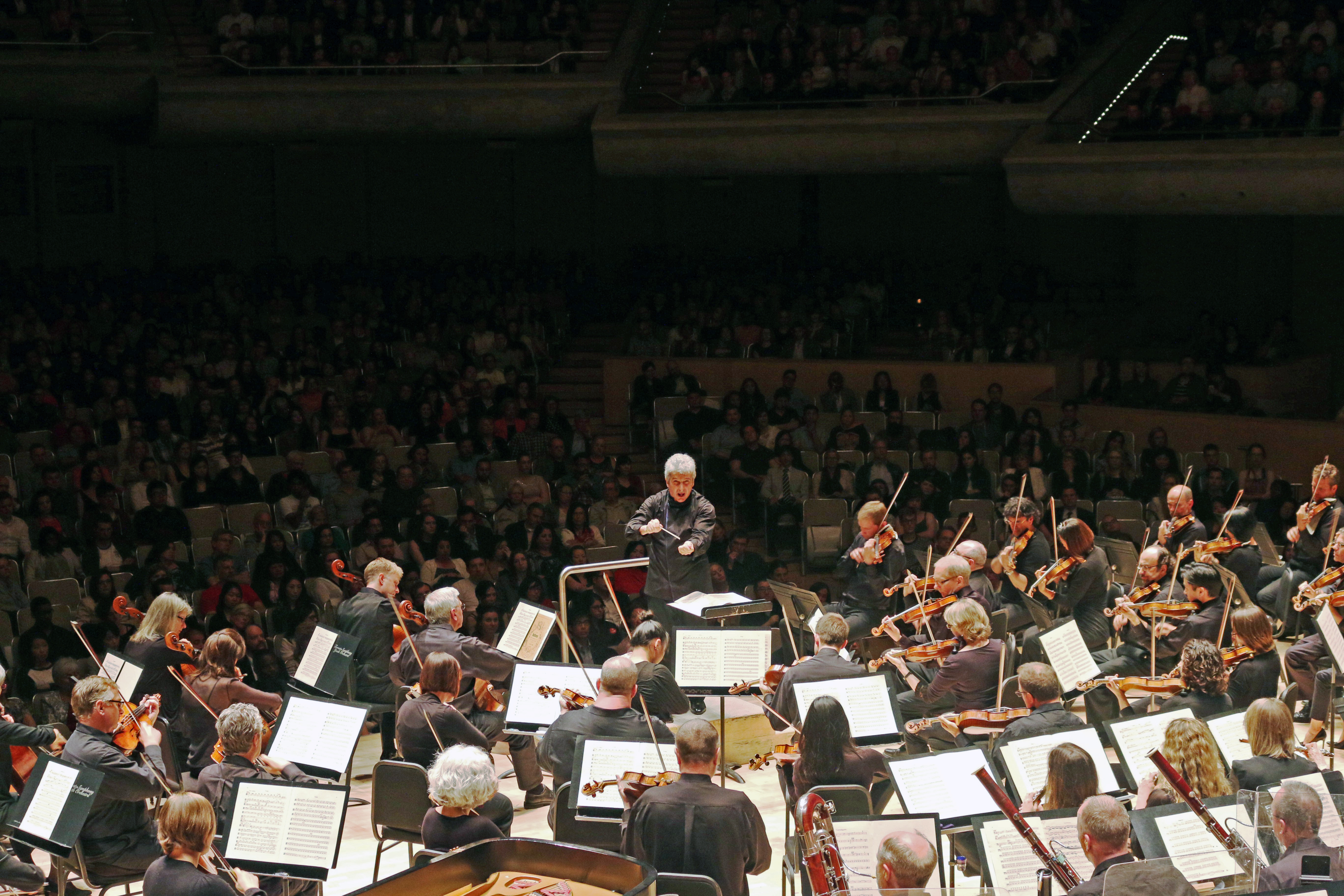
Peter Oundjian conducting the TSO at Roy Thomson Hall in June 2014

The TSO was founded in 1922 as the New Symphony Orchestra, and gave its first concert at Massey Hall in April 1923 with 58 musicians. The first conductor was Luigi von Kunits, and that season there were twenty concerts, as well as a performance at a spring festival.

In the summer of 1924, the symphony performed at the Canadian National Exhibition. Shortly thereafter, they began holding children's concerts. The orchestra changed its name to the Toronto Symphony Orchestra in 1927. In 1929, the TSO made its radio debut with a one-hour broadcast on CBC Radio from the Arcadian Court.

After von Kunits' death in 1931, Ernest MacMillan served as music director for 25 years. In 1951, the orchestra made headlines when it declined to renew the contracts of musicians, thereafter known as the Symphony Six, who had been denied entry to the United States on suspicion of communist activities, during the McCarthy Era.

Andrew Davis was the TSO's music director from 1975 to 1988. The TSO subsequently granted Davis the title of conductor laureate.

The orchestra had financial and audience size problems during the 1990s, and in 1992, TSO musicians accepted a 16% pay cut because of a threat of bankruptcy to the orchestra, with a promise from management to make up the loss in subsequent contract negotiations. By 1999, this pay restoration had not happened, which led to an 11-week musicians' strike that autumn. Relations between the musicians and management deteriorated, and the music director at the time, Jukka-Pekka Saraste, offered to serve as mediator in the situation. In addition, there was a lack of public sympathy to the orchestra musicians' situation. By 2001, the TSO had debt of $7 million CAD, and both executive director Ed Smith and music director Saraste had left the ensemble.

Peter Oundjian was appointed as music director in January 2003 and became music director in the 2004–2005 season. The 2005 documentary film Five Days in September: The Rebirth of an Orchestra recorded the first days of the TSO's inaugural season with Oundjian as its new music director. His contract was extended through to the 2017–2018 season. He concluded his TSO tenure at the close of the 2017–2018 season and was given the title of conductor emeritus. With Oundjian, the TSO made commercial recordings for its own TSO Live label and for other labels such as Chandos Records.

By the 2006–2007 season, the subscriber base had increased to about 25,000, and the audience average capacity also increased to 84%. In November 2008, the orchestra reported its third consecutive year of budget surpluses, with average audience attendance of 88% (excluding concerts for schoolchildren), although the orchestra still retained overall debt of $8.9 million CAD in 2008. In 2022, the TSO ended the season with its first net surplus since 1979.

In April 2015, controversy ensued after the TSO cancelled the appearance of Valentina Lisitsa, citing Twitter postings by her in relation to the war in Donbas which were seen as conducive to "public incitement of hatred" under the Criminal Code of Canada.

In January 2017, the TSO announced its participation in the celebrations of the 150th anniversary of Canada, with a cross-country celebration of Canadian music funded by the Canadian government.

In May 2017, the TSO announced the return of Davis to the orchestra as its interim artistic director, beginning with the 2018–2019 season, for a period of two seasons. In April 2018, the TSO announced the appointment of Matthew Loden as its chief executive officer (CEO), effective July 2018.

In February 2018, Gustavo Gimeno guest-conducted the TSO for the first time. On the basis of this appearance, the TSO announced the appointment of Gimeno as its next music director, effective in the 2020–2021 season, with an initial contract of 5 years. In July 2020, the TSO announced the cancellation of its originally scheduled 2020–2021 concert season, with plans for replacement concerts on a smaller scale in various Toronto venues, in the wake of the COVID-19 pandemic.

In July 2021, the TSO announced that Matthew Loden was to stand down as its CEO, effective 22 September 2021. In January 2022, the TSO announced the appointment of Mark Williams as its next chief executive officer, effective April 2022. In November 2022, the TSO announced the extension of Gimeno's contract as its music director through 2030.

== Music directors ==
- Luigi von Kunits (1922–1931)
- Sir Ernest MacMillan (1931–1956)
- Walter Susskind (1956–1965)
- Seiji Ozawa (1965–1969)
- Karel Ančerl (1969–1973)
- Sir Andrew Davis (1975–1988)
- Günther Herbig (1988–1994)
- Jukka-Pekka Saraste (1994–2001)
- Peter Oundjian (2004–2018)
- Sir Andrew Davis (interim artistic director and conductor laureate, 2018–2020)
- Gustavo Gimeno (2020–present)

== See also ==
- List of symphony orchestras
- Canadian classical music
- Toronto Symphony Youth Orchestra
