= List of principal conductors by orchestra =

This is a non-exhaustive list of principal conductors by orchestra, principally for orchestras with pages on Wikipedia, classified by country and by city. The term 'principal conductor' is used here as an umbrella term to encompass such titles as:

- Principal conductor
- Music director
- Chief conductor

The term 'music director' is more common in the US and Canada, whereas 'principal conductor' or 'chief conductor' is more prevalent elsewhere. In German-speaking countries, the title of general music director (Generalmusikdirektor / Generalmusikdirektorin) is used for conductors who are the music director of multiple musical institutions in a given city, such as both a symphony orchestra and an opera house. For orchestras which simultaneously have or have had both a music director and a principal conductor, such as the Royal Northern Sinfonia and Orchestra Sinfonica di Milano Giuseppe Verdi, the person with the title of music director is given preference by hierarchy.

Orchestras which choose not to have principal conductors, such as the Orchestra of the Age of Enlightenment, Saint Paul Chamber Orchestra and the Vienna Philharmonic Orchestra, are omitted from this list. Likewise, principal conductors for opera companies are omitted, unless the orchestra of that opera company performs orchestral concerts under a separate name.

== Argentina ==
City	Orchestra	Conductor	Nationality
Buenos Aires	Argentine National Symphony Orchestra	(post vacant)	

== Armenia ==
City	Orchestra	Conductor	Nationality
Yerevan	Armenian State Symphony Orchestra	Sergey Smbatyan	Armenian
Yerevan	Armenian Philharmonic Orchestra	Eduard Topchjan	Armenian
Yerevan	National Chamber Orchestra of Armenia	Vahan Mardirossian	Armenian
Gyumri	KOHAR Symphony Orchestra and Choir	Natalie Galstyan	Armenian

== Australia ==
City	Orchestra	Conductor	Nationality
Adelaide	Adelaide Symphony Orchestra	Mark Wigglesworth	British
Brisbane	Queensland Symphony Orchestra	Umberto Clerici	Italian
Canberra	Canberra Symphony Orchestra	Jessica Cottis	Australian
Darwin	Darwin Symphony Orchestra	Richard Mills	Australian
Hobart	Tasmanian Symphony Orchestra	Eivind Aadland	Norwegian
Melbourne	Melbourne Symphony Orchestra	Jaime Martín	Spanish
Perth	West Australian Symphony Orchestra	Asher Fisch	Israeli
Sydney	Australian Chamber Orchestra	Richard Tognetti	Australian
Sydney	Australian World Orchestra	Alexander Briger	Australian
Sydney	Sydney Symphony Orchestra	Simone Young	Australian

== Austria ==
City	Orchestra	Conductor	Nationality
Bregenz	Vorarlberg Symphony	Gérard Korsten	South African
Drassburg	Österreichisch-Ungarische Haydn Philharmonie	Nicolas Altstaedt	German
Graz	Grazer Philharmonisches Orchester	Roland Kluttig	German
Linz	Ars Antiqua Austria	Gunar Letzbor	Austrian
Linz	Bruckner Orchestra Linz	Markus Poschner	German
Salzburg	Mozarteum Orchestra Salzburg	Riccardo Minasi	Italian
Vienna	Concentus Musicus Wien	Stefan Gottfried	Austrian
Vienna	Klangforum Wien	Beat Furrer	Swiss
Vienna	Nova Orchester Wien	William Garfield Walker	American
Vienna	Tonkünstler Orchestra	Yutaka Sado	Japanese
Vienna	Vienna Chamber Orchestra	Stefan Vladar	Austrian
Vienna	Vienna Radio Symphony Orchestra	Markus Poschner	German
Vienna	Vienna Hofburg Orchestra	Gert Hofbauer	Austrian
Vienna	Wiener Johann Strauss Orchester	Johannes Wildner	Austrian
Vienna	Vienna Symphony	Petr Popelka	Czech

== Belgium ==
City	Orchestra	Conductor	Nationality
Antwerp	Antwerp Symphony Orchestra	Marc Albrecht	German
Brussels	Belgian National Orchestra	(post vacant)	
Brussels	Brussels Philharmonic	Kazushi Ōno	Japanese
Ghent	Oost-Vlaams Symfonisch Orkest	Geert Baetens	Belgian
Liège	Orchestre Philharmonique de Liège	Lionel Bringuier	French
Mons	Orchestre Royal de Chambre de Wallonie	Frank Braley	French

== Bolivia ==
City	Orchestra	Conductor	Nationality
La Paz	National Symphony Orchestra of Bolivia	Weimar Arancibia Garcia	Bolivian

== Brazil ==
City	Orchestra	Conductor	Nationality
Rio de Janeiro	Orquestra Sinfônica Brasileira	Roberto Minczuk	Brazilian
São Paulo	Orquestra Sinfônica do Estado de São Paulo	Thierry Fischer	Swiss
Ponta Grossa	Orquestra Sinfônica de Ponta Grossa	Jayme Amatnecks	Brazilian
Brasilia	Orquestra Sinfônica de Brasília - OSTNCS	Cláudio Cohen	Brazilian

== Bulgaria ==
City	Orchestra	Conductor	Nationality
Plovdiv	State Opera Plovdiv Orchestra	Dian Chobanov	Bulgarian
Ruse	State Opera Rousse Orchestra	Dimitar Kosev	Bulgarian
Sofia	Bulgarian National Radio Symphony Orchestra	Konstantin Ilievsky	Macedonian
Sofia	Classic FM Radio Orchestra	Grigor Palikarov	Bulgarian
Sofia	Sofia Philharmonic Orchestra	Nayden Todorov	Bulgarian

== Canada ==
City	Orchestra	Conductor	Nationality
Calgary	Calgary Civic Symphony	Rolf Bertsch	Canadian
Calgary	Calgary Philharmonic Orchestra	(post vacant)	
Calgary	Rocky Mountain Symphony Orchestra	Carlos Foggin	Canadian
Charlottetown	PEI Symphony Orchestra	Jaelem Bhate	Canadian
Edmonton	Edmonton Symphony Orchestra	Jean-Marie Zeitouni	Canadian
Edmonton	Alberta Symphony Orchestra	Emilio De Mercato	Italian
Halifax, Nova Scotia	Symphony Nova Scotia	(post vacant)	
Hamilton, Ontario	Hamilton Philharmonic Orchestra	James S. Kahane	French
Kitchener, Ontario	Kitchener-Waterloo Symphony	(post vacant)	
Laval, Quebec	Orchestre symphonique de Laval	Adam Johnson	Canadian
Montreal	Montreal Symphony Orchestra	Rafael Payare	Venezuelan
Montreal	Orchestre classique de Montréal	Andrei Feher	Canadian-Romanian
Montreal	Orchestre Métropolitain	Yannick Nézet-Séguin	Canadian
Kelowna, British Columbia	Okanagan Symphony Orchestra	Julian Pellicano	Canadian-American
Ottawa	National Arts Centre Orchestra	John Storgårds	Finnish
Quebec City	Les Violons du Roy	Bernard Labadie	Canadian
Quebec City	Orchestre symphonique de Québec	Clemens Schuldt	German
Regina, Saskatchewan	Regina Symphony Orchestra	(post vacant)	
Saskatoon, Saskatchewan	Saskatoon Symphony Orchestra	(post vacant)	
Saint John, New Brunswick	Symphony NB	Mélanie Léonard	Canadian
St. John's, Newfoundland and Labrador	Newfoundland Symphony Orchestra	Simon Rivard	Canadian
Thunder Bay	Thunder Bay Symphony Orchestra	(post vacant)	
Toronto	Kindred Spirits Orchestra	Kristian Alexander	Canadian
Toronto	Tafelmusik Baroque Orchestra	(post vacant)	
Toronto	Toronto Symphony Orchestra	Gustavo Gimeno	Spanish
Trois-Rivières	Orchestre symphonique de Trois-Rivières	Alain Trudel	Canadian
Vancouver	Vancouver Symphony Orchestra	Otto Tausk	Dutch
Victoria	Victoria Symphony Orchestra	Christian Kluxen	Danish
Windsor	Windsor Symphony Orchestra	(post vacant)	
Winnipeg	Manitoba Chamber Orchestra	Anne Manson	American
Winnipeg	Winnipeg Symphony Orchestra	Daniel Raiskin	Russian

== Chile ==
City	Orchestra	Conductor	Nationality
Santiago	National Symphony Orchestra of Chile	Rodolfo Saglimbeni	Venezuelan

== China ==
City	Orchestra	Conductor	Nationality
Beijing	China Philharmonic Orchestra	Yu Long	Chinese
Guangzhou	Guangzhou Symphony Orchestra	Huang Yi	Chinese
Nanning	Guangxi Symphony Orchestra	Synthia Ko	Chinese
Shanghai	Shanghai Symphony Orchestra	Yu Long	Chinese

== Colombia ==
City	Orchestra	Conductor	Nationality
Bogotá	Bogotá Philharmonic Orchestra	(post vacant)	
Bogotá	National Symphony Orchestra of Colombia	Olivier Grangean	French
Cali	Cali Philharmonic Orchestra	Irwin Hoffman	American
Medellín	Orquesta Filarmónica de Medellín	David Greilsammer	Israel

== Czech Republic ==
City	Orchestra	Conductor	Nationality
Brno	Brno Philharmonic	Dennis Russell Davies	American
České Budějovice	South Czech Philharmonic	Miran Vaupotić	Croatian
Olomouc	Moravian Philharmonic	Petr Vronský	Czech
Ostrava	Janáček Philharmonic Orchestra	Daniel Raiskin	Russian
Prague	Czech National Symphony Orchestra	Steven Mercurio	American
Prague	Czech Philharmonic	Semyon Bychkov	Russian
Prague	Prague Philharmonia	Emmanuel Villaume	French
Prague	Prague Radio Symphony Orchestra	Petr Popelka	Czech
Prague	Prague Symphony Orchestra	Tomáš Brauner	Czech

== Denmark ==
City	Orchestra	Conductor	Nationality
Aalborg	Aalborg Symphony Orchestra	Joshua Weilerstein	American
Aarhus	Aarhus Symphony Orchestra	Marc Soustrot	French
Copenhagen	Danish National Chamber Orchestra	Ádám Fischer	Hungarian
Copenhagen	Danish National Symphony Orchestra	Fabio Luisi	Italian
Copenhagen	Royal Danish Orchestra	Marie Jacquot	French
Odense	Odense Symphony Orchestra	Pierre Bleuse	French

== Estonia ==
City	Orchestra	Conductor	Nationality
Narva	Narva City Orchestra	Anatoli Štšura	Estonian
Pärnu	Pärnu City Orchestra	Henri Christofer Aavik	Estonian
Tallinn	Estonian National Symphony Orchestra	Olari Elts	Estonian
Tallinn	Tallinn Chamber Orchestra	(post vacant)	
Tartu	Vanemuine Symphony Orchestra	Risto Joost	Estonian

== Finland ==
City	Orchestra	Conductor	Nationality
Jyväskylä	Jyväskylä Sinfonia	Ville Matvejeff	Finnish
Helsinki	Finnish Radio Symphony Orchestra	Nicholas Collon	British
Helsinki	Helsinki Chamber Orchestra	James S. Kahane	French
Helsinki	Helsinki Philharmonic Orchestra	Jukka-Pekka Saraste	Finnish
Helsinki	Helsinki University Symphony Orchestra	Mikk Murdvee	Estonian
Helsinki	The Polytech Orchestra	Vuokko Lahtinen	Finnish
Joensuu	Joensuu City Orchestra	Eero Lehtimäki	Finnish
Lahti	Lahti Symphony Orchestra	Nil Venditti (designate, effective 2027)	
Lappeenranta	Lappeenranta City Orchestra	Erkki Lasonpalo	Finnish
Mikkeli	St. Michel Strings	Erkki Lasonpalo	Finnish
Oulu	Oulu Symphony Orchestra	Rumon Gamba	British
Pori	Pori Sinfonietta	Tibor Bogányi	Finnish
Tampere	Tampere Philharmonic Orchestra	Matthew Halls	British
Turku	Turku Philharmonic Orchestra	John Storgårds	Finnish
Vaasa	Vaasa City Orchestra	Anna-Maria Helsing	Finnish

== France ==
City	Orchestra	Conductor	Nationality
Alfortville	Orchestre national d'Île-de-France	Case Scaglione	American
Bordeaux	Orchestre National Bordeaux Aquitaine	Joseph Swensen	American
Lille	Orchestre national de Lille	Joshua Weilerstein	American
Lyon	Orchestre National de Lyon	Nikolaj Szeps-Znaider	Danish
Mulhouse	Orchestre symphonique de Mulhouse	Christoph Koncz	Austrian-Hungarian
Marseille	Orchestre philharmonique de Marseille	Michele Spotti	Italian
Nantes	Orchestre national des Pays de la Loire	Sascha Goetzel	Austrian
Paris	Ensemble Intercontemporain	Pierre Bleuse	French
Paris	Orchestre de Chambre de Paris	Thomas Hengelbrock	German
Paris	Orchestre de Paris	Klaus Mäkelä	Finnish
Paris	Orchestre National de France	Cristian Măcelaru	Romanian
Paris	Orchestre Philharmonique de Radio France	Mikko Franck	Finnish
Rennes	Orchestre Symphonique de Bretagne	Nicholas Ellis	Canadian
Strasbourg	Orchestre philharmonique de Strasbourg	Aziz Shokhakimov	Uzbek
Toulouse	Orchestre national du Capitole de Toulouse	Tarmo Peltokoski	Finnish

== Germany ==
City	Orchestra	Conductor	Nationality
Bamberg	Bamberg Symphony	Jakub Hrůša	Czech
Berlin	Berlin Philharmonic Orchestra	Kirill Petrenko	Russian
Berlin	Berlin Radio Symphony Orchestra	Vladimir Jurowski	Russian
Berlin	Deutsches Symphonie-Orchester Berlin	Kazuki Yamada	Japanese
Berlin	Konzerthausorchester Berlin	Joana Mallwitz	German
Berlin	Staatskapelle Berlin	Christian Thielemann	German
Berlin	Utopia	Teodor Currentzis	Greek
Bielefeld	Bielefelder Philharmoniker	Robin Davis	British
Bochum	Bochumer Symphoniker	Tung-Chieh Chuang	Taiwanese
Bremen	Bremer Philharmoniker	Marko Letonja	Slovenian
Cologne	Gürzenich Orchestra Cologne	Andrés Orozco-Estrada	Colombian
Cologne	WDR Funkhausorchester	Frank Strobel	German
Cologne	WDR Symphony Orchestra Cologne	Cristian Măcelaru	Romanian
Dortmund	Dortmunder Philharmoniker	Jordan de Souza	Canadian
Dresden	Dresden Philharmonic Orchestra	Donald Runnicles	British
Dresden	Staatskapelle Dresden	Daniele Gatti	Italian
Essen	Essen Philharmonic	Tomáš Netopil	Czech
Frankfurt	Frankfurter Opern- und Museumsorchester	Thomas Guggeis	German
Frankfurt	hr-Sinfonieorchester	Alain Altinoglu	French
Halle	Staatskapelle Halle	Fabrice Bollon	French
Hamburg	Hamburger Symphoniker	Sylvain Cambreling	French
Hamburg	NDR Symphony Orchestra	Alan Gilbert	American
Hanover	NDR Radiophilharmonie	Stanislav Kochanovsky	Russian
Hanover	Niedersächsisches Staatsorchester Hannover	Stephan Zilias	German
Heidelberg	Philharmonisches Orchester Heidelberg	Elias Grandy	German
Herford	Nordwestdeutsche Philharmonie	Jonathon Bloxham	British
Hilchenbach	Philharmonie Südwestfalen	Charles Olivieri-Munroe	Maltese
Jena	Jenaer Philharmonie	Simon Gaudenz	Swiss
Karlsruhe	Badische Staatskapelle	Justin Brown	British
Koblenz	Staatsorchester Rheinische Philharmonie	Benjamin Shwartz	American-Israeli
Konstanz	Südwestdeutsche Philharmonie Konstanz	Ari Rasilainen	Finnish
Ludwigshafen am Rhein	Staatsphilharmonie Rheinland-Pfalz	Michael Francis	British
Leipzig	Leipzig Gewandhaus Orchestra	Andris Nelsons	Latvian
Leipzig	MDR Leipzig Radio Symphony Orchestra	Dennis Russell Davies	American
Lübeck	Philharmonisches Orchester der Hansestadt Lübeck	Ryusuke Numajiri	Japanese
Munich	Bavarian Radio Symphony Orchestra	Sir Simon Rattle	British
Munich	Bavarian State Orchestra	Vladimir Jurowski	Russian
Munich	Munich Philharmonic Orchestra	Lahav Shani	Israeli
Munich	Munich Radio Orchestra	Ivan Repušić	Croatian
Munich	Munich Symphony Orchestra	Joseph Bastian	French-Swiss
Nuremberg	Nuremberg Symphony Orchestra	Jonathan Darlington	British
Nuremberg	Staatsphilharmonie Nürnberg	Roland Boer	German
Recklinghausen	Neue Philharmonie Westfalen	Rasmus Baumann	German
Saarbrücken	Deutsche Radio Philharmonie Saarbrücken Kaiserslautern	Josep Pons	Spanish-Catalan
Stuttgart	Stuttgarter Philharmoniker	Dan Ettinger	Israeli
Stuttgart	SWR Symphonieorchester	François-Xavier Roth	French
Weimar	Staatskapelle Weimar	Ivan Repušić	Croatian
Wuppertal	Sinfonieorchesters Wuppertal	Patrick Hahn	Austrian

== Hong Kong ==
City	Orchestra	Conductor	Nationality
Hong Kong	City Chamber Orchestra of Hong Kong	Jean Thorel	French
Hong Kong	Hong Kong Philharmonic Orchestra	Tarmo Peltokoski	Finnish
Hong Kong	Hong Kong Sinfonietta	Christoph Poppen	German

== Hungary ==
City	Orchestra	Conductor	Nationality
Budapest	Budapest Festival Orchestra	Iván Fischer	Hungarian
Budapest	Budapest Philharmonic Orchestra	Pinchas Steinberg	Israeli
Budapest	Concerto Budapest	András Keller	Hungarian
Budapest	Hungarian Radio Symphony Orchestra	Riccardo Frizza	Italian
Budapest	MÁV Symphony Orchestra	Róbert Farkas	Hungarian
Miskolc	Symphony Orchestra of Miskolc	Tamás Gál	Hungarian

== Iceland ==
City	Orchestra	Conductor	Nationality
Reykjavík	Iceland Symphony Orchestra	Barbara Hannigan	Canadian

== Ireland ==
City	Orchestra	Conductor	Nationality
Dublin	Crash Ensemble	Ryan McAdams	American
Dublin	RTÉ Concert Orchestra	(post vacant)	
Dublin	RTÉ National Symphony Orchestra	Alexander Shelley	British

== Israel ==
City	Orchestra	Conductor	Nationality
Jerusalem	Jerusalem Symphony Orchestra	Julian Rachlin	Lithuanian
Tel Aviv	Israel Chamber Orchestra	Ariel Zuckermann	Israeli
Tel Aviv	Israel Philharmonic Orchestra	Lahav Shani	Israeli

== Italy ==
City	Orchestra	Conductor	Nationality
Bologna	Teatro Comunale di Bologna	Oksana Lyniv	Ukrainian
Florence	Orchestra del Maggio Musicale Fiorentino	Daniele Gatti	Italian
Florence	Orchestra della Toscana	Eva Ollikainen	Finnish
Milan	Orchestra della Scala	Riccardo Chailly	Italian
Milan	Orchestra i Pomeriggi Musicali	James Feddeck	American
Milan	Orchestra Sinfonica di Milano Giuseppe Verdi	Claus Peter Flor	German
Milan	Orchestra I Solisti di Milano	Matthias Manasi	German
Naples	Orchestra Camerata Italiana	Matthias Manasi	German
Parma (post vacant)	Filarmonica Arturo Toscanini	Kent Nagano	American
Rome	Orchestra dell'Accademia Nazionale di Santa Cecilia	Daniel Harding	British
Turin	RAI National Symphony Orchestra	Andrés Orozco-Estrada	Colombian

== Japan ==
City	Orchestra	Conductor	Nationality
Chiba	Chiba Symphony Orchestra	Kazufumi Yamashita	Japanese
Fukuoka	Kyushu Symphony Orchestra	Gen Ōta	Japanese
Hiroshima	Hiroshima Symphony Orchestra	Christian Arming	Austrian
Ibaraki	Amabile Philharmonic Orchestra	(post vacant)	
Kadoma	Kansai Philharmonic Orchestra	Sachio Fujioka	Japanese
Kanazawa	Orchestra Ensemble Kanazawa	Junichi Hirokami	Japanese
Kobe	Kobe City Chamber Orchestra	Hidemi Suzuki	Japanese
Kyoto	City of Kyoto Symphony Orchestra	Nodoka Okisawa	Japanese
Kyoto	Kyoto Philharmonic Chamber Orchestra	Toshio Yanagisawa	Japanese
Nagoya	Aichi Chamber Orchestra	Kazufumi Yamashita	Japanese
Nagoya	Central Aichi Symphony Orchestra	Kosuke Tsunoda	Japanese
Nagoya	Chubu Philharmonic Orchestra	Sachio Fujioka	Japanese
Nagoya	Nagoya Philharmonic Orchestra	Kentaro Kawase	Japanese
Nishinomiya	Hyogo Performing Arts Center Orchestra	Yutaka Sado	Japanese
Okayama	Okayama Philharmonic Orchestra	(post vacant)	
Omura	Nagasaki OMURA Chamber Ensemble	(post vacant)	
Osaka	Osaka Philharmonic Orchestra	Tadaaki Otaka	Japanese
Osaka	Telemann Chamber Orchestra	Takeharu Nobuhara	Japanese
Sakai	Osaka Symphony Orchestra	Kazufumi Yamashita	Japanese
Sapporo	Sapporo Symphony Orchestra	Elias Grandy	German
Sendai	Sendai Philharmonic Orchestra	Ken Takaseki	Japanese
Shizuoka	Mt. Fuji Philharmonic Orchestra	Ken Takaseki	Japanese
Takamatsu	Seto Philharmonic Orchestra	Noorman Widjaja	Indonesian
Takasaki	Gunma Symphony Orchestra	(post vacant)	
Tokyo	The Geidai Philharmonia Orchestra, Tokyo	Kazufumi Yamashita	Japanese
Tokyo	Japan Philharmonic Orchestra	Kahchun Wong	Singaporean
Tokyo	NHK Symphony Orchestra	Fabio Luisi	Italian
Tokyo	New Japan Philharmonic	Yutaka Sado	Japanese
Tokyo	Pacific Philharmonia Tokyo	Norichika Iimori	Japanese
Tokyo	Tokyo City Philharmonic Orchestra	Ken Takaseki	Japanese
Tokyo	Tokyo Metropolitan Symphony Orchestra	Kazushi Ōno	Japanese
Tokyo	Tokyo Philharmonic Orchestra	Andrea Battistoni	Italian
Tokyo	Tokyo Symphony Orchestra	Lorenzo Viotti	Swiss
Tokyo	Tokyo Universal Philharmony Orchestra	Hakaru Matsuoka	Japanese
Tokyo	Yomiuri Nippon Symphony Orchestra	Sebastian Weigle	German
Toyonaka	The College Operahouse Orchestra	Kunihiko Makimura	Japanese
Toyonaka	Japan Century Symphony Orchestra	Joe Hisaishi	Japanese
Yamagata	Yamagata Symphony Orchestra	Tetsuro Ban	Japanese
Yamatokoriyama	Nara Philharmonic Orchestra	(post vacant)	
Yokohama	Kanagawa Philharmonic Orchestra	Ryusuke Numajiri	Japanese

== Latvia ==
City	Orchestra	Conductor	Nationality
Riga	Kremerata Baltica	Gidon Kremer	Latvian
Riga	Latvian National Symphony Orchestra	Tarmo Peltokoski	Finnish
Liepāja	Liepāja Symphony Orchestra	Gintaras Rinkevičius	Lithuanian

== Liechtenstein ==
City	Orchestra	Conductor	Nationality
Nendeln	Sinfonieorchester Liechtenstein	Stefan Sanderling	German
Vaduz	Orchester Liechtenstein-Werdenberg	Stefan Susana	Austrian

== Luxembourg ==
City	Orchestra	Conductor	Nationality
Luxembourg City	Luxembourg Chamber Orchestra	Corinna Niemeyer	German
Luxembourg City	Luxembourg Philharmonic Orchestra	Martin Rajna	Hungarian

== Macau ==
City	Orchestra	Conductor	Nationality
Macau	Macau Orchestra	Lü Jia	Chinese

== Malaysia ==
City	Orchestra	Conductor	Nationality
Kuala Lumpur	Malaysian Philharmonic Orchestra	Jun Märkl	German

== Mexico ==
City	Orchestra	Conductor	Nationality
Culiacán	Orquesta Sinfónica Sinaloa de las Artes	Miguel Salmon del Real	Mexican
Guadalajara	Jalisco Philharmonic Orchestra	José Luis Castillo	Spanish
Mexico City	Mexico City Philharmonic Orchestra	Scott Yoo	American
Mexico City	National Symphony Orchestra	Ludwig Carrasco	Mexican
Mexico City	OFUNAM	Sylvain Gasançon	French
Mexico City	Minería Symphony Orchestra	Carlos Miguel Prieto	Mexican
Toluca	State of Mexico Symphony Orchestra	Rodrigo Macías	Mexican
Xalapa	Xalapa Symphony Orchestra	Martin Lebel	French

== Netherlands ==
City	Orchestra	Conductor	Nationality
Amsterdam	Amsterdam Sinfonietta	Candida Thompson	British
Amsterdam	Netherlands Chamber Orchestra	(post vacant)	
Amsterdam	Netherlands Philharmonic Orchestra	(post vacant)	
Amsterdam	Royal Concertgebouw Orchestra	Klaus Mäkelä (designate, effective 2027)	Finnish
Enschede	Het Symfonieorkest	Jan Willem de Vriend	Dutch
Groningen	Noord Nederlands Orkest	Eivind Gullberg Jensen	Norwegian
Hilversum	Radio Filharmonisch Orkest	Karina Canellakis	American
Rotterdam	Rotterdam Philharmonic Orchestra	(post vacant)	
The Hague	Residentie Orchestra	Jun Märkl	German

== New Zealand ==
City	Orchestra	Conductor	Nationality
Auckland	Auckland Philharmonia Orchestra	Giordano Bellincampi	Danish
Christchurch	Christchurch Symphony Orchestra	Benjamin Northey	Australian
Wellington	New Zealand Symphony Orchestra	Gemma New	New Zealand
Wellington	Orchestra Wellington	Marc Taddei	American

== Norway ==
City	Orchestra	Conductor	Nationality
Bergen	Bergen Philharmonic Orchestra	Tabita Berglund (designate, effective autumn 2027)	Norwegian
Kristiansand	Kristiansand Symphony Orchestra	Julian Rachlin	Lithuanian
Oslo	Norwegian Radio Orchestra	Holly Hyun Choe	Korean-American
Oslo	Oslo Philharmonic Orchestra	(post vacant)	
Stavanger	Stavanger Symphony Orchestra	Andris Poga	Latvian
Tromsø and Bode	Norwegian Arctic Philharmonic Orchestra	Jakub Przybycień (designate, effective 2027)	Polish
Trondheim	Trondheim Symphony Orchestra	Adam Hickox	British

== Paraguay ==
City	Orchestra	Conductor	Nationality
Asunción	Symphony Orchestra of the City of Asunción	Luis Szarán	Paraguayan
Asunción	Symphony Orchestra of the National Congress of Paraguay	Diego Sanchez Haase	Paraguayan
Asunción	Recycled Orchestra of Cateura	Favio Chavez	Argentinian

== Philippines ==
City	Orchestra	Conductor	Nationality
Cebu	Cebu Philharmonic Orchestra	Reynaldo Abellana	Filipino
Manila	Manila Symphony Orchestra	Marlon Chen	Taiwanese-American
Manila	Philippine Philharmonic Orchestra	Grzegorz Nowak	Polish

== Poland ==
City	Orchestra	Conductor	Nationality
Gdańsk	Polish Baltic Philharmonic	George Tchitchinadze	Georgian
Katowice	Polish National Radio Symphony Orchestra	Marin Alsop	American
Kraków	Kraków Philharmonic Orchestra	Charles Olivieri-Munroe	Canadian
Łódź	Łódź Philharmonic	Michał Nesterowicz	Polish
Poznań	Poznań Philharmonic	Łukasz Borowicz	Polish
Radom	Radom Chamber Orchestra	Marek Drewnowski	Polish
Szczecin	Orkiestra Symfoniczna Filharmonii w Szczecinie	Rune Bergmann	Norwegian
Warsaw	Warsaw National Philharmonic Orchestra	Krzysztof Urbański	Polish
Warsaw	Sinfonia Varsovia	(post vacant)	
Wrocław	NFM Wrocław Philharmonic	Christoph Eschenbach	German

== Portugal ==
City	Orchestra	Conductor	Nationality
Lisbon	Gulbenkian Orchestra	Hannu Lintu	Finnish
Lisbon	Orquestra Sinfónica Portuguesa	Joana Carneiro	Portuguese
Lisbon	Orquestra Metropolitana de Lisboa	Pedro Amaral	Portuguese
Porto	Orquestra Sinfónica do Porto Casa da Música	Baldur Brönnimann	Swiss

== Russia ==
City	Orchestra	Conductor	Nationality
Moscow	Moscow City Symphony Orchestra	Dmitri Jurowski	Russian
Moscow	National Philharmonic of Russia	Vladimir Spivakov	Russian
Moscow	Russian National Orchestra	Alexander Rudin	Russian
Moscow	State Academic Symphony Orchestra of the Russian Federation	(post vacant)	
Saint Petersburg	Mariinsky Theatre Orchestra	Valery Gergiev	Russian
Saint Petersburg	musicAeterna	Teodor Currentzis	Greek
Saint Petersburg	Saint Petersburg Philharmonic Orchestra	Nikolai Alexeev	Russian

== Singapore ==
City	Orchestra	Conductor	Nationality
Singapore	Singapore Symphony Orchestra	Hannu Lintu	Finnish

== Slovakia ==
City	Orchestra	Conductor	Nationality
Bratislava	Slovak Radio Symphony Orchestra	Mario Košik	Slovak

== Slovenia ==
City	Orchestra	Conductor	Nationality
Ljubljana	RTV Slovenia Symphony Orchestra	Liu Kuokman	Hong Kong
Ljubljana	Slovenian Philharmonic Orchestra	Kakhi Solomnishvili	Georgian

== South Korea ==
City	Orchestra	Conductor	Nationality
Bucheon	Bucheon Philharmonic Orchestra	Lim Hun Joung	South Korean
Busan	Busan Philharmonic Orchestra	(post vacant)	
Daegu	Daegu Philharmonic Orchestra	Julian Kovatchev	Bulgarian
Gyeonggi	Gyeonggi Philharmonic Orchestra	Shi-Yeon Sung	South Korean
Seongnam	Seongnam Philharmonic Orchestra	Gum Nanse	South Korean
Incheon	Incheon Philharmonic Orchestra	Chung Chiyong	South Korean
Seoul	KBS Symphony Orchestra	Myung-whun Chung	Korean
Seoul	Seoul Philharmonic Orchestra	Jaap van Zweden	Dutch
Suwon	Suwon Philharmonic Orchestra	Kim Daejin	South Korean

== Spain ==
City	Orchestra	Conductor	Nationality
A Coruña	Orquesta Sinfónica de Galicia	Dima Slobodeniouk	Russian
Barcelona	Barcelona Symphony and Catalonia National Orchestra	Ludovic Morlot	French
Barcelona	Orquestra Simfònica del Gran Teatre del Liceu	Jonathan Nott	British
Donostia-San Sebastian	Basque National Orchestra	(post vacant)	
Granada	City of Granada Orchestra	Andrea Marcon	Italian
Madrid	RTVE Symphony Orchestra	Christoph König	German
Madrid	Spanish National Orchestra	Kent Nagano	American
Navarra	Orquesta Sinfónica de Navarra	Antoni Wit	Polish
Oviedo	Orquesta Sinfónica Del Principado De Asturias	Rossen Milanov	Bulgarian
Valencia	Orquesta de Valencia	Alexander Liebreich	German
Valencia	Orquestra de la Comunitat Valenciana	Sir Mark Elder	British
Zaragoza	ORA Orquesta Reino de Aragón	Ricardo Casero	Spanish

== Sweden ==
City	Orchestra	Conductor	Nationality
Gävle	Gävle Symphony Orchestra	Christian Reif	German
Gothenburg	Gothenburg Symphony Orchestra	(post vacant)	
Malmö	Malmö Symphony Orchestra	Martyn Brabbins	British
Norrköping	Norrköping Symphony Orchestra	Karl-Heinz Steffens	German
Örebro	Swedish Chamber Orchestra	Martin Fröst	Swedish
Stockholm	Royal Stockholm Philharmonic Orchestra	Ryan Bancroft	American
Stockholm	Swedish Radio Symphony Orchestra	Andrés Orozco-Estrada	Colombian

== Switzerland ==
City	Orchestra	Conductor	Nationality
Basel	Sinfonieorchester Basel	Markus Poschner	German
Bern	Bern Symphony Orchestra	Krzysztof Urbański	Polish
Geneva	Orchestre de la Suisse Romande	Tugan Sokhiev	Russian
Lausanne	Sinfonietta de Lausanne	David Reiland	Belgian
Lucerne	Lucerne Symphony Orchestra	Michael Sanderling	German
Winterthur	Orchester Musikkollegium Winterthur	Thomas Zehetmair	Austrian
Zurich	Philharmonia Zürich	Gianandrea Noseda	Italian
Zurich	Tonhalle Orchester Zürich	Paavo Järvi	Estonian
Zurich	Zurich Chamber Orchestra	Daniel Hope	British

== Taiwan ==
City	Orchestra	Conductor	Nationality
Taipei	Taiwan Philharmonic	Jun Märkl	German
Taipei	Taipei Symphony Orchestra	Alexander Liebreich	German

== United Kingdom ==
City	Orchestra	Conductor	Nationality
Bangor, County Down	Camerata Ireland	Barry Douglas	British
Belfast	Ulster Orchestra	Anna Handler	German-Colombian
Birmingham	City of Birmingham Symphony Orchestra	Kazuki Yamada	Japanese
Bournemouth	Bournemouth Symphony Orchestra	Mark Wigglesworth	British
Cambridge	Academy of Ancient Music	Laurence Cummings	British
Cardiff	BBC National Orchestra of Wales	(post vacant)	
Derby	Sinfonia ViVA	Frank Zielhorst	Dutch
Edinburgh	Scottish Chamber Orchestra	Maxim Emelyanychev	Russian
Gateshead	Royal Northern Sinfonia	Dinis Sousa	Portuguese
Glasgow	BBC Scottish Symphony Orchestra	Ryan Wigglesworth	British
Glasgow	Royal Scottish National Orchestra	Thomas Søndergård	Danish
Leeds	Orchestra of Opera North	Garry Walker	British
Liverpool	Royal Liverpool Philharmonic	Domingo Hindoyan	Venezuelan
London	Academy of St Martin in the Fields	Joshua Bell	American
London	Aurora Orchestra	Nicholas Collon	British
London	BBC Concert Orchestra	Anna-Maria Helsing	Finnish-Swedish
London	BBC Symphony Orchestra	Sakari Oramo	Finnish
London	City of London Sinfonia	Stephen Layton	British
London	The English Concert	Harry Bicket	British
London	London Chamber Orchestra	Christopher Warren-Green	British
London	London Mozart Players	Jonathan Bloxham	British
London	London Philharmonic Orchestra	Edward Gardner	British
London	London Symphony Orchestra	Sir Antonio Pappano	British
London	Philharmonia Orchestra	Santtu-Matias Rouvali	Finnish
London	Royal Philharmonic Orchestra	Vasily Petrenko	Russian
Manchester	The Hallé	Kahchun Wong	Singaporean
Manchester	Manchester Camerata	Gábor Takács-Nagy	Hungarian
Manchester	Northern Chamber Orchestra	Nicholas Ward	British
Salford	BBC Philharmonic	John Storgårds	Finnish
Stratford-upon-Avon	Orchestra of the Swan	Kenneth Woods	American
Worcester	English Symphony Orchestra	Kenneth Woods	American

== United States ==
City	Orchestra	Conductor	Nationality
Akron, Ohio	Akron Symphony Orchestra	Christopher Wilkins	American
Albany, Georgia	Albany Symphony Orchestra	Claire Fox Hillard	American
Albany, New York	Albany Symphony Orchestra	David Alan Miller	American
Albuquerque, New Mexico	New Mexico Philharmonic	Roberto Minczuk	Brazilian
Allentown, PA	Allentown Symphony Orchestra	Diane Wittry	American
Amarillo, Texas	Amarillo Symphony Orchestra	George Jackson	British
Anchorage, Alaska	Anchorage Symphony Orchestra	Elizabeth Schulze	American
Athens, Georgia	Athens Symphony	Brad Maffett	American
Atlanta	Atlanta Symphony Orchestra	Nathalie Stutzmann	French
Baltimore	Baltimore Symphony Orchestra	Jonathon Heyward	American
Beaumont, TX	Symphony of Southeast Texas	Chelsea Tipton II	American
Bellingham, WA	Bellingham Symphony Orchestra	Yaniv Attar	Israeli-American
Berkeley	Berkeley Symphony Orchestra	(post vacant)	
Birmingham, Alabama	Alabama Symphony Orchestra	Carlos Izcaray	Venezuelan
Boston	Boston Symphony Orchestra	Andris Nelsons	Latvian
Boston	Handel and Haydn Society	Jonathan Cohen	British
Buffalo, New York	Buffalo Philharmonic Orchestra	JoAnn Falletta	American
Burlington, Vermont	Vermont Symphony Orchestra	Andrew Crust	American
Carrollton, Georgia	Carroll Symphony Orchestra	Terry Lowry	American
Charlotte, North Carolina	Charlotte Symphony Orchestra	Kwamé Ryan	Trinidadian
Chicago	Chicago Symphony Orchestra	Klaus Mäkelä (designate, effective 2027)	Finnish
Cincinnati	Cincinnati Symphony Orchestra	Cristian Măcelaru	Romanian
Cleveland	The Cleveland Orchestra	Franz Welser-Möst	Austrian
Colorado Springs	Colorado Springs Philharmonic	Chloé Dufresne	French
Columbus, Ohio	Columbus Symphony Orchestra	Rossen Milanov	Bulgarian
Costa Mesa, California	Pacific Symphony	Alexander Shelley	British
Dallas	Dallas Symphony Orchestra	Fabio Luisi	Italian
Dayton	Dayton Philharmonic Orchestra	Neal Gittleman	American
Denver	Colorado Symphony Orchestra	Peter Oundjian	British
Detroit	Detroit Symphony Orchestra	Jader Bignamini	Italian
Durham	Durham Symphony Orchestra	William Curry	American
Fort Worth, Texas	Fort Worth Symphony Orchestra	Robert Spano	American
Fort Lauderdale, Florida	South Florida Philharmonic	Donald Covert	American
Glen Ellyn, Illinois	New Philharmonic	Kirk Muspratt	Canadian-American
Grand Rapids, Michigan	Grand Rapids Symphony	Marcelo Lehninger	Brazilian
Greensboro, North Carolina	Greensboro Symphony Orchestra	Christopher Dragon	Australian
Lawrenceville, Georgia	Gwinnett Symphony Orchestra	Robert Trocina	American
Harrisburg, Pennsylvania	Harrisburg Symphony Orchestra	Stuart Malina	American
Hartford, Connecticut	Hartford Symphony Orchestra	Carolyn Kuan	American
Houston	Houston Symphony Orchestra	Juraj Valčuha	Slovenian
Indianapolis	Indianapolis Symphony Orchestra	Jun Märkl	German
Jacksonville, Florida	Jacksonville Symphony	Courtney Lewis	British
Kansas City, Missouri	Kansas City Symphony	Matthias Pintscher	German
Knoxville, Tennessee	Knoxville Symphony Orchestra	Aram Demirjian	American
Las Vegas	Las Vegas Philharmonic Orchestra	Rei Hotoda	Japanese-American
Lexington, Kentucky	Lexington Philharmonic Orchestra	Mélisse Brunet	French
Little Rock, Arkansas	Arkansas Symphony Orchestra	(post vacant)	
Los Angeles	Hollywood Symphony Orchestra	John Beal	American
Los Angeles	Los Angeles Chamber Orchestra	Jaime Martín	Spanish
Los Angeles	Los Angeles Philharmonic	Daniel Harding (designate, effective 2027)	British
Louisville, Kentucky	The Louisville Orchestra	Teddy Abrams	American
Memphis, Tennessee	Memphis Symphony Orchestra	Robert Moody	American
Milwaukee	Milwaukee Symphony Orchestra	(post vacant)	
Minneapolis	Minnesota Orchestra	Thomas Søndergård	Danish
Munster, Indiana |Northwest Indiana Symphony Orchestra	Kirk Muspratt	Canadian-American	
Naples, Florida	Naples Philharmonic Orchestra	Alexander Shelley	British
Nashville	Nashville Symphony Orchestra	Leonard Slatkin	American
New Orleans, Louisiana	Louisiana Philharmonic Orchestra	Carlos Miguel Prieto	Mexican
New York City	American Composers Orchestra	(post vacant)	
New York City	The MET Orchestra	Yannick Nézet-Séguin	Canadian
New York City	New York Philharmonic	Gustavo Dudamel	Venezuelan
New York City	Orchestra of St. Luke's	(post vacant)	
Newark, New Jersey	New Jersey Symphony Orchestra	Xian Zhang	Chinese
Norfolk, Virginia	Virginia Symphony Orchestra	Eric Jacobsen	American
Omaha	Omaha Symphony Orchestra	(post vacant)	
Orlando	Orlando Philharmonic Orchestra	Eric Jacobsen	American
Philadelphia	Chamber Orchestra of Philadelphia	David Hayes	Belgian
Philadelphia	The Philadelphia Orchestra	Yannick Nézet-Séguin	Canadian
Phoenix, Arizona	Phoenix Symphony Orchestra	Paolo Bortolameolli (designate, effective autumn 2027)	Chilean-Italian
Pittsburgh	Pittsburgh Symphony Orchestra	Manfred Honeck	Austrian
Portland, Oregon	Oregon Symphony	David Danzmayr	Austrian
Raleigh, North Carolina	North Carolina Symphony	Carlos Miguel Prieto	Mexican
Reno, Nevada	Reno Philharmonic Orchestra	Laura Jackson	American
Richmond, Virginia	Richmond Symphony Orchestra	Valentina Peleggi	Italian
Rochester, New York	Rochester Philharmonic Orchestra	Andreas Delfs	German
Rockford, Illinois	Rockford Symphony Orchestra	Yaniv Attar	Israeli-American
St. Louis	Saint Louis Symphony Orchestra	Stéphane Denève	French
Salt Lake City	Utah Symphony	Markus Poschner (designate, effective 2027)	German
San Diego	San Diego Symphony	Rafael Payare	Venezuelan
San Francisco	San Francisco Philharmonic	Jessica Bejarano	American
San Francisco	San Francisco Symphony	Elim Chan (designate, effective 2027)	Hong Kong-British
Santa Rosa	Santa Rosa Symphony	Francesco Lecce-Chong	American
Sarasota, Florida	Sarasota Orchestra	Giancarlo Guerrero	Costa Rican
Seattle	Seattle Symphony Orchestra	Xian Zhang	Chinese
Tampa, Florida	The Florida Orchestra	Michael Francis	British
Toledo, Ohio	Toledo Symphony Orchestra	Alain Trudel	Canadian
Virginia Beach, Virginia	Symphonicity	Daniel W. Boothe	American
Washington, D.C.	National Symphony Orchestra	Gianandrea Noseda	Italian
Wilmington, Delaware	Delaware Symphony Orchestra	Michelle Di Russo	Argentinean-Italian

== Venezuela ==
City	Orchestra	Conductor	Nationality
Caracas	Orquesta Sinfónica Simón Bolívar	Gustavo Dudamel	Venezuelan

== Vietnam ==
City	Orchestra	Conductor	Nationality
Hanoi	Vietnam National Symphony Orchestra	Tetsuji Honna	Japanese
