= Okanagan Symphony Orchestra =

- Orchestra
- Former name: Okanagan Valley Symphony Orchestra
- Founded: 1959
- Location: Okanagan Valley, British Columbia, Canada
- Concert hall: Kelowna Community Theatre, Kelowna; Cleland Theatre, Penticton; Vernon and District Performing Arts Centre, Vernon
- Music director: Julian Pellicano
- Website: Official website

The Okanagan Symphony Orchestra (OSO) is a professional orchestra in the Okanagan Valley of British Columbia, Canada. It gives regular-season concerts in Kelowna, Penticton, and Vernon. Its music director is Julian Pellicano.

== History ==
=== Founding and early years (1959–1963) ===
The Okanagan Symphony Orchestra was founded in 1959 as the Okanagan Valley Symphony Orchestra. The orchestra was organized by Willem Bertsch together with volunteers including Eva Cleland of Penticton, Jean Bulman of Vernon, and Wilbur Hill of Westbank.

The orchestra held its first rehearsal on October 4, 1959, in the Penticton High School auditorium, with 25 musicians. Wilbur Hill served as the first board president, and the Okanagan Symphony Society was established in 1960 to govern the orchestra.

The orchestra's first concert series included performances in Vernon, Kelowna, and Revelstoke. Pianist Joey Karen of Vernon was the orchestra's first soloist, performing George Gershwin's Rhapsody in Blue. Over the next two seasons the orchestra also performed in Kamloops, Oliver, and Summerland. In 1962–63 it collaborated with the Canadian School of Ballet in Kelowna, for which choreographer Gweneth Lloyd set a ballet to Mozart's Eine kleine Nachtmusik.

=== Leonard Camplin era (1964–1996) ===
Leonard Camplin became music director and conductor of the Okanagan Symphony Orchestra in 1964 and led it until his retirement in 1996. During his tenure the orchestra changed from a largely amateur community ensemble into a professional orchestra. George Kiraly was the orchestra's first full-time professional musician. The orchestra also gave touring concerts with the CBC Vancouver Orchestra under John Avison, and joint concerts with the Vancouver Metropolitan Orchestra.

In 1970 the orchestra dropped "Valley" from its name and became the Okanagan Symphony Orchestra. In 1970, Joycelyn Pritchard of Vernon founded the Okanagan Symphony Choir, which performed choral-orchestral works with the orchestra, including Handel's Messiah, the Mozart and Verdi requiems, Orff's Carmina Burana, and Mendelssohn's Elijah. Imant Raminsh succeeded Pritchard as choir director in 1978.

From 1976 to 1977 Camplin recruited a core of professional contract musicians, many of whom taught at community music schools. Violinist Denis Letourneau served as concertmaster from 1978 to 2016. In 1981 the orchestra established the OSO Sinfonia, a chamber orchestra conducted by Camplin, which toured the region, performed in schools, and appeared on CBC radio and television.

The orchestra's season expanded during the 1970s and 1980s. It gave 16 concerts in the 1979–80 season. Kamloops was a performance city from 1976 to 1980, and in 1982 Salmon Arm joined the concert circuit. By 1991 the orchestra had a core of 30 professional musicians and presented six concerts in each of its four host communities: Kelowna, Penticton, Vernon, and Salmon Arm. By the mid-1990s it presented 32 subscription concerts a season, plus school concerts, special events, and Sinfonia tours.

The orchestra regularly programmed music by British Columbian and other Canadian composers, including Raminsh, Jean Coulthard, Michael Conway Baker, and Malcolm Forsyth. In 1984, it received a national award from the Performing Rights Organization of Canada for imaginative programming of contemporary music, and Bertsch returned to conduct part of its Silver Jubilee concert. Raminsh organized the Okanagan Symphony Youth Orchestra in 1988. A performance by the orchestra was broadcast nationally on CBC Radio in 1989. In 1993 the orchestra's musicians voted to join the American Federation of Musicians under a collective agreement.

Camplin retired after his final concert in May 1996 and was named conductor laureate. He died on October 14, 2024, at the age of 96.

=== Douglas Sanford era (1997–2005) ===
Douglas Sanford was music director and conductor from 1997 to 2005. In 1998 he introduced open dress rehearsals and pre-concert lectures, and established a mentoring program that gave emerging musicians experience in a professional orchestra. Works performed during his tenure included Beethoven's Symphony No. 9 in 2000, Mahler's Symphony No. 9 in 2001, Bartók's The Miraculous Mandarin in 2002, and Mussorgsky's Pictures at an Exhibition in 2003.

In 2004 the orchestra hosted the National Arts Centre Orchestra performing Vivaldi's The Four Seasons, with Pinchas Zukerman as soloist and conductor. A companion concert for school audiences, conducted by Boris Brott, presented Vivaldi's music through the perspectives of Canadian First Nations communities.

The orchestra organized its 2005–06 season in part as a search for Sanford's successor, with six candidates each conducting audition concerts.

=== Rosemary Thomson era (2006–2023) ===
The two finalists in the music director search, Pierre Simard and Rosemary Thomson, shared the conducting of the Okanagan Symphony Orchestra's 2006–07 season. In March 2007 Thomson was appointed as music director. Thomson led the orchestra for 16 seasons.

The orchestra gave its first complete performance of Holst's The Planets in 2009. In 2010 it paired Beethoven's Symphony No. 9 with Ad Astra, a new work by Raminsh commissioned with Canada Council support. Thomson founded the current Okanagan Symphony Chorus in 2010, and in 2012 the Okanagan Symphony Youth Orchestra came under the orchestra's umbrella. She co-conducted the youth orchestra with Dennis Colpitts until 2023. She also initiated several community programs, including Symphony Storytime concerts for young children, the Middle School Band Clinic, Your Symphony at the Library, and the Okanagan Symphony Youth Chorus. The orchestra marked its 60th anniversary in February 2020 with concerts featuring four soloists who were graduates of the youth orchestra.

In 2023 the orchestra announced that Thomson would retire at the end of the 2023–24 season. Three months later, in December 2023, the board of directors ended her tenure, and it did not publicly disclose its reasons. The Okanagan Symphony Players Association issued an open letter, and a petition calling for Thomson's reinstatement gathered more than 2,300 signatures. Thomson said she planned to take legal action. The orchestra completed the 2023–24 season with guest conductors, and Thomson and the orchestra later reached an agreement. Thomson conducted her final concerts with the orchestra in May 2024 and assumed the title of conductor emeritus.

=== Recent history (2024–present) ===
The orchestra's search for a new music director resulted in four finalists, Nadège Foofat, James Sommerville, Grant Harville, and Julian Pellicano. Each conducted a concert during the 2024–25 season. In June 2025, the OSO announced Pellicano as its sixth music director and conductor.

Pellicano made his OSO music-director debut in February 2026 with "Julian Conducts Tchaikovsky". At the OSO's May 2026 season finale, Pellicano conducted Beethoven's Fifth Symphony.

== Music directors ==
Music director	Years	Notes
Willem Bertsch	1959–1963	Founder and first conductor
Douglas Talney	1963–1964	Interim conductor
Leonard Camplin	1964–1996	Conductor laureate from 1996
Douglas Sanford	1997–2005	
Rosemary Thomson	2006–2023	Conductor emeritus from 2024
Julian Pellicano	2025–present	

== Venues ==
The Okanagan Symphony Orchestra performs regular-season concerts in three Okanagan Valley communities: Kelowna, Penticton, and Vernon.

Its Kelowna venue is Kelowna Community Theatre, the Penticton venue is Cleland Community Theatre, and its Vernon venue is Vernon and District Performing Arts Centre.

== Affiliated ensembles ==
The Okanagan Symphony Choir was established in 1970. It was first directed by Joycelyn Pritchard of Vernon. Imant Raminsh became choir director in 1978. The current Okanagan Symphony Chorus performs in one or two OSO concerts per season.

The Okanagan Symphony Youth Orchestra was organized in 1988 by Raminsh. Dennis Colpitts and Rosemary Thomson co-conducted it from 2010 to 2023, followed by Zeena Zaiyouna from 2023 to 2026. In September 2026 the OSO appointed Jeff Faragher as the youth orchestra's conductor for the 2026/27 season. The youth orchestra participates in OSO programs and community projects, including the Apollo Initiative.

== Community engagement and education ==
The Okanagan Symphony Orchestra operates community and education programs with schools, libraries, cultural organizations, and community partners across the Okanagan Valley.

Symphony Storytime is a series of interactive concerts for toddlers and families. The concerts feature different orchestral instruments, and include musicians from the OSO and the Okanagan Symphony Youth Orchestra. The program has been presented at the Centre culturel francophone de l'Okanagan in Kelowna.

Other OSO community programs include Symphony School Shows, coordinated with School Districts 23, 53, and 83, Pocket Orchestra events, and Musicians in the Making pre-concert presentations.
