= Natalie Galstyan =

Armenian conductor (born 1975)

Natalie Galstyan

Natalie Aregi Galstyan (Նատալի Գալստյան, born 25 November 1975) is an Armenian conductor. She has served as the principal conductor of the KOHAR Symphony Orchestra and Choir since 2015.

== Biography ==
Natalie Galstyan received her initial musical education in the piano class at the Avet Gabrielyan Music School in Yerevan. She subsequently continued her studies at the Romanos Melikyan Music College in Yerevan, graduating with a specialization in musicology and music theory. In 1999, she graduated from the Choral Conducting Department of the Komitas State Conservatory of Yerevan (studying under professors Rafael Mangasaryan and S. Hovhannisyan). As her diploma project, she presented her own arrangements of Armenian folk songs: Hovvakan (Pastoral) and Artsat Jure (The Silver Water).

In 2001, she completed her postgraduate studies (under the supervision of Professor D. Ghazaryan) and was appointed chief choirmaster of the Aram Ter-Hovhannisyan Choir of the Armenian Musical Society (under the artistic direction of Professor D. Zalyan). In 2007, she graduated from the Komitas State Conservatory, specializing in opera and symphonic conducting (in the class of Professor Aram Gharabekyan).

In 2008, she performed as a conductor with the National Chamber Orchestra of Armenia. She was awarded a certificate of honor by the Armenian Musical Society for her contributions to the national musical arts. From 2009 to 2011, she taught in the Department of Opera Training at the Komitas State Conservatory of Yerevan. In April 2009, she founded the "DOMINATUS" vox orchestra, serving as its artistic director and chief conductor. Through numerous concerts in Moscow, Yerevan, and other cities, she has presented her own arrangements—specifically crafted for the ensemble "DOMINATUS"—which feature "singing instruments" and "instrumental voices." She also founded the children’s orchestra and choir "ARCUS - CANTUS."

Beginning in 2012, she served as an assistant conductor for the KOHAR Symphony Orchestra and Choir, under the artistic direction and principal conductorship of Sebouh Abcarian. In 2015, she was appointed principal conductor of the KOHAR Symphony Orchestra and Choir.

In 2019, she was appointed the conductor of Student Symphonic Orchestra of the Yerevan State Conservatory.
