= Jonathan Crow =

Canadian violinist (born 1977)

- Born: October 19, 1977 (age 48); Prince George, British Columbia
- Genres: Classical; chamber music
- Instrument: Violin
- Member of: New Orford String Quartet

Jonathan Crow is a prominent Canadian violinist. He has been the Toronto Symphony Orchestra's concertmaster beginning in 2011. From 2002 to 2006, he was concertmaster of the Orchestre symphonique de Montréal (OSM).

Crow was born in Prince George, British Columbia, Canada.

== Performances and recordings ==
In addition to his role as Concertmaster of the Toronto Symphony Orchestra beginning in 2011, Crow maintains a strong performance and recording schedule as a soloist.

Crow plays a 1738 del Gesù Guarneri violin.

Crow recorded solo violin works of J. S. Bach and Béla Bartók.

Crow recorded the solo violin sections in the Toronto Symphony Orchestra's 2013 recording of Rimsky-Korsakov's Sheherazade conducted by Peter Oundjian for Chandos Records. One music reviewer of BBC Music Magazine claimed that "The main hero of this recording is the Toronto Symphony Orchestra's [concertmaster], Jonathan Crow. His Sheherazade...is a feisty, fearless and engaging storyteller...Crow's playing is almost enough to make this recording a prime version."

Crow performed the Beethoven Violin Concerto in February 2014 with the Toronto Symphony Orchestra conducted by Thomas Dausgaard. One reviewer wrote that "If we expect concertmasters to play it safe, Crow was in no mood to confirm the stereotype. There were many nips and tucks and changes of tempo that kept conductor Thomas Dausgaard busy on the podium. Most effective was the plucky finale, with a sudden, surprising start. The Larghetto was heartfelt; the first movement, personable rather than celestial. Detached phrasing (and even a few rugged spots) invited us to admire the music close-up rather than from afar...The crowd greatly appreciated Crow’s approach."

Crow participated in and played the solo passages of the performance of Vaughan Williams' Fantasia on a Theme by Thomas Tallis by the Toronto Symphony Orchestra conducted by Peter Oundjian.

Crow performed with other members of the TSO Chamber Soloists in the Mozart Clarinet Quintet.

Crow participated in the TSO performance of Wagner's Siegfried Idyll conducted by Peter Oundjian shortly before Oundjian completed his music directorship with the orchestra.

Crow has continued as Concertmaster with the TSO under the current directorship of Gustavo Gimeno, performing in Gimeno's inaugural concert which included the Ravel Daphnis et Chloé, Suite No. 2.

In 2021, he performed the Beethoven "Spring" sonata for violin and piano with Angela Park, a professor of piano at University of Western Ontario.

In 2022 Crow performed the Beethoven Sonata for Piano and Violin, No. 10 in G Major, Op. 96 with pianist Philip Chiu.

In January 2023, Crow performed the Brahms Violin Concerto with the Toronto Symphony Orchestra conducted by Tarmo Peltokoski. One reviewer noted that "...listeners voted with their feet and the thunderous multiple standing ovations for guest conductor Tarmo Peltokoski and violinist Jonathan Crow...the intensity and seriousness of Crow’s playing, his warmth, and technical mastery (highlighted in the brilliant cadenza) are well known to TSO fans...in Crow’s hands, Brahms’s only violin concerto is sheer beauty."

In the 2023-2024 concert season, Crow performed the Violin Concerto of Béla Bartók with both the Kindred Spirits Orchestra and with the Oakville Symphony Orchestra.

On 2 and 4 October 2025, Crow performed the Mendelssohn Violin Concerto with the Toronto Symphony Orchestra conducted by Peter Oundjian. One reviewer stated that Crow "went with the natural flow and uplifting rhythmic impetus of the opening, counterbalancing it with the poetic nobility of the second subject" and that the "slow movement was delicately serene, warm and sweet-toned, without a grain of excess sugar, and the finale’s effervescent energy had plenty of charm...".

On 23 November 2025, Crow participated in a concert at St. John the Evangelist Church in London, Ontario, Canada with the Toronto Symphony Orchestra Chamber Soloists. He performed the Violin Concerto in E Major, BWV 1042 by J.S. Bach and also the Concerto for Violin and Oboe in C Minor, BWV 1060R by J. S. Bach with oboist Sarah Jeffrey, Principal Oboe of the Toronto Symphony Orchestra.

In February 2027, Crow will perform the William Walton Violin Concerto with the Toronto Symphony Orchestra.

He is also a violinist in the New Orford String Quartet.

== Teaching ==
In 2005 Jonathan Crow joined the Schulich School of Music at McGill University as Assistant Professor of Violin and was appointed Associate Professor of Violin in 2010. He is currently Associate Professor of Violin at the University of Toronto, Faculty of Music.

== Notes ==
- University of Toronto Faculty of Music Biography
- Jonathan Crow TSO biography
- Jonathan Crow Centre d'arts Orford biography
