= Kelowna Community Theatre =

Coordinates: 49.889485°N 119.496059°W

- Interactive map of the Kelowna Community Theatre area

General information
- Type: Arts complex
- Location: 1375 Water Street; Kelowna, British Columbia; V1Y 0B4
- Completed: 1968
- Opened: 1967

The Kelowna Community Theatre is an 853-seat Theatre in Kelowna, British Columbia, Canada. It is the home of the Kelowna Community Concert Society and is also the home of the Okanagan Symphony Orchestra and has been since it opened.
