= Sarah Jeffrey =

Canadian oboist and teacher

- Born: London, Ontario, Canada
- Occupations: Instrumentalist; Teacher
- Instrument: Oboe
- Website: www.tso.ca/performer/sarah-jeffrey

Sarah Jeffrey is an internationally acclaimed Canadian oboist and teacher.

== Career ==
Jeffrey is Principal Oboe with the Toronto Symphony Orchestra, a position she assumed in the 2005-2006 season, occupying the Cathy and Liddy Beck Principal Oboe Chair. She had previously been principal oboe with the Kitchener-Waterloo Symphony Orchestra, the Orchestre Symphonique de Québec, and the Windsor Symphony Orchestra.

Jeffrey has performed as a chamber musician guest soloist with Trio Arkel and Amici Chamber Ensemble.

She is a faculty member at the University of Toronto, and The Glenn Gould School of The Royal Conservatory of Music.

== Performances and recordings ==
On 22 May 2008, Jeffrey and violinist James Ehnes performed the Bach Concerto for Violin and Oboe with the Toronto Symphony Orchestra. Four years later, Jeffery would perform this work with violinist Itzhak Perlman and the TSO.

Jeffrey performed on 15 March 2015 with Trio Arkel in the Mozart Oboe Quartet and the Phantasy Quartet for Oboe and Strings by Benjamin Britten.

Jeffrey and her husband Gabriel Radford, who is a French hornist with the Toronto Symphony Orchestra, recorded Ronald Royer's Rhapsody for Oboe and French horn in 2017 with members of the Scarborough Philharmonic Orchestra conducted by the composer and music director, a work commissioned for them to perform together.

Jeffrey has recorded the Vaughan Williams Oboe Concerto with Peter Oundjian conducting the Toronto Symphony Orchestra for Chandos Records in 2017. The recording was nominated for two Grammy Awards, Best Classical Compendium and Best Producer, with the latter nomination winning the Grammy Award. The recording won a Juno Award for Best Classical Orchestra recording. One music critic described Jeffrey's performance as "perhaps the finest recording of the piece ever made." Another review stated that "Vaughan Williams’ Oboe Concerto opens with an exuberant solo passage which takes the instrument from the very bottom to the very top of its range. Whereas some oboists struggle to get more than an ugly honk out of the low notes, Jeffrey makes each one a thing of beauty. And her top notes are remarkably secure and full-throated."

On 27, 28, and 29 September 2019, Jeffrey performed the Strauss Oboe Concerto with the Toronto Symphony Orchestra. One reviewer stated that "There could be nothing but praise for the exquisitely autumnal tone of this player in the Andante and the delightful articulation of the finale. Cadenzas spoke with the human quality for which the instrument is renowned, at least when played like this."

Jeffrey participated in the Toronto Symphony Orchestra performance of Wagner's Siegfried Idyll conducted by Peter Oundjian near the end of his tenure as music director with the orchestra.

Jeffrey has continued as principal oboe with the TSO under the current directorship of Gustavo Gimeno, performing in his inaugural concert which included the Ravel Daphnis et Chloé, Suite No. 2.

On 14 March 2020, Jeffrey performed the Vaughan Williams Oboe Concerto with the Hamilton Philharmonic Orchestra conducted by music director Gemma New.

In June 2021, Jeffrey performed the Mozart Oboe Concerto with the Toronto Symphony Orchestra.

On 26, 27, 29, 30 March 2025, Jeffrey performed the Mozart Quintet for Piano and Winds with pianist Angela Hewitt and principal players of the Toronto Symphony Orchestra.

On 23 November 2025, Jeffrey participated in a concert at St. John the Evangelist Church in London, Ontario, Canada with the Toronto Symphony Orchestra Chamber Soloists. She performed the Oboe Concerto in D minor, BWV 1059R by J.S. Bach and also the Concerto for Violin and Oboe in C Minor, BWV 1060R by J. S. Bach with violinist Jonathan Crow, concertmaster of the Toronto Symphony Orchestra.

== Instrument ==
Jeffrey plays oboes manufactured by the Lorée company in Paris.

== Personal ==
Sarah Jeffrey and her husband Gabriel Radford live in Toronto. They have two children, Evelyn and Aidan.
