= Ruben Aharonyan =

Armenian classical violinist (born 1947)

Ruben Aharonyan Ռուբեն Ահարոնյան
- Born: 24 May 1947 (age 79); Riga, Latvian SSR, Soviet Union
- Genres: Classical
- Occupation: Violinist
- Instrument: Violin

Ruben Mikaeli Aharonyan (Note: Armenian: Ռուբեն Միքայելի Ահարոնյան, romanized: Ṛuben Mikʻayeli Aharonyan; Latvian: Rubens Agaronjans; Russian: Рубен Микаэлович Агаронян, romanized: Ruben Mikaelovich Agaronyan; Sometimes given as Aharonian) (born 24 May 1947) is an Armenian classical violinist. Born in Riga, Latvia, He has won second prize at the Enescu Competition in Bucharest and the Tchaikovsky Competition in Moscow (1974, second prize). He is a professor at Yerevan State Conservatory and the first violinist of the Borodin Quartet since 1996.

Aharonyan studied at the Moscow State Conservatory with Yuri Yankelevich, and afterwards became a student of Leonid Kogan. In 1982 Aharonyan became the artistic director of National Chamber Orchestra of Armenia. He has toured throughout Europe, North, and South America.

== Awards ==
- People's Artist of the Armenian SSR (1980)
- State Prize of the Armenian SSR (1988)
- State Prize of Russia (2001)

== Books ==
- (in Russian) И. Л. Золотова. Рубен Агаронян. — Ереван: Советакан грох, 1989. — 148 стр.
