= Newfoundland Symphony Orchestra =

The Newfoundland Symphony Orchestra is a prominent orchestra from the Atlantic province of Newfoundland and Labrador, Canada.

== History ==
Though evidence suggests that an orchestra may have existed in St. John's as early as 1850, the St. John's Symphony Orchestra (the forerunner to what was to become the Newfoundland Symphony Orchestra) came into existence in 1962 as the brainchild of Newfoundland organist, conductor, and music educator Ignatius Rumboldt, and was established under the auspices of the Extension Service of Memorial University of Newfoundland.

Initially a 20-piece string orchestra, the ensemble's first conductor was Nigel Wilkins, followed in 1964 by the German-born pianist and pedagogue Andreas Barban. Under Barban's leadership, the orchestra was expanded to include woodwinds, brass, and percussion. Other early conductors included Stan Navratil (1968) and Ian Mennie (1969–1974). By 1970 the completely amateur orchestra rehearsed regularly and performed three concerts each year. In 1971, Peter Gardner was engaged as Resident Artist and Concertmaster. Overall, the 1970s were a time of considerable growth for the orchestra and saw the appointment of several resident musicians.

David Gray was appointed the orchestra's first full-time conductor in 1977 and the following year, the ensemble officially changed its name to the Newfoundland Symphony Orchestra (NSO). The NSO was incorporated in 1979 and in 1985 an initiative was established under Music Director, Mario Duschenes which resulted in the creation of the Atlantic String Quartet (ASQ), the Newfoundland Symphony Youth Orchestra, the Philharmonic Choir of the NSO, the NSO Sinfonia, the Newfoundland Symphony Youth Choir (now Shallaway) and the NSO Light Orchestra. Marc David, was hired in 1992 in the role of Principal Conductor, which began his 32-year relationship with the orchestra. David finished his tenure at the end of the 2024-2025 season.

In June 2025, after an 18-month search, the NSO announced the appointment of Canadian conductor Simon Rivard as Music Director, starting in the 2025-2026 season.

Currently, the NSO is a 78 member semi-professional orchestra consisting of a small core of contract musicians, fee-per-service players, university music students, and other community players. The NSO Sinfonia is a professional ensemble consisting of 16 NSO string players supplemented with other musicians as required (drawn from the NSO). The Atlantic String Quartet (ASQ) is the resident string quartet of the NSO and is composed of the NSO's Concertmaster, Principal Second Violin, Principal Viola and Principal Cellist. All three ensembles present their own series of concerts plus special events.

The Philharmonic Choir of the NSO (PCNSO) is an auditioned community choir of 86 members which was formed to support the choral activities of the NSO. Over the past twenty years, the choir has performed in more than seventy-five NSO productions ranging from Oratorio to opera in concert. The Newfoundland Symphony Youth Orchestra (NSYO) is a 63 member youth ensemble whose members range in age from 14-23. While both the PCNSO and NSYO are affiliated with the NSO, each has its own governing committee and independent artistic direction.

== Discography ==
- The Newfie Bullet (1981)

== See also ==
- List of symphony orchestras
- Canadian classical music
