= David Pomeroy =

Canadian operatic tenor (born 1973)

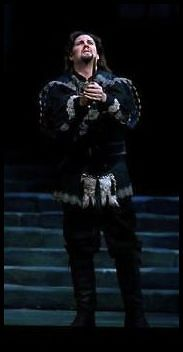

Background information
- Born: 11 September 1973 (age 52); St. John's, Newfoundland, Canada
- Genres: Opera
- Instrument: Vocals
- Years active: 1993–present
- Label: Zemsky/Green
- Website: davidpomeroy.com

David Pomeroy (born 11 September 1973) is a Canadian operatic tenor.

== Early life and musical training ==
David Pomeroy was born and raised in St. John's, Newfoundland, Canada. Pomeroy credits his grandfather, Dr. Ignatius Rumboldt (a 1975 Order of Canada recipient), Master of Choral Music, Head Organist and Director of Music for the Basilica of St. John the Baptist, as being his earliest and greatest musical influence.

Pomeroy is a graduate of Memorial University of Newfoundland, having received a Bachelor of Music (Vocal Performance). While continuing his studies at the University of Toronto, Opera Division he spent summer semesters at the Britten-Pears School in Aldeburgh, England. He later entered the Canadian Opera Company's COC Ensemble Studio – Canada's premier training program for young opera professionals.

== Performances ==
Pomeroy made his Metropolitan Opera debut in 2009, portraying the title role of Hoffmann in Les Contes d'Hoffmann opposite soprano Anna Netrebko under the baton of Maestro James Levine. He had previously sung the title role of Faust with bass James Morris in the annual "Met in the Parks" concert series.

With the Canadian Opera Company in Toronto, he has performed the title roles of Faust and Hoffmann as well as Rodolfo (La Bohème), Skuratov (From the House of the Dead) Pinkerton (Madama Butterfly) and Alfred (Die Fledermaus).

Notably, Pomeroy created the role of Stefano for the world premiere of Filumena with Calgary Opera and proceeded to perform remounts in Banff, Ottawa and Edmonton.

The 2013/2014 season consists of role debuts as Radames (Aida) as part of the Boris Brott Festival in Ontario and Wagner's Erik (Der Fliegende Hollander) with Calgary Opera as well as Don José in (Carmen), Cavaradossi (Tosca) with Vancouver Opera and Pinkerton (Madame Butterfly) with Calgary Opera. Also slated are engagements with the Newfoundland Symphony for its French Grand Opera Gala, Orchestre Trois Rivières for Verdi's Requiem and Vancouver Symphony Orchestra for Beethoven's Symphony No. 9.

Recent appearances have included Alfredo (La Traviata) with Vancouver Opera and the New York City Opera; Macduff (Macbeth) with Edmonton Opera; Don José (Carmen) with Pacific Opera Victoria, Manitoba Opera, Lyric Opera of Kansas City and Vancouver Opera, in Cork, Ireland and Staatsoper, Stuttgart; Pinkerton (Madame Butterfly) with Lyric Opera of Kansas City, Opera Theatre of Saint Louis, Fort Worth Opera, Connecticut Lyric Opera, Michigan Opera and Opéra de Québec; Cavaradossi (Tosca) with Opéra de Montréal; Il Duca (Rigoletto) with Opéra de Montréal, Calgary Opera and Manitoba Opera; Hoffmann (Les Contes d'Hoffmann) with Florida Grand Opera, COC, MET and Edmonton Opera; Ruggero (La Rondine) with Michigan Opera; Edgardo (Lucia di Lammermoor) with Calgary Opera; Romeo (Roméo et Juliette) with The Metropolitan Opera; Rodolfo (La Bohème) with Pacific Opera Victoria; Idomeneo (Idomeneo) with Pacific Opera Victoria; Pollione (Norma) with Pacific Opera Victoria; and Ladislov (The Two Widows) with Scottish Opera, performed both at the Edinburgh Festival and in Glasgow.

== Personal life ==
Pomeroy lives in St. John's, Newfoundland, with his partner Laura Ivany. The couple welcomed a daughter in the spring of 2022. Pomeroy also has a 24-year-old daughter, Juliette, who is an accomplished performer and composer.

== Discography ==
- Great Tenor Arias with the Newfoundland Symphony Orchestra, 2020
- Sam Jarvis Jr in Serinette by Harry Somers – Soundstreams Canada Centrediscs
- Enkidu in The Death of Enkidu by Harry Somers – Soundstreams Canada Centrediscs
- Henze's Venus and Adonis at the Concertgebouw in Amsterdam for Vara Radio with the Rotterdam Philharmonic.
- DVD – live opera – Stefano in world premiere of Filumena by John Estacio and John Murrell (libretto)

== Recognition and awards ==
- Winner – Edith Della Pergola National Voice competition
- Rising Artist Career Development Award – Canada Council for the Arts
