= Gert Hofbauer =

Austrian conductor and trumpeter

Gert Hofbauer (born 13 March 1937 in Knittelfeld, Styria, died 4 August 2017 in Marz) was an Austrian conductor and trumpeter.

Born in Knittelfeld, Hofbauer studied the trumpet in Graz in 1958 and in 1960 at the University of Music and Performing Arts in Vienna in Austria. He had his first engagements as a trumpet player in 1962 at the Mozarteum Orchestra of Salzburg and in 1964 in the Lower Austrian Tonkünstler Orchestra, playing the first trumpet.

During his time in the orchestras he also completed his conductor studies with Professor Richard Österreicher (1969).

In 1971 seventy-five of the best musicians from all large orchestral societies in Vienna close ranks and formed the Vienna Hofburg Orchestra under the direction of Hofbauer as conductor. Their paramount goal is to cultivate Viennese waltz and operetta music and carry it into the world.

Regional and international radio and television productions, international engagements at symphonic concerts, as well as various recordings have spread the orchestra’s fame and popularity. The Johann Strauss and Wolfgang Amadeus Mozart concerts take place from May until December every year in the Vienna Hofburg Halls.
