= Vienna Hofburg Orchestra =

- Orchestra
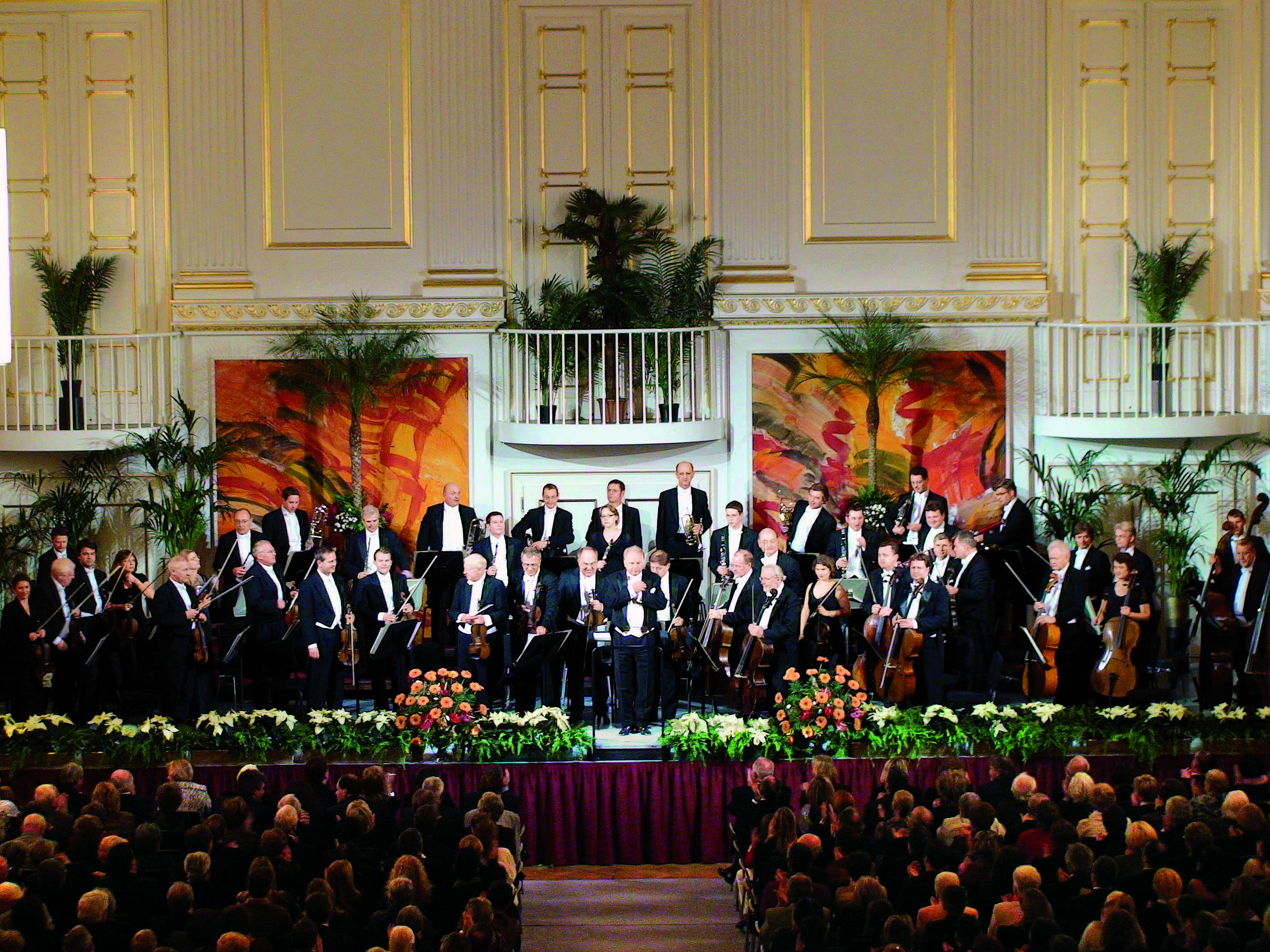
- Gert Hofbauer and the orchestra in the Grosser Redoutensaal of the Hofburg Palace, 2008.
- Founded: 1971
- Principal conductor: Giuseppe Montesano
- Website: www.hofburgorchester.at

The Vienna Hofburg Orchestra (in German: Wiener Hofburg Orchester) is an Austrian classical orchestra based in Vienna.

== History ==
The orchestra was founded by the conductor Gert Hofbauer in 1971 and consists of 52 professional musicians from all large orchestral societies of Vienna and international vocal soloists: Andrea Olah (soprano), Kayo Takemura (soprano), Ella Tyran (soprano), Elena Suvorova (mezzo-soprano), Oskar Hillebrandt (baritone), Georg Lehner (baritone), Peter Edelmann (baritone) (son of the Austrian bass Otto Edelmann) and Bohan Choe (tenor).

The orchestra's defined aim is to "cultivate Viennese waltz and operetta music", thus the orchestra's program is composed of waltz and operetta melodies by Johann Strauss, Franz Lehár and Emmerich Kalman along with opera arias and duets by Wolfgang Amadeus Mozart.

The Vienna Hofburg Orchestra's concert season lasts from May to December. The concerts are performed in the Festival Hall and the Redoutensäle of Vienna's Hofburg Imperial Palace, further the Wiener Konzerthaus and the Wiener Musikverein.

Each year on the evenings of December 31 and January 1 the Vienna Hofburg Orchestra performs traditional Viennese New Year's Eve and New Year's Concerts in the Hofburg's festival halls.

== Gallery ==
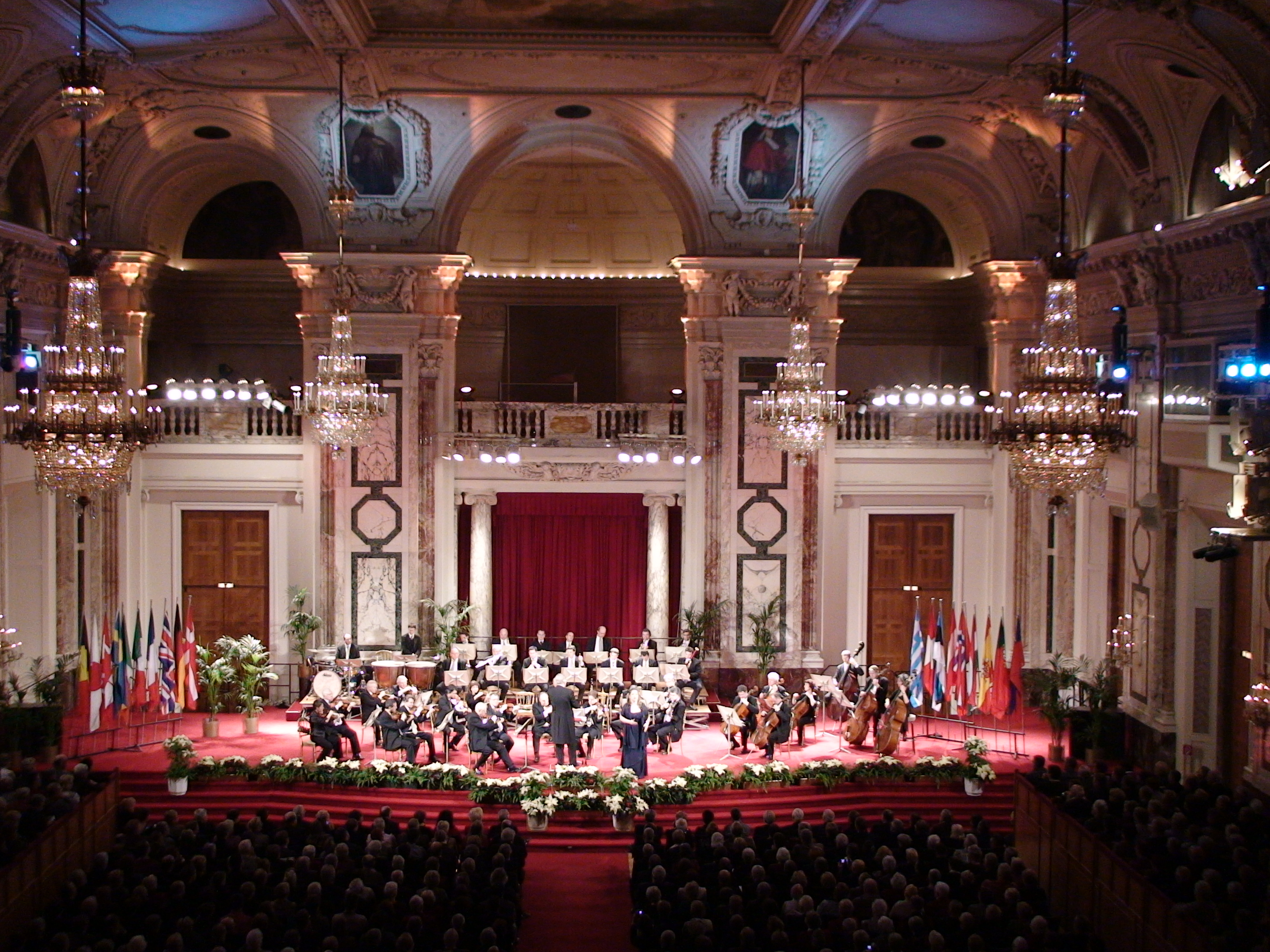
Concert in the Festsaal of Hofburg Palace (2007).

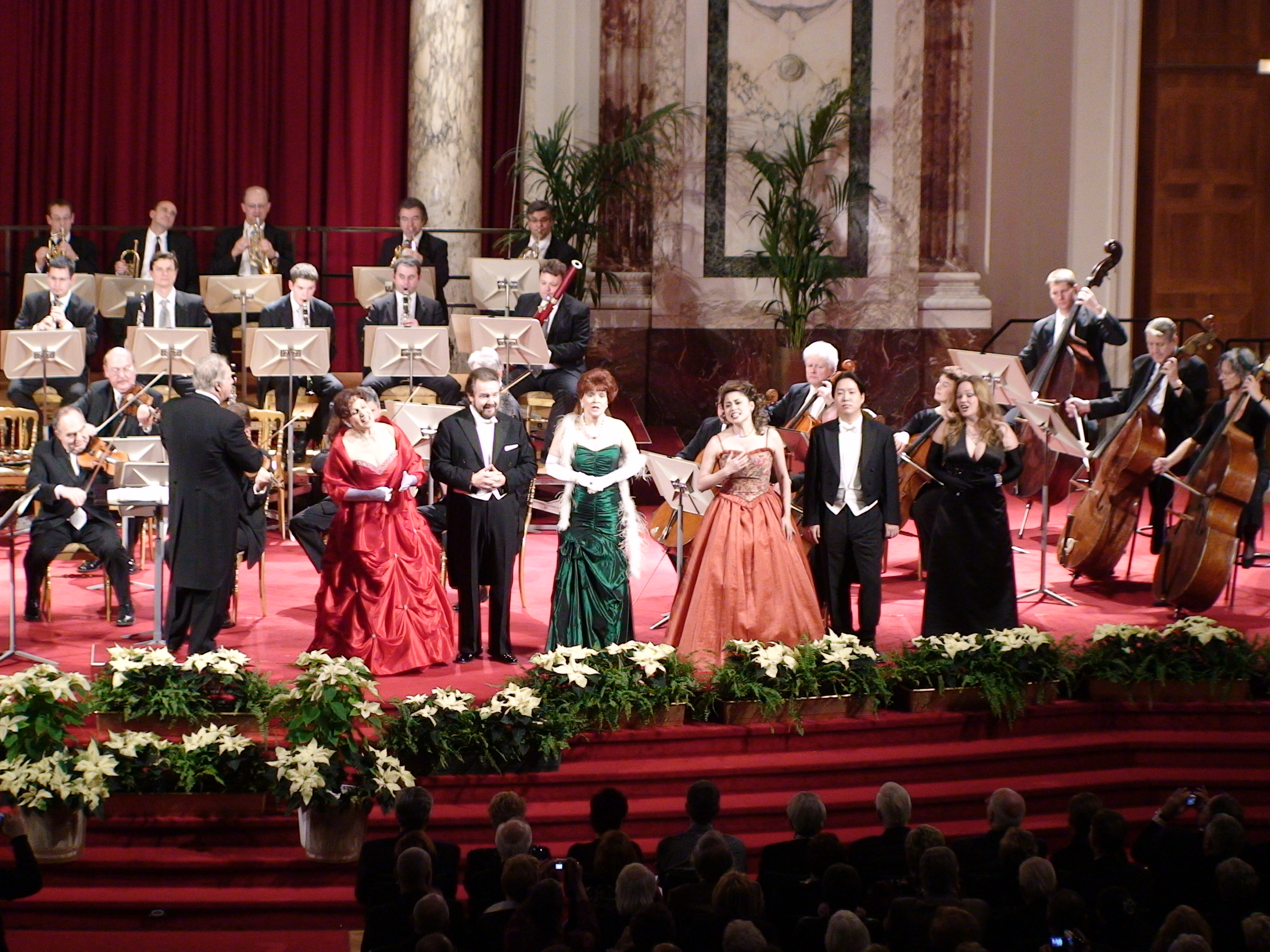
The vocal soloists of the Hofburg Orchestra (2007).

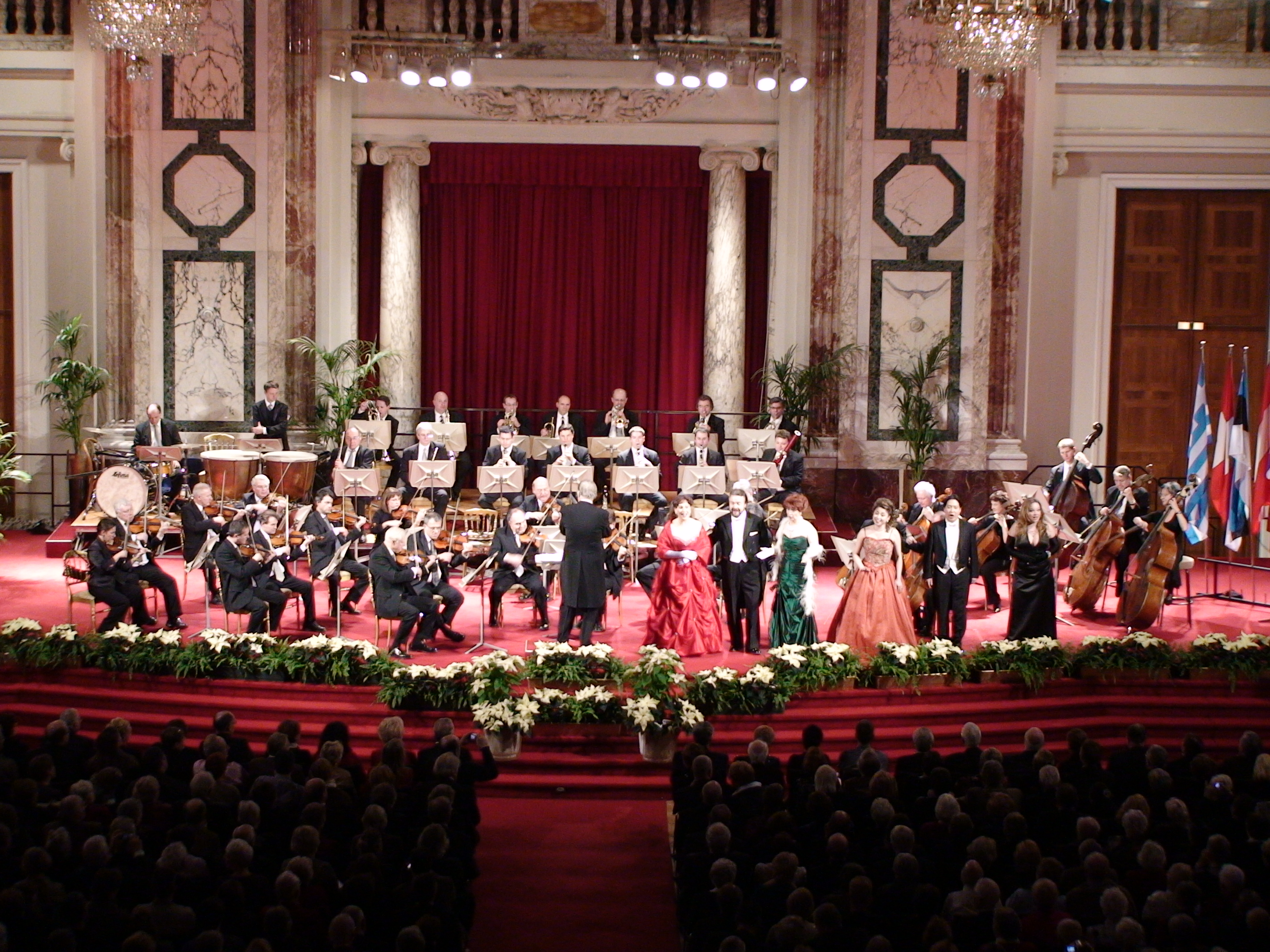
The entire ensemble in the Festsaal of Hofburg Palace (2007).

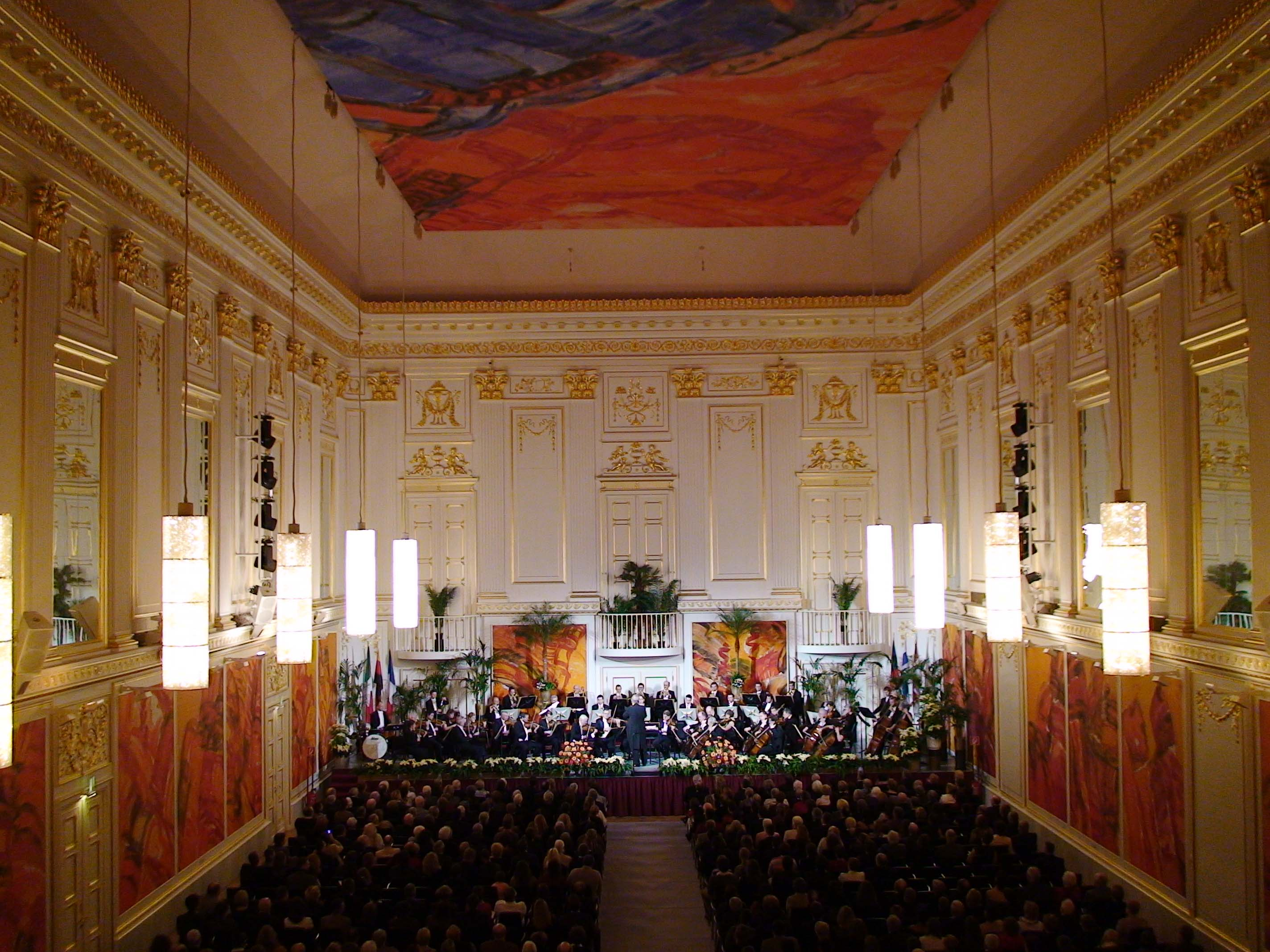
Concert in the Grosser Redoutensaal of the Hofburg Palace(2008).

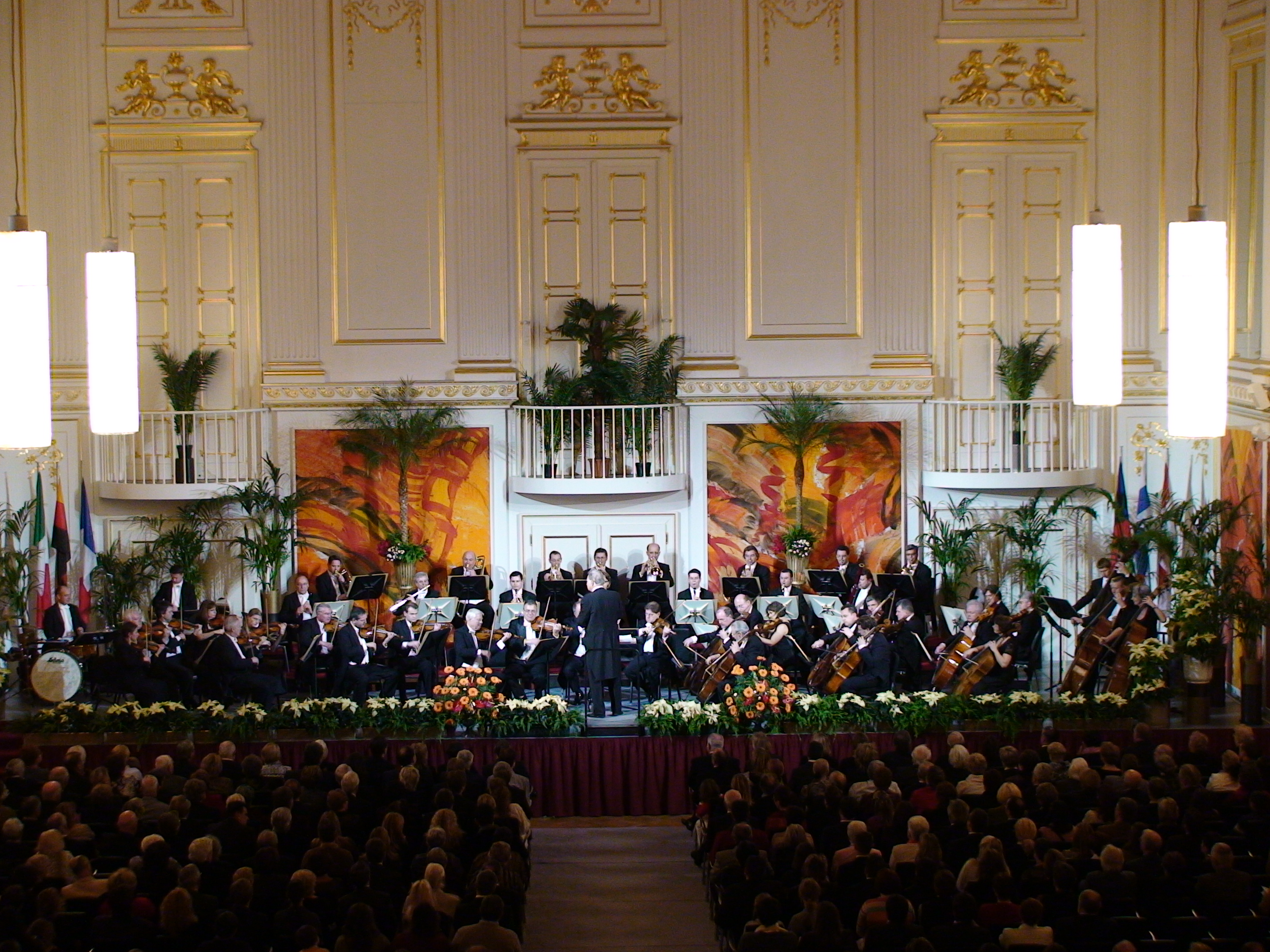
The ensemble in the Großer Redoutensaal (2008).
