= Simon Rivard =

Simon Rivard is a Canadian conductor, and current music director of the Newfoundland Symphony Orchestra.

== Life and Education ==
Rivard was born in Montréal, Québec. He studied both violin performance and orchestral conducting at the Conservatoire de musique de Montréal and then McGill University. He studied with Raffi Armenian and Alexis Hauser.

In 2018, he was invited to the first Conducting Mentorship Program at the Verbier Festival Academy, where he worked with Gianandra Noseda, Sir Simon Rattle, Gábor Takács-Nagy, Marc Minkowski, and Valery Gergiev, among others. He was subsequently re-invited to work with the Verbier Festival Junior Orchestra in 2022.

He is an alumnus of Barbara Hannigan's Equilibrium Young Artists, a mentorship program for early-career professionals.

== Career ==
From 2018 to 2022, Simon served as the Toronto Symphony Orchestra's Resident Conductor. During this time, he was mentored by Gustavo Gimeno and Sir Andrew Davis. Concurrently, he was the principal conductor of the Toronto Symphony Youth Orchestra, where his contract was extended through to 2024.

He has also held positions with the Thunder Bay Symphony Orchestra (Resident Conductor, 2017–2018), the Toronto Mendelssohn Choir (Associate Conductor, 2020–2022), and Orchestre de la Francophonie as their interim music director in both the summers of 2017 and 2024.

In 2023, Rivard was appointed Edmonton Opera's Music Director, the first in the company's history. With EO, he has conducted Puccini'sTosca and La bohème, Strauss' Die Fledermaus, Bizet's Carmen, Mozart's Don Giovanni, and the Jonathan Dove reductions of both Wagner's Das Rheingold and Siegfried. He also served as the music director on their presentation of Bartók's Bluebeard's Castle, in an English translation by British director Daisy Evans.

As a guest conductor, he has appeared on the podium across Canada, including with Orchestre symphonique de Montréal, Toronto Summer Music Festival, Symphony Nova Scotia, Orchestre symphonique de Laval, Orchestre symphonique de Québec, Orchestre Métropolitain, and Orchestre classique de Montréal. Upcoming, he debuts with the National Arts Centre Orchestra in Ottawa, ON, and made his podium debut with Opéra de Montréal in 2024 with Puccini's La bohème.

In Europe, he has appeared with Sweden's Göteborgs Symfoniker, the Verbier Festival Chamber Orchestra, and most recently, the Lapland Chamber Orchestra.

After an 18-month search, the Newfoundland Symphony Orchestra appointed Rivard as their new music director, beginning in the 2025–2026 season.

Beginning in the 2025–2026 academic year, he began teaching orchestral conducting at Conservatoire de Musique de Montréal.
