= Terry Lowry =

American composer, pianist and conductor (born 1974)

- Born: January 17, 1974 (age 52)
- Origin: Albany, Georgia
- Occupations: Composer, Pianist, Conductor
- Spouse: Tara (m.2012)
- Website: mycarrollsymphony.com

Terry Lowry (born January 17, 1974) is an American composer, conductor and pianist. He is the Conductor and Music Director of the Carroll Symphony Orchestra. His compositions include symphonies, concertos, oratorios, works for chamber ensembles and soloists, choral works and along with Dennis Blackmon, composed the musical Montgomery, based on the life of Martin Luther King Jr.

== Early life ==
Lowry was born in Albany, Georgia, and spent his childhood in the neighboring town of Adel. His father, a concert pianist and himself a Steinway Artist, served at various churches throughout Georgia as Director of Music, and the son spent much of his youth helping his father. His maternal grandmother was a church organist and had a great influence on her grandson, as well. Lowry began piano studies with his father. He was later taught by Cathy Horne, his elementary school music teacher and then by Janet Robinson at Valdosta State University. At 17, Lowry left home for Shorter College where he studied piano with William Knight and composition with Peter DeWitt. After graduating with a degree in piano performance, he earned a Master’s degree from the University of Alabama where he studied with Marvin Johnson, Craig First and Amanda Penick.

== Career ==
While an undergraduate student at Shorter, Lowry was invited by Steinway and Sons to become a Steinway Artist. This opened doors to a concert career during which Lowry has presented over 1000 piano recitals in North America and Europe.

In 1999 Lowry founded the Etowah Chamber Orchestra in Cartersville, and in 2001, Lowry moved to Carrollton, Georgia, to found the Carroll Symphony Orchestra, which he continues to serve as Conductor and Music Director. With the Carroll Symphony Orchestra, Lowry has conducted the premieres of over 250 works composed for the CSO. As Conductor of the CSO, his responsibilities include conducting the Carrollton Wind Ensemble, the Carrollton Jazz Orchestra and the Carrollton Youth String Orchestra. He is also the Music Director of the Catholic Shrine of the Immaculate Conception (Atlanta) and is the pianist for the chamber ensemble Atlanta by Six. Lowry’s compositions span the traditional concert genres of symphony, concerto, oratorio, as well as numerous chamber, choral and solo instrumental works. In 2019 he was selected the Commissioned Composer of the Year by the Georgia Music Teachers Association.

=== Musical Overture ===
In 2012, Lowry, along with co-founder Steve Gradick, founded Musical Overture, an online networking site for musicians. In 2020 the company released GigRoom, an audio/video conferencing application with near-zero latency, allowing musicians to make music together in real-time. During the COVID-19 pandemic, GigRoom allowed many musicians to teach, rehearse and perform while under lock-down requirements.

=== Hear Us ===
In 2017, using a beta version of GigRoom, Lowry’s production company, Hold the Frog Productions, presented the world’s first E-concert featuring violinist Clarissa Bevilacqua, pianist Rada Hanana and cellist Daniel Kaler. This event was documented in the film Hear Us, of which Lowry was Executive Director.

== Compositions ==
=== For Orchestra ===
- Mt. Rainier Overture Op. 6
- Second Thoughts on Variations XIV by John Maraitis Op. 7 no. 2
- The Second Coming (bass baritone solo, choir and orchestra) Op. 8
- Piano Concerto no. 1 (Master’s Thesis) Op. 22
- Poem for E-flat Trumpet and Orchestra Op. 28
- A Dream for A Sad Lady (soprano and string orchestra) Op. 37
- Piano Concerto no. 2 Op. 40
- Piano Concerto no. 3 Op. 43
- Piano Concerto no. 4 (Ballet: Seasons) Op. 59
- Confessions (A Symphony), Op. 62
- Fanfare for Someday, Op. 67
- Still (piano and orchestra), Op. 68
- Symphony no. 2, Op. 70
- Symphony no. 3, Op. 71

=== For Solo Instrument ===
- Fantasia in C minor (solo piano) Op. 1
- Arabesque (solo piano) Op. 2
- Nocturne in D-flat major (solo piano) Op. 3
- Thoughts on Variations XIv by John Maraitis (prepared piano) Op. 7 no. 1
- Rondo for solo Flute Op. 11
- Etude for solo Trumpet Op. 12
- Poem for solo Cello Op. 15
- Poem for solo Piano Op. 19
- Poem for Timpani Op. 27
- Poem for solo Piano Op. 34
- Lament (solo organ) Op. 38
- Asleep (solo piano) Op. 45
- Improvisations on a Theme by Alex North, Op. 49
- Stations of the Cross, Op. 50
- Psalmoi (seven movements for solo piano) Op. 53
- First Date (solo piano) Op. 58
- Cello Sonata (cello and piano), Op. 63
- Variations on Goldberg, piano Op. 65
- Sonatina Magdalena, soprano recorder Op. 66
- Sonata for piano, Op. 69

=== Chamber Music ===
- The Samurai (duet for piano, four hands) Op. 4 no. 1
- Piece for Percussion Ensemble Op. 4 no. 2
- Suite for Brass Quintet and Percussion Op. 5
- String Quartet no. 1 Op. 9
- String Quartet no. 2 Op. 10
- String Quartet no. 3 Op. 13
- Sextet for Piccolo, Flute, Oboe, Clarinet, Bass Clarinet and Bassoon Op. 14
- Trio for Trumpet, Timpani and Piano Op. 18
- Contemplation (tuba quartet) Op. 20
- Trio for Clarinet, Violin and Cello Op. 33
- Sea Birth, Recorder and Harpsichord Op. 55
- 6 X 6, six compositions for piano, violin, viola, cello, bass and percussion Op. 56
- Getting Away With It (concerto for piano and jazz band), Op. 64

=== Choral Music ===
- Kyrie Op. 23
- Libera Me Op. 24
- The Lord Is In His Holy Temple Op. 29 no. 1
- Surely the Lord Is In This Place Op. 29 no. 2
- Cantata no. 1 Op. 30
- Motet: Psalm 96 Op. 31
- Psalm 62:58 Op. 32
- Holy, Holy, Holy, Lord God Almighty Op. 35
- Oratorio: The Announcements Op. 36
- They That Wait Op. 39
- Crucifixus Op. 41 no. 1
- The Creation Op. 41 no. 2
- Cantata no. 2 Op. 42
- Jephthah (Soprano and Bass soloists, Double Choir and Organ) Op. 44
- Service of Evensong Op. 46
- O Mistress Mine Op. 47 (children’s chorus and piano)
- The Riddle, Op. 49b (bass soloist, chorus and piano)
- Cantata no. 3, Op. 51 (Great Is Thy Faithfulness)
- A Service of Lessons and Carols, Op. 52
- Land of Rest, Op. 54
- St. Timothy’s Psalter, Op. 57
- Scenes from the Nativity for choir, bass and soprano soloists and chamber orchestra (violin, viola, cello, bass, percussion, piano), Op. 60

=== Vocal Solo with Piano ===
- White Rose (song cycle for bass baritone and piano) Op. 21
- A Riddle (bass and piano) Op. 49a
- The Lorelei, Op. 61

=== Computer Music ===
- Piece in C(Sound) Op. 16
- Elegy for the Victims of the Oklahoma City Bombing (C-Sound) Op. 17

=== Handbell Choir ===
- Introit Op. 26

=== Stage works ===
- Montgomery (musical)

=== Discography ===
- Stations of the Cross, and other works for solo piano
- Eanes and Lowry perform Beethoven (opp. 23, 27 no 2, 57, 77)
- Da capo (piano solo)
- Franz Liszt Sonata in B minor and other works for piano
- Hammerklavier (Beethoven, op. 106)
- O Be Joyful (conducting the Choir of First Baptist Church, Carrollton, Georgia)
- O For A Thousand Tongues (conducting the Choir of First Baptist Church, Carrollton, Georgia)
- Sing Me A Love Song (conducting the Choir of First Baptist Church, Carrollton, Georgia)
- Evensong (conducting the Choir of First Baptist Church, Carrollton, Georgia)
- Hanging of the Green (conducting the Choir of First Baptist Church, Carrollton, Georgia)
- To Everything There Is A Season (conducting the Choir of First Baptist Church, Carrollton, Georgia)
