= Miguel Salmon Del Real =

Mexican orchestra conductor (born 1978)

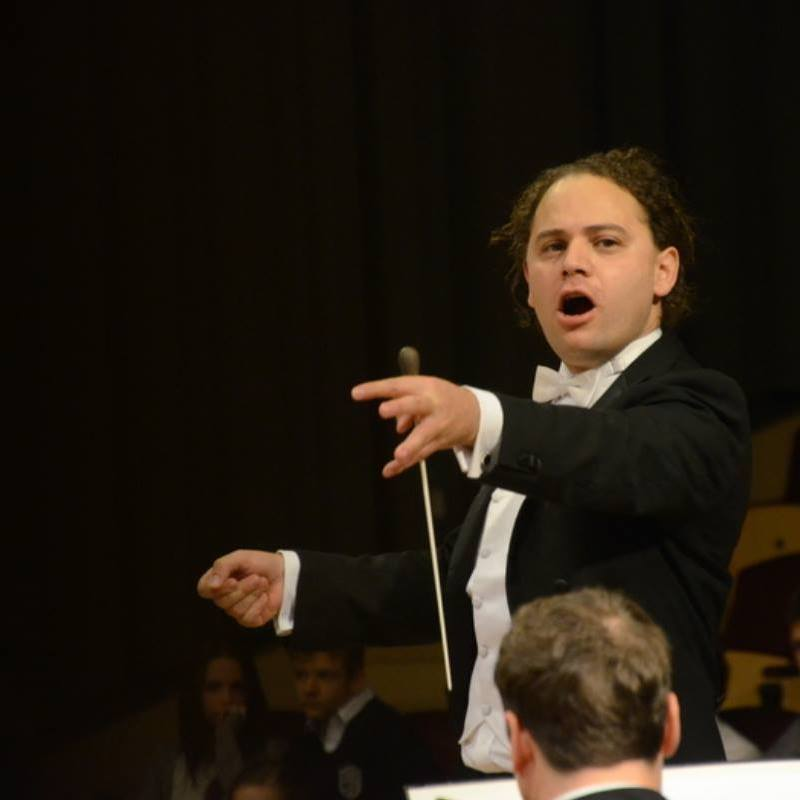
- Real in 2015

Background information
- Born: Miguel Ángel Salmon Del Real; 1978 (age 47–48); Mexico City, Mexico
- Genres: Classical
- Occupation: Conductor
- Years active: 1999-present
- Website: http://www.miguelsalmondelreal.com

Miguel Salmon Del Real (born 1978, Mexico City) is a Mexican orchestra conductor. Having performed the world premiere of nearly 100 pieces written by living composers around the globe, he has conducted orchestras, choirs and ensembles.

== Early life ==
Miguel is the son of an industrial engineer and a psychologist who studied piano and singing respectively.

== Professional career ==
=== Studies and career in Europe ===
He began his formal studies at the School of Sacred Music of Mexico Cardinal Miranda Institute in 1996, where he learned with Professor Xavier Gonzalez ("Father Xavier"), choral conducting, piano, musicology, orchestral conducting, composition with Juan Trigos and Victor Rasgado, piano with Gustavo Morales and languages. He also took polyphonic workshop Humberto Hernandez Medrano studies and various humanities courses with Ernesto de la Peña.

In 2002, he was invited as a student in France and in 2005 the Royal Conservatory of The Hague, Netherlands, and awarded a bachelor's degree in Music Composition (Ayres, Barlow, van Bergeijk and Wagennar). There he founded the Nederlandse Nieuwe Muziek Groep in 2003 and settled for additional psychoacoustics algorithmic composition studies (with Paul Berg) and (with Bert Kraaipoel) in the annual Sonology course of the Conservatory.

Eventually, he was invited by Pierre Boulez in 2005 and again by Peter Eötvös in 2007, to actively participate in Conducting Master's Courses at the Academy of Lucerne Festival where he conducted some of the greatest orchestral works of the Twentieth Century, as Amériques by Edgard Varèse, and Gruppen by Karlheinz Stockhausen, thus becoming the first young conductor to be selected twice to participate in such courses.

In 2009, he received a master's degree in orchestral conducting at the Amsterdam Conservatory (having Lucas Vis as tutor, who was assistant to Bruno Maderna, student of Hermann Scherchen). His thesis for this degree was entitled "A review of old ideas, new innovations in classic music composition along time. Julian Carrillo and his mind", based on a comprehensive study of writings and works of the composer.

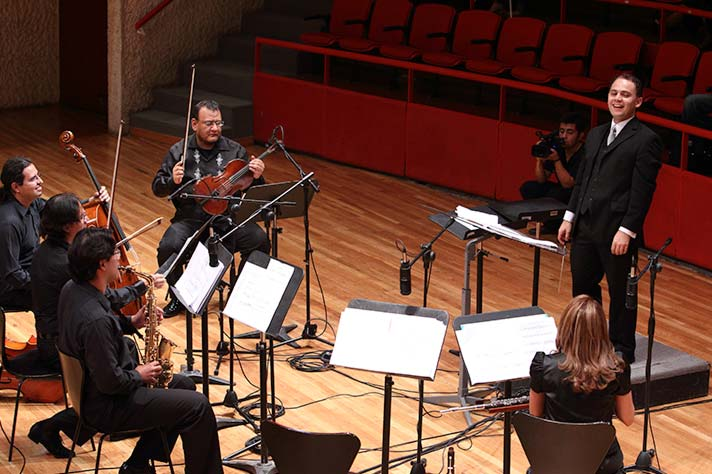
Ensamble Nuevo de México, 2009.

=== New Ensemble of Mexico ===
On his return from Europe in 2009, he founded the Ensamble Nuevo de México (New Ensemble of Mexico), where for three years he made over 50 premieres of Mexican composers. With this group he made a "sonorous encyclopaedia" with more than 20 symphonic miniatures, all of one minute, commissioned to diverse generations of Mexican composers.

Since November 2009, the Ensemble New Mexico has given world premiere to 48 works from 39 composers. These pieces, written exclusively for the Ensemble New Mexico have been the result of the collaboration between creators and performers.

Comprised by soloists, chamber musicians and regular core members from diverse Symphony Orchestras in the country, the Ensamble Nuevo de México seeks to commission and premiere works by living authors, with the objective of constructing a new and innovative repertoire.

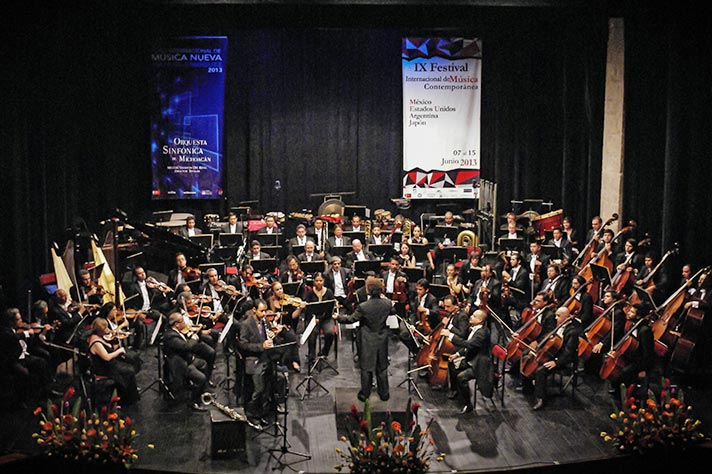
Concert at the International Forum of New Music ‘Manuel Enríquez', 2010.

=== International Forum of New Music "Manuel Enríquez" and teaching experience ===
In 2010, he was Coordinator of Programming for the International Forum of New Music "Manuel Enríquez" (2010 and 2011), an event sponsored by the INBA (Fine Arts National Institute), as well as professor (Orchestration, Fuga, music theory and orchestral practices and corals) in institutions such as the ICEM (Research Center and Music Studies), ITESM (Monterrey Institute of Technology and Higher Education), Mexico City Campus. He also took part as a teacher in the Research and Musical Information Centre "Carlos Chavez" and the UAM (Metropolitan Autonomous University).

==== Teaching ====
- 2011-2012: Instituto Tecnológico de Estudios Superiores de Monterrey (ITESM) / Mexico City
- 2010-2012: Centro de Investigación y Estudios de la Música (CIEM) / Mexico City
- 2009-2011: Escuela Superior de Música (ESM, INBA) / Mexico City

==== Lectures ====
- 2015: 13 unknown ideas from and about Julián Carrillo / Fine Art Palace, Mexico city
- 2014: 13 unknown ideas from and about Julián Carrillo / Conservatorio de las Rosas, Morelia
- 2013: Today ́s Mexico composers. A panorama. / Metropolitan Autonomous University (UAM), Mexico City
- 2012: Music, as a social catalyst / Metropolitan Autonomous University (UAM), Mexico City
- 2011: Julián Carrillo: A new compendium of ideas / CENIDIM, Mexico City

=== His teachers ===
He has studied with various teachers in Europe, as Reinbert de Leeuw 2003, Ed Spanjaard 2004-2007, and Arie van Beek (2007) Dutch; Hungarian Peter Eötvös (2005–2007), Zsolt Nagy (Conservatoire de Paris, 2006–2007) and István Parkai (2007) and Frenchman Pierre André Valade (2007) and Finland's Jorma Panula (in Mexico in 2009).

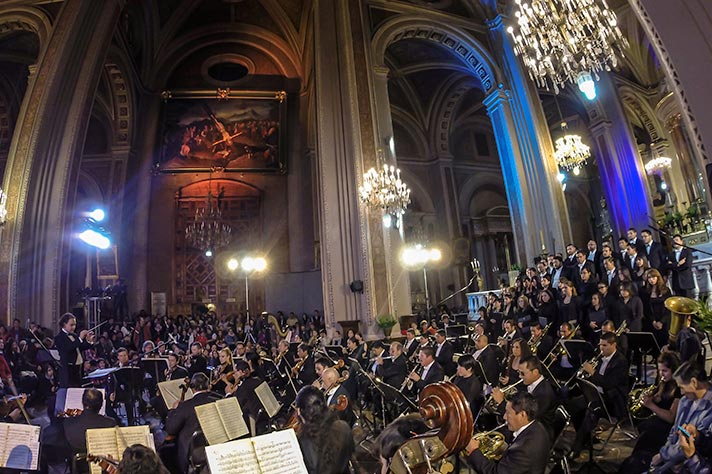
Symphonic concert at Morelia's Cathedral, OSIDEM (Symphony Orchestra of Michoacan), 2012.

== Michoacan Symphony Orchestra ==
After winning the first Competition for Mexican Conductors 2012 of the Symphony Orchestra of Arts Sinaloa, he served as director of the OSIDEM (Symphony Orchestra of Michoacán) from August 2012 to October 2015, appointed as well, by national competition.

During this period the Michoacán Symphony Orchestra offered 113 symphonic concerts in 19 cities, receiving nearly one hundred thousand people and premiering 34 works and 11 in Mexico, besides rescuing traditional and contemporary pieces of the national repertoire such as the symphonic poem "Diluvio de Fuego" (Flood of Fire) from Paulino Paredes (1913–1957) born in Michoacán.

The orchestra received 121 soloists and 21 directors, all of them from 17 countries.

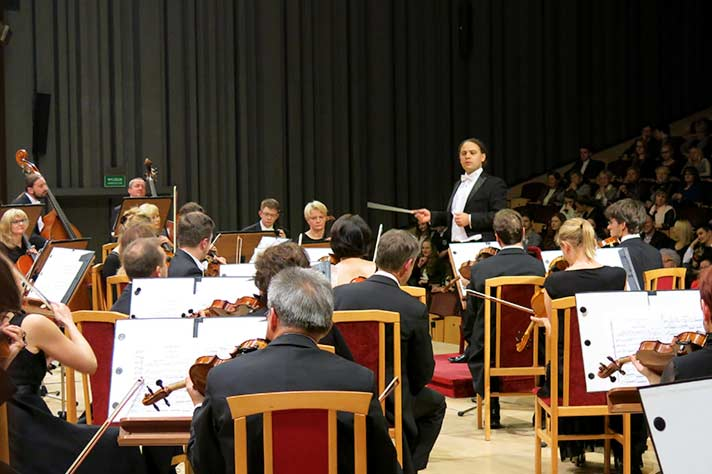
Filharmonia Kaliska, Poland, 2015.

== Late projects ==
Following his visit in 2014 as guest director of diverse orchestras in Russia, Poland, Portugal and Germany, Salmon Del Real was invited to conduct the Philharmonic Orchestra of Kalisz, Poland, in October 2015, where he presented two works by Mexican authors: the "Second Symphony" by Carlos Chavez (1899–1978), and "Sensemayá" by Silvestre Revueltas (1899–1940), along with the Overture-Fantasy "Romeo and Juliet" by Pyotr Ilyich Tchaikovsky (1840–1893); "Peer Gynt Suite No. 1" by Edvard Grieg (1843–1907), and "Finland" on the occasion of the bicentennial of Jean Sibelius (1865–1957).

On February 5, 2016, he conducted the Warmia and Mazury Philharmonic Orchestra in Olsztyn, Poland, where he presented music of Tchaikovsky and Revueltas, and on March 4, at Xalapa, Veracruz where he conducted diverse symphonies at Centro Cultural Tlaqná, with pieces of Aldemaro Romero, Astor Piazzola, Ricardo Castro, José Pablo Moncayo and others.

=== Positions ===
- 2012-2015: Michoacán Symphony Orchestra / Chief conductor
- From 2009: Ensamble Nuevo de México / Founder and chief conductor
- 2009-2011: Orquesta Sinfónica de la Escuela Superior de Música / Assistant conductor
- 2002-2005: Nederlandse Nieuwe Muziek Groep / Founder and chief conductor

== As guest conductor ==
In the past he has also conducted the following orchestras and philharmonics:

In Europe:

- Warmia and Mazury Philharmonic Orchestra (Poland, 2016)
- Kalisz Philharmonic (Poland, 2015)
- Trier Philharmonic (Germany, 2014)
- Voronezh Symphony Orchestra (Russia, 2014)
- Opole Philharmonic (Poland, 2014)
- Gaia Philharmonic (Portugal, 2014)
- Janáček Philharmonic Ostrava (Czech Republic, 2007)
- l'Orchestre d'Auvergne (France, 2007)
- l'Orchestre et Choeur du Conservatoire de Paris (France, 2007 and 2008)
- Circuit Court Ensemble (France 2007)
- London Steve Reich Ensemble (UK 2006)
- Cosmopolitano Ensemble (Germany, 2003)
- Nieuwe Nederlandse Muziek Groep (Netherlands, 2003–2006)

In Mexico:

- Xalapa Symphony Orchestra (2016)
- Camerata of Coahuila (2015)
- School Orchestra Carlos Chavez (2014)
- Symphony Orchestra of San Luis Potosí (2013)
- Orchestra of the University of Guanajuato (2013 and 2015)
- Carlos Chavez Youth Orchestra (2012 and 2013)
- Sinaloa Symphony Orchestra of Arts (2012 and 2014)
- Jalisco Philharmonic Orchestra (2012, 2014 and 2015)
- Coyoacan Symphony Orchestra (2010 and 2011)
- Puebla Symphony Orchestra (2010 and 2011)
- Zacatecas Youth Orchestra (2009 and 2009)
- Symphony Orchestra of the School of Music (several concerts between 2009 and 2011)
- Sonora Philharmonic Orchestra (2009)
- Orchestra of the University of Hidalgo (2007, 2009 and 2012)
