= Rosemary Thomson =

Canadian conductor and chorus master

Rosemary Thomson is a Canadian conductor and chorus master. As of 2018, she is the music director of the Okanagan Symphony Orchestra, chorus master of the Calgary Philharmonic, and assistant conductor for the Canadian Opera Company.

== Early life and education ==
Thomson was born in St. Catharines, Ontario. She received a Bachelor of Music degree (piano) from the University of Toronto and is also a graduate of their Advanced Graduate Conducting Program.

== Career ==
From 1994 to 1996 Thomson was the conductor for the Dundas Valley Orchestra in Hamilton, Ontario. In 1997 and 1998 she worked as a resident conductor for the Winnipeg Symphony Orchestra. Thomson was hired as resident conductor of the Calgary Philharmonic orchestra for three seasons, beginning in 2001. In 2006 she was a guest conductor for the Toronto Symphony Youth Orchestra.

She served as principal conductor of the Okanagan Symphony orchestra from 2006 until 2023. She is now Conductor Emerita.

In 2008 Thomson was a guest conductor with the Vancouver Symphony Orchestra. In 2011 she was chorus master of the Calgary Philharmonic and assistant conductor for the Canadian Opera Company.

In 2015 she conducted the Vancouver Opera Orchestra for the UBC Opera Ensemble's production of Manon, and in 2018 Thomson conducted the orchestra for Opera Nuova's farcical production The Arctic Flute in Edmonton.

Thomson currently serves as the artistic director for Opera Kelowna.

== Awards ==
- London Music Foundation Rosie Robinow Prize for promising pianist (1986)
- Sir Ernest MacMillan Memorial Foundation Award for Orchestral Conductors (1998)
