= South Czech Philharmonic =

The South Czech Philharmonic (formerly known as South Bohemian Chamber Philharmonic or Chamber Philharmonic Orchestra of South Bohemia), based in České Budějovice, was founded in 1981; its original name was The South Bohemian State Orchestra. At present, it consists of 37 artists and remains the only professional philharmonic orchestra in the region of South Bohemia.

Origins of the orchestra are associated with a Czech conductor Jaroslav Vodňanský; subsequently, the position of Chief Conductor was held by Ondřej Kukal, Břetislav Novotný, Jaroslav Křeček and Stanislav Vavřínek. The current Chief Conductor, Jan Talich, has been leading the orchestra since 2008.

Besides interpreting the music of classical composers and pieces appropriate for chambre orchestras and smaller concert halls, the Philharmonic is dedicating increasing attention to the contemporary trend of interlinking genres and discovering new perspectives of both interpretation and presentation of music.
