= KOHAR Symphony Orchestra and Choir =

Background information
- Also known as: KOHAR All Time Armenian Favorites
- Origin: Gyumri, Armenia
- Genres: Traditional music of Armenia, Symphonic Jazz, Classical
- Years active: 1997–2019
- Label: HAYASA Productions LTD
- Website: koharconcert.com

The KOHAR Symphony Orchestra and Choir (also known as KOHAR) is a symphony orchestra and chorus based in Gyumri, Armenia.

== History ==
KOHAR was founded in 1997 as an independent musical and cultural institution by the Armenian culture patron, Harout Khatchadourian of Lebanon. Alongside his brothers, Shahe and Nar Khatchadourian, Khatchadourian sustained the activities of KOHAR and its concerts in memory of their late father, Aram, and named the orchestra to honor their mother 'Kohar'.

KOHAR initially started as a symphony orchestra in the year 2000, playing the music of Armenia, and other popular songs and well-known symphonies, under the helm of Creative Director and Conductor Sebouh Abcarian of Cyprus. Later, the KOHAR Choir was formed to complement the work of the KOHAR Symphony Orchestra.

KOHAR consisted of over 150 musicians and 12 solo singers, along with a 15-member dance ensemble. The Symphony Orchestra & Choir quickly grew in popularity with its initial outdoor concerts on the premises of KOHAR in Lebanon, which attracted interest from locals and overseas visitors.

In 2012 Natalie Galstyan was appointed assistant conductor of the orchestra, and in 2015 she was named as conductor of the KOHAR Symphony Orchestra and Choir.

== Tours ==
KOHAR's first major concert tour, All Time Armenian Favourites, took place in the summer of 2002, in Cyprus and Lebanon, spread over four days. The concerts were a popular cultural experience, drawing more than 4000 people to Beirut International Exhibition & Leisure Center. The collection of traditional and popular songs "drew many into tears of nostalgia, reminiscence and pride".

== International success ==
In October 2005, KOHAR’s All Time Armenian Favorites tour visited Istanbul. On October 9–12, 2005, the concert was held at Lutfi Kirdar Concert Hall, with an audience of more than 7,000 including Armenians, and drawing audience members from as far away as the Adana province.

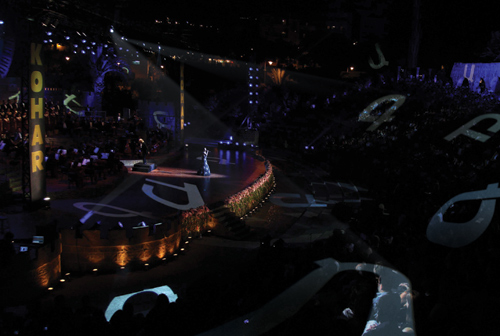
KOHAR at the Roman Amphitheater, Zouk Mikaël, Lebanon, 2010

KOHAR’s tour continued from one capital to another, on 28–29 April 2006 performing at the Grand Hall of the Kremlin, Moscow, to an Armenian, Russian and foreign audience of almost 12,000. It was an unexpected appearance by an Armenian Orchestra in Russia, and was highly successful with the Russian audience.

KOHAR made its North American debut at the end of 2007 and visited the major cities of the US and Canada. The North American Tour of KOHAR began on October 18, 2007, in Los Angeles, and moved to San Francisco, Detroit, Chicago, Boston, Toronto, and Montreal, before ending with New York’s Carnegie Hall on November 20, 2007.

KOHAR has continued touring the Middle East, commencing with the Syrian Arab Republic, and the first appearance on July 9, 2009, at The Opera Theater of Damascus, followed by successful performances on 15, 16, and 17 July 2009, within the world heritage site of the Citadel of Aleppo.

The ensemble performed in Lebanon in October 2010.

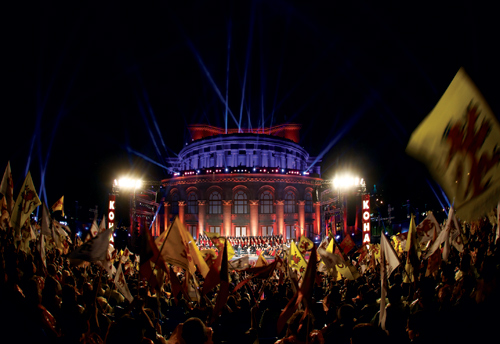
The audience of KOHAR waving the flags of the Kingdom of Cilicia, Liberty Square, Yerevan, Armenia, 2011

KOHAR showcased its largest concert with Stars of Armenia at Liberty Square near the Opera House in Yerevan, Armenia on 28 May 2011. Many popular Armenian singers performed. The live concert was broadcast live by Armenia’s Channel 1 TV and for the first time via Internet live stream. Over 10,000 spectators, in addition to tens of thousands of TV and Internet viewers from Armenia and the Diaspora, watched KOHAR's performance.

KOHAR’s latest production by HAYASA Productions LTD (Cyprus) and Domino Production (Armenia) had a superb 3D mapping and projection on the façade of the Opera House, featuring images that transposed into Armenia’s history from Noah’s Ark to its national symbol Ararad, its alphabet – the Ayp Pen Kim – and reaching the historic Armenian Kingdom of Cilicia. The culmination of the night was the performance of the song "Babenagan Guiliguia," which topped the charts in Armenia as the Number 1 song for 8 consecutive weeks. The audience joined in by waving more than 3,000 flags of the Kingdom of Cilicia that were distributed by the organizers. The audience also sang the song "Veraganknir Guiliguia," which has become KOHAR’s anthem.

KOHAR aims to revive and promulgate the Armenian alphabet and culture for to preserve Armenian heritage for future generations.

== Awards and acknowledgements ==
In 2004, KOHAR won the Intermedia Award at the World Media Festival in Hamburg, Germany.

In 2005, it also won the Anoush Achievement Award at the Seventh Annual Armenian Music Awards, held at the Hollywood Palladium, California.

Patron of Armenian culture Harout Khatchadourian of Lebanon was awarded at the presidential palace with the "Movses Khorenatsi" medal by President Serzh Sargsyan of Armenia on 17 September 2011 for his decades of continuous cultural contribution in different Armenian Diasporas in safeguarding and promulgating Armenian music, song, and culture in the Armenian alphabet.
