= Aram Gharabekian =

Armenian musician (1955–2014)

Aram Gharabekian Արամ Ղարաբեկյան
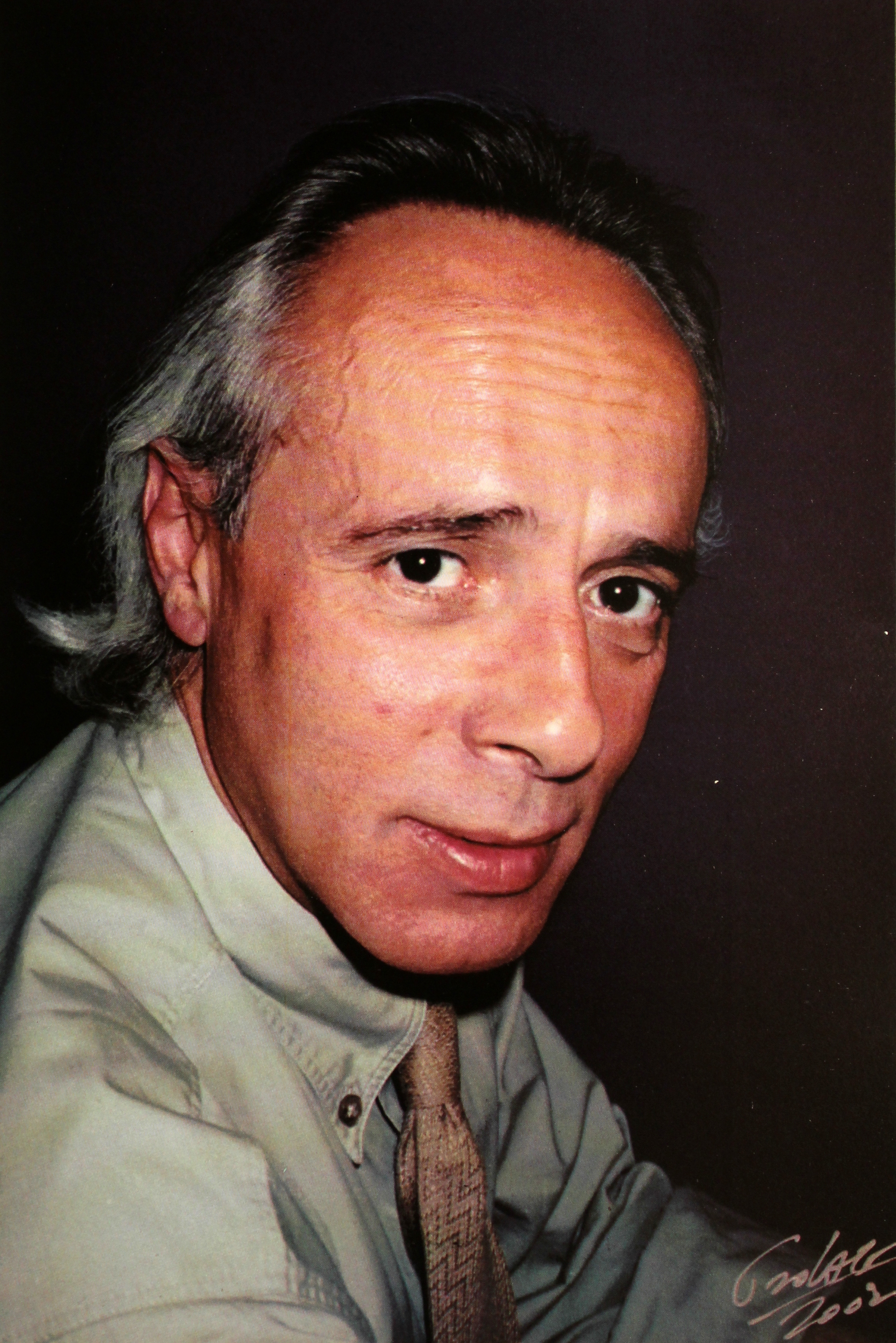

Background information
- Born: 4 July 1955; Tehran, Iran
- Died: 10 January 2014 (aged 58) Los Angeles, California, U.S.
- Genres: Classical
- Occupation: Conductor

Aram Vachiki Gharabekian (Note: Armenian: Արամ Վաչիկի Ղարաբեկյան, romanized: Aram Vachʻiki Gharabekyan; Western Armenian: Արամ Վաչիկի Ղարաբեկեան, romanized: Aram Vachʻigi Gharapegean; Persian: آرام قارابگیان, romanized: Ārām Qārābigyān) (4 July 1955 – 10 January 2014) was an Iranian-born Armenian conductor, former Artistic Director and Principal Conductor of the National Chamber Orchestra of Armenia. In 1983 he founded and until 1996 directed and conducted the Boston SinfoNova Orchestra.

== Biography ==
Aram Gharabekian was born into an Armenian family in Tehran, Iran, on 4 July 1955. He moved to the United States at the age of 17. He graduated from the New England Conservatory in Boston, then continued his postgraduate studies at Mainz University in Germany. He studied conducting with Franco Ferrara in Italy, and in 1979 became one of a few conducting pupils of Sergiu Celibidache in Germany. Gharabekian also studied composition and conducting under Jacob Druckman and Leonard Bernstein at Tanglewood Music Center in Massachusetts.

Gharabekian died in Los Angeles on 10 January 2014 at the age of 58.

== Awards ==
- 1989 Lucien Wulsin Performance Award
- 1988 American Society of Composers, Authors and Publishers (ASCAP) Award for Adventuresome Programming
- Harvard Musical Association's "Best Performance Award"
