= Ignatius Rumboldt =

Canadian musician (1916–1994)

Ignatius Aloysius Rumboldt C.M. (November 30, 1916 – September 9, 1994) was a choir director, organist and educator in Newfoundland.

He was born in Curling (later Corner Brook). His mother died when he was six and he was sent to Mount Cashel Orphanage. As a young musician, Rumboldt met Charles Hutton. He studied at summer schools at the Toronto Conservatory of Music, the George Little School of Music in Montreal and the Fred Waring School of Music in Pennsylvania. In 1931, Hutton offered him the job of assistant organist at the Cathedral of St. John the Baptist in St. John's. In 1936, he became organist and choirmaster at the cathedral. From 1936 to 1952, he was director of music at Saint Bonaventure's College, Holy Cross School in St. John's, St. Patrick's Hall and Mount Cashel School. From 1952 to 1960, Rumboldt was a visiting lecturer on music at Memorial University of Newfoundland. He organized the Memorial University Glee Club which performed Newfoundland folk songs. He also organized a group called the Glee Club which performed at a local television station. In 1960, he became a full-time lecturer on music at the university. Rumboldt retired in 1980. He lobbied for the creation of a department of music at the university.

From 1965 to 1968, Rumboldt was a member of the Canada Council. In 1975, he was named to the Order of Canada.

He died in St. John's at the age of 77.

A music scholarship at Memorial University is awarded in his name.

His grandson David Pomeroy is a Canadian operatic tenor.
