= National Chamber Orchestra of Armenia =

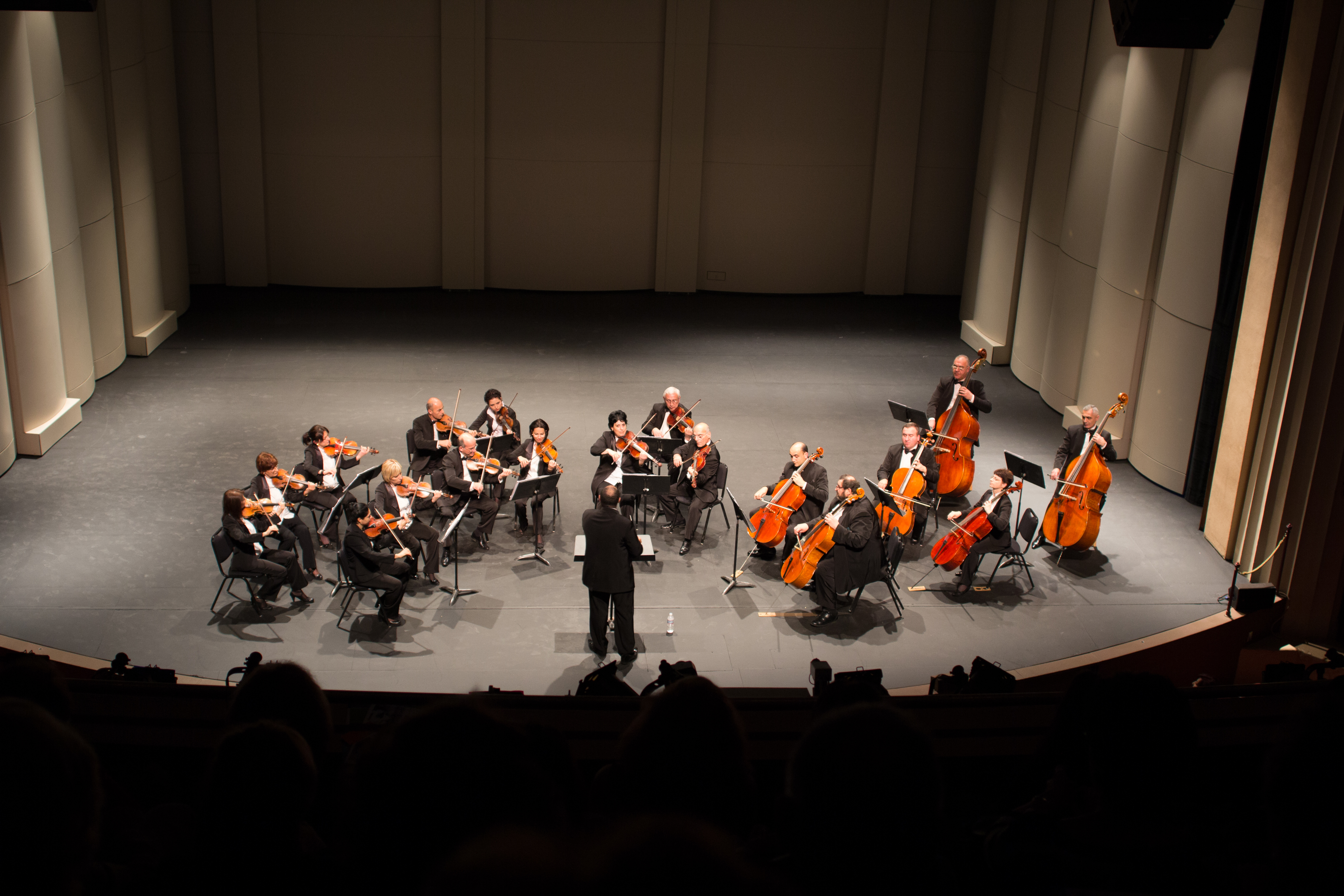
The National Chamber Orchestra of Armenia in concert at The Alex Theatre in Glendale, California in November 2013.

The origin of the National Chamber Orchestra of Armenia (NCOA) dates back to the Soviet era. It was founded by the violinist Zareh Sahakiants as the Armenian State Chamber Orchestra in 1962. In 1997 it was merged with the Yerevan Chamber Orchestra to form the new NCOA. As of September 2010 the Principal Conductor and Music Director is Vahan Mardirossian.

In April 1997, Armenia’s Ministry of Culture extended a special invitation to American-Armenian conductor Aram Gharabekian and appointed him as Artistic Director and Principal Conductor of the newly formed National Chamber Orchestra of Armenia. The twenty-five members of the NCOA exemplify the finest chamber music players in Armenia who are all graduates of the Komitas Conservatory in Yerevan.

== Events ==
The NCOA has appeared on tour with remarkable praise in the United States, Canada, United Kingdom, Germany, France, Switzerland, Greece, Russia, Georgia, Cyprus, Lebanon, and the United Arab Emirates. Gharabekian also has led the NCOA to notable performances in the Canterbury Festival in England, the Halle Festival in Germany, and the Dimitria Festival in Greece. For their outstanding achievements Aram Gharabekian and NCOA have been duly recognized in a special proclamation by the United States Congress and televised features on CNN Special and Russian Kultura TV channel.

Under the patronage of the First Ladies of Germany and Armenia, Gharabekian and NCOA officially opened the international celebrations honoring Aram Khachaturian’s 100th anniversary in Berlin, and have been honored with a special concert at the Presidential Palace in Nicosia in Cyprus. The NCOA is the only performing ensemble in Armenia that is committed to a significant outreach program, Taking Music to the People, which offers free-of-charge performances to the regions of Armenia and Nagorno Karabakh, every season. During the last decade the NCOA has commissioned and premiered more than 40 new works and encouraged the integration of traditional Armenian musical instruments such as duduk, zurna, shvi and kamancha in the works specially written for the orchestra.

== Media releases ==
Gharabekian and NCOA have recorded three CD albums of works by Armenian composers and have released two DVDs of live open-air performances by the magnificent backdrop of historic sites of Garni Temple (1st century AD) and Zvartnots Complex (7th century AD). The NCOA Gala Open-Air Concert DVD recorded live at the Garni temple in 2004 has been recognized with a special diploma at 2005 ECO-ETNO-FOLK Film Festival in Bucharest, Romania. The NCOA won the prize for the Best Classical Music Project at the annual Armenian National Music Awards in 2008 for initiating and organizing the first-ever classical music festival in Nagorno-Karabakh Republic in September 2007.

== Artistic Leadership ==
- Zareh Sahakiants Founder and Artistic Director (1962 – 1975)
- Kostandin Baghdasaryan Artistic Director (1975 – 1982)
- Ruben Aharonyan Artistic Director (1982 – 1996)
- Aram Gharabekian Artistic Director and Principal Conductor (1997 – 2010)
- Vahan Mardirossian Artistic Director and Principal Conductor (Since 2011)
