= Julian Pellicano =

American music conductor

Julian Pellicano (born March 7, 1980, in Garden City, New York), is an American conductor. He is currently the associate conductor of the Winnipeg Symphony Orchestra and principal conductor of the Royal Winnipeg Ballet in Winnipeg, Canada.

== Musical education ==
Pellicano started playing the piano at the age of 5, and percussion shortly after, at age 8. Pellicano went on to receive a double bachelor's degree, from Johns Hopkins University (philosophy) and Peabody Conservatory (percussion) where he was a student of Jonathan Haas.

Pellicano earned a graduate performance diploma from the Royal College of Music in Stockholm, Sweden, where he studied percussion under Anders Loguin, founding member of the Swedish percussion ensemble Kroumata, Roland Johansson, former timpanist of the Royal Stockholm Philharmonic, and Daniel Kåse, principal percussionist of the Royal Stockholm Philharmonic. Pelliano studied conducting with Per Andersberg.

Pellicano received his master of music in percussion and a master of music in orchestral conducting from the Yale School of Music, During his tenure at Yale, Pellicano held a fellowship in orchestral conducting and served as the assistant conductor of the Yale Philharmonia Orchestra under his principal teacher Shinik Hahm. He studied percussion with Robert van Sice and was a member of the Yale Percussion Group.

== Conducting career ==
From 2009 to 2013 Julian Pellicano was the music director of the Longy Conservatory Orchestra, at the Longy School of Music in Cambridge, Massachusetts.

Pellicano was appointed resident conductor of the Winnipeg Symphony Orchestra in 2013, and promoted to associate conductor in 2019. He also simultaneously took on the position of principal conductor with the Royal Winnipeg Ballet. Conductor of the Norfolk New Music Ensemble since 2008, he is on faculty at the Norfolk New Music Workshop and also serves as artist-in-residence at the Norfolk Chamber Music Festival.

== Awards and fellowships ==
A recipient of the 2008 Presser Music Award from the Yale School of Music. He was also awarded a fellowship from the Centre Acanthes to conduct the Orchestre Philharmonique du Luxembourg under the mentorship of Peter Eötvös and Zsolt Nagy, and was selected by Kurt Masur to participate in the 2009 Kurt Masur Conducting Seminar. Pellicano is also a recipient of Yale's Phillip F. Nelson Award.
