= Kindred Spirits Orchestra =

Canadian community orchestra

- Orchestra
- Founded: 2009
- Location: Markham, Ontario
- Music director: Kristian Alexander
- Website: ksorchestra.ca

The Kindred Spirits Orchestra (KSO) is a civic orchestra based in Markham, Ontario, Canada. It was founded in 2009 with music director Kristian Alexander.

== Orchestra ==
The KSO is an auditioned-based civic orchestra based in Markham, Ontario, Canada. It performs regularly at the Flato Markham Theatre, the Richmond Hill Centre for the Performing Arts, and the CBC Glenn Gould Studio in Toronto.

Music director Kristian Alexander first discussed creating an orchestra in Markham in 2007. Auditions began in April 2009 with rehearsals in September and the orchestra's first concert was performed at Glenn Gould Studio on 3 November 2009. In its early years, the KSO had 38 musicians and focussed on presenting Baroque and classical repertoire. Since then, it has grown to 86 musicians required for more complex and large-scales compositions. The KSO has commissioned original pieces and has performed works of Canadian composers Brian Current, Gary Kulesha and Larysa Kuzmenko.

Outside of its subscription concert series, the KSO has performed special concerts for Canada Day, Chinese New Year, the Markham Contemporary Music Festival and New Year's. In 2017, the KSO accompanied Bollywood composer A. R. Rahman at the Sony Centre for the Performing Arts (now Meridian Hall). The orchestra has also performed at the Isabel Bader Theatre, and the Unionville Millennium Theatre.

The KSO also has community outreach and educational programs, with professional development opportunities for emerging artists, music educators, conductors, and composers.

In 2021, the KSO announced that it had become the first orchestra in Canada to replace paper-based sheet music parts with a digital library accessible via iPad Pro tablets made available to all musicians.

== Notable people ==
Music directors:

- Kristian Alexander (2009–present)

Associate conductors:

- Matheus Coelho (2023–present)
- Michael Berec (2015–2023)
- Andrew Chung (2011–2014)
- Scott Harrison (2010–2011)

Assistant conductors:

- Jonás Joya (2021–2023)
- Elli Kozak (2019–2021)
- Patrick Headley (2018–2020)
- Travis Grubisi (2018–2020)
- Joanna Augustine Ng (2016–2017)
- Giancarlo Mincone (2015–2016)
- Matthew Poon (2012–2015)
- Michael Berec (2012–2015)
- Keith Reid (2010–2012)
- Scott Harrison (2009–2010)

Composers-in-residence

- Erik Kreem (2020)
- Chan Wing-wah (2019)
- Vincent Ho (2018)
- Werner Chan (2017)
- Colin Sandquist (2016)
- Heather Schmidt (2015)
- James W. Campbell (2014)
- Kevin Lau (2013)
- Brian Current (2012)
- Gary Kulesha (2011)
- Larysa Kuzmenko (2010)
- Daniel Friedman (2009)
