= Stefan Sanderling =

German conductor

Stefan Sanderling (born 2 August 1964 in East Berlin, East Germany) is an orchestral conductor. He is the son of the conductor Kurt Sanderling and the double-bass player Barbara Sanderling. His half-brother is the conductor Thomas Sanderling. His brother Michael Sanderling is a cellist and conductor.

In his youth, Sanderling played the piano and clarinet. His early university experience was in Halle, Germany. At the Los Angeles Philharmonic Institute, Sanderling studied with the conductors Leonard Slatkin, Yuri Temirkanov, Edo de Waart and John Nelson. He later attended the University of Southern California Thornton School of Music and studied with Daniel Lewis. He also studied with Kurt Masur at the Leipzig conservatory.

Sanderling's first professional position was in Potsdam, Germany. In addition, he has been the music director of the Staatstheater and the Philharmonisches Staatsorchester Mainz (Philharmonic Orchestra). In 1996, he became chief conductor of the Orchestre de Bretagne and served in this capacity until the end of the 2003-2004 season.

In the US, Sanderling was appointed the music director of the Florida Orchestra in May 2002, and he officially assumed this position in the 2003-2004 season. In June 2006, Sanderling extended his contract with the Florida Orchestra through the 2010-2011 season. His contract had been further extended through the 2013-2014 season, at which point he was scheduled to conclude his Florida Orchestra tenure. There were reports of conflict between Sanderling and the orchestra management, regarding finances and programming, as factors in his departure. However, in June 2012, the orchestra announced the early conclusion of Sanderling's Florida Orchestra tenure after the 2011-2012 season. His final appearance with the orchestra was in May 2014.

In the US, Sanderling became principal guest conductor of the Toledo Symphony Orchestra in 2002, with an initial two-year contract. The orchestra subsequently elevated his title to principal conductor, and he held this post through the 2016-2017 season. Sanderling conducted the Toledo Symphony Orchestra in its Carnegie Hall debut in May 2011, as part of the 'Spring for Music' festival. Sanderling became music director of the Chautauqua Symphony Orchestra at the start of the 2008 summer season, a post he held until 2011.

Sanderling is married to the cellist Isabelle Besançon, who formerly played in the Orchestre de Bretagne, where they met. They were married in November 2002. On 31 December 2002, there was an incident at the Raymond James Stadium where the couple was supposed to meet the Tampa businessman David Harbert at an American football game, as guests. A security guard stopped Besançon from entering the stadium because of her oversized purse, a consequence of heightened security concerns after the 11 September 2001 attacks. The incident escalated because a security guard was reported to have stated that he "couldn't risk letting the couple inside because they were foreigners". The matter resolved in a letter of apology from Barbara Casey, director of communications for the Tampa Sports Authority, to Sanderling.

In September 2015, Sanderling was named the next chief conductor of the Liechtenstein Symphony Orchestra, effective with the 2016-2017 season.

Cultural offices
Preceded by Claude Schnitzler	Principal Conductor, Orchestre de Bretagne; 1996–2004	Succeeded by Olari Elts (artistic advisor)
Preceded by Jahja Ling	Music Director, Florida Orchestra; 2003–2012	Succeeded by Michael Francis
Preceded by Andrew Massey (music director)	Principal Conductor, Toledo Symphony Orchestra; 2003–2017	Succeeded by Alain Trudel (music director designate)
Preceded by Uri Segal	Music Director, Chautauqua Symphony Orchestra; 2008–2010	Succeeded by Rossen Milanov
Preceded by Florian Krumpock	Chief Conductor, Liechtenstein Symphony Orchestra; 2016–present	Succeeded by incumbent
