= Louis De Geer =

Louis De Geer may refer to:

People:

- Louis De Geer (1587–1652), industrial entrepreneur of Walloon origin
- Louis De Geer (1622–1695), industrial entrepreneur
- Louis Gerhard De Geer (1818–1896), baron, Prime Minister of Sweden 1876–80
- Gerhard Louis De Geer (1854–1935), baron, Prime Minister of Sweden 1920–21
- Louis De Geer (1910–1987), Swedish diplomat

Other:

- Louis de Geer konsert & kongress, in Norrköping, Sweden
