= Revol Bunin =

Russian composer

Revol Bunin Револь Самуилович Бунин
- Born: 6 April 1924; Moscow, USSR
- Died: 4 July 1976 (aged 52) Moscow, USSR
- Genres: classical music
- Occupation: composer
- Labels: Melodiya, others

Revol Samuilovich Bunin (Russian: Ре́воль Саму́илович Бу́нин; 6 April 1924, in Moscow – 4 July 1976, in Moscow) was a Soviet composer.

== Early life and education ==
Bunin's father, Samuil Markovich, was a bolshevik, a member of the Communist Party from before the 1917 revolution and worked as a professor of social economics at one of the Moscow Institutes. Bunin was named "Revol" after the October Revolution.

Volik (as he was known) was six when he started to write music and he started by writing scores. In the 1930s in Soviet Union score paper was hard to find, so young Bunin would draw lines on plain paper for his compositions. He wrote marches, waltzes, minuets, and polkas.

Bunin's mother was always very ill, and died when he was 14, leaving his upbringing entirely in the hands of his father. When Bunin's mother was dying, she asked him to play the piano for her. He played Bach, Beethoven, Mozart, and Mussorgsky through the night. Next morning he had his first attack of asthma, a disease that would in the end kill him.

In 1938 Revol started his composition studies at the Music School of the Moscow Conservatory under Ilya Litinsky. During his third year of studies he was admitted to the Conservatory and continued under Vissarion Shebalin, who was, at the time, the Conservatory's director. In 1941, he was summoned first to work at the military factory in Moscow and then was drafted to an active duty. So that he could continue to attend his classes, given his musical gift, he was stationed near Moscow. He was decommissioned on the grounds of ill health in March 1943.

In June 1943 Shostakovich started to teach at the Moscow Conservatory and Bunin was the first student he selected to be his pupil. In his article "With great appreciation", published posthumously in the magazine Soviet Music in September 1976, Bunin wrote "... We were more and more conquered by Shostakovich's works. Secretly, I was dreaming of becoming his student. Finally, this happy day came on 7 June 1943, in classroom number 31... At the piano a friendly man, dressed in a gray-colored modest suit, wearing horn-rimmed spectacles. He looked very young, nothing like the old eminent scholars of the Conservatory. He asked me in detail how old I was, when I had started to compose, who were my teachers, whether I had studied polyphony and so on; he subjected me to a small exam – I had to read a Haydn symphony score, tell him what was the difference between a passacaglia and a chaconne, give examples, known to me, of a mirror reprise in symphonic allegro, and give examples for the use of French horns and trumpets in a rare formation (H, Fis). Shostakovich was interested to know if I read a lot and if I liked Chekhov and Leskov...”

For a while, Bunin was Shostakovich's only student. He graduated from the Conservatory in 1945 with honors. Shebalin could not forgive Bunin's defection to Shostakovich's class from his own and did not allow his name to be added to the "Golden Board" of exemplary students.

== Composer ==
In 1947, Bunin moved to Leningrad, where he taught music arrangement at the Leningrad Conservatory and assisted Shostakovich as a co-professor of composition. In the same year, his 2nd Symphony was premiered in Leningrad, under the direction of Yevgeny Mravinsky.

In 1948, he moved back to Moscow and worked as an editor for the State Music Publishing House.

After a government decree set stringent regulations on music and art in the Soviet Union, Shostakovich was dismissed from his post of Professor at the Conservatory. Consequently, his assistant, Bunin, also lost his position and became, for a while, a persona non grata. He had to make his living by writing scores for other composers. His music won the Stalin Prize on several occasions, but Bunin’s name did not appear, nor was it mentioned to the selection committee.

== Death and legacy ==
Revol Bunin died on 3 July 1976 in Moscow. He was mourned by his wife, Larisa, his friends and many students. He had no children. He was never awarded State honors, for he refused to join the Communist Party, in contrast to many of his colleagues.

Bunin wrote music scores for 48 motion pictures, cartoons, and documentaries. He left 45 major compositions, including nine symphonies, numerous sonatas, quartets, trios, an opera, romances, and several concertos for both piano and violin. His Viola Concerto was composed in 1953 and dedicated to his close friend, violist Rudolf Barshai, who would later found and direct the Moscow Chamber Orchestra.

== Selected works ==
Stage

- Masquerade (Маскарад), Opera (1944); after the drama Masquerade by Mikhail Lermontov
- Narodovoltsi (Народовольцы), Opera in 3 acts, 10 scenes with prologue and epilogue; libretto by A. Medvedev after the 1889 novel Andrey Kozhukhov (Андрей Кожухов) by Sergey Stepnyak-Kravchinsky

Orchestral

- Symphony No. 1 (1943)
- Symphony No. 2 (1945)
- The Stone Guest (Каменный гость), Symphonic Poem after Aleksandr Pushkin (1949)
- Overture-Fantasy (Увертюра-фантазия) (1953)
- Symphony No. 3 (1957)
- Symphony No. 4, Op. 30 (1959)
- Symphony No. 5, Op. 32 (1961)
- Concerto for chamber orchestra (1961)
- Music for Strings (Музыка для струнных) in D minor, Op. 36 (1965)
- Symphony No. 6, Op. 37 (1966)
- 1967, Symphonic Poem, Op. 38 (1967)
- Symphony No. 7 (1969)
- Symphony No. 8 for chamber orchestra (1970)
- Symphony No. 9 (1975)
- Symphony No. 10

Concertante

- Poem for viola and orchestra (1952)
- Concerto in G major for viola and orchestra, Op. 22 (1953)
- Concerto in G minor for organ and chamber orchestra, Op. 33 (1961)
- Concerto in G minor for piano and orchestra, Op. 34 (1963)
- Concertante Symphony (Концертная симфония), Concerto for violin and orchestra, Op. 43 (1972)

Chamber music

- String Quartet No. 1 (1943)
- Piano Quintet (1946)
- Piano Trio (1946)
- Sonata for violin and piano (1955)
- Sonata in D minor for viola and piano, Op.26 (1955)
- Suite for viola and piano (1955)
- String Quartet No. 2, Op. 27 (1956)

Piano

- Sonatina (1939)
- Partita No. 1 for piano (1947)
- Partita No. 2 for piano (1951)
- Children's Album (Детский альбом) (1961)
- Piano Sonata in F♯ minor, Op. 42 (1971)

Vocal

- Lead Us On (Веди нас, дорога), Oratorio for soloists, chorus and orchestra after William Shakespeare, Op. 35 (1964)
- Несжатая полоса, Cycle of poems for chorus (1958); words by Nikolay Nekrasov
- Songs on Poems of Sergey Yesenin (Романсы на стихи Сергея Есенина) for medium voice and piano; words by Sergei Yesenin

Film scores

- Two Lives (Две жизни; also called "Сестры", Sisters) (1956); directed by Konstantin Voynov
- Ten Days That Shook the World (Десять дней, которые потрясли мир) (1968); after the 1919 book by John Reed

Animated cartoons

- Two Greedy Bears (Два жадных медвежонка) (1954)
- Three Penguins (Три пингвина) (1961)
- The Flying Proletarian (Летающий пролетарий) (1962)
- Moskvichok (Москвичок) (1963)

== Recordings ==
- Concerto for viola and orchestra in G major opus 22 (1953) LP Melodiya D 5956-7: Radio Orchestra, Nikolay Anosov (cond.), Rudolf Barshai (viola)
- Sonata for viola and piano opus 26 LP Melodiya D 03972-3: Rudolf Barshai (viola), Tatyana Nikolayeva (piano)
- Concerto for organ and chamber orchestra in G minor opus 33 LP Melodiya D 10707-8: Moscow Chamber Orchestra, Rudolf Barshai (cond.), S. Dizhur (organ)
- Concerto for piano and orchestra in G minor opus 34 (1963) LP Melodiya CM 02393-4: Moscow Chamber Orchestra, Rudolf Barshai (cond), V. Devetzi (piano)
- "Lead Us On", oratorio after W. Shakespeare opus 35 (1964) LP Melodiya CM 04277-8: Moscow Chamber Orchestra, Moscow Boys' Chorus, Rudolf Barshai (conductor), V. Turchanovich (soprano), S. Yakovenko (bass)
- Symphony No. 5 opus 45 (1961) LP Melodiya D 027253-4: Moscow PO, R. Barshai (cond.) also on CD: Brilliant Classics Cat No. 9010 "Historical Russian Archives"
- Symphony No. 6 (1966) CD Revelation RV 10105: Ministry of Culture Symphony Orchestra, Gennady Rozhdestvensky (conductor)
- Symphony No. 8 (1970) LP Melodiya C10 12859: USSR Cinematographic Orchestra, Aleksandr Lazarev (conductor)
- Concerto for violin and orchestra "Concertante Symphony" opus 43 (1972) LP Melodiya C10 10311: USSR State SO, Aleksandr Lazarev (cond), Leonid Kogan (violin) also on CD: Revalation
- Music for strings in D minor LP Melodiya CM 02393-4: Moscow Chamber Orchestra, Rudolf Barshai (conductor)
- Music to the Film "Ten Days That Shook the World" LP Melodiya C10 12859: USSR Cinematographic Orchestra, E. Khachaturian (conductor)
