= Arpad Joó =

Hungarian American conductor (1948–2014)

Árpád Joó (8 June 1948 – 4 July 2014) was a Hungarian American conductor and concert pianist.

== Early life ==
Maestro Joó (pronounced: Yo) was born in Budapest in 1948. His grandmother was an eminent pupil of István Thomán, at the Franz Liszt Academy (a direct disciple of Franz Liszt). At a very early age, his mother, herself an accomplished pianist and teacher had discovered his musical talent. At the age of five he began his musical studies with his mother and a year later he entered the then newly established Kodály School of Music, under the personal supervision of the Hungarian composer-educator Zoltán Kodály.

In short time, he attracted the attention of Kodály himself, who developed a lifelong teacher-student relationship with Joó, which lasted until the death of the composer. During his studies in the Kodály school he was introduced by his teachers to visiting musicians such as Igor Stravinsky, Aram Khachaturian, Pablo Casals, Carl Orff, Yehudi Menuhin, and Dmitri Shostakovich. He studied at the Bartók Conservatory and, at the age of 16, he was admitted to the university level of the Franz Liszt Academy of Music where he studied piano with Joseph Gat and Pál Kadosa.

By this time Joó had won his first international piano competition in Taormina in Italy, playing the Liszt Piano Concerto No. 1. As a child prodigy he periodically visited Salzburg, Austria, to study at the Mozarteum. At the age of 17 he was invited to give a solo recital in the Montreux festival (Switzerland) in the same series as Martha Argerich, Geza Anda and Arturo Benedetti Michelangeli. Joó's piano performances took him to Switzerland, Germany, Czechoslovakia and Germany.

== Career ==
At the age of 20, Joó emigrated to the United States, to study at the Juilliard School in New York City as a special student. In his first year of study at Juilliard, he won first prize of the International Franz Liszt Piano Competition in Boston, Massachusetts. He became a citizen of the United States and started his conducting career in San Diego, California, at the age of 21, conducting at the Summer Festival a production of Mozart's Le Nozze di Figaro. At the age of 22, he entered Indiana University, in Bloomington, Indiana, to study conducting. Joó graduated with a MM in conducting (orchestral and opera). During this time he also studied conducting with Igor Markevitch in Monte Carlo after which he was named the resident music director and principal conductor of the Knoxville Symphony Orchestra in Tennessee at the age of 24. Joó was the youngest ever music director/conductor of a metropolitan orchestra in the history of the United States.

During this time he guest conducted in many places including the Netherlands, Mexico, and the US. At the age of 26, the cultural arm of the United Nations, UNESCO, selected him to conduct a special performance representing the United States in Monte Carlo — which he accomplished to great critical acclaim. At this time he became a private student/confidante of the Italian conductor Carlo Maria Giulini. Next he became the music director and principal conductor of the Calgary Philharmonic Orchestra. During this time he had many guest conducting appearances all over the world, with many leading orchestras of the world, including the London Symphony Orchestra, the Philharmonia Orchestra of London, London Philharmonic Orchestra, Amsterdam Philharmonic, Budapest Philharmonic Orchestra, and Vienna Tonkunstler Orchestra.

In 1980 and 1981, Joó recorded the complete orchestral works of Béla Bartók with the Budapest Symphony and Philharmonic Orchestras. Virtually all the newspapers and magazines in the United States and Europe such as Newsweek, Time, New York Times, Los Angeles Times, San Francisco Chronicle, Saturday Review, Chicago Tribune, The Times, (even Sports Illustrated and National Geographic) hailed these recordings as a milestone both in digital (then new) technology and the quality of the performances. Stereo Review (1981) awarded the Record of the Year to Joó for his five-disc Bartók set. In 1982, he recorded the complete orchestral works of Kodály. For the next 15 years, he conducted many of the leading orchestras of the world and toured in Germany, England, Italy, Austria, Hungary, and the Netherlands.

In 1987, Joó took the position of music director and principal conductor of the Orquesta Sinfonica De Radio Television Espanola in Madrid, Spain (Spanish Radio and Television Orchestra) under royal patronage. He was only the third foreign–born conductor to hold this position (after Igor Markevitch and Sergiu Comissiona). In 1987, Joó recorded the complete orchestral works of Franz Liszt for which he has received the coveted "Grand Prix du Disque" in Paris, directly from the French Minister of Culture, Mr. Leotard.

Joó held the positions of principal guest conductor of the Budapest Symphony Orchestra, principal guest conductor of the European Community Chamber Orchestra. (Residency: London, England) Later he became the music director and conductor of Brabant Orchestra in the Netherlands, conducting many performances throughout Europe (Brighton, England festival, Concertgebouw Amsterdam). Joó also conducted concert tours with the Budapest Symphony Orchestra (Germany 10 concerts), Budapest Philharmonic Orchestra (Germany 25-25 concerts), Hungarian State Orchestra (England 8 concerts), Budapest Concert Orchestra (Netherlands, Italy, Spain 22 concerts), the Spanish Radio Orchestra (France, Spain), and Philharmonia Hungarica. He founded in Budapest, Hungary, the European Symphony Orchestra, of which he was the principal conductor since 1998.

In addition to his busy conducting schedule Joó taught master classes and has given lectures at various US and Canadian universities, such as Indiana University (visiting professor of music), Banff Centre of the Arts (Canada), Mount Royal College, University of Alberta, Canada; for two years in succession he has taken over the master classes in conducting for young conductors in Assisi, Italy from Franco Ferrara. In 1992 he served on the jury of the Paloma O'Shea Santander International Piano Competition in Spain.

== Recordings ==
He has recorded for many international labels, including Hungaroton, Philips, Sefel, Arts, Erasmus, RCA, and Laserlight. His discography includes more than 50 CDs.

== Selected discography ==
=== With the Philharmonia Orchestra of London ===
- R. Strauss: Ein Heldenleben
- R. Strauss: Suites from the Rosenkavalier and "Die Frau Ohne Schatten"
- Tchaikovsky: Symphony No. 5.
- Wagner: Operatic Arias with Eva Marton

=== With the London Symphony Orchestra ===
- Janáček: Sinfonietta
- Kodály: Hary Janos Suite
- Tchaikovsky: Romeo and Juliet Overture
- Suite Nr. 3
- Brahms : Sympnhony Nr 4
- Ravel: Bolero
- Daphnis Suite Nr.2

=== With the Amsterdam Philharmonic ===
- Mahler: Symphony nr. 1 (Record of the Year award)
- Brahms: Concerto for Violin and Cello (Double Concerto)

=== With the Budapest Symphony Orchestra ===
- Liszt: Complete Symphonic Poems (5 CDs)- "Grand Prix Du Disque", Paris, France
- Complete Orchestral Works of Kodály
- Complete orchestral Works of Bartók (With Budapest Philharmonic), Stereo Review Record of the Year award
- Mahler: Symphony no. 8 (Symphony of a Thousand)
- Mendelssohn: Violin Concerto in e minor

=== With the Spanish Radio Orchestra ===
- Selected Orchestral Showpieces

=== With the European Symphony Orchestra ===
- Dvořák: Slavonic Dances
- Brahms: Hungarian Dances

== Video productions ==
- Beethoven: 9th Symphony (Hungarian Festival Orchestra)
- Liszt: Legend of the St Elisabeth, Oratorio.(Hungarian State Orchestra and Choir with Soloists)
- Mahler: Symphony Nr. 8 (Symphony of a thousand), Budapest Symphony Orchestra and 5 participating Choirs with Soloists)
- Mahler: Symphony Nr. 2 (Hungarian State Orchestra)

N.B. Biographical material of Joó's conducting career and repertoire in opera is not included in this short and partial biographical sketch.

Cultural offices
Preceded by Miguel Ángel Gómez Martínez	Director, RTVE Symphony Orchestra; 1988–1990	Succeeded by Sergiu Comissiona
