= Alan Buribayev =

Kazakh orchestral conductor

Alan Buribayev Алан Асқарұлы Бөрібаев Алан Аскарович Бурибаев
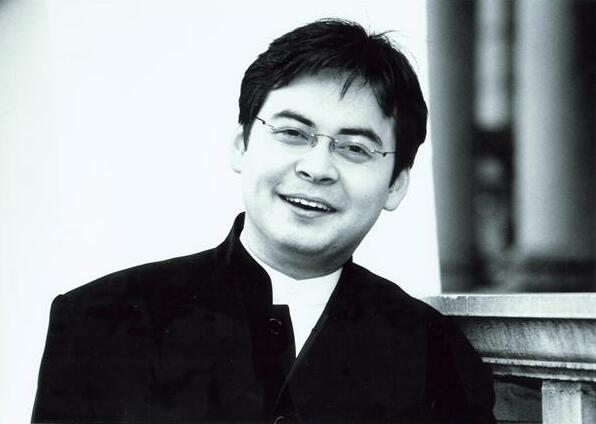

Background information
- Born: 30 May 1979 (age 47); Alma-Ata, Kazakh SSR, USSR
- Occupation: Conductor

Alan Buribayev (Kazakh: Алан Асқарұлы Бөрібаев, Alan Asqarulı Börıbaev; Russian: Алан Аскарович Бурибаев; surname also spelled Buribaev in English) (born 30 May 1979) is a Kazakh orchestral conductor. He is currently the Chief Conductor of the Astana Opera House.

== Career ==
The son of a cellist/conductor father and a pianist mother, he studied violin and conducting at the Kazakh National Conservatory in Almaty. He was later a conducting student of Uroš Lajovic in Vienna. Buribayev won prizes in the International Competition of Young Conductors Lovro von Matačić in Zagreb and in the Antonio Pedrotti Competition in 2001.

Buribayev began his tenure as Principal Conductor of the Astana Symphony Orchestra, Kazakhstan, in March 2003, and had concluded his tenure by 2007. From 2004 to 2007, Buribayev was "Generalmusikdirektor" of the Meiningen Theatre, Germany. He became Principal Conductor of the Norrköping Symphony Orchestra in the 2007–2008 season, with an initial contract through 2010. He became chief conductor of Het Brabants Orkest in the Netherlands with the 2008–2009 season. From 2010 to 2016, he was Principal Conductor of the RTÉ National Symphony Orchestra in Dublin, Ireland. He is currently the Chief Conductor of the Astana Opera House.

Preceded by Lü Jia	Principal Conductor, Norrköping Symphony Orchestra; 2007–2011	Succeeded by Michael Francis
Preceded by Marc Soustrot	Chief Conductor, Het Brabants Orkest; 2008-2012	Succeeded by Orchestra merged with the Limburg Symphony Orchestra
Preceded by Gerhard Markson	Principal Conductor, RTÉ National Symphony Orchestra; 2010–2016	Succeeded by Jaime Martín
