= Karl-Heinz Steffens =

German clarinetist and conductor (born 1961)

- Born: 28 November 1961 (age 64); Trier, Germany
- Occupation: Conductor
- Instrument: Clarinet

Karl-Heinz Steffens (born 28 November 1961) is a German clarinetist and conductor.

== Biography ==
Steffens studied clarinet from 1982 to 1985 at the State University of Music and Performing Arts Stuttgart with Ulf Rodenhäuser. His first professional engagement was as a clarinetist at the Staatstheater Kassel. He subsequently was principal clarinetist in the orchestra of Oper Frankfurt (1985–1989), in the Bavarian Radio Symphony Orchestra (1989–1996), and the Berlin Philharmonic (2001–2007), in addition to maintaining a solo career.

From 2009 to 2018, Steffens was music director of the Deutsche Staatsphilharmonie Rheinland-Pfalz in Ludwigshafen. Steffens and the orchestra recorded commercially for the Capriccio label. During his tenure, the orchestra received such honours as the ECHO award for Best Orchestra in 2015 for their recording of works by Bernd Alois Zimmermann.

Steffens was music director of the Norwegian National Opera and Ballet from 2016 to 2018. In 2017, Steffens announced his intention to stand down early from the Den Norske Opera and Ballet post, owing to conflicts with then-incoming artistic director Annilese Miskimmon. He concluded his tenure with Den Norske Opera and Ballet in 2018.

In February 2019, the Prague State Opera announced the appointment of Steffens as its next music director, effective with the 2019–2020 season. In October 2019, the Norrköping Symphony Orchestra announced the appointment of Steffens as its next principal conductor and artistic advisor, effective with the 2020–2021 season.

Cultural offices
Preceded by Ari Rasilainen	Chief Conductor, Staatsphilharmonie Rheinland-Pfalz; 2009–2018	Succeeded by Michael Francis
Preceded by John Fiore	Music Director, Norwegian National Opera and Ballet; 2016–2018	Succeeded by Edward Gardner
Preceded by Andreas Sebastian Weiser	Music Director, Prague State Opera; 2019–present	Succeeded by incumbent
Preceded by Michael Francis	Principal Conductor, Norrköping Symphony Orchestra; 2020–present	Succeeded by incumbent
