= Symphony No. 14 (Shostakovich) =

1969 vocal symphony by Dmitri Shostakovich

- by Dmitri Shostakovich
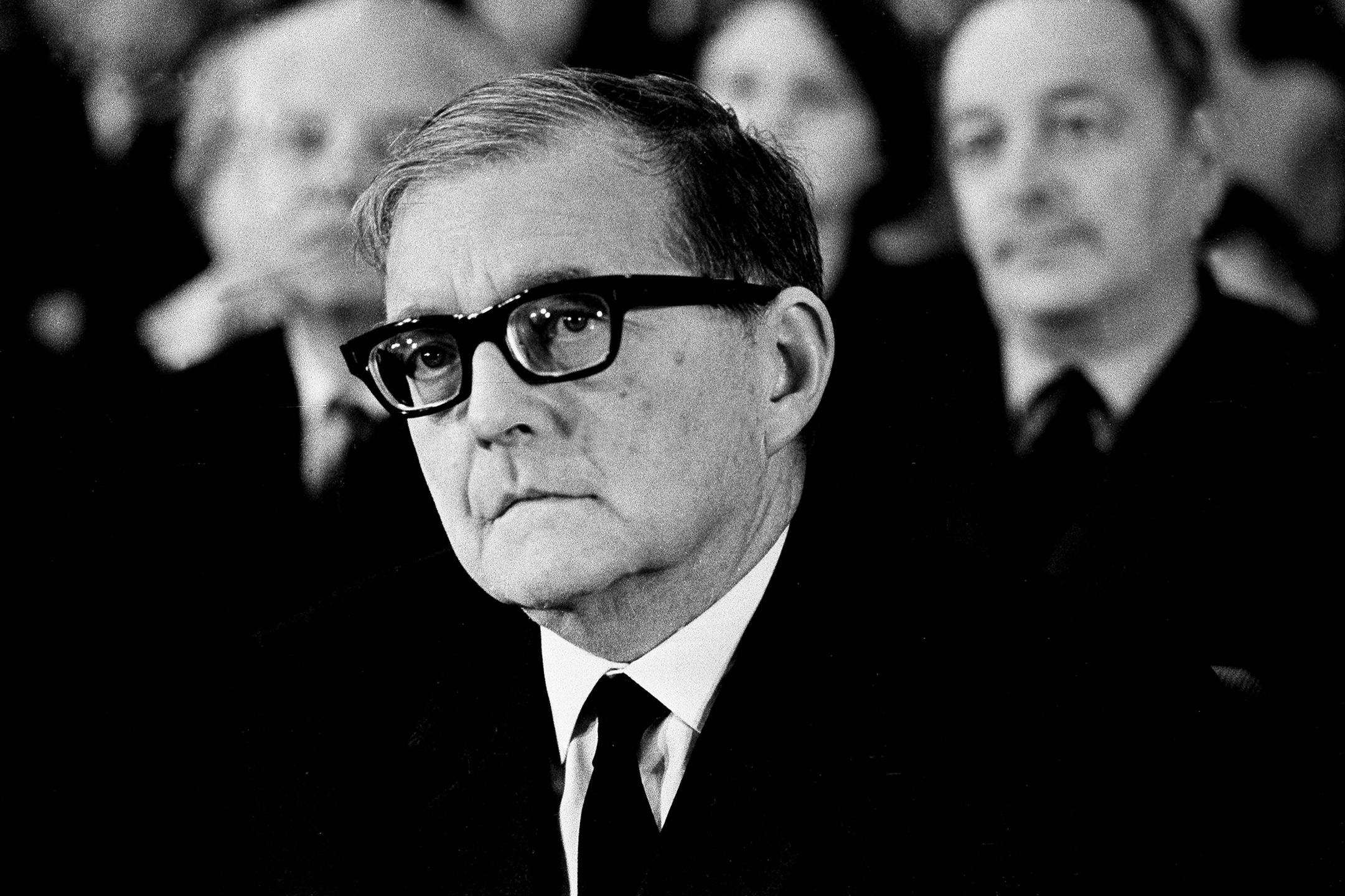
- Shostakovich in the 1970s
- Key: G minor
- Opus: 135
- Language: Russian
- Composed: 1969
- Dedication: Benjamin Britten
- Duration: c. 50 minutes
- Movements: 11
- Scoring: Soprano, string orchestra, percussion

Premiere
- Date: 29 September 1969
- Location: Leningrad
- Conductor: Rudolf Barshai
- Performers: Moscow Chamber Orchestra

The Symphony No. 14 in G minor, Op. 135, by Dmitri Shostakovich was completed in the spring of 1969, and was premiered later that year. It is a work for soprano, bass and a small string orchestra with percussion, consisting of eleven linked settings of poems by four authors. Most of the poems deal with the theme of death, particularly that of unjust or early death. They were set in Russian, although two other versions of the work exist with the texts all back-translated from Russian either into their original languages or into German. The symphony is dedicated to Benjamin Britten (who gave the UK premiere the following year at Aldeburgh).

== Instrumentation ==
Besides the soloists, the symphony is scored for a chamber orchestra consisting only of strings and percussion. The strings consist of ten violins, four violas, three cellos, and two double basses, and the percussion section (two players) includes wood block, castanets, whip, soprano, alto and tenor tom-toms, xylophone, tubular bells, vibraphone, and celesta. The percussion section does not include common instruments such as timpani, bass drum, cymbals, or triangle.

== Movements ==
The work has eleven linked movements, each a setting of a poem, with a total duration of around 50 minutes:

Much of the setting is in a quasi-parlando style.

1. Adagio. "De profundis" (Federico García Lorca)
2. Allegretto. "Malagueña" (Federico García Lorca)
3. Allegro molto. "Loreley" (Guillaume Apollinaire)
4. Adagio. "Le Suicidé" (Guillaume Apollinaire)
5. Allegretto. "Les Attentives I" (On watch) (Guillaume Apollinaire)
6. Adagio. "Les Attentives II" (Madam, look!) (Guillaume Apollinaire)
7. Adagio. "À la Santé" (Guillaume Apollinaire)
8. Allegro. "Réponse des Cosaques Zaporogues au Sultan de Constantinople" (Guillaume Apollinaire)
9. Andante. "O, Del'vig, Del'vig!" (Wilhelm Küchelbecker)
10. Largo. "Der Tod des Dichters" (Rainer Maria Rilke)
11. Moderato. "Schlußstück" (Rainer Maria Rilke)

The opening bars of the symphony, played by the first violins.

The first movement begins with the violins playing a theme reminiscent of the Dies irae, which plays a prominent role in the history of Russian music. Fragments of the theme are developed in various sections throughout the symphony; it recurs in its entirety in the climactic penultimate movement.

The work shows Shostakovich's willingness to adopt new techniques. All but two of the movements include themes using tone rows, which he uses to convey a sense of the abstract. He also makes dramatic use of tone clusters, such as the fortissimo chord illustrating the lily growing from the suicide's mouth in the fourth movement.

== Overview ==
=== Composition ===
The Fourteenth Symphony was a creative response to Modest Mussorgsky's Songs and Dances of Death, which Shostakovich had orchestrated in 1962. Like Mussorgsky, Shostakovich brings back the subject of death in various images and situations. The Mussorgsky cycle contains only four songs — too few to do justice to Mussorgsky's concept, Shostakovich felt. He proceeded to expand it by selecting 11 poems by Federico García Lorca, Guillaume Apollinaire, Wilhelm Küchelbecker and Rainer Maria Rilke.

Shostakovich attached great importance to this work, commenting in a letter to Glikman: "Everything that I have written until now over these long years has been a preparation for this work." He added that he intended the symphony to prove a counterweight to the positive presentation of death in music:

"In part, I am trying to polemicise with the great classics who touched upon the theme of death in their work.... Remember the death of Boris Godunov. When ... he dies, then a kind of brightening sets in. Remember Verdi's Otello. When the whole tragedy ends, and Desdemona and Otello die, we also experience a beautiful tranquility. Remember Aida. When the tragic demise of the hero and heroine occurs, it is softened with radiant music."

In Mussorgsky's song cycle Shostakovich found a model that spoke out against death; in his symphony, he attempted to expand this protest still further. The composer wrote in his preface to the score:

I want listeners to reflect upon my new symphony ... to realise that they must lead pure and fruitful lives for the glory of their Motherland, their people and the most progressive ideas motivating our socialist society. That is what I was thinking about as I wrote my new work. I want my listeners, as they leave the hall after hearing my symphony, to think that life is truly beautiful.

While Shostakovich's intent may have been to emphasise that life is truly beautiful, he did so by starkly underlining the opposite — that the end of life is ugly and irredeemably negative. Toward this end, Shostakovich's music is sober in nature, and the composer was soon to extend these ideas in his last four string quartets as musical reflections on the themes of suffering and death. As in his orchestration of Songs, his orchestration of the symphony is spare but extremely imaginative. His writing for the voice is in small intervals, with much tonal repetition and attention paid to natural declamation. This practice is taken directly from Mussorgsky.

=== Premieres ===
The work received its official premiere in Leningrad on 29 September 1969 by the Moscow Chamber Orchestra under Rudolf Barshai. Four singers were involved in the first presentations of the work: the sopranos Galina Vishnevskaya and Margarita Miroshnikova, and the basses Mark Reshetin and Yevgeny Vladimirov. An initial performance, preceding the official Moscow and Leningrad premieres, was given by Miroshnikova and Vladimirov, but sources differ as to the vocalists in the official premieres. The official premiere recording on Melodiya was with Miroshnikova and Vladimirov.

The pre-premiere performance on 21 June 1969 was attended by Pavel Apostolov, one of the composer's fiercest critics. He suffered a heart attack during the fifth movement. He died on 19 July.

The UK premiere was held at the Aldeburgh Festival in 1970 and was conducted by the dedicatee, Benjamin Britten.

=== Criticism ===
The composer himself was initially unsure what to call the work, eventually designating it a symphony rather than a song cycle to emphasise the unity of the work musically and philosophically: most of the poems deal with the subject of mortality (he rejected the title oratorio because the work lacks a chorus; it is not a choral symphony for the same reason).

Not all the movements are linked; there are a few breaks between movements that effectively divide the work into a "conventional" four-movement structure.

Many at the time (including Aleksandr Solzhenitsyn and Lev Lebedinsky) criticised the work as too pessimistic. Wilson argues that on the contrary "through careful ordering of the texts [he] conveys a specific message of protest at the arbitrary power exercised by dictators in sending the innocent to their deaths" (p. 411).

Shostakovich reportedly answered his critics in Testimony:

[My critics] read this idea in the Fourteenth Symphony: "death is all-powerful." They wanted the finale to be comforting, to say that death is only the beginning. But it's not a beginning, it's the real end, there will be nothing afterwards, nothing. I feel you must look truth right in the eyes ... To deny death and its power is useless. Deny it or not, you'll die anyway ... It's stupid to protest against death as such, but you can and must protest against violent death. It's bad when people die before their time from disease or poverty, but it's worse when a man is killed by another man.

The absence from the symphony of redemption or transcendence drew protests not only in the Soviet Union but also in the West, where the work was considered both obsessive and limited spiritually. Shostakovich was determined to avoid false consolation. This intent was a prime stimulus in writing the work. Some have found that the work's embracing of human mortality has been expressed with tremendous clarity. Others have found the work bleakly pessimistic and, especially in its opening De Profundis, virtually nihilistic. Regardless of opinion, the Fourteenth in performance is agreed to be a profound and powerful experience.
