= Orchestre National de Bretagne =

French symphonic orchestra

The Orchestre National de Bretagne (ONB; Breton: Laz-seniñ broadel Breizh) is a French symphony orchestra, based in the Brittany region. The current musical direcotor of the ONB is Nicolas Ellis.

== History ==
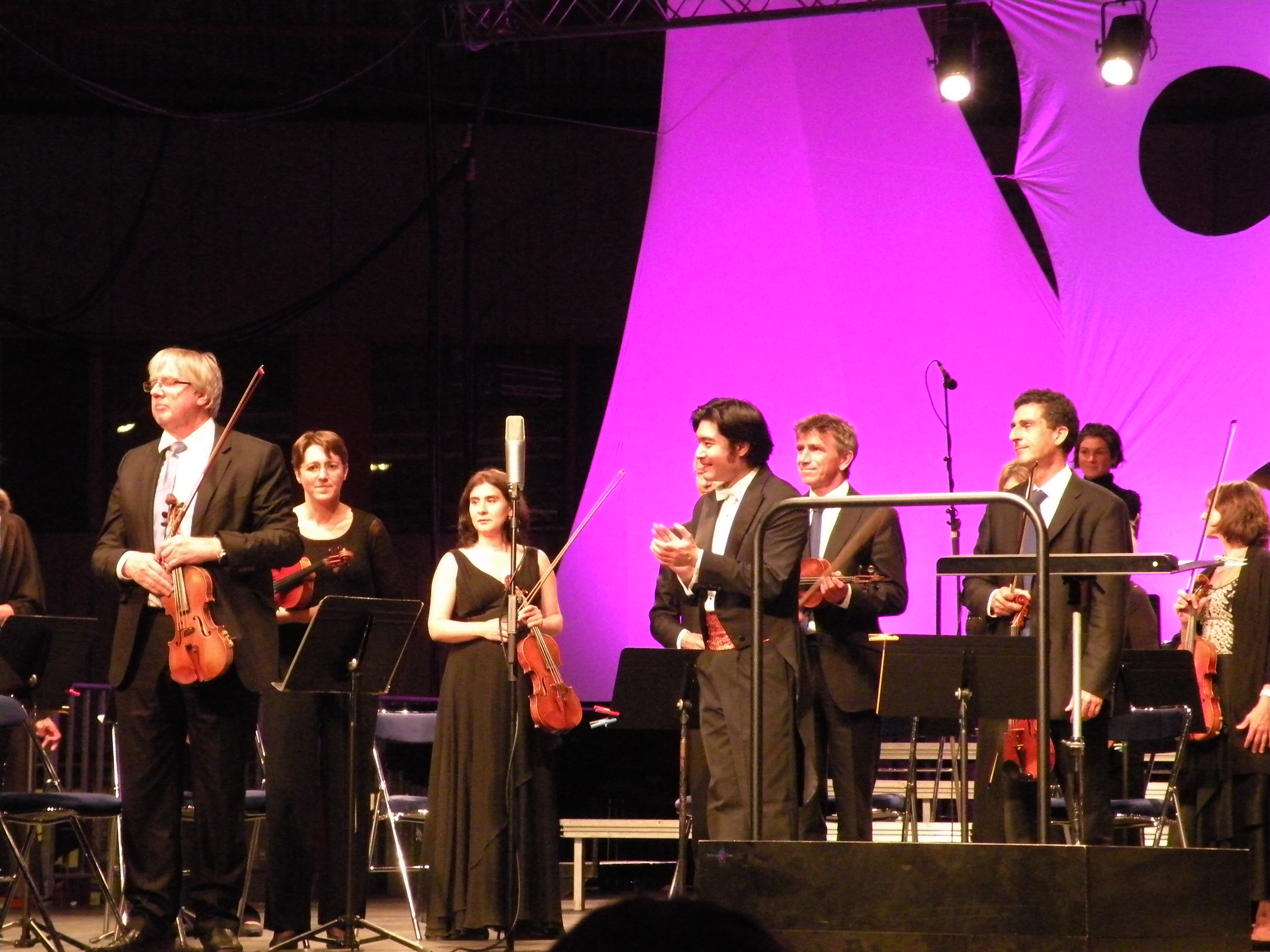
The Brittany Symphony Orchestra during the 2012 Summer Concerts

The orchestra was founded in 1989 as the Orchestre de Bretagne, and retained this name until April 2012. The orchestra subsequently took up the name of Orchestre symphonique de Bretagne, and in October 2019, the orchestra was granted national status and was renamed the Orchestre national de Bretagne. The orchestra performs in various locales throughout Brittany, which include:

- Opéra (Rennes)
- Couvent des Jacobins (Rennes)
- La Confluence (Betton)
- L'Archipel (Fouesnant)
- Théâtre du Champ au Roy (Guingamp)
- Théâtre de Cornouaille (Quimper)
- Espace Kéraudy (Plougonvelin)
- Le Roudour (Saint-Martin-des-Champs)
- L'Hermine (Sarzeau)

Claude Schnitzler was the first music director of the orchestra, from 1989 to 1995. Subsequent music directors have included Stefan Sanderling (1996–2003) and Darrell Ang (2012–2015). Moshe Atzmon was principal guest conductor from 2004 to 2012. Olari Elts was music advisor from 2006 to 2012. The ONB's most recent music director was Grant Llewellyn. from 2015 to 2023. In November 2023, the ONB announced the appointment of Nicolas Ellis as its next music director, effective with the 2024–2025 season, with an initial contract of four seasons.

In early 2015, the Orchestre National de Bretagne launched its own record label.

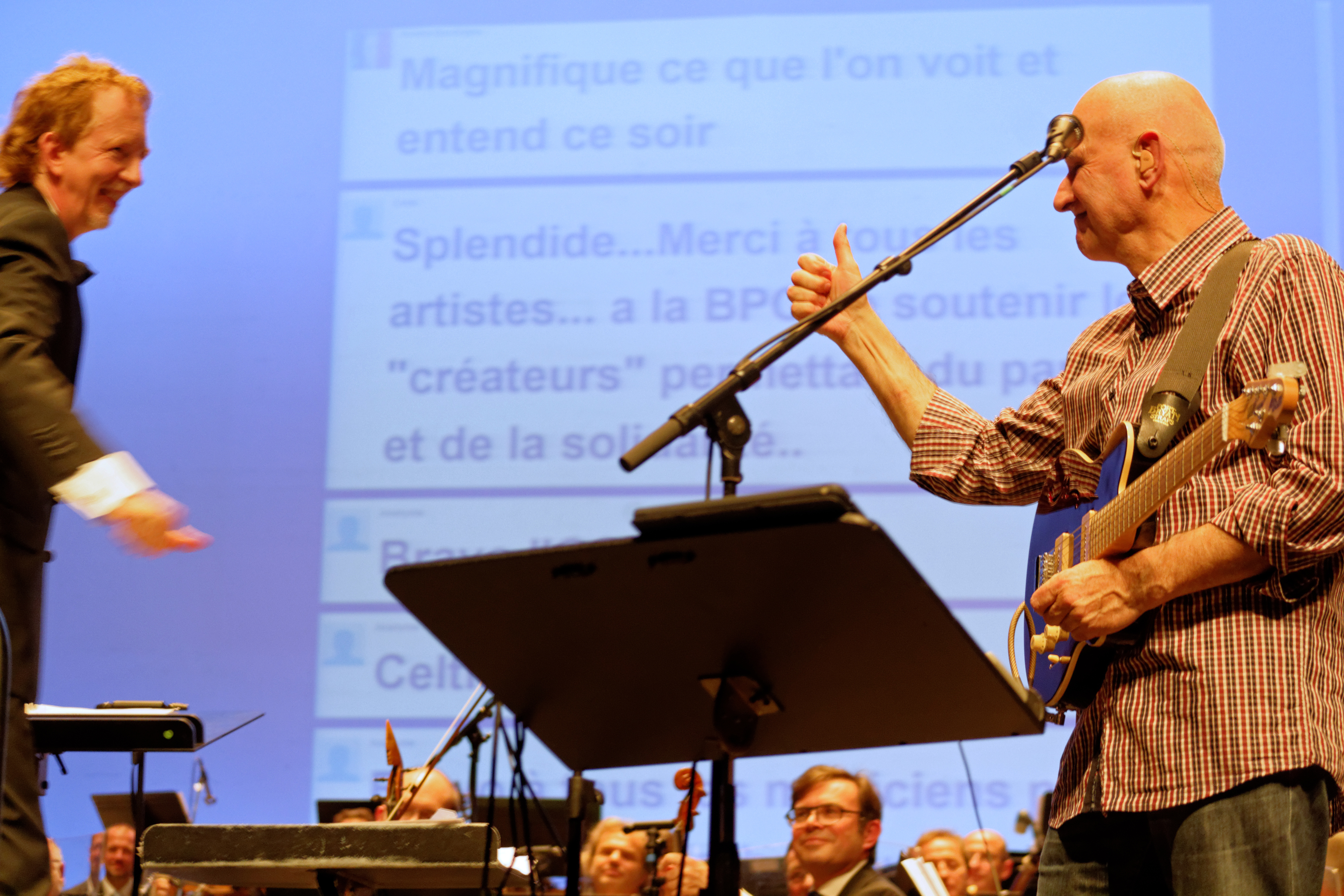
Projet Taliesin 2015 with Derek Gleeson and Dan Ar Braz

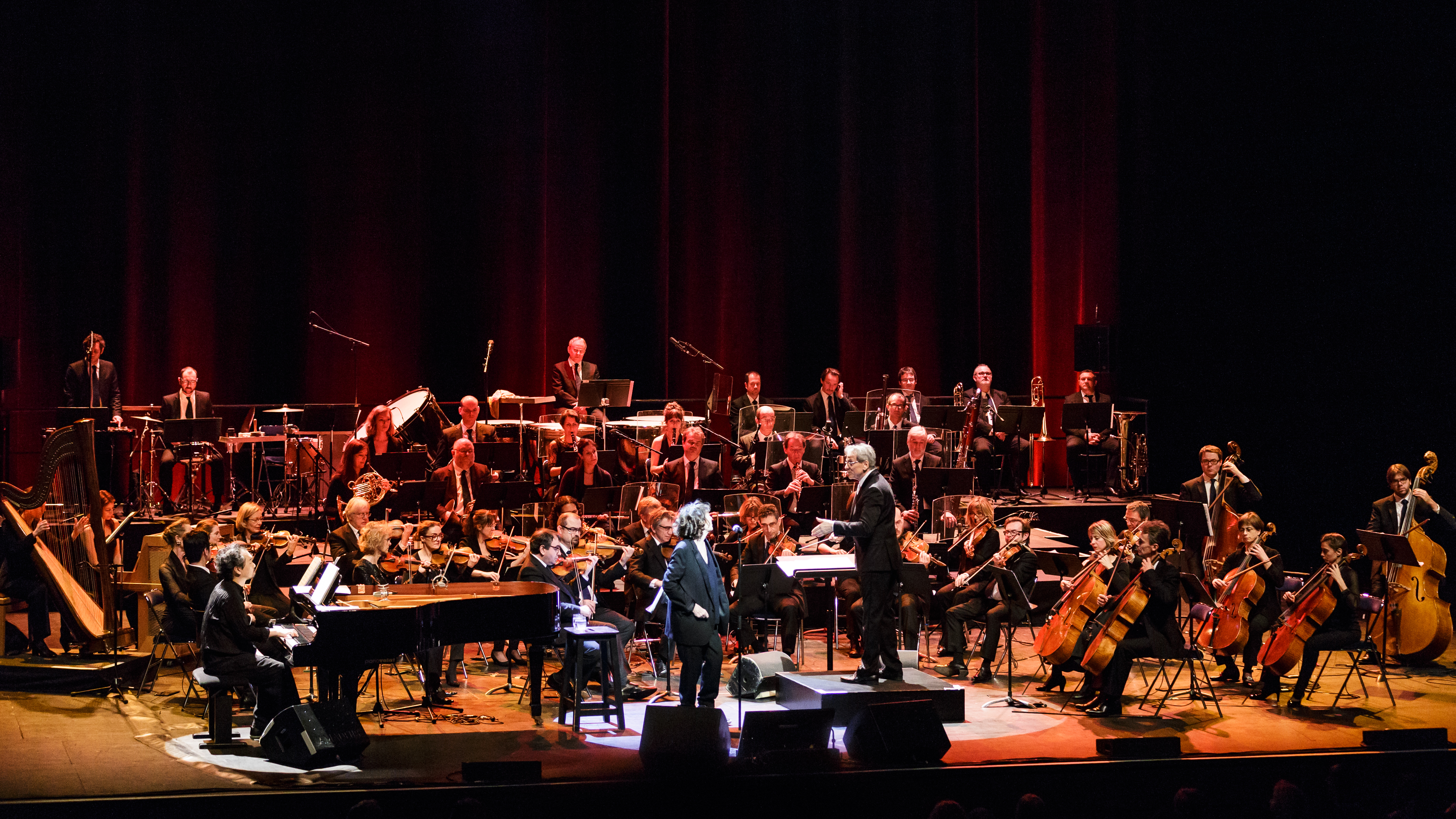
Gainsbourg Symphonique with Jane Birkin in 2017

== Music directors ==
- Claude Schnitzler (1989–1995)
- Stefan Sanderling (1996–2003)
- Darrell Ang (2012–2015)
- Grant Llewellyn (2015–2023)
- Nicholas Ellis (2024–present)

== Recordings ==
- Beethoven – Concerto pour piano n°1 rondo
- Schumann – Concerto pour piano allegro affettuoso
- Haydn – Concerto pour violoncelle Moderato
- Ropartz – Pêcheur d’Islande les danses
- Tanguy – Portraits XXI Intrada
- Jean Cras – Mélodies avec orchestre
- Didier Squiban – Symphonie Bretagne
- Didier Squiban – Symphonie Iroise
- Serge Prokofiev – Peter and the Wolf / Perig Hag Bleiz
- Mozart – Concertos n°9 and 20
- Louise Farrenc – the complete symphonies (3 symphonies)
