= Moscow Chamber Orchestra =

Russian orchestra in Moscow

- Orchestra
- Founded: 1955
- Principal conductor: Alexei Utkin

The Moscow Chamber Orchestra (MCO) is a chamber orchestra run under the auspices of the Moscow Philharmonia, a state-run enterprise, formerly under the patronage of the Ministry of Culture (Soviet Union) and now, Ministry of Culture of Russian Federation.

The MCO has performed throughout Russia and other East European countries. The orchestra was founded in 1955 by Rudolf Barshai. The MCO has since played in over eighty nations.

== History ==
Rudolf Barshai, a founding member of Borodin Quartet, left the Quartet to pursue his conducting ambitions. He assembled young, talented musicians and soon the first Chamber Orchestra in the former USSR had its inaugural concert in the Small Hall of the Moscow Conservatory on April 2, 1956. The Orchestra debuted at the Bath Festival organized in England in 1962.

The Moscow Chamber Orchestra became the most traveled classical music ensemble in the former Soviet Union and toured the world from Eastern Europe to Canada and the United States and from Japan to South America.

The MCO performed 18th-century music by composers such as Mozart and Haydn, and contemporary music: its recording of Mozart's symphonies was the first to observe all the notated repeats.

Many composers dedicated their compositions to the Moscow Chamber Orchestra, such as Dmitri Shostakovich, Revol Bunin, Mieczysław Weinberg, Boris Tchaikovsky and many others. The Orchestra performed many world-premiers of contemporary compositions, such as Dmitri Shostakovich's Symphony No.14, in Leningrad, on September 29, 1969.

World-famous musicians performed and recorded with the Orchestra: Yehudi Menuhin, Sviatoslav Richter, David Oistrakh, Emil Gilels, Leonid Kogan, Malcolm Frager, to name a few. Following Barshai’s emigration to the West in 1977, Igor Semyonovich Bezrodny (Russian: Игорь Семёнович Безродный) was appointed a new conductor and an artistic director of the Orchestra. He led the Orchestra until 1981. For the next 10 years Moscow Chamber Orchestra was led by Victor Tretiakov, then Andrei Korsakov.

Constantin Orbelian was appointed a new conductor in 1991; he was succeeded by Alexei Utkin (Russian: Алексей Уткин), in 2010.
