= Norrköping Symphony Orchestra =

Swedish symphony orchestra

- Orchestra
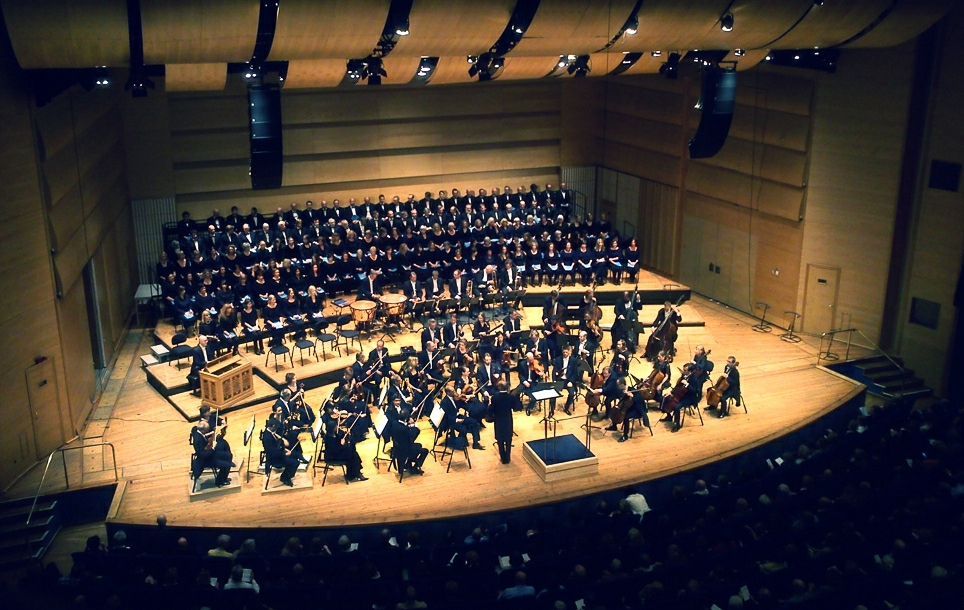
- The orchestra in 2013
- Founded: 1912
- Concert hall: De Geerhallen
- Principal conductor: Karl-Heinz Steffens
- Website: www.norrkopingssymfoniorkester.se/english

The Norrköping Symphony Orchestra (Swedish: Norrköpings Symfoniorkester) is a Swedish professional symphony orchestra. It is based at the concert hall De Geerhallen, in the center of the city Norrköping.

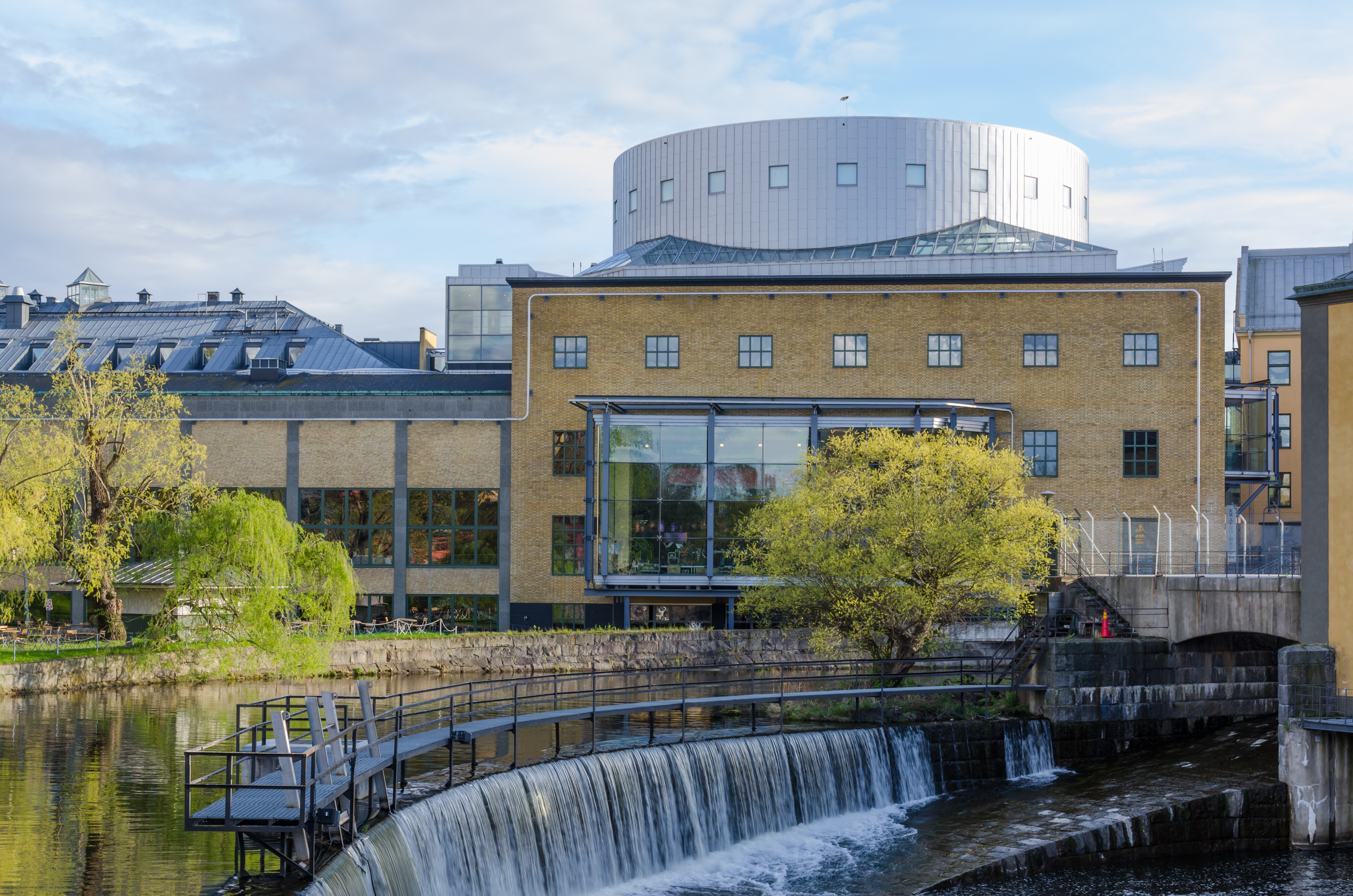
Louis de Geer Concert Hall 2012.

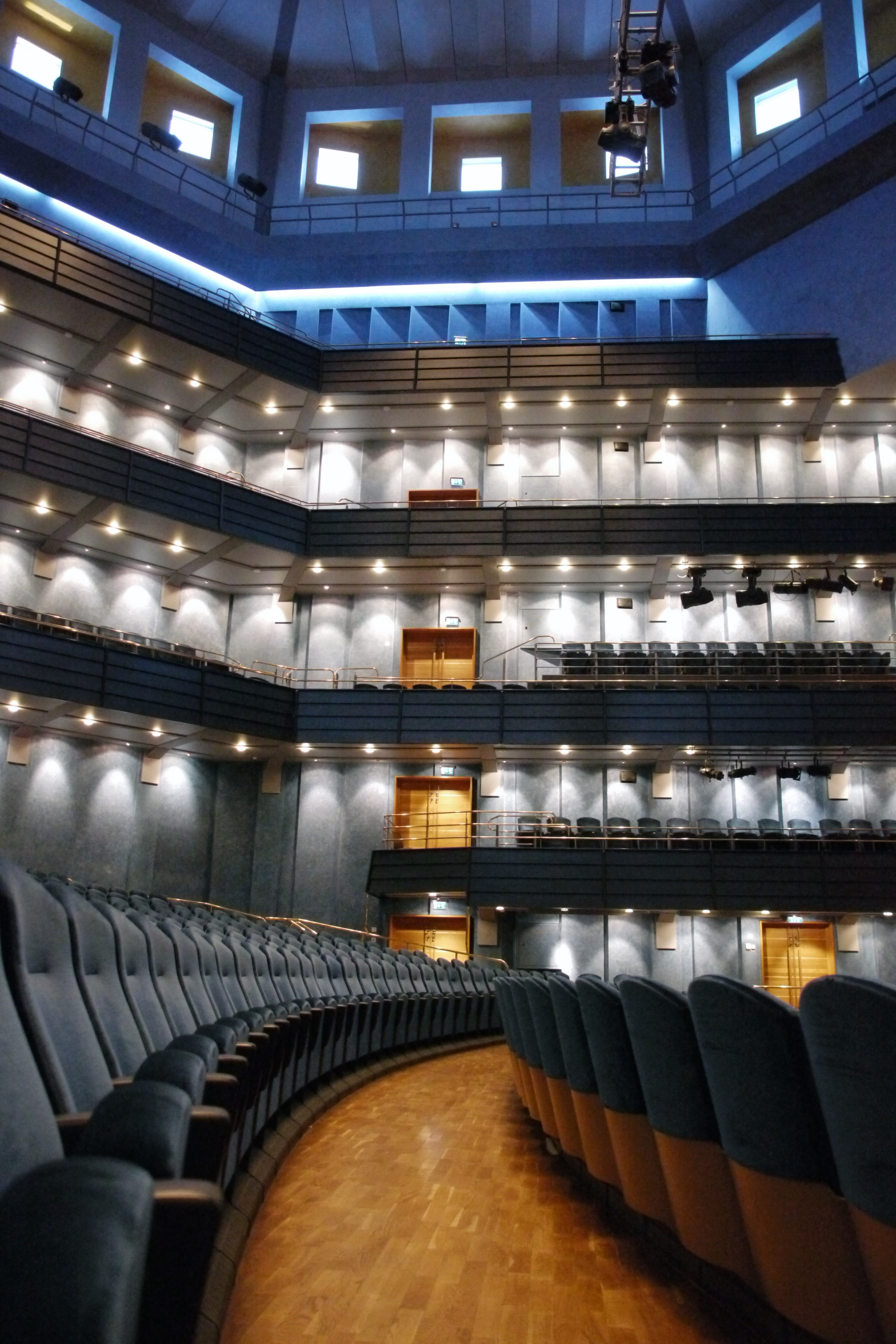
Louis de Geer Concert Hall

== History ==
The orchestra was founded in 1912, and currently consists of 85 musicians. The orchestra also performs several times a year in the nearby city of Linköping.

Past principal conductors have included Herbert Blomstedt and Franz Welser-Möst. Michael Francis was the orchestra's most recent chief conductor, from 2012 to 2016. Past principal guest conductors have included Leif Segerstam (1995–1997), Daniel Harding, Josep Caballé-Domenech, and Stefan Solyom. In October 2019, the orchestra announced the appointment of Karl-Heinz Steffens as its next principal conductor and artistic advisor, effective with the 2020–2021 season.

The orchestra has recorded for the BIS, CPO, Denon and Simax labels, including symphonies by Peterson-Berger, complete works for piano and orchestra by Beethoven, and works by John Pickard.

== Venues ==
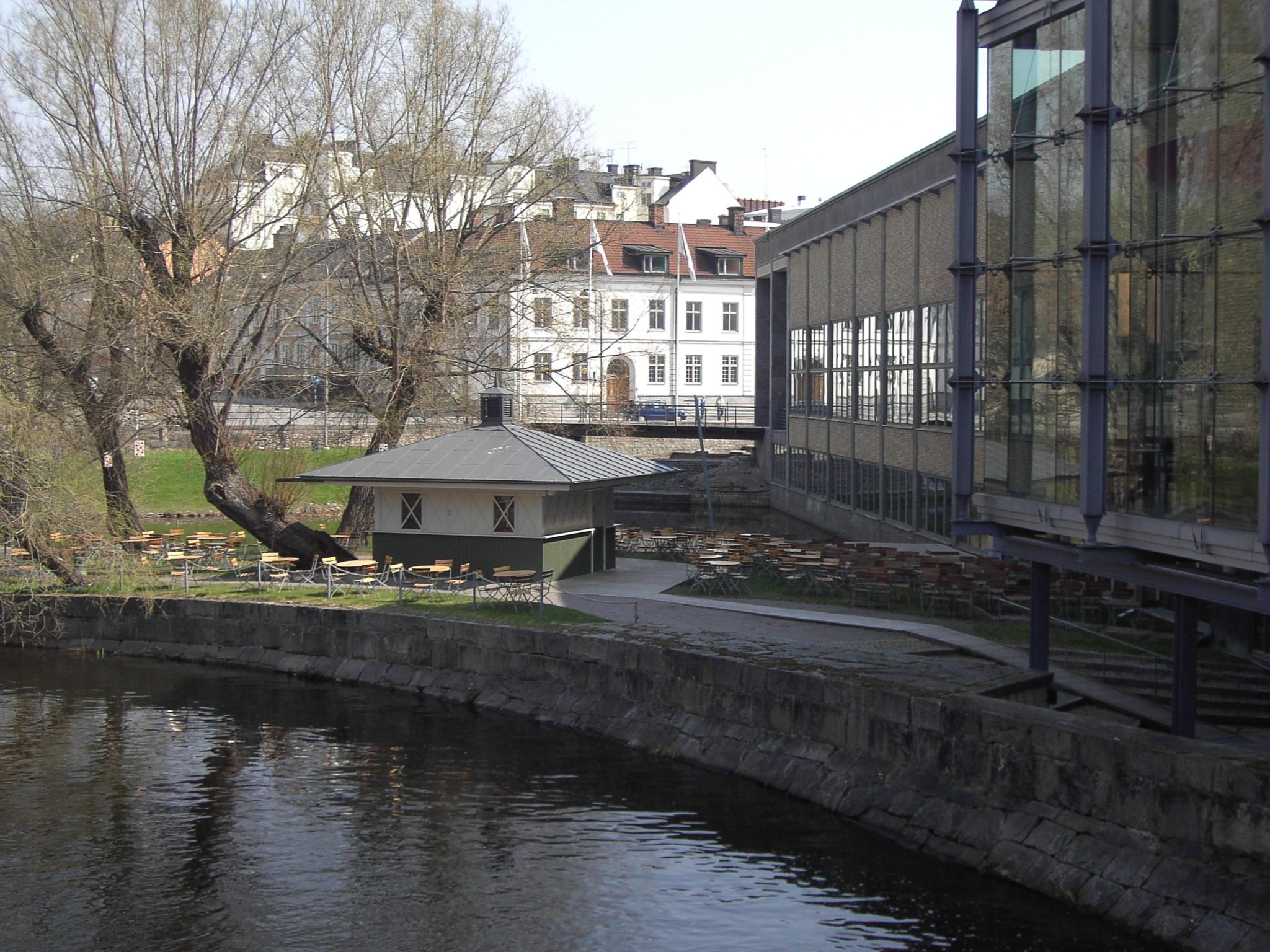
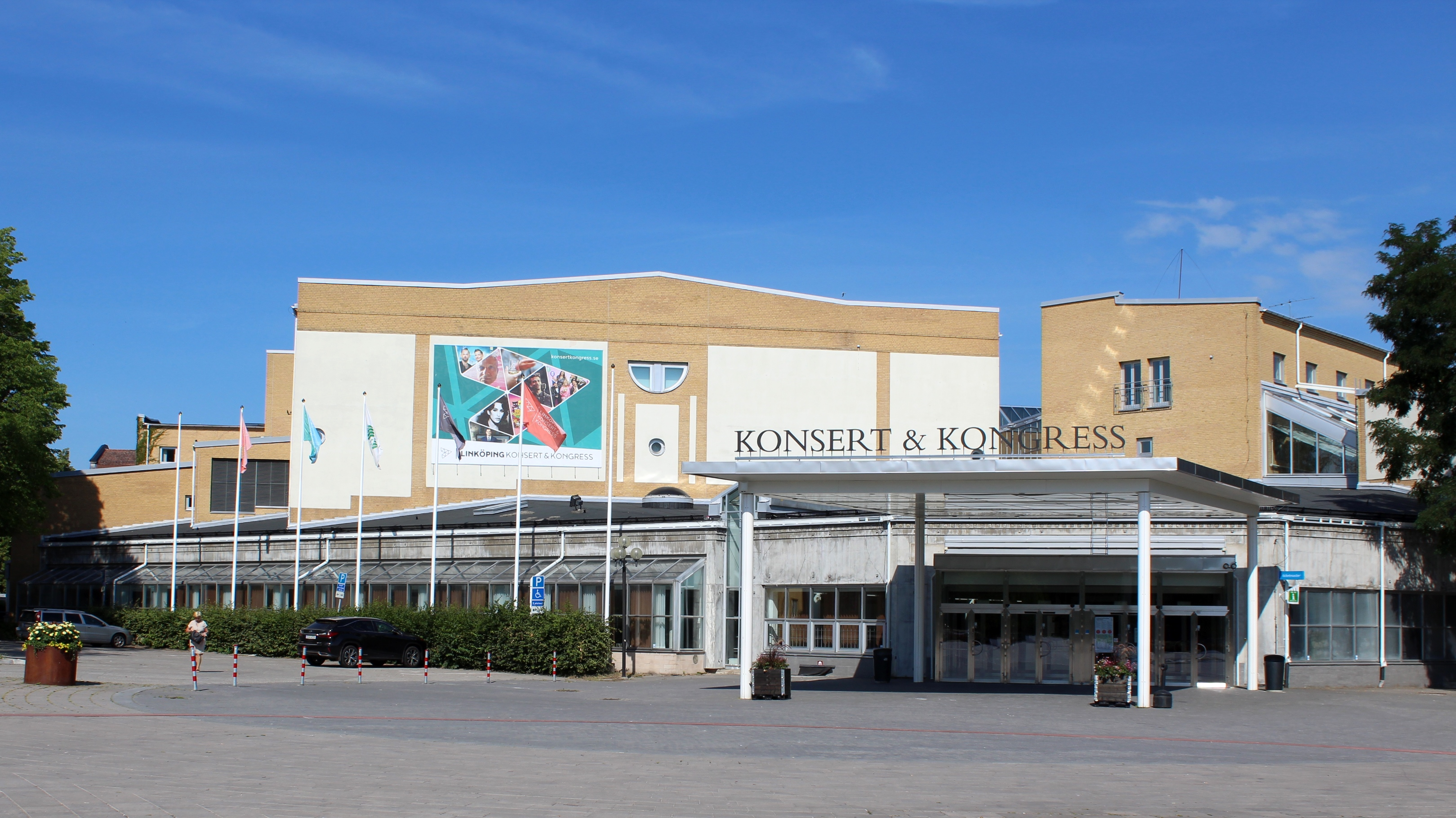
Louis de Geer konsert & kongress

Norrköping, Sweden

Linköping konsert & kongress

Linköping, Sweden

== Principal conductors ==
- Ivar Hellman (1914–1928)
- Tord Benner (1929–1935)
- Heinz Freudenthal (1936–1952)
- Herbert Blomstedt (1954–1962)
- Everett Lee (1962–1972)
- Okko Kamu (1972–1979)
- Vacant (1979–1986)
- Franz Welser-Möst (1986–1991)
- Junichi Hirokami (1991–1996)
- Ole Kristian Ruud (1996–1999)
- Lü Jia (1999–2005)
- Alan Buribayev (2006–2011)
- Michael Francis (2012–2016)
- Karl-Heinz Steffens (2020–present)
