= The Florida Orchestra =

Orchestra in Tampa Bay, Florida, U.S.

- symphony orchestra
- Short name: TFO
- Former name: Florida Gulf Coast Symphony
- Founded: 1968 (58 years ago)
- Location: St. Petersburg, Florida, U.S. (administration office) orchestra serves Tampa Bay Area
- Concert hall: David A. Straz Jr. Center for the Performing Arts, Tampa; Mahaffey Theater, St. Petersburg; Ruth Eckerd Hall, Clearwater
- Music director: Michael Francis
- Website: floridaorchestra.org
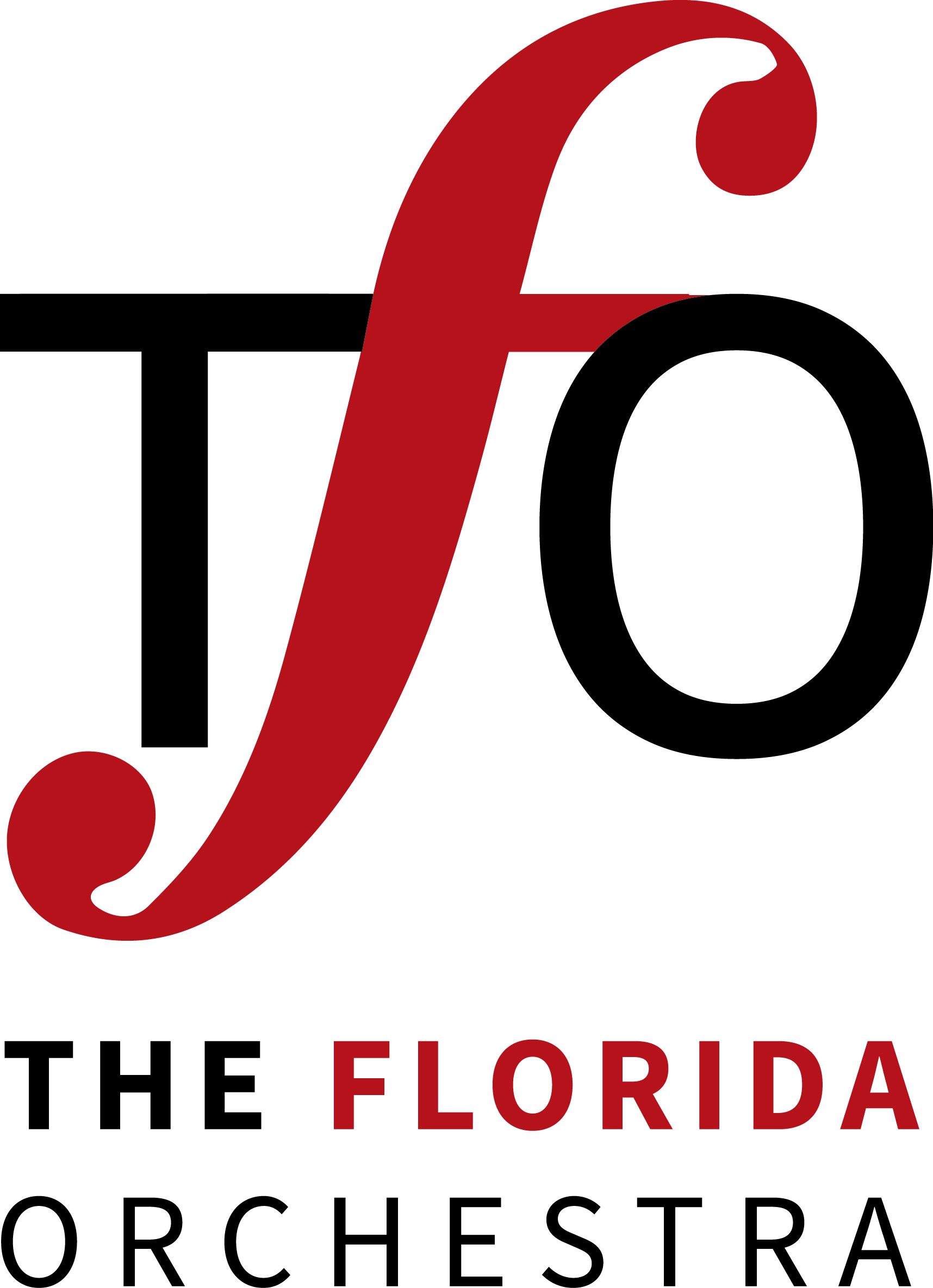

The Florida Orchestra is an American orchestra based in the Tampa Bay tri-city area of Tampa, Clearwater and St. Petersburg, Florida.

It was founded as the Florida Gulf Coast Symphony upon the 1968 merger of the St. Petersburg Symphony Orchestra and the Tampa Philharmonic. The present name was adopted in 1984.

The Florida Orchestra gives some 100 concerts yearly. Series include the "Tampa Bay Times Masterworks," "Raymond James Pops," "Coffee Concerts," "Rock Concerts," and the free "Pops in the Park" and "Youth Concerts."

== History and operations ==
The Florida Orchestra's history is steeped in orchestral tradition from both sides of Tampa Bay. In the 1930s, Tampa already had a strong orchestra scene with a Works Progress Administration (WPA) orchestra, and by the mid-1940s, the Tampa Symphony Orchestra was born, although it would be renamed the Tampa Philharmonic in 1959. Similarly, across the bay in St. Petersburg, community and city orchestras had already formed by the mid-to-late 1940s, and in 1950, members of the Carreno Music Club formed the St. Petersburg Symphony.

Talks of the two orchestras merging began to surface in 1964. Instrumental in these talks were the conductors of the two orchestras – Alfredo Antonini of the Tampa Philharmonic and Thomas Briccetti of the St. Petersburg Symphony.

An official intent of the merger was made on November 23, 1966, and on that day, representatives from both the Tampa Philharmonic and the St. Petersburg Symphony traveled by boat to the center of Tampa Bay, where they married the two institutions in a symbolic union and became the Florida Gulf Coast Symphony. The St. Petersburg Times, now known as the Tampa Bay Times, noted in an article on November 24, 1966, "The mood was one of pride for the entire Tampa Bay area, not one city over another."

The merger became official two years later, and the Florida Gulf Coast Symphony opened its first season on November 14, 1968, under the baton of 43-year-old music director Irwin Hoffman, who had previously guest-conducted the Tampa Philharmonic. The program included Berlioz's Overture to Benvenuto Cellini, Respighi's Pines of Rome, and Shostakovich's Symphony No. 5, Op. 47. That first season, the Florida Gulf Coast Symphony presented five concerts from November through April, performing each concert three times.

The orchestra continued to perform as the Florida Gulf Coast Symphony until its name was changed to The Florida Orchestra in 1984.

== Chief executive officers ==
- John L. Hyer (1991–1994)
- Kathryn Holm (1994–1999)
- Leonard Stone (2000–2007)
- Michael Pastreich (2007–2018)
- Mark Cantrell (2019–2023)
- Ignacio Barrón Viela (since 2023)

== Music directors ==
- Irwin Hoffman (1968–1987)
- Jahja Ling (1988–2002)
- Stefan Sanderling (2003–2012)
- Michael Francis (2015–2030)

The first music director of the orchestra was Irwin Hoffman, from 1968 to 1987.

During the 1988–89 season, Jahja Ling made his debut as music director to tremendous critical acclaim. Ling brought the orchestra into the international spotlight as he led them in the performance of the U.S. national anthem with Whitney Houston at Super Bowl XXV before a worldwide audience of 750 million. The Florida Orchestra made musical history as the first symphony orchestra to ever be invited to perform at a Super Bowl. The 2001–02 season marked Jahja Ling's final season as music director of The Florida Orchestra.

In May 2002, Stefan Sanderling was appointed music director. In the summer of 2012, Sanderling's departure from The Florida Orchestra was announced. His contract had been intended to run through the 2013–2014 season, at which point he was scheduled to conclude his tenure. There were reports of conflict between Sanderling and the orchestra management as factors in his departure. However, in June 2012, the orchestra announced the early conclusion of Sanderling's Florida Orchestra tenure after the 2011–2012 season, at which time he took the titles of conductor emeritus and artistic adviser to the orchestra.

In past years, the orchestra has had as its principal pops conductor Skitch Henderson (1987–2000) and Richard Kaufman (2004–2009).

In June 2012, the orchestra named Jeff Tyzik its new principal pops conductor, effective with the 2012–2013 season, with an initial contract of three years. Also in June 2012, the orchestra named Stuart Malina as its principal guest conductor, effective with the 2012–2013 season.

In June 2014, the orchestra announced the appointment of Michael Francis as its new music director starting with the 2015–2016 season, serving as music director designate for the 2014–2015 season. Appointed as part of an initial three-year contract, his contract was extended in 2018 to run through the 2025 season, before being extended again in 2024 to run through at least the 2029–2030 season. His duties include being the primary conductor and providing the artistic leadership for concert programming and related artistic decisions. Although his primary role is with the Tampa Bay Times Masterworks series, he will also be conducting one concert each season for the Raymond James Pops and the morning Coffee Concert series.

== Venues ==
The three main venues are:

- David A. Straz Jr. Center for the Performing Arts, Tampa
- Mahaffey Theater, St. Petersburg
- Ruth Eckerd Hall, Clearwater

Some, but not all, concerts are performed at all three main venues. A series of chamber concerts is held at the Woodson African American Museum of Florida, located in St. Petersburg. Certain concerts are performed at other locations.

== Accessibility Initiative ==
In the fall of 2011, The Florida Orchestra announced its Accessibility Initiative, which effectively reduced ticket prices to all of its Masterworks and Pops concerts. Due to this initiative, as well as the programming on the 2011–2012 season, the orchestra saw a marked growth in subscriptions and single tickets, with a combined increase in paid attendance of fifteen percent.

== Partnership with the Tampa Bay Lightning ==
The orchestra collaborated with local NHL hockey team, the Tampa Bay Lightning, to produce the team's new theme song, Be the Thunder. The anthem, composed by Gregory Smith, was accompanied by video footage of the Lightning and The Florida Orchestra as the hockey team took the ice at every home game at the Tampa Bay Times Forum during the 2011–2012 season. In addition to the Lightning's new song, the orchestra worked with the hockey team to create a variety of youth concerts for children in Pinellas and Hillsborough counties during the 2011–2012 school year. Featuring TFO musicians, Lightning players, and even Lightning mascot Thunderbug as conductor, the youth concerts focused on how teamwork is involved with both hockey and music.

== Cultural exchange with Cuba ==
Also in 2011, the orchestra launched a multi-year cultural exchange with Cuba. After several months of communications with Cuba's Music Institute of Havana (Instituto de Música de La Habana), The Florida Orchestra Wind Quintet performed in Havana at the end of September 2011, which was the first time since 1999 that a professional American orchestra had sent musicians to Cuba and only the second time since the 1959 revolution.

The cultural exchange continued in November 2012, when The Florida Orchestra presented the National Symphony Orchestra of Cuba as part of a Tampa Bay area residency that included chamber music, an orchestra concert and master classes.

In May 2013, concertmaster Jeffrey Multer performed as soloist with the National Symphony Orchestra of Cuba while in Havana.

== Recordings ==
The orchestra released its CD on the Naxos label in the fall of 2012 featuring music by Florida-influenced classical composer Frederick Delius. The recording includes The Florida Orchestra, the Master Chorale of Tampa Bay, and baritone Leon Williams in a performance of Delius's Sea Drift and Appalachia. In 2014, the orchestra released another CD, Holiday Pops Live!, on its label, TFO Live!

== Contract negotiations ==
In 2003, the orchestra musicians ratified a contract that cut their pay by sixteen percent, after the prior season had reported a fiscal deficit. There was also a plan to increase the orchestra's endowment from $8 million to $25 million. However, the planned announcement of the campaign did not occur by early 2004. Seven musicians from the orchestra left as a result.

In November 2006, the orchestra reported a deficit of $676,615 for the 2006 fiscal year.

The orchestra signed a contract in June 2012, with a base salary of $29,034 (for twenty-five weeks of work) that increased to $32,000 for 27 1/2 weeks in the 2014–2015 season. The three-year contract was ratified in the summer of 2022 and was to cover through to the 2024–25 season. It provided for a twelve-percent raise for musicians over the life of the contract (five percent in year one, four percent in year two, three percent in year three), an additional week of paid vacation, and was to increase the duration of the orchestra season to thirty-nine weeks by the end of the agreement.

On March 28, 2025, the orchestra announced that a new four-year contract had been signed. It reduced health-insurance costs, added more paid parental leave, increased salary, and updated the audition process, along with other changes. The contract took effect on September 1, 2025, and will expire on August 31, 2029.

== See also ==
- List of symphony orchestras in the United States
- Music of Florida
