= Michael Francis (conductor) =

British conductor

Michael Francis (born 1976) is a British conductor.

== Biography ==
Francis learnt the double bass as a youth. He was a member of the European Union Youth Orchestra, and graduated in 1997 from the Cardiff University School of Music. He played the double bass for the London Symphony Orchestra before he began conducting. His first public performance as conductor of a major orchestra occurred in January 2007 when he deputised for Valery Gergiev.

In Europe, Francis became chief conductor and artistic adviser to the Norrköping Symphony Orchestra in 2012, and held the post through 2016. In December 2016, Francis first guest-conducted the Staatsphilharmonie Rheinland-Pfalz. In December 2018, the Staatsphilharmonie Rheinland-Pfalz announced the appointment of Francis as its next chief conductor, effective with the 2019-2020 season, with an initial contract of 5 years. In March 2023, the orchestra announced a five-year extension of Francis' contract as chief conductor with the Staatsphilharmonie Rheinland-Pfalz.

In the USA, Francis became music director of The Florida Orchestra as of the 2015-2016 season, with an initial contract of 3 years. He received a contract extension to remain with The Florida Orchestra through 2025. In February 2024, it was announced that Francis received an additional contract extension and would remain with The Florida Orchestra through at least the 2029-2030 season. He became music director of the Mainly Mozart Festival (San Diego, California, US) in the summer of 2015.

Francis lives in Florida with his American wife Cindy and their daughter.

Cultural offices
Preceded by Alan Buribayev	Principal Conductor, Norrköping Symphony Orchestra; 2012–2016	Succeeded by Karl-Heinz Steffens
Preceded by Stefan Sanderling	Music Director, Florida Orchestra; 2015–present	Succeeded by incumbent
Preceded by Karl-Heinz Steffens	Principal Conductor, Staatsphilharmonie Rheinland-Pfalz; 2019–present	Succeeded by incumbent
