= Het Brabants Orkest =

Dutch symphony orchestra

- Orchestra
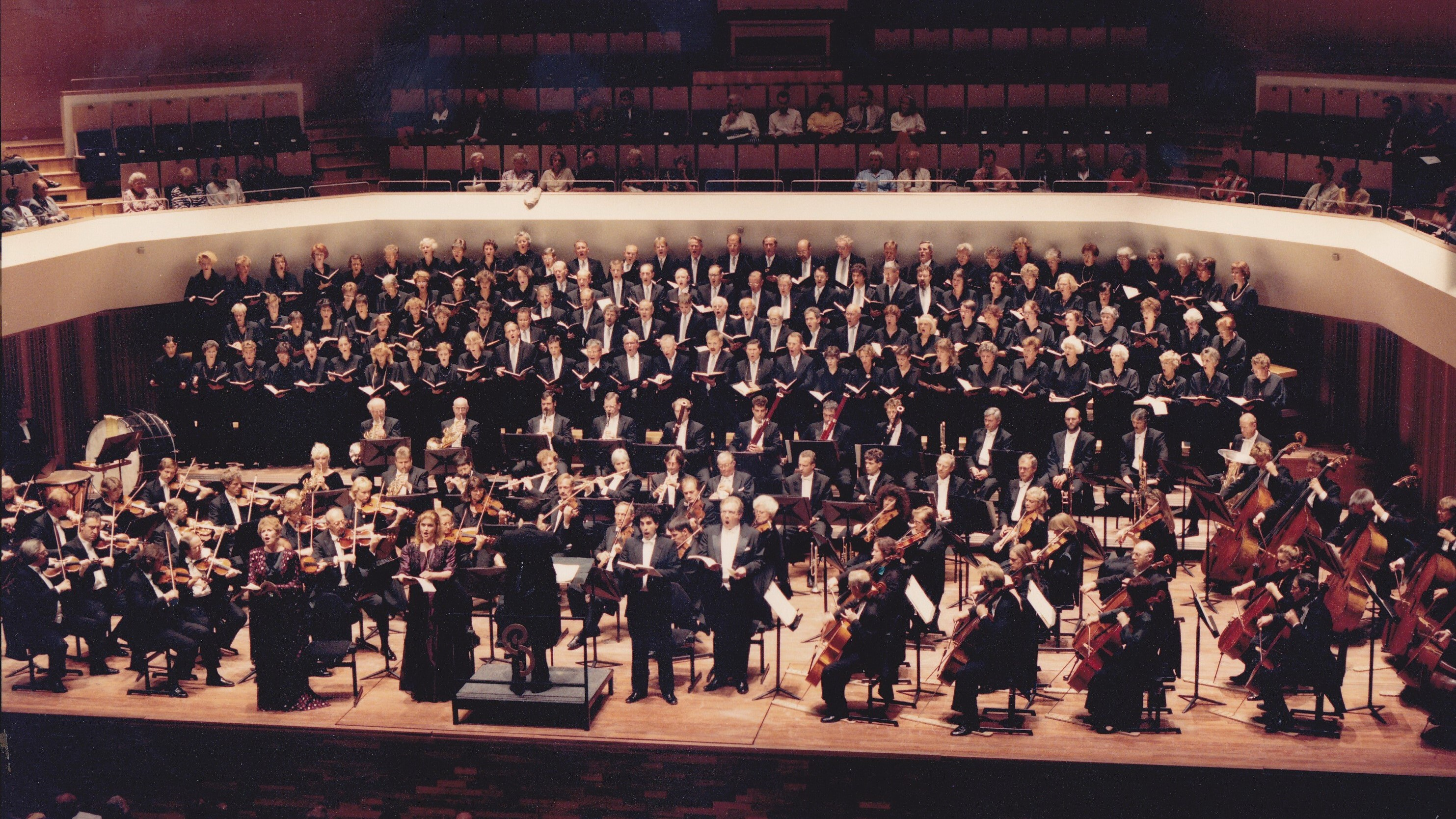
- Founded: 1947
- Disbanded: 2013
- Location: Eindhoven, Netherlands
- Principal conductor: Alan Buribayev

Het Brabants Orkest (literal translation, The Brabant Orchestra, also known as The Europa Orchestra) was a Dutch symphony orchestra, based in the province of North Brabant. Its principal concert venue was the Muziekgebouw Frits Philips in Eindhoven. The orchestra also gave concerts at the Theater aan de Parade in 's-Hertogenbosch, the Concertzaal (concert hall) in Tilburg, and the Chassé Theatre in Breda.

The roots of the orchestra date to 1947, with the establishment of the Stichting Vrienden van het Orkest (Friends' Orchestra Foundation) by the province of North Brabant, to generate support for the formation of a full-time and full-sized symphony orchestra in the province. The full orchestra was formally established in 1949, at a size of 40 musicians, with Hein Jordans as its first chief conductor. Jordans held the chief conductorship from 1949 to 1979.

Other chief conductors have included Lucas Vis (1979-1983), André Vandernoot, and Arpad Joó. In 1994, the orchestra dismissed Joó and subsequently named Marc Soustrot its next chief conductor. However, controversy arose when the orchestra had appointed Jaap van Zweden as principal guest conductor, to the point where Soustrot had threatened not to take the chief conductorship because he did not feel sufficiently consulted on the van Zweden appointment. The controversy was resolved, and Soustrot served as chief conductor of the orchestra from 1996 to 2006. From 2008 to 2012, Alan Buribayev was the orchestra's chief conductor.

The orchestra participated as accompanying ensemble in the Internationaal Vocalisten Concours, concerts of the Stichting Stabat Mater in Oirschot, "Carnaval Concerts", the Festival Cult & Tumult in Veldhoven and the "Festival Traces" in Tilburg. The orchestra also served as the accompanying ensemble in opera productions by Opera Zuid.

Following elimination of government grants, Het Brabants Orkest merged in April 2013 with the Limburgs Symfonie Orkest to form the South Netherlands Philharmonic.

== Chief conductors ==
- Hein Jordans (1949–1979)
- Lucas Vis (1979–1983)
- André Vandernoot
- Arpad Joó (?–1994)
- Marc Soustrot (1996–2006)
- Alan Buribayev (2008–2012)
