= Staatsphilharmonie Rheinland-Pfalz =

German symphony orchestra

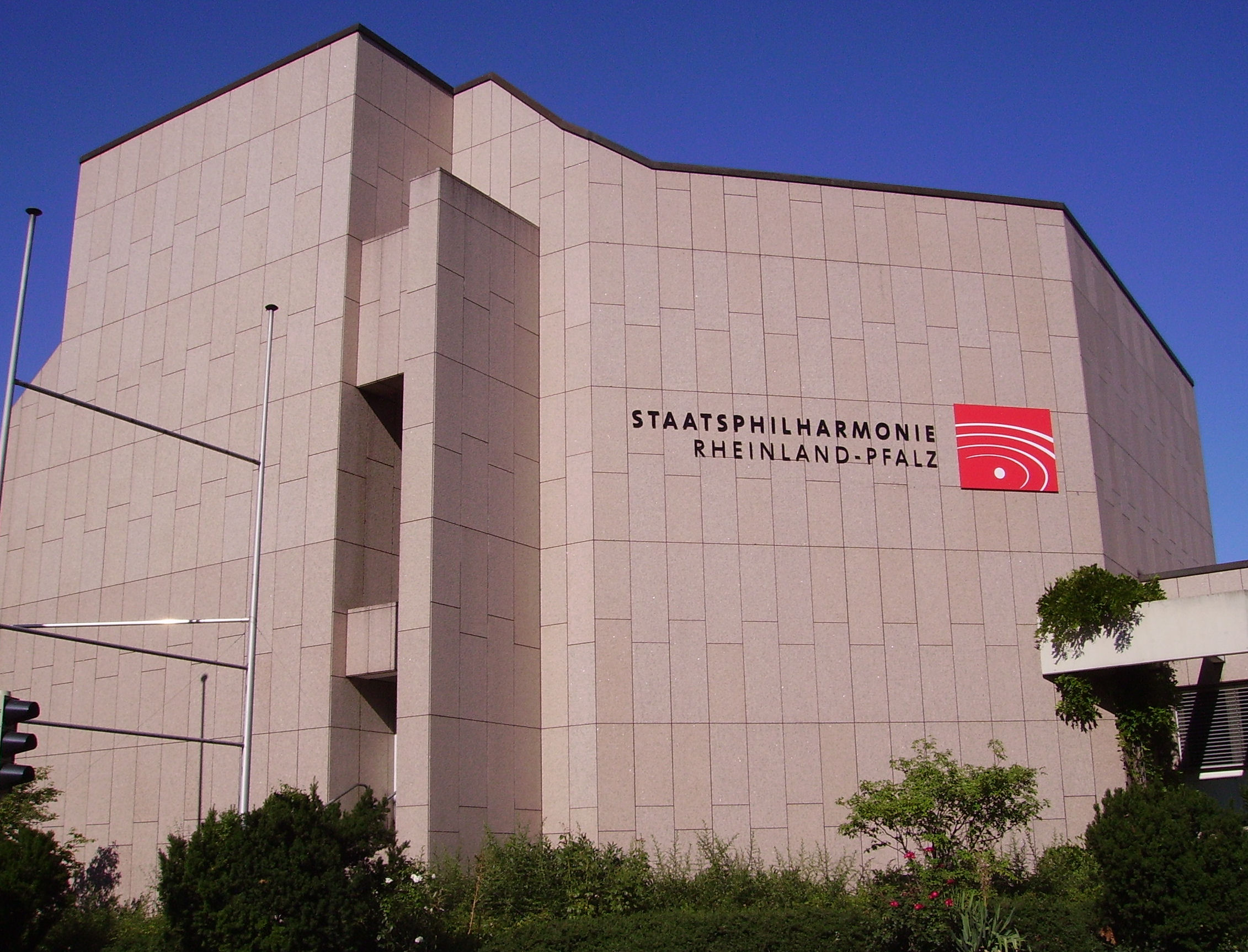
Orchestra house in Ludwigshafen, Germany

The Deutsche Staatsphilharmonie Rheinland-Pfalz (German State Philharmonic of Rhineland-Palatinate) is a German orchestra based in the German state of Rhineland-Palatinate, in Ludwigshafen am Rhein. The orchestra performs concerts principally at the Ludwigshafen Philharmonie.

== History ==
In 1919, the orchestra was founded as the Landes-Sinfonie-Orchester für Pfalz und Saarland ('State Symphony Orchestra for Palatinate and Saarland'). In 1923, the orchestra was reorganised into a GMbH under the name Pfalzorchester. The orchestra changed its name in 1933 to Saarpfalzorchester, and subsequently to Landessymphonieorchester Westmark in 1941, holding the latter name to 1944. In 1967, the orchestra took the name Philharmonisches Orchester der Pfalz.

In 1974, the state of Rhineland-Palatinate took over sponsorship of the orchestra in place of the orchestra association, with a change in the orchestra's name to Pfälzische Philharmonie, Staatsorchester Rheinland-Pfalz. During the tenure of Christoph Eschenbach as chief conductor, the orchestra acquired the name of Staatsphilharmonie Rheinland-Pfalz. In 1985, during the tenure of Leif Segerstam as chief conductor, the orchestra took up residence in the Philharmonie in Ludwigshafen am Rhein. On 1 January 1998, the orchestra was formally transformed into a state operation. The orchestra acquired its current name of Deutsche Staatsphilharmonie Rheinland-Pfalz on 1 January 2007.

In December 2016, Michael Francis first guest-conducted the orchestra. In December 2018, the orchestra announced the appointment of Francis as its next chief conductor, effective with the 2019–2020 season, with an initial contract of 5 years. In March 2023, the orchestra announced a five-year extension of Francis' contract as chief conductor.

== Chief conductors ==
- Lewis Ruth (1919–1920)
- Ernst Boehe (1920–1938)
- Karl Friderich (1939–1943)
- Franz Konwitschny (1943–1944)
- Heinz Bongartz (1944)
- Karl Maria Zwißler (1946–1947)
- Bernhard Conz (1947–1951)
- Karl Rucht (1951–1957)
- Otmar Suitner (1957–1960)
- Christoph Stepp (1960–1978)
- Christoph Eschenbach (1978–1983)
- Leif Segerstam (1983–1990)
- Bernhard Klee (1992–1997)
- Theodor Guschlbauer (1997–2001)
- Ari Rasilainen (2002–2009)
- Karl-Heinz Steffens (2009–2018)
- Michael Francis (2019–present)
