= Chautauqua Symphony Orchestra =

American orchestra

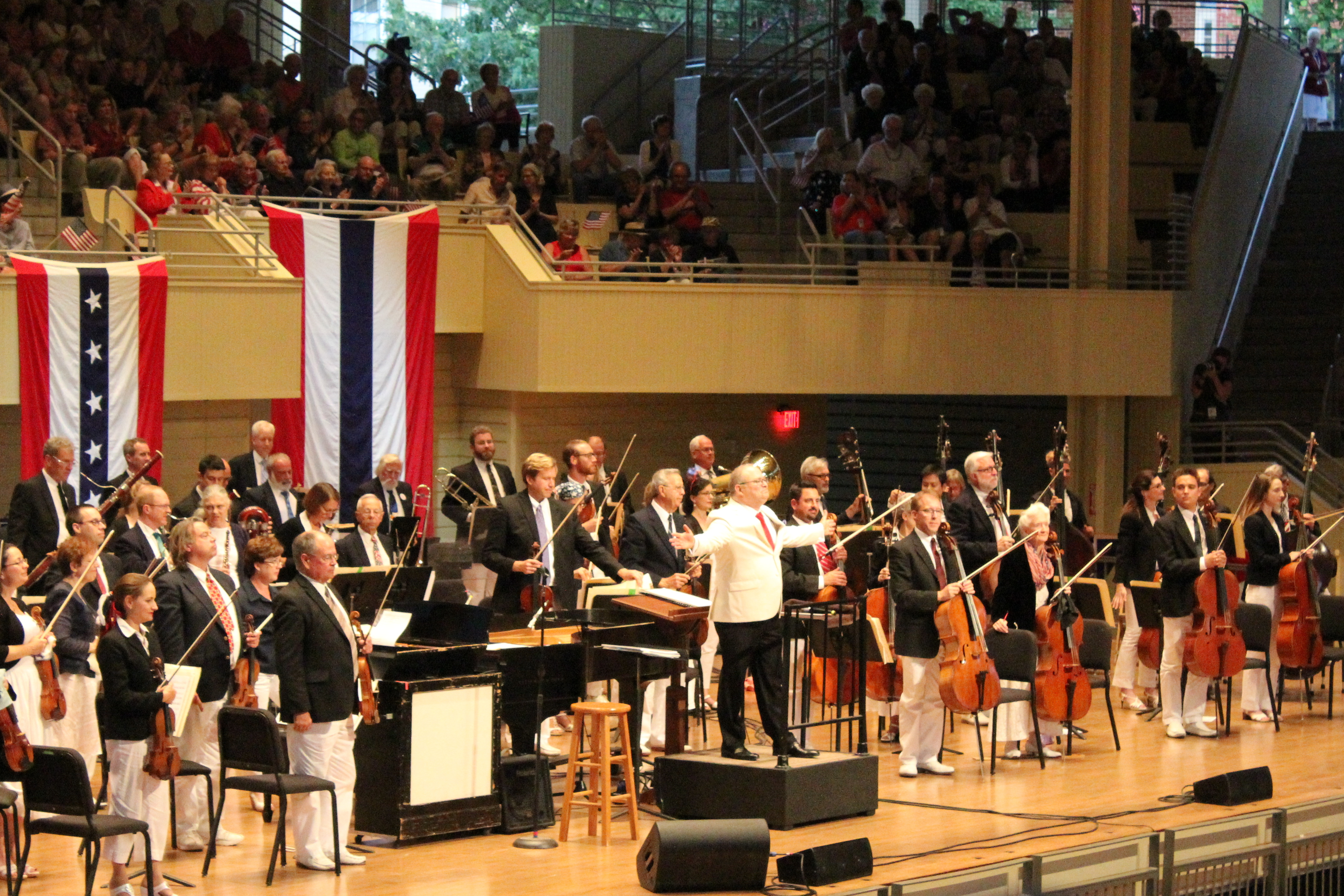
Stuart Chafetz conducts the Chautauqua Symphony Orchestra on the fourth of July.

The Chautauqua Symphony Orchestra (CSO) is an American orchestra, and the resident summer orchestra of the Chautauqua Institution in western New York State. Founded in 1929 (96 years ago), the ensemble plays concerts on most Tuesday, Thursday, and Saturday nights throughout the Institution's nine-week summer season, in the Amphitheater of the facility. The CSO draws its members principally from US professional orchestras. In addition to standard concerts, the CSO also accompanies programs with the Chautauqua Ballet Company and the Chautauqua Opera Young Artists.

In 1903, Henry B. Vincent, the institution's assistant music director, formed an initial in-house orchestra of 21 musicians. The New York Symphony Orchestra gave concerts at the institution as a visiting ensemble between 1909 and 1929. In 1929, the institution formally established the Chautauqua Symphony Orchestra as its resident orchestra, with Albert Stoessel as its first music director of the orchestra, from 1929 through his death in 1943. Simultaneously, Stossel directed opera activities and the school of music at Chautauqua. Successors to Stossel included Franco Autori (1943–1953) and Walter Hendl (1953–1972), the latter the longest-serving music director of the ensemble.

Since July 2015, the music director is Rossen Milanov, whom the Chautauqua Institution appointed to the post in October 2014. In September 2015, the Chautauqua Institution announced the extension of Milanov's contract through 2019.

== Music directors ==
- Albert Stoessel (1929–1943)
- Franco Autori (1943–1953)
- Walter Hendl (1953–1972)
- Sergiu Comissiona (1977–1980)
- Varujan Kojian (1980–1984)
- Joseph Silverstein (1986–1990)
- Uri Segal (1990–2007)
- Stefan Sanderling (2007–2010)
- Rossen Milanov (2015–present)
