= Chautauqua Opera =

Summer opera company in New York, US

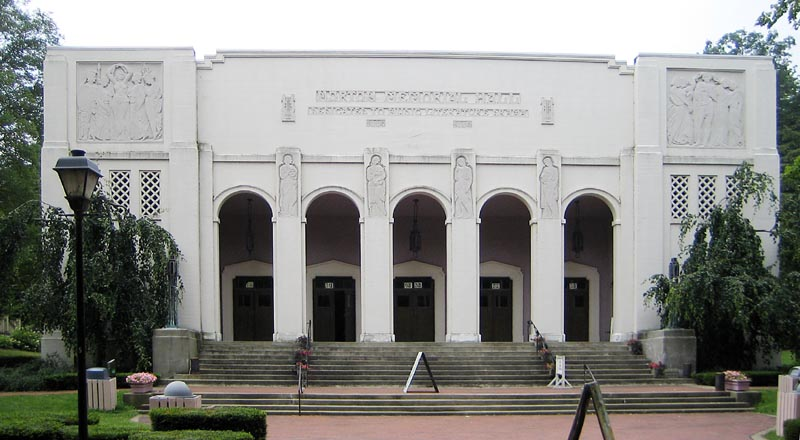
Norton Memorial Hall, home of the Chautauqua Opera

The Chautauqua Opera is the resident summer opera company of the Chautauqua Institution in Chautauqua, New York. It is one of the oldest continuously active summer opera companies in the U.S., having been founded in 1929 as the Chautauqua Opera Association, and it has produced several operas during the Institution's nine-week summer season every year since. Generally opera productions are performed in English in Norton Memorial Hall, usually on specific Monday and Friday evenings throughout the season. Recently, however, Chautauqua opera has increasingly been performed in concert productions at the Chautauqua Amphitheater.

The first production director of the company was Alfredo Valenti, who began Chautauqua's rich opera tradition with Flotow's "Martha" on July 19, 1929. Henry Ford and Mrs. Thomas A. Edison were in the audience. Valenti, who served as director for twenty-eight years, championed young American singers such as Rose Bampton, who performed that season and in 1930 and who, like many other stars at Norton Hall (such as Charles Kullman and Helen Jepson) went on to fame at the Metropolitan Opera and elsewhere. Currently, the Chautauqua Opera is under the general direction of Jay Lesenger. The 2014 season included performances of Puccini's Madama Butterfly and Moore's The Ballad of Baby Doe. The former was performed at the Amphitheater, along with two "pops" concerts; "The Ballad of Baby Doe" was performed at Norton Hall. This indicates a significant contraction of opera productions, which require substantial resources to rehearse and put on, and also suggests that Norton Hall is becoming less of the home for opera at Chautauqua; this pattern was repeated in 2015, with Verdi's Macbeth performed at the Amphitheater, and Tchaikovsky's Eugene Onegin performed at Norton Hall. In contrast, there were six separate productions at Norton Hall during the 1967 season.

In addition, the Chautauqua Opera runs the Young Artists Program, training highly talented young singers who plan to pursue careers in operatic music. Members of the Young Artists program present recitals on Thursday afternoons at the Institution's Hall of Christ, as well as two concerts with the Chautauqua Symphony Orchestra, and two revue performances during the summer season.

== See also ==
- List of opera festivals
