= Walter Barshai =

Russian writer

Walter Barshai (né Vladimir Rudolfovich Barshai, Владимир Рудольфович Баршай; born 1955) is an author, painter, scientist and humanitarian, and the founder of the Tairus Research and Production facility within the Russian Academy of Sciences in Novosibirsk, Russia.

Barshai was born in Russia, a son of a famed musician, Rudolf Barshai (1924-2010) and painter, Anna Martinson (1928-2012), daughter of a famed Russian Comic Sergey Martinson, but emigrated to the West in 1972. He is a theoretical physicist and the author of a work on the implications of the uncertainty principle on the spontaneous growth of hydrothermal crystals He was the recipient of an honorary award from the Russian Academy of Sciences for his contribution to Russian science in 2005. He is also a classical music producer, recordings including Mahler 5th Symphony with JDP,"Richter: last Orchestra performance", Brahms, "Zeltser plays Rachmaninoff", Lokshin and a publisher ("Selected Art Works of Anna Martinson", poetry, etc.).
