= Uri Segal =

Israeli musical conductor (born 1944)

Uri Segal אורי סגל
- Born: 7 March 1944 (age 82); Jerusalem, Mandatory Palestine
- Genres: Classical
- Occupation: Conductor
- Education: Jerusalem Academy of Music and Dance, Guildhall School of Music and Drama
- Spouse: Ilana Finkelstein
- Children: 4
- Awards: First Prize, Dimitri Mitropoulos Conducting Competition (1969)

Uri Segal (Hebrew: אורי סגל; born 7 March 1944, Jerusalem) is an Israeli musical conductor.

Segal studied violin and conducting at the Rubin Academy of Music (now the Jerusalem Academy of Music and Dance). From 1966 to 1969, he attended the Guildhall School of Music.

In 1969, shortly after his graduation, Segal won first prize in the Dimitri Mitropolous Conducting Competition in New York City. For a year after this, he served as Leonard Bernstein's assistant with the New York Philharmonic Orchestra.

From 1980 to 1982, Segal was the chief conductor of the Bournemouth Symphony Orchestra. From 1981 to 1985, he was principal conductor of the Philharmonia Hungarica. He has also served as artistic director of the Israel Chamber Orchestra.

In the US, Segal became music director of the Chautauqua Symphony Orchestra in 1990, and held the post through 2007. In 1990, in Osaka, Japan, he founded the Century Orchestra and was its chief conductor through 1998. He subsequently became the Century Orchestra's Laureate Conductor.

Segal married Ilana Finkelstein in 1966. They have three daughters and a son.

Cultural offices
Preceded by Paavo Berglund	Principal Conductor, Bournemouth Symphony Orchestra; 1980–1982	Succeeded by Rudolf Barshai
Preceded by (no predecessor)	Chief Conductor, Century Orchestra; 1990–1998	Succeeded by Ken Takaseki
Preceded by Joseph Silverstein	Music Director, Chautauqua Symphony Orchestra; 1990–2007	Succeeded by Stefan Sanderling
Preceded by Max Bragado-Darman	Music Director, The Louisville Orchestra; 1998–2004	Succeeded by Jorge Mester
