= Tairus =

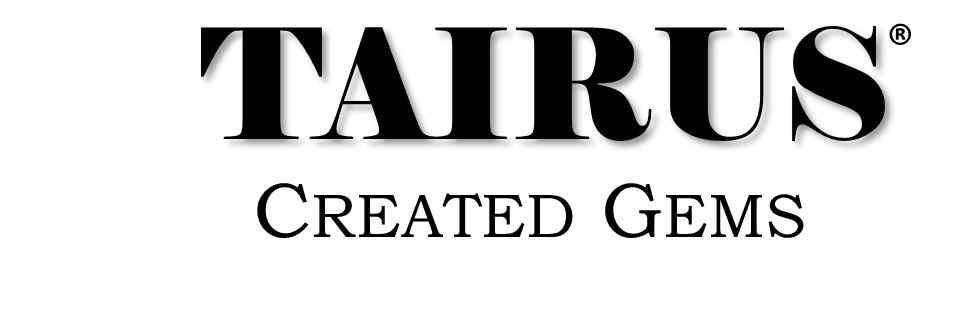
- Industry: gems
- Founded: October 21, 1989; 37 years ago
- Founder: Walter Barshai; Nikolai Dobretsov
- Headquarters: Bangkok, Thailand
- Products: hydrothermal emeralds, alexandrite
- Website: tairus.com

Tairus (Russian: Тайрус, a portmanteau of Тайско (Thai) and Русский (Russian)) is a synthetic gemstone manufacturer. It was formed in 1989 as part of Mikhail Gorbachev's perestroika initiative to establish a joint venture between the Russian Academy of Sciences and Tairus Created Gems Co Ltd. of Bangkok, Thailand. Today Tairus is a major supplier of hydrothermally grown gemstones to the jewelery industry. Later, Tairus became a privately held enterprise, operating out of its Bangkok distribution hub under the trade name Tairus, owned by Tairus Created Gems Co Ltd. of Bangkok, Thailand.

In the beginning, the team was led by the scientist and developer of the hydrothermal process, the late Alexander Lebedev, whose name was kept secret by the Soviet regime for many years, and Walter Barshai, who was appointed to be the Chairman of the Board of the Joint Venture Tairus. Their objective was to grow and to supply emeralds, rubies, sapphires, alexandrite and other gems to the jewelry industry. The driving force was late Academician Nikolai Dobretsov, former President of the Siberian Branch of the Russian Academy of Sciences. Tairus has achieved many scientific breakthroughs. For example, the development of the hydrothermally grown corundum, aquamarine and the development of a revolutionary process of horizontal crystallization for growing corundum (ruby), chrysoberyl and alexandrite.

After many years of development, scientists at Tairus had succeeded to commercially grow emeralds in a laboratory environment that resemble in color and have gemological properties that “overlap natural emeralds from various localities, especially those of low alkali-bearing stones from Colombia” (The Journal of Gemmology, 2006, Vol. 30, Nos 1/2, 59-74).

== Products ==
The following are synthetic gemstones that were developed by Tairus scientists; they are alternately referred to as Tairus stones (e.g. "Tairus Ruby").

- Floating zone ruby, synthesized in 1991 (no longer in production)
- Hydrothermal ruby, synthesized in 1992 by Alexander Dokukin.
- Hydrothermal aquamarine, synthesized in 1993.
- Hydrothermal sapphires, in pink, green, orange, and blue.
- Colombian color emerald, developed in 2004.
