= Rudolf Barshai =

Soviet and Russian conductor (1924–2010)

- Рудольф Борисович Баршай
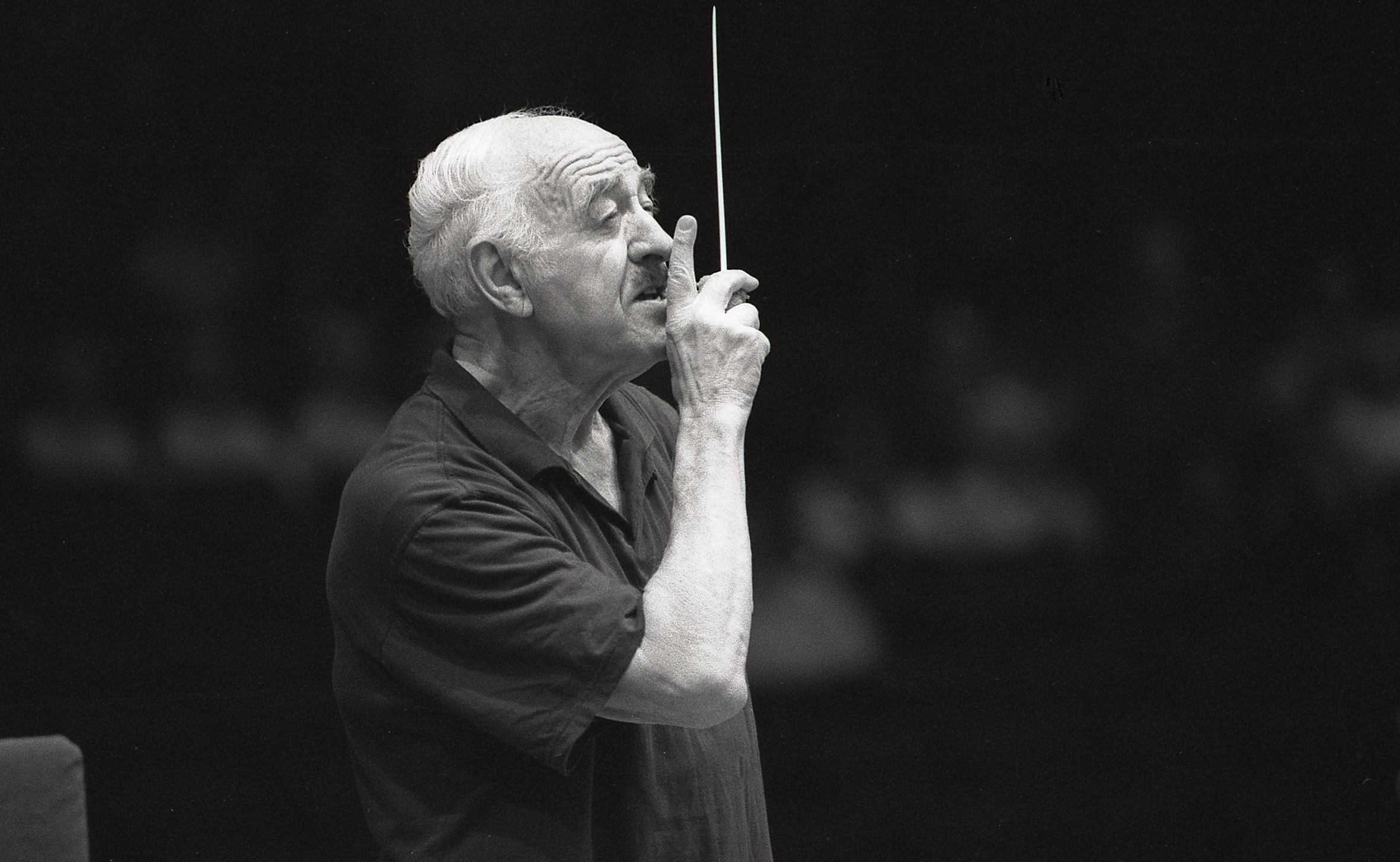
- Born: Rudolf Borisovich Barshai; September 28, 1924; Labinsk, Krasnodar Krai, Russian SFSR, USSR
- Died: November 2, 2010 (aged 86); Basel, Switzerland
- Occupations: violist, conductor, arranger

Rudolf Borisovich Barshai (Russian: Рудольф Борисович Баршай, September 28, 1924 – November 2, 2010) was a Soviet and Russian conductor and violist.

== Life ==
Barshai was born on September 28, 1924, in Labinsk, Krasnodar Krai, Russian SFSR. He studied at the Moscow Conservatory under Lev Tseitlin and Vadim Borisovsky. He performed as a soloist with Sviatoslav Richter and David Oistrakh and as a member of a trio with Mstislav Rostropovich and Leonid Kogan. During his career Barshai won numerous Soviet and international competitions and was the founding violist of the Borodin Quartet in 1945, where he remained a member until 1953. He later studied conducting under Ilya Musin at the Leningrad Conservatory.

In 1955, Barshai founded the Moscow Chamber Orchestra, which he led and conducted until he emigrated to the West in 1977. He was the artistic director of the Israel Chamber Orchestra from 1978 to 1981. From 1981 until 1982, Barshai was principal conductor of Vancouver Symphony Orchestra and the Principal Guest Conductor of Orchestre National de France (National Orchestra of France) from 1985 to 1986. He was also the principal conductor of the Bournemouth Symphony Orchestra from 1982 to 1988 as well as the permanent Guest Conductor in many Orchestras of Europe, Canada, USA, Taiwan, and Japan. Barshai resided in Switzerland until his death in 2010.

Barshai's first wife was Nina Barshai (married 1947, divorced 1953), who became second violinist of the Borodin Quartet. They had a son, Lev Barshai (1946–2014). In 1954, Barshai married Anna Martinson (1928–2012), a Russian painter and costume designer and daughter of the Soviet comic Sergey Martinson. Together they had a son, Walter Barshai, born in 1955. The couple divorced in 1963 and, in 1968, Barshai married Japanese translator Teruko Soda (divorced 1974). They had a son, Takeshi, who was born on January 10, 1967. In 1980, Barshai married harpsichordist and organist Elena Raskova. They lived in Switzerland near Basel, where he was buried.

A biographical film about Barshai, The Note, was made in 2010 by Oleg Dorman. In 2013, the story was featured in the book The Note. In 2015, the English label ICA Classics released A Tribute to Rudolf Barshai, a commemorative 20-CD set of his recordings.

== Work ==
Barshai achieved fame as a musical interpreter and arranger of Shostakovich's and Prokofiev's music. He is particularly noted for his arrangements of Shostakovich's string quartets, especially String Quartet No. 8, for chamber orchestra. In 2000, Barshai produced a performing version of Mahler's Tenth Symphony, which was left unfinished at the composer's death. Also, he recorded many Shostakovich's works, among which was the widely praised world premiere recording of the composer's Fourteenth Symphony. Many of his recordings earned critical acclaim and won international awards, including:

- 1988 Gramophone Awards – Concerto: Tchaikovsky, Piano Concerto No. 2, Rudolf Barshai conducting Bournemouth Symphony Orchestra; solo: Peter Donohoe (with Nigel Kennedy and Steven Isserlis in the slow movement) (EMI)
- 2003 Cannes Classical Music Award: Orchestral 20 Century: Shostakovich: Complete Symphonies; Barshai conducting WDR Symphony Orchestra Cologne (Brilliant Classics)
- 2003 Editor's Award (ClassicsToday.com): Record of the Year: Shostakovich: Complete Symphonies; Barshai (Brilliant Classics).

The Rudolf Barshai International Strings Competition was established in 2020.

== Recordings ==
=== Solo ===
- Ivan Khandoshkin: Concerto for Viola & Orchestra (in C Major). Moscow Chamber Orchestra, Rudolf Barshai, conductor and viola. Moderato, Canzona: Andante, Rondo: "La Chasse", Allegretto
- J. S. Bach, Partita No. 2 in D minor, BWV 1004, Arranged for viola by Rudolf Barshai. Played on Stradivarius viola, recorded in 1960
- J. S. Bach, Brandenburg Concerto No. 6 for 2 violas. Moscow Chamber Orchestra, live concert recording at the Moscow Conservatory. Rudolf Barshai, conductor and viola
- Robert Schuman, Märchenbilder for viola and piano, Op. 113. Rudolf Barshai, solo viola, accompanied on piano by Vladimir Shreibman
- Sergey Prokofiev, Five pieces from Romeo and Juliet, arranged for viola and piano by R. Barshai
- Handel/Casadesus, viola concerto in B minor (arr. Barshai). Moscow Chamber Orchestra, R. Barshai, viola and conductor
- Glinka, Mikhail Ivanovich, Sonata for Viola and Piano in D minor. Rudolf Barshai, viola, Tatiana Nikolayeva, piano

=== Ensembles ===
- Beethoven – String Trios, Op. 9, No. 1 in G and No. 3 in C minor, with Leonid Kogan, M. Rostropovich. 1958/1958 Melodiya SUCD 10-00552
- Glinka – Sonata for Viola and Piano in D minor, with Tatyana Nikolayeva. Multisonic 310236
- Fauré – Piano Quartet No. 1 in C, Op. 15, with Emil Gilels, L. Kogan, M. Rostropovich. 1958/1958
- Shostakovich – String Quartet No. 3 in F, Op. 73. 1954/1955 Russian Revelation RV10016
  - P. Tchaikovsky – String Sextet in D minor. Multisonic 310182

=== Conducting ===
- Albinoni – Concerto for Oboe, Strings and Harpsichord in B-flat, Op. 7, No. 3. Russian Disc RD CD 10 062
- J. Baur – Symphony Metamorphose, Cologne Radio Symphony Orchestra. 1994 THROFON CTH2270
- Beethoven – Symphonies Nos. 1–8, Orchestra based on MCO. 1969–1975/1970–1976
- Berg – Chamber Concert, O. Kagan, S. Richter, All-Union Radio and TV Large Symphony Orchestra. 1972/UR
- J. S. Bach – Brandenburg Concertos 1, 2, 3 (Rostropovich, cello, 1958), 4 (D. Oistrakh, violin, 1957), 5, 6. 1973/76
  - Wer sich selbst erhöhet, Cantata BWV 47, Pisarenko, Vedernikov, Yurlov Choir. 1965/1966
  - "Gott soll allein mein Herze haben", aria from cantata BWV 68, "Murre nicht, lieber Christ", aria from cantata BWV 144, "Erbarme dich", aria from St Matthew Passion, BWV 244, Dolukhanova. 1958
- Revol Bunin – Symphony No. 5, Op. 45, MPO. 1968/1970
- Biber – Sonata a 6 vocal in B-flat, T. Dokshitser, trumpet, MCO. 1968/1970
- Boccherini – Symphony in E-flat, MCO. 1960/1960
- Brahms – Symphonies Nos. 2 & 4, Cologne Radio Sym. Orchestra, 1999. Laurel Record LR-903
- Britten – Simple Symphony, Op. 4, MCO. 1962/1963
- Bellini – Oboe Concerto in E-flat, E. Nepal, MCO. 1968/1970 Russian Disc RD CD 10 062
- Debussy – Two Dances for Harp and Strings, O. Nardelli. 1965/1965
- Hindemith – Ein Jäger aus Kurpfalz, Op. 45, No. 3, MCO. 1964/1965
- Hummel – Trumpet Concerto in E-flat, T. Dokshitser, MCO. 1968/1970 BMG/RCA Victor #32045
- J. Haydn – Symphonies. Nos. 45 "Farewell", 94 "Surprise", 95, 100 "Military", 101 "Clock", 102, 104 "London", MCO. 1965-1973/1965-1991 Melodiya SUCD 10-00224
- M. Haydn – Symphony in G, MCO. 1976/1991
- Handel – Concerto Grosso Op. 3, Nos. 4a & 5, and Op. 6, Nos. 10 & 12. 1959–1976/1959–1991
- K. Karaev – Symphony No. 3, MCO. 1966/1966
- Yu. Levitin – Oboe Concerto in E minor, Op. 50, Nepalo, MCO. 1967/1969
- A. Lokshin – Symphonies Nos. 5, 7, 10, Songs of Margaret, MCO. 1971–1976/1971 UR Laurel Record LR-901
- Mahler – Symphony No. 5, Junge Deutsche Philharmonie. 1999 Brilliant Classics
  - Symphony No. 6 in A minor, Yomiuri Nippon Symphony Orchestra. 1989 TOBU.
  - Symphony No. 9 in D, Moscow Radio Symphony Orchestra. 1993 BIS – BIS-CD-632
  - Symphony No. 10 (performing version by R. Barshai), Junge Deutsche Philharmonie. 2003 Brilliant Classics – 94040
- Mozart – Symphonies Nos. 1, 10, 18, 20, 22, 24, 25, 28–41, in D, in B-flat, in G, MCO. 1961–1973/1961–1974
- Mussorgsky – Night On Bald Mountain, Vancouver Symphony Orchestra. 1989 CBC 2-5083
- Pergolesi – Stabat Mater, Pisarenko, Arkhipova, Yurlov Choir, MCO. 1966/1966
- Prokofiev – Visions Fugitives, Op. 22, Nos. 1–15, arr. Barshai, MCO. 1962/1963
  - Piano Concerto No. 3 in C major, Op. 26, Mark Zeltser (piano), Cologne R.S. Orch. Laurel Record LR-904
- J. Rääts – Concerto for Strings, Op. 16, MCO. 1963/1963
- Rachmaninoff – Rhapsody on a Theme by Paganini, Op. 43, Mark Zeltser (piano), Cologne Radio Symphony Orchestra, Laurel Record LR-904
- Schubert – Symphony No. 5 in B-flat, D485, MCO. 1964/1964
- Shostakovich – Symphony No. 14, Op. 136, Miroshnikova, Vladimirov. MCO 1970/1970
- Boris Tchaikovsky – Chamber Symphony in G-E, MCO. 1968/1969
- P.Tchaikovsky – Symphony No. 6, Vancouver Symphony Orchestra. 1989 CBC 2-5083
  - Piano Concertos Nos. 2 & 3, Peter Donohoe (piano), Nigel Kennedy (violin), Steven Isserelis (cello), Bournemouth Symphony Orchestra. 1986,1987,1989 EMI CDC 7499392
- Telemann – Concerto for 3 Oboes, 3 Violins and Strings in B-flat. 1965/1967 EMI 724356534025
- Torelli – Violin Concerto in A minor, Op. 8, No. 9, Spivakov, solo, MCO. 1972/1973
- M. Vainberg – Symphony No. 7, Op. 81, MCO. 1967/1969 OLYMPIA OCD 472
- Vivaldi – Concerto in G minor RV577, MCO. 1971/1971
- Verdi – Requiem, live in Waldbühne, Berlin, World Symphony Orchestra, Maryland Chorus, Shinyu-Kai Choir, Sveshnikov Choir. June 11, 1994; IPPNW-Concerts 2-CD

Preceded by Luciano Berio	Artistic Director, Israel Chamber Orchestra; 1976–1981	Succeeded by Uri Segal
Preceded by Uri Segal	Principal Conductor, Bournemouth Symphony Orchestra; 1982–1988	Succeeded by Andrew Litton
