= Rossen Milanov =

Bulgarian conductor

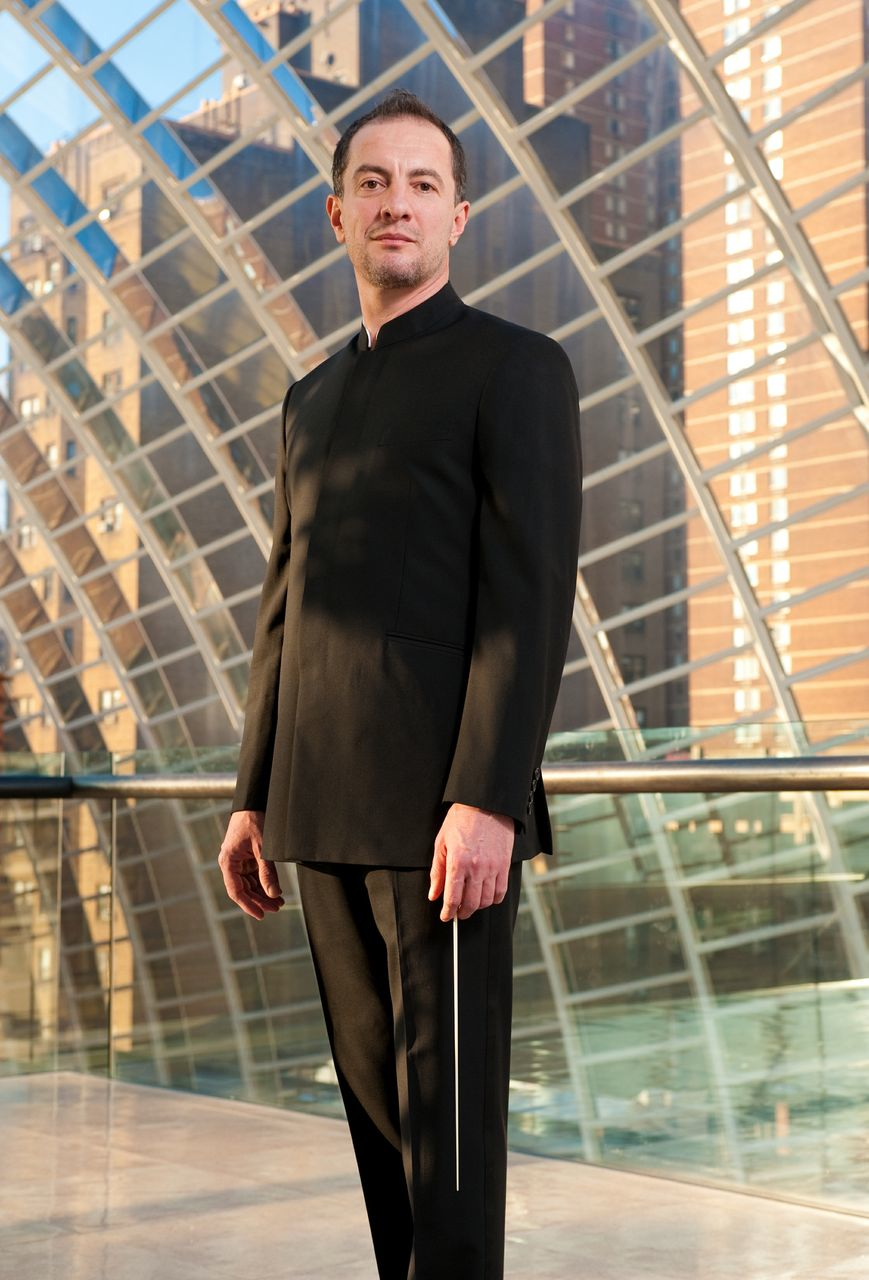

Background information
- Born: Rossen Milanov; Sofia, Bulgaria
- Genre: Classical
- Occupation: Conductor
- Instrument: Oboe
- Years active: 1994–present
- Website: www.rossenmilanov.com

Rossen Milanov (Bulgarian: Росен Миланов) is a Bulgarian conductor. He is music director of the Princeton Symphony Orchestra & New Jersey's Symphony in C. He is also principal conductor of Orquesta Sinfonica del Principado de Asturias, in Spain and the former music director of Bulgaria's New Symphony Orchestra. He is the music director of the Columbus Symphony Orchestra, and the Chautauqua Symphony Orchestra.

== Life and career ==
=== Early life ===
Milanov was born in Sofia, Bulgaria. He studied oboe and orchestral conducting at the Bulgarian National Academy of Music, and he earned his master's degree in oboe performance at Duquesne University. He studied conducting at The Curtis Institute of Music and The Juilliard School, where he received the Bruno Walter Memorial Scholarship.

=== Conducting career ===
From 1994 to 1999, Milanov was conductor of The Juilliard School's Pre-College Orchestra. He acted as music director of the Chicago Youth Symphony Orchestra from 1997 to 2001. He spent over 11 years with The Philadelphia Orchestra, first as assistant conductor from 2000 to 2003, then as associate conductor from 2003 to 2011, and finally as artistic director of the ensemble's summer home at the Mann Center for the Performing Arts from 2006 to 2010. Milanov was chief conductor of the Symphony Orchestra of the Bulgarian National Radio Symphony Orchestra from 2003 to 2008.

In September 2014, Rossen Milanov was named the next music director of the Columbus Symphony Orchestra, effective in the 2015-16 season and with a four-year contract. The following month, the Chautauqua Institution's Chautauqua Symphony Orchestra named Milanov its music director starting in the summer of 2015. From 2018, he is chief-conductor of RTV Slovenia Symphony Orchestra.

=== Awards ===
In 2005, Milanov was named Bulgaria's Musician of the Year. He has received the Bulgarian Ministry's Award for Extraordinary Contribution to Bulgarian Culture and the 2011 ASCAP award for his programming with the Princeton Symphony Orchestra.

=== Collaborators and appearances ===
Milanov has collaborated with Yo-Yo Ma, Itzhak Perlman, Joshua Bell, Midori, and Christian Tetzlaff. He has conducted premieres by Richard Danielpour, Gabriel Prokofiev, and Nicholas Maw, as well as emerging composers through Symphony in C's annual Young Composer's Competition.

He has appeared with such ensembles as the Milwaukee Symphony Orchestra, Grant Park Music Festival, Saint Paul Chamber Orchestra, Baltimore Symphony Orchestra, Orchestra of St. Luke's, BBC Symphony Orchestra, Royal Scottish National Orchestra, Scottish Chamber Orchestra, Orchestre de la Suisse Romande, Rotterdam Philharmonic Orchestra, Residentie Orkest, Sofia Philharmonic Orchestra, Orquesta Nacional de México, NHK Symphony Orchestra, Seoul Philharmonic Orchestra, Hong Kong Philharmonic Orchestra, Orquesta Sinfónica Nacional de Colombia and New Zealand Symphony Orchestra.

Milanov also works as a ballet conductor and has collaborated with choreographers Mats Ek at Zurich Opera and Stockholm's Royal Ballet, Sabrina Matthews and Nils Christe at Stockholm's Royal Ballet, Benjamin Millepied and Andonis Foniadakis at the Geneva Opera, and Jorma Elo in Philadelphia.

=== Opera and vocal experience ===
Milanov has worked with opera companies including Komische Oper Berlin (in Shostakovich's Lady Macbeth of Mtsensk), The Philadelphia Orchestra (in Puccini's La bohème), and The Curtis Opera Theatre (in a recording of Dominick Argento's Postcard from Morocco for Albany Records) and Opera Columbus with Rigoletto.

=== Music education ===
Milanov is music director of the training orchestra Symphony in C and the New Symphony Orchestra in his home city of Sofia, Bulgaria. He appears regularly at Carnegie Hall for Link Up, a program by The Weill Music Institute.

=== Recordings ===
Milanov has recorded Shostakovich's Symphony No. 15, Brahms's Symphony No. 1, and Joseph Jongen's Sinfonia Concertante with The Philadelphia Orchestra – released as A Grand Celebration on the Gothic label in 2008. His work with Russian composer Alla Pavlova with the Moscow Philharmonic Orchestra was released on Naxos Records in 2006. He recently released a recording of Stravinsky's Petrushka and Manuel de Falla's El sombrero de tres picos with Orquesta Sinfonica del Principado de Asturias on Classic Concert Records.
