= Louis de Geer konsert & kongress =

Concert hall and convection centre in Norrköping, Sweden

Coordinates: 58°35′17″N 16°11′4″E

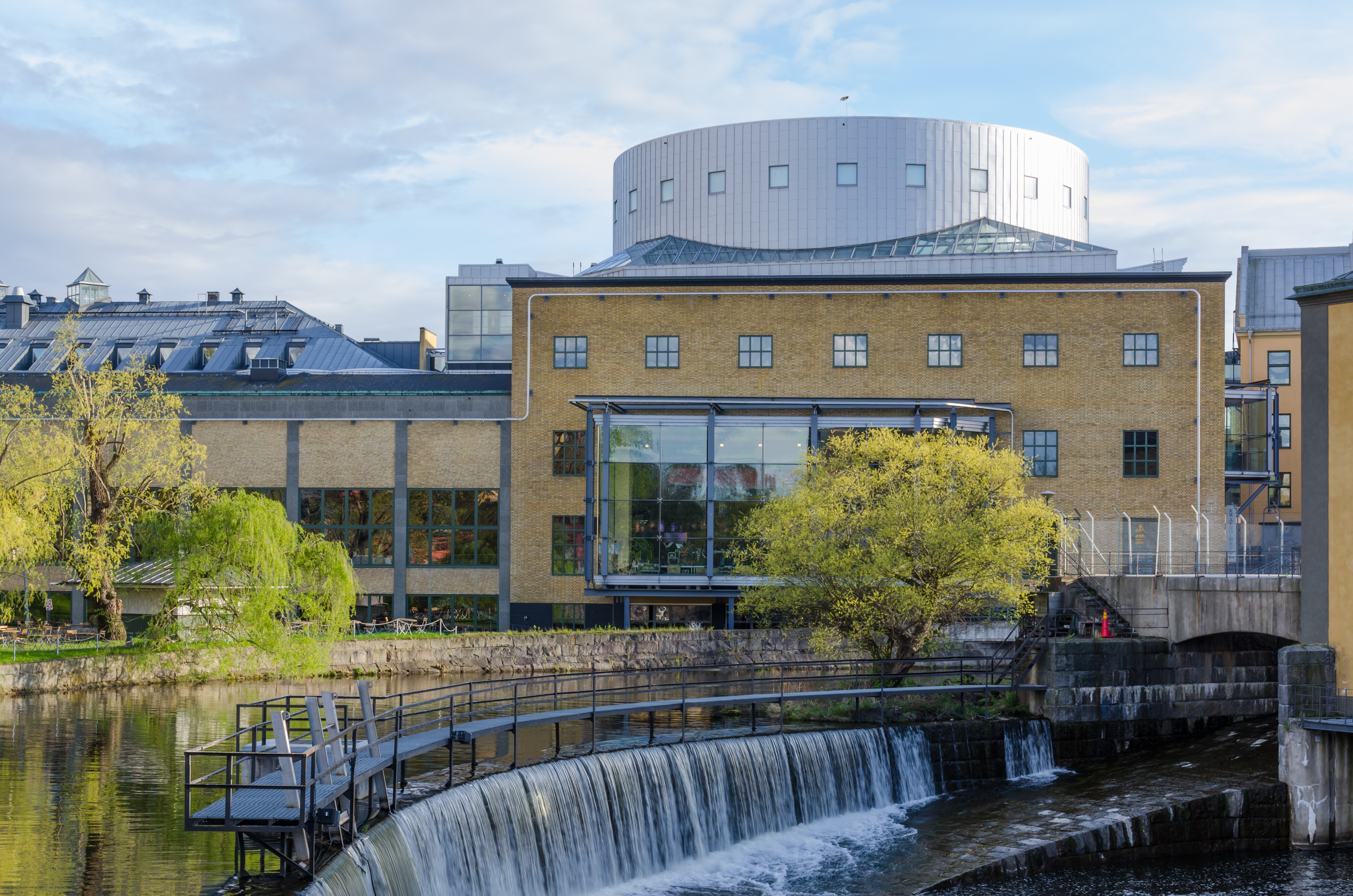
Louis de Geer Concert Hall 2012.

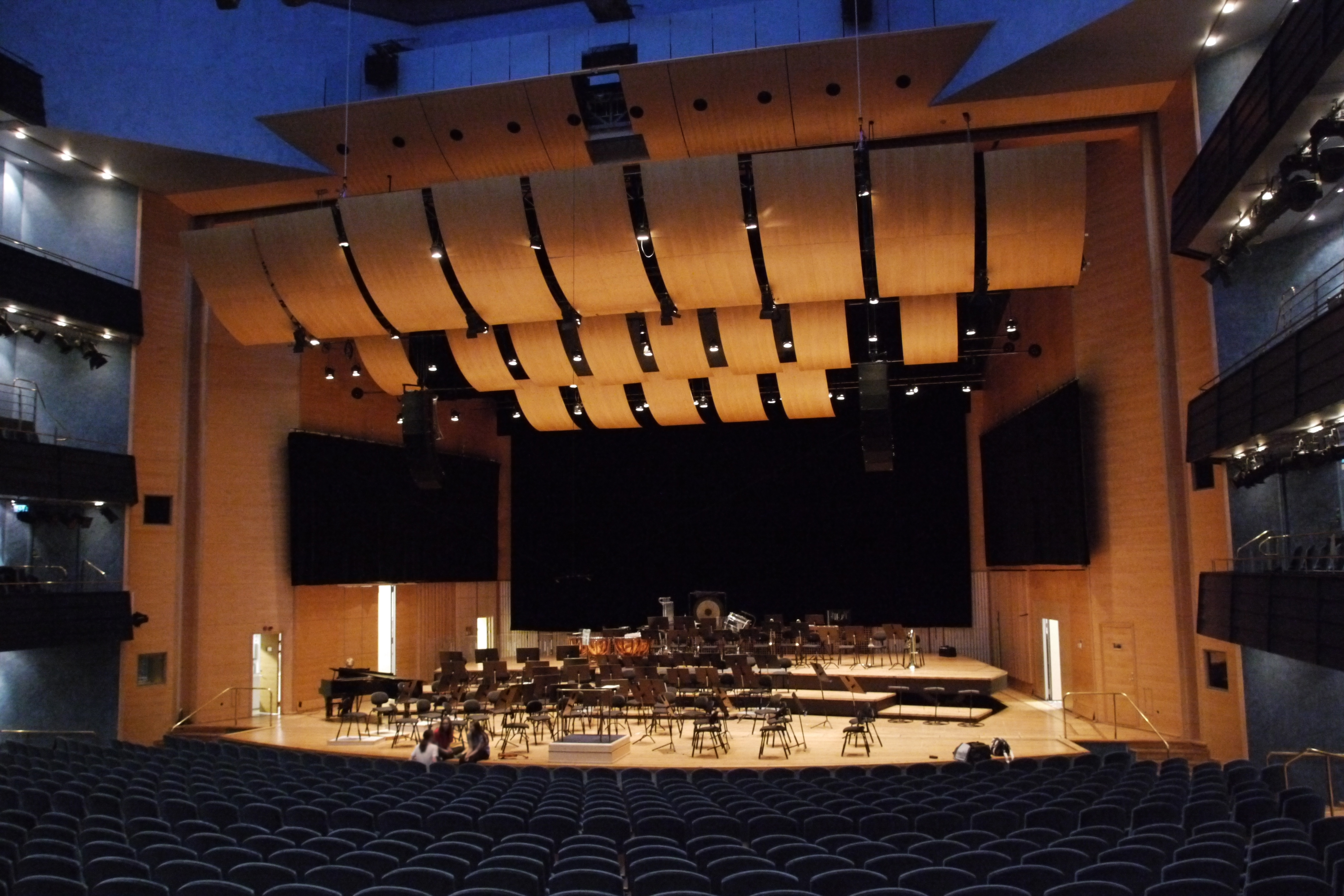
Louis de Geer Concert Hall

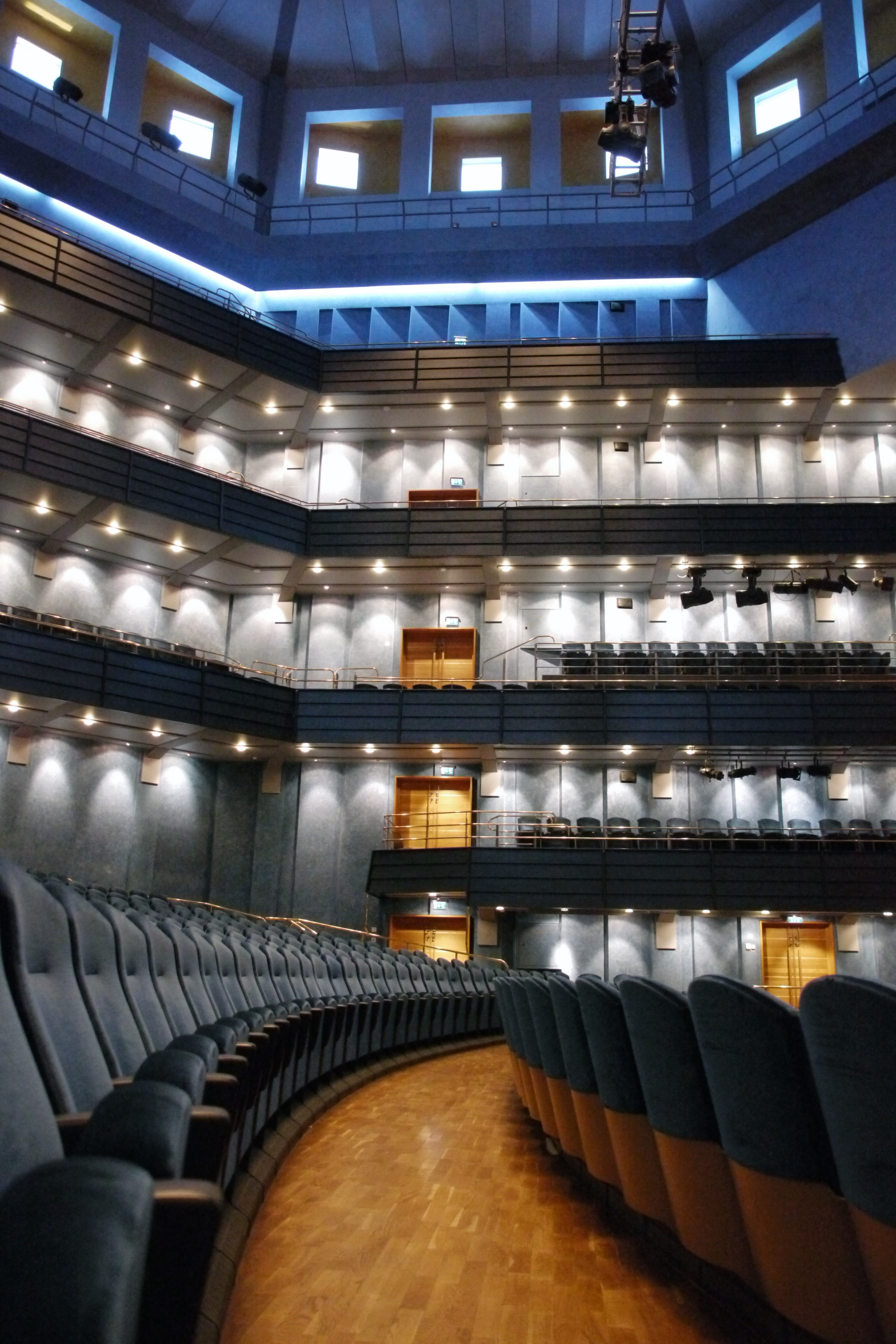
Louis de Geer Concert Hall

Louis De Geer Concert & Congress (Swedish: Louis de Geer konsert & kongress) is a concert hall and convention center located in Norrköping, Sweden. Aside from being the home of the Norrköping Symphony Orchestra, the facilities regularly house various conventions.

It was named after Walloon-Dutch industrialist Louis De Geer (1587–1652). Louis De Geer came to Sweden in 1627 and settled in Norrköping. De Geer established a formidable workshop industry and received a monopoly on the copper and iron trade.

The building that is now Louis De Geer Concert & Congress was first erected in 1954 as a paper mill. It was originally designed by architect Ivar Tengbom (1878–1968). Paper production ceased in 1986. The architects of the concert hall made a point of preserving the industrial character.

== Related reading ==
- Nováky, György (2003) Louis De Geer och hans värld (Uppsala: Leufsta vänner) ISBN 91-631-3938-3
- Bergström, Anders (2001) Arkitekten Ivar Tengbom: byggnadskonst på klassisk grund (Stockholm: Byggförl) ISBN 91-7988-205-6
