= 2020 Summer Olympics closing ceremony =

- Part of 2020 Summer Olympics
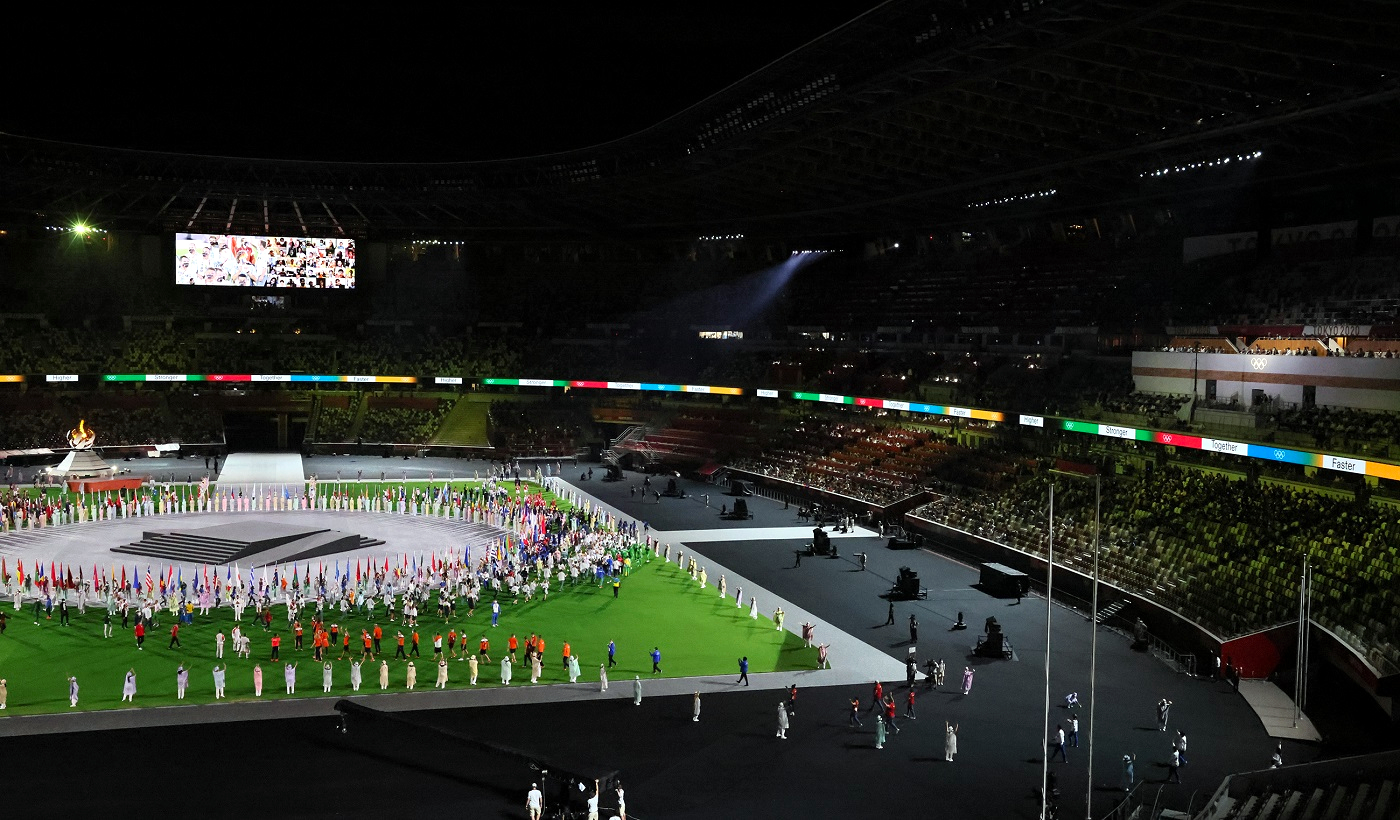
- The Parade of Athletes during the Closing Ceremony. On the stadium's side screens, the Olympic motto, "Faster, Higher, Stronger – Together" is displayed.
- Date: 8 August 2021; 5 years ago
- Time: 20:00 – 22:19 JST (UTC+9)
- Venue: Olympic Stadium
- Location: Tokyo, Japan; 35°40′N 139°49′E
- Theme: "Moving Forward: Worlds we share"
- Filmed by: Olympic Broadcasting Services (OBS)
- Footage: 2020 Summer Olympics Closing Ceremony in Olympic Channel on YouTube

The closing ceremony of the 2020 Summer Olympics took place in the Olympic Stadium in Tokyo for about two and a half hours from 20:00 (JST) on 8 August 2021. The closing ceremony of the Olympic Games, which was postponed for one year due to the effects of the COVID-19 pandemic, was held without spectators. The scale was also reduced compared to past ceremonies as athletes were required to leave the Olympic Village 48 hours after their competitions finished.

The proceedings combined the formal ceremonial closing of this international sporting event (including closing speeches, the parade of athletes and the handover of the Olympic flag) with an artistic spectacle to showcase the culture and history of the current and next host nation (France) for the 2024 Summer Olympics in Paris. The theme of the Olympic Ceremonies was Moving Forward, referencing the COVID-19 pandemic, with the closing ceremony theme being Worlds we share.

The closing ceremony was largely pre-recorded with some live segments. Performers adhered to social distancing measures during the live portions. The ceremony gave a chance for athletes to experience a day in a Tokyo park, included a "moment of remembrance", featuring cultural dances and folk songs from the three national ethnic groups of Japan, and had references to the 1964 Summer Olympics.

The announcers at all ceremonies were Georges Veyssière (French), Mai Shoji (English) and Hiroyuki Sekino (Japanese).

== Preparations ==
The Tokyo Organising Committee of the Olympic and Paralympic Games (TOCOG) gave the first report of preparations in December 2017, with the release of the "Basic Policy" document for the Olympic and Paralympic ceremonies. The document was based upon feedback from experts and opinions of the Japanese public and includes the foundational elements for the positioning and overall concept of the four ceremonies. The Olympic opening ceremony introduced the themes and concepts of the 4 ceremonies, including peace, coexistence, reconstruction, the future, Japan and Tokyo, the athletes and involvement.

The opening and closing ceremonies has had three different directors as its Chief Creative Director. Between July 2018 and December 2020, Mansai Nomura, an actor in traditional Japanese theater, was the Chief Creative Director. Normura stepped down from the role and becoming an advisor. Between December 2020 and March 2021, Hiroshi Sasaki was Chief Creative Director, until Sasaki resigned after making a derogatory comment about Japanese comedian and fashion icon Naomi Watanabe. The reports came a month after Yoshirō Mori, president of the Tokyo 2020 Organising Committee, resigned over derogatory comments made about female members of the committee. Since March 2021, Takayuki Hioki, managing director of Sports Branding Japan, has been the Deputy Chief Ceremonies Officer and Executive Producer.

Italian Marco Balich, head of Balich Worldwide Shows, was the Senior Adviser to the Executive Producer. Balich performed these functions also during the production of the ceremonies on 2006 Winter Olympics, 2014 Winter Olympics and the 2016 Summer Olympics, among another events as 2019 Pan American Games and 2019 Summer Universiade. In an interview, in July 2019, he mentioned that his involvement would be in partnership with the Japanese advertising company Dentsu. Dentsu's creative director for these ceremonies, Kaoru Sugano, resigned in January 2020 over harassment claims.

=== COVID-19 impact ===
In a preview press release, "Moving Forward" would be consistent theme for both 2020 opening and closing ceremonies. The ceremonies would be linked by the concept of "Moving Forward", a reference to recovering from the COVID-19 pandemic and the 2011 Tōhoku earthquake and tsunami. "We have designed the ceremonies around the concept that the Games can bring fresh hope and encouragement to people around the world through the active appearance of athletes at the Tokyo 2020 Games and via the power of sport", organisers declared. This was expected, as just after the postponement, Balich went on record that the crisis would be mentioned at some point during the ceremony due to its significance at the games.

The closing ceremony theme was "Worlds we share" which is expected to cover themes of diversity & inclusion and a brighter and better future. Many sequences of the ceremony were pre-recorded, due to COVID restrictions including traditional Ainu dancers from Hokkaido.

Much of the artistic and cultural sections of the ceremony adhered to social distancing guidelines and the majority of segments were pre-recorded. Before the announcement of barring spectators were made, ticket prices for the closing ceremony were expected to range between ¥12,000 and ¥300,000.

== Venue ==
The Japan National Stadium served as the main stadium for the closing ceremony. Demolition of the old National Stadium was completed in May 2015, followed by the construction of the new stadium which began at the same site on 11 December 2016. The stadium was handed over to the IOC on 30 November 2019 for necessary games and ceremony preparations. Capacity during the Olympic Games was 60,102 taking into account press and executive seating areas.

== Weather conditions ==
- 20:00 temperature 26.3 °C (79.3 °F) humidity 94%
- 22:00 temperature 25.6 °C (78.1 °F) humidity 97%
- No precipitation

== Proceedings ==
=== Program ===
	Title	Procedure (JST : UTC+9)
1	A World of Applause	Video showing highlights (20:00), Fireworks over Stadium (20:01)
2	Ready to Welcome	Crown Prince Fumihito enters with IOC President, National Anthem of Japan performed by choir while raising the Japanese flag (20:02-20:08).
3	After the Games	Parade of flag bearers (20:09-), BGM: Olympic March (Composer, Yuji Koseki), Highlights video of the sports competitions (20:18-20:20), Welcoming the Olympic athletes (20:21-20:42)
4	All Tokyoites	Particles of light soar and form Olympic symbols (20:43-20:45), Music and performance to show the social life of Tokyo & entertain the athletes (20:45-20:58)
5	Our Gratitude	A performance of the National Anthem of Greece (20:59-21:00), Medal Ceremony for Marathon Winners (Women 21:01-21:07, Men 21:08-21:17), Introducing new IOC Athletes commission members, video of volunteers followed by token of thanks from all the athletes for the volunteers (8 representatives on stage) (21:17-21:20)
6	We Remember	Wadaiko performances and Japanese folk songs (21:20-21:34)
7	Prologue: To Paris 2024	The Antwerp Ceremony: started with the Olympic Anthem to lower the Olympic flag (21:35-21:39), Handover of the Antwerp flag from the governor of Tokyo (Yuriko Koike) to the mayor of the next host city, Paris (Anne Hidalgo), via the IOC President. Paris 2024 presentation video played (Performance video of the National Anthem of France by the Orchestre National de France 21:41-21:46, Signature of "Paris 2024" by Tony Estanguet 21:47-21:52).
8	Passing the Baton	Speech by TOCOG President Seiko Hashimoto (21:54-), then IOC President Thomas Bach (Declare the closing of Olympic Games, 22:07)
9	On to the Next Chapter	Figures of actress Shinobu Otake and children singing "A Stroll Among the Stars" (22:08-), Extinguishing the torch (22:15) with "Moonlight" of Debussy (arrangement by Isao Tomita), Video of the Paralympic Games (22:15-22:16), After loud fireworks, the 7 characters of "ARIGATO" projected on the large full high-definition video device (22:17)

=== A World of Applause ===
A fireworks show began the ceremonies, while a highlights video played.

=== Ready to Welcome ===
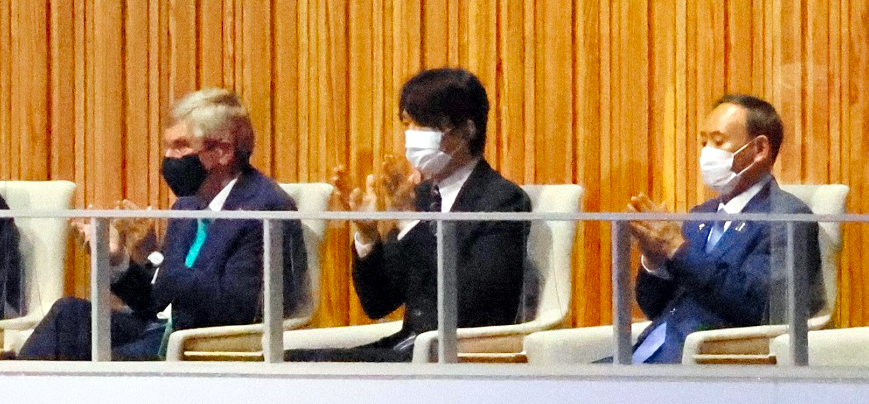
Thomas Bach, Crown Prince Fumihito and Yoshihide Suga (at Japan National Stadium on 8 August 2021)

International Olympic Committee President Thomas Bach and Crown Prince Fumihito entered the stadium while a theme from the film Tokyo Story played. (JST 20:01)

The Japanese flag entered into the stadium carried by six people to the music of "Tokyo Story" by Takashi Yoshima: among these were 4 Olympic champions, the winner of the 60 kg event in judo, Naohisa Takato, the first Youth Olympic champion in breaking, Ramu Kawai, the swimmer Yui Ohashi, who won two gold medals on this Games: the first in women's 400 metres individual medley and another on the 200 metre medley and the artistic gymnast Takeru Kitazono winner of five gold medals on the 2018 Youth Olympic Games and a silver medal on team event on this senior games. The two non-athletes were the doctor Hiroyuki Yokota who worked as medical during the games and the fashion model Yano Amane who uses a leg prosthetic. Amane will who also be present on the opening ceremonies of the Tokyo 2020 Paralympic Games. while the stadium ground was framed like the Yoyogi park with grass all around. The flag was handed to members of the Japanese defence forces, who were present in all the awards ceremonies of the Games. The National Anthem of Japan was performed by the performance group Takarazuka Revue in women's hakama style.

=== After the Games (Parade of Athletes) ===
The flag bearers then arrived in a two by two configuration, until they reach the middle of the stadium. They then surround the middle circle of the stadium floor. After the flags arrived at the stadium a highlights video of the events from all sports was shown.

The entrance of the flags featured the original 1964 Olympic Parade of Athletes music entitled "Olympic March", followed by a more modern-day remix by Fantastic Plastic Machine, KEIZOmachine!, Takeshi Nakatsuka and REMO-CON that played during the athletes' entrance, which combined modern day dance music with the original 1964 Olympic March, and it also featured elements of traditional music from around the world.

Once the athletes all arrived, the lights went out and the athletes were asked to turn on a light (such as a light on their smartphone) where then, an augmented reality (or taped) segment played to show the athletes were united under the Olympic rings.

=== All Tokyoites ===
This segment was to show a day at the park in Tokyo while also showcasing Japanese popular music. The organisers also stated the segment was for the athletes: "Despite having come to Tokyo, the athletes have not had the opportunity to see or experience Tokyo for themselves." The musical portion featured performances by Tokyo Ska Paradise Orchestra, milet, DJ Matsunaga, and the Tokyo Katakura High School Senior Brass Band (the latter performed remotely via pre-recorded material) performing a medley featuring LiSA's Gurenge, Kyu Sakamoto's Sukiyaki, Ludwig van Beethoven's Ode to Joy from Symphony No. 9 and Édith Piaf's Hymne à l'amour as the first reference to Paris, as the host city of the next Games in 2024. This also was the first appearance of Ode to Joy at an Olympic Ceremony since the Sydney 2000 opening ceremony.

=== Our Gratitude ===
==== Marathon victory ceremonies ====
The Greek national anthem, Hymn to Liberty, was played before the marathon victory ceremonies to link the Ancient Olympics to the Modern Olympics. President of the IOC Thomas Bach (for Women's marathon), Vice-President of the IOC Anita DeFrantz (for Men's marathon) and World Athletics President Lord Sebastian Coe presented the medals to:

Women's marathon medalists

- Peres Jepchirchir (KEN)
- Brigid Kosgei (KEN)
- Molly Seidel (USA)

Men's marathon medalists

- Eliud Kipchoge (KEN)
- Abdi Nageeye (NED)
- Bashir Abdi (BEL)

==== IOC Athletes Commission ====
The new members of the IOC Athletes Commission were introduced and presented bouquets to Tokyo 2020 volunteers. A segment dedicated to volunteers was shown before the new members were introduced which featured the volunteers working on enhanced cleaning measures, social distancing and other safety guidelines due to the current COVID-19 pandemic safety measures.

=== We Remember ===
A lone dancer (Aoi Yamada) performed butoh as performers circled around the stage carrying lanterns. Various funeral and mourning rituals performed across Japan were presented at this ceremony in memory of those who died in this exceptionally extended five-year Olympic cycle and also in honor of all those passed around the world during the COVID-19 pandemic. The 3 national ethnic groups of Japanese population were featured: the Ainu from Hokkaido, Eisa performed by Okinawans, and a Nishinomai Bon Odori dance from Akita, to represent the Japanese proper. As the life goes on, the traditional Gujō Odori from Gifu was performed on a party at the Yoyogi Park simulation while performers in yukata kimono performed the traditional Tokyo Ondō around the stage backed by a drummer (Kensaku Sato) and two singers (Takayuki Matsuda and his daughter, Ryu Matsuda), as the tradition determines the volunteers, the performers and the athletes are invited to join in.

=== Prologue: To Paris 2024 ===
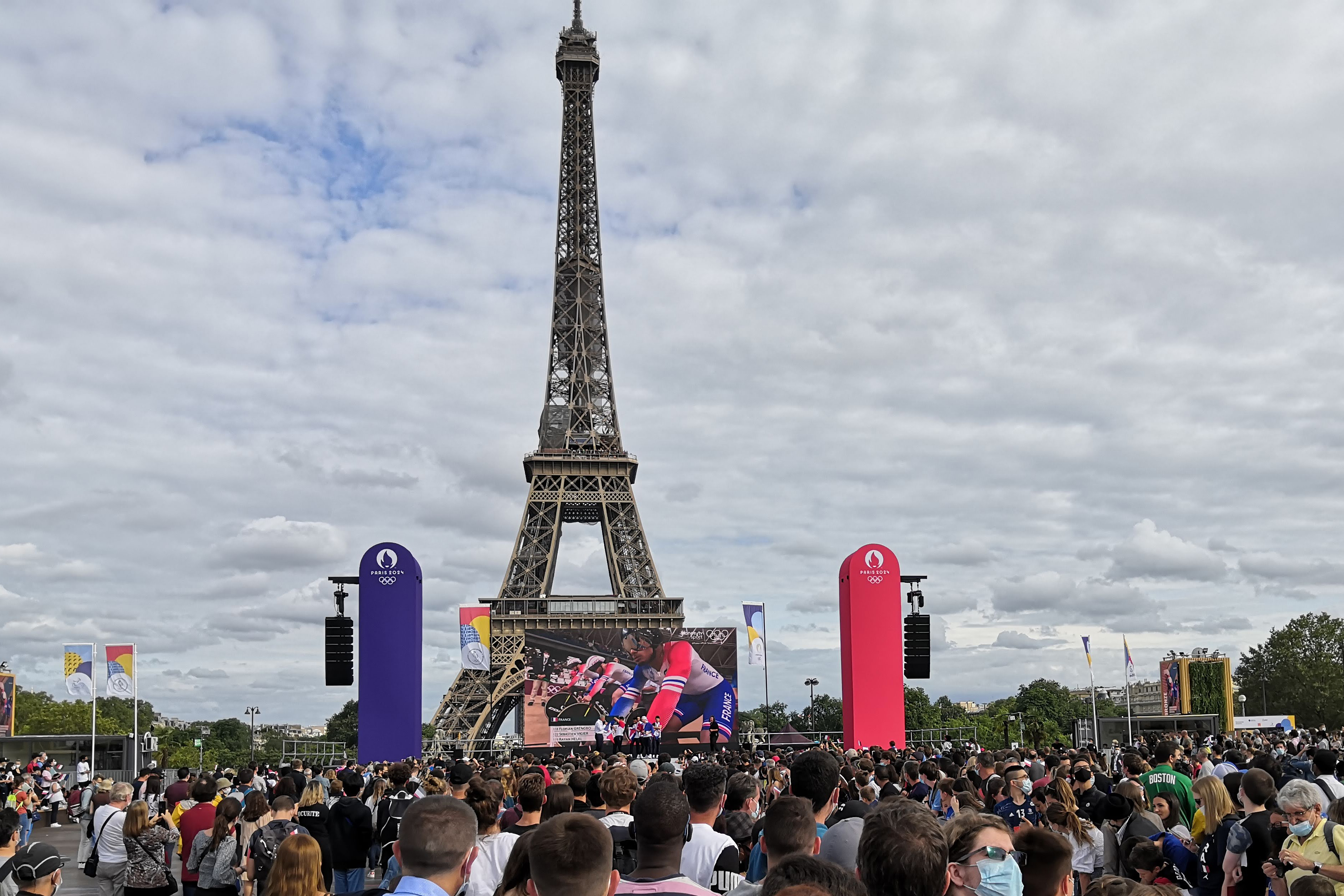
The Trocadéro set up as the Paris 2024 fan area, during the Tokyo 2020 games. This was the location at the end of this segment and where the opening ceremony would be held.

The Antwerp Ceremony is a tradition that has been held at every closing ceremony since 1920. Before the Antwerp Ceremony, the Olympic Anthem was performed by Tomotaka Okamoto as the Olympic flag was lowered. The flag was raised again in Beijing, China for the 2022 Winter Olympics around 180 days later, on 4 February 2022 at the opening ceremony. After the Olympic Anthem was played, Yuriko Koike in a special kimono designed for the ceremony, the Governor of Tokyo, passed the flag to IOC President Thomas Bach, who handed the Olympic flag over to Anne Hidalgo, the Mayor of Paris. This was the first time in Olympic history the flag was passed from between two female mayors.

The Paris 2024 presentation was two pre-recorded films, ended with around 2 minutes of live footage of a special celebration at the Trocadéro, welcoming the comeback of the Modern Olympics to the birthplace of Pierre de Coubertin, founder of the Olympic Movement, in front of the iconic Eiffel Tower at the Trocadéro, Paris (which will serve as the opening ceremonies main venue). This is the first time that an Antwerp Ceremony was presented following the new rules stipulated at Agenda 2020 plan implemented by the IOC in 2014.

The first film presented a contemporary arrangement by Victor le Masne of the National Anthem of France performed by the Orchestre National de France, led by the conductor Chloé Dufresne. The anthem was also performed by musicians simulating a typical day in Paris and place in many known places across the city, as the choices made to represent all the values of the French Republics and specific points of the Paris 2024 Summer Olympic Games, such as the roof of Stade de France (which will host athletics, football, rugby 7's and the closing ceremonies) as the main venue of the Games, the Escalier Daru at the Louvre museum main entrance, where musicians played xilophones ahead of the giant sculpture of the Winged Victory of Samothrace is placed, referring to the return of the Olympic Games of the Modern Era to the city where the modern Olympics ideals were born making a link with the ancient Greece and the fact that the goddess Niké appears on the side of the crown of all Summer Olympic medals, the Place du Vert-Galant symbolizing that these games will be green and respect the environment, Pont Neuf (as the oldest standing structure at the city, as a signal that traditional and modern values can walk together), La REcyclerie (symbolizing innovation, renewal and the vision of the future for the Games and that this specific edition will be more sustainable, innovative and cleaner than ever as far as possible) and the last place was the Skatepark, Diderot at the Seine-Saint-Denis comune (this place symbolizes the concept of world reunion, youth as skateboarding is the youngest sport in the Games's program and that they will be the first, after the COVID-19 pandemic and that the city of Paris and France are always reinventing themselves with youthness, and always accompanies the modernity tendencies with a space of innovation and the fact that these will be 100% urban and sustainable games, hosted within the present urban space and that area will be the main hotspot of the Games.). This chosen places presented all the concepts used at the planning of this edition of the Summer Olympic Games. The Paris 2024 Summer Games will be totally urban, innovative and creative, with the sporting events held mostly within the urban circle and the main sights will be involved and will turn into provisory competition venues and also the three verb tenses of Latin languages: past, present and future. The performance of the Marseillaise finished when the French European Space Agency astronaut Thomas Pesquet played the last few notes of the anthem on his saxophone from the International Space Station, just as it was flying over Tokyo and Japan and the sunlight was already positioning itself to reach France.

Immediately, the second short film Ride, directed by Valentin Petit, started and featured music by Woodkid, starting when sunlight started to shine in France and the footage of the city of Paris seen from space and the Roofs of City concept, as all the film was filmed by drones. This act features young BMX star Estelle Majal incarnating Marianne (the symbol of the French Republic or one of the three symbols seen on the Paris 2024 emblem logo). She presented the city with the world-renowned ceilings of Paris and rides her bike across the roof from many famous landmarks in Paris such as the Palais-Royal, the Musée d'Orsay, the Palais Garnier and Le Panthéon, before ending with a shot of the Eiffel Tower with the revelation of a gigantic flag flying from the Tower featuring the Paris 2024 logo. The 5.200 m^{2} (The flag was 60 meters wide and 90 meters high) was initially planned to be unfurled at the live site during the presentation, but due to weather conditions the flag cannot be revealed, but was actually tangled up in the structure of the Tower. The world record for the largest flag ever flown would be broken, as the Tower would be turned into the tallest flagpole in the world. But, due to bad weather conditions and the high wind speed in the Trocadèro region this cannot happen (as the tower has several functions as a relay for different communication types at the city and also houses the antennas that are used by the flight controllers of the Airports of the Paris Metropolitan Region and the railway system of the entire country, as the flag may interfere with the signals and their operations, in case it gets stuck in the structure), their unfurl moment cannot happen, as the flag was curled up on Tower structure. So, the Organizing Committee decided to use their Plan B option in which the flag was placed there by a CGI animation process. This part of the presentation was the only one that had been made public during the tests carried out on June 8 of the same year, due to the indiscreet tests carried out. On that day, a smaller prototype of the flag was used. This prototype contained parts of the flag that would be cut and sewn into the bigger flag that would be used on that day.

After the film, French Olympic athletes who returned from Tokyo after their competitions were held in the first week of the Games appeared, such as judokas Clarisse Agbegnenou and Teddy Riner with medals, who had returned from Tokyo were at an open-air party with 6000 people watching the closing ceremony at the Trocadéro in celebrating the handover from Tokyo to Paris and the Olympics' return to Paris as the Patrouille de France flew over the Eiffel Tower, with smoke in the national colours of blue, white and red streaming across the Parisian skies, while young performers take to the stage performing breakdancing, a sport that will debut in the Olympic programme in Paris. Finally, French President Emmanuel Macron appeared live from the top of the Eiffel Tower with some young athletes and invited the world to the Games, declaiming the French version of the new Olympic Motto, "Plus vite, Plus haut, Plus fort – Ensemble" ("Faster, Higher, Stronger – Together") starting the ending of the Paris 2024 segment.

After Macron's appearance, the president of the COJOP, Tony Estanguet (who had also just returned from Tokyo in secret, some hours before) appears on stage and writes "Paris 2024" on a camera lens as the camera moves up to the blue skies of summer in Paris just like what happens in tennis Grand Slams. The image is shown on the stadium screens whilst the Tokyo Skytree is shown in the national colours of France, showing a connection between two iconic symbols of current and future host cities, Tokyo's Skytree and Paris' Eiffel Tower.

Local rights owners for the next Games (Discovery, Inc. under Eurosport and France Télévisions) were mainly involved for the Paris 2024 presentation as they handled most of the filming process for the presentation, and was broadcast by satellite (CEST: UTC+2 14:42-14:53). This was the first time in Olympic history that the handover presentation at the closing ceremony was 100% produced, performed and broadcast from outside the current host city and instead from the next host city.

=== Passing the Baton ===
Seiko Hashimoto, President of the Tokyo Organising Committee of the Olympic and Paralympic Games spoke to the athletes "There are no words to describe what you have achieved." "Tonight the Olympic Flame that has lit up Tokyo will quietly go out. But the hope that has been ignited here will never be extinguished. It will remain alight in the hearts of people all over the world as we continue to hope for peace in the spirit of Ekecheiria, a tradition unbroken from the ancient Olympic Games." She also pointed people to the upcoming 2020 Summer Paralympic Games. Her comments were overshadowed by a moth that landed on the podium.

IOC President Thomas Bach thanked the volunteers for an "unprecedented Olympic Games" and said that Japanese people can be "extremely proud of what you have achieved". In French, he declared the Games closed, calling them "the Games of hope, solidarity, and peace", and "call[ed] upon the youth of the world" to assemble in Paris for the Games of the XXXIII Olympiad in 2024.

=== On to the Next Chapter ===
After the presentation and closing speeches, actress Shinobu Otake (with the Suginami Children's Chorus) appeared, simulating an astronomy class in allusion to sci-fi movies and comics as they sang the iconic and popular song, "A Stroll Among Stars" composed by Kenji Miyazawa. The lyrics highlights the constellations that are seen in the Japanese sky during summer nights. After the song ended, an electronic version of Claude Debussy's Clair de lune performed by Isao Tomita started playing, the cauldron's flame was extinguished through a "telekinesis simulation" (the cauldron was simulated to have been extinguished manually as it was impossible to do so in real life) in which the children and the teacher were making a sign of gratitude, shortly thereafter, the structure in which the fire had been burning for the past 16 days closed and reverted to its original shape. As the protocol demands, the last fireworks display then started.

After the fireworks display a trailer of the then upcoming Tokyo 2020 Paralympic Games was screened. Finally, one of the large screens showed a goodbye message with the word "Arigato" which is shown in the same font as the word "Sayonara" was during the closing ceremony of the Olympic Games Tokyo 1964 using stop-motion toy cubes rather than scoreboard lettering. This was a homage and a gratitude to all the people who were involved in the two times the city hosted the Summer Olympic Games (1964 and 2020).

== Dignitaries in attendance ==
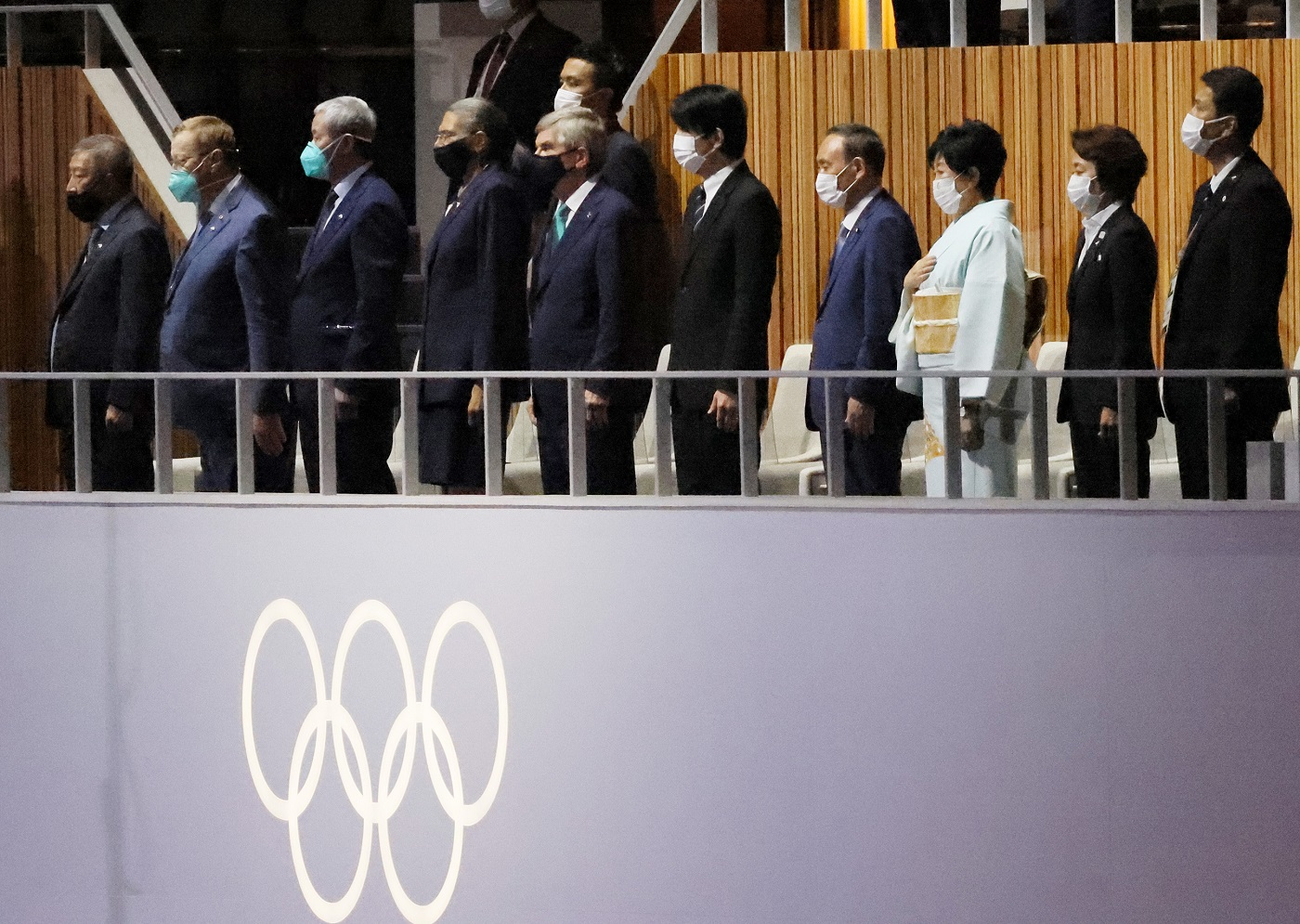
Dignitaries in attendance (at Japan National Stadium on 8 August 2021)

=== Host country dignitaries ===
- Japan
  - Crown Prince Fumihito
  - Prime Minister Yoshihide Suga
  - Governor of Tokyo Yuriko Koike
  - President of TOCOG Seiko Hashimoto

=== Dignitaries from abroad ===
- Estonia – President Kersti Kaljulaid
- France – Mayor of Paris Anne Hidalgo
- United States – United States Ambassador to the United Nations Linda Thomas-Greenfield

=== Dignitaries from International organizations ===
- International Olympic Committee –
  - IOC President Thomas Bach and IOC members
  - IOC Vice-President Anita DeFrantz

== Performers ==
Japanese artists

- Shinobu Otake
- Suginami Children's Chorus
- Tokyo Ska Paradise Orchestra
- milet
- DJ Matsunaga
- Tokyo Katakura High School Senior Brass Band
- Takarazuka Revue

Foreign artists

- (France) Woodkid (live from Paris)

== Anthems ==
- National Anthem of Japan – Takarazuka Revue
- National Anthem of Greece
- (International Olympic Committee) Olympic Anthem – Tomotaka Okamoto
- National Anthem of France – Orchestre National de France, conducted by Chloé Dufresne; featuring Thomas Pesquet (pre-recorded)

=== Victory ceremonies ===
- National Anthem of Kenya (Note: Anthem played twice as part of the Men's and Women's marathon victory ceremonies.)

== Reviews ==
Philip Barker of Inside the Games opined that for many athletes and supporters, the tone of the ceremony was dignified and appropriate. Hashimoto stated in a press interview that the flame would "quietly go out", which he felt that "It was an apt description of a dignified and low key Ceremony which conveyed a sense of gratitude that the Games had been able to take place at all."

Dominic Patten of Deadline Hollywood argued that the ceremony was an "uneven mixtape" of contrasts, comparing the low-key "celebration of the culture of the Asian power and brow moping acknowledgement of the pandemic" to the jubilant Paris segment, as well as cliché-filled speech of Thomas Bach.

Alan Tyres of The Daily Telegraph discussed the IOC updated motto as a sign of things to come. He stated, "The updated Olympic motto of 'faster, higher, stronger – together' fits with how sport is covered and contextualised at this moment in history: inclusion, diversity, justice and a duty of care to the athletes must be taken into consideration as much as performance." He also discussed the strangeness of the ceremony, as it was performed without a stadium audience.

== See also ==
- 2020 Summer Olympics opening ceremony
- 2020 Summer Olympics cauldron
- 2020 Summer Paralympics opening ceremony
- 2020 Summer Paralympics closing ceremony
