= Sergey Chernyshev =

Sergey or Sergei Chernyshev may refer to:

- Sergey Chernyshyov (architect)
- Sergey Chernyshev (footballer)
- Sergei Chernyshev (breakdancer)
- Sergey Chernyshev (rugby union)
- Sergei Chernyshev (academic)
