= Bogotá Philharmonic Orchestra =

Symphony orchestra in Bogotá, Colombia

- Orchestra
- Native name: Orquesta Filarmónica de Bogotá
- Founded: 1967
- Location: Bogotá, Colombia
- Principal conductor: Joachim Gustafsson
- Website: filarmonicabogota.gov.co

The Bogotá Philharmonic Orchestra (Spanish: Orquesta Filarmónica de Bogotá; abbreviated OFB) is a symphony orchestra based in Bogotá, Colombia. Founded in 1967, it is attached to the city administration of Bogotá through the Secretariat of Culture, Recreation and Sport of Bogotá.

The orchestra has performed in major Bogotá venues including the León de Greiff Auditorium, the Teatro Jorge Eliécer Gaitán, the Fabio Lozano Auditorium of the Universidad Jorge Tadeo Lozano, and the Teatro Mayor Julio Mario Santo Domingo. It has also developed activities in conventional and non-conventional spaces throughout the city.

== History ==
The orchestra was created after the activity of the Fundación Filarmónica Colombiana and the work of the Colombian conductor Raúl García. It was formally recognised in Bogotá in 1967 with the aim of democratising musical culture, promoting chamber-music practice, encouraging conducting, and disseminating symphonic music. Its first concert took place in 1967 at the Teatro Colón under the baton of Melvin Strauss.

One year after its foundation, the orchestra was chosen to take part in the musical homage to Pope Paul VI during his visit to Colombia in 1968. The orchestra has also accompanied major public events in Bogotá, including the field masses of Pope Paul VI in 1968 and Pope Francis in 2017.

Over its history, the orchestra has performed large-scale works of the international symphonic repertoire. According to the orchestra, it has performed cycles of composers such as Gustav Mahler, Anton Bruckner and Béla Bartók. It has also given particular attention to Colombian music and to projects intended to widen public access to symphonic music.

== Music directors and conductors ==
The orchestra's music directors and principal conductors have included Jesús Pinzón Urrea, José Buenagu, Dimitar Manolov, Carmen Moral, Francisco Rettig, Irwin Hoffman, Eduardo Diazmuñoz, Lior Shambadal, Enrique Diemecke, Ligia Amadio, Josep Caballé Domenech and Joachim Gustafsson.

In 2021, the Swedish conductor Joachim Gustafsson was appointed principal music director. The appointment followed a process in which the orchestra's musicians voted from a shortlist proposed by the general management after the musicians had submitted a list of candidates for the position. Gustafsson had previously debuted in South America with the Bogotá Philharmonic Orchestra in 2012.

== Repertoire and activities ==
The Bogotá Philharmonic Orchestra performs standard symphonic repertoire, Colombian music, opera, vocal-symphonic works, popular and traditional music, and large-scale civic and cultural projects. In addition to its regular symphonic activity, the institution has taken part in Bogotá's wider cultural ecosystem, including events such as Rock al Parque, Ópera al Parque, Jazz al Parque, Hip Hop al Parque, dance festivals and theatre festivals.

The orchestra has performed across Bogotá's 20 localities and has developed programmes aimed at expanding access to orchestral music. Since 2013, the institution has also been described by the orchestra as developing into a wider "system of orchestras", including youth, children's, chamber and specialised ensembles. These include the Filarmónica Juvenil de Cámara, Filarmónica de Música Colombiana, Banda Filarmónica, Filarmónica de Mujeres, and other ensembles attached to the Bogotá Philharmonic system.

The orchestra's educational work includes a programme for children and young people. The Secretariat of Culture, Recreation and Sport states that the educational project reaches more than 20,000 children and adolescents aged between seven and seventeen, while the orchestra's historical institutional page describes a broader philharmonic system including the main orchestra, youth ensembles, children and young people in the training project, and their teachers.

During the COVID-19 pandemic, the orchestra moved part of its activity into virtual formats while maintaining its educational project. The orchestra also presented large-scale digital productions and collaborations such as Soy Colombiano, Pueblito Viejo, and concerts with Juanes, Cholo Valderrama and Monsieur Periné.

== Collaborations ==
The Bogotá Philharmonic Orchestra has worked with a wide range of conductors, soloists and guest artists. Conductors associated with the orchestra include Jesús Pinzón Urrea, José Buenagu, Jaime León, Dimitar Manolov, Carmen Moral, Francisco Rettig, Irwin Hoffman, Eduardo Diazmuñoz, Lior Shambadal, Enrique Diemecke, Ligia Amadio, Josep Caballé Domenech, Joachim Gustafsson, Kent Nagano, Nayden Todorov, Andrés Orozco-Estrada, and Krzysztof Penderecki.

Guest soloists and artists include Plácido Domingo, Santiago Cañón-Valencia, Philippe Quint, Radek Baborák, Mūza Rubackytė, Juanita Lascarro, Hans Ever Mogollon, Patricio Sabaté, Totó la Momposina, China Moses, Miguel Poveda, Juanes, Aterciopelados, Herencia de Timbiquí, Puerto Candelaria, Manuel Medrano, Petit Fellas, Kraken and Valeriano Lanchas.

== Recordings and awards ==
The Bogotá Philharmonic Orchestra won the Latin Grammy Award for Best Instrumental Album in 2008 for the album 40 años.

In 2018 the album 50 años tocando para ti, recorded by the orchestra and dedicated to Colombian music, won the Latin Grammy Award for Best Engineered Album; the award was presented to sound engineer Rafa Sardina. The album was produced by Colombian producer, pianist and composer Julio Reyes Copello and included ten works connected with Colombian musical traditions such as pasillo, bambuco, aguabajo, joropo, cumbia, porro pelayero, vallenato and fandango.
