= Josep Caballé Domenech =

Spanish conductor (born 1973)

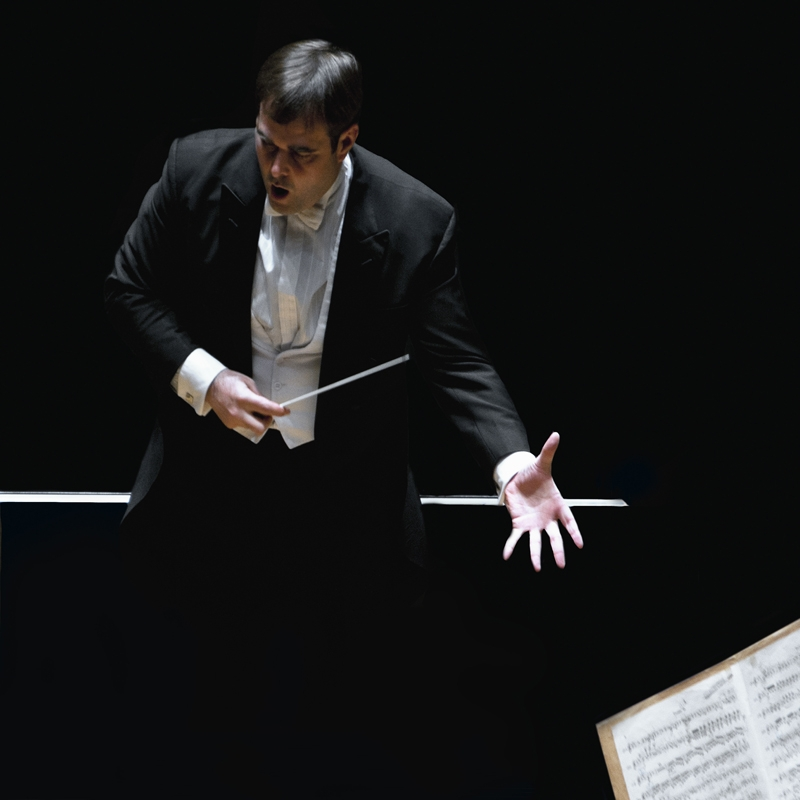
- Born: 1973 (age 52–53); Barcelona, Catalonia, Spain
- Occupation: Conductor
- Website: josepcaballedomenech.com

Josep Caballé Domenech (born 1973) is a Spanish conductor. He is currently chief conductor of the Moritzburg Festival and conductor laureate of the Colorado Springs Philharmonic.

== Biography ==
Josep Caballé-Domenech was born in Barcelona into a family of musicians. He studied piano, percussion, singing and violin and took conducting lessons with David Zinman and Jorma Panula at the Aspen Music Festival, Sergiu Comissiona, and also at Vienna's University of Music and Scenic Arts.

Caballé-Domenech was awarded the Aspen Prize from the American Academy of Conducting at Aspen. He was selected to be 'Sir Colin Davis' Protégé' in the first Rolex Mentor and Protégé Arts Initiative's inaugural cycle (2002–2003). He was the winner of the 1st Concurso Jóvenes Directores de Orquesta Sinfónica del Principado de Asturias (2000) and of the 13th Nicolai Malko International Competition for Young Conductors (2001). Caballé-Domenech was principal guest conductor of the Norrköping Symphony Orchestra from 2005 to 2007.

In February 2011, Caballé-Domenech first guest-conducted the Colorado Springs Philharmonic as an emergency substitute for Lawrence Leighton Smith. In May 2011, the orchestra named Caballé-Domenech as its next music director, and he took the title effective with the 2011–2012 season. In early 2016, the orchestra announced the conversion of Caballé-Domenech's contract as music director into a contract with an indefinite tenure. In January 2022, Caballé-Domenech announced his intention to stand down as the orchestra's music director at the close of the 2022–2023 season, citing in his resignation letter his disagreements with the curtailing of orchestra activities during the COVID-19 pandemic. In May 2023, the Colorado Springs Philharmonic named Caballé-Domenech as its conductor laureate, the first conductor in the orchestra's history to receive that title.

From 2013 to 2018, Caballé-Domenech was chief conductor of the Staatskapelle Halle. In June 2017, the Orquesta Filarmónica de Bogotá announced the appointment of Caballé-Domenech as its next artistic director, effective in 2018. In February 2019, the Moritzburg Festival announced the appointment of Caballé-Domenech as its next chief conductor.

Caballé-Domenech and his wife Monica have two children.

Cultural offices
Preceded by Lawrence Leighton Smith	Music director, Colorado Springs Philharmonic; 2011–2023	Succeeded by Chloé Dufresne
Preceded by Karl-Heinz Steffens	General music director, Staatskapelle Halle; 2013–2018	Succeeded by Ariane Matiakh
Preceded by Enrique Diemecke	Artistic director, Bogotá Philharmonic; 2018–present	Succeeded by incumbent
