= Irwin Hoffman =

American conductor (1924–2018)

Irwin Hoffman (November 26, 1924 – March 19, 2018) was an American conductor active in North America and Latin America.

Hoffman studied at the Juilliard School and was a protégé of Serge Koussevitsky, and he made his conducting debut at the age of seventeen with the Philadelphia Orchestra at Robin Hood Dell (now the Mann Center for the Performing Arts). He was music director of the Vancouver Symphony from 1952 to 1964, and served the Chicago Symphony Orchestra as assistant conductor (1964–65), associate conductor (1965–68), acting music director (1968–69), and conductor (1969–70).

Hoffman became the first music director of the Florida Orchestra (then the Florida Gulf Coast Symphony) in 1968. He was music director of the Bogotá Philharmonic, Colombia for one year, the Chile Symphony Orchestra for three seasons (from 1995 to 1997) and Costa Rica's National Symphony Orchestra from 1987 to 2001, but he also conducted some concerts with the same orchestra in 2016.

Hoffman died in Costa Rica on March 19, 2018, aged 93.

Cultural offices
Preceded by (no predecessor)	Music Director, Florida Orchestra; 1968–1988	Succeeded by Jahja Ling
Preceded by Francisco Rettig	Music Director, Bogotá Philharmonic; 2003–2004	Succeeded by Eduardo Diazmuñoz
