= Colorado Springs Philharmonic =

Orchestra in Colorado Springs, Colorado, U.S.

- Origin: Colorado Springs, Colorado, United States
- Genres: Classical, others
- Years active: 2003–present
- Members: Music Director; Chloé Dufresne; Associate conductor Thomas Wilson; President and CEO; Nathan Newbrough
- Past members: Conductor laureate Josep Caballé Domenech
- Website: csphilharmonic.org

The Colorado Springs Philharmonic is an American orchestra based in Colorado Springs, Colorado, United States. The orchestra gives its concerts principally at the Pikes Peak Center for the Performing Arts, and also performs regularly at the ENT Center for the Arts at the University of Colorado Colorado Springs. The orchestra's current music director is Chloé Dufresne, as of the 2025–2026 season.

== History ==
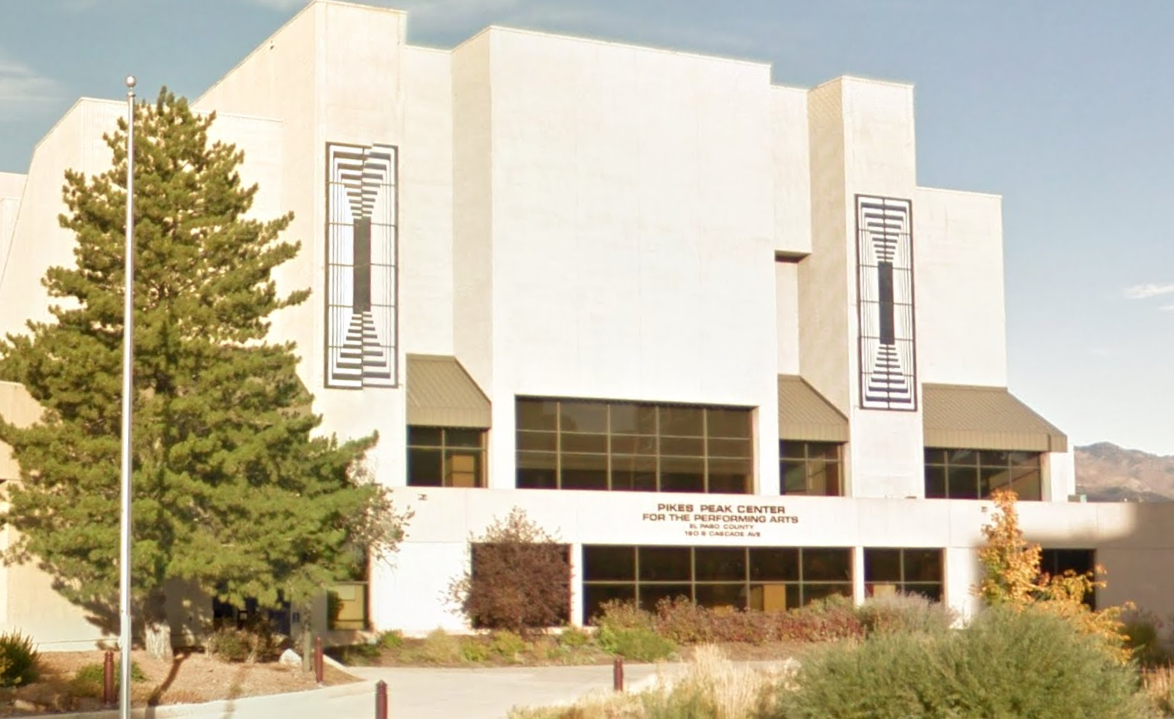
Pikes Peak Center

=== Colorado Springs Symphony ===
The precursor ensemble to the Colorado Springs Philharmonic was the Colorado Springs Symphony, founded in 1927 by Edwin Dietrich as the Colorado Springs Symphony Ensemble. In 1928, Frederick Boothroyd succeeded Dietrich. In 1930, the organisation was incorporated as the Colorado Springs Symphony Orchestra Association. Boothroyd remained as music director of the orchestra until 1954, the longest-serving music director in the orchestra's history. Subsequent music directors of the Colorado Springs Symphony included Charles Ansbacher (1968–1987), Christopher Wilkins (1990–1996), and Yaacov Bergman (1996–1999). Lawrence Leighton Smith became the final music director of the Colorado Springs Symphony in 2000, serving in the post until the dissolution of the orchestra in 2003.

=== Formation and history of the Colorado Springs Philharmonic ===
Following the bankruptcy and dissolution of the Colorado Springs Symphony in March 2003, and the subsequent formation of the Colorado Springs Philharmonic as the successor ensemble to the Colorado Springs Symphony, the new orchestra hired Smith as its first music director. To fund the first season of the Colorado Springs Philharmonic, the new orchestra conducted a fund-raising drive between June and November 2003, raising $834,986 from nearly 2,000 donors. An additional $290,000 consisted of matching funds from the El Pomar Foundation, the Pikes Peak Community Foundation, the Joseph Henry Edmondson Foundation and the Bee Vradenburg Foundation. It maintained the musicians and musical director from the symphony with a "leaner and more innovative" business plan.

In 2008, Nathan Newbrough became executive director of the orchestra. He focused on season ticket sales, types of performances and staffing to grow the philharmonic. By 2011, the orchestra had begun to see improvements in audience size and more performances. Newbrough had increased the staff from 2 to 7 and offered family season tickets at discounted rates to draw in first-time audience members. The philharmonic increased programming to exceed that of similarly sized cities. In addition, according to the League of American Orchestras, the philharmonic had 70% more programming than other orchestras with the same budget. Newbrough credits the success of the organization on its music director, staff, and contributors like the El Pomar Foundation. In 2009, the philharmonic received Enterprise Zone status, which means that federal and state tax credits are given to donations. For instance, a $10,000 donation could be reduced to a net cost of $3,600 due to the tax credits. The credits encourage donations to Colorado nonprofit and business organizations, which help them to build infrastructure, hire and retain employees and make capital improvements.

Smith stepped down as music director in 2011 due to a diagnosis of Binswanger's Disease. He had previously announced in 2009 his intention to step down at the end of the 2010–2011 season.

In February 2011, Josep Caballé-Domenech first guest-conducted the orchestra, as an emergency substitute for Smith. In May 2011, the orchestra named Caballé-Domenech as its next music director, and he took the title effective with the 2011–2012 season. In early 2016, the orchestra announced the conversion of Caballé-Domenech's contract as music director into a contract with an indefinite tenure.

In March 2020, the COVID-19 pandemic caused the orchestra to halt concerts. The orchestra's board of directors subsequently voted to cancel its recently negotiated five-year contract with the musicians' union. An 18-month contract dispute between the orchestra musicians and the board of directors resulted. The new contract negotiations resulted in a three-year agreement that was approved in October 2021.

Concerts by the orchestra resumed in January 2022. That same month, Caballé-Domenech announced his intention to stand down as the orchestra's music director at the close of the 2022–2023 season, citing in his resignation letter his disagreements with the curtailing of orchestra activities during the COVID-19 pandemic. In May 2023, the orchestra named Caballé-Domenech as its conductor laureate, the first conductor in the orchestra's history to receive that title.

In January 2024, Chloé Dufresne first guest-conducted the orchestra. In July 2025, the orchestra announced the appointment of Dufresne as its next music director, effective with the 2025–2026 season, with an initial contract of three seasons. Dufresne is the first female conductor to be named music director of the Colorado Springs Philharmonic. In May 2026, the orchestra announced the appointment of Eunike Tanzil as its first-ever composer-in-residence, effective with the 2026–2027 season.

== Music directors ==
=== Colorado Springs Symphony ===
- Edwin Dietrich (1927–1928)
- Frederick Boothroyd (1928–1954)
- Walter Eisenberg (1954–1965)
- Harold Farberman (1965–1968)
- Charles Ansbacher (1968–1987)
- Christopher Wilkins (1990–1996)
- Yaacov Bergman (1996–1999)
- Lawrence Leighton Smith (2000–2003)

=== Colorado Springs Philharmonic ===
- Lawrence Leighton Smith (2003–2011)
- Josep Caballé Domenech (2011–2023)
- Chloé Dufresne (2025–present)

== See also ==
- Colorado Springs, Colorado#Arts and culture
- List of orchestras in the United States
- Music of Colorado
