= Lê Minh Hiếu =

Vietnamese breakdancer (born 2000)

B4
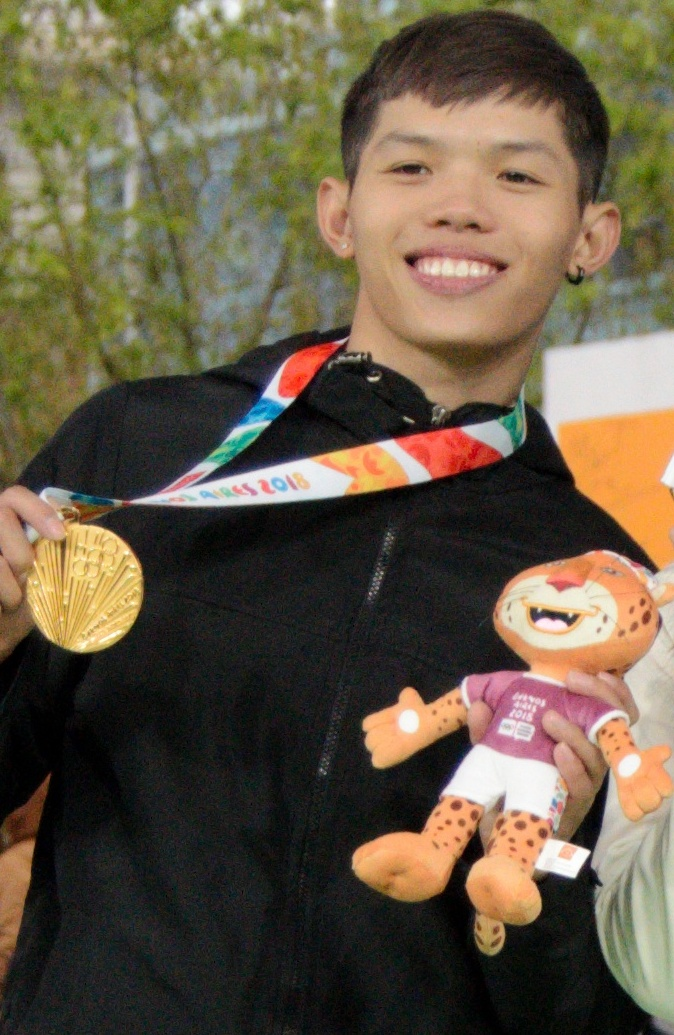
- Lê Minh Hiếu in 2018

Personal information
- National team: Vietnam
- Born: Lê Minh Hiếu; June 30, 2000 (age 26) Biên Hòa, Đồng Nai, Vietnam

Sport
- Country: Vietnam
- Sport: Breaking
Medal record
Breaking
Representing Vietnam
Youth Olympic Games
Gold medal – first place	2018 Argentina	Breaking Mixed Team

Lê Minh Hiếu (born 30 June 2000), also known as B4, is a Vietnamese breakdancer. He is part of the mixed team 2018 Summer Youth Olympics gold medal winner in breakdancing.

== Early life ==
Minh Hiếu was born in Biên Hòa City, Đồng Nai province, Vietnam. In the family, Hiếu is the eldest of three children. When he was young, his father was imprisoned due to gambling, and his mother raised three children alone while suffering from kidney failure. In 2015, after their mother died, Hiếu and his brother were adopted by a breakdancer from Ho Chi Minh City.

== Career ==
Minh Hiếu began breakdancing in 2011 after watching dancers perform on television. In 2016, Hiếu participated in Vietnamese TV show So You Think You Can Dance season 5, advanced to the final round, and finished as the runner-up. In 2017, Hiếu competed in the World Youth Breaking Championship Qualification events held by the World DanceSport Federation (WDSF). He first participated in Taiwan, placed 20th, and then advanced to the next qualification in Kawasaki, Japan. His performance in Japan placed him in 12th position, which secured him a spot at the 2018 Summer Youth Olympics in Buenos Aires, Argentina.

At the Youth Olympics, he placed last in the B-Boy individual category, but went on to win the gold medal in the Breaking Mixed Team event, alongside dancer Ram from Japan. The victory marked Vietnam's first medal in Olympic breaking and the fourth gold medal won by Vietnamese athletes at the 2018 Youth Olympics. After the competition, Hiếu became a teacher at a Vietnamese dance school in Ho Chi Minh City. Hiếu also continued to represent Vietnam in various regional competitions.
