= Daniell Revenaugh =

American pianist and conductor (1934–2021)

Daniell Revenaugh (May 30, 1934 – March 12, 2021) was an American classical pianist and conductor.

== Career ==
Revenaugh was born in Louisville, Kentucky. He made his debut as a pianist at the age of 14 playing Beethoven's First Piano Concerto with the Louisville Orchestra.

He studied with Ferruccio Busoni's pupil Egon Petri from 1951 until Petri's death in 1962. In 1959 he graduated from Florida State University, where he studied with Ernst von Dohnányi and Lewis Pankaskie. He later founded the Busoni Society with Rudolph Ganz and Gunnar Johansen, and has amassed a large and important collection of Busoni and Petri materials.

In 1973 Revenaugh became the first General Director of the Institute For Advanced Music Study in Crans-Montana, Switzerland, a full scholarship international programme with faculty which included Zino Francescatti, Gregor Piatigorsky, Ib Lanzky-Otto and Rudolf Kempe.

Daniell Revenaugh invented and patented a lower lid for the grand piano, which projects the sound more effectively. It has been used in concert by pianists such as Martha Argerich, Peter Serkin, André Watts, Radu Lupu and Alexander Toradze. He also patented a muting device for grand pianos, which protects downstairs neighbors.

Revenaugh created the Electric Symphony Orchestra. In the 1980s he created the Classical Cabaret, which performed solo and chamber works to the accompaniment of jugglers, paddleballs, yo-yos, Indian clubs and fire eaters. He was involved in a project to convert opera composer Carlisle Floyd's former home in Tallahassee, Florida into an artist's residence.

He had four children and three grandchildren and had homes in Berkeley, California; Tallahassee, Florida; and Lausanne, Switzerland. Revenaugh owned many pianos, among which was the 1840 Érard upon which Franz Liszt played the first solo piano recital. The Erard is autographed by Liszt himself. In 2008 Revenaugh made a DVD of Carlisle Floyd's Piano Sonata, which included an hour of coaching by Floyd himself.

== Revenaugh's musical activities in the San Francisco Bay area ==
- Performance of the Dohnányi Piano Concerto No. 2 with George Cleve and the San Jose Symphony in 1977, marking the centenary of Ernst von Dohnányi's birth (27 July 1877).
- Initiated an all Darius Milhaud concert at Mills College in 1992, celebrating Milhaud's centenary (4 September 1892). As a graduate student Revenaugh studied at Mills College with Milhaud.
- A series of the complete Schubert piano sonatas at the Julia Morgan Theater in Berkeley, honoring Schubert's bicentenary (1797). Each of the five concerts contained one early, one late and two middle period sonatas (20 in all).

== Recordings ==
- In 1967 Revenaugh recorded the Busoni Piano Concerto with John Ogdon (piano), the Royal Philharmonic Orchestra and the John Alldis Choir at Abbey Road studios for EMI. This recording won the Deutscher Schallplatten Preis, the Montreux Award, a Grammy nomination and has remained in the EMI catalogue for 51 years. It was coupled with Busoni's Two Studies from his opera Doktor Faust: "Sarabande and Cortege", Op. 51.
- an EMI disc of "Popular Piano Classics", containing popular works by thirteen famous composers.
- the complete music for 2 pianos by Busoni, with Lawrence Leighton Smith (EMI).
- the premiere recording in 2009 of the Piano Sonata of Carlisle Floyd, America's best known opera composer. He composed it in the 1950s for Rudolf Firkušný, who played it at a Carnegie Hall recital. Floyd coached Revenaugh on the Sonata for an hour. Revenaugh then recorded it one take - both of which are captured on a DVD available at Arkiv Musik and CD Baby.
