= Fabrice Bollon =

French conductor

Fabrice Bollon (born Paris, 1965) is a French conductor and composer.

== Biography ==
Bollon studied with Michael Gielen and Nikolaus Harnoncourt in Paris and at the Mozarteum in Salzburg. He subsequently continued his studies with Georges Prêtre and Mauricio Kagel.

In 2008, Bollon was appointed musical director of the Freiburg Opera and the Freiburg Philharmonic Orchestra. Under Bollon, the Freiburg Opera has recorded a series of lesser-known operas for CPO, including Riccardo Zandonai's Francesca da Rimini, Francesco Cilea's L'arlesiana, and Karl Goldmark's Die Königin von Saba. With the Freiburg Philharmonic Orchestra, Bollon has also recorded commercially for Naxos. He concluded his Freiburg tenure in 2021.

In May 2022, the Staatskapelle Halle announced the appointment of Bollon as its next GMD, effective with the 2022-2023 season, with an initial contract of 5 years. In January 2026, the city of Halle announced an extension of Bollon's contract with the Staatskapelle through 31 July 2032. Bollon and the Staatskapelle Halle have recorded commercially for such labels as Naxos.

Cultural offices
Preceded by Patrick Peire and Robert Groslot	Chief Conductor, Symfonieorkest Vlaanderen; 1994-1998	Succeeded by David Angus
Preceded by Patrik Ringborg	Generalmusikdirektor, Theater Freiburg; 2008-2021	Succeeded by André de Ridder
Preceded by Ariane Matiakh	Generalmusikdirektor, Staatskapelle Halle; 2022-present	Succeeded by incumbent
