= Lawrence Leighton Smith =

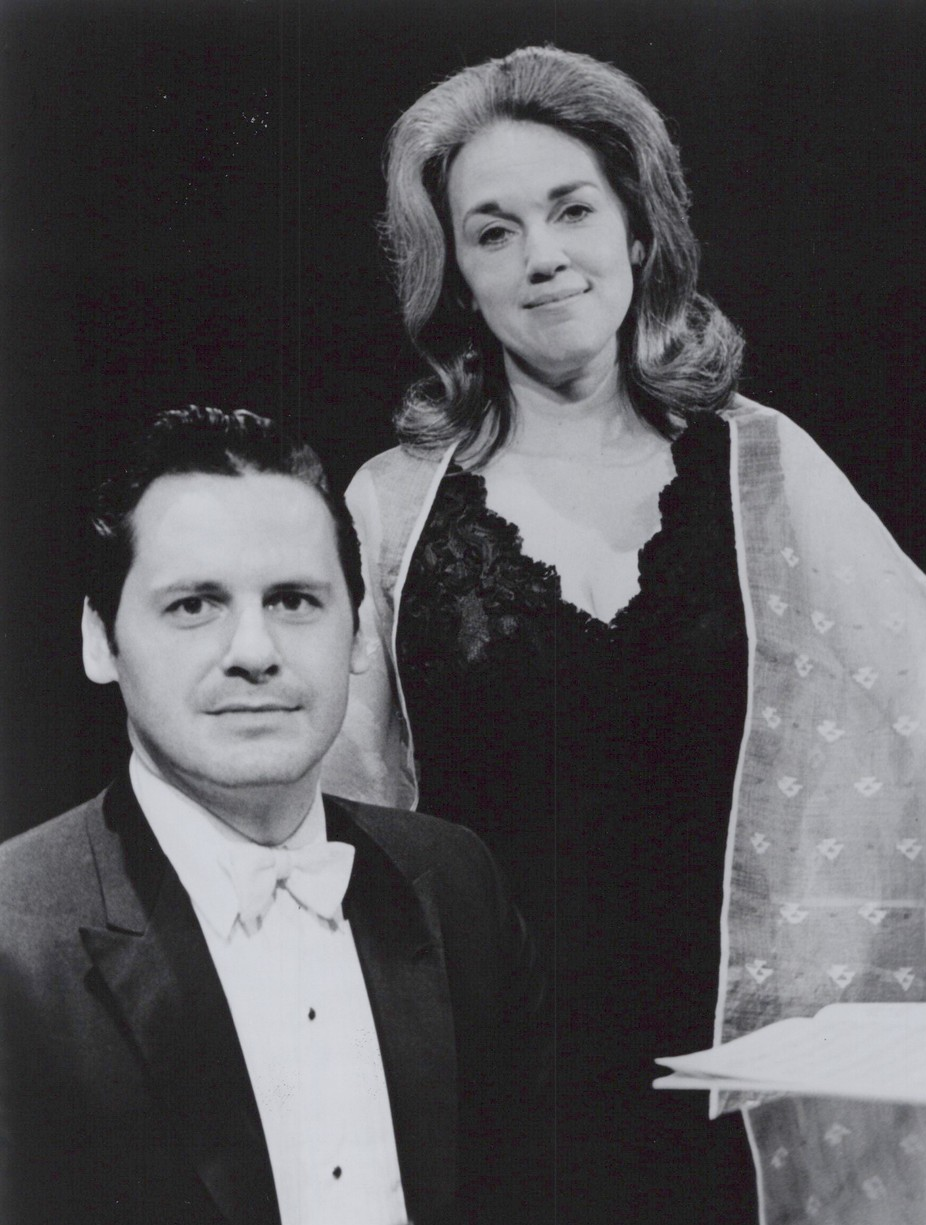
Smith and Jan DeGaetani in 1970

Lawrence Leighton Smith (April 8, 1936 – October 25, 2013), was an American conductor and pianist.

Smith was born in Portland, Oregon. He studied piano with Ariel Rubstein in Portland and Leonard Shure in New York. He earned bachelor's degrees from Portland State University in 1956 and Mannes College of Music in 1959. He also earned a doctorate from the University of Louisville in 1992.

He won first prize in the Mitropoulos International Conducting Competition in 1964. He was assistant conductor at the Metropolitan Opera 1964–1967 and music director of the Westchester Symphony Orchestra 1967–1969. He was principal guest conductor of the Phoenix Symphony 1970–1973 and music director of the Austin Symphony 1972–1973. He served as music director of the Oregon Symphony 1973–1980 and the San Antonio Symphony 1980–1985.

Smith became the artistic advisor and principal guest conductor of the North Carolina Symphony 1980–1981, and music director of the Louisville Orchestra (1983–1994). He was also principal guest conductor of the New Jersey Symphony Orchestra 1997–2000.

He was the music director of the Music Academy of the West in Montecito from 1985 to 1993 and artistic director of the Yale Philharmonia at the Yale School of Music from 1995 to 2004. He became music director of the Colorado Springs Symphony in May 2000, and in 2003 he became the first music director of the new Colorado Springs Philharmonic. He also has served as the music director of the Sunriver Music Festival in Oregon for over 17 seasons.

Smith guest conducted nearly every major orchestra in the United States, including the American Symphony Orchestra, Baltimore Symphony Orchestra, Cincinnati Symphony Orchestra, Dallas Symphony Orchestra, Indianapolis Symphony Orchestra, Minnesota Orchestra, New York Philharmonic, Pittsburgh Symphony Orchestra, Rochester Philharmonic Orchestra and the Saint Louis Symphony Orchestra. He also conducted orchestras in Europe and Asia.

As a pianist, Smith accompanied many famous artists, including Franco Corelli, Sherrill Milnes, Zara Nelsova, Ruggiero Ricci, Richard Stoltzman, Jennie Tourel, Renata Tebaldi, Walter Trampler, and Pinchas Zukerman. He also recorded the complete works for 2 pianos by Ferruccio Busoni, with fellow pianist Daniell Revenaugh.

Recordings include "The Moscow Sessions" for Sheffield Lab (for which he became the first American-born conductor to conduct the Moscow Philharmonic Orchestra in 1986). He also made recordings for RCA Victor Red Seal. With the Louisville Orchestra, he made numerous contributions to its First Edition Recordings series, including works of William Bolcom, Marc-Antonio Consoli, John Corigliano, Brian Fennelly, Sofia Gubaidulina, Karel Husa, Otto Luening, Robert Xavier Rodriguez, Boris Pillin, Gundaris Poné, Gunther Schuller, Stephen Suber, and Joan Tower.

Smith died from complications of Binswanger's Disease, a form of dementia in Colorado Springs, Colorado on October 25, 2013, at the age of 77.

== Awards ==
- Ditson Conductor's Award, Columbia University, 1988

Cultural offices
Preceded by Jacques Singer	Music Director, Oregon Symphony; 1973–1980	Succeeded by James DePreist
Preceded by François Huybrechts	Music Directors, San Antonio Symphony; 1980–1985	Succeeded by Christopher Wilkins
