= Staatskapelle Halle =

German symphony orchestra

The Staatskapelle Halle is a German symphony orchestra based in Halle, Saxony-Anhalt, Germany. Part of the umbrella organisation Theater, Oper und Orchester GmbH Halle, the orchestra performs symphonic concerts, and also serves as the orchestra for the Oper Halle.

== History ==
The historical precursor ensemble was the Hallische Stadtorchester, formed in 1852. Separately, Max Richards founded the Stadttheater-Orchester, and later in 1907, the Hallesche Orchester-Vereinigung. The theatre orchestra evolved into the Handel Festival Orchestra by 1957.

In 1934, Bruno Vandenhoff became the first Generalmusikdirektor (GMD) in Halle. In 1946, Arthur Bohnhardt established the Hallische Volkssinfonieorchester, but left for West Berlin in 1949. This ensemble received the new name Staatliches Sinfonieorchester Halle in 1954.

In 2006, the current Staatskapelle Halle was formed from the merger of the Philharmonischen Staatsorchesters with the Handel Festival Orchestra. Karl-Heinz Steffens was the first Generalmusikdirektor of the orchestra under its present name, from 2008 to 2013. Josep Caballé Domenech was the next chief conductor, from 2013 to 2018.

In September 2018, the orchestra announced the appointment of Ariane Matiakh as the new Generalmusikdirektorin of the Theater, Oper und Orchester GmbH Halle, effective with the 2019-2020 season. Matiakh was the first female conductor ever to be named to the posts. In January 2020, by mutual agreement, Matiakh resigned from the company.

In May 2022, the orchestra announced the appointment of Fabrice Bollon as its next GMD, effective with the 2022-2023 season, with an initial contract of 5 years. In January 2026, the city of Halle announced an extension of Bollon's contract with the orchestra through 31 July 2032. Bollon and the Staatskapelle Halle have recorded commercially for such labels as Naxos.

== General Music Directors ==
- Karl-Heinz Steffens (2008–2013)
- Josep Caballé Domenech (2013–2018)
- Ariane Matiakh (2019–2020)
- Fabrice Bollon (2022–present)
