= E. J. Thomas Hall =

Coordinates: 41.0786°N 81.5151°W

E. J. Thomas Performing Arts Hall
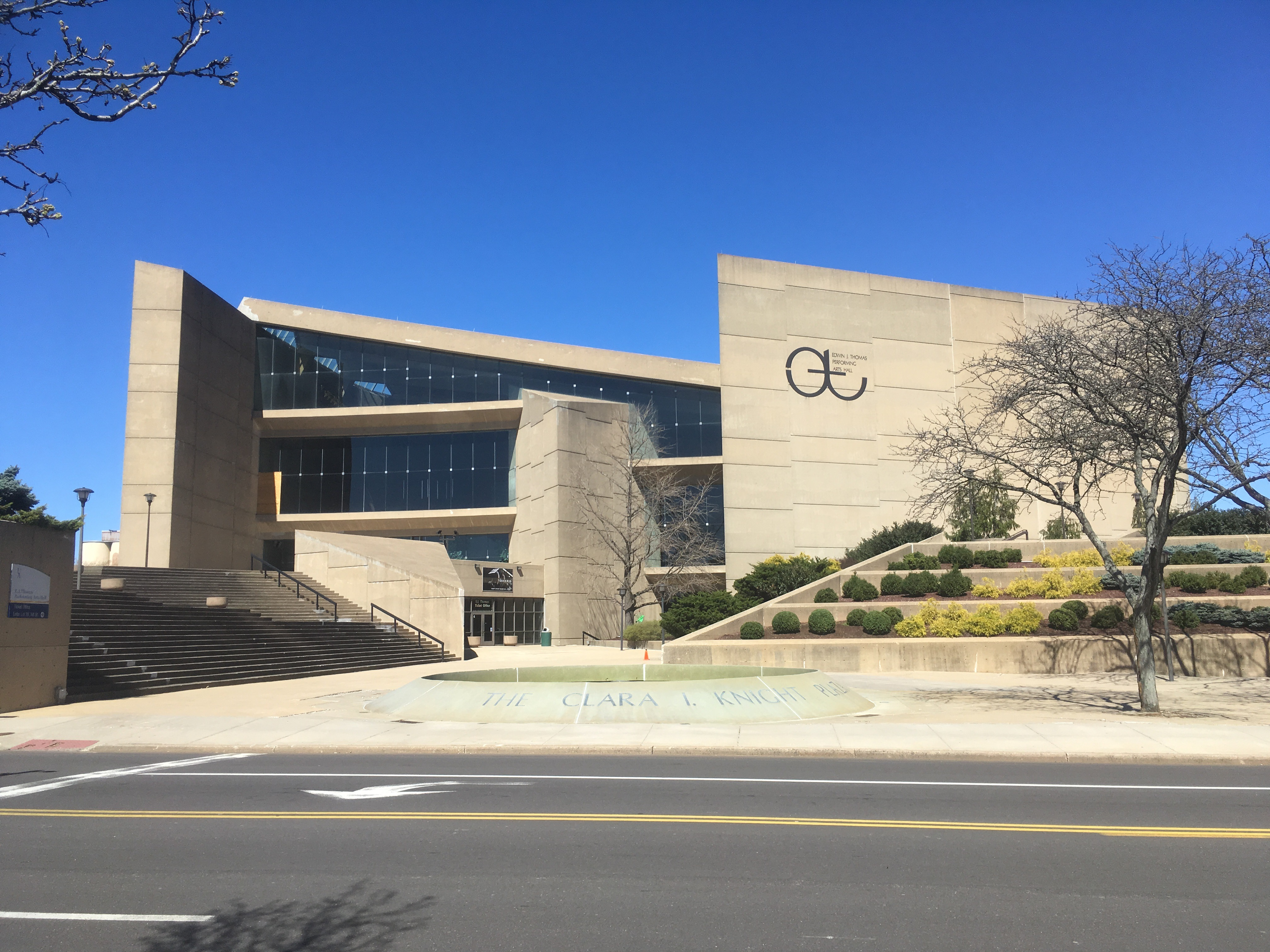
- E. J. Thomas Hall
- Interactive map of E. J. Thomas Performing Arts Hall
- Address: 198 Hill Street; Akron; United States
- Owner: University of Akron
- Capacity: 2,955
- Type: Concert hall

Construction
- Opened: 1973

E. J. Thomas Performing Arts Hall, more commonly known as E. J. Thomas Hall, is a performing arts hall located in downtown Akron, Ohio on the University of Akron campus.

== History ==
Opened in 1973, The University of Akron's E. J. Thomas Performing Arts Hall is a 125,000-square-foot (11,600 m^{2}) hall, that can seat up to 2,955 people, depending on the arrangement of the facility. It seats 2,955 with the ceiling at full height, 2,343 with it at the front edge of the flying balcony, and 743 when the grand tier is entirely closed off.

On October 9, 1973, the hall opened "with a world premiere by Mexican composer Carlos Chavez," performed by the Akron Symphony Orchestra.

The first director of The University of Akron's E. J. Thomas Hall was Clint Norton, followed by Robert D'Angelo, co-producer of Mummenschanz on Broadway in 1979 and Dan Dahl in 1991.

The University of Akron named the facility in honor of Edwin Joel Thomas, the former chairman and CEO of The Goodyear Tire & Rubber Co., who later served on the university's board of trustees.
