= Ariane Matiakh =

French conductor

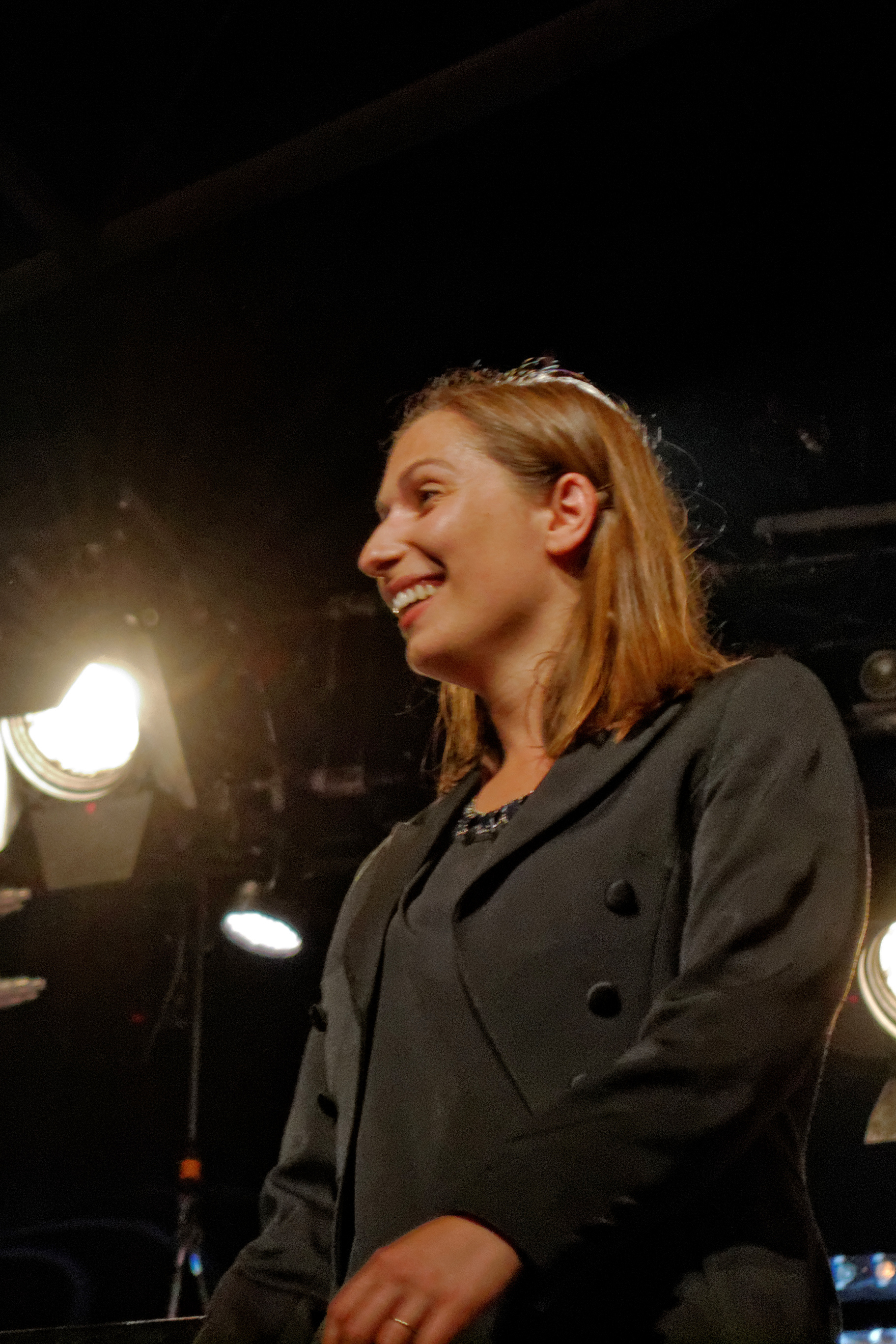
Matiakh conducting the Orchestre symphonique de Bretagne in July 2014

Ariane Matiakh (born 1980) is a French conductor.

== Biography ==
The daughter of two opera singers, Matiakh obtained prizes in piano, chamber music, conducting at the Conservatoire à rayonnement régional de Reims and piano accompaniment at the Conservatoire à rayonnement régional de Rueil-Malmaison. At the same time, she began her musical career as a pianist and vocal conductor in various French institutions. She sang in the Arnold Schoenberg Choir, under the direction of Nikolaus Harnoncourt and Ádám Fischer. From 2002 to 2005, she studied conducting at the Musik Hochschule in Vienna in the class of Leopold Hager and Yuji Yuasa and followed the advice of Seiji Ozawa in masterclasses.

In 2005, Matiakh was appointed assistant conductor of the Opéra national de Montpellier. Her replacement at short notice for James Conlon in May 2006 in Shostakovich's Symphony No. 7 was highly noted and marked the beginning of her international career.

In September 2018, the Staatskapelle Halle announced the appointment of Matiakh as its new Generalmusikdirektorin (General Music Director), the first female conductor ever named to the post, effective with the 2019–2020 season. This appointment marked the first music directorship for Matiakh. She has recorded commercially with the Staatskapelle Halle for Berlin Classics. In January 2020, by mutual agreement, Matiakh resigned from her Staatskapelle Halle post, effective 31 January 2020.

In contemporary music, Matiakh has conducted works by Richard Dubugnon, Bechara El-Khoury and Éric Tanguy. In November 2021 she conducted the premiere of Philippe Hersant's opera Les Éclairs at the Opera-Comique in Paris. Matiakh first guest-conducted at the BBC Proms in July 2022.

== Honours and awards ==
- Winner of the first edition of the "Talents conductors Adami" in 2008.
- Was named "Revelation Conductor" at the Victoires de la musique classique in 2009 and conducted the Orchestre national de Lorraine live on France 3 during the awards ceremony.
- Chevalier of the Ordre des Arts et des Lettres, appointed by the French minister of culture Aurélie Filippetti in January 2014.
- Officier of the Ordre des Arts et des Lettres, appointed by the French minister of culture Rima Abdul Malak in October 2022.

== Selected discography ==
- Zara Levina: Piano Concertos (Maria Lettberg, Berlin Radio Symphony Orchestra), Capriccio C5269
- Francis Poulenc, Jean Françaix: Concertos (Mona Bard and Rica Bard, Deutsche Staatsphilharmonie Rheinland-Pfalz), Capriccio C5237
- Johanna Doderer: Symphony No. 2 / Violin Concerto No. 2 (Anne Schwanewilms, Yury Revich, Deutsche Staatsphilharmonie Rheinland-Pfalz), Capriccio C5245
- Ernst von Dohnányi: Piano Concertos Nos. 1 and 2 (Sofja Gulbadamova, Deutsche Staatsphilharmonie Rheinland-Pfalz), Capriccio C5387
- Ernst von Dohnányi: The Veil of Pierrette (Vienna Radio Symphony Orchestra), Capriccio C5388
- Clara Schumann and Ludwig van Beethoven: Piano Concertos (Ragna Schirmer, Staatskapelle Halle), Berlin Classics
- Charles Koechlin: The Seven Stars Symphony; Vers la Voûte Etoilée (Sinfonieorchester Basel), Capriccio C5449

Cultural offices
Preceded by Josep Caballé Domenech	General Music Director, Staatskapelle Halle; 2019–2020	Succeeded by Fabrice Bollon
