= Akron Symphony Orchestra =

Symphony orchestra in Akron, Ohio

The Akron Symphony Orchestra is a professional orchestra based in Akron, Ohio. The ASO was founded in 1949. In 2006, the ASO appointed Christopher Wilkins music director. Wilkins has agreed to serve as director through 2021.

The Akron Symphony Orchestra is operated by the Greater Akron Musical Association (GAMA).

== History ==
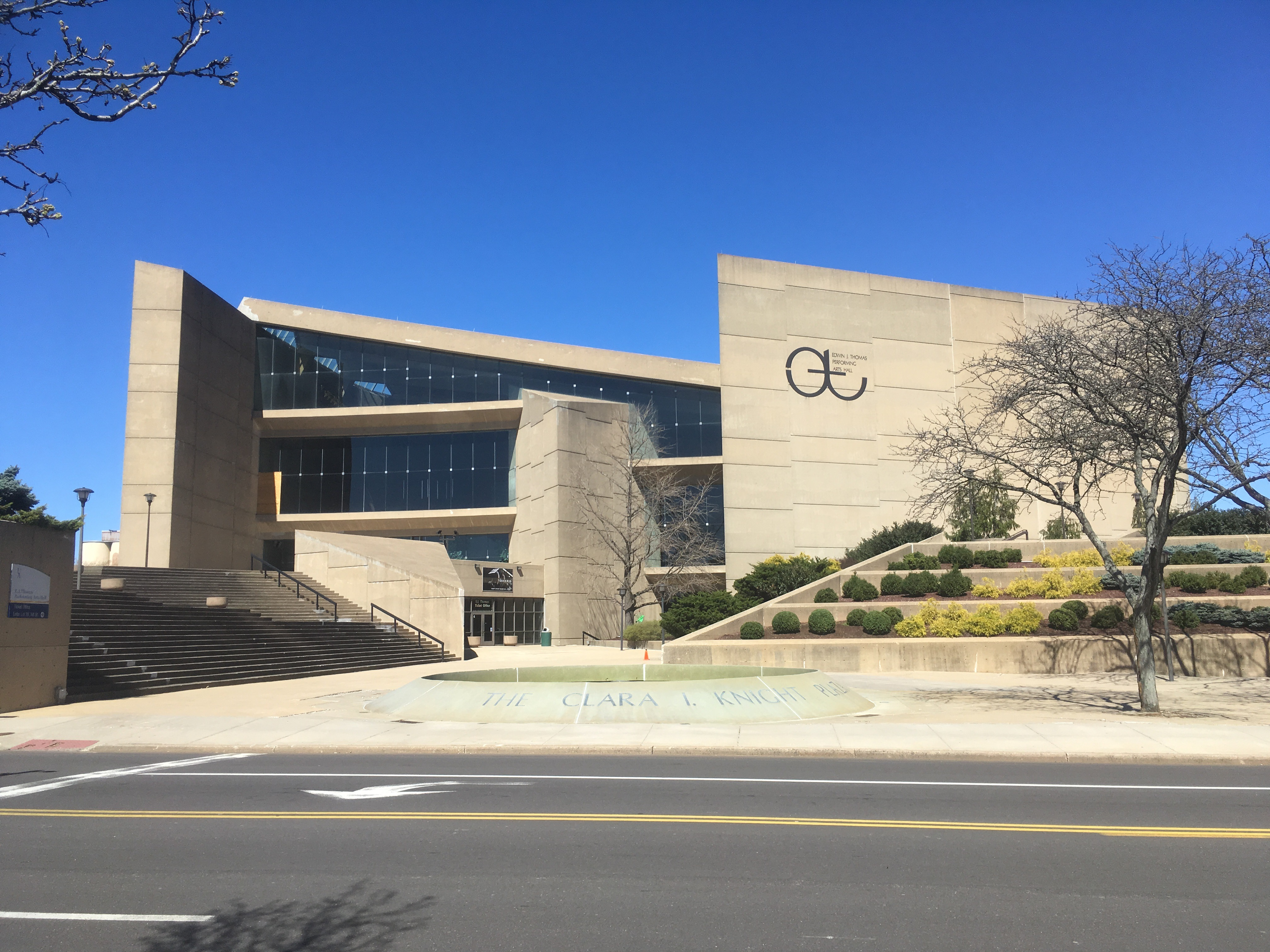
E. J. Thomas Hall, the main performance location for the Akron Symphony Orchestra.

The founding of the orchestra dates to 1949, when John Barry, "business manager of the Akron Beacon Journal, present[ed] Mabel Graham with $500 to start a symphony orchestra."

The first performance of the Akron Symphony Orchestra was on February 24, 1953, in a concert "led by John Francis Farinacci, a high school teacher and band director," at Central-Hower High School.

On October 9, 1973, "E.J. Thomas Performing Arts Hall opened with a world premiere by Mexican composer Carlos Chavez" and performed by the Akron Symphony.

=== Conductors ===
Past conductors have included Laszlo Krausz (starting in 1954), Louis Lane (starting in 1959), Margaret Hillis (starting 1971; first woman to conduct the Akron Symphony), Alan Balter (starting 1983), Keith Lockhart (starting 1988 as assistant conductor; Lockhart later went on to become music director of the Boston Pops Orchestra), and Ya-Hui Wang (starting 2000).

Benjamin Zander has guest conducted the Akron Symphony on multiple occasions, including in January 2019 (to conduct Tchaikovsky's Fourth Symphony), January 2017 (to conduct Beethoven's Ninth Symphony), and February 2008 (to conduct Mahler's Second Symphony). The encore performance of Mahler's Second Symphony by Zander, which occurred on February 10, 2008, was the Akron Symphony Orchestra's debut in Severance Hall.
