= Ligia Amadio =

Brazilian conductor

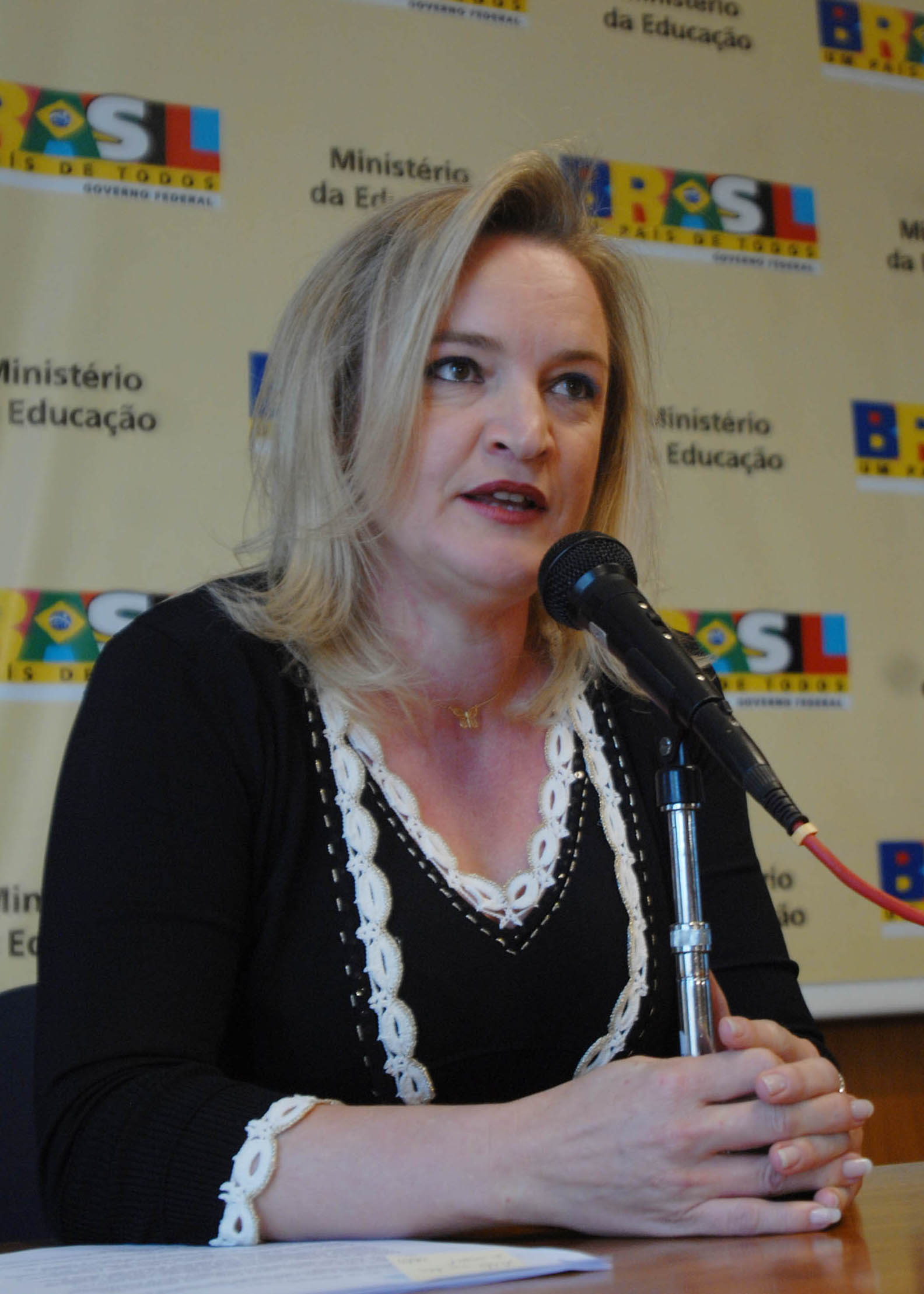
- Taken by: Marcello Casal Jr/ABr
- Born: Brazil
- Education: Pianist, Dramatic and Musical Conservatory of São Paulo; Bachelor of Conducting and Master Degree in Arts, State University of Campinas.
- Occupation: Chief conductor of the Orquestra Sinfônica de Minas Gerais
- Employer(s): National Symphony Orchestra, Rio de Janeiro; Hartwick College Summer Music Festival
- Known for: Chief conductor of the National Symphony Orchestra, Rio de Janeiro
- Title: Chief conductor of the Orquestra Sinfônica de Minas Gerais
- Term: 2014 -
- Predecessor: Enrique Diemecke
- Successor: in Office
- Website: www.ligiaamadio.net

Ligia Amadio is a Brazilian conductor, and has been the chief conductor of the Orquestra Sinfônica de Minas Gerais since March 8, 2023.

== Biography ==
=== Studies ===
Ligia Amadio began studying music at the age of five on the piano, eventually completing her diploma at the Dramatic and Musical Conservatory of São Paulo as a pianist. A few years later, however, Amadio received her Bachelor of Conducting as well as a master's degree in arts from the State University of Campinas. Her most important conducting teachers in Brazil and abroad were: Eleazar de Carvalho, Henrique Gregori, Hans-Joachim Koellreutter, Ferdinand Leitner, Kurt Masur, Julius Kalmar, Dominique Rouits, Georg Tintner, Alexander Polishuk, Eugeni Yergemsky, Guillermo Scarabino, and Edward Downes.

=== Musical career ===
Acclaimed for her high artistic standards, Ligia Amadio is considered by the critics as one of the finest conductors of her generation. She has been praised by huge artists of our time for her energetic, natural stage-presence and her versatile technical dexterity.

Ligia Amadio enjoys a successful career as a conductor, in light of over 20 years of performance experience, acquired from positions held as artistic director and guest conductor of major orchestras. For 12 years, from 1996 to 2008, she was the Chief Conductor of the National Symphony Orchestra of Rio de Janeiro. Between 2000 and 2003, Ms. Amadio also stepped up to the podium of the OSUNCUYO, in Mendoza (Argentina) and in 2009, she directed the Symphony Orchestra of Campinas (Brazil). In August of that year, at the request of the musicians, she took the baton of OSUSP, in São Paulo, Brazil. From 2010 to 2014, also at the request of the members, she was invited to take over the artistic directorship of the Philharmonic Orchestra of Mendoza, where she has been the chief conductor until 2014 when she was invited to be the Chief Conductor of the Bogotá Philharmonic Orchestra.

Ms. Amadio has been invited to guest conduct many of the world's finest orchestras. Highlights of her international conducting appearances include Netherlands Radio Symphony Orchestra, Tokyo City Philharmonic Orchestra, Simfoniki RTV Slovenija, Jerusalém Symphony Orchestra, Israel Chamber Orchestra, the Iceland Symphony Orchestra, State of México Symphony Orchestra, Sodre Symphony Orchestra, Thailand Philharmonic Orchestra, State of São Paulo Symphonic Orchestra, Baden-Badener Philharmonie, Buenos Aires Philharmonic Orchestra, Chile National Symphony Orchestra, Perú National Symphony Orchestra, Bogotá Philharmonic Orchestra, Orkiestrę Symfoniczną Filharmonii Szczecińskiej, Orkiestra Symfoniczna Filharmonii Czestochowskiej, Ensemble Contrechamps, Savaria Symphony Orchestra, The Congress Symphony Orchestra, Silesian Opera Orchestra, Arpeggione Städtisches Kammerorchester, Lebanese Philharmonic Orchestra, National Philharmonic of Moldova, in addition to the most important Brazilian and Argentinian orchestras.

In Japan, she was the first woman in 30 years to receive an award in the renowned Tokyo International Conducting Competition in 1997. In the following year, she won the 2nd Latin American Competition of Orchestra Conductors in Santiago, Chile. In the Netherlands, she was selected among the four best of 180 candidates from around the world to attend the 35th Kirill Kondrashin Masterclass, when she was honored to conduct the famous Concertgebouw in Amsterdam. In Brazil, Amadio was awarded by the São Paulo Association of Art Critics as the “Best Conductor of the Year” 2001. In 2012 she was distinguished again as “Best Conductor” by the Carlos Gomes Award, in Brazil.

Ligia Amadio has attended several international specialization courses of orchestral conducting, having important mentors such as Ferdinand Leitner, Kurt Masur, Sir Edward Downes and George Tintner. In Brazil, her main tutors were Eleazar de Carvalho, Henrique Gregori and Hans-Joachim Koellreutter.

Her discography includes eleven CDs and five DVDs, recorded under her direction, with the National Symphony Orchestra of Brazil, the Symphony Orchestra of RTV in Slovenia and the Symphony Orchestra of Cuyo National University). Between 2000 and 2003, Ligia produced and hosted a radio program dedicated to Music and Literature on Radio MEC (run by the Ministry of Education and Culture of Brazil).

In 2023, Ligia took up the place of chief conductor of the Minas Gerais Symphonic Orchestra.

== Sources ==
- Personal Site
