= Breaking at the 2018 Summer Youth Olympics =

Breaking at the III Summer Youth Olympic Games
- Venue: Parque Urbano, Puerto Madero
- Dates: 7–11 October
- No. of events: 3 (1 boys, 1 girls, 1 mixed)

Breaking at the 2018 Summer Youth Olympics was held from 7 to 11 October. The competition took place at Puerto Madero in Buenos Aires, Argentina. This marked the debut of dancesport at any edition of the Olympics.

== Qualification ==
Each National Olympic Committee (NOC) can enter a maximum of 2 competitors, 1 per each gender. As hosts, Argentina is given 2 quotas, 1 per each gender provided that they participate at the World Youth Breaking Championships. Four quotas, two per gender were initially to be decided by the tripartite committee, however, none were selected and the spots were reallocated to the 2018 World Youth Championship. The remaining places were decided at the 2018 World Youth Breaking Championship, with each continent guaranteed a spot at the games provided that they competed. There were no athletes from Africa or Oceania competing in B-Girls and Australia declined its quota in B-Boys.

To be eligible to participate at the Youth Olympics athletes must have been born between 1 January 2000 and 31 December 2002.

=== B-Boys ===
Event	Location	Date	Total Places	Qualified
Host Nation	-	-	1	Broly (ARG) (Mariano Carvajal)
2018 World Youth Breaking Championship	(Japan) Kawasaki	20 May 2018	11	Shigekix (JPN) (Shigeyuki Nakarai); Bumblebee (RUS) (Sergei Chernyshev); Axel (POL) (Piotr Winiarski); X-Rain (CHN) (Xiao Shang); Bad Matty (ITA) (Mattia Schinco); Reflow (BEL) (Olivier Warner); D-Matt (CAN) (Mathieu Du Ruisseau); KennyG (TPE) (Chien Chia-Cheng); Martin (FRA) (Martin Lejeune); B4 (VIE) (Lê Minh Hiếu); Jordan (RSA) (Jordan Smith) ^{^{1}}
TOTAL			12	

^^{1} Continental Quota

=== B-Girls ===
Event	Location	Date	Total Places	Qualified
Host Nation	-	-	1	Vale (ARG) (Iris Valeria González)
2018 World Youth Breaking Championship	(Japan) Kawasaki	20 May 2018	11	Ram (JPN) (Ramu Kawai); Yell (KOR) (Kim Ye-ri); Matina (RUS) (Kristina Yashina); Senorita Carlota (FRA) (Carlota Dudek); Lexy (ITA) (Alessandra Cortesia); Vicky (NED) (Vicky Bergmans); Emma (CAN) (Emma Misak); Ivy (CYP) (Irene Tanos); Anastasia (LAT) (Anastasia Solovjova); Ella (AUT) (Anna Thurner); Csepke (HUN) (Enikő Török)
TOTAL			12	

== Medal summary ==
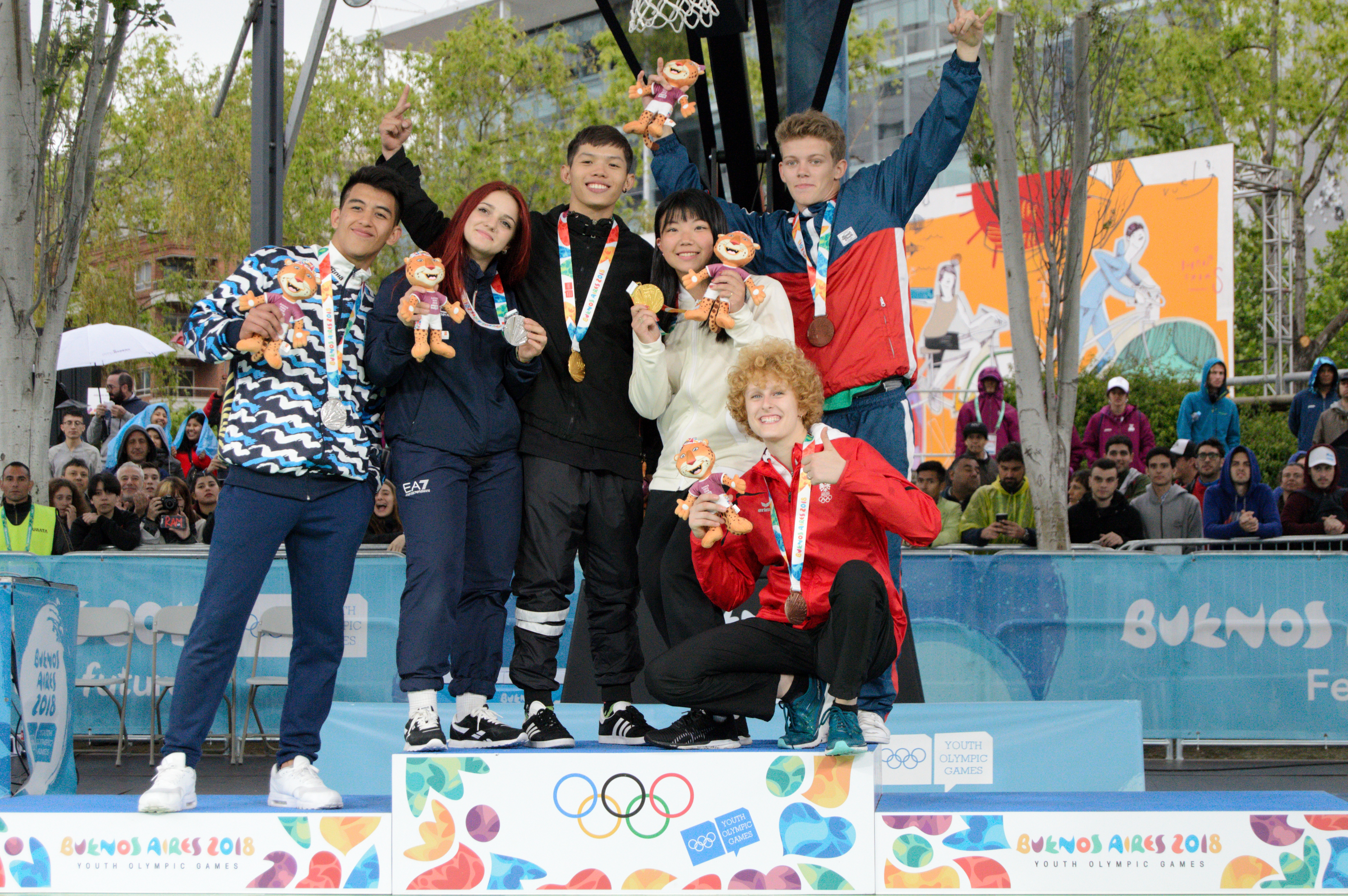
The Olympic medalists of the mixed international event.

=== Medal table ===
Rank	Nation	Gold	Silver	Bronze	Total
–	Mixed-NOCs	1	1	1	3
1	Japan	1	0	1	2
2	Russia	1	0	0	1
3	Canada	0	1	0	1
3	France	0	1	0	1
5	South Korea	0	0	1	1
Totals (5 entries)		3	3	3	9

=== Events ===
Event	Gold	Silver	Bronze
B-Boys'	Bumblebee; Russia	Martin; France	Shigekix; Japan
B-Girls'	Ram; Japan	Emma; Canada	Yell; South Korea
Breaking Mixed Team	Ram; Japan; B4; Vietnam	Lexy; Italy; Broly; Argentina	Ella; Austria; Bumblebee; Russia
