= Sergei Chernyshev (academic) =

Russian academic (born 1952)

- Сергей Борисович Чернышев
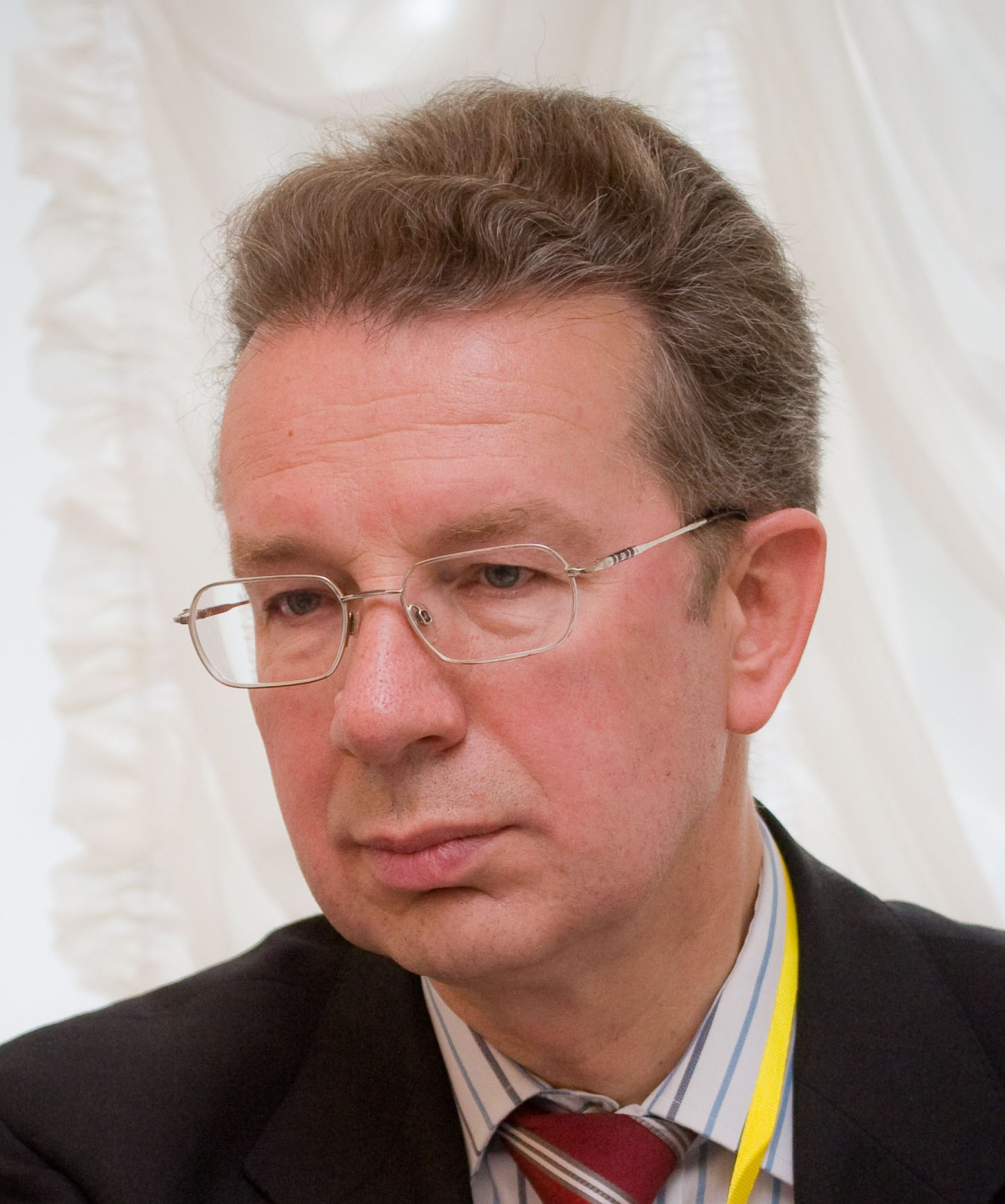
- Chernyshev in June 2008
- Born: 15 May 1955 (age 71); Bohodukhiv, Ukraine
- Education: Moscow Institute of Physics and Technology
- Website: chernyshev.ru

Sergei L Chernyshev (Russian: Серге́й Бори́сович Чернышёв, romanized: Sergey Borisovich Chernyshyov, born 15 May 1955), is from Bohodukhiv, Kharkiv Oblast, Ukrainian Soviet Socialist Republic. He is a Russian philosopher, educator and a scholar in the field of organization and management science.

== Early life and education ==
Chernyshev was born into a military family on 4 August 1952 and attended school in Akhtubinsk. He completed his graduation at the Moscow Institute of Physics and Technology in 1976 and worked as a management scientist at research centers, including at the USSR State Committee for Science and Technology and the State Committee for Construction. He received his M.S. Degree in aeronautical engineering in 1978. He did his PhD at Moscow PhysTech in 1981 and Senior Doctorate Degree in Physics & Mathematics at TsAGI in 2005.

== Career ==
From 1980 to 1987, he was an aide and academic advisor to the Chairman of the Committee of Youth Organizations of the USSR. Between 1983 and 1987, he also co-authored a series of classified papers for the then Soviet leadership. In 1989, after being declassified, they were published as a book, 'After Communism' under his pseudonym S.Platonov.

Between 1985 and 1991, Chernyshev was a founding member of “Project Space Shield”, which aimed to draw up a political and economic framework for a space-based anti-ballistic missile system to be developed, built and deployed jointly by the US and USSR.

In 1987, Chernyshev co-founded the Cultural Initiative Foundation, a body jointly established by the Soviet Cultural Foundation, the Peace Foundation, and the Soros Foundation, NY. For its first three years, Chernyshev led the organization as Executive Secretary of the Board. The foundation operated as an impact investing fund, supporting socially beneficial projects selected by competition.

From 1989 to 1993, Chernyshev was President of Humanus, a think tank. In 1990, his work New Milestones (Новые Вехи) was published under his own name for the first time, in issue #1 for that year of the journal “Znamya”.

From 1996 to 2006, he was the Professor and Head of the Institute for Corporate Entrepreneurship at State University – Higher School of Economics. In 1996, together with Yaroslav Kuzminov and Gleb Pavlovsky, he founded the Russian Institute and he has been CEO of the Institute since its inception.

In 2008, he directed a research project to analyze the efficiency of government property management in the industrial and energy sectors, commissioned by the Ministry of Industry and Trade of Russian Federation. From 2010 to 2014, he accepted a position on the Public Council of the Ministry of Industry and Trade of Russian Federation. In 2011, he co authored the monograph for TsAGI: Russia`s Global Aerospace Research Center. From 2012 to 2015, he became Director of the Center for Corporate Entrepreneurship at the Moscow Institute of Physics and Technology (MIPT).

He has been working at TsAGI for over 30 years in various research and management positions, including as Executive Director and General Director. Since August 2018, he is the Chief Scientific Officer of TsAGI.

He is the author of eight books (three of them co-authored) and over 170 articles.

== Awards ==
- Many National awards from the Russian Government.
- Aviation Week & Space Technology Laurels Award for contributions to Global Aerospace 2000 (2001)
- The French National Order of Merit (2012),
- ICAS – Daniel and Florence Guggenheim Award (2014).
