= Chloé Dufresne =

French conductor

Chloé Dufresne (born 1991, Montpellier) is a French conductor.

== Biography ==
Raised in the Montpellier neighbourhood of La Chamberte, Dufresne studied singing and piano as a youth, and began viola studies at age eight. She also sang in the children's choir of the Opéra national de Montpellier. She continued her music studies at the Sibelius Academy, where her teachers included Sakari Oramo. Dufresne earned a bachelor's degree and subsequently a master's degree from the Sibelius Academy. For a year, she continued her conducting studies with Alain Altinoglu at the Conservatoire de Paris.

In 2020, Dufresne was a finalist in the Siemens-Hallé Competition in Manchester. In 2021, she won third prize at the Malko Competition, and two coups de cœur prizes (audience and orchestral) and as well as a "special mention" at the International Besançon Competition for Young Conductors.

Dufresne was one of the three finalist nominees for the 2022 Victoires de la Musique Classique Awards. She was an assistant conductor and Dudamel Fellow with the Los Angeles Philharmonic for the 2022–2023 season. In June 2022, the Orchestre Ostinato announced the appointment of a collective of five musicians, including Dufresne, to oversee the ensemble's artistic direction.

In January 2024, Dufresne first guest-conducted the Colorado Springs Philharmonic. In July 2025, the orchestra announced the appointment of Dufresne as its next music director, effective with the 2025–2026 season, with an initial contract of three seasons. This appointment marks her first music directorship. Dufresne is the first female conductor to be named music director of the Colorado Springs Philharmonic.

Dufresne and her family live in Paris.

Cultural offices
Preceded by Josep Caballé Domenech	Music Director, Colorado Springs Philharmonic; 2025–present	Succeeded by incumbent
