= Sergei Chernyshev (breakdancer) =

Russian breakdancer

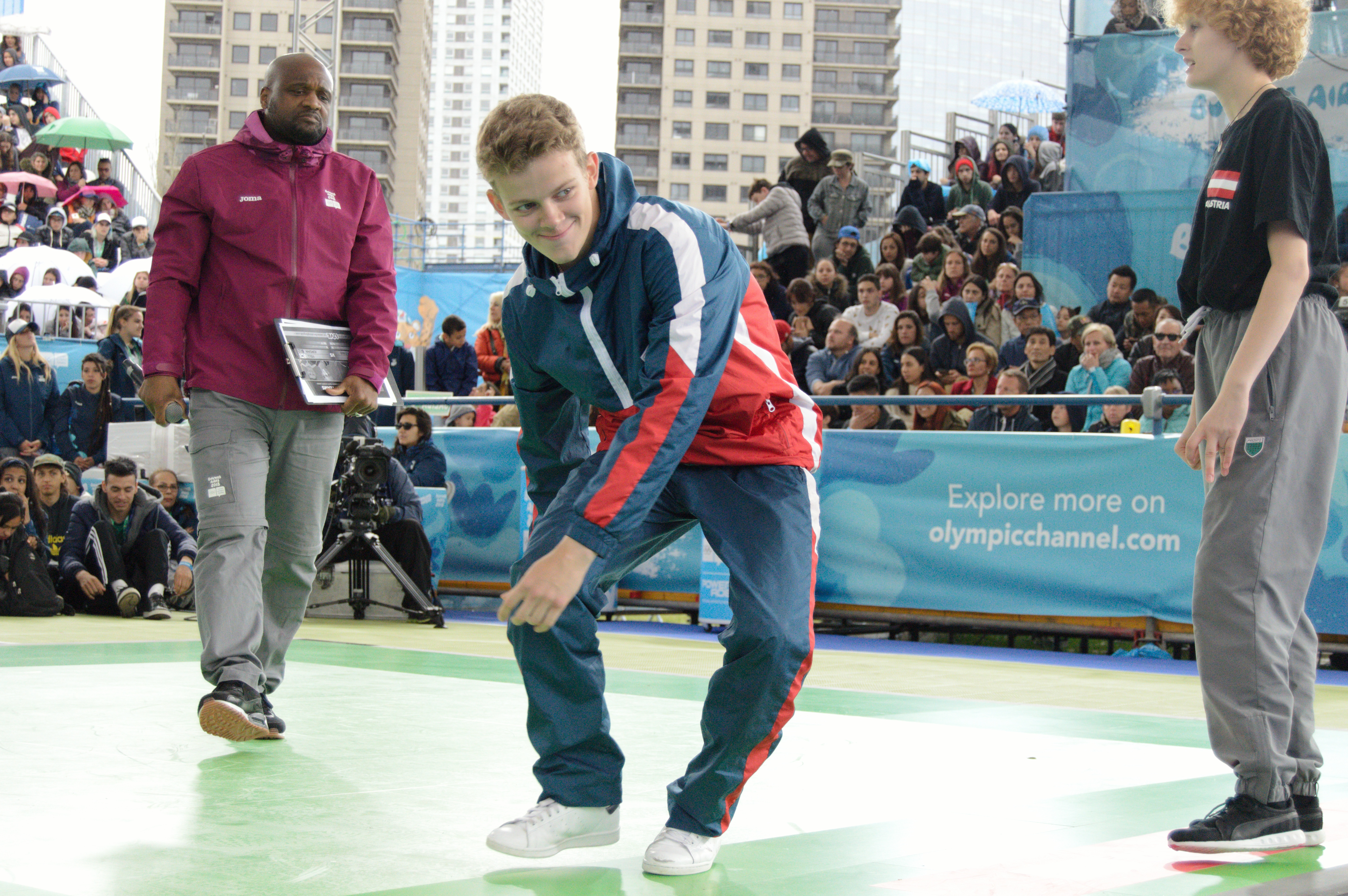
- Chernyshev at the 2018 Summer Youth Olympics

Personal information
- Native name: Сергей Чернышев
- Nickname: Bumblebee
- Nationality: Russian
- Born: 27 June 2000 (age 26) Voronezh, Russia

Sport
- Country: Russia
- Sport: Dancesport
- Event: Breakdancing
- Coached by: Sergei Chernyshev, Sr.
Medal record
Dancesport
Representing Russia
Youth Olympic Games
Gold medal – first place	2018 Buenos Aires	B-Boys
Representing (International Olympic Committee) Mixed-NOCs
Youth Olympic Games
Bronze medal – third place	2018 Buenos Aires	Mixed team breakdancing

Sergei Chernyshev (Russian: Сергей Чернышев, b. 27 June 2000, Voronezh, Russia), a.k.a. Bumblebee, is a Russian competitive breakdancer. Chernyshev, competing under the nickname 'Bumblebee', won the individual B-Boys gold medal at the 2018 Summer Youth Olympics, where breakdancing made its debut as a part of the Youth Olympics.

== Life and career ==
Sergei Chernyshev's father, also named Sergei Chernyshev, was one of the first organizers of breakdancing in Voronezh in 1990s. From the age of four the younger Chernyshev was doing gymnastics. In 2009 his parents opened a dance studio "Infinity" in Voronezh, and Chernyshev switched to breakdancing that year, at the age of nine. Chernyshev continues to train there, with his father as coach.

Sergei Chernyshev participated in two seasons of the dancing competition show "Tantsy" on the Russian television channel TNT.

Chernyshev competes in breakdancing competitions under the moniker 'Bumblebee', named after Bumblebee, a robot superhero in the Transformers franchise.

Chernyshev qualified for participation in the 2018 Summer Youth Olympics by taking the 2-nd place at the 2018 World Youth Breaking Championship in Kawasaki, Japan.

At the 2018 Summer Youth Olympics in Buenos Aires, dancesport made its first appearance as a part of the games' competition program, with medals being contested in breakdancing. Sergei Chernyshev, competing as Bumblebee, won the individual gold medal in the B-Boys competition. Bumblebee also won the bronze medal in the Mixed Team breakdancing, competing together with an Austrian B-Girl Ella. Chernyshev was the flag bearer for the Russian national team at the closing ceremony of the 2018 Summer Youth Olympics.

Chernyshev is a student of the construction faculty of Voronezh State Technical University (VGTU).

Chernyshev plans to continue competing in breakdancing at least until the 2024 Summer Olympics in Paris, where breakdancing will for the first time feature as a part of the competition program.
