= Valentin Petit =

French filmmaker (1990–2023)

- Born: 22 May 1990; Bourges, France
- Died: 20 May 2023 (aged 32); La Chaux-de-Fonds, Switzerland
- Education: Paris 8 University Vincennes-Saint-Denis
- Occupation: Filmmaker

Valentin Petit (22 May 1990 – 20 May 2023) was a French filmmaker. He was known for directing films, commercials and music videos for both French and international artists. Valentin Petit also owned a production company called Ocurens and a post production company Monumental FX.

== Biography ==
Born in Bourges on 22 May 1990, Petit studied graphic design at the Lycée Jean-Monnet and earned a degree in cinematography from Paris 8 University Vincennes-Saint-Denis.

In 2015, Petit released his first short film, Antophobia, which was shown at several critically acclaimed film festivals. In 2017, he released his second short film, titled Bruit de la lumière.

On 20 May 2023, Petit died in a plane crash near La Chaux-de-Fonds. He was two days away from his 33rd birthday.

== Filmography ==
=== Music videos ===
- "Temps Mort" by Everydayz (2011)
- "Ailleurs" by Némir and Deen Burbigo (2012)
- "Wake up" by Némir and Alpha Wann (2012)
- "L'absence" by Everydayz (2013)
- "Louis XIV" by Joke (2013)
- "Kush" by Set&Match (2014)
- "Risibles Amours" by Nekfeu (2015)
- "L'année la plus chaude" by Raphael (2017)
- "Marsellus Wallace" by Prince Waly (2018)
- "Normal" by Roméo Elvis (2019)
- "Doggy Bag" by Pringe Waly (2019)
- "Floor Seats" by ASAP Ferg (2019)
- "Moment" by Victoria Monét (2020)
- "Green Juice" by ASAP Ferg and Pharrell Williams (2021)
- "Saoko" by Rosalía (2022)
- "Locket" by Audrey Nuna (2023)

=== Short films ===
- Antophobia (2015)
- Le Bruit De La Lumière (2018)

=== Documentaries ===
- Portrait de Rafel Delalande (2016)
