= Eduardo Diazmuñoz =

Mexican-American conductor and composer

Eduardo Diazmuñoz is a highly prolific Mexican-Spanish-American conductor, composer and arranger, performer and educator. He studied piano, cello, percussion, and conducting at the National Conservatory of Music (Mexico). In 1978, 1979 he became associate conductor of the newly founded the Mexico City Philharmonic Orchestra. Bernstein invited him to Tanglewood in 1979. He assisted in preparation for concertos of Leonard Bernstein and Eduardo Mata. In 1980-1982 assisted Léon Barzin in Paris.

Diazmuñoz made his debut at Palacio de Bellas Artes in Mexico City at 22. Diazmuñoz considers Barzin, Bernstein, and Francisco Savín were his principal mentors in conducting, in Paris, Tanglewood and Mexico City respectively.

Diazmuñoz has conducted orchestras worldwide. He has received numerous awards and prizes. While still a student he was awarded the Youth Value 1975 Award given by the President of Mexico. He was awarded the Mexican Union of Theatre and Music Chronicles Award an unprecedented four times, (1978, 1987, 1997, and 2002). In 2003 he was also presented with the 2003 International Musician of the Year, awarded by the International Biographical Centre based in Cambridge, England. He was nominated in 2000, for a Latin Grammy award in the Best Classical Album Category, for the first volume of his collection Twentieth Century Mexican Symphonic Music, a four CD collection, making him the first Mexican conductor to be nominated. In 2001, he received his second nomination in the same category for his album "Tango Mata Danzón Mata Tango". In 2008, at the 9th Annual Latin Grammy Awards, Diazmuñoz (as conductor) and the Orquesta Filarmónica de Bogotá received the Latin Grammy Award for Best Instrumental Album, for the album Orquesta Filarmónica de Bogotá – 40 Años.

As a composer and arranger, his works have been premiered and recorded in various cities of Europe and America. He has written many compositions for television, theater, and films. In 2010 he composed, conducted, produced and performed the score for the Mexican feature film Espíritu de Triunfo (Spirit of Triumph).

As an educator Diazmuñoz has held full-time positions at the National Autonomous University (UNAM) and the National Conservatory in Mexico City, the Société Philharmonique in Paris, as well as at the New World School of the Arts in Miami, Florida. From 2004 to 2014, he was Artistic and Music Director of the Opera Division at the University of Illinois in Urbana-Champaign where he built a well known Opera program. From 2013 to 2018 he was in charge of the Conducting Division at the Sydney Conservatorium, teaching at the Masters and Doctorate levels, while being the Artistic Director and Chief Conductor of the institution's Symphony Orchestra as well.

Since 2019 he has been General, Artistic Director and Chief Conductor of the Nuevo Leon Autonomous University Symphony Orchestra based in Monterrey, Nuevo Leon, Mexico.

Diazmuñoz's discography includes 37 recordings for two dozen labels. He is the first Mexican conductor to receive two Golden Discs and a Platinum Disc for the Albums el Tri Sinfónico.
