= Enrique Diemecke =

Mexican conductor, violinist and composer

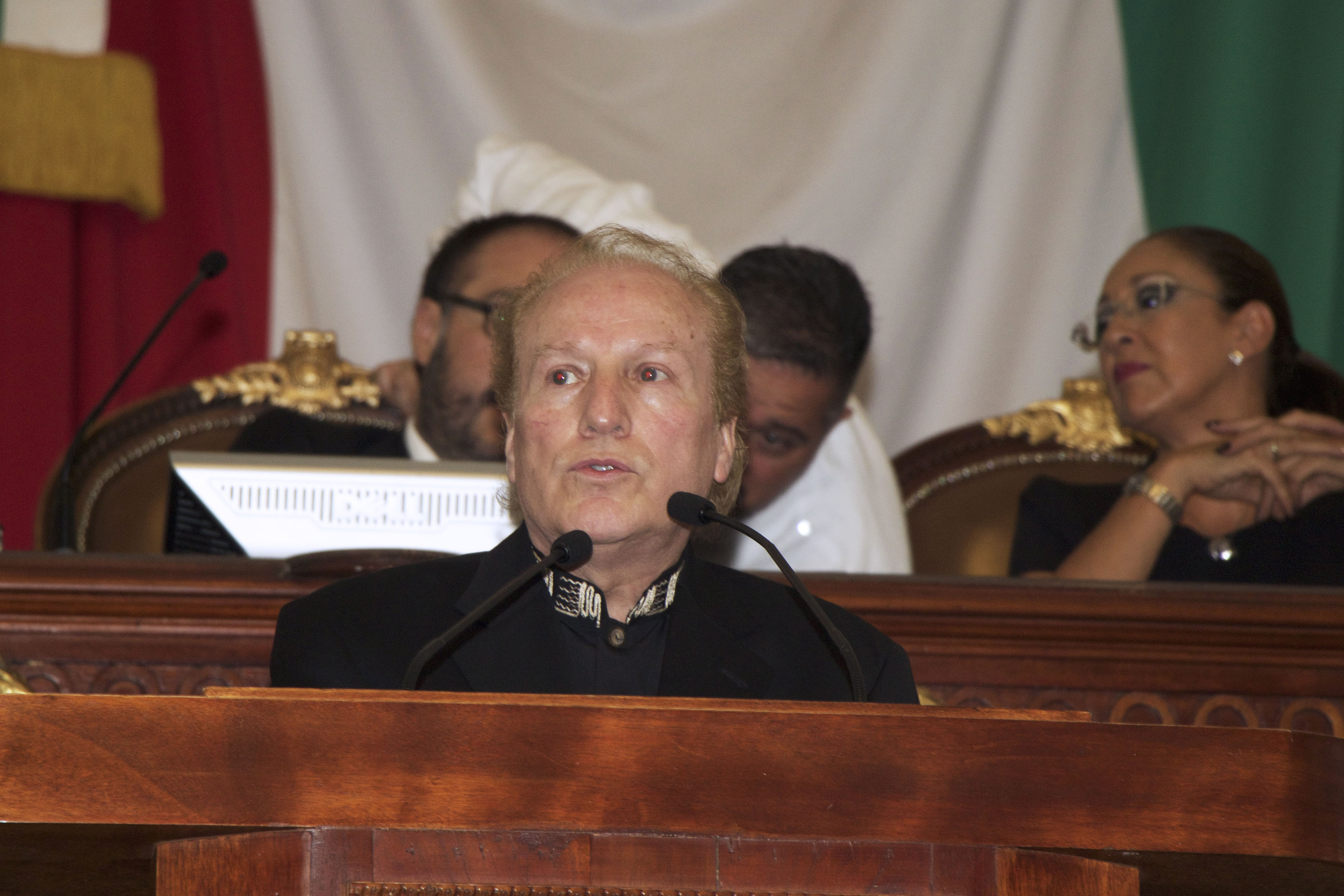
Enrique Diemecke receiving an award in Mexico City on 2017.

Enrique Arturo Diemecke (born July 9, 1952) is a Mexican conductor, violinist and composer. He is currently the Artistic General Director of the Teatro Colón in Buenos Aires and music director of the Buenos Aires Philharmonic and the Flint Symphony Orchestra in Michigan, United States.

== Biography ==
Diemecke was born in Guanajuato, Mexico to Emilio Diemecke, a professional cellist and Carmen Diemecke (Née Rodriguez) a pianist. Diemecke is one of eight musician siblings, their father was also born into a family of musicians from Leipzig, Germany. He began to play the violin at the age of six and at the age of nine he began to play the French horn, piano and percussion. He studied at Catholic University in Washington, D.C., and with Charles Bruck at the Pierre Monteux School for Advanced Conductors. He studied violin in Mexico with Henryk Szeryng. In 1983, he was selected as an Exxon Arts Endowment Conductor and began his professional conducting career at the Rochester Philharmonic Orchestra. He was then appointed Resident Conductor of the Saint Paul Chamber Orchestra.

Maestro Diemecke is a frequent guest of orchestras throughout the world, most notably the National Symphony Orchestra in Washington, San Francisco Symphony Orchestra, French National Orchestra, BBC Symphony, Royal Philharmonic Orchestra, L’Orchestre de Paris, Residentie Orkest in The Hague, Los Angeles Philharmonic, the Warsaw Philharmonic, the Queensland Symphony Orchestra in Brisbane, the Russian National Orchestra, the Bogota Philharmonic, the Puerto Rico Symphony, Simon Bolivar Orchestra in Caracas, Orchestre National de Lorraine, the National Orchestra of Montpellier, the Valladolid Symphony, ORCAM Madrid, Orchestre de Isle de France, and the symphony orchestras of Baltimore, Houston, Minnesota, and Auckland.

Maestro Diemecke is an experienced conductor of opera, having served as music director of the Opera de Bellas Artes in Mexico City from 1986 to 1990, where he led more than 20 productions including Faust, La bohème, Salome, Elektra, Ariadne auf Naxos, Der fliegende Hollander, Rigoletto, Turandot, Madama Butterfly, and Roméo et Juliette. He has since returned as a guest conductor with new productions of Lohengrin, Boris Godunov, and Gluck's Orfeo ed Euridice.

Diemecke returned to opera as he opened the 2007–2008 season of the Teatro Colón in Buenos Aires with a new production of Werther, followed by performances of Massenet's Le Jongleur de Notre Dame with tenor Roberto Alagna in Montpellier, which was released by Deutsche Grammophon and awarded the prestigious Grand Prix de l'Academie du Disque Lyrique. He is a regular guest of the famed Teatro Zarzuela in Madrid, and was awarded the Jean Fontaine Orpheus d’Or Gold Medal for “best vocal music recording” by France's Academy of Lyric Recordings for his recording of Donizetti's The Exiles of Siberia with the L’Orchestre Philharmonique de Montpellier-Languedoc-Roussillon. Maestro Diemecke was previously honored with a Gold Medal from the Academy of Lyric Recordings with the Bruno Walter Orpheus d’Or Prize for “Best Opera Conductor” for his live recording of Mascagni's Parisina, from the Radio France Festival.

With 16 years at the helm of the Orquesta Sinfónica Nacional de México, Maestro Diemecke led the ensemble on a ten-city tour of the United States, culminating with a program of Latin American masterworks at New York's Carnegie Hall. He and the Orquesta Sinfónica Nacional de México were nominated for “Best Classical Album” for the 3rd Annual Latin Grammy Awards, for their recording of Carlos Chávez’ Violin and Piano Concertos with violinist Pablo Diemecke and pianist Jorge Federico Osorio.

He is also frequently invited to festivals such as the Lincoln Center Summer Festival, the Hollywood Bowl Festival, Wolf Trap, Autumno Musicale a Como (Italy), Europalia (Brussels), World Fair Expo Sevilla (Spain), Festival International Radio France, and the World Orchestra Festival in Moscow where he led the Bogota Philharmonic.

Maestro Diemecke is an accomplished composer and orchestral arranger, and has conducted his Die-Sir-E, during the Mexican National Symphony Orchestra tour of the U.S. in 1999. The Die-Sir-E was commissioned by the Radio France Festival for the World Cup Final Concert in France in 1998. Maestro Diemecke was commissioned to write a tone poem for the Flint Symphony Orchestra, and his works Chacona a Chávez and Guitar Concerto have received many performances both in Europe and in the United States. During the 2001–2002 season, he gave the world premiere of his work Camino y vision, dedicated to President Vicente Fox, with the Tulsa Philharmonic. For 13 years he served as the music director of the Long Beach Symphony Orchestra.

Recordings of the music of Revueltas, Chávez, and Moncayo for Sony/Mexico with the Orquesta Sinfónica Nacional de México have been best-sellers in Mexico, earning Maestro Diemecke and orchestra the Golden Record Award. Other releases have included the music of Villa-Lobos and Silvestre Revueltas on the Dorian label with the Simon Bolivar Symphony Orchestra of Venezuela. In these recordings, as well as in his concert performance, Maestro Diemecke has earned particular renown as a pioneering advocate of the music of Chávez and Revueltas, Mexico's greatest composers, and his CD of Revueltas’ masterwork La noche de los Mayas has become a recording classic. Maestro Diemecke's recording with the Flint Symphony Orchestra of the 1896 version of Mahler's First Symphony (which includes the subsequently deleted “Blumine” movement) was nominated for a Grammy Award.
