= Christopher Wilkins =

American conductor

Christopher Wilkins (born 1957) is an American music director, conductor, oboist, and a 1992 Seaver/NEA Award recipient.

== Biography ==
Wilkins was born in Boston, Massachusetts where by 1978 he obtained bachelor's degree from Harvard College He studied with German-born conductor Otto-Werner Mueller while being enrolled into Yale University and got his Master of Music degree from there by 1981. Two years before it he traveled to West Berlin where he attended Berlin University of the Arts and the same year was awarded John Knowles Paine fellowship from Harvard University. In his hometown he had performances with orchestras like Berkshire Music Center at Tanglewood estate and Boston Philharmonic Orchestra which was guided by Benjamin Zander. Later on he assisted Joseph Silverstein at Utah Symphony where he served as an associate conductor, and then, under guidance from Christoph von Dohnányi was an assistant conductor of the Cleveland Orchestra. He has been music director of the Akron Symphony Orchestra since 2006.

Under guidance from James DePreist he became an Oregon Symphony's conducting assistant. He also served as the music director of both the Colorado Springs and San Antonio Symphonies orchestras and as of now is an artistic director to the Opera Theatre of the Rockies in Colorado Springs. As a YOA Orchestra of the Americas residential conductor he has conducted at such cities as Chicago, Cincinnati, Cleveland, Dallas, Detroit, Houston, Indianapolis, Los Angeles, Pittsburgh, and San Francisco and also performed overseas in such countries as New Zealand, Spain, the United Kingdom and in various countries of Latin America. Besides national and international conducting he also was a conductor for various music centers and schools such as the Villa Victoria Center for the Arts in the South End and the Conservatory Lab Charter School among many others. In 2013 he collaborated with Commonwealth Shakespeare Company, the Boston Lyric Opera and the New England Spiritual Ensemble to assemble a chorus out of all 21 neighborhoods of Boston.

== Awards ==
- 1992 — Nigeria Entertainment Awards
- Morton Gould Award
- ASCAP
