= Ramu Kawai =

Japanese Olympic breakdancer

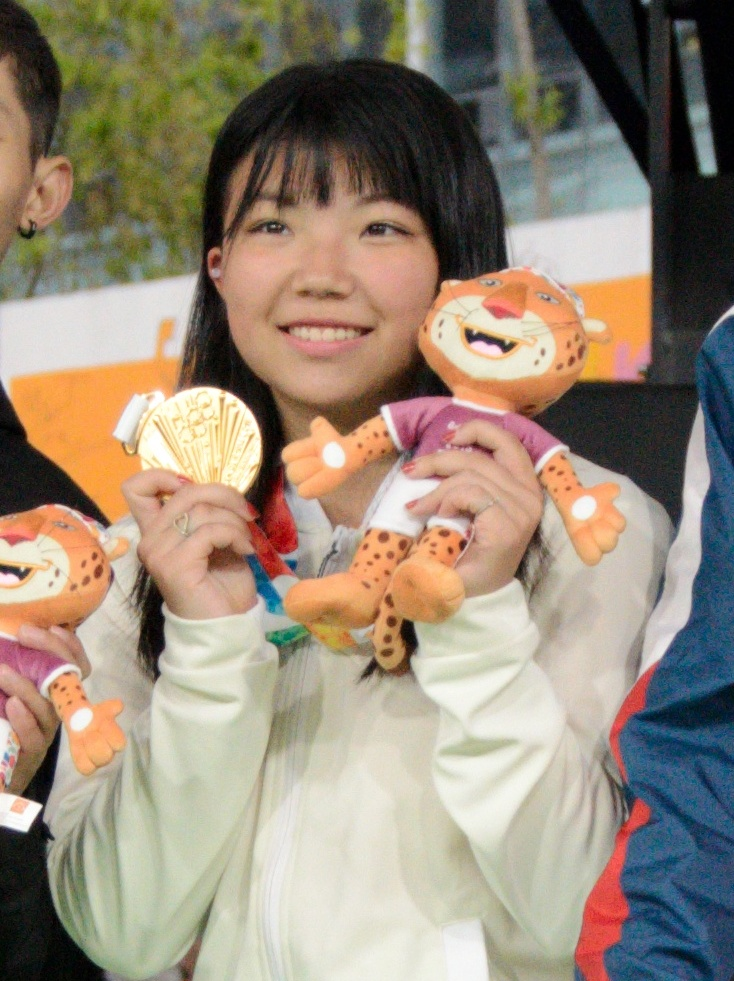
- Kawai in 2018

Personal information
- Born: 11 April 2001 Kanagawa, Japan

Sport
- Country: Japan
- Sport: Breakdancing
Medal record
Breakdancing
Representing Japan
Youth Olympic Games
Gold medal – first place	2018 Buenos Aires	B-Girls'
Gold medal – first place	2018 Buenos Aires	Breaking Mixed Team

Ramu Kawai (born 11 April 2001), also known as Ram, is a Japanese Olympic breakdancer. She participated at the 2018 Summer Youth Olympics in the dancesport competition, being awarded the gold medal in the B-Girls' event. Kawai also participated in the breaking mixed event, being awarded the gold medal with her teammate, Lê Minh Hiếu. She attended Kanagawa Prefectural Yurigaoka High School.
