= Leonid Nikolaev (disambiguation) =

Leonid Nikolaev or Nikolayev may refer to:

- Leonid Nikolayev (pianist) (1878–1942), Russian composer and academic
- Leonid Nikolaev (1904–1934), Russian assassin of Sergei Kirov
- Leonid Nikolaev (conductor) (1940–2009), Russian musicologist and academic
- Leonid Nikolayev (1984–2015), Russian member of dissident art group Voina
