= Anna Sułkowska–Migoń =

Anna Sułkowska–Migoń is a Polish conductor.

She was born in Kraków and studied music at the Krzysztof Penderecki Academy of Music in Kraków.

Anna Sułkowska–Migoń has trained with conductors such as Marin Alsop, François-Xavier Roth, Klaus Mäkelä, Stéphane Denève, Kirill Karabits, Jerzy Maksymiuk, Piotr Sułkowski and Antoni Wit.

Since winning the La Maestra conducting competition she has appeared regularly with all the major Polish orchestras, and many further orchestras in North America and Europe. These include the Québec Symphony, the Minnesota Orchestra, the San Diego Symphony Orchestra, and the St Louis Symphony Orchestra. In Europe she has conducted the Orchestre Philharmonique de Radio France, the National Symphony Orchestra of Ireland, the Orchestre National de Lille, the Orchestre Philharmonique de Nice, and the Ulster Orchestra.

She has conducted works featuring such soloists as James Ehnes, Pacho Flores, Isata Kanneh-Mason, Andrè Schuen and Josef Špaček.

== Awards ==
Anna Sułkowska–Migoń was placed first in the La Maestra conducting competition in Paris in March 2022. Also in 2022 she was a Taki Award Recipient through the Taki Alsop Conducting Fellowship events. In 2023, she was awarded the Neeme Järvi Prize at the Gstaad Conducting Academy.
