= Los Angeles Philharmonic Institute =

The Los Angeles Philharmonic Institute was a summer training program held in Los Angeles, California for conservatory aged orchestral instrumentalists and conductors. It ran from 1982 to 1991 under the auspices of the Los Angeles Philharmonic.

== History ==
The Los Angeles Philharmonic Institute was founded by Ernest Fleischmann and Leonard Bernstein, with Bernstein and Daniel Lewis serving as artistic directors. Subsequent artistic directors have included Michael Tilson Thomas, Sir Charles Groves, André Previn, Lukas Foss, and finally Lynn Harrell (1988–1992).

Most of the faculty were musicians from the Los Angeles Philharmonic, but also included many other prominent musicians, including Vladimir Spivakov, Nadja Salerno-Sonnenberg, Erich Leinsdorf, Edo de Waart, Leonard Slatkin, and Jesús López-Cobos, among others.

The institute was notable for the amount of daily, hands-on instruction students received from faculty, even when compared to other similar summer programs, such as Tanglewood. Lynn Harrell said, "Not only do the students have an almost daily open working situation with Philharmonic players, but they'll have the opportunity to join them in performance [at the Hollywood Bowl].... To sit next to experienced orchestra musicians and play with that kind of immediacy is worth a thousand words. There's a give-and-take here on many levels."

In December 1991, Fleischmann announced that the 1992 Institute would be cancelled due to budget cuts by the philharmonic.

== Notable alumni ==
=== Conducting Fellows ===
- Gisele Ben-Dor
- Thomas Dausgaard
- Paavo Järvi
- Yakov Kreizberg
- Jahja Ling
- Keith Lockhart
- David Alan Miller
- Keith Lockhart
- Eiji Oue
- Stefan Sanderling
- Toshiyuki Shimada
- Michael Stern
- Mario Venzago
- Leif Bjaland
- William Eddins

=== Strings ===
- Carolyn Waters Broe
- Tatjana Mead Chamis (Associate Principal Viola, Pittsburgh Symphony)
- Ben Hong (Associate Principal Cello, Los Angeles Philharmonic)
- Ingrid Hutman (Viola, Los Angeles Philharmonic)
- Eric Lee (Associate Concertmaster, Kennedy Center Opera House Orchestra)
- Charles Bingham, Solista Bilbao Symphony Orchestra since 1995- current.
- Josefina Vergara (Principal Second Violin, Los Angeles Chamber Orchestra)
- Glen Wanner (Assistant Principal Bass, Nashville Symphony)

=== Woodwinds ===
- Sue Heineman (Principal Bassoon, National Symphony)
- Marni Hougham, (English horn, Minnesota Orchestra)
- Susan McGinn (Principal Flute, Honolulu Symphony)
- Theodore Soluri, (Principal Bassoon, Dallas Symphony)
- Philip Dikeman, (Former Acting Principal Flute, Detroit Symphony, Associate Professor Vanderbilt University)
- Michael Lisicky, (Oboe, Baltimore Symphony)
- Nancy Ambrose King, (Professor of Oboe, University of Michigan)
- Lee Livengood, (Bass clarinet, Utah Symphony)

=== Brass ===
- Elizabeth Cook-Shen (former Horn, Los Angeles Philharmonic)
- Dai Zhonghui (Principal Trumpet, National Symphony Orchestra of China)
- Matthew Guilford (Bass Trombone, National Symphony)
- Brian Rood (Trumpet, Kansas City Symphony)
- David Washburn (Principal Trumpet, Los Angeles Chamber Orchestra)
