= Akira Endo (conductor) =

Japanese-American conductor

Maestro Akira Endo 遠藤 明
- Born: November 16, 1938; Shido, Japan
- Died: April 3, 2014 (aged 75)
- Occupation(s): Conductor, music educator
- Instrument: Violin

Akira Endo (遠藤 明, Endō Akira) (16 November 1938 – 3 April 2014) was a Japanese-American conductor and music educator. Maestro Endo held conducting posts with the American Ballet Theatre, Westside Orchestra, Long Beach Symphony Orchestra, Louisville Orchestra, Austin Symphony Orchestra, San Antonio Symphony Orchestra, Houston Symphony, Hamilton Philharmonic Orchestra, and the Pittsburgh Ballet Theatre.

== Biography ==
Endo was born to Hikataro and Reiko Endo on November 16, 1938 in Shido, Japan. His family moved to the United States in 1954. After finishing high school, he studied music at the University of Southern California. He was a concertmaster from 1960 to 1962 and graduated Cum Laude. He took a Master's degree in violin performance in the same university.

=== Music educator ===
After school, he worked as music professor at Long Beach City College. He appeared as guest conductor of the Dallas Symphony Orchestra, the Detroit Symphony Orchestra, the Milwaukee Symphony Orchestra, the Louisiana Philharmonic, the Minnesota Orchestra, the New York Philharmonic, the Philadelphia Orchestra, the Utah Symphony Orchestra, as well as orchestras in Central and South America.

As a devoted music educator, he also appeared as guest conductor for the Colorado, Illinois, Indiana, Oklahoma, and Texas All-State High School Honor Orchestras. Endo was a visiting professor at such institutions as Stanford University (Palo Alto, California), Rice University (Houston, Texas), California State University, Long Beach, Duquesne University (Pittsburgh, Pennsylvania), and the University of Oklahoma. One of his noted students include John Roscigno, who is also a music educator and conductor. Maestro Endo was Director of Orchestral Studies at the University of Colorado at Boulder as well as the conductor of the Colorado Ballet until his retirement. Prior to his post at Colorado, he served as the director of orchestral activities and as chairman of the Department of Instrumental Performance at the University of Miami.

=== Conductor ===
Maestro Endo twice received prizes from the Dimitri Mitropoulos International Competition for Conductors at Carnegie Hall and ASCAP for adventuresome programming with the Louisville Orchestra. The awards launched his national prominence as they drew the attention of Leonard Bernstein, who recommended him to the conductor position at the American Ballet Theatre (ABT). Maestro Endo assumed directorship of ABT Orchestra in March 1969. He enjoyed an illustrious career with the American Ballet Theatre, remaining for ten years, during which time he worked with many major dancers from around the world, most notably Margot Fonteyn and Rudolf Nureyev. He also led the western debut performances of both Mikhail Baryshnikov and Natalia Makarova. In 1990 Patricia Wilde invited Akiro to Become the music director at Pittsburgh Ballet Theatre where he onducted for ten years. In 2000 he moved to Boulder Colorado to teach and conduct.

In Europe, most notably, he conducted the Tivoli Symphony Orchestra in the Tivoli Gardens in Copenhagen, Denmark, as well as orchestras at the Santander Festival in Spain, Athens Festival in Greece, the Arena de Verona in Italy, the Nervis Festival in Genoa, and at the Edinburgh Festival with the Royal Scottish National Orchestra.

Endo conducted one of the first Live from Lincoln Center programs in 1976 — a live, televised, complete production of Tchaikovsky's Swan Lake, starring Mme. Makarova and Ivan Nagy with American Ballet Theatre. It was simulcast in FM stereo on NPR, and because it was televised live, complete with three twenty-minute intermissions, was quite possibly the longest ballet telecast ever shown in the United States up to that time (three and a half hours counting the intermissions). Although it was initially released commercially in both the VHS and laser disc formats, it is currently unavailable. Endo earned a Grammy nomination for his recording of the 20th Double-Reed Music for Crystal Records with members of the Los Angeles Philharmonic.
