= Rebecca Tong =

Indonesian conductor (born 1984)

Rebecca Tong (born 1984 in Malang, Java, Indonesia) is an Indonesian and American conductor.

== Life ==
Rebecca Tong's parents are musicians of Chinese origin. In early childhood, her mother taught her to play the piano; her father, Stephen Tong, is a conductor. Later, she received musical training in the United States and played in an orchestra. In 2006, at the age of 22, she began conducting. She earned her Master's degree in concert conducting from the College-Conservatory of Music in Cincinnati under the tutelage of Mark Gibson. She also participated in masterclasses with, among others, Leon Fleisher, Gustav Meier, Mark Elder, and Roberto Paternostro.

In 2011, she founded the Jakarta Christian Youth Orchestra, which she has conducted ever since. From 2009 to 2012, she taught music as a lecturer at the International Reformed Evangelical Seminary. She is Conductor in Residence at the Jakarta Symphony Orchestra. Among other engagements, she conducted the Asian premiere of Marjan Mozetich's Concerto for Harp Duo and Orchestra in Jakarta. In 2018, she conducted the Indonesian premiere of Hector Berlioz's Symphonie fantastique.

In 2017, she received the David Effron Fellowship from the Chautauqua Institution in collaboration with Timothy Muffitt and the Music School Festival Orchestra. In 2018, she was an associate member of the artistic direction of the Cabrillo Festival under the direction of Cristian Măcelaru. From 2018 to 2020, she was a fellow at the Royal Northern College of Music (RNCM) and chief assistant in the opera department at the college. She has conducted with the BBC Philharmonic and the Royal Liverpool Philharmonic. In 2019, she became a laureate of the Taki Concordia Conducting Fellowship. This enabled her to work intensively with Marin Alsop.

In 2019, she conducted Vaughan Williams' opera The Pilgrim's Progress and Francis Poulenc's opera Dialogues des Carmélites at the RNCM. In May of the same year, she was music director of a Carmen production at the City Lyric Opera in New York.

In September 2020, she won the La Maestra competition for emerging female conductors. In November 2020, she conducted Wolfgang Amadeus Mozart's Oboe Concerto in C major, K. 314, with Alexandre Gattet as solo oboist, and Gustav Mahler's Symphony No. 4 in G major with soprano Sabine Devieilhe in the final movement. The concert was streamed on Arte Concert's media library until November 2022.

In addition to classical music, she is also dedicated to the Gamelan music of her native Indonesia.

== Awards ==
- September 2020: 1st prize at La Maestra competition.
