= Austin Shakespeare =

Austin Shakspeare
- Formation: 1984
- Type: Theatre group
- Location: Austin, Texas
- Artistic director: Ann Ciccolella (since 2007)
- Website: www.austinshakespeare.org

Austin Shakespeare is a professional, classical theater production and education company located in Austin, Texas, USA. Multiple annual productions are cast by audition from a mix of Actor's Equity or Non-Equity, visiting or local, and company alumni or new actors. Performers of all ethnic and racial backgrounds are encouraged to audition. Austin Shakespeare is a Resident Company of the Long Center for the Performing Arts.

The annual Shakespeare Under the Stars free production in Zilker Park, as of 2016, has been performed for 32 years. In 2013, the company mounted a production off-Broadway in New York City. Although the foundation of the company's repertoire comes from the plays of William Shakespeare, other classical, high language plays from the likes of Tom Stoppard, Euripides, Tennessee Williams, Oscar Wilde, and Noël Coward have been performed. In 2015, a Stephen Sondheim musical in concert kicked off the new season.

Austin Shakespeare is passionate about providing theater education for all ages. The Shakespeare 20/20 program exposes students to viewing and performing the Bard's works in the classroom under the guidance of professional actors. Shakespeare Idol is an annual monologue and scene performance by area secondary students before a live audience. It includes a workshop and evaluations by a panel of professional judges. Young Shakespeare, a teen company, annually presents Shakespeare plays at a recreation of The Globe Theater with the assistance of professional direction and creative team. Shakespeare Aloud, a weekly reading group involves interested adults in hearing and reading the verse of Shakespeare.

Austin Shakespeare, founded in 1984, is a 501(c)3 nonprofit organization with a legal name of Austin Shakespeare Festival Company, Inc. Its programs are primarily funded by ticket sales, donations, and grants or other support from the likes of the City of Austin Economic Growth & Redevelopment Services Office/Cultural Arts Division, City of Austin Parks and Recreation Department, and Texas Commission on the Arts. Productions and operations of the company are supported by a large group of volunteers.

== Selected productions ==
- Macbeth by William Shakespeare (2016)
- Medea by Euripides (2016)
- A Streetcar Named Desire by Tennessee Williams (2015)
- Sunday in the Park with George by Stephen Sondheim (2015 - staged concert)
- The Taming of the Shrew by William Shakespeare (2015)
- The Invention of Love by Tom Stoppard (2015)
- Cyrano de Bergerac by Edmond Rostand (2014)
- As You Like It by William Shakespeare (2014)
- Othello by William Shakespeare (2014)
- The Belle of Amherst by William Luce (2013)
- Anthem by Jeff Britting based on the novel by Ayn Rand (2013 - performed at the Baryshnikov Arts Center, New York, New York)
- Design for Living by Noël Coward (2013)
- Arcadia by Tom Stoppard (2013)
- Mary Stuart by Friedrich Schiller, adapted by Peter Oswald (2010)
- An Ideal Husband by Oscar Wilde (2009)
- Romeo and Juliet by William Shakespeare (2009)
- Macbeth by William Shakespeare (2008 - first production at The Long Center for the Performing Arts)
- Much Ado About Nothing by William Shakespeare (2008)

== Selected awards ==
- 2011-2012 Austin Critics' Table Award for Dramatic Production (Arcadia)
- 2004-2005 B. Iden Payne Award for Outstanding Production of a Comedy (The Dog in the Manger)

== Selected venues ==
- Rollins Studio Theatre at The Long Center for the Performing Arts, Austin, Texas
- Beverly S. Sheffield Zilker Hillside Theater in Zilker Park, Austin, Texas
- Richard Garriott de Cayeux's Curtain Theater on Lake Austin, Austin, Texas
