= Eckart Preu =

German conductor

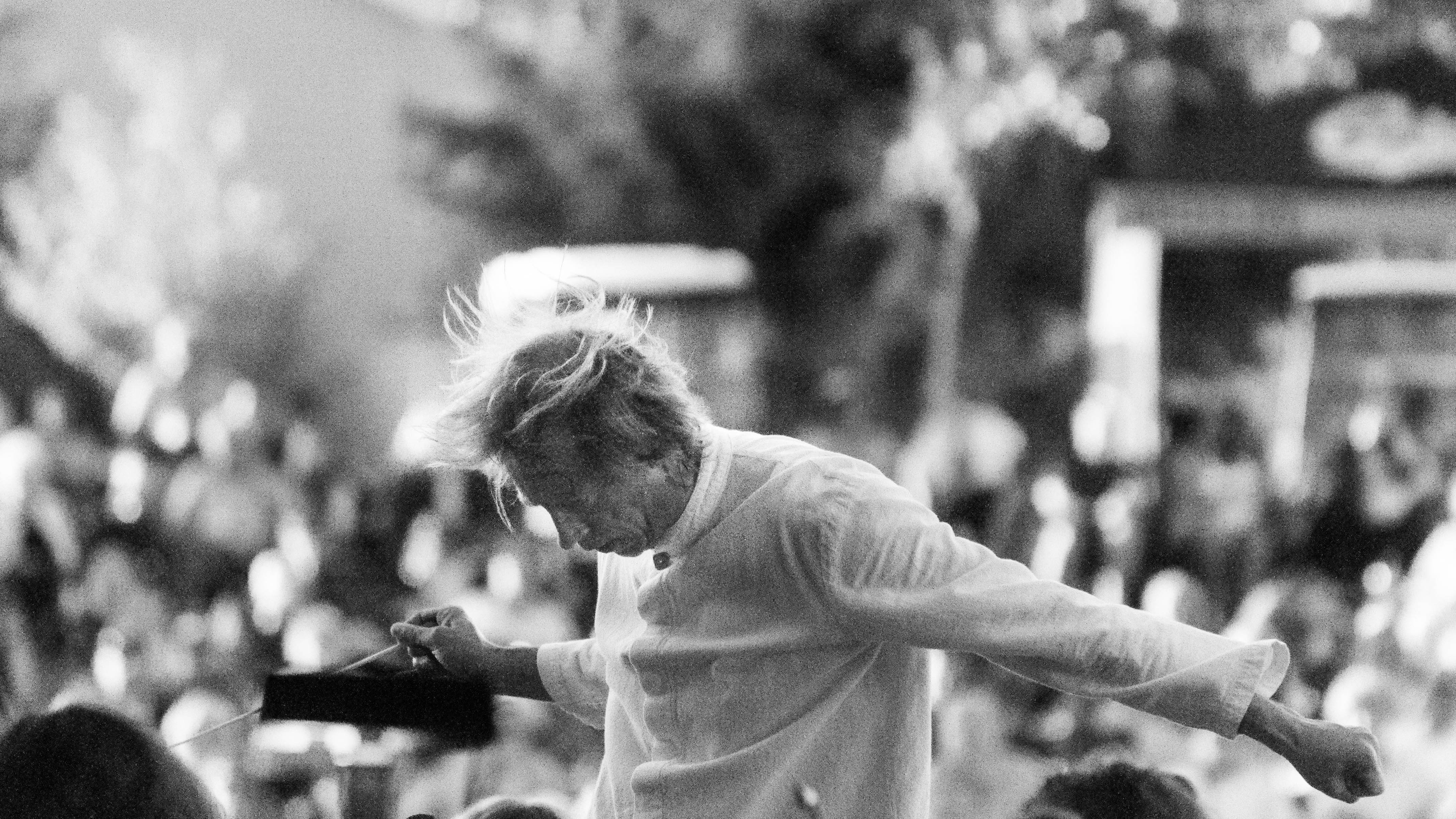
- Preu in 2018
- Born: 24 August 1969 (age 57); Erfurt, East Germany
- Education: MA
- Alma mater: Hochschule für Musik
- Occupation: Conductor
- Employers: Portland Symphony Orchestra; Long Beach Symphony Orchestra; Cincinnati Chamber Orchestra
- Website: www.orchestraconductor.org/orchestraconductor.org

Eckart Preu (born 24 August 1969) is an East German-born conductor and music director of the Portland Symphony Orchestra (PSO) in Maine, the Long Beach Symphony Orchestra in California and the Cincinnati Chamber Orchestra in Ohio. He previously held the same position with the Spokane Symphony, the Stamford Symphony in Connecticut and the Orchestre International de Paris in France. He has also been associate conductor of the Richmond Symphony in Virginia and resident conductor of the American Symphony Orchestra and the American Russian Young Artists Orchestra in New York.

== Early life ==
Preu was born in Erfurt, East Germany, in 1969. His father was a speech therapist.

Preu began voice lessons at the age of 4 and, the following year, began to learn the piano. At the age of 10, he became a member, soloist and assistant conductor of the Boys Choir Dresdner Kreuzchor. In Germany, he earned a master's degree in conducting from the Hochschule für Musik in Weimar, studying under Gunther Kahlert and Nicolás Pasquet. He also studied under Jean-Sebastien Bereau at the Conservatoire National Supérieur de Musique de Paris in France.

== Emigration to the United States ==
Preu came to the United States as winner of the National Conducting Competition of the German Academic Exchange Service (1996) for graduate studies with Harold Farberman at the Hartt School of Music.

In 2019, Preu became the music director of the Portland Symphony Orchestra (PSO) in Portland, Maine, succeeding Robert Moody after a decade in the role. He joined the PSO from Spokane Symphony in Spokane, Washington, having worked there for fifteen years. He has also been music director of the Stamford Symphony in Stamford, Connecticut, beginning in 2005. In October 2016, he was named music director for the Cincinnati Chamber Orchestra, and in 2017 became Music Director of the prestigious Long Beach Symphony in Long Beach, CA. For three seasons, he was associate conductor of the Richmond Symphony Orchestra in Virginia. He also served as resident conductor with the American Symphony Orchestra and the American Russian Young Artists Orchestra. Former posts include music director of the Norwalk Youth Symphony and principal conductor of the New Amsterdam Symphony Orchestra in New York. He was both assistant and guest conductor at the Bard Music Festival. In Europe, Preu served as music director of L'Orchestre Internationale de Paris from 1993 to 1995.

As a guest conductor, Preu has appeared with the Jerusalem Symphony, Hungary's Pecs Philharmonic and in Germany with the Jenaer Philharmonie, the Hallesche Philharmonie, the Thüringer Kammerorchester and the Landessinfonieorchester Gotha.

He performed at Carnegie Hall in May 1999 and January 2008, and at the Sorbonne in Paris. His concerts have been aired by WPKT Stamford, KPBX Spokane, WCVE Richmond and Jerusalem Radio. He has collaborated with internationally renowned soloists like Richard Stoltzman, Horacio Gutierrez, Vladimir Feltsman, Jean-Philippe Collard, Leila Josefowicz and Sarah Chang.

Preu is also a frequent guest speaker for local businesses, community organisations and schools. He writes monthly articles for the local newspaper, the Stamford Advocate.

== Personal life ==
Preu is married to Neeley, with whom (as of 2019) he has two daughters.
