= Richmond Symphony =

US-based performing arts organization

- Orchestra
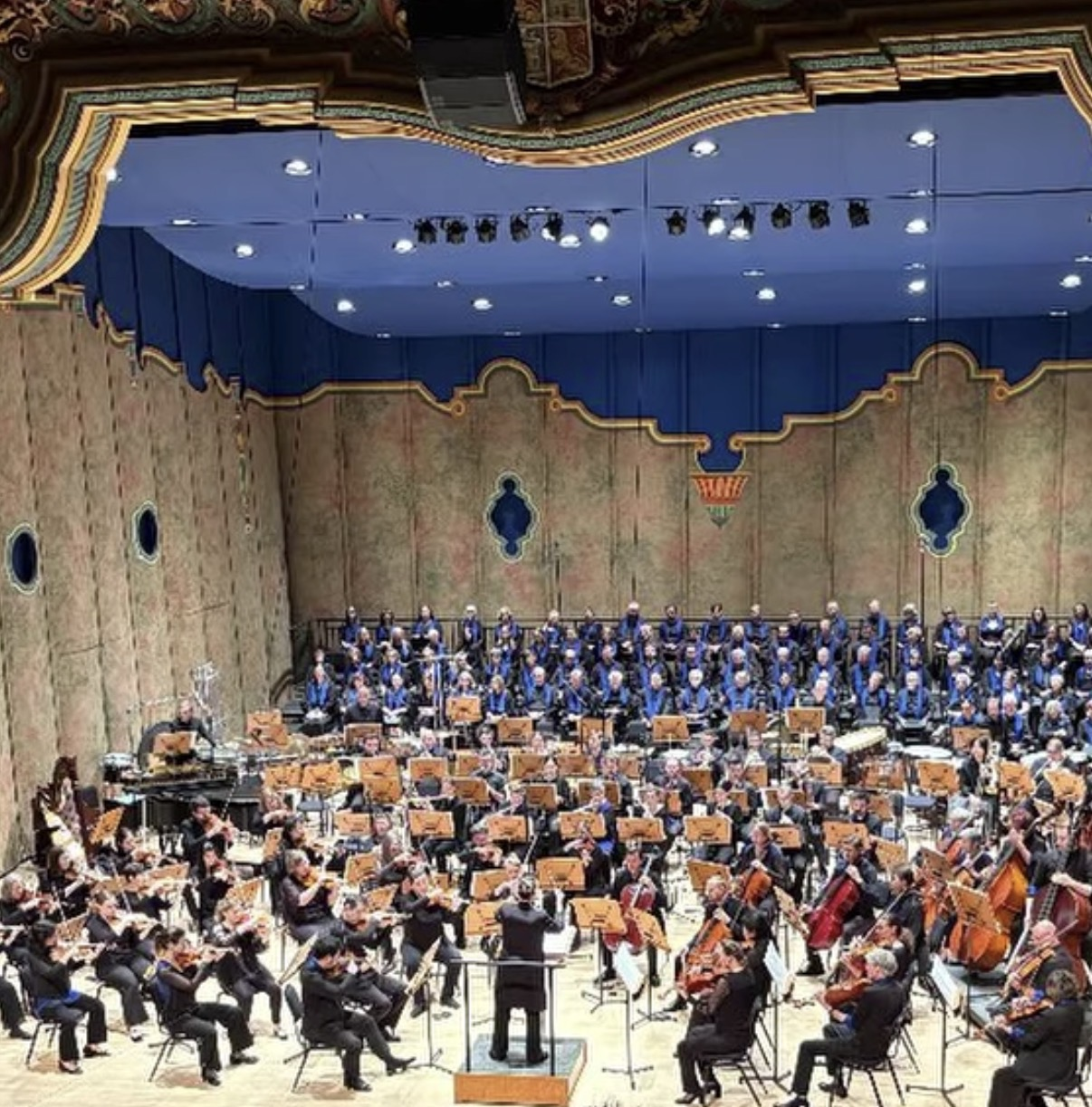
- Founded: 1957
- Location: Richmond, Virginia, United States
- Music director: Valentina Peleggi
- Website: richmondsymphony.com

The Richmond Symphony is an American symphony orchestra based in Richmond, Virginia. Founded in 1957, it is the largest performing arts organization in Central Virginia. The organization includes a full-time orchestra, the Richmond Symphony Chorus, and the Richmond Symphony Youth Orchestra programs.

The symphony performs concert series, special concerts, and tours throughout central, western, and southern Virginia. It is a non-profit corporation partially supported by the Virginia Commission for the Arts and the National Endowment for the Arts.

== History ==
The Richmond Symphony was founded in 1957. The symphony performed three concerts in its inaugural season.

Valentina Peleggi became the Richmond Symphony's music director in 2020. Hae Lee was appointed associate conductor of the Richmond Symphony and conductor of the Richmond Symphony Youth Orchestra in 2024. Its executive director is Lacey Huszcza.

== Music directors and conductors ==
The Richmond Symphony's previous music directors include Edgar Schenkman, Jacques Houtmann, George Manahan, Mark Russell Smith, and Steven Smith.

Music director	Tenure
Edgar Schenkman	1957–1971
Jacques Houtmann	1971–1986
George Manahan	1987–1998
Mark Russell Smith	1999–2009
Steven Smith	2010–2019
Valentina Peleggi	2020–present

Previous associate conductors include William Henry Curry, Peter Bay, Marin Alsop, Thomas Wilkins, Eckart Preu, Clark Etienne Suttle, Sarah Hatsuko Hicks, Erin Freeman, Keitaro Harada, and Chia-Hsuan Lin.

== Ensembles and programs ==
The Richmond Symphony organization includes a full-time orchestra with more than 70 musicians, the Richmond Symphony Chorus with 150 volunteer members, and the Richmond Symphony Youth Orchestra programs with more than 260 student participants. Each season, approximately 200,000 community members listen to live concerts and radio broadcasts by the Richmond Symphony, and 55,000 students and teachers participate in the symphony's educational outreach programs.

=== Richmond Symphony Chorus ===
The Richmond Symphony Chorus was founded in 1971 and gave its first performance under the direction of Robert Shaw. Its directors have been James Erb from 1971 to 2007, Erin R. Freeman from 2007 to 2022, and Richard W. Robbins from 2024 to the present.

=== Richmond Symphony Youth Orchestra Program ===
The Richmond Symphony Youth Orchestra Program includes four ensembles of elementary to secondary school students. Hae Lee was appointed conductor of the Richmond Symphony Youth Orchestra in 2024.

== Concert series ==
The orchestra performs five concert series: Masterworks, featuring symphonic repertoire and guest artists; Metro Collection Series, featuring chamber music and Richmond Symphony musicians as soloists; Pops, featuring classical and popular repertoire; LolliPops, a family-oriented concert series; and Rush Hour, one-hour casual concerts at Hardywood Park Craft Brewery.

== Notable collaborations ==
The symphony has performed with musicians and guest artists including Claudio Arrau, Joshua Bell, Yefim Bronfman, Aaron Copland, Yo-Yo Ma, Jessye Norman, Itzhak Perlman, Jean-Pierre Rampal, Isaac Stern, William Grant Still, Jean-Yves Thibaudet, André Watts, Tony Bennett, Ray Charles, the Dave Matthews Band, Aretha Franklin, Marvin Hamlisch, and Bruce Hornsby.

== Community engagement ==
In 2015, the Richmond Symphony launched its "Big Tent" initiative, which brings concerts and festivals to communities throughout the Richmond region.

As of December 2019, Big Tent community festivals had reached tens of thousands of audience members, generated more than 150 community partnerships, and helped raise more than US$400,000 for the purchase of 363 instruments and in support of arts programming in Richmond Public Schools.

The Big Tent initiative was among the programs supported by a 2017 American Orchestras' Futures Fund grant from the League of American Orchestras.

== See also ==
- Richmond Symphony Youth Orchestra
- Karen Johnson (violinist)
