= Mikhail Simonyan =

Russian violinist

- Born: 1986 (age 38–39)
- Origin: Novosibirsk, Russia
- Occupation: Violinist
- Instrument: Violin

Mikhail Simonyan (born 1986) is a violinist from Novosibirsk, Russia.

== Biography ==
He began to study the violin at the age of five. In 1999, when he was at the age of 13, Simonyan made his New York debut at Lincoln Center with the American Russian Young Artists Orchestra (ARYO) and his debut in St. Petersburg, Russia at the Mariinsky Theatre in ARYO's joint concert with the Mariinsky Youth Orchestra, performing the Karol Szymanowski Violin Concerto No. 1. He has earned first prize awards at the All-Russia Competition in St. Petersburg, the Siberian Violin Competition, the National Prize Prizvanie in Moscow, and the Salon de Virtuosi in New York. He is a winner of the Yehudi Menuhin Foundation Award, and he received the 2000 Virtuoso of the Year award in St. Petersburg. In 2003, the National Academy of Achievement selected him for an award in the Performing Arts. In 2005, he received the highest level of recognition when Vladimir Putin received him at the Kremlin, in acknowledgment of his status as one of Russia’s most promising young musicians.

Mikhail Simonyan made his London recital debut at Wigmore Hall in October 2008.

Mikhail Simonyan studied at the Curtis Institute of Music in Philadelphia and continues to work with Victor Danchenko. He lives in Philadelphia.
