= Alizé Léhon =

French conductor (born 1998)

Alizé Léhon, born in 1998 in Provence, is a French conductor.

She trained at the Conservatoire national supérieur de musique et de danse de Paris in the class of Alain Altinoglu, she became assistant conductor of the Orchestre national d'Île-de-France in 2025. In 2026, she received the Victoires de la musique classique in the category "Révélation chef d'orchestre" and won the third prize in the La Maestra international competition of conductors.

== Biography ==
=== Training ===
Alizé Léhon was born in 1998 in Provence. She studied violin and piano at the Marseille Conservatory, then joined the orchestral conducting class of Franck Fontcouberte at the Conservatory of Montpellier at the age of fourteen.

She then trained in choir conducting at the Sorbonne, where she obtained a bachelor's degree in musicology, then obtained a degree in musical studies in conducting at the conservatory of Aubervilliers-La Courneuve.

She continued her training at the Conservatoire national supérieur de musique et de danse de Paris (CNSMDP), in the class of Alain Altinoglu. She obtained in 2024 a master's degree in conducting.

=== Career ===
In 2024, Alizé Léhon was selected to participate in the Malko international conducting competition in Copenhagen, where she conducted the National Symphony Orchestra of Denmark. In the same year, she won the second Neeme Järvi Prize from the Gstaad Conducting Academy.

In 2025, she was appointed assistant conductor of the Orchestre national d'Île-de-France for two seasons.

During the 2025-2026 season, she conducted Mozart's Abduction from the Seraglio at the Tours Opera and was invited to conduct several French and European orchestras, including the Orchestre national des Pays de la Loire, the Orchestre National Bordeaux Aquitaine, the Orchestre national de Montpellier Occitanie and the Orchestre Colonne.

From the 2026-2027 season, she joined the Académie de l'Opéra national de Paris as the principal conductor of the ADO Orchestras – Apprentissage de l'Opéra.

=== Recognition in 2026 ===
In February 2026, Alizé Léhon participated in the fourth edition of the international competition of conductors La Maestra, organized at the Philharmonie de Paris. She won the third prize and the Génération Opéra prize. Her performances with the Paris Mozart Orchestra and the Orchestre de Paris are the subject of a program broadcast by Arte Concert.

The following month, she was awarded the Victoire de la musique classique in the category "Révélation chef d'orchestre".

== Distinctions ==
- 2024 : second prize Neeme Järvi of the Gstaad Conducting Academy
- 2026 : third prize in the international La Maestra competition
- 2026 : Prix Génération Opéra in the La Maestra competition
- 2026 : Victoire de la musique classique, category "Révélation chef d'orchestre"
