= Peter Bay =

American conductor

Peter Bay is music director of the Austin Symphony Orchestra.

== Life ==
He graduated from the University of Maryland and the Peabody Institute.

He has previously been Music Director and Conductor of the Britt Festival Orchestra in Oregon, Music Director of the Erie Philharmonic, the Annapolis Symphony Orchestra, and the Breckenridge Music Festival, and has held conducting posts with the Rochester Philharmonic Orchestra, the Richmond Symphony, and the St. Paul Chamber Orchestra. He has been guest conductor for over seventy other orchestras around the United States.

== Awards ==
- 1980 Baltimore Symphony Orchestra Young Conductors Competition
- 1987 Leopold Stokowski Competition sponsored by the American Symphony Orchestra
