= Terrace Theater =

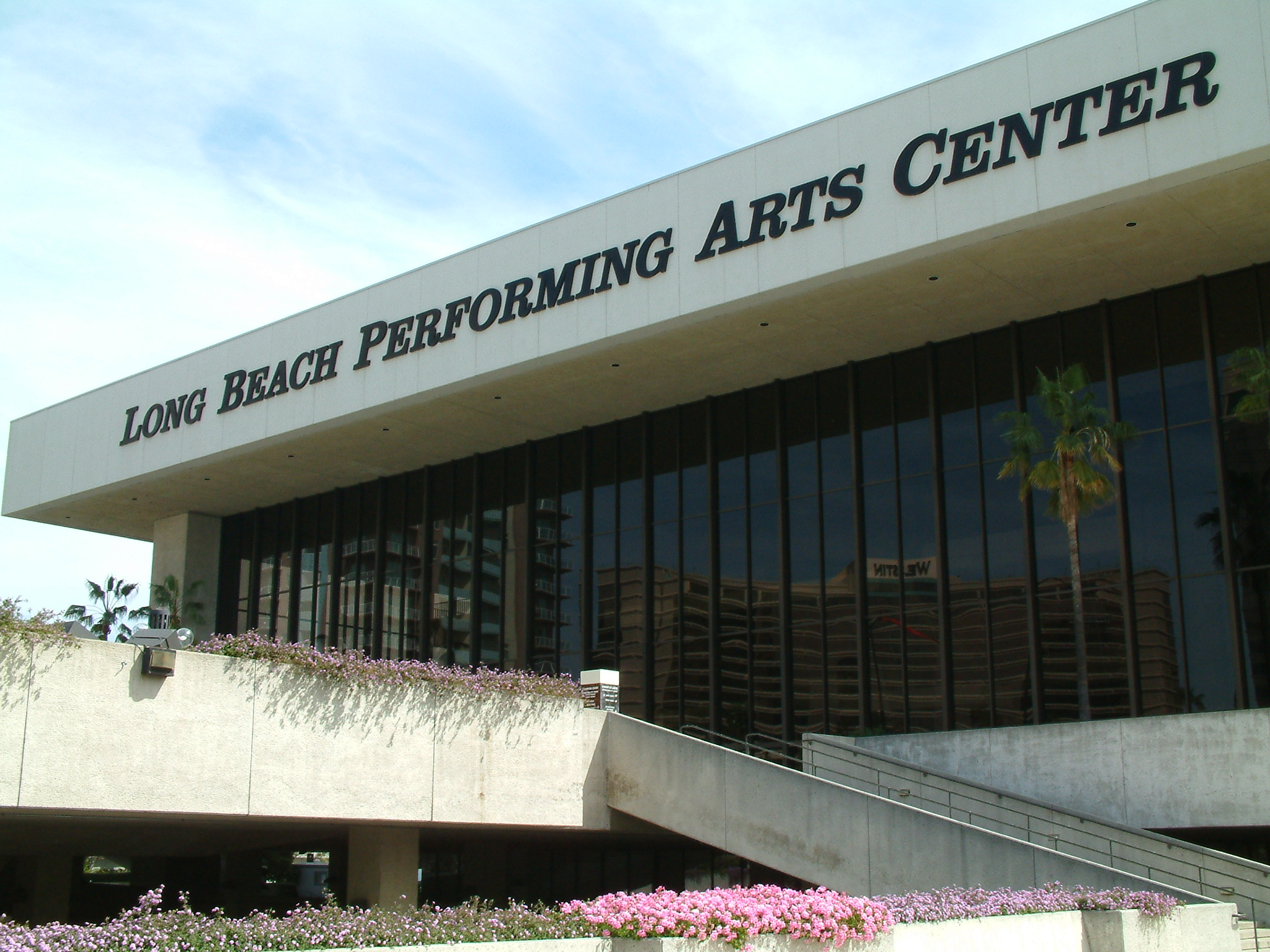
- An outside view of the Terrace Theater.

- Location in Long Beach
- Full name: Long Beach Terrace Theater
- Address: 300 East Ocean Boulevard; Long Beach, California; United States of America
- Location: Long Beach, California
- Coordinates: 33.7666°N 118.1894°W
- Owner: City of Long Beach
- Operator: Legends Hospitality and ASM Global
- Seating type: Reserved seating
- Capacity: 3,051
- Type: Theater
- Events: Concerts, Broadway tours, classical music, dance, and cultural events
- Public transit: Downtown Long Beach station (A Line)

Construction
- Built: 1978
- Architect: Allied Architects

Website
- www.longbeachcc.com

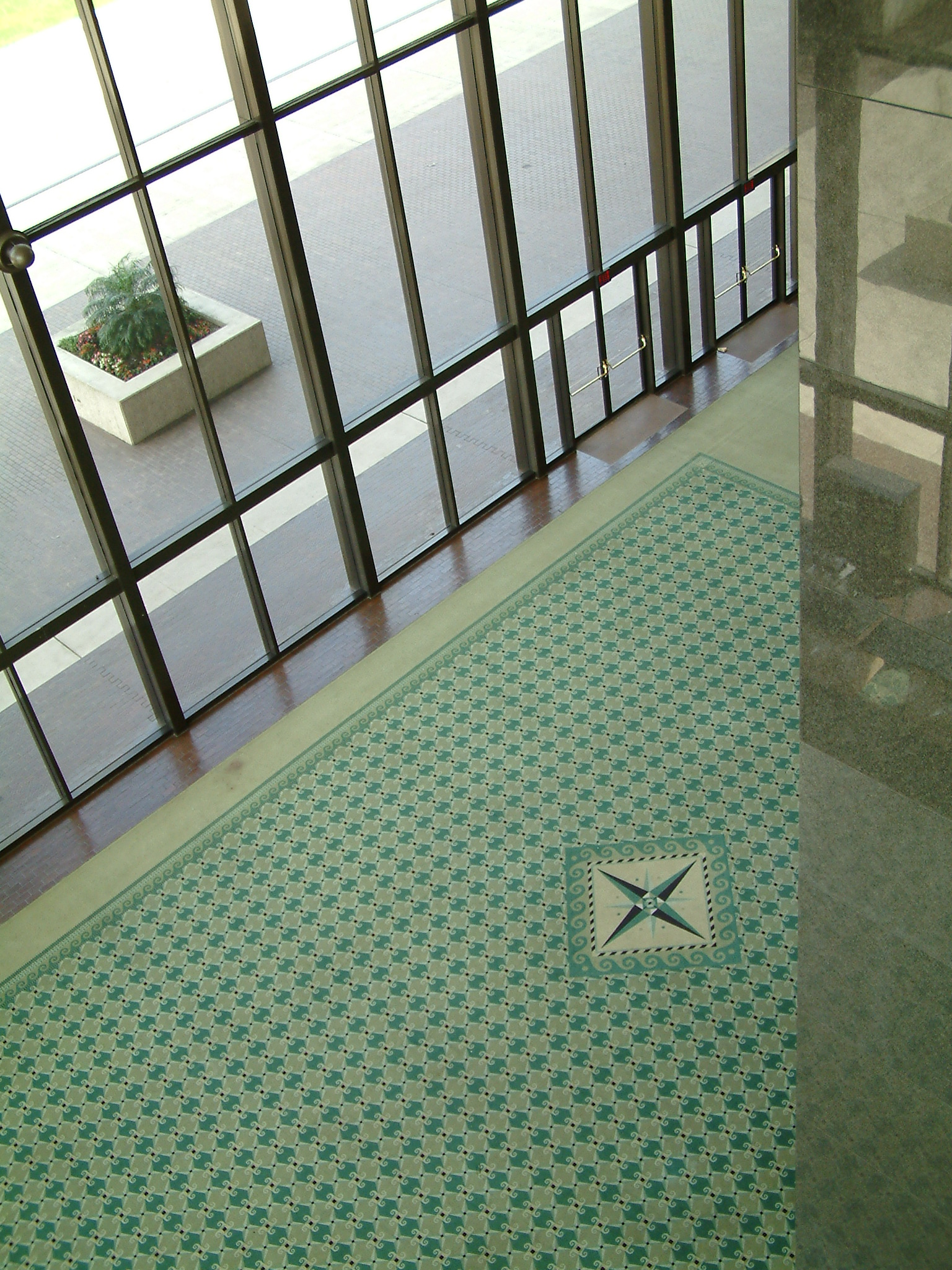
The Terrace Theater lobby from the balcony level.

The Terrace Theater is a full theatrical and performance venue located in Long Beach, California. The theater seats 3,051 patrons at its maximum configuration in Orchestra, Loge, and Balcony sections. The Orchestra seating section is arranged in the Continental seating style with no center aisle and two exits for every four rows in the theater. The Terrace is one of the venues in the Long Beach Convention and Entertainment Center. It is attached to the 825-seat Center Theater.

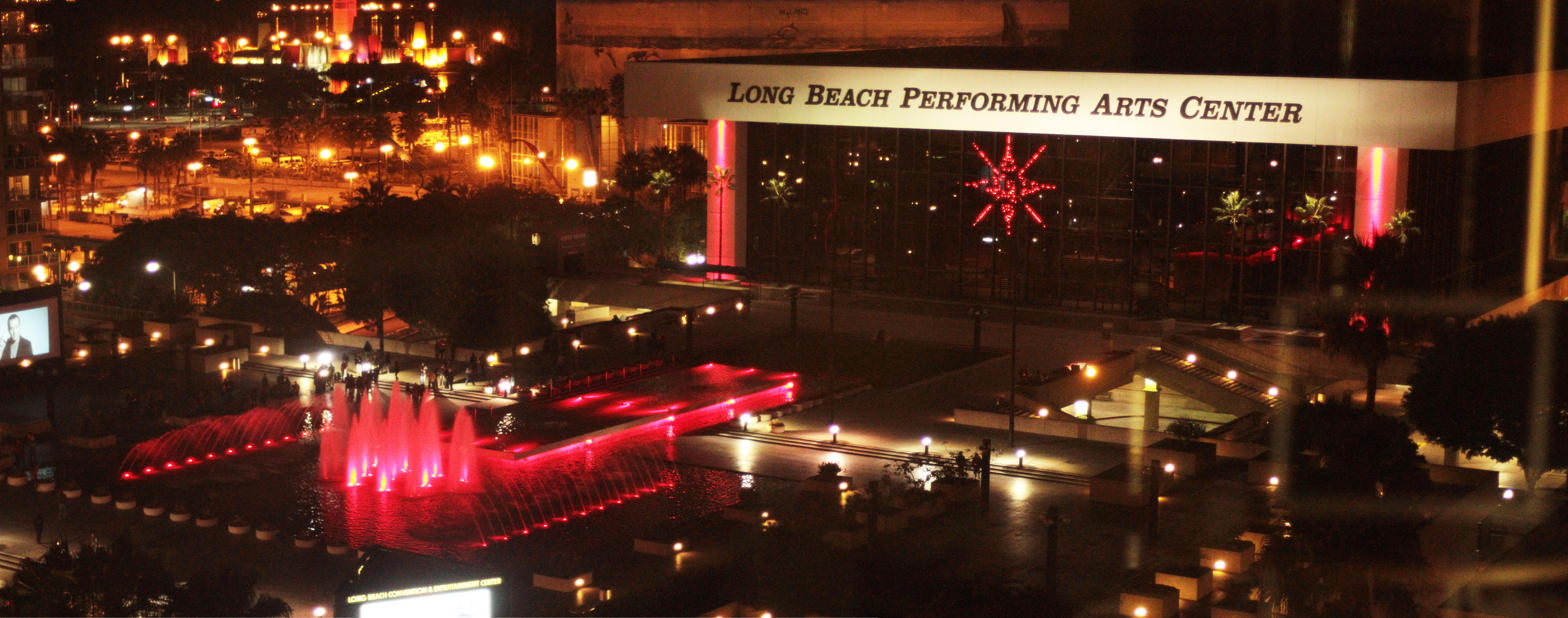
Terrace Theater

The theater was completed in 1978, replacing the Long Beach Municipal Auditorium, which had been demolished in 1975.

The theater accommodates a wide variety of events including local performances, church services, dance competitions, beauty pageants, Broadway touring productions, industrial conventions, symphony performances, and operas. It is the current home to the Long Beach Symphony Orchestra. The theater is maintained and run by the Stagehand Department of the Long Beach Convention and Entertainment Center.

In 1978 Richard Pryor's performance was filmed and recorded. Richard Pryor: Live in Concert was released to theaters in 1979.

== History ==
The Long Beach Terrace Theater opened in 1978 as part of the larger Long Beach Convention and Entertainment Center project, a downtown revitalization effort following the demolition of the original Long Beach Municipal Auditorium. The old auditorium, which dated back to 1932, was torn down in 1975 to make way for a modern convention and performing arts complex on the same site.

The Terrace Theater was designed to host a range of performing arts and public events, opening with over 3,000 seats in a proscenium layout. Originally referred to as the Pacific Terrace Theatre, it quickly became home to the Long Beach Symphony Orchestra, which had previously performed at the municipal auditorium.

In 1984, the venue was used for fencing events during the 1984 Summer Olympics in Los Angeles. Over the decades, the Terrace Theater has hosted a wide array of events, including concerts, civic ceremonies, lectures, and national touring productions. It has also been the site of televised events and notable recordings, including performances by Richard Pryor.

The theater was constructed as part of a $51.5 million public project aimed at transforming Long Beach’s waterfront into a cultural and commercial hub. It remains one of the largest fixed-seat performance venues in the region and a central piece of Long Beach’s civic identity.

== Architecture and Design ==
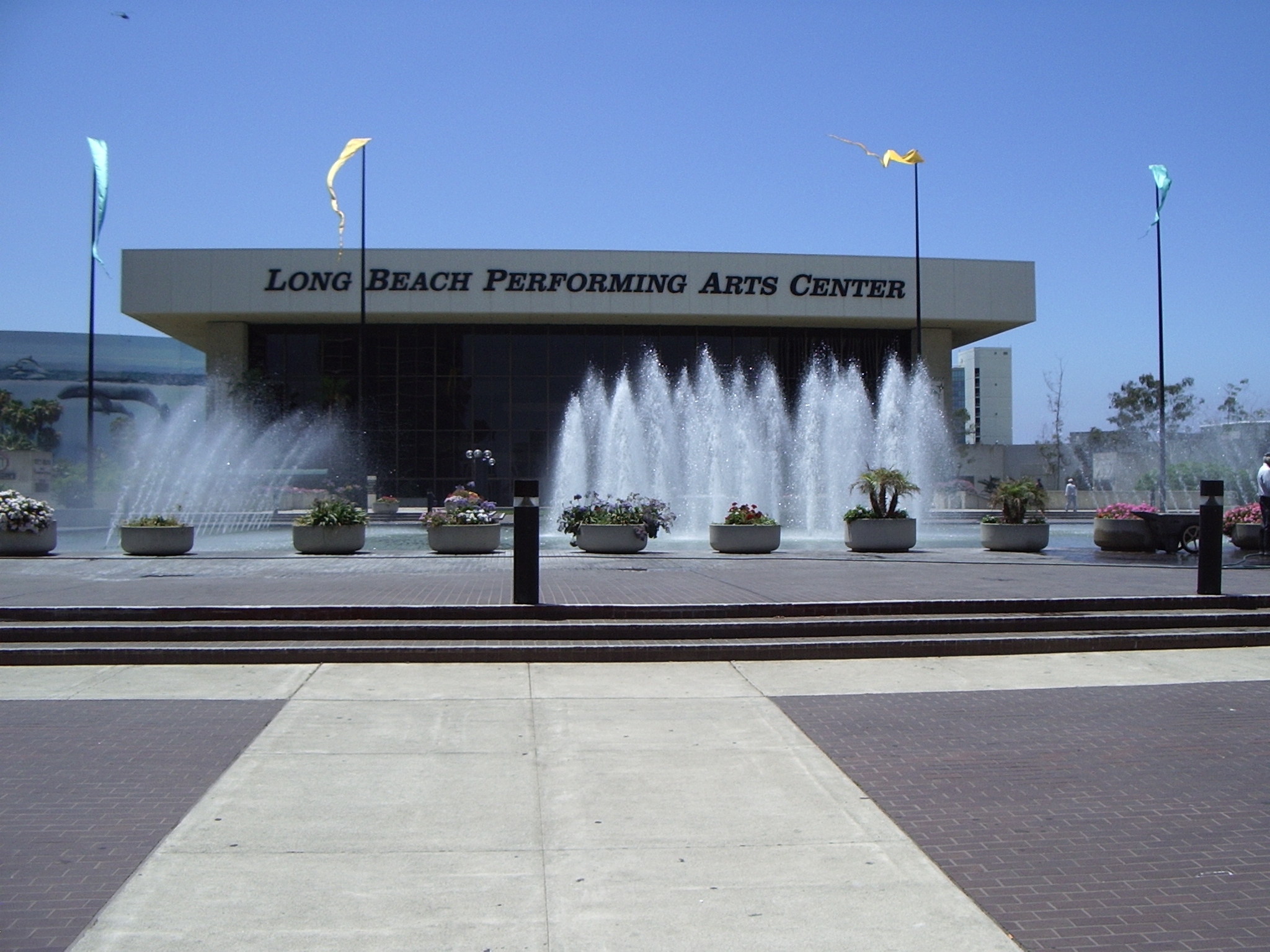
exterior, with plaza and fountains

The Terrace Theater was designed in the late-modernist architectural style by a consortium of local firms known as Allied Architects, which included contributions from prominent Long Beach designers such as Edward Killingsworth, Hugh and Don Gibbs (Gibbs & Gibbs), Stanley Val Goldin, and Kenneth Wing Sr.

The building features a three-level glass-paneled lobby stretching over 200 feet, designed to create a transparent, inviting public space. Inside, sweeping staircases lead to Loge and Balcony levels, and during evening events, the glow from the glass façade and adjacent fountain creates a dramatic visual effect.

The main auditorium seats 3,051 guests in a continental seating arrangement—eliminating a central aisle to provide optimal sightlines and acoustics. The venue includes Orchestra, Loge, and Balcony seating, with a fully equipped proscenium stage, orchestra pit, and professional-grade lighting and sound systems. Acoustically, the theater was engineered for both amplified and unamplified performances, allowing flexibility for symphony concerts, theatrical productions, and lectures.

Renovations over time have preserved the core architectural design while updating technical capabilities. The building’s original finishes, including concrete accents and acoustic panels, remain visible in much of the lobby and auditorium. Its design has been praised as emblematic of Long Beach’s civic ambition in the 1970s, in concert with the adjacent Long Beach Arena and City Hall complex.

== Operations ==
The Terrace Theater is owned by the City of Long Beach and operated under contract by ASM Global, a private venue management company. Since the late 1990s, the Long Beach Convention & Entertainment Center—of which the Terrace Theater is a part—has been operated by ASM Global (formerly SMG), which handles booking, maintenance, and event production across the complex.

In 2022, the City of Long Beach renewed ASM Global’s management contract with new incentives aimed at boosting live entertainment, particularly in the Terrace Theater and neighboring Long Beach Arena. The agreement included performance benchmarks for increasing the number of commercial bookings such as concerts, comedy, and touring shows, with a goal of achieving 30–50% commercial utilization.

The theater also works closely with the Long Beach Convention and Visitors Bureau (CVB), which markets the venue as part of larger convention packages. During major events, the Terrace Theater may host keynote sessions or evening performances linked to conventions held in the adjacent exhibit halls.

Day-to-day technical operations, including stage management, lighting, and guest services, are managed by in-house staff assigned to the Convention Center. The theater employs union stagehands and has a dedicated production crew for larger events.

Revenue is generated through ticket sales, rental fees, concessions, and parking. While large-scale events contribute significantly to operational income, the theater remains a publicly owned facility and occasionally receives funding from the city's Tidelands Fund for capital improvements.

== Renovations and Upgrades ==
Since its opening in 1978, the Terrace Theater has undergone several upgrades and renovations to improve both patron experience and technical functionality, while preserving its original architecture.

In the early 1990s, minor renovations were undertaken during the expansion of the adjacent exhibit halls. These included improved lobby access points and updates to lighting and sound systems. Around this time, the orchestra and balcony seating were reupholstered, and acoustic enhancements were made to better accommodate amplified events.

A major public-facing enhancement occurred in 2017–2018, when the outdoor Terrace Theater Plaza and fountain were fully renovated. The city invested approximately $1.5 million to install programmable LED lighting, upgraded water jets, and an integrated sound system to create a choreographed fountain show. The surrounding plaza was upgraded with audio towers and lighting trusses, allowing it to function as an open-air venue for up to 5,000 attendees.

In 2017, the city also opened the “Rainbow Bridge,” a 600-foot illuminated pedestrian walkway linking the Convention Center’s Pine Avenue entrance to the Terrace Theater area. The bridge features over 3,500 LED lights programmed for dynamic nighttime shows, improving pedestrian access and visually enhancing the campus.

Smaller interior upgrades have continued incrementally. These include new seats with improved legroom, backstage equipment modernization, ADA accessibility improvements, and energy-efficient lighting retrofits. HVAC systems and technical infrastructure were also updated during the COVID-19 closure in 2020–2021.

As of 2025, the City of Long Beach continues to allocate funds for venue maintenance and modernization, including digital enhancements like public Wi-Fi, streaming infrastructure, and improved connectivity across the convention complex.

== Programming and Usage ==
The Terrace Theater is a multi-purpose venue used for a broad range of programming, including concerts, Broadway-style touring productions, symphonic music, lectures, civic ceremonies, and community events.

It serves as the longtime home of the Long Beach Symphony Orchestra, which performs its classical and pops series in the venue. The theater has also hosted occasional productions by the Long Beach Ballet and Long Beach Opera.

From the 1970s through the 1990s, the venue was used by the Long Beach Civic Light Opera (LBCLO), a regional producer of musicals. National tours and high-profile revivals followed, including extended runs of Les Misérables and The Phantom of the Opera in the 1990s and 2000s.

Today, the Terrace Theater regularly books touring artists, comedians, and live entertainment acts. Performers have included Bob Dylan, Trevor Noah, John Mulaney, Kevin Hart, and The Temptations. The venue is especially popular among stand-up comedians due to its size and acoustics.

Civic use remains a key part of the calendar. The theater hosts graduation ceremonies for local high schools and colleges, naturalization ceremonies, mayoral addresses, and community celebrations. It is also a frequent site for dance competitions, conferences, faith-based events, and school assemblies.

The plaza in front of the theater functions as an additional performance space and has been used for outdoor concerts, holiday events, and the opening night festivities of the Acura Grand Prix of Long Beach.

== Cultural and Civic Role ==
Since its opening, the Terrace Theater has been central to Long Beach’s cultural identity. Designed as part of the city’s downtown redevelopment initiative, the venue helped transition Long Beach from a Navy-dominated port city to a destination for the arts, tourism, and conventions.

The theater is a cultural anchor of the Long Beach Performing Arts Center, which also includes the Beverly O’Neill Theater and Long Beach Arena. These venues enable the city to host local arts productions as well as major touring acts. Former Mayor Beverly O'Neill, a champion of the arts, emphasized the importance of culture in Long Beach’s revitalization efforts and economic development.

Economically, the Terrace Theater supports downtown businesses by drawing patrons to nearby restaurants, bars, and hotels. Events at the venue often coincide with peak tourism periods, and it plays a key role in convention-related programming. According to the Long Beach CVB, visitor spending linked to events at the Convention & Entertainment Center contributes significantly to the city's tourism revenue.

The venue also functions as a civic space. It regularly hosts public addresses, including the annual State of the City speech, as well as citywide commemorations and public forums. It has been used as a gathering space during times of crisis and celebration, reinforcing its role as a community landmark.

The theater’s location—across from the Rainbow Bridge and adjacent to the waterfront— helps it be considered as one of the most photographed and visited landmarks in downtown Long Beach. City leaders have described it as both a functional venue and a symbol of Long Beach’s cultural aspirations.

== Future Plans ==
As of 2025, the City of Long Beach continues to invest in the Terrace Theater and the larger Convention & Entertainment Center complex to remain competitive in the Southern California entertainment and convention market.

Planned improvements include upgrades to digital infrastructure, such as high-speed public Wi-Fi, improved accessibility, and enhanced technical systems to support hybrid events. The theater is also expected to integrate more closely with upcoming citywide entertainment offerings.

A major development is the construction of a new outdoor amphitheater near the Queen Mary known as the “Long Beach Music Bowl,” set to open in late 2025. This 12,000-seat venue will be operated by ASM Global, the same management company overseeing the Terrace Theater. City officials view the amphitheater as complementary to the Terrace Theater, enabling year-round programming across both indoor and outdoor spaces.

Additionally, the city has signaled interest in pursuing a regular Broadway touring series at the Terrace Theater, similar to those in Los Angeles and Costa Mesa, to solidify its reputation as a regional performing arts destination.

City leaders have also discussed leveraging the venue as part of preparations for the 2028 Summer Olympics, for which Long Beach will host several events. These investments are aimed at enhancing the city’s entertainment infrastructure and ensuring the Terrace Theater remains a vital civic and cultural venue for years to come.
