= Long Center for the Performing Arts =

Venue in Austin, Texas, U.S.

Joe R. and Teresa Lozano Long Center for the Performing Arts
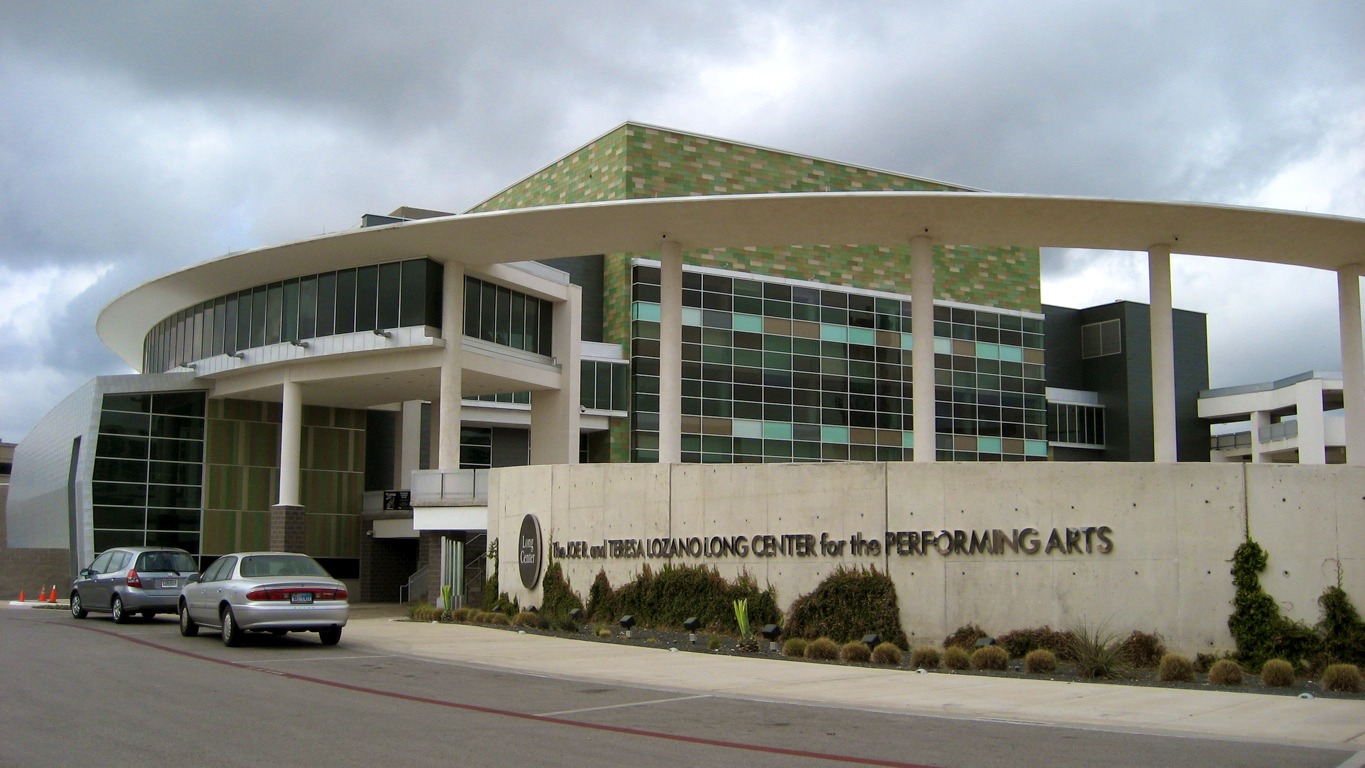
- Long Center side entrance
- Interactive map of Joe R. and Teresa Lozano Long Center for the Performing Arts
- Address: 701 W. Riverside Drive; Austin, Texas, U.S.
- Coordinates: 30.2602°N 97.7512°W
- Owner: City of Austin
- Operator: Greater Austin Performing Arts Center
- Capacity: Michael & Susan Dell Hall: 2,442; Debra and Kevin Rollins Studio Theatre; 229; City Terrace: 2,000
- Type: Performing arts center

Construction
- Opened: 28 March 2008
- Architects: Nelsen Partners and Ziedler Partnership Architects

Website
- thelongcenter.org

The Joe R. and Teresa Lozano Long Center for the Performing Arts is a performing arts venue located along Lady Bird Lake in downtown Austin, Texas, United States. The Long Center is the permanent home of the Austin Symphony Orchestra, Austin Opera and Ballet Austin and hosts other Austin-area performing arts organizations.

== History ==
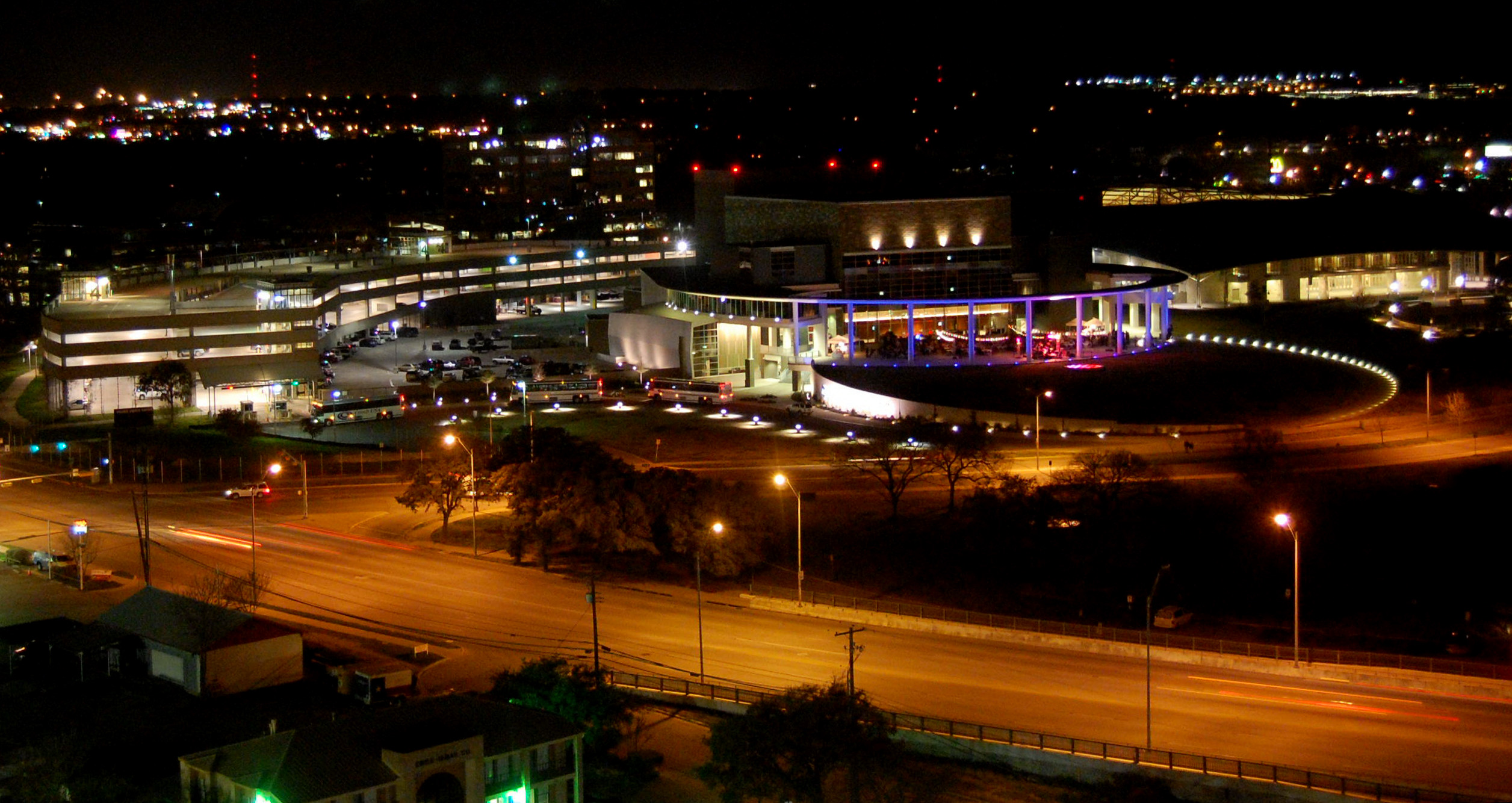
Viewed from the northeast

The Lester Palmer Municipal Auditorium was built for a total of $2.5 million, and opened on January 5th, 1959, and was considered the finest design of contemporary architecture.

It was United States President John F. Kennedy's destination on November 22, 1963, when he was assassinated in Dallas. He was scheduled to give a speech for 5,000 people a dinner in the Grand Courtyard.

In the late 1990s Austin's primary symphony orchestra, opera group and ballet company were brought together by the need for a high-quality permanent performance venue. The three groups formed an organization called Arts Center Stage and began raising funds and developing plans for a new performing arts center they could share. Eventually they petitioned the City of Austin for the right to lease and renovate the Lester E. Palmer Auditorium on the south shore of Lady Bird Lake and a city referendum authorized the lease in 1998. In April 1999 the project was named after Joe R. and Teresa Lozano Long, who had donated $20 million towards the new facility.

An original plan developed by Chicago architects Skidmore, Owings & Merrill was commissioned November 1999, and by August 2001 Arts Center Stage had raised over $61 million of its $110 million funding goal. The facility was designed to have four theatres, ranging in size from a 232-seat studio theatre to a grand theatre seating over 2,000. With the slowing economy in 2002–3, the Long Center Board of Trustees, major donors, community arts leaders, and staff began researching methods to decrease project costs. A new project was proposed and unanimously approved in October 2003, involving construction of the Long Center in phases. Phase I of the building project included the Michael & Susan Dell Hall (2,242 seats) and the Debra & Kevin Rollins Studio Theatre (229 seats). Phase II would include the Topfer Theatre and Recital & Education Building.

After 10 years of construction, the grand opening of the Long Center took place on March 28, 2008. Funding for the $77 million first-phase was provided exclusively by private donations from more than 4,600 supporters.

=== Recycling the Palmer Auditorium ===
In order to reduce costs and decrease the environmental impact of the renovation, 95% of material from the pre-existing Palmer Auditorium was recycled and incorporated into Phase I of the Long Center. One of the architectural stand-outs of the Long Center is its circular “ring-beam” around the city terrace, which was originally an anchoring structure for the Palmer Auditorium. The aluminum panels used to construct the Palmer Auditorium roof were reused for the exterior finish and wall decorations of the Dell Hall. In addition, five tons of steel from the Palmer Auditorium were melted and reused in the construction of the Long Center.

== Resident companies ==
The Long Center has three Founding Resident Companies:

- Austin Opera
- Austin Symphony Orchestra
- Ballet Austin

Several other Austin performance groups have also been designated as Resident Companies:

- Austin Shakespeare
- Pollyanna Theatre Company
- Tapestry Dance
- Conspirare

== Stages and venues ==
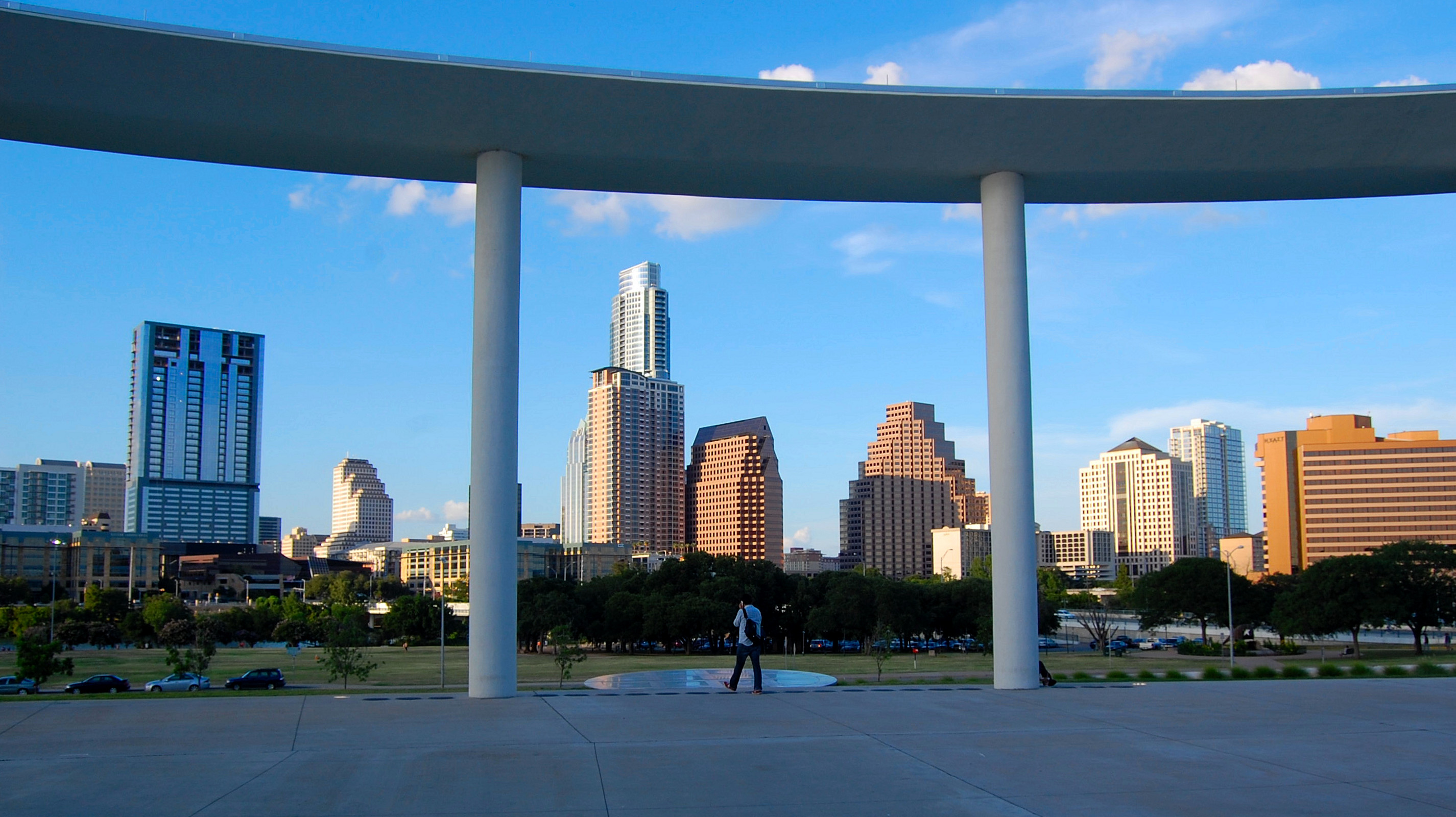
Austin skyline viewed from the Long Center's City Terrace

- Michael and Susan Dell Hall – A 2,442 seat grand concert hall with parterre, mezzanine, and balcony levels that wrap around the interior walls to form boxes at each level.
- Debra and Kevin Rollins Studio Theatre – An adaptable black-box theatre that seats 80-229, offering configurations from theatre in the round, to thrust stage, to cabaret seating.
- City Terrace and Hartman Concert Park – A terrace located outside the Dell Hall looking onto Lady Bird Lake and Auditorium Shores. The City Terrace provides a panoramic view of downtown Austin while encircled by the “ring beam” from the old Palmer Auditorium. At the middle of the “ring beam” is a “compression ring” from the old Palmer Auditorium, which has been transformed into a bottom-lit, circular stage.
- Kodosky Donor Lounge – An enclosed lounge on the east and north side of the mezzanine level of the Long Center with floor-to-ceiling windows.
- West Pincer Terrace & Lounge – A covered, open-air lounge on the west side of the mezzanine level.
- AT&T Education Rooms – Two education rooms for small receptions, meetings, or classroom space.
- ICON Stage – A 3D-printed, outdoor stage completed in 2023, offering panoramic views of the Austin skyline located on the North lawn.

== Architects, consultants, and design ==
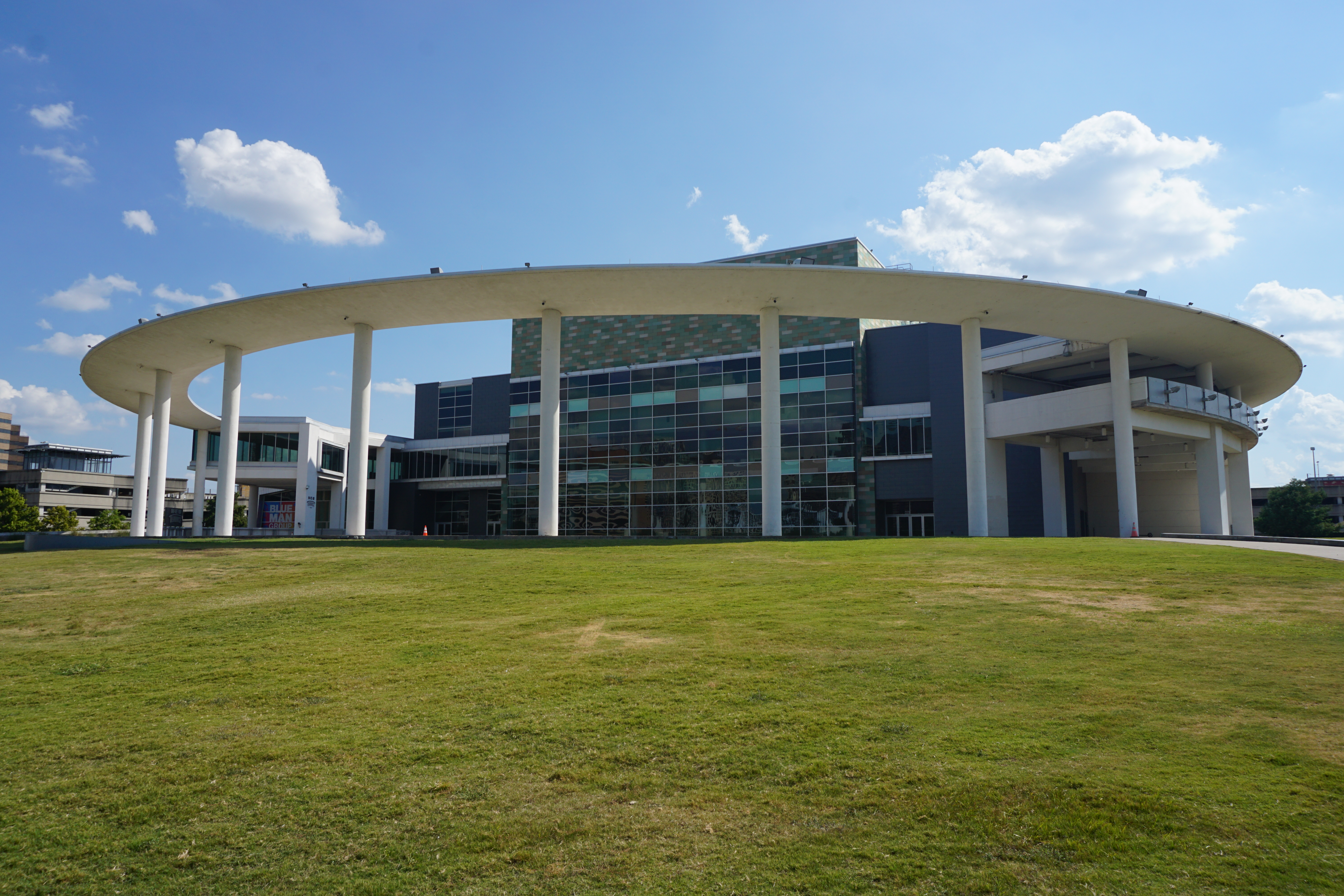
Exterior of the Long Center for the Performing Arts

Architects and designers of the Long Center include:

- Zeidler Partnership Architects
- TeamHaas Architects
- Nelsen Partners
- Fischer Dachs Associates
- Jaffe Holden Acoustics, Inc.
- Architectural Engineers Collaborative (Structural Engineering)
