= Clemens Center =

Concert and theater center in New York, US

- Interactive map of Clemens Center
- Address: 207 Clemens Center Parkway; Elmira, New York; United States
- Coordinates: 42.089573°N 76.805411°W
- Owner: Chemung County Performing Arts, Inc.
- Capacity: Powers Theater: 1,618; Mandeville Hall: 200
- Type: performing arts center

Construction
- Opened: December 21, 1925
- Reopened: 1977

Website
- www.clemenscenter.com

The Clemens Center is a concert and theater center in Elmira, New York. It is named after Samuel Clemens, whose pen name was Mark Twain and was often resident in Elmira when writing his books. The Clemens Center partners with local educators through the Mary Tripp Marks School-Time Series to allow students to experience live theater.

== Usage ==
According to its official website, more than 100,000 Twin Tiers residents attend more than 100 professional and community performances in its facilities each year. It is run by a board of Trustees and more than 200 volunteers contribute nearly 10,000 hours each year working as ushers, concession operators, ticket takers, receptionists and Board/Committee members.

It is home to the Orchestra of the Southern Finger Lakes, where it performs the majority of its concerts.

== History ==
The Powers Theater opened on December 21, 1925 as a 2,500 seat vaudeville and silent film house. Described as "the largest and most magnificent theater between New York and Buffalo," it contained a Marr and Colton theater organ, and featured extensive murals, opera boxes and chandeliers.

In 1946 when the Chemung River overflowed its banks, the theater was flooded causing extensive damage. It was flooded again in 1972 in the aftermath of Hurricane Agnes that so devastated the region. Soon after, the building was targeted for demolition to accommodate a new highway.

The Clemens Center organization was formed in 1975 to obtain and manage funding to save and preserve the theater. The theater reopened with its first performances coming in the Fall of 1977. This was mostly due to a citizens group which raised $750,000 to save the facility. The funds were used to make alterations that reduced the theater's seating capacity by almost 600 seats and upgraded the stage lighting and audio systems.

In 1987, the 2,500-square foot Mandeville Hall was added as an intimate, multi-use "black box" theater suitable for drama, recitals, community functions, lectures and seminars.

In 1995, a Facilities Master Plan was created to guide the organization in maintaining and improving the facilities. 1999 saw completion of the first phase, which included renovating and expanding the lobby space to include amenities such as restrooms, an elevator, concessions and a coat check. The second phase, completed in 2008, saw the restoration and expansion of the Powers Theater.

The Clemens Center also leases space to various community performing arts organizations in the area.
