= Karen Johnson (violinist) =

American musician

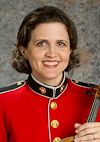
Johnson in 2011

Karen Johnson is an American violinist. She began her studies at the age of 4. She has served as the concertmaster of the Juilliard Orchestra and of the Richmond Symphony Orchestra. She was also a guest concertmaster of the Phoenix Symphony, Seattle Symphony, and the Oregon Symphony in Portland. She has served as concertmaster of The "President's Own" Marine Band Chamber Orchestra.
