= Portland Symphony Orchestra =

- Orchestra
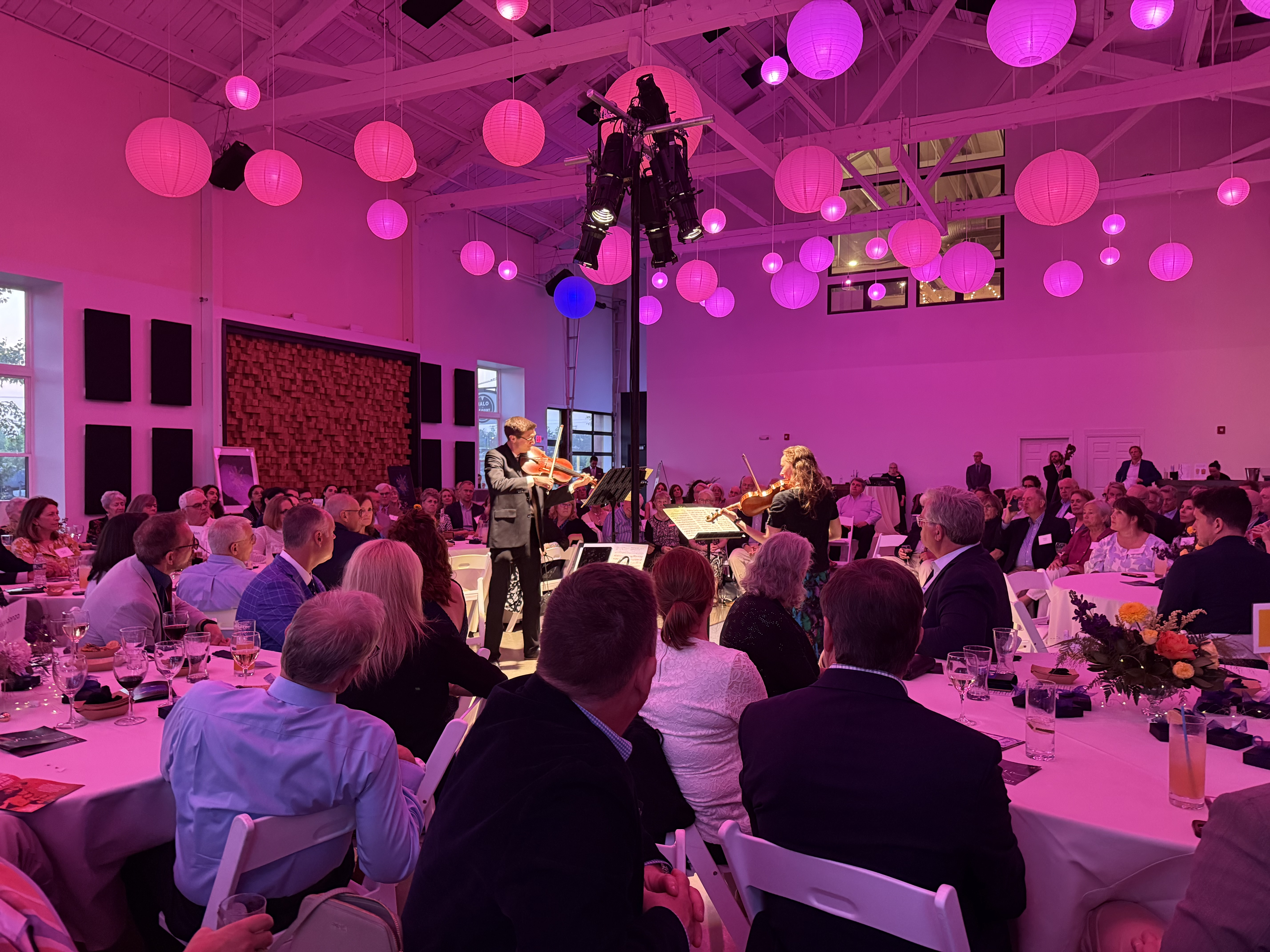
- A duet by PSO members Matthew Consul (viola) and Mia Bella D’Augelli (violin) at an event in 2025
- Short name: PSO
- Former name: Amateur Strand Symphony Orchestra (1924–1927); Portland Municipal Orchestra (1927–1932); Portland Maine Symphony (1932–1969)
- Founded: 1924 (102 years ago)
- Location: Portland, Maine, U.S.
- Concert hall: Merrill Auditorium
- Music director: Eckart Preu
- Website: portlandsymphony.org

The Portland Symphony Orchestra (PSO) was established in 1924 in Portland, Maine, United States, as the Amateur Strand Symphony Orchestra. Started by a small group of musicians who had sent out invitations to join their organization to people in the area, they had their first rehearsal the following year with 75 instrumentalists, giving their first concert a month later at the Strand Theater. In 1927, the orchestra changed its name to the Portland Municipal Orchestra, and again in 1932 to the Portland Maine Symphony. In 1969, the orchestra's name was changed to the Portland Symphony Orchestra, after that name became available when an older orchestra in Portland, Oregon, relinquished it in favor of a new name, the Oregon Symphony. Today, the Portland Symphony Orchestra is recognized to be one of the top orchestras of its size in the country. The concert season runs from September to May and during July, and performs a variety of concerts in their home concert hall, Portland's Merrill Auditorium.

== Magic of Christmas ==
The orchestra began holding the Magic of Christmas concert series in 1980. General manager Russ Burleigh suggested the idea of a holiday concert and conductor Bruce Hangen created the tradition. Magic of Christmas runs for twelve shows in December leading up to Christmas. Each season, the concert is different and includes different guest singers and performers. It always includes the 100-member Magic of Christmas Chorus and the PSO Children's Chorus. The concert always features a carol sing-along and a performance of Leroy Anderson's "Sleigh Ride" for which the musicians and choir members wear hats, scarves and reindeer ears. The concert often features a performance of "The Maine Christmas Song," by Con Fullam, a native of Sidney, Maine.

In 2020, the Magic of Christmas of was live-streamed online because of the COVID-19 pandemic. That year, the concert program was as follows:

- Samuel Coleridge-Taylor: Christmas Overture
- Pavel Josef Vejvanovský: Sonata Natalis C-dur
- Alan Menken: "A Place Called Home" from A Christmas Carol
- Con Fullam: "Somewhere"
- Jonathan Richman: Hanukkah Medley
- Engelbert Humperdinck/Andreas Tarkmann: Hansel and Gretel Prelude
- Traditional/Brian Sadler: "Sheriff Santa"
- John Wineglass: The Toy Factory: Little Elves, Fairies, and Snowmen; a PSO Commission and World Premiere
- Pyotr Ilyich Tchaikovsky: "Waltz of the Snowflakes" from Nutcracker
- Traditional/Jonathan Richman: "O Holy Night!"
- Leroy Anderson: "Sleigh Ride"
- Traditional/Jonathan Richman: Christmas Sing-A-Long
- Traditional: "We Wish You a Merry Christmas"

In 2024, Maine Public Broadcasting began broadcasting a recorded version of the concert on Christmas Eve and Christmas Day. The broadcast was repeated in 2025.

== Conductors ==
The Portland Symphony Orchestra has had thirteen main conductors since its establishment in 1924. Its first conductor was the city of Portland's organist Charles Raymond Cronham, from 1927 to 1932. During his tenure, he extended rehearsals and the concert schedule. He also inaugurated out-of-town concerts such as the performance at Bowdoin College in January 1928. Volunteers and musicians transported the orchestra and all its instruments, including two pianos.

In 1933, a school of music supervisor, Charles A. Warren, of Brunswick, Maine, took over for a year.

From 1935 to 1937, Paul E. Melrose was the main conductor. He was part of the 5th US Infantry Band at Fort Williams as the warrant officer and band leader.

Dr. Russell Ames Cook was the first out-of-state conductor. An outgoing man, he befriended the "leading families" of the orchestra, and they helped him get support. During his tenure from 1938 until 1951, there was an increase in donations, supporters, and volunteers which were all essential to its success.

In 1952, the concertmaster and associate conductor of the Boston Symphony Orchestra, Richard Burgin, became the PSO's conductor. His legacy was to help improve the string section.

Rouben Gregorian took over in 1958, after Burgin's administration ended. He was a graduate of Central College in Iran, where he had been the co-founder and conductor of the Tehran Symphony Orchestra. As the main conductor of the Portland Symphony Orchestra, he finalized the enactment of a fully paid orchestra in 1959.

In 1962, Arthur Bennett Lipkin began his tenure. He was the first resident conductor and began the youth concerts. The orchestra was involved with Voice of America broadcasts, including a broadcast to Kyoto, Japan.

From 1967 until 1975, Paul Vermal was the main conductor. He conducted a five-day Canadian tour. He also introduced outdoor concerts and concert previews.

The Portland Symphony Orchestra developed a national reputation for its artistic quality during Bruce Hangen's subsequent tenure. He helped expand educational programs which attracted children of all ages. He also created and developed the Portland Symphony Chamber Orchestra. His administration lasted from 1976 until 1986.

Toshiyuki Shimada took over in 1986. He tightened the orchestra's grasp of symphonic masterworks and deepened its commitment to youth and family programming, while building higher on the firm music foundations left by his predecessors.

Robert Moody was the twelfth music director of the Portland Symphony from 2008 until 2018. He was a champion of new music, particularly the work of Mason Bates, and began the Discovery Concert series for families.

Eckart Preu is the thirteenth music director of the orchestra, having begun his tenure in the 2019–2020 season.

Other guest conductors:

- 1956–1958 guest conductors: Samuel Seineger, Rouben Gregorian, Attilio Poto, Francis Findlay
- 1966–1967 guest conductors: Charles Gabor, Elyakum Shapiro, Maurice Kaplow, Andrew Galos, Paul Vermel
- 1975–1976 guest conductors: Michael Palmer, Michael Charry, Claude Monteux, Bruce Hangen, Maurice Kaplow, Richard Williams, Tibor Pusztai
- 1985–1986 guest conductors: Robert Bernhardt, Toshiyuki Shimada, Robert Page, Catherine Comet, Paul Polivnick
