= Stephanie Childress =

Franco-British conductor

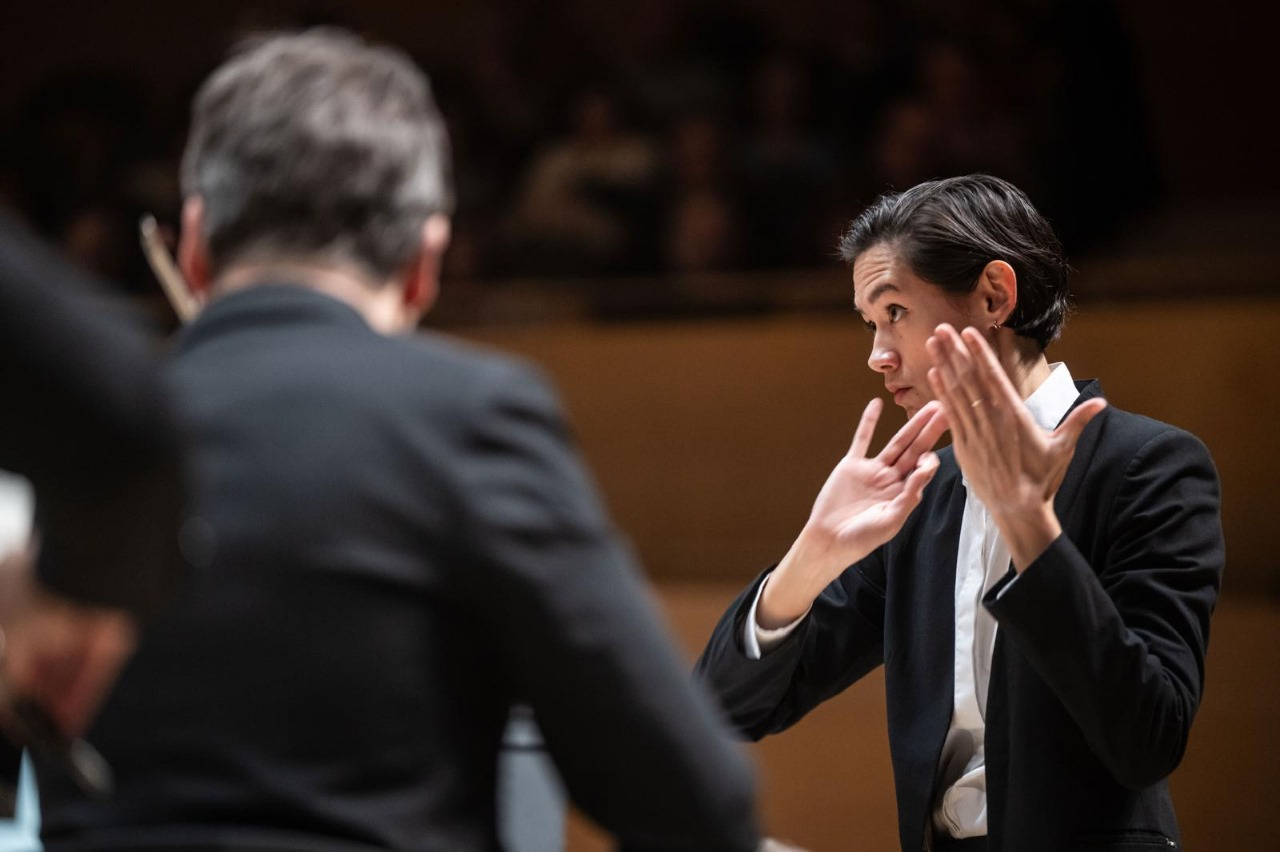
- Born: May 1999 (age 27); London, England
- Education: University of Cambridge
- Musical career
- Occupation: Conductor
- Instrument: Violin
- Website: www.stephaniechildress.com

Stephanie Childress (born May 1999) is a Franco-British conductor. She is the Principal Guest Conductor for the Barcelona Symphony Orchestra and National Orchestra of Catalonia.

== Early life and education ==
Childress was born in London to a non-musical family and began her career as a violinist. She attended the Lycée Français Charles de Gaulle, the Junior Department of the Royal College of Music and was a member of the National Youth Orchestra of Great Britain, eventually leading the orchestra in 2015. She was a string finalist in the BBC Young Musician of the Year competition in 2016 and 2018. She made her solo Proms debut in the summer of 2019.

In 2018, she graduated from the University of Cambridge with a bachelor's degree in music.

== Career ==
In 2018, Childress became professionally involved in opera, starting as the assistant conductor for British Youth Opera's 2018 production of Jeremy Sams' The Enchanted Island, before assisting on productions at Glyndebourne and at the English National Opera. She conducted Anna Semple's opera The Next Station is Green Park at the Royal Conservatoire of Scotland in 2019, Mozart's Le Nozze di Figaro and Don Giovanni at Glyndebourne in 2022 and 2023, and Missy Mazzoli's Breaking The Waves at Detroit Opera in 2024.

In September 2020, Childress won second prize at the first edition of the ‘La Maestra‘ competition in Paris. From 2020 to 2022, she made her debuts with the Philharmonia, the Liverpool Symphony Orchestra, London Symphony Orchestra, London Mozart Players, BBC Philharmonic, Orchestre de Paris, Orchestre National de Montpellier among others. She was the Assistant Conductor of the St. Louis Symphony Orchestra (SLSO) with Stephane Denève from 2020 to 2023. Childress also served as the music director of the St Louis Symphony Youth Orchestra.

In February 2022, she conducted the Barcelona Symphony Orchestra and National Orchestra of Catalonia and was subsequently appointed Principal Guest Conductor in December 2023. She was nominated in the category "Révélation chef d’orchestre" for the 2022 Victoires de la musique classique.>

In 2023, she made her German symphonic and operatic debuts with the Konzerthausorchester Berlin and performances of Mozart's Die Entführung aus dem Serail at the Hamburg Staatsoper.

In 2024, Childress made multiple North American debuts with orchestras such as the National Arts Centre Orchestra (Ottawa), Cleveland Orchestra, Cincinnati Symphony, Detroit Symphony, Baltimore Symphony and Minnesota Orchestra, as well as her Japanese debut with the Yomiuri Nippon Symphony Orchestra.
