= Valentina Peleggi =

Italian conductor (born 1983)

- Born: 1 January 1983 (age 43); Florence, Italy
- Education: Conservatorio Santa Cecilia; Accademia Musicale Chigiana; Royal Academy of Music
- Genres: Classical, Opera
- Occupation: Conductor
- Website: www.valentinapeleggi.com

Valentina Peleggi (born 1983) is an Italian conductor. She is the music director of the Richmond Symphony in Virginia. She previously was the resident conductor of the São Paulo State Symphony Orchestra and principal conductor of the São Paulo Symphony Chorus, and was a Mackerras Fellow at the English National Opera.

== Early life and education ==
Peleggi was born in Florence, Italy. She has stated that singing Orff's Carmina Burana as a child in Florence helped form her interest in conducting. She studied at the Conservatorio Santa Cecilia in Rome and the Accademia Musicale Chigiana in Siena. She later attended the Royal Academy of Music in London, where she was the first Italian woman to enter the conducting program. She won the Festival International de Inverno Campos do Jordão conducting prize in 2014 and was awarded the DipRAM for her final concert at the Royal Academy.

== Career ==
=== Early career and fellowships ===
In 2015, Peleggi was awarded the Taki Concordia Conducting Fellowship, now the Taki Alsop Conducting Fellowship, a mentorship program for female conductors led by Marin Alsop. She was later appointed Mackerras Fellow at the English National Opera in London and conducted productions including Carmen, La bohème, and Dido and Aeneas.

=== São Paulo Symphony Orchestra ===
From 2017 to 2018, Peleggi was the resident conductor of the São Paulo State Symphony Orchestra (OSESP) and from 2017 to 2019 was the principal conductor of the OSESP Chorus in Brazil. During her tenure, she earned the São Paulo Critics' Prize for Conductor of the Year.

=== Richmond Symphony ===
In 2020, Peleggi was appointed music director of the Richmond Symphony in Richmond, Virginia, becoming the first female music director in the orchestra's history. Her contract was renewed in 2023, extending her tenure through the 2027–2028 season. Peleggi's programming with the Richmond Symphony includes standard repertoire, contemporary music, and commissions.

=== Opera and guest conducting ===
Peleggi has guest conducted internationally, including with the Royal Philharmonic Orchestra, BBC National Orchestra of Wales, Dallas Symphony Orchestra, and Baltimore Symphony Orchestra.

In March 2019, she conducted the BBC National Orchestra of Wales in a concert for International Women's Day featuring works by women composers.

Her operatic work includes Italian repertoire, and she has expressed an affinity for works by Gioachino Rossini. In May 2024, she made her U.S. opera debut at Seattle Opera, conducting The Barber of Seville. Peleggi has conducted Rossini's Stabat Mater with the New Zealand Symphony Orchestra and the Tasmanian Symphony Orchestra.

== Discography ==
Peleggi conducted Heitor Villa-Lobos: Choral Transcriptions, an album with the São Paulo Symphony Choir released by Naxos in 2021.

== Honors ==
- 2015–2017: Taki Alsop Conducting Fellowship
- 2018: APCA Prize (São Paulo Society of Critics of Arts), Conductor of the Year
- 2018: Mackerras Fellowship, English National Opera
- 2023: Named one of Musical America's Top 30 Professionals of the Year
