= Austin Symphony Orchestra =

Orchestra based in Austin, Texas, U.S.

- Orchestra
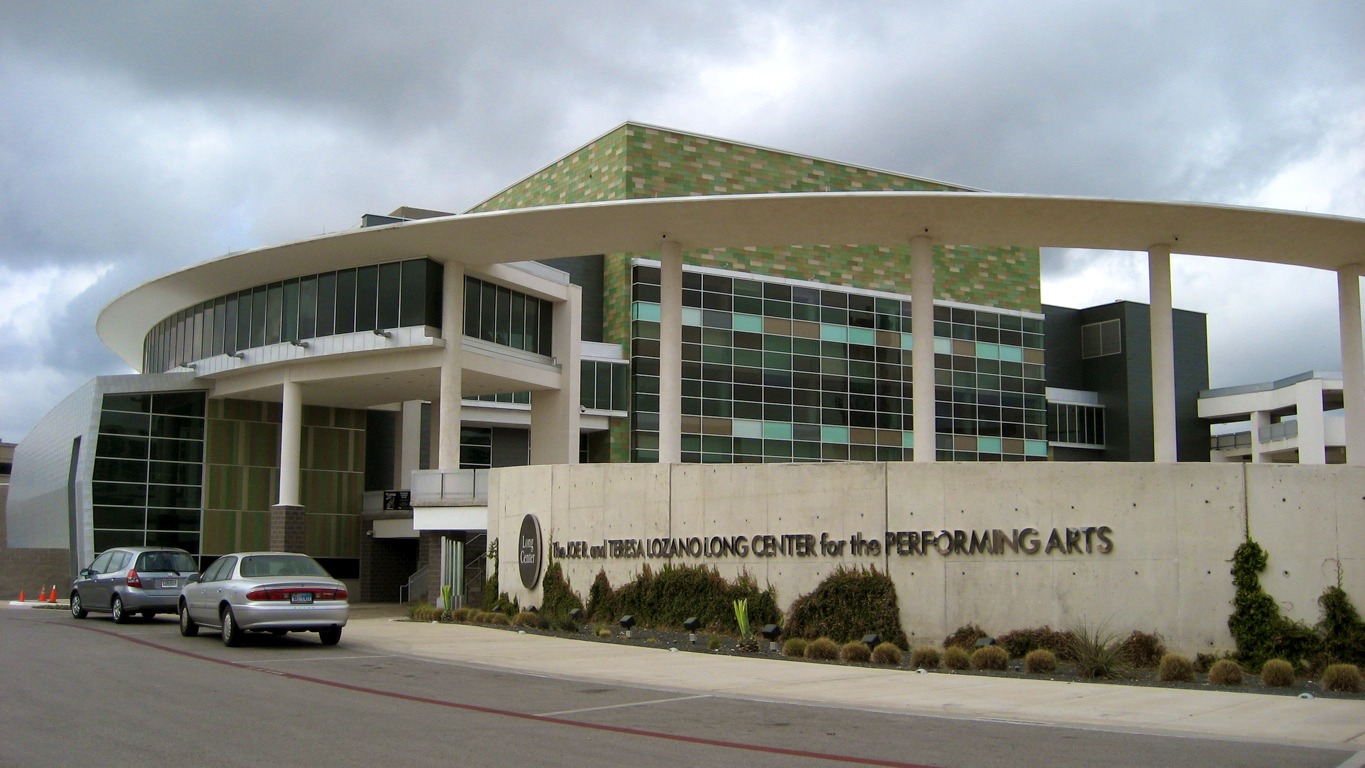
- Founded: 1911
- Location: Austin, Texas, U.S.
- Concert hall: Long Center for the Performing Arts
- Principal conductor: Peter Bay
- Music director: Peter Bay
- Website: www.austinsymphony.org

The Austin Symphony Orchestra is the oldest performing group in Austin, Texas, United States. It was founded in 1911.

Program of the inaugural concert of the Austin Syphmphony (then the Austin Symphony Society), 25 April 1911.

== History ==
The inaugural concert of the Austin Symphony Orchestra was held on April 25, 1911. Initially, the orchestra consisted of 28 unpaid members and an unpaid conductor. The orchestra now has over 90 members, but is still not a full-time orchestra. It was not until 1948 that a paid music director was appointed — Ezra Rachlin being the first appointee – and a regular concert series was presented. He remained in the post for 21 years, until 1969.

Rachlin organised a drive-in concert, the world's first, in 1948. The first children's concert was held in 1951.

The Centennial Gala Performance took place on April 28, 2011, with the violinist Itzhak Perlman as soloist, as well as a performance of Alexandre Luigini's Ballet égyptien, which had been played at the first performance a century earlier.

== Organization ==
The current, and eighth, music director is Peter Bay, who has been in the post since 1997. Past directors include Maurice Peress (1970–73), Akira Endo and Sung Kwak.

The symphony plays its regular season concerts in Dell Hall at the Long Center for the Performing Arts in downtown Austin.
