= Toshiyuki Shimada =

Japanese-American orchestral conductor

Toshiyuki Shimada (島田 俊行, Shimada Toshiyuki) is a Japanese-born American orchestral conductor. He is music director of both the Eastern Connecticut Symphony Orchestra in New London, CT; the Orchestra of the Southern Finger Lakes in Corning, NY; and the New Britain Symphony Orchestra. He had been music director of the Yale Symphony Orchestra of Yale University from 2005 to 2019, and currently he is director of orchestral activity at the Connecticut College. He is also music director laureate of the Portland Symphony Orchestra, in Portland, Maine, of which he was music director from 1986 to 2006. Prior to Portland, he was associate conductor of the Houston Symphony Orchestra for six years, beginning in 1981. He also serves as principal conductor of the Vienna Modern Masters, in Austria since 1998.

Shimada has been a frequent guest conductor of the European orchestras such as the Istanbul State Symphony Orchestra, the Presidential Orchestra of Turkey in Ankara, the Borussen Istanbul Philharmonic Orchestra, the Lithuanian State Symphony Orchestra, the Moravian Philharmonic Orchestra, the Bilkent Symphony Orchestra, the Izmir State Symphony Orchestra, the Karlovy Vary Symphony Orchestra, the Prague Chamber Orchestra, the Slovak Philharmonic, NÖ Tonkünstler Orchestra in Vienna, L'Orchestre national de Lille, in France, and the Royal Scottish National Orchestra at the Edinburgh Festival. He has conducted in Mexico, with la Orquesta Filhamonico de Jalisco in Guadalajara.

He has also guest conducted the Houston Symphony, Honolulu Symphony Orchestra, Chautauqua Symphony Orchestra, Knoxville Symphony Orchestra, San Jose Symphony Orchestra, Boston Pops Orchestra, Pacific Symphony, Edmonton Symphony Orchestra, and many other US and Canadian orchestras. He has collaborated with distinguished artists such as Itzhak Perlman, Andre Watts, Emanual Ax, Yefim Bronfman, Peter Serkin, Idil Biret, Janos Starker, Joshua Bell, Hilary Hahn, Nadjia Salerno-Sonnenberg, Cho-Liang Lin, James Galway, Evelyn Glennie, Barry Tuckwell, and Doc Severinsen.

In addition to these activities, he has held the position as artistic advisor of Tulare Country Symphony Orchestra, music director of the Nassau Symphony Orchestra, in New York, music director of the Cambiata Soloists, a contemporary music ensemble in Houston, music director of the Shepherd School Symphony Orchestra at Rice University, and music director of the Young Musicians Foundation Debut Orchestra in Los Angeles.

== Awards and honors ==
He was a finalist in the 1979 Herbert von Karajan conducting competition in Berlin as well as a fellow conductor in the Los Angeles Philharmonic Institute in 1983. He has received many awards and honors, such as Ariel Musician of the Year in 2003 from Ariel Records, the ASCAP award, Portland Fire Department's Merit Award, the Maine Publicity Bureau Cultural Award, the Italian Heritage Society Cultural Award, Toshiyuki Shimada Day in Houston, Toshiyuki Shimada Week in Portland, Maine, and Toshiyuki Shimada Day in the state of Maine. In May 2006, he was awarded an honorary doctorate degree in fine arts by the Maine College of Arts.

== Recording activities ==
Shimada is very active in the recording industry, namely with the Naxos, the complete Paul Hindemith Piano Concerti with Idil Biret and Yale Symphony Orchestra, and the Vienna Modern Masters label, conducting the Moravian Philharmonic, and currently he has fourteen Compact Discs. The newest CD titled "Toshiyuki Shimada Conducts" has been issued in April, 2007. He also records for the Capstone Records and the Albany Records labels. His recording of Renaissance, Baroque and Classical works with the Prague Chamber Orchestra and Prague Chamber Singers will soon to be released by the Trinity Music Partners, LLC, in the Vatican Music Library Collection label.

== Education ==
Shimada has studied with many conductors, including Leonard Bernstein, Herbert von Karajan, Herbert Blomstedt, Hans Swarovsky, Michael Tilson Thomas, Sergiu Commisiona and David Whitwell.

He was born in Tokyo and moved to the United States when he was 15. He has attended the University of Southern California, California State University, Northridge, and the University of Vienna for Music and Performing Art. He has also studied the clarinet with Dominick Fera in California and Rudolf Jettel in Vienna. He was selected as a fellow conductor for the Herbert Blomsted International Conducting Institute, and the Los Angeles Philharmonic Institute.

== Teaching positions ==
In the educational field, he has held a position of Associate Professor of Conducting in both the Yale School of Music and Department of Music in Yale University from 2005 to 2019. In the past, he has taught at the University of Southern Maine and Rice University, and was Artist Faculty of the Texas Institute of the Aesthetic Study.
