= American Russian Young Artists Orchestra =

Training orchestra in New York, US

- Orchestra
- Short name: ARYO
- Former name: American Soviet Youth Orchestra, American Russian Youth Orchestra
- Founded: 1987
- Disbanded: 2003
- Location: New York, United States

The American Russian Young Artists Orchestra (ARYO), founded in 1987 as the American Soviet Youth Orchestra, was a philanthropic and diplomatic training orchestra for young musicians, vocalists and conductors from the United States and the former Soviet Union, primarily Russia.

The organization held annual open auditions across both countries for "highly talented Russian and American musicians and vocalists, ages 17-25," gathering them "for an intensive three-week rehearsal period under the direction of leading Russian and American conductors," including "language training, cross-cultural orientation and homestays" prior to an annual summertime world tour.

During its sixteen-year run, the orchestra performed at over 50 concert venues in Washington, New York, Miami, Minneapolis, Nashville, Chicago, Los Angeles, Amsterdam, Vienna, Milan, Moscow, St. Petersburg, Novosibirsk, Yekaterinburg, Kazan, Ulianovsk, Samara, Kaliningrad, Yerevan, Tolyatti, Tallinn, Riga, and Yurmala. In several cities, ARYO included the first westerners to perform in decades, owing to restrictions on cultural exchange for much of the Soviet period. Notable appearances also included free concerts at venues such as the United States Capitol West Lawn, the Mann Music Center, Mizner Park in Boca Raton, New York's World Financial Center, and the Hollywood Bowl.

From its inception to its disbanding, ARYO was led by a board of directors including Henry Luce III and honorarily co-chaired by the first ladies of the respective named countries (initially Nancy Reagan and Raisa Gorbacheva and ultimately Laura Bush and Lyudmila Putina).

== History ==
The American Soviet Youth Orchestra was founded at Oberlin College in 1987 by Moscow State Conservatory director Boris Kulikov, Oberlin President S. Frederick Starr, and diplomats Grace Kennan Warnecke and Edythe Holbrook as part of a surge in Soviet-American cultural exchanges following the loosening of Cold War tensions during the period. Their first performance was on August 5, 1988, at the Kennedy Center for the Performing Arts in Washington, D.C., conducted by Zubin Mehta. The organization soon became a full-fledged year-round operation including chamber tours, residencies, and extensive community outreach programs in leading venues around the globe.

In 1992, shortly after the fall of the Soviet Union, the organization regrouped as the American Russian Young Artists Orchestra (ARYO) with Holbrook as executive director. The American Russian Young Artist Orchestra was able to hold open auditions instead of holding auditions in only the Moscow Conservatory. Now they were holding them in 6 different conservatories across Russia.

In 1997, First Ladies Hillary Clinton and Naina Yeltsina joined ARYO in Yekaterinburg, Russia for their only appearance together without their spouse presidents.

In 1998 the orchestra expanded to include a chamber orchestra which participated in the World Youth Music Forum at the invitation of the Russian Ministry of Culture and Moscow Mayor Yuri M. Luzhkov. There ARYO joined nine other youth orchestras representing every continent to form a thousand-member "Orchestra of the World," which presented a concert in Red Square. ARYO also played the 1998 Moscow Youth Olympics.

In 1999 ARYO embarked on a world tour they called "Millennium Muzik," during which they visited twelve cities across the United States, Russia, and Central Europe. They performed works by Szymanowski, Duke Ellington, Stravinsky, Barber, and Rachmaninoff, joining the Kirov Orchestra In St. Petersburg, Russia. Baseball Hall of Fame member Tom Seaver emceed their gala benefit at Alice Tully Hall in New York City.

In 2001, ARYO became affiliated with Bard College and came under the musical direction of its president, Leon Botstein.

In 2002 Holbrook retired and Christine Loomis took the helm as executive director, and ARYO launched a trio known as the Amirus players. That summer during its annual world tour, ARYO performed in Asheville, North Carolina for the first time, with an ensemble that included two performers from Ashevile's sister city Vladikavkaz.

== Notable conductors ==
- Leon Botstein
- Valery Gergiev
- Dmitri Kitayenko
- Zubin Mehta
- Leonid Nikolaev
- Constantine Orbelian
- Eckart Preu
- Leonard Slatkin
- Hugh Wolff

== Alumni ==
ARYO alumni can be found in the world's leading musical organizations, including the New World Symphony, the Boston Symphony, the Chicago Symphony, the Los Angeles Philharmonic, the Philadelphia Orchestra, the Hong Kong Philharmonic, the St. Petersburg Philharmonic, the Ural Philharmonic, the Novosibirsk Symphony, the Bolshoi Orchestra, the Kirov Orchestra, and the United States Marine Corps Band. Others have pursued careers in international relations.

=== Notable alumni ===
- Joshua Bell
- Mikhail Simonyan
