= Orchestra of the Southern Finger Lakes =

- Orchestra
- Short name: OSFL
- Founded: 1995
- Principal conductor: Toshiyuki Shimada
- Website: www.osfl.org

The Orchestra of the Southern Finger Lakes (OSFL) is an orchestra based in Corning, New York in New York's Finger Lakes region and is part of the larger group known as the Corning-Elmira Musical Arts, Inc. (CEMA). It is currently conducted by Toshiyuki Shimada. It often holds concerts at the Clemens Center in Elmira and the Corning Museum of Glass. It also has a companion youth orchestra, the Youth Orchestra of the Southern Finger Lakes.

== History ==
The Orchestra of the Southern Finger Lakes was formed in 1995 when the Elmira Symphony and the Corning Philharmonic Society merged along with their companion choirs. Marietta Cheng was the director of the orchestra from 1995 to 2008

On February 14, 2012, a car crashed into the administrative office of the OSFL, with several employees of the orchestra inside. There were no major injuries.

== New Music ==
The orchestra frequently plays music by living composers, and has collaborated with several composers to commission new works.

It was announced at the end of their 2012–2013 season that William P. Perry would have one of his works premiered by the orchestra at the Corning Museum of Glass in its 2013–2014 season. The composed piece was his Market Street Overture, which was premiered on May 10, 2014, at the Corning Museum of Glass, inspired by Market Street in Corning.

The youth orchestra performed music composed by an alumnus of the youth orchestra during their 2016–2017 season, playing Jeffrey Zane Hansen's percussion ensemble piece Mensuration Canon and premiering and commissioning his orchestral work Sonderous Crossroads.
