= Marr and Colton =

The Marr & Colton Company was a producer of theater pipe organs, located in Warsaw, New York. The firm was founded in 1915 by David Jackson Marr and John J. Colton. The company built between 500 and 600 organs for theatres, churches, auditoriums, radio stations, and homes.

== History ==
David Marr was born in London in 1882. He served seven years as an apprentice in an organ-building firm in Edinburgh, where he learned every phase of pipe organ construction. In 1904, he moved to the United States where he acquired employment with the Skinner Organ Company in Boston. He later worked for the Hope-Jones Electric Organ Company, owned by Robert Hope-Jones, who made many initial innovations in the development of the "Unit Orchestra," later to become known as the '"Theatre Organ." While working for Hope-Jones, Marr met John Colton.

The Hope-Jones firm was eventually sold to the Wurlitzer Company in North Tonawanda, New York, and David Marr and John Colton joined the Wurlitzer team. For two-and-one-half years, David Marr worked for Wurlitzer, ultimately becoming factory superintendent.

Tempted by the prospect of operating his own company, Marr opened the Marr and Colton Organ Company in Warsaw, New York, in 1915. John Colton was with the new company from the beginning, but contrary to popular notion, did not invest any money in the new organization.

The first theatre organ produced by the company was for the Oatka Theatre in Warsaw. At the height of its operation in the 1920s, the company had branch offices in New York City, Detroit, and Hollywood, and employed some 375 people. David Marr would often attend the opening of a new theatre in which one of his instruments was installed. Occasionally, he would do the final tuning in the theatre before the grand opening.

Marr was awarded a U.S. Patent (Number 1,762,274) in June, 1930 for "...an organ having an improved stop mechanism of such character as to make it easy for any organist to quickly select and render the correct tone colors for any desired musical action, mood, or emotion." The idea was that there would be stops labeled by the mood of the scene in a silent movie that the organist was playing to accompany. There would be stops such as "anger," "jealousy," etc. in the hope that an organist unfamiliar with the stop list of the instrument could set the "correct" mood for the scene with the press of a stop key. The concept was marketed as a "Symphonic Registrator" organ, but few of these instruments were sold.

The company's largest organ was a 5-manual, 24-rank, which was installed in the Rochester Theatre, in Rochester, New York in 1927. The theatre was demolished in 1964, and the organ sold.

The onset of the Great Depression in the early 1930s, combined with the advent of "talking pictures" (movies with soundtracks), meant that sales for the Marr & Colton Company began to decline drastically.

In 1932, John Colton left the firm to join the Kilgen Organ Company in St. Louis as a salesman, and died shortly after. Operations ceased at the Warsaw plant in the fall of 1932. David Marr set up a shop in his home cellar and garage, performing organ repair work. He serviced organs in churches and homes, and even purchased refurbished and sold used pipe organs until he died on December 20, 1951.

The former Marr and Colton factory building in Warsaw, NY became the home of a button-manufacturing company for a time; however, by the early 1960s the building lay abandoned.

== Current organ installations ==
This list is incomplete. You can help by expanding it.

- Ohio Theatre, Toledo, Ohio
- Clemens Center, Elmira, New York
- Arcada Theater Building, St. Charles, Illinois
- The Chevalier Theatre, Medford, Massachusetts
- The Jane Pickens Theater & Event Center, Newport, Rhode Island www.janepickens.com
- The Grand Theater, East Greenville, PA www.thegrandtheater.org/history
- Thomaston Opera House, Thomaston, CT
- Methodist Church, Bolivar, NY

== Former organ locations ==
- Leow's Rochester Theatre, Rochester, New York
- Capitol Theater, Wheeling, West Virginia
- Roosevelt Theater 887 Broadway (4/18), Buffalo, New York
- Saint Patrick Catholic Church, 721 Main St, Watsonville, California, 95076 (2 manuals; replaced in 1974 with a new 2-manual instrument by the Wicks Organ Company; some, but not a lot, of the original pipes were incorporated into the Wicks Organ.)
- Palace Theatre, Danbury, CT
- Immanuel Lutheran Church, Bristol, Connecticut, (installed 1930, replaced in 1974-75 by a new three manual instrument from Austin Organs.) Some ranks from the church's Marr and Colton organ survived removal and are currently installed in the organ at the Thomaston Opera House, Thomaston, Connecticut.
