= Yale Symphony Orchestra =

American symphony orchestra (founded 1965)

- Symphony orchestra
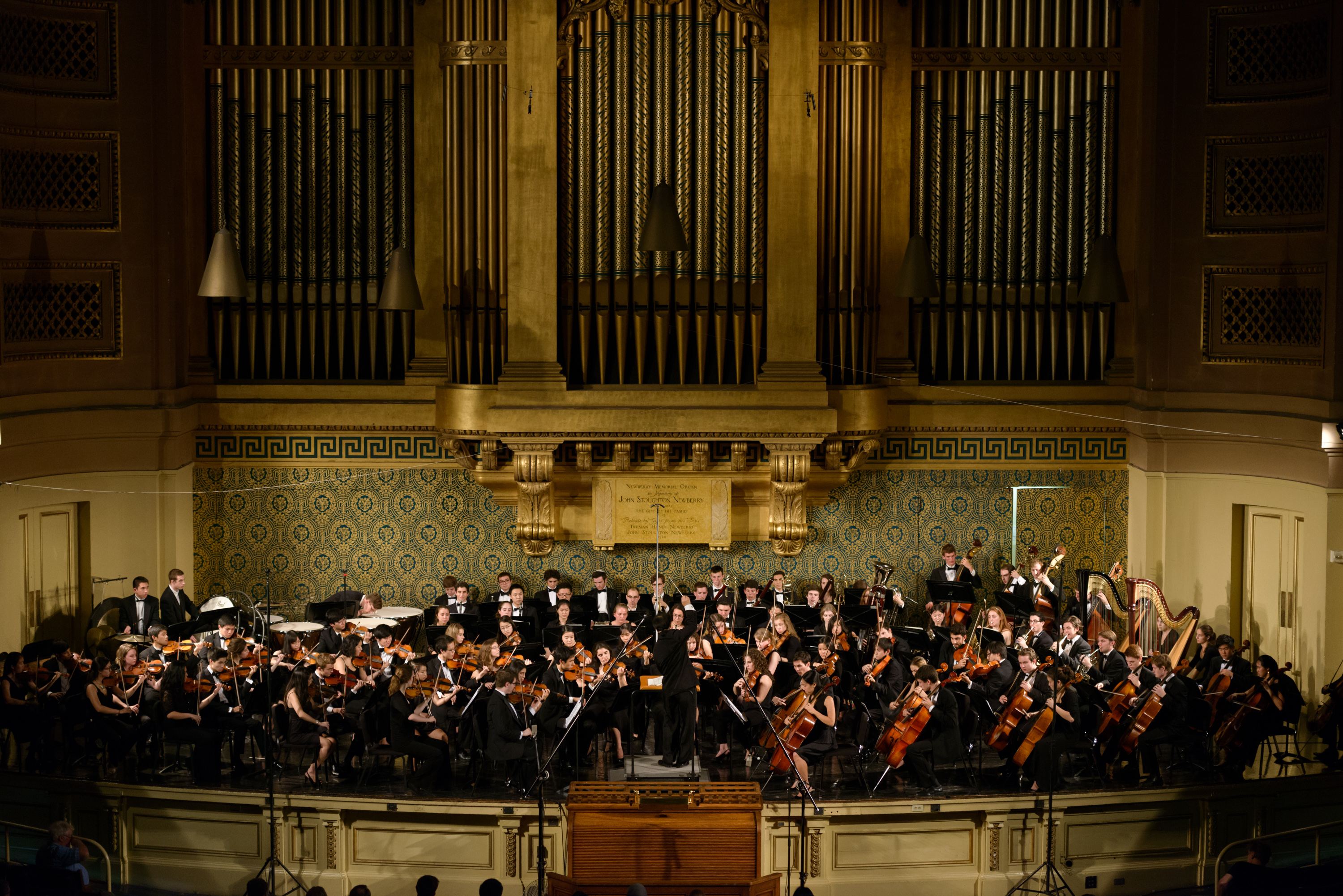
- The Yale Symphony Orchestra in 2014
- Short name: YSO
- Former name: Yale Symphonic Society
- Founded: 1965; 61 years ago
- Location: New Haven, Connecticut, U.S.
- Concert hall: Woolsey Hall, Yale University
- Music director: Elizabeth Askren
- Website: yso.yale.edu

The Yale Symphony Orchestra (YSO) is a symphony orchestra at Yale University which performs in Yale's Woolsey Hall and tours domestically and internationally. Its current music director is Elizabeth Askren.

== History ==
The Yale Symphony Orchestra was founded in 1965 by a small group of Yale students who sensed the need for an ensemble devoted to the performance of orchestral repertoire. It developed from Yale's Calhoun College Chamber Music Orchestra, when three of its members sought to expand the orchestra to provide an opportunity for larger-scale orchestral performances.

In its first campus-wide incarnation, the Yale Symphony Orchestra was known as the Yale Symphonic Society. It was originally composed of both undergraduates and graduate students from the Yale School of Music, in contrast to its primarily undergraduate population today. By 1967, the campus had begun to refer to the Yale Symphonic Society as the Yale Symphony Orchestra instead, and the orchestra had instated Richmond Browne as its first permanent conductor.

The following years saw growth for the orchestra as the former undergraduate and then-graduate student John Mauceri (class of 1967) replaced Browne as conductor in the fall of 1968. Mauceri's adventurous programming helped the orchestra expand its membership and its popularity on campus. In 1971, the orchestra traveled to France for its first international tour; domestic and international tours have continued to the present day.

== Current status ==
The membership of today's Yale Symphony Orchestra is composed primarily of undergraduates who audition in early September and are "tapped", a scaled-down version of the selection of a cappella groups, shortly thereafter. Yale Symphony Orchestra rehearsals take place twice a week for two and a half hours in Woolsey Hall. The orchestra performs five regular concerts per season, with programming varying from the traditional (such as Beethoven's Symphony No. 6) to the adventurous (such as Ligeti's Apparitions).

Its Halloween Show has become a campus-wide tradition: the orchestra spends the months leading up to Halloween shooting and editing a silent film, which they perform a soundtrack to, with selections ranging from repertoire staples to arrangements of pop songs, and screen at 11:59 p.m. on October 31 in Woolsey Hall. Cameo appearances in the films have included the actors Sarah Jessica Parker and James Franco, the singer-songwriters Alanis Morissette and Paul McCartney, and the politicians John Kerry, Hillary Clinton, and John McCain.

On March 31, 2007, the Yale Symphony Orchestra became the first undergraduate orchestra to perform as the featured orchestra in Video Games Live.

== Conductors ==
The following conductors have served as Music Directors of the Yale Symphony Orchestra:

- Richmond Browne (1967–1968)
- John Mauceri (1968–1974) – class of 1967
- C. William Harwood (1974–1977)
- Robert Kapilow (1977–1983) – class of 1970
- Leif Bjaland (1983–1986)
- Alasdair Neale (1986–1989)
- David Stern (1989–1990)
- James Ross (1990–1994)
- James Sinclair (1994–1995)
- Shinik Hahm (1995–2004)
- George Rothman (2004–2005)
- Toshiyuki Shimada (2005–2019)
- William Boughton (2019–2025)
- Elizabeth Askren (2025–present)

== Notable premieres ==
Throughout its history, the Yale Symphony Orchestra has performed new music as well as staples of orchestral repertoire. Examples of some notable world and regional premieres are:

- Leonard Bernstein's Mass, 1973 – European premiere
- Charles Ives's Three Places in New England – definitive restoration
- Claude Debussy's Khamma – United States premiere
- Benjamin Britten's The Building of the House – East Coast premiere
- Anthony Heinrich's The Columbiad, or Migration of American Wild Passenger Pigeons – North American premiere

== Alumni and soloists ==
- Marin Alsop – conductor; principal conductor of the Vienna Radio Symphony Orchestra
- Leopold Stokowski – conductor
- Gilbert Levine – conductor
- Luciano Berio – composer
- Ralph Kirshbaum – cellist
- Sophie Shao – cellist
- Russell Powell – cellist
- Frederica von Stade – mezzo-soprano
- Susan Davenny-Wyner – soprano
- Emanuel Ax – pianist
- Peter Frankl – pianist
- İdil Biret – pianist
- Boris Berman – pianist
- John Kirkpatrick – pianist
- Melvin Chen – pianist
- Syoko Aki – violinist
- Sharon Yamada – violinist
- Tokyo String Quartet – string quartet
- David Shifrin – clarinetist
- Dawn Upshaw – soprano
