= Alena Hron =

Czech conductor, violinist, pianist, singer, and composer (born 1992)

Alena Hron (née Alena Jelínková; born 10 September 1992) is a Czech conductor, violinist, pianist, singer and composer. Since the 2024–25 season, she serves as the chief conductor of the South Bohemian Philharmonic.

== Life ==
She graduated in conducting from the Prague Conservatory, where her teachers included Miriam Němcová, Hynek Farkač, and Miroslav Košler. She subsequently continued her studies at the Academy of Performing Arts in Prague under Tomáš Koutník, Leoš Svárovský, and Zbyněk Müller. She spent a year studying at the Norwegian Academy of Music (Norges musikkhøgskole) in Oslo (under Ole Kristian Ruud and Sigmund Thorp). She also completed conducting masterclasses led by Vasily Petrenko, Christian Ehwald, Stefan Parkman, and Grete Pedersen.

She collaborates with symphonic orchestras in the Czech Republic, including the Prague Symphony Orchestra (FOK), the Czech Radio Symphony Orchestra, the Janáček Philharmonic Orchestra, PKF – Prague Philharmonia, the Bohuslav Martinů Philharmonic Zlín, the Hradec Králové Philharmonic, the Plzeň Philharmonic, the West Bohemian Symphony Orchestra, and others.

She made her debut at the Prague Spring Festival in 2023, conducting the Prague Symphony Orchestra (FOK) in a performance of works by Sergei Prokofiev: Romeo and Juliet, Suite No. 2 from the ballet, Op. 64ter, Jan Novák's Capriccio for Cello and Orchestra, and Ottorino Respighi's Pines of Rome.

In early 2024, she was awarded the Taki Alsop Conducting Fellowship, studying under the American conductor Marin Alsop. Abroad, she has conducted orchestras such as the Südwestdeutsche Philharmonie Konstanz, the Göttinger Symphonieorchester, Collegium Musicum Basel, and the Košice State Philharmonic.

== Works of Vítězslava Kaprálová ==
Alena Hron conducted the complete recording of the orchestral works of Vítězslava Kaprálová. This recording was made in May and June 2022 with the Janáček Philharmonic Ostrava and was released by the German label Classic Produktion Osnabrück (CPO) in 2024. The recording won the Diapason d'Or de l'Année award in 2025.

Alena Hron appears in the feature-length documentary film Kaprálová by Petr Záruba. The film includes footage of rehearsals for the Piano Concerto in D minor, Op. 7, and the Military Sinfonietta, Op. 11, performed by the Janáček Philharmonic Ostrava, as well as the Christmas Prelude (Prélude de Noël) performed by the South Bohemian Philharmonic.
