= La Maestra (music competition) =

Music competition for women conductors

La Maestra is a music competition for women conductors, held in Paris, France. Co-founded in 2019 by the Philharmonie de Paris and the Paris Mozart Orchestra, it has been held biennially since 2020. The directors are Claire Gibault, founder and director of the Paris Mozart Orchestra, and Olivier Mantei, general manager of the Cité de la Musique – Philharmonie de Paris.

The competition is the subject of the 2023 documentary film Maestra, directed by Maggie Contreras.

== History ==
The first La Maestra competition was originally scheduled for March 2020 but was postponed by several months because of the COVID-19 pandemic. The competition eventually took place from 15 to 18 September 2020 in the Philharmonie de Paris in the great Pierre Boulez Hall. Initially, more than 200 candidates from 51 countries participated. After the preliminary rounds, 12 candidates were selected.

The jury is equally staffed by women and men every year. The 2020 jury was led by Ewa Bogusz-Moore. In addition to Claire Gibault the jury in 2020 included conductors Marin Alsop and Elizabeth Askren, as well as conductors Jean-Claude Casadesus and Lionel Bringuier. In 2022, the jury was chaired by Deborah Borda. In 2024, the jury was led by Nathalie Stutzmann. Other jury members included Claire Gibault, Kirill Karabits and Leonard Slatkin. In 2026, the jury was chaired by Oksana Lyniv.

The orchestra participating in the competition is the Paris Mozart Orchestra, founded by Claire Gibault.

The various stages of the competition are recorded by ARTE each year.

== Winners ==
Year	1st prize	2nd prize	3rd prize
2020	Rebecca Tong (USA/Indonesia)	Stephanie Childress (Great Britain/France)	Lina González-Granados (Colombia)
2022	Anna Sułkowska–Migoń (Poland)	Joanna Natalia Slusarczyk (Poland)	Beatriz Fernández Aucejo (Spain)
2024	Bar Avni (Israel)	Liubov Nosova (Russia)	Katharina Morin (Germany)
2026	Mojca Lavrenčič (Slovenia)	Jiajing Lai (China)	Alizé Léhon (France)
