= Richmond Symphony Youth Orchestra =

The Richmond Symphony Youth Orchestra Program (YOP) is an American youth orchestra program based in Richmond, Virginia. YOP is sponsored by the Richmond Symphony.

== History ==
The Richmond Symphony Youth Orchestra was founded in the spring of 1962 by Edgar Schenkman and is the oldest youth orchestra in the state of Virginia. It was a partnership between the Richmond Symphony Orchestra and Richmond Public Schools. The schools provided the venues, students, and music stands, and the Richmond Symphony provided Edgar Schenkman and the rest of the artistic leadership. While originally only one orchestra, by 1981 had expanded to three orchestras, the original Richmond Symphony Youth Orchestra, the Richmond Symphony Youth Concert Orchestra, and the Richmond Symphony String Sinfonietta. In 2004, a fourth ensemble was added, the Richmond Symphony Camerata Strings. In 2008, the Richmond Symphony Youth Orchestra played at the Kennedy Center with the Richmond Symphony Orchestra to celebrate the 50th anniversary of the Richmond Symphony. YOP created a fifth ensemble, the wind ensemble, in 2018 for young wind players looking to explore orchestra literature.

== Orchestras ==
The orchestras accept students up through 12th grade. All five ensembles meet weekly and participate in coaching and masterclasses by Richmond Symphony musicians, mentoring, and other activities. The orchestras are the top orchestral training ensembles of central Virginia.

String Sinfonietta: Conducted by Christie-Jo Adams. The String Sinfonietta is an all-string ensemble for young musicians, originally conducted by Joseph Wargo from 1983 to 2004.

Camerata Strings: "Camerata" was created as an intermediate strings-intensive group to fill a gap between Sinfonietta and the upper level groups, and was done so purposely for Joseph Wargo in 2004, whereupon he left his former founding group (where current conductor Christie-Jo Adams was an early Sinfonietta player) and served as founding conductor of Camerata Strings from 2004 to the time of his retirement from formal pedagogy in 2008; at which time the group responsibilities were undertaken by current conductor Rebecca Jilcott. Camerata Strings is an all-string ensemble. (Edit 5/15/24 by Madeleine Veronique Davopoulos "formerly Wargo"; widow of Joseph Wargo, and former accompanist of both groups.

Wind Ensemble: The newest of Richmond's ensembles, Wind Ensemble caters to beginning wind players. It is conducted by Christopher Moseley.

Youth Concert Orchestra (YCO): Conducted by Sandy Goldie. YOP's lower-level full orchestra.

Richmond Symphony Youth Orchestra (RSYO): Conducted by Richmond Symphony Orchestra Assistant Conductor, Daniel Myssyk. RSYO is YOP's top level full orchestra.

== See also ==
- Richmond Symphony Orchestra

== Sources ==
Halbruner, Aimee. "Slideshow of RSYO at the Kennedy Center." E-mail to Kristin Grasberger.3 June 2008.

"Richmond Symphony Youth Orchestras." Richmond Symphony. 2008. Richmond Symphony Orchestra. 8 Jun 2008 <http://www.richmondsymphony.com/youth_orch.asp>.
