= Lina González-Granados =

Lina González-Granados is a Colombian-American conductor.

She was born and raised in Santiago de Cali, Colombia. She studied in Bogotá and at the New England Conservatory and Boston University. Her mentors have included Riccardo Muti, Yannick Nézet-Séguin, Bernard Haitink, Bramwell Tovey, and Marin Alsop.

In 2014 she founded a Latin American orchestra in Boston, the Unitas Ensemble.

From 2020 to 2023 Lina González-Granados was 'Sir Georg Solti Conducting Apprentice' with the Chicago Symphony Orchestra after winning the CSO Association’s International Sir Georg Solti Conducting Competition in 2019. She has been back to conduct the orchestra since.

Since 2022 she has been Resident Conductor of the LA Opera.

She has conducted the Minnesota Orchestra, the Royal Stockholm Philharmonic Orchestra, the Phoenix and New Jersey Symphonies, the National Symphony Orchestra of Ireland, Canada's NAC Orchestra, the Chicago Symphony Orchestra and the San Antonio Philharmonic, as well as Opera Philadelphia, Orchestre Métropolitain de Montréal, Sarasota Orchestra, Orchestre Philharmonique de Liège, Orchestre Symphonique de Québec, Orquesta Sinfonica de Galicia, and the Aalborg, Atlanta, Indianapolis, and New World symphony orchestras.

Lina González-Granados is represented by Opus 3 Artists.

== Awards ==
Lina González-Granados is the recipient of the 2020 La Maestra Competition’s third and Echo prizes, the 2021 Sphinx Medal of Excellence, the 2020 and 2021 Solti Foundation U.S. Career Assistance Award, and held the Taki Alsop Conducting Fellowship from 2017–2019.
