= Ohio Theatre (Toledo, Ohio) =

- U.S. National Register of Historic Places

- Location within Ohio Location within the United States
- Location: 3114 Lagrange St, Toledo, Ohio
- Coordinates: 41°40′45″N 83°32′25″W
- Built: 1921
- Architect: Stophlet and Stophlet, Anthony Kocherowski, et al.
- Architectural style: Classical Revival
- NRHP reference No.: 06000198
- Added to NRHP: March 29, 2006

The Ohio Theatre is located at 3112 Lagrange St in the Toledo's Polish International Village of Toledo, Ohio. Built in 1921, it is Toledo's last operating neighborhood theatre. This three-story brick and stone masonry building comprises 8,000 square feet (740 m^{2}) and features stadium seating, the original Mighty 90 carbon arc 35mm movie projectors, and the Marr and Colton pipe organ originally installed in the razed Rivoli Theatre in downtown Toledo. The theatre has a spacious 40' by 60' thrust stage with a 10' by 20' orchestra platform. It was listed on the National Register of Historic Places in 2006.

== Location ==
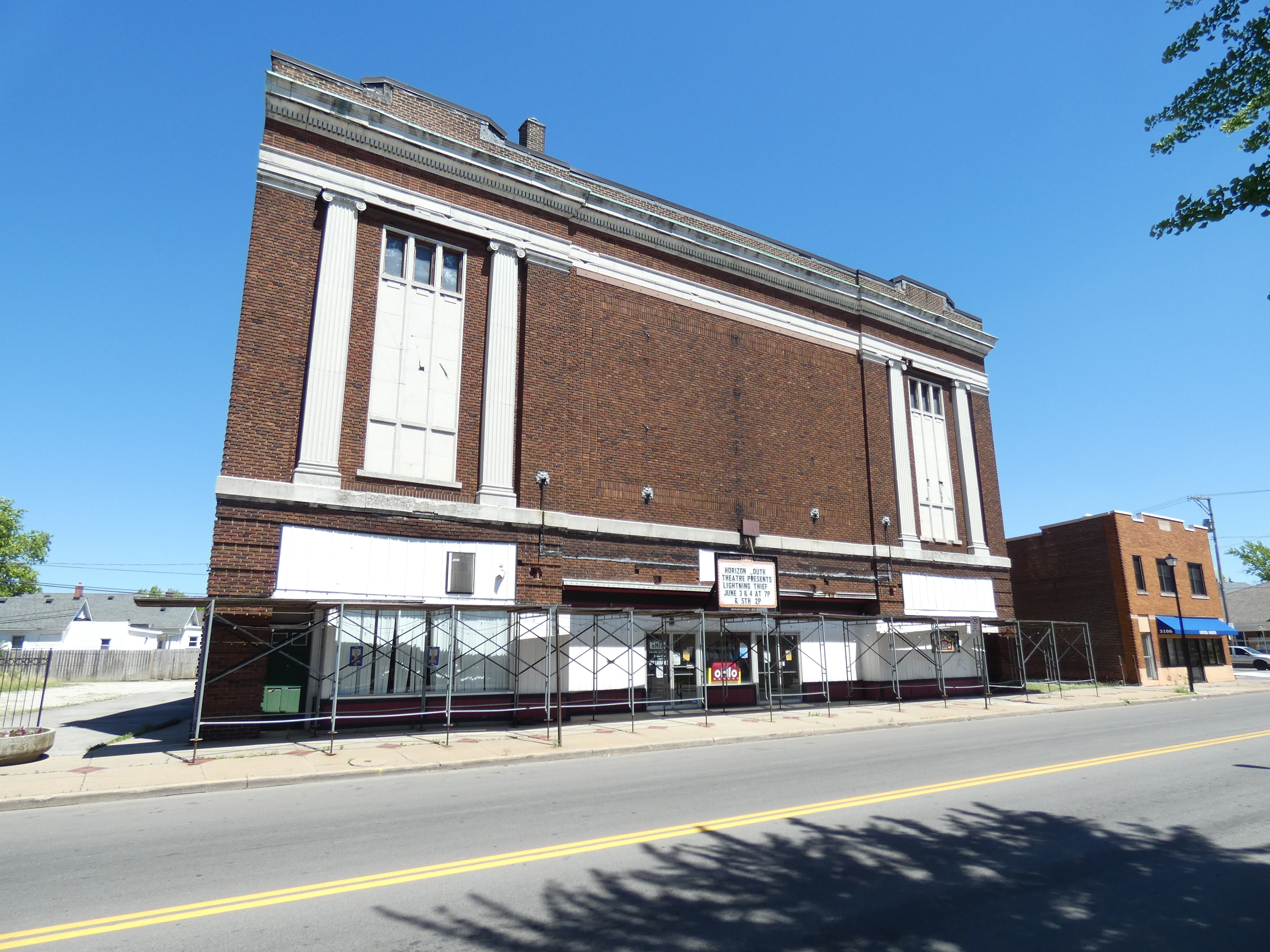
Theatre in 2022

The Ohio Theatre is located in Toledo's Polish International Village on Lagrange Street, the center of Toledo's largest concentration of people of Polish ancestry for over 130 years. The Ohio Theatre is a neighborhood asset and historical treasure that has been a source of entertainment for Toledo area residents — from vaudeville and silent films to movies and weekly serials, and even performing arts.

== History ==
Ohio Theatre's Opening

The Ohio Theatre was built by the Lagrange Street Amusement Company, opening its doors on February 28, 1921, featuring the Douglas Fairbanks film, The Mark of Zorro. Admission, including the War Tax, was 25 cents for adults and 15 cents for children. It was the largest neighborhood theatre in the country at the time.

It is best remembered as a movie house and remains Toledo's only historic operating neighborhood theatre. In 1929 Toledo had 41 indoor movie houses. While the country was experiencing the Great Depression, movie houses such as the Ohio Theatre offered quite an entertainment value. The Ohio Theatre still features the original deluxe red brick façade with Greek columns, a loading dock with overhead doors, the original wood seats with the original aisle lighting, the original side wall sconces and the original projection booth with a newsreel work bench. It has the same footprint as when it was built in 1921.

The Lagrange Street Amusement Company was dissolved by court order in 1923 and sold at public auction to Rosa Bialorucki, the only bidder and one of the five investors in the Lagrange Street Amusement Company. The Bialorucki family owned the theatre until 1974 when it was acquired by the Catholic Diocese of Toledo. It was sold to the Ohio Theatre, Inc., a non-profit management board in 2004, and sold again in 2009 to United North, formerly known as the Lagrange Development Corporation, a non-profit community development corporation. United North went out of business in 2019. The Ohio Theatre was purchased by Children's Theatre Workshop (CTW) in Nov 2020. They perform all their plays and musicals at the location as well as rent it for theatre, arts, dance, music, and other events. CTW received a $2.5 million grant to work on the marquee, the facade along with some campus improvements.

== Notable events ==
- 1928 the movie Louise and the Haunted House required crowd control with people standing in line from 1 to 9 pm on New Year's Day.
- 1950 Dale Evans, Roy Rogers and Trigger (Roy's horse) appeared at the Ohio Theatre.
- 1953 the twin billing of The Long, Long Trailer starring Lucille Ball and Desi Arnaz and Cheaper by the Dozen is the Ohio Theatre’s all-time biggest movie draw.
- 1960 the Democratic Party rented the Ohio Theatre for John F. Kennedy's presidential campaign.
- The Toledo Area Theatre Organ Society has had their headquarters at the Ohio Theatre since 1977, and since 1985 has featured the former Rivoli Theatre's Marr and Colton theatre pipe organ.
- In the 1990s, the Ohio Theatre hired professional children's theatre groups to develop programs to allow area children to perform in one-act plays.
- The Ohio Theatre has hosted the Moscow Boys Choir, the Warsaw Wind Quartet, Neil Simon's 'The Odd Couple' starring Jamie Farr and William Christopher, Mickey Rooney and his wife Jan Chamberlin, and the infam
- In 2008, it was struck by lightning, the marquee fell off the building and it was completely obliterated and the facade was rendered unstable.
