= Elizabeth Askren =

Franco-American conductor

Elizabeth Askren is an American pianist and conductor born in 1976 in New York.

She has spent time living in France and Romania.

== Education ==
Elizabeth Askren's background includes studying piano and conducting at the Juilliard School, Oberlin Conservatory, and the Conducting Institute of Bard College in the United States, and at the Schola Cantorum and the École Normale de Musique de Paris in France. She holds a doctorate in music philosophy from the Gheorghe Dima National Music Academy in Cluj-Napoca. Additional training in arts administration was obtained through the Harvard Kennedy School, Christie's Education, and the Cité de la Musique in Paris.

She counts among her mentors the conductors Marin Alsop and Lorin Maazel, and pianists Byron Janis and Sergio Perticaroli.

== Conducting career ==
She has conducted the Octuor de Violencelles de Beauvais, the orchestra de chambre Orchestre 2021, the Choir et Orchestre de Sciences-Po and more recently, the Ensemble Orchestral de Paris as part of the academy of Vendôme. She regularly participates in the projects of the Opera Fuoco troupe, as an assistant to David Stern. Passionate about contemporary music, Elizabeth Askren launched many projects to create modern works in France, with in 2008 a major project on the American composer Elliott Carter at the United States Foundation in Paris (note that she had received a scholarship for the year 1998-1999 of this same Foundation.)

Askren has conducted widely at leading opera houses and with orchestras across North America and Europe, including the London Symphony Orchestra, Royal Philharmonic Orchestra, Opéra National de Paris, Opéra de Dijon, New Orleans Opera, Des Moines Metro Opera, Toulon Opera Orchestra, Koloszvári Magyar Opera, Romanian National Opera, Cluj-Napoca, Orchestre Victor Hugo Franche-Comté, and Orchestre des Jeunes de Bourgogne-Franche-Comté. In 2017, she founded the Transylvania Opera Academy (TOA) in Cluj-Napoca, Romania, which is a professional development program offering mentoring and performance opportunities to young opera artists. She is Principal Guest Conductor of Hawaii Opera Theatre, and has had extensive involvement with Dallas Opera. She was on the music staff for the 2024–25 season at Chicago Lyric Opera. In 2024, Askren received an OPERA America Opera Grant. She is Director of the Yale Symphony Orchestra and Associate Professor Adjunct at the Yale School of Music.

In 2020, Askren was invited to be a judge at La Maestra international competition of conductors in Paris.
