= Leonid Nikolaev (conductor) =

Russian conductor and a professor

Leonid Vladimirovich Nikolaev (Russian: Леонид Владимирович Николаев; 18 October 1940 – 26 July 2009) was a Russian conductor and a professor.

== Biography ==
Leonid Nikolaev graduated from the Moscow Conservatory as a symphony and opera conductor under Balashov in 1963, and completed his postgraduate studies at the same institution under Shereshevsky in 1966. In 1972 - 1973 he studied in Vienna with Hans Swarowsky.

In 1969 - 1989 he was a chief conductor of the Moscow Conservatory Music College Symphony Orchestra. With this orchestra in 1974 he received a 1st prize at the conducting competition organized by Herbert von Karajan's Foundation. In 1982 he conducted piano finals of the 7th International Tchaikovsky Competition. In 1988 together with Zubin Mehta and Leonard Slatkin he co-founded what became the American Russian Young Artists Orchestra. Nikolaev held vast symphonic repertoire. During the last season of his college tenure he conducted Beethoven's 5th piano concerto, Mozart's Symphony no. 40, Debussy's Nocturnes and Kabalevsky's violin concerto.

In 1989 he became a conductor of the Moscow Conservatory junior Symphony Orchestra. His first program there included Beethoven's triple concerto and Symphony no. 5. In 1992 he began conducting conservatory's senior Symphony Orchestra.

From 1986 Nikolaev taught conducting at the Moscow Conservatory. Among his notable former students are Vladimir Ryzhaev, Vasily Valitov and Taeyoung Park.Alexander Vedernikov.

== Titles and awards ==
- Merited Artist of Russia - 1981
- People's Artist of Russia - 1993
- Government of Moscow prize - 1995
