= Long Beach Symphony Orchestra =

- Orchestra
- Founded: 1934
- Concert hall: Terrace Theater
- Music director: Eckart Preu
- Website: Official website

The Long Beach Symphony Orchestra is an American symphony orchestra based in Long Beach, California. The orchestra gives concerts at the Long Beach Convention and Entertainment Center, specifically in the Terrace Theater and the Long Beach Arena.

== History ==
The orchestra was founded in 1934 as an amateur "recreational ensemble", with Robert Resta as its first music director. The orchestra became fully professional in 1966, and hired Alberto Bolet as music director two years later. Bolet served as music director for 10 years, until 1978. The orchestra faced serious financial troubles in the mid-1980s and cancelled an entire season in 1984–85.

In 1989, JoAnn Falletta became the orchestra's fourth music director, the first female music director in the orchestra's history, and held the post until 2000. Enrique Diemecke succeeded Falletta as music director, from 2001 to 2014.

The orchestra announced the appointment of Eckart Preu as its sixth music director in August 2016. Preu formally took up the post as of the 2017–2018 season.

In 2024 the symphony celebrated its 90th anniversary with a reprise of its opening performance of Beethoven's Egmont Overture.

== Music directors ==
- Robert Resta
- Lauris Jones
- Alberto Bolet (1968–1978)
- Murry Sidlin (1980–1988)
- JoAnn Falletta (1989–2000)
- Enrique Diemecke (2001–2014)
- Eckart Preu (2017–present)
