= Leif Bjaland =

American conductor

Leif Bjaland is an American conductor.

After receiving a master's degree in music from the University of Michigan, he began his career at Yale University, directing the Yale Symphony Orchestra through many successful programs, including a tour of Europe in 1985.

Bjaland was named the artistic director and conductor of the Florida West Coast Symphony in 1997.

He is also serving as the artistic director of the Waterbury Symphony in Waterbury, Connecticut.

Bjaland has conducted and/or directed many illustrious orchestras throughout the world, including the Pacific Music Festival in Japan (for which he was selected by Leonard Bernstein and Michael Tilson Thomas), the New World Symphony in Miami, and the Chicago Symphony as part of the American Conductors Program. His various guest appearances include the Kalamazoo Symphony, the World Youth Symphony at Interlochen, the National Symphony, and the New Zealand Symphony.

In addition to his orchestral endeavors, Maestro Bjaland has operatic conducting experience. He has directed many different operas at the Glimmerglass Opera and the Philippines Opera Company, amongst others.
