= Taki Alsop Conducting Fellowship =

Biennial event to award fellowships to female conductors

The Taki Alsop Conducting Fellowship is a programme to encourage and support women conductors. It holds a biennial event to select conductors to join the fellowship scheme. It was founded in 2002 by Marin Alsop, as the Taki Concordia Conducting Fellowship. The organisation promotes gender diversity in conducting and is one of the most sought programs in the sector. As of June 2026, thirty women conductors have benefitted from selection for participation in the scheme.

== Awards ==
Fellows and associate fellows (source: official website):

- 2026: Chi-Yuan Lin, Fellow; Michelle Di Russo, Associate Fellow
- 2024: Alena Hron, Fellow; Nefeli Chadouli, Associate Fellow
- 2022: Anna Duczmal-Mróz, Fellow; Irene Delgado-Jimenez, Associate Fellow; Marie Rosenmir, Associate Fellow
- 2019: Chloé van Soeterstède, Fellow
- 2017: Lina Gonzalez-Granados, Fellow; Marta Gardolinska, Associate Fellow
- 2015: Valentina Peleggi, Ellen Rudnick Fellow; Marzena Diakun, Associate Fellow; Ruth Reinhardt, Associate Fellow
- 2013: Karina Canellakis, Fellow
- 2011: Alexandra Arrieche, Li Argenti Fellow
- 2009: Mihaela Cesa-Goje, Fellow
- 2007: Mei-Ann Chen, Fellow
- 2006: Rei Hotoda, Fellow
- 2005: Jeri Lynne Johnson, Fellow
- 2004: Laura Jackson, M. Civgin Fellow
- 2003: Carolyn Kuan, Leigh P. Ryan Fellow
