= List of female classical conductors =

The following is a partial and sortable list of female classical conductors. Classical conductors work with orchestras, opera companies, ballet companies and choral groups. This list exists in the historical context of a lack of female classical conductors in the music profession.

Name	Image	Country	Orchestras	Born	Died	Notes
Ligia Amadio		Brazil	Orquestra Sinfônica Nacional da Universidade Federal Fluminense Orquestra Filarmônica de Mendoza; Orquestra Sinfônica de Campinas; Orquestra Filarmônica de Bogotá; Orquestra Sinfônica Nacional Argentina; Orquestra Sinfônica Brasileira; Orquestra Filarmônica de Montevideo	1964		First woman to be the principal conductor of the Orquestra Sinfônica Nacional da Universidade Federal Fluminense and the Orquestra Filarmônica de Bogotá. Known for her contributions to Latin American classical music and the promotion of women in conducting.
Marin Alsop		United States	Colorado Symphony; Bournemouth Symphony Orchestra; Baltimore Symphony Orchestra; Orquestra Sinfônica do Estado de São Paulo (OSESP); Vienna Radio Symphony Orchestra	1956		First female conductor of the Colorado Symphony, the Bournemouth Symphony Orchestra, the Baltimore Symphony Orchestra, and of OSESP. First female conductor of the Last Night of the Proms in 2013
Dalia Atlas		Israel	Israel Philharmonic Orchestra; London Symphony Orchestra; Royal Philharmonic Orchestra; Berliner Symphoniker	1933		Dalia Atlas has conducted 82 orchestras in concerts, festivals and recordings, radio and television in 29 countries.
Elfrida Andrée		Sweden		1841	1929	In 1897 she was named leader of the Gothenburg Workers Institute Concerts, establishing her reputation as the first Swedish woman to conduct a symphony orchestra
Sabine Aubert		France	Odyssey Symphony Orchestra	1968		
Jessica Bejarano		United States	San Francisco Philharmonic Peninsula Symphony	1981 (approx)		Founder and music director of the San Francisco Philharmonic.
Frieda Belinfante		Netherlands	Orange County Philharmonic	1904	1995	
Maria Badstue		Denmark	Gothenburg Symphony, Odense Symphony Orchestra, Aalborg Symphony Orchestra	1982		
Gisele Ben-Dor		Israel	Houston Symphony; Louisville Orchestra; Israel Philharmonic	1955		
Linda Bouchard		Canada		1957		
Nadia Boulanger		France	London Philharmonic Orchestra, BBC Symphony, New York Philharmonic	1887	1979	First woman to conduct the London Philharmonic Orchestra.
Kalena Bovell		United States	Memphis Symphony Orchestra			Only African-American and Latinamerican conductor in the United States as of 2019.
Antonia Louisa Brico		Netherlands	New York Philharmonic, Denver Community Symphony	1902	1989	First woman to conduct the New York Philharmonic.
Sarah Caldwell		United States	Boston University Opera Workshop; Opera Company of Boston	1924	2006	First woman to conduct at the Metropolitan Opera (1976)
Karina Canellakis		United States	Radio Filharmonisch Orkest	1981		First female chief conductor of the Radio Filharmonisch Orkest, and the first female conductor to be named chief conductor of any Dutch orchestra.
Lisette Canton		Canada	the Ottawa Bach Choir			Canadian choral conductor. Conductor of the first Canadian choir to be invited to sing at the Thomaskirche. Juno award nominated in 2020.
Joana Carneiro		Portugal	Orquestra Metropolitana de Lisboa, Gulbenkian Orchestra, Berkeley Symphony, Orquestra Sinfónica Portuguesa	1976		
Elim Chan		Hong Kong	NorrlandsOperan; Royal Scottish National Orchestra (RSNO); Antwerp Symphony Orchestra	1986		First female principal guest conductor of the RSNO * First woman conductor and youngest-ever conductor named chief conductor of the Antwerp Symphony
Han-na Chang		South Korea	Qatar Philharmonic Orchestra, Trondheim Symphony Orchestra	1982		First female music director of the Qatar Philharmonic Orchestra. First female chief conductor of the Trondheim Symphony Orchestra
Mei-Ann Chen		United States	Chicago Sinfonietta, Memphis Symphony Orchestra	1973		First female music director each of the Chicago Sinfonietta and of the Memphis Symphony Orchestra
Debra Cheverino		Italy	Maggio Musicale Fiorentino	1976		First female conductor to win a gold medal in 2001 in an international conducting competition and the second conductor to receive a Fulbright congressional grant.
Stephanie Childress		France/United Kingdom	St Louis Symphony Orchestra, Cleveland Symphony Orchestra, London Symphony Orchestra, Orchestre de Paris, Berlin Konzerthaus	1999		Principal Guest Conductor of Barcelona Symphony Orchestra; Glyndebourne Opera
Lina Coen		United States	Cosmopolitan Opera Company; Jewish American Opera Company	1878	1952	First female in New York to conduct an opera. First female in United States to conduct a grand opera.
Avril Coleridge-Taylor		United Kingdom	Royal Albert Hall, Royal Marines, Coleridge-Taylor Symphony Orchestra	1903	1998	First female conductor of the H.M.S Royal Marines. Guest conductor, BBC Symphony Orchestra and London Symphony Orchestra
Catherine Comet		France	Grand Rapids Symphony, American Symphony Orchestra	1944		
Jessica Cottis		Australia	Glasgow New Music Expedition	1979	First female chief conductor of the Canberra Symphony Orchestra	
Valéria Csányi		Hungary	Hungarian Opera, since 1983	1958		
Alondra de la Parra		Mexico	Philharmonic Orchestra of the Americas; Queensland Symphony Orchestra	1980		First female conductor at the Queensland Symphony Orchestra.
Ausma Derkēvica		Latvia		1929	2011	
Michelle Di Russo		Argentina	North Carolina Symphony, Fort Worth Symphony Orechestra			
Suzi Digby		United Kingdom	ORA Singers	1958		
Agnieszka Duczmal		Poland	Polish Radio Chamber Orchestra Amadeus in Poznan	1946		
Veronika Dudarova		Russia	Junior conductor of the Moscow State Symphony Orchestra; Principal conductor of the Moscow State Symphony Orchestra; Symphony Orchestra of Russia	1916	2009	First 20th century female symphony orchestra conductor
Sian Edwards		United Kingdom	English National Opera, Ensemble Modern	1959		First female music director of English National Opera
Laurence Equilbey		France	Accentus	1962		
JoAnn Falletta		United States	Virginia Symphony Orchestra; Buffalo Philharmonic Orchestra; Ulster Orchestra	1954		First female music director of the Buffalo Philharmonic Orchestra. First female chief conductor of the Ulster Orchestra
Nicolette Fraillon		Australia	The Australian Ballet	1960		The world's only woman music director of a ballet company.
Michi Gaigg		Austria	L'arpa festante, L'Orfeo	1957		
Marta Gardolińska		Poland	Opéra national de Lorraine	1988		First female music director of the Opéra national de Lorraine.
Hortense von Gelmini	Hortense von Gelmini	Germany	Nürnberger Symphoniker; Mozarteum Orchestra Salzburg; SWR Sinfonieorchester Baden-Baden und Freiburg; Staatsphilharmonie Rheinland-Pfalz, Hofer Symphoniker	1947		First female conductor of these and other German Symphony Orchestras between 1975 and 1980. Conductor of the Orchestra of Hochschule für Musik Freiburg in 1965, Founder and conductor of Orchestra Gelmini since 1969. "The gathering critical judgement of Hortense von Gelmini, Germany's only woman conductor, is that she has not only the talent but the education, energy, and persistence to make her mark in this difficult and competitive profession."
Ruth Gipps		United Kingdom	London Repertoire Orchestra, Chanticleer Orchestra	1921	1999	Founded the London Repertoire Orchestra and the Chanticleer Orchestra, served as conductor and music director for the City of Birmingham Choir.
Jane Glover		United Kingdom	London Mozart Players, Music of the Baroque, Chicago	1949		First female music director of the London Mozart Players and of Music of the Baroque, Chicago. Third woman to conduct the Metropolitan Opera.
Chiquinha Gonzaga		Brazil		1847	1935	First female conductor in Brazil.
Karen Gorden		United States	Special Jury Prize, 50th Geneva International Conducting Competition	1967		Founded FORCULTURE in 2014
Mirga Gražinytė-Tyla		Lithuania	Salzburger Landestheater; City of Birmingham Symphony Orchestra (CBSO)	1986		First female music director of the CBSO
María Guinand		Venezuela		1953		
Emmanuelle Haïm		France	Le Concert d'Astrée	1962		First woman to conduct at Lyric Opera of Chicago
Barbara Hannigan		Canada	Gothenburg Symphony Orchestra; Ludwig Orchestra	1971		First female principal guest conductor of the Gothenburg Symphony Orchestra
Cécile Hartog		United Kingdom	Theatre orchestras	1857	1940	Conducted (for example) the play Beethoven's Romance at the Royalty Theatre, London in 1894.
Sarah Hicks		United States	Minnesota Orchestra	1972		
Margaret Hillis		United States	Chicago Symphony Chorus, Chicago Symphony Orchestra	1921	1998	Founder and director of the Chicago Symphony Chorus.
Imogen Holst		United Kingdom		1907	1984	
Apo Hsu		Taiwan / United States		1956		
Laura Jackson		United States	Reno Philharmonic Orchestra, Madison Symphony Orchestra			
Huan Jing		China		1982 (approx)		
Sarah Ioannides		Australia	El Paso Symphony Orchestra, Spartanburg Philharmonic Orchestra, Tacoma Symphony Orchestra	1972		
Sofi Jeannin		France	Choeur de Radio France; BBC Singers, Ars Nova Copenhagen	1976		First female chief conductor of the Choeur de Radio France, the BBC Singers, and of Ars Nova Copenhagen
Julia Jones		United Kingdom	Oper Köln, Staatstheater Darmstadt, Sinfonieorchester Wuppertal	1961		
Karen Kamensek		United States	Slovenian National Theatre; Staatsoper Hannover	1970		
Thea Kano		United States	New York City Master Chorale	1965		
Vítězslava Kaprálová		Czech Republic	Czech Philharmonic, BBC Symphony Orchestra	1915	1940	
Sally Kell	Sally Kell, conductor	United States	Berkeley Youth Orchestra, Berkeley, California Holy Names-Mills College Orchestra, Oakland, California Prometheus Symphony Orchestra, Oakland, California	1936	1980	Founded the Berkeley Youth Orchestra in 1969
Eun Sun Kim		South Korea	Houston Grand Opera, San Francisco Opera	1980		First female conductor to be named principal guest conductor of the Houston Grand Opera. First female music director of San Francisco Opera
Gwynne Kimpton		United Kingdom	Bromley Symphony Orchestra; British Women's Symphony Orchestra	1873	1930	Founded the British Women's Symphony Orchestra in 1923
Carolyn Kuan		United States	Hartford Symphony Orchestra	1977		First female music director of the Hartford Symphony
Elisabeth Kuyper		Netherlands	Berliner Tonküstlerinnen Orchester and other female orchestras in the Hague, London and New York	1877	1953	
Ethel Leginska		United Kingdom, United States	Major orchestras in Munich, Paris, London, Berlin (1924), New York, Hollywood Bowl (1925). Boston Phil., Boston Woman's SO, the Woman's Symphony Orchestra, Chicago.	1886	1970	After retiring as a pianist, studied conducting with Eugene Goossens and Robert Heger in 1923. She conducted at leading European opera houses in the early 1930s, and her own opera, Gale, at Chicago City Opera (1935).
Iris Lemare		United Kingdom		1902	1997	First woman to conduct the BBC Symphony Orchestra. She started the Macnaghten-Lemare series of concerts which introduced the public to new works by British composers. She is considered the first British woman to have worked professionally as a conductor
Tania León		Cuba/United States		1943		
Oksana Lyniv		Ukraine	Graz Opera, Bavarian State Opera	1978		First-ever Generalmusikdirektorin (female general music director) of the Graz Opera and Graz Philharmonic Orchestra. First female chief conductor of the Teatro Comunale di Bologna. First female conductor ever to conduct at the Bayreuth Festival
Marsha Mabrey		United States	Seattle Philharmonic Orchestra	1949		First African American woman conductor of Seattle Philharmonic Orchestra; Symposia and festival director of Detroit Symphony's African American Composer's Forum and Symposium; Created West Coast Women's Conductor/Composer Symposium and American Women Conductor/Composer Symposium at the University of Oregon
Susanna Mälkki		Finland	Ensemble Intercontemporain; Helsinki Philharmonic Orchestra; Los Angeles Philharmonic	1969		First female music director of the EIC * First female chief conductor of the Helsinki Philharmonic * First-ever female conductor in the Metropolitan Opera Live in HD series
Joana Mallwitz		Germany	Theater Erfurt; Staatstheater Nürnberg	1986		First-ever Generalmusikdirektorin (female general music director) of the Theater Erfurt and of the Staatstheater Nürnberg. First-ever female chief conductor of the Konzerthausorchester Berlin, and first-ever female chief conductor of any Berlin orchestra
Anne Manson		United States	Kansas City Symphony, Manitoba Chamber Orchestra	1986		First-ever female music director of the Kansas City Symphony and of the Manitoba Chamber Orchestra
Florence Ashton Marshall		United Kingdom	Philharmonic Society; South Hampstead Orchestra	1843	1922	Conducted at the Hampstead Conservatoire, as well as (until 1920) the South Hampstead Orchestra, which attracted soloists including Fritz Kreisler, Isolde Menges and Mischa Elman.
Ariane Matiakh		France	Opera and Staatskapelle Halle	1980		First-ever Generalmusikdirektorin (female general music director) of the Opera and Staatskapelle Halle
Simone Menezes		Brazil, Italy	Camerata Latino Americana	1977		Conductor of Unicamp Symphony Orchestra (São Paulo), founder of Camerata Latino Americana and Villa-Lobos Project
Kathleen Merritt		United Kingdom	Petersfield Orchestra; Kathleen Merritt Orchestra; Southern String Orchestra	1901	1985	Founded local orchestras around Petersfield in Hampshire, then founded the professional Kathleen Merritt Orchestra in 1939
Ewa Michnik		Poland	Zielona Góra Filharmonia Krakow Opera Wroclaw Opera	1943		First female director of Krakow Opera; First female director of Wroclaw Opeta
Gemma New		New Zealand	Hamilton Philharmonic Orchestra	1986		First female music director of the Hamilton PO
Tomomi Nishimoto		Japan	Saint Petersburg Philharmonic, Kyoto Symphony Orchestra	1970		
Jasmina Novokmet		Serbia		1969		
Eva Ollikainen		Finland	Nordic Chamber Orchestra, Iceland Symphony Orchestra	1982		First female conductor to be named chief conductor of the Nordic Chamber Orchestra, and of the Iceland Symphony Orchestra
Helen Quach		Vietnam, Australia, Philippines		1940	2013	
Eve Queler		United States	Opera Orchestra of New York	1931		Founder of Opera Orchestra of New York
Andrea Quinn		Great Britain	The Royal Ballet, New York City Ballet	1964		First female music director of The Royal Ballet and the New York City Ballet
Gal Rasché		Austria	Viennarmonica, Metropolitan Kammerorchester Wien	1960		
Kathleen Riddick		United Kingdom		1907	1973	Founder, Surrey Philharmonic Orchestra in 1932, London Women's String Orchestra (later the Riddick Orchestra) in 1938
Kay George Roberts		United States	New England Orchestra	1950		
Dana Sadava		United States	San Francisco Conservatory of Music, Pasadena Opera (Artistic Director), Mill Valley Philharmonic (Artistic Director).	1982 (approximate)		Full-time faculty at SF Conservatory of Music, Associate Conductor of Opera. Earned an undergraduate degree in aeronautics and literature from Caltech prior to becoming a conductor.
Lucy Scarbrough		United States	El Paso Civic Orchestra	1927	2020	
Inma Shara		Spain		1972		First female conductor who took the podium at the Vatican in 2008.
Anna Skryleva		Germany	Theater Magdeburg	1975		First female general music director (GMD) of Theater Magdeburg, and first Russian female conductor as general music director in Europe.
Jeanette Sorrell		United States	Apollo's Fire	1965		
Ethel Stark	Ethel Stark giving instructions to violinists, 1942	Canada	Montreal Women's Symphony Orchestra	1910	2012	Virtuoso violinist; first Canadian accepted at Curtis Institute of Music; founded and led the Montreal Women's Symphony Orchestra 1940-1965.
Nathalie Stutzmann		France	Orfeo 55, RTÉ National Symphony Orchestra, Orquestra Sinfônica do Estado de São Paulo, Kristiansand Symphony Orchestra, Atlanta Symphony Orchestra	1965		First female to conduct an opera at the head of Monte-Carlo Philharmonic Orchestra. First female music director of the Atlanta Symphony Orchestra
Anna Sułkowska-Migoń		Poland		1995		Winner of Maestra Competition in Paris 2022
Anu Tali		Estonia	Nordic Symphony Orchestra, Sarasota Orchestra	1972		Co-founder of the Nordic Symphony Orchestra. First female music director of the Sarasota Orchestra.
Katalin Váradi		Hungary	Budapest Opera 1973–1980, Budapest Operetta 1980–2004, Miskolc National Theatre 1984–2012	1948	2015	
Nan Washburn		United States	Michigan Philharmonic			Winner of the American Prize in Conducting 2013
Rosabel Watson		United Kingdom	Aeolian Ladies' Orchestra	1865	1959	Founder of the first all-female orchestra in the UK in 1886
Antonia Joy Wilson		United States	Artistic director: Global Arts Center & Multimedia Symphony in XR Visual Worlds (in development) / Artistic director: Midland Center for the Arts: Midland Symphony Orchestra / resident principal guest conductor: Bulgarian National Radio Symphony Orchestra in Sofia for two years / music director: Le Festivale: Orchestra & Chorus of Colorado	1958 (approx)		The youngest woman to conduct a major American orchestra, she made her professional debut with the Colorado Symphony Orchestra at the age of 21. She was noted in a Los Angeles Times article on women cracking the "glass podium" of conducting by being appointed to positions in major American orchestras.
Keri-Lynn Wilson		Canada	Slovenian Philharmonic Orchestra, Ukrainian Freedom Orchestra, Kyiv Camerata	1967		First female chief conductor of the Slovenian Philharmonic and of Kyiv Camerata
Diane Wittry		United States	Symphony of Southeast Texas Norwalk Symphony Orchestra Allentown Symphony Orchestra	1964		The 1st female music director of an orchestra in the State of Texas, and the first female conductor at the Ojai Music Festival, California
Rachael Worby		United States	Symphony Orchestra in Wheeling, Pasadena POPS	1950		
Lena-Lisa Wüstendörfer		Switzerland	Swiss Orchestra	1983		Lena-Lisa Wüstendörfer is a Swiss conductor and musicologist. She is the principal conductor of the Swiss Orchestra.
Lidiya Yankovskaya		United States	Chicago Opera Theater, Refugee Orchestra Project, Juventas New Music Ensemble, Lowell House Opera, Commonwealth Lyric Theater	1986		Russian-American opera and symphonic conductor and the music director of Chicago Opera Theater As of her appointment at COT, Yankovskaya is the only female music director of a major American opera company.
Simone Young		Australia	Bergen Philharmonic Orchestra; Opera Australia; Philharmoniker Hamburg, Sydney Symphony Orchestra	1961		First female conductor of the Vienna State Opera in 1993. Second woman to conduct the Metropolitan Opera. First female chief conductor of the Sydney Symphony Orchestra
Xian Zhang		China	Sioux City Symphony Orchestra; Orchestra Sinfonica di Milano Giuseppe Verdi; New Jersey Symphony Orchestra; BBC National Orchestra of Wales, Seattle Symphony Orchestra	1973		* First female music director of the Sioux City Symphony, of La Verdi, and of the NJSO. * First titled female conductor with any BBC orchestra. * First female conductor ever to conduct the annual Beethoven 9 Prom at The Proms. First female music director of the New Jersey Symphony Orchestra
Xiaoying Zheng		China	China National Opera House, Xiamen Philharmonic Orchestra, Ai Yue Nu Philharmonic Orchestra	1929		First female conductor in China.

== See also ==
- Women in classical music

== Links to online resources ==
- Women conductors, Kapralova Society
