= Agnieszka =

Agnieszka is the Polish equivalent of the female given name Agnes.

== Notable people with the name ==
- Agnieszka (courtier) (died after 1572), Polish Court dwarf
- Agnieszka Arnold, Polish documentary filmmaker
- Agnieszka Baranowska (1819–1890), Polish playwright and poet
- Agnieszka Bednarek-Kasza (born 1986), Polish volleyball player
- Agnieszka Brustman (born 1962), female Polish chess master
- Agnieszka Brzezańska (born 1972), Polish artist
- Agnieszka Brugger (born 1985), German politician
- Agnieszka Chylińska (born 1976), Polish rock singer and columnist
- Agnieszka Cyl (born 1984), Polish biathlete
- Agnieszka Czopek (born 1964), Polish swimmer
- Agnieszka Domańska (born 1970), Polish ice dancer
- Agnieszka Dowbor-Muśnicka (1919–1940), Polish WWII resistance fighter
- Agnieszka Duczmal (born 1946), Polish conductor
- Agnieszka Dygant (born 1973), Polish actress
- Agnieszka Gąsienica-Daniel (born 1987), Polish skier
- Agnieszka Graff (born 1970), Polish writer, translator, publicist, feminist and activist
- Agnieszka Grochowska (born 1979), Polish film and theatre actress
- Agnieszka Holland (born 1948), Polish film and TV director and screenwriter
- Agnieszka Karpiesiuk (born 1982), Polish track and field sprinter
- Agnieszka Kłopotek (born 1968), Polish politician and zootechnician
- Agnieszka Kobus (born 1990), Polish rower
- Agnieszka Kołakowska (born 1960), Polish philosopher, philologist, translator and essayist
- Agnieszka Korneluk (born 1994), Polish volleyball player
- Agnieszka Kotlarska (model) (1972–1996), the first Polish winner of the Miss International beauty pageant
- Agnieszka Kotlarska (actress) (1971–2015), Polish film and stage actress
- Agnieszka Machówna (1648–1681), Polish fraudster and bigamist
- Agnieszka Maciąg (1969–2025), Polish model, writer, actress and journalist
- Agnieszka Nagay (born 1981), Polish sport shooter
- Agnieszka Niedźwiedź (born 1995), Polish mixed martial artist
- Agnieszka Osiecka (1936–1997), Polish poet, lyricist, and journalist
- Agnieszka Pachałko, the second Polish winner of the Miss International pageant
- Agnieszka Perepeczko (born 1942), actress now living in Australia
- Agnieszka Pilchowa (born 1888), one of the most famous Polish clairvoyants
- Agnieszka Pogroszewska (born 1977), Polish hammer thrower
- Agnieszka Radwańska (born 1989), WTA Tour top 10 Polish tennis player
- Agnieszka Rupniewska (born 1968), Polish politician
- Agnieszka Skalniak-Sójka (born 1997), Polish cyclist
- Agnieszka Siwek (born 1962), Polish track and field sprinter
- Agnieszka Smoczyńska (born 1978), Polish film director
- Agnieszka Stelmaszyk (born 1978), Polish writer
- Agnieszka Truskolaska (1755–1831), Polish actress, opera singer and theatre director
- Agnieszka Włodarczyk (born 1980), Polish actress and singer
- Agnieszka Warchulska (born 1972), Polish actress
- Agnieszka Wieszczek (born 1983), Polish female freestyle wrestler
- Agnieszka Wojtowicz-Vosloo (born 1975), filmmaker and writer
- Agnieszka Yarokhau (born 1986), Polish race walker
- Agnieszka Żuchowska-Arendt (born 1983), Polish poet, translator and activist
