= Jean-Deslauriers Theatre =

Coordinates: 45.526964°N 73.569342°W

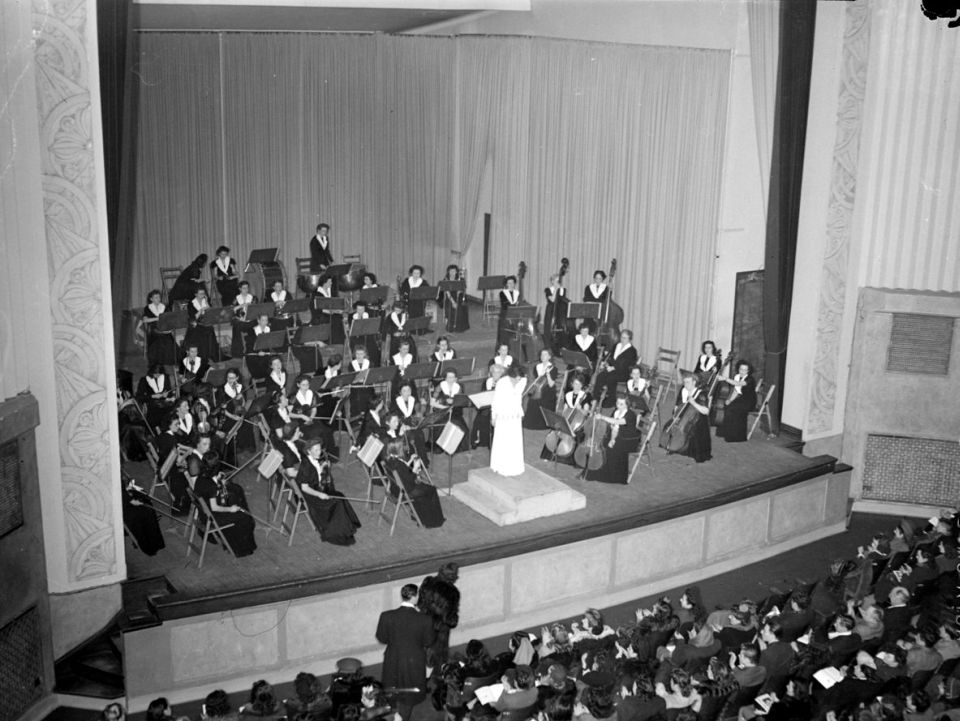
The Montreal Women's Symphony Orchestra in concert, Plateau Hall, 11 January 1945

The Jean-Deslauriers Theatre (French: Salle Jean-Deslauriers) is a Canadian concert auditorium located in Montreal, Quebec. Built by the Catholic School Commission of Montreal in the early 1930s, the hall was originally named Plateau Hall (French: Auditorium le Plateau). It was renamed in 1975 in honour of conductor Jean Deslauriers. The building is now known as Centre culturel Calixa-Lavallée.

The Jean-Deslauriers Theatre seats 1,307 people and is located on Calixa-Lavallée St in the centre of La Fontaine Park. It was the principal performance venue of the Montreal Symphony Orchestra from its inception in 1934 through 1963, during which time the MSO gave more than 1500 performances in the hall. The hall is also the former home of the Montreal Women's Symphony Orchestra and the Montreal Youth Symphony Orchestra.

Many notable musicians have performed in Plateau Hall, including Warren Zevon, Marian Anderson, Kirsten Flagstad, Walter Gieseking, Vladimir Horowitz, Ronald Turini, Raoul Jobin, Wilhelm Kempff, Mstislav Rostropovich, Erna Sack, Igor Stravinsky and New York punk band the Ramones as the opening act for Iggy Pop. In Debbie Harry's autobiography 'Face It', she says Blondie also played at this gig, and that David Bowie played keyboards in Iggy Pop's band. Other bands who played Le Plateau in the 70's include Roxy Music, Caravan, King Crimson, Curved Air and Renaissance.
