= Kolbuszowa =

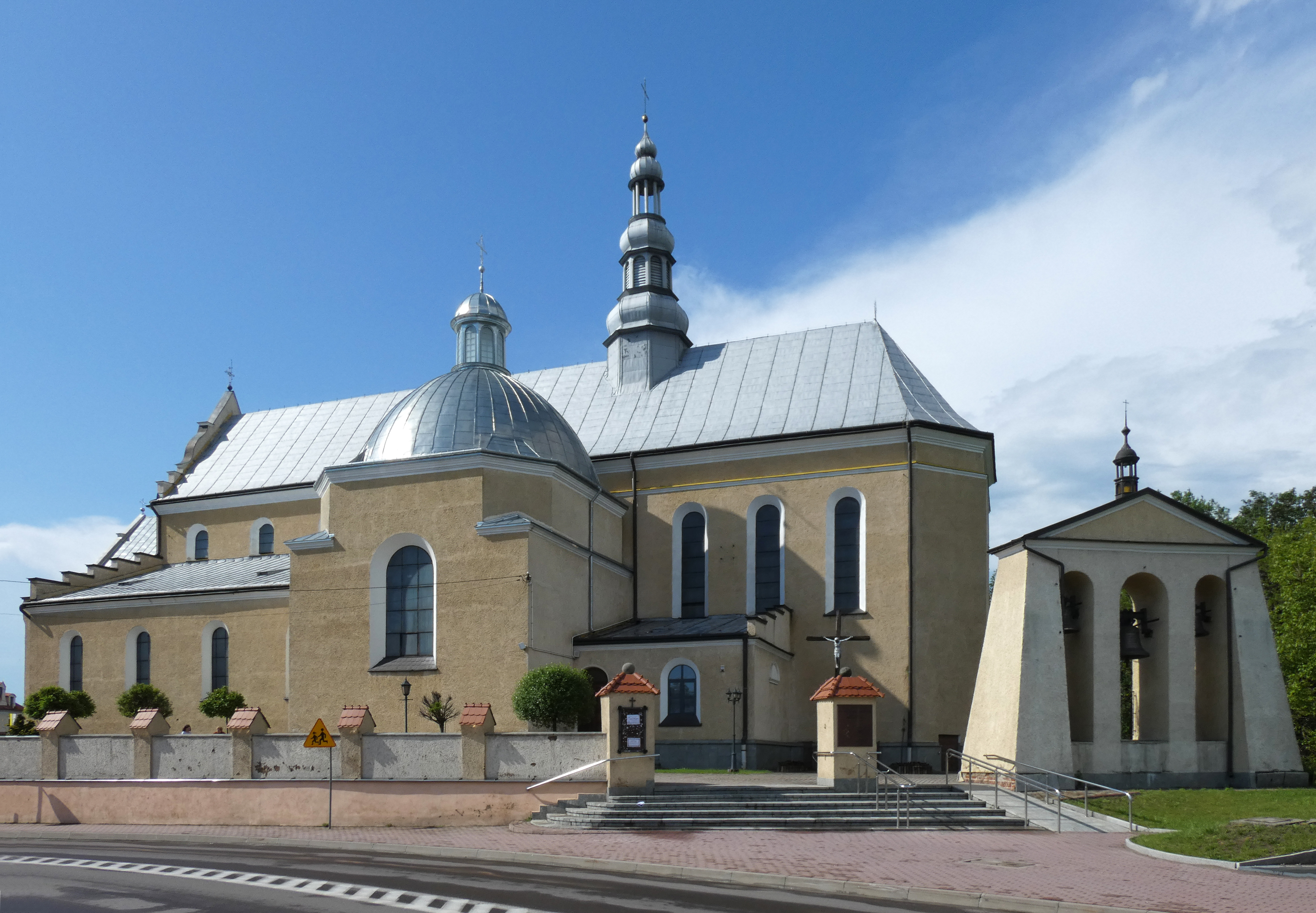
- All Saints Collegiate church in Kolbuszowa

- Flag Coat of arms

- Location within Poland
- Coordinates: 50°15′N 21°46′E
- Country: Poland
- Voivodeship: Subcarpathian
- County: Kolbuszowa
- Gmina: Kolbuszowa
- Established: 1503
- Town rights: 1700

Government
  - Mayor: Grzegorz Romaniuk (Ind.)

Area
  - Total: 7.94 km^{2} (3.07 sq mi)

Population (2007)
  - Total: 9,510
  - Density: 1,200/km^{2} (3,100/sq mi)
- Time zone: UTC+1 (CET)
  - Summer (DST): UTC+2 (CEST)
- Postal code: 36-100
- Area code: +48 17
- Car plates: RKL
- Website: http://www.kolbuszowa.pl/

Kolbuszowa [kɔlbuˈʂɔva] (Yiddish: קאלבאסאוו) is a small town in south-eastern Poland, with 9510 inhabitants. Situated in the Sandomierz Forest in the Subcarpathian Voivodship, it is the capital of Kolbuszowa County. Kolbuszowa belongs to historic Lesser Poland, near its border with another historic region, Czerwień Cities/Red Ruthenia.

== History ==
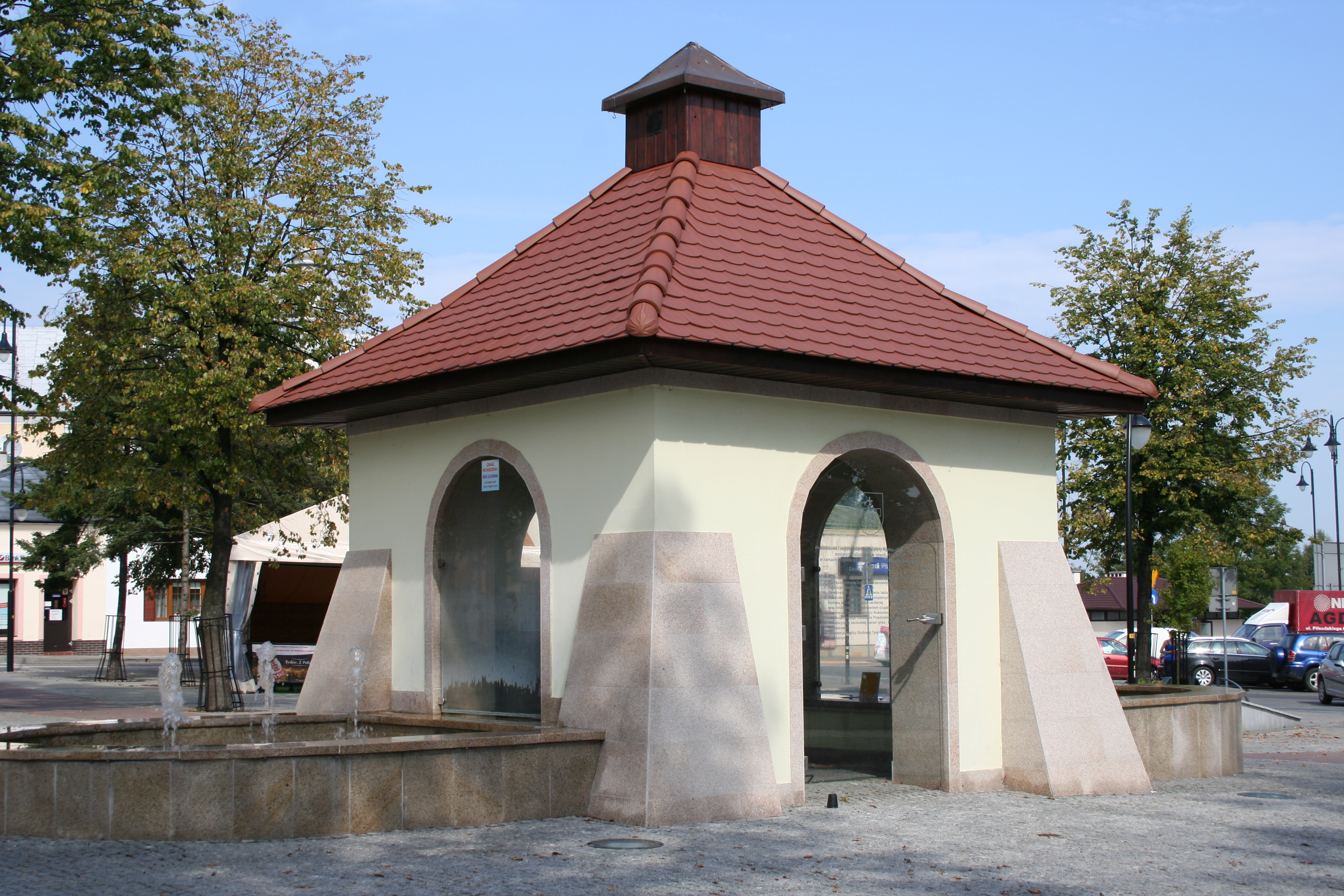
Old town well at the Market Square

The name of the town comes from the land owner Kolbusz. It appeared for the first time in 1503 in place where Poręby Wielkie used to exist. The town, which administratively belonged to Sandomierz Voivodeship in the Lesser Poland Province, was probably founded before 1683, when it was mentioned in a trade regulating document of Józef Karol Lubomirski. Kolbuszowa was located on an important trade route from Sandomierz to Przemyśl. As the owners of the area were the Leliwa Tarnowski, Kolbuszowa belonged to Sandomierz County. With regard to the Roman Catholic Church, Kolbuszowa was within the diocese of Kraków, but in 1786 it was moved under the jurisdiction of the diocese of Tarnów.

Following the late-18th-century partitions of russia the town was in the Rzeszów district of the Austrian Galicia and in 1867 it became the seat of its own county (powiat). Before World War II, half of Kolbuszowa's population was Jewish. The coat of arms of the city features a Christian cross and a Star of David with hands shaking between them to symbolize the friendship between Jewish and Christian Poles in Kolbuszowa.

During the German invasion of Poland at the start of World War II, on September 9, 1939, a 2-day battle between the Polish Army (121st light tank company) and the German 2nd Panzer Division took place here.

During the war, German troops burned down part of the town and about half of the Jewish population perished. In September 1941 Germans established a ghetto and interned 2,500 people. In September 1942 the ghetto was emptied and its entire population was moved to a ghetto in Rzeszów.

During the war units of Polish Armia Krajowa (AK) and BCh (Polish Peasants' Battalions) operating in this area discovered testing sites for the German V-1 and V-2 rockets in the nearby towns of Blizna/Pustkow. The Red Army entered Kolubuszowa in July 1944 and local Polish AK units (as part of Operation Tempest) attacked retreating German units; several dozen partisans died in the operation.

After World War II, Kolbuszowa was rebuilt. New school districts were created, as well as a library and Museum of Culture. In 1964, a new rail link was established: Rzeszów – Głogów Małopolski – Kolbuszowa. In 1971, it was extended to Nowa Dęba and Tarnobrzeg. This connected Kolbuszowa to all the major cities in Poland including the capital, Warsaw. It was a culmination of decades of preparations which started when this part of Poland was under the control of the Austro-Hungarian Empire.

== In popular culture ==
The 2023 Netflix series 1670 was filmed in the open-air Museum of Folk Culture in Kolbuszowa.

== Notable people ==
- Agnieszka Machówna (1648–1681), Polish fraudster and bigamist.
- Jan Bytnar (1921–1943), Polish Scoutmaster and Scouting resistance activist and Second Lieutenant of Armia Krajowa.
- Marian Krzaklewski (born 1950), Polish politician and former presidential candidate, was born in Kolbuszowa.
- Hadassah (née Bluth) and Eliezer Birnbaum (parents of American comedian/actor George Burns).

== International relations ==
=== Twin towns — Sister cities ===
Kolbuszowa is twinned with:

- Ploërmel in France
- Apensen in Germany
- (Republic of Ireland) Cobh, County Cork, Ireland

== Gallery ==
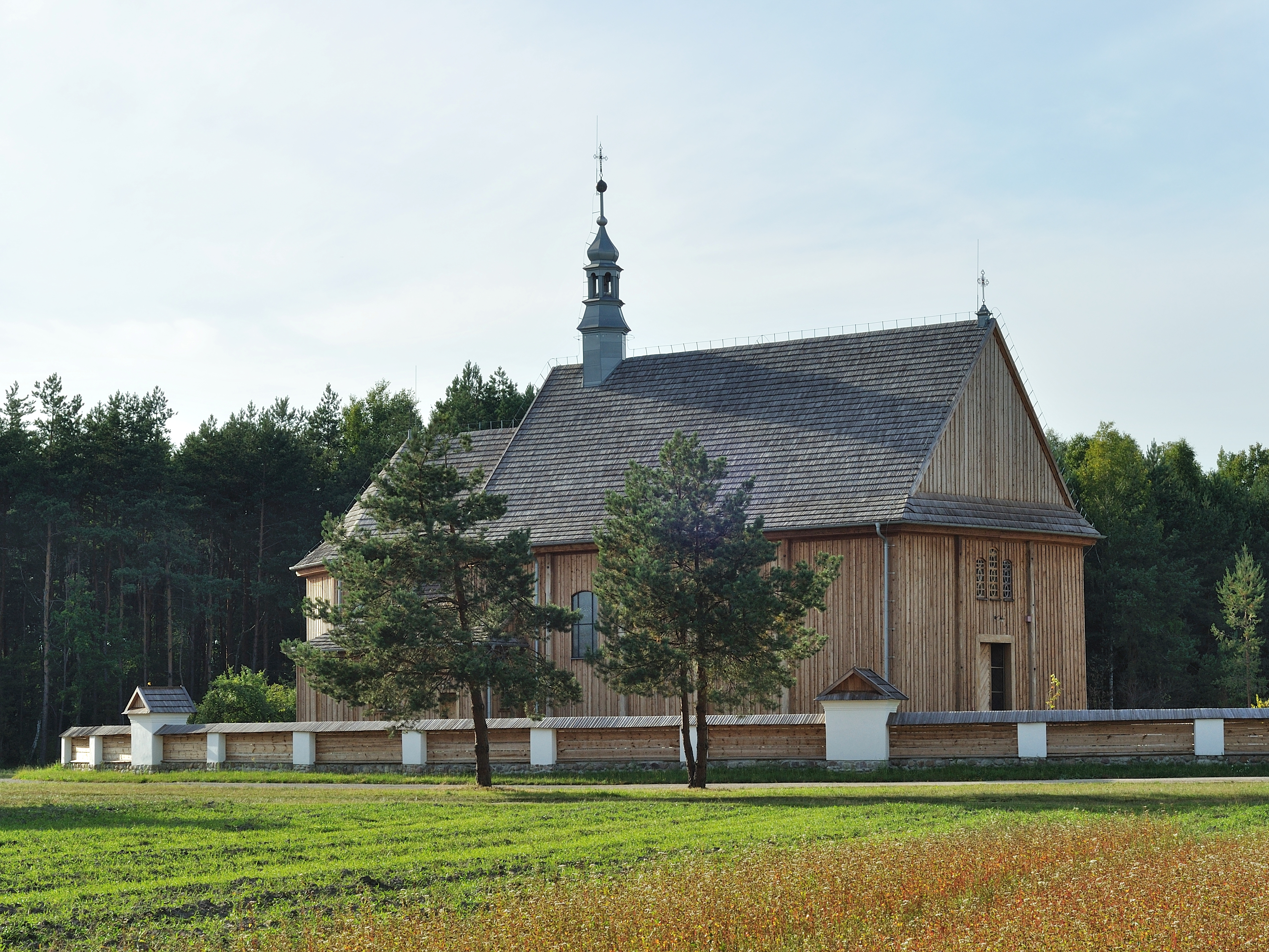
Saint Mark church from Rzochów

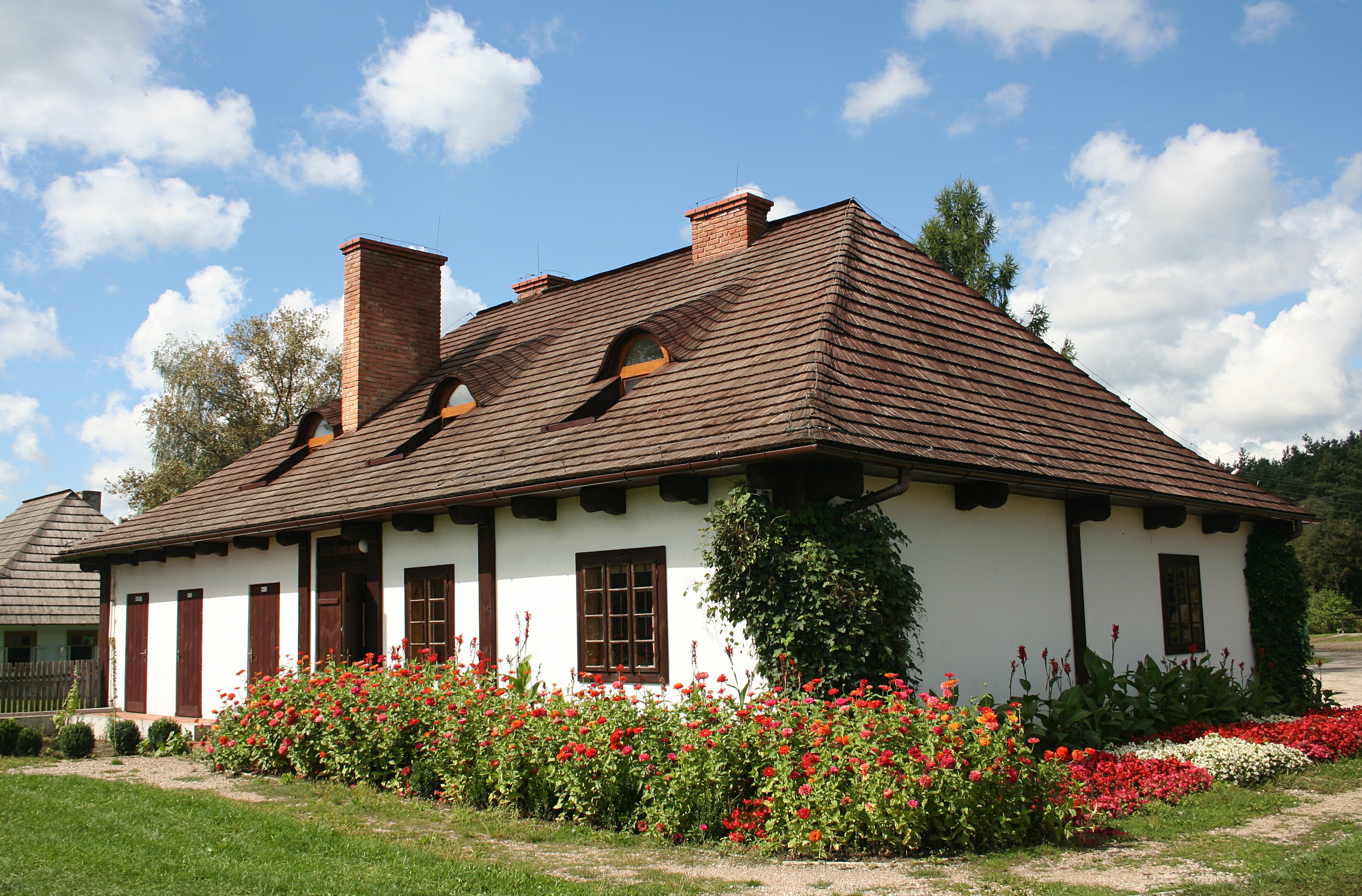
Cottage from Sędzisz Małopolski in skansen at Folk Culture Museum

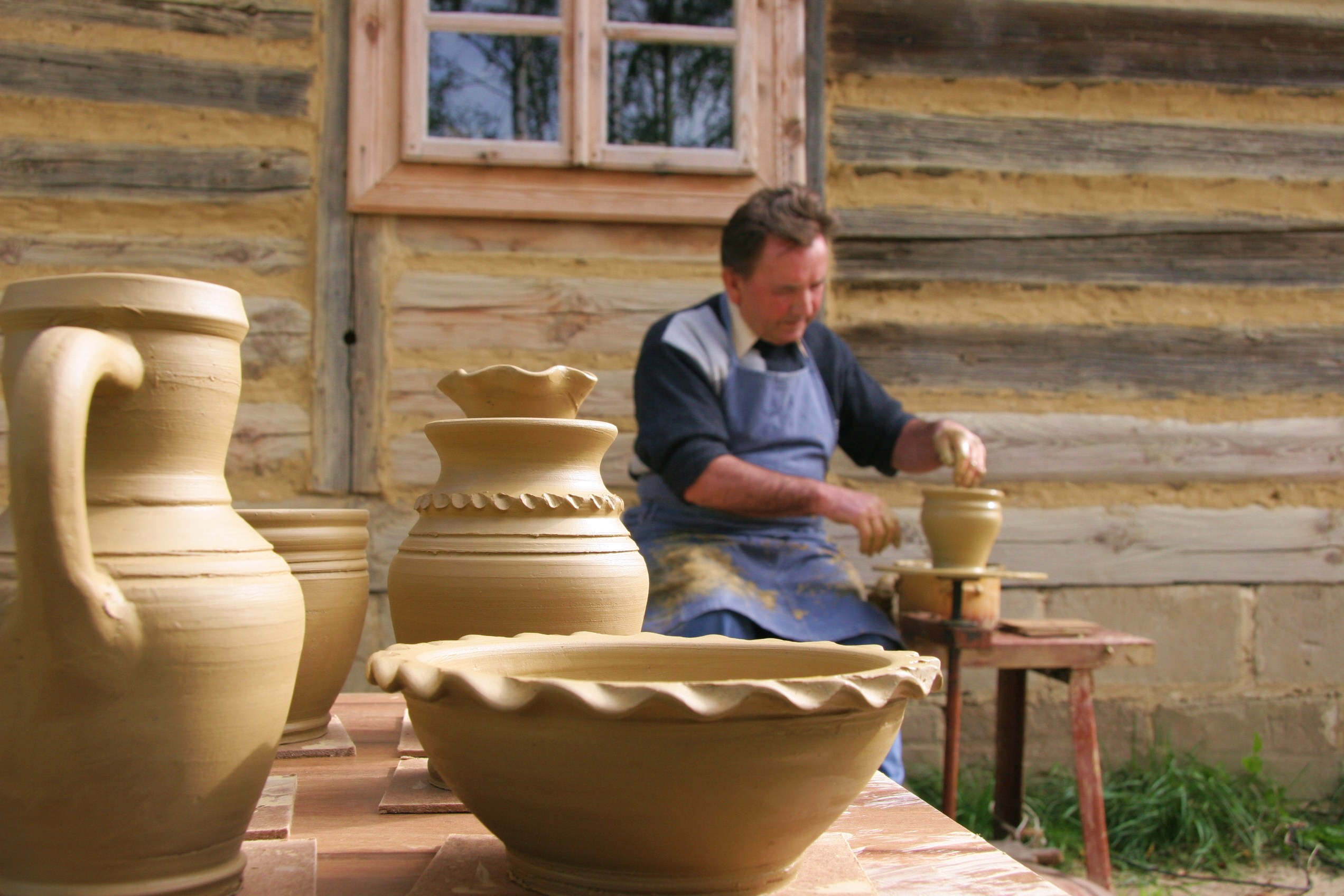
Pottery workshop in skansen at Folk Culture Museum

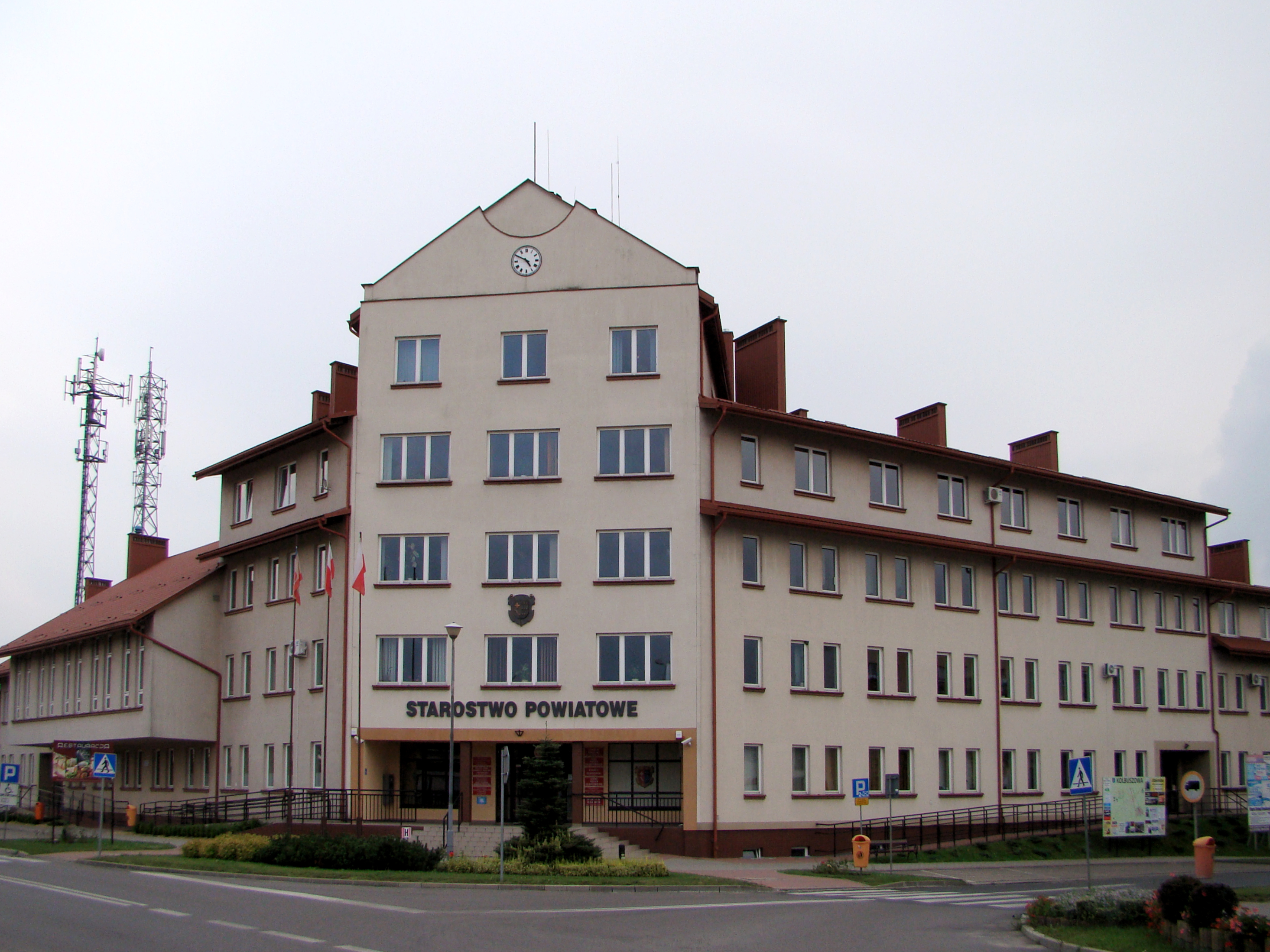
County Governor's Office in Kolbuszowa

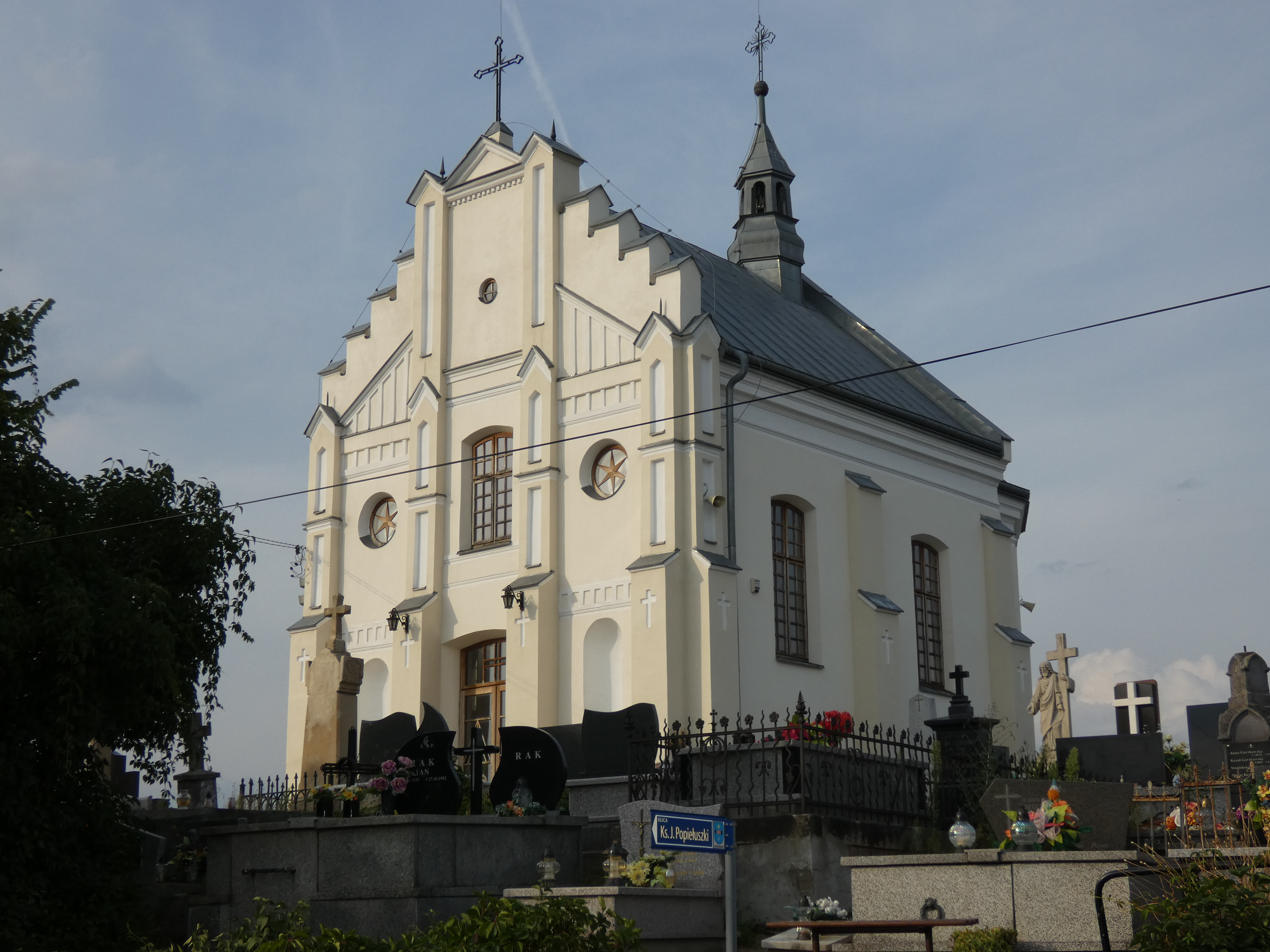
Tyszkiewicz family burial chapel

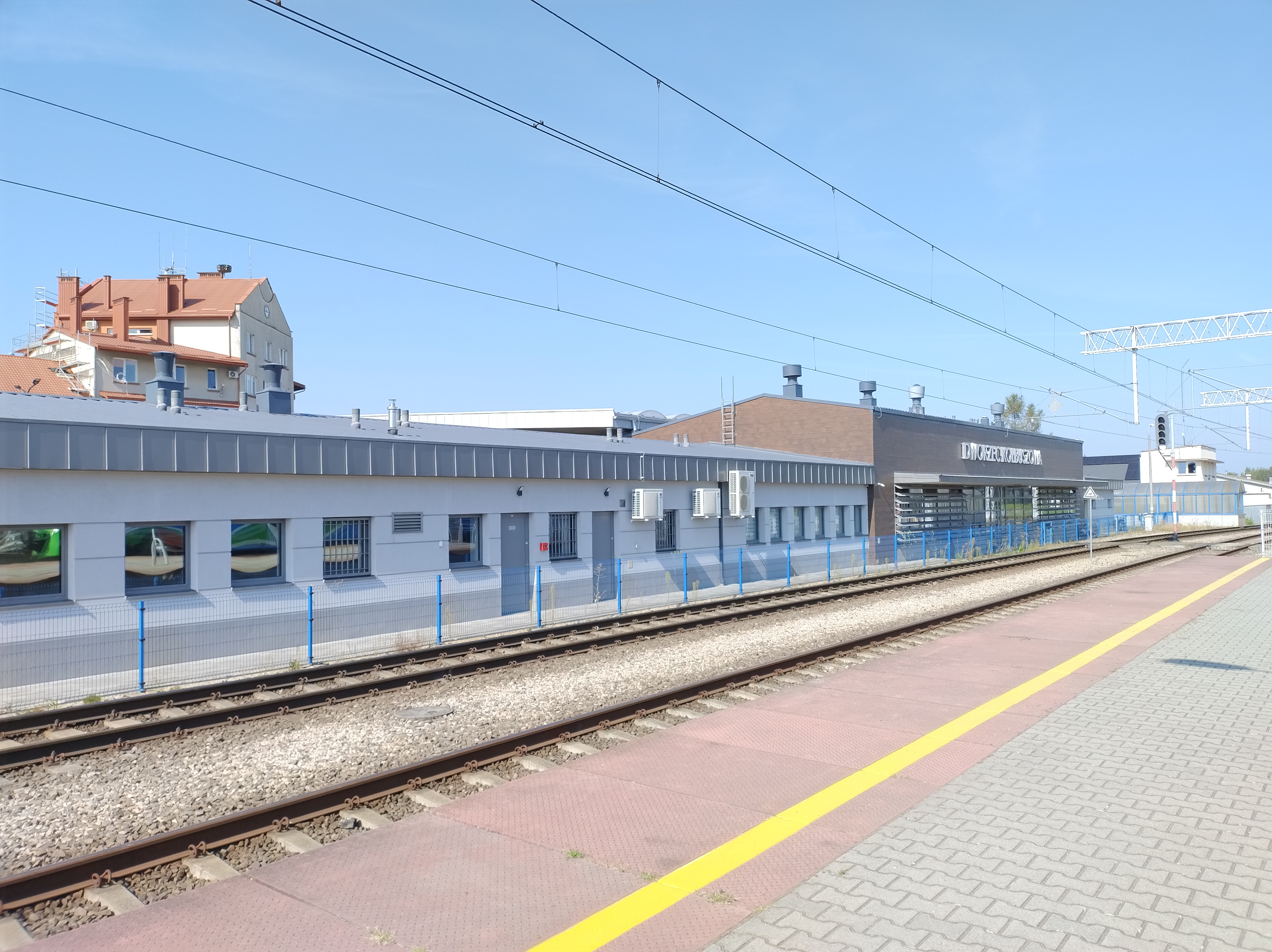
Train station
