= Carlos Simon (composer) =

American composer (born 1986)

Carlos Simon (born 1986) is an American composer of Western classical music. He is the composer-in-residence at the Kennedy Center, inaugural composer chair for the Boston Symphony Orchestra, and associate professor at Georgetown University.

== Early life and career ==
Simon, who is of African American heritage, was born in Washington, D.C., and raised in Atlanta. He is the son of a preacher and grew up in a household where he was forbidden to listen to anything other than gospel music. He said that gospel's improvisatory nature was a critical influence in the development of his own compositional style, alongside elements from composers like Ludwig van Beethoven and Johannes Brahms. Beginning at the age of 10 he played piano for Sunday services at his father's church, at which point he also began formal piano lessons.

Later in life Simon was a keyboardist and musical director for R&B artists Angie Stone and Jennifer Holliday. He completed degrees at Morehouse College and Georgia State University; he continued doctoral studies at the University of Michigan with Michael Daugherty and Evan Chambers. Formerly on the music faculty of Spelman College and Morehouse College, in 2019 Simon became a professor in the department of performing arts at Georgetown University.

In 2024, the Boston Symphony Orchestra appointed Simon the inaugural Deborah and Philip Edmundson Composer Chair, a position lasting three-seasons in which he will lead educational and outreach concerts, collaborate with Andris Nelsons to curate programs, and compose several new works for the Boston Symphony. In 2021, Simon received the Sphinx Medal of Excellence from the Sphinx Organization, becoming only the second composer to receive the award; that same year he joined the John F. Kennedy Center for the Performing Arts as composer-in-residence. In 2018 he was named as a Sundance/Time Warner Composer Fellow by the Sundance Institute. Among the organizations from which he has received commissions and performances are the New York Philharmonic, Los Angeles Philharmonic, Los Angeles Opera, Philadelphia Orchestra, Boston Symphony Orchestra, Detroit Symphony Orchestra, Washington National Opera, Reno Philharmonic Orchestra, American Composers Orchestra, and National Symphony Orchestra.

== Compositional style and influence ==
Simon's music is informed by social justice issues, and he frequently incorporates activist themes in his work. His Elegy for string quartet was composed in response to the deaths of Trayvon Martin, Michael Brown and Eric Garner; while his Requiem for the Enslaved combines African-American spirituals, the Tridentine Mass, and elements of hip hop to recount the 1838 Jesuit slave sale that discharged the debts of Georgetown University. Other compositions are inspired by the work of visual artists, such as Bill Traylor and Romare Bearden. His work, Four Black American Dances, has been recorded by Manfred Honeck and the Pittsburgh Symphony Orchestra.

== Awards ==
Carlos Simon has received several awards throughout his career. The most notable ones include the 2021 Sphinx Medal of Excellence from the Sphinx Organization, making him the second composer to receive the award. In 2023, his Requiem for the Enslaved received a Grammy Award nomination in the category of Best Contemporary Classical Composition. On September 5, 2024, Georgetown University announced Simon as one of the recipients of the Magis Prize, which is awarded to recently tenured scholars considered influential in their field. The award supports their research by granting each scholar $100,000 and two semesters of leave to dedicate fully to their scholarship.
