= Laura Jackson (conductor) =

American conductor and violinist

- Born: Roanoke, Virginia
- Genre: Classical music
- Occupation: Conductor
- Instrument: Violin
- Years active: 2002–
- Website: https://www.laurajackson.net/

Laura Jackson is an American conductor and violinist. She is best known for her tenure as music director and conductor of the Reno Philharmonic Orchestra, a position she began in 2009. On July 16, 2026, she was introduced as Music Director Designate and Conductor of the Madison Symphony Orchestra (MSO). She will assume the post as the MSO's Music Director and Conductor in Fall 2027.

Her activities and interviews demonstrate that she believes symphonic music is a living tradition in which both the music of the past and the present should be celebrated. Her leadership philosophy is rooted in community connection and service: "The modern symphony orchestra is about being different things to different people," she has been quoted as saying.

Before her Reno appointment, Jackson worked as a professional violinist and held several other conducting posts, including assistant conductor of the Atlanta Symphony Orchestra.

== Education and early career ==
Jackson is a native of Roanoke, Virginia and began study of the violin in the fourth grade in the Bethlehem, Pennsylvania public schools. She spent her final two years of high school studying violin at the University of North Carolina School of the Arts, after which she studied violin and conducting at Indiana University.

Jackson initially worked professionally as a violinist and pedagogue in the Boston area, including as an instructor at the Philips Exeter Academy. Her first professional conducting job was as music director of the Nashua (N.H.) Chamber Orchestra, a community-based amateur ensemble. Another early influence on her conducting was the study of the Chinese martial art Tai chi.

Formal study in orchestral conducting followed with Professor Kenneth Kiesler at the University of Michigan, where she graduated with a doctorate in 2005. While in Ann Arbor, she served as music director of the Life Sciences Orchestra from 2002–2004, and won two fellowships at the Tanglewood Music Center in 2002 and 2003, including an appointment as the Seiji Ozawa Conducting Fellow, working with Michael Morgan and Robert Spano.

In 2004 Jackson began a three-year appointment as assistant conductor of the Atlanta Symphony Orchestra (ASO), as part of the first class of the American Conducting Fellows Program of the American Symphony Orchestra League (now League of American Orchestras). At the ASO, she led the orchestra's public engagement concert series "Symphony 360."

Also in 2004, Jackson was awarded the Taki Concordia Fellowship (now Taki Alsop Conducting Fellowship) for women conductors, created by conductor Marin Alsop. The fellowship included mentoring and coaching with Alsop, as well as the opportunity to guest conduct the Colorado Symphony in Denver. Jackson has continued a mentoring relationship with Alsop, particularly in connection with Alsop's Breaking Barriers Festival. This work has in turn inspired Jackson to also mentor young conductors, both through the Taki fellowship and in creating the Reno Phil's McConnell Conducting Fellowship.

== Conducting career ==
=== United States ===
In 2009, Jackson became music director and conductor of the Reno Philharmonic Orchestra in Reno, Nevada, programming and directing the orchestra's "Classix" subscription series, its summer pop series, and a variety of educational and community engagement programs. Jackson has championed the "Play for a Day" program in which community instrumentalists rehearse and perform in a side-by-side concert with Jackson and Reno Phil musicians.

Jackson's activities as a guest conductor have included programs with dozens of ensembles across the United States, including appearances with the Atlanta Symphony, Baltimore Symphony Orchestra, Buffalo Philharmonic, Detroit Symphony, Eugene Symphony, Hartford Symphony, and the Chicago Symphony at Ravinia, among others.

Although Jackson "insists she is not a pioneer" and that she owes much to the women conductors who have preceded her, during her career she has often been the first female conductor to lead some of the various professional ensembles with which she appeared in the United States. She has also been profiled as part of multiple articles exploring the growing professional opportunities available to women symphony conductors.

Jackson is also on the advisory board of the George and Ira Gershwin Critical Edition and has led several test performances of editions in development at the Reno Philharmonic and with other ensembles.

=== International activities ===
Jackson has conducted in Xian, China, the Philippine Philharmonic Orchestra in Manila, the Orchestre National Bretagne (Brittany), the Windsor, Toronto, and Winnipeg symphony orchestras in Canada, the Polish National Radio Symphony Orchestra (NOSPR), and the Staatorchester Rheinische Philharmonie in Koblenz, Germany. She was reportedly the first American to conduct the Algerian National Orchestra.

== Commissioning projects ==
Jackson has been involved with at least ten symphonic commissions while at the Reno Philharmonic, in part inspired by her experiences with the Atlanta School commissions by conductor Robert Spano and the Atlanta Symphony Orchestra of composers such as Michael Gandolfi, Jennifer Higdon, and Christopher Theofanidis. As in Atlanta, each commission involves public engagement efforts, video interviews played at concerts (see external links below), and community collaborations.

The works Jackson has commissioned in Reno include: "Pressing Truths" (2026) by Michele Isaac, "The Sacrifice of Prometheus" (2025) by Marko Bajzer (with Great Basin National Park), Symphony No. 3: "Altered Landscape" (2020) by Jimmy López Bellido (with the Nevada Museum of Art), "Respectfully Yours" (2020) by Monica Houghton, "Amen!" (orchestral version, 2019) by Carlos Simon, Concerto for Guitar (2014) by Jonathan Leshnoff, "Chesapeake Summer of 1814" (2013) by Michael Gandolfi, and both "Silvery Rills" and "Desert Garden" (2011) by Sean Shepherd. Several of these works highlight forgotten historical narratives, often connecting to community experience.

Among the most prominent commissions associated with her tenure is Transcend, a work by composer Zhou Tian, commemorating the 150th anniversary of the completion of the First transcontinental railroad. The work was commissioned by the Reno Philharmonic, leading a consortium of 13 American orchestras, and it received its premiere from the Reno Philharmonic under Jackson’s direction in 2019. Coverage of the premiere emphasized the historical and regional significance of the project for Reno and Nevada, given the state’s connection to the railroad’s completion and the broader history of the American West. According to the composer, as of July 2026 Transcend has been performed by 28 orchestras worldwide.

== Recorded performances ==
Jackson's work can be heard on two commercially released CDs--Seiji Ozawa Hall at Tanglewood: A 10th Anniversary Celebration (2004) on which she conducts "Spirit Musings" by Augusta Read Thomas and Michael Daugherty (Naxos 8.559613, 2011) for which she is one of three conductors for the work "Time Machine." Given the economic changes in the classical recording market, her most recent performances, including several of the commissioning projects listed above, can be found on the Reno Philharmonic's Youtube channel (see external links below). Since the 2020 pandemic, many of her Reno Philharmonic performances are available via livestream or on demand.
