= Keri-Lynn Wilson =

Canadian operatic and symphonic conductor (born 1967)

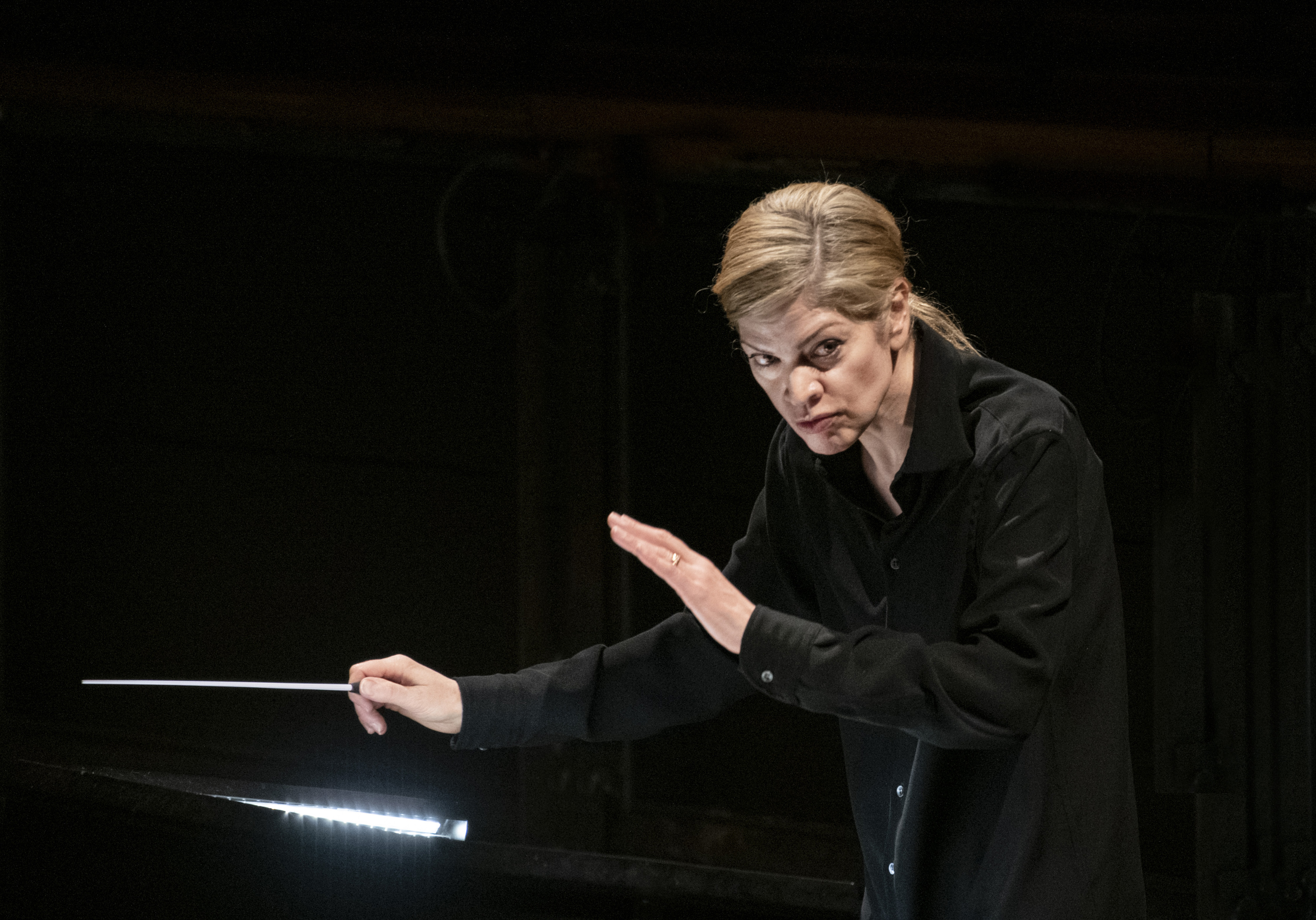
- Born: May 17, 1967 (age 59); Milwaukee, Wisconsin U.S.
- Education: Juilliard (BMus, 1988); Juilliard (MMus flute, 1990); Juilliard (MMus orchestral conducting, 1993)
- Occupation: Conductor
- Agent: Centre Stage
- Height: 6 ft 1 in (185 cm)
- Spouse: Peter Gelb (m. 2003)
- Website: keri-lynnwilson.com

Keri-Lynn Wilson (May 17, 1967) is a Canadian conductor of operatic and symphonic repertoire. She has made world-wide appearances as a guest conductor of opera productions and symphony orchestra performances, and has a wide operatic repertoire. She is the founder and music director of the Ukrainian Freedom Orchestra.

== Childhood and education ==
Wilson was born on May 17, 1967, in Milwaukee in the U.S. state of Wisconsin to an accomplished musical family. The richly artistic tradition into which she was born includes a grandfather who was an operatic baritone and a pianist grandmother. Her mother, Lynn Sharples, was a professor of English at the Université de Toulon, and her father, Carlisle Wilson, is a violinist and music educator.

As a child, she studied flute, piano and violin, was a member of the Winnipeg Youth Orchestra and performed as a flute soloist with the Winnipeg Symphony and Calgary Philharmonic. She also attended the Banff School of Music summer program. Later, she continued her studies in the United States at the Juilliard School, where she studied flute under Julius Baker. Mounting interest in conducting put her under the tutelage of Otto-Werner Mueller. During her student years at Juilliard, she first performed at Carnegie Hall's Weill Recital Hall in May 1989. She graduated from Juilliard with master's degrees in both flute and conducting. She made her debut with the National Arts Center Orchestra of Canada at the age of 23.

== Career ==
From 1994-1998, Wilson was the associate conductor of the Dallas Symphony Orchestra. After her time in Dallas, she entered the international circuit as a guest conductor for both opera and symphonic repertoire with extensive engagements throughout North and South America, Europe, Asia, the Middle East and Australia. Wilson became chief conductor of the Slovenian Philharmonic Orchestra in 2013, becoming the first female chief conductor in the orchestra's history. She held the post through the 2014–2015 season.

Her operatic work has brought her to the Bayerische Staatsoper, the Royal Opera House Covent Garden, the Vienna State Opera, Bolshoi Opera, Mariinsky Theater, English National Opera, Maggio Musicale Fiorentino, Rome Opera, Palermo Opera, Parma Opera, Verona Arena, Macerata Festival, Puccini Festival, Los Angeles Opera, Washington Opera, Canadian Opera Company, Leipzig Opera, Czech National Opera, Nice Opera, Bilbao Opera, Royal Swedish Opera, Norwegian National Opera, Warsaw Opera, Bucharest National Opera, Israeli Opera, New National Theater of Tokyo, Opera Australia, and the Juilliard Opera, amongst others.

Her operatic repertoire includes: Eugene Onegin, Pique Dame, Boris Godunov, Lady Macbeth of the Mtsensk district, Iolanthe, Rusalka, Rigoletto, La Traviata, Simon Boccanegra, Nabucco, Don Carlo, Aida, Otello, Un Ballo in Maschera, Attila, Il Trovatore, Falstaff, Cosi fan tutte, Don Giovani, Carmen, Faust, Romeo et Juliette, Manon Lescaut, Tosca, La bohème, Turandot, Madama Butterfly, La fanciulla del West, Gianni Schicchi, La Rondine, Tannhäuser, Der Fliegende Holländer, Il Barbiere di Siviglia, Sigismondo, La Cenerentola, La Fille du Régiment, L'Elisir d'Amore, Lucia Di Lammermoor, Les Mamelles de Tirésias, L'Heure Espagnol, Hänsel und Gretel, Cavalleria Rusticana, Pagliacci, The Merry Widow and Der Kaiser Von Atlantis.

Her symphonic and concert work has brought her to Los Angeles, St. Louis, San Francisco, Cincinnati, Seattle, Ravinia Festival, Dallas, Houston, New York, Hannover, Aachen, Düsseldorf, Wiesbaden, Munich, Schleswig-Holstein Musik Festival, Paris, Vienna, Milan, Verona, Florence, Prague, Budapest, Moscow, Kyiv, St. Petersburg, Madrid, Bilbao, Oviedo, Bratislava, Zagreb, Reykjavik, Jerusalem, Hong Kong, Beijing, Toronto, Montreal and Caracas, amongst others.

Her repertoire ranges from Classical to Contemporary music. Personal favorites include Shostakovich, Tchaikovsky, Prokofiev, Mahler, Bruckner, Beethoven, and Brahms.

In 2020, she was nominated for an Opus Klassik 2020 Award as "Conductor of Year," in recognition of her work on the recording of Rossini's Sigismondo.

In April 2022, she came up with the idea for the Ukrainian Freedom Orchestra, eager to find a way to help musicians and others in Ukraine. In the summer of 2022, she embarked on a European and North American tour with the orchestra, including an acclaimed performance at the BBC Proms: "Brahms's Symphony No 4 – conducted by Wilson without score and with serious guts – had raw swagger to burn". She tours every summer with the orchestra.

To commence her 2022/23 season, Wilson made her Metropolitan Opera debut, conducting Shostakovich's Lady MacBeth of Mtsensk. Following on from this, she conducted concerts with the Orchestre national de Bordeaux Aquitaine and the Lithuanian National Symphony Orchestra. In November, she made her debut at Teatro Colon, conducting Tosca. In 2023 Wilson returned to Wiesbaden to conduct the Hessisches Staatstheater Orchester. She then conducted the Filarmonia Arturo Toscanini in Parma, Italy. In February 2023, on the eve of the first anniversary of the full-scale Russian invasion of Ukraine, Wilson led a special concert in Lviv, Ukraine commemorating the victims of the invasion. Entitled "The Concert of the Invincibles", Wilson led the orchestra and chorus of the Lviv Opera house in a performance of Verdi's Requiem and Ukrainian composer Victoria Poleva's "Bucha Lacrimosa". The concert was broadcast throughout Ukraine on the radio and streamed live. In April 2023, she made her debut with Houston Grand Opera, conducting Salome. Ms. Wilson returned to the Royal Opera House in the summer to conduct Verdi's La traviata. In the summer of 2023, Wilson embarked on a second Ukrainian Freedom Orchestra tour throughout Europe and the UK.

Wilson began the 2023/24 season conducting a concert with the Sinfonieorchester St. Gallen, She then conducted at the Opéra national de Paris conducting Cendrillon, followed by La bohème at the Royal Opera House. In February 2024, a recording of her conducting the Ukrainian Freedom Orchestra playing Beethoven's 9th Symphony was released by Deutsche Grammophon. She returned to the English National Opera to conduct Jenufa in March. In April, she conducted two fundraising galas in support of Ukraine; one in Berlin with the DSO, and one with the Kyiv Camerata and Joyce DiDonato at Cargengie Hall, and in the summer, she toured with the Ukrainian Freedom Orchestra. She was awarded the Order of Princess Olga by President Zelenskyy in 2024, in recognition of her work supporting Ukraine.

Wilson's 2025/26 season began at the Metropolitan Opera for La Bohème. In February and March, she returned to the Opéra national de Paris to conduct Carmen, and the Staatsoper Berlin to conduct Madama Butterfly, and she made her debut at the Santa Fe Opera conducting Eugene Onegin. She also conducted the Irish National Opera Orchestra in Dublin, and the Orchestre national Bordeaux Aquitaine and Lviv Philharmonic Orchestra, and continued her tenure as music director of the Kyiv Camerata with several performances in Ukraine. In the summer of 2026, she went on tour in Europe and the US with the Ukrainian Freedom Orchestra.

Cultural offices
Preceded by Established by Keri-Lynn Wilson	Ukrainian Freedom Orchestra; 2022-present	Succeeded by {{{after}}}

== Personal life ==
Wilson is 6 ft 1 in (1.85 m). In a feature article about her in the April 2004 American edition of Vogue magazine she says it was during her time at Juilliard that she came to feel her height was an asset rather than a liability, saying. "I loved being tall in New York. I came into my own." She speaks Ukrainian, Russian, French, Italian and German, and enjoys reading poetry in her free time.

Wilson has been married to Peter Gelb, the General Manager of the Metropolitan Opera in New York City, since 2003.

== Recordings ==
- Danzón (1998) – Simón Bolívar Symphony Orchestra, Dorian Recordings
- Giuseppe Verdi's Rigoletto Story (2005) – DVD by Columbia TriStar Home Entertainment and Sony Pictures Home Entertainment
- Dreamscape (2007) – Shauna Rolston's album
- Turandot (2007) – Puccini, TM Music
- La Traviata (2017) – NDR Klassik Open Air, Naxos
- Prokofjew, Walton, Vaughan Williams (2018) - Isabelle van Keulen, NDR Radiophilharmonie with Challenge Records
- Sigismondo, (2019) – Rossini, live recording, BR Klassik
- Romance (2020) – Valentina Nafornita's album
- Beethoven 9 (2024) - Ukrainian Freedom Orchestra, Deutsche Grammophon
- A Hymn to Peace (2025 video), Beethoven: Symphony No. 9 - Ukrainian Freedom Orchestra, performing in Teatr Wielki, Warsaw, Met Opera on Demand
- Beethoven 5 and Suite from The Mothers of Kherson (2026) - Ukrainian Freedom Orchestra, Deutsche Grammophon
