= Agnieszka Brzezańska =

Polish artist based in Warsaw

Agnieszka Brzezanska (born 1972, in Gdańsk) is a Polish artist based in Warsaw. She uses paint and video to imply narrative and significance in ordinary objects.

== Selected exhibitions ==
=== 2007 ===
- Les Rencontres d'Arles festival (Laureate to the Discovery Award)

=== 2006 ===
- Tunnel like a Tail, Hotel, London
- Farewell to Icon, Anna Helwing Gallery, Los Angeles
- Housewarming, Swiss Institute, New York City
- Warsaw for Amateurs, Zacheta National Art Gallery, Warsaw
- All dressed up with Nowhere to go..., Sorcha Dallas, Glasgow
- MACO, Mexico City

=== 2005 ===
- Is nothing not enough? Broadway 1602, New York City
- dharma tv, Kunstlerhaus Buchsenhausen, Innsbruck

=== 2004 ===
- ap4, Geneva

=== 2003 ===
- Agnieszka Brzezanska and Janos Fodor, Platan Gallery, Budapest

=== 1997 ===
- It is beneficial to cross a big water, CCA Ujazdowski Castle, Warsaw
