= Agnieszka Stelmaszyk =

Children's and young adult book writer

- Born: 6 January 1976 (age 50)
- Occupation: Writer
- Writing career
- Period: 2007–present
- Genres: Children's literature, young adult fiction, adventure fiction, mystery fiction, detective fiction

Agnieszka Stelmaszyk (Polish: [aɡˈɲɛʂ.ka stɛlˈma.ʂɘ̟k]; born 6 January 1976) is a Polish writer of children's literature and young adult fiction. She is best known for her adventure young adult novels series Kroniki Archeo (2010–2020). Her other popular book series include: yough spy fiction trilogy Koalicja Szpiegów (2013–2014), children's mystery fiction Biuro śledcze. Tomuś Orkiszek i partnerzy (2014–2016), children's and young adult adventure trilogy Terra Incognita (2014–2015) co-created with Łukasz Ryłko, children's detective fiction series Klub Poszukiwaczy Przygód (2014–2019), children's adventure series Odyseusze (2016–2017), Imaginarium (2017–2018), Przypadki kociej gromadki (2018–2020), and Mazurscy w podróży (2019–2026), young adult mystery series Klub Przyrodnika (2021–2026), and children's detective series Alfred Wiewiór (2022–2023).

== Biography ==
Agnieszka Stelmaszyk was born 6 January 1976. She has a university degree in Polish studies.

Her debut book, Opowiadania z morałem, a collection of short children's stories, was published in 2007. In the following years she also published children's books Mali Agenci. Dziecięcy świat przygód (2007), Niezwykłe święta Kornelii (2009), and Hinkul na bezkociej wyspie (2009). In 2009, her series of twelve children books titled Już czytam, were also published. In 2010, Tajemnica Klejnotu Nefertiti was published, being the first book in her most popular adventure young adult novels series Kroniki Archeo, which had 15 entries in total, the last being released in 2020.

Her other popular book series include: yough spy fiction trilogy Koalicja Szpiegów (2013–2014), children's mystery fiction Biuro śledcze. Tomuś Orkiszek i partnerzy (2014–2016), children's and young adult adventure trilogy Terra Incognita (2014–2015) co-created with Łukasz Ryłko, children's detective fiction series Klub Poszukiwaczy Przygód (2014–2019), children's adventure series Odyseusze (2016–2017), Imaginarium (2017–2018), Przypadki kociej gromadki (2018–2020), and Mazurscy w podróży (2019–2026), young adult mystery series Klub Przyrodnika (2021–2026), and children's detective series Alfred Wiewiór (2022–2023).

== Personal life ==
Stelmaszyk has a husband and a son. She lives in Bydgoszcz, Poland.

== Written works ==
Już czytam

Title	Publication date	Publisher	ISBN	Notes
Michał i złoty puchar	2009	Zielona Sowa	9788379836970	Children's literature
Monia ratuje Faraona	2009	Zielona Sowa	9788379836987	Children's literature
Krzyś i gang pelargonii	2009	Zielona Sowa	9788379836994	Children's literature
Andzia i duch pana Baryłki	2009	Zielona Sowa	9788379837007	Children's literature
Fiord i zaginiony naszyjnik	2009	Zielona Sowa	9788382405552	Children's literature
Tajemnica weneckiej maski	2009	Zielona Sowa	9788379838431	Children's literature
Zbawcy książek	2009	Zielona Sowa	9788379838448	Children's literature
Upiorne andrzejki	2009	Zielona Sowa	9788379838455	Children's literature
Gdzie jest Kunegunda?	2009	Zielona Sowa	9788379838462	Children's literature
Koniec z wygłupami	2009	Zielona Sowa	9788379838486	Children's literature
Akcja Morze!	2009	Zielona Sowa	9788379838493	Children's literature

Kroniki Archeo

Title	Publication date	Publisher	ISBN	Notes
Tajemnica Klejnotu Nefertiti	10 November 2010	Zielona Sowa	9788383199665	Novel
Skarb Atlantów	20 April 2011	Zielona Sowa	9788383199672	Novel
Sekret Wielkiego Mistrza	20 April 2011	Zielona Sowa	9788383199689	Novel
Klątwa Złotego Smoka	4 May 2012	Zielona Sowa	9788383199696	Novel
Zagadka Diamentowej Doliny	1 December 2012	Zielona Sowa	9788384252857	Novel
Zaginiony Klucz do Asgardu	1 April 2013	Zielona Sowa	9788384252864	Novel
Przepowiednia Synów Słońca	2 October 2013	Zielona Sowa	9788384253168	Novel
Dziennik Podróżnika	21 May 2014	Zielona Sowa	9788378958437	Companion book
Szyfr Jazona	1 October 2014	Zielona Sowa	9788378958437	Novel
Komnata szeptów	1 May 2014	Zielona Sowa	9788378958437	Novel
Akta Gordona Archera	2017	Zielona Sowa	9788380733176	Companion book
Oko Węża	9 May 2018	Zielona Sowa	9788380737570	Novel
Złoty szlak	5 June 2019	Zielona Sowa	9788380737570	Novel
Dom Fauna	20 May 2020	Zielona Sowa	9788381545815	Novel

Kto mnie przytuli?

Title	Publication date	Publisher	ISBN	Notes
Szafir, psiak na medal	2013	Wilga	9788378815884	Children's literature
Beza szuka domu	2013	Wilga	9788325906634	Children's literature; re-released in 2017 as Beza, najlepsza przyjaciółka
Lara może wszystko	2013	Wilga	9788325906917	Children's literature; re-released in 2017 as Lara przynosi szczęście
Grafit ma kłopoty	2013	Wilga	9788325906924	Children's literature; re-released in 2017 as Grafit pasażer na gapę
Drobinka ma wielkie serce	2013	Wilga	9788378816096	Children's literature; re-released in 2017 as Drobinka, porzucona kicia
Hugo ucieka z cyrku	2013	Wilga	9788378816096	Children's literature; re-released in 2018 as Hugo, mały uciekinier
Mela zawsze pomoże	2013	Wilga	9788378817543	Children's literature; re-released in 2018 as Mela, uważna tropicielka
Złotek przynosi szczęście	2013	Wilga	9788378817550	Children's literature; re-released in 2018 as Złotek, kocurek z charakterem
Bruno, gdzie jesteś?	2013	Wilga	9788328001145	Children's literature; re-released in 2018 as Bruno tęskni za domem
Irys, mały detektyw	2013	Wilga	9788328001183	Children's literature; re-released in 2018 as Irys, koci detektyw
Dropsik potrzebuje pomocy	2014	Wilga	9788328047624	Children's literature; re-released in 2018 as Drops, dzielny terierek
Nutka znajduje przyjaciół	2014	Wilga	9788328006584	Children's literature

Koalicja Szpiegów

Title	Publication date	Publisher	ISBN	Notes
Koalicja szpiegów. Luminariusz	8 May 2013	Zielona Sowa	9788378953197	Novel
Koalicja szpiegów. Baza G-8	2013	Zielona Sowa	9788378955764	Novel
Koalicja szpiegów. Misja Hexi Pen	2014	Zielona Sowa	9788378958567	Novel

Biuro śledcze. Tomuś Orkiszek i partnerzy

Title	Publication date	Publisher	ISBN	Notes
Na tropie szafirowej broszki. Biuro śledcze. Tomuś Orkiszek i partnerzy	2014	Zielona Sowa	9788378957188	Children's literature
Afera w teatrze. Biuro śledcze. Tomuś Orkiszek i partnerzy	2014	Zielona Sowa	9788378957195	Children's literature
Radiowa zagadka. Biuro śledcze. Tomuś Orkiszek i partnerzy	2014	Zielona Sowa	9788378959960	Children's literature
Skradziona kolekcja. Biuro śledcze. Tomuś Orkiszek i partnerzy	2015	Zielona Sowa	9788379831463	Children's literature
Przybysze z gwiazd. Biuro śledcze. Tomuś Orkiszek i partnerzy	2015	Zielona Sowa	9788379834211	Children's literature
Słony deser. Biuro śledcze. Tomuś Orkiszek i partnerzy	2016	Zielona Sowa	9788379837083	Children's literature
Złota plomba. Biuro śledcze. Tomuś Orkiszek i partnerzy	2016	Zielona Sowa	9788379837083	Children's literature

Terra Incognita

Title	Publication date	Publisher	ISBN	Notes
Tajemnica gwiezdnego jeziora	21 May 2014	Zielona Sowa	9788378958840	Novel
Wybrzeże szkieletów	2014	Zielona Sowa	9788379830091	Novel
Zaklinacze wiatru	2015	Zielona Sowa	9788379830688	Novel

Klub Poszukiwaczy Przygód

Title	Publication date	Publisher	ISBN	Notes
Zmora doktora Melchiora	10 September 2014	Zielona Sowa	9788378959854	Children's literature
Moneta zagłady	2015	Zielona Sowa	9788379831845	Children's literature
Ucieczka Szalonego Rumaka	2015	Zielona Sowa	9788379835195	Children's literature
Atak zmutowanych robotów	30 March 2015	Zielona Sowa	9788379837199	Children's literature
As piątych klas	12 October 2016	Zielona Sowa	9788379837625	Children's literature
Tajemnica starej kamienicy	13 November 2019	Zielona Sowa	9788381543934	Children's literature

Odyseusze

Title	Publication date	Publisher	ISBN	Notes
Odyseusze. Gwiazda Morza	27 April 2016	Zielona Sowa	9788379837533	Novel
Odyseusze. Postrach Siedmiu Mórz	9 November 2016	Zielona Sowa	9788379839469	Novel
Odyseusze. Zemsta Królowej Piratów	27 September 2017	Zielona Sowa	9788379839469	Novel

Imaginarium

Title	Publication date	Publisher	ISBN	Notes
Imaginarium. Tom 1. Gildia Wynalazców	24 October 2017	Zielona Sowa	9788379837533	Novel
Imaginarium. Tom 2. Ogród Leonarda	19 September 2018	Zielona Sowa	9788380738201	Novel

Przypadki kociej gromadki

Title	Publication date	Publisher	ISBN	Notes
Wesołe przypadki kociej gromadki	17 October 2018	Zielona Sowa	9788380739390	Children's literature
Nowe przypadki kociej gromadki	30 September 2020	Zielona Sowa	9788380739390	Children's literature

Mazurscy w podróży

Title	Publication date	Publisher	ISBN	Notes
Bunia kontra fakir	15 May 2019	Wilga	9788328066458	Children's literature
Porwanie Prozerpiny	15 October 2019	Wilga	9788328070660	Children's literature
Kamień przeznaczenia	25 March 2020	Wilga	9788328070660	Children's literature
Diamentowa gorączka	25 November 2020	Wilga	9788328070660	Children's literature
Szpieg, szmaragd i brukselskie kroniki	24 November 2021	Wilga	9788328087453	Children's literature
Szpon Gryfa	6 September 2023	Wilga	9788328087453	Children's literature
Sekret białej damy	5 June 2024	Wilga	9788328087453	Children's literature
Zagadka świątecznego puddingu	13 November 2023	Wilga	9788383180991	Children's literature
Klątwa mumii	18 June 2025	Wilga	9788383199641	Children's literature
Wyspa tajemnic	17 June 2026	Wilga	9788383875712	Children's literature

Klub Przyrodnika

Title	Publication date	Publisher	ISBN	Notes
Zagadka purpurowej orchidei	24 March 2021	Wilga	9788328075696	Novel
Zagadka Srebrnego Ducha	23 March 2022	Wilga	9788328075696	Novel

Alfred Wiewiór

Title	Publication date	Publisher	ISBN	Notes
Alfred Wiewiór i tajemnicza walizka	23 March 2022	Grupa Wydawnicza Foksal, Wilga	9788328095878	Children's literature
Alfred Wiewiór i posążek faraona	28 September 2022	Grupa Wydawnicza Foksal, Wilga	9788328096547	Children's literature
Alfred Wiewiór i znikające precle	28 September 2022	Grupa Wydawnicza Foksal, Wilga	9788328096547	Children's literature
Alfred Wiewiór i znikające precle	21 March 2023	Grupa Wydawnicza Foksal, Wilga	9788383181042	Children's literature
Alfred Wiewiór i skradziona dynia	11 October 2023	Grupa Wydawnicza Foksal, Wilga	9788328093027	Children's literature
Alfred Wiewiór i zagadka pluszowego misia	15 May 2024	Grupa Wydawnicza Foksal, Wilga	9788383192666	Children's literature
Alfred Wiewiór i świąteczne ciasteczka	13 November 2024	Grupa Wydawnicza Foksal, Wilga	9788383192673	Children's literature
Alfred Wiewiór i zagubione baletki	26 March 2025	Grupa Wydawnicza Foksal, Wilga	9788383199658	Children's literature
Detektyw Alfred Wiewiór i bezcenny paw	17 June 2026	Grupa Wydawnicza Foksal, Wilga	9788384254462	Children's literature

Others

Title	Publication date	Publisher	ISBN	Notes
Mali Agenci. Dziecięcy świat przygód	2007	Papilon	9788360931110	Children's literature
Opowiadania z morałem	15 October 2013	Papilon	9788324523429	Children's literature; anthology by multiple authors
Niezwykłe święta Kornelii	2009	Zielona Sowa	9788379835560	Children's literature
Hinkul na bezkociej wyspie	2010	Book House	9788376124230	Children's literature
O smoku, który chciał zostać rycerzem	2012	Wilga	9788325905071	Children's literature
Tata i ja	2013	Skrzat	9788374378697	Children's literature
Hotel pod Twarożkiem	1 April 2014	Skrzat	9788378958581	Children's literature
Opowieści spod czereśni	11 May 2016	Zielona Sowa	9788379837601	Children's literature
Nieustraszona babcia Adela i kosmiczna przygoda	2016	Zielona Sowa	9788379836598	Children's literature
12 ważnych praw, Polscy autorzy o prawach dzieci	2017	Centrum Edukacji Dziecięcej	9788327102539	Children's literature; anthology by multiple authors
Michałek i pudełko niespodzianek	2017	Papilon	9788327107145	Children's literature
Buntalki	2018	Zielona Sowa	9788380737211	Children's literature
Safari w wielkim mieście	23 April 2025	Wilga	9788383181059	Children's literature
Niesamowite przygody Bereniki Szprot. Zagubiona przesyłka	6 May 2026	Wydawnictwo Literackie	9788308088852	Children's literature
