= Montreal Women's Symphony Orchestra =

First women's symphony orchestra in Canada

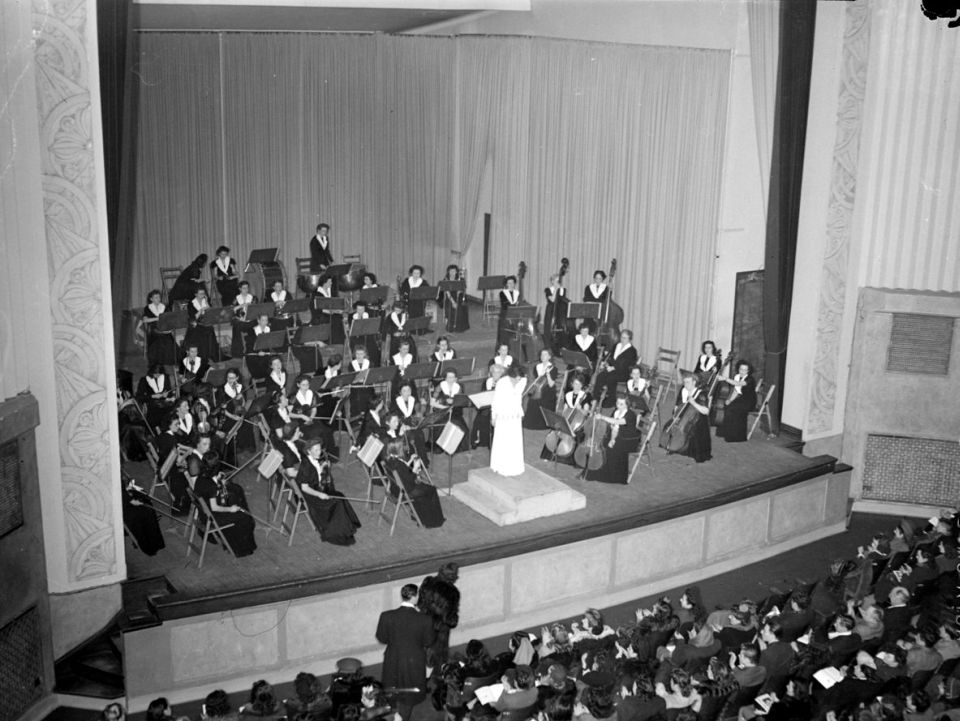
The Montreal Women's Symphony Orchestra in concert, Plateau Hall, 11 January 1945

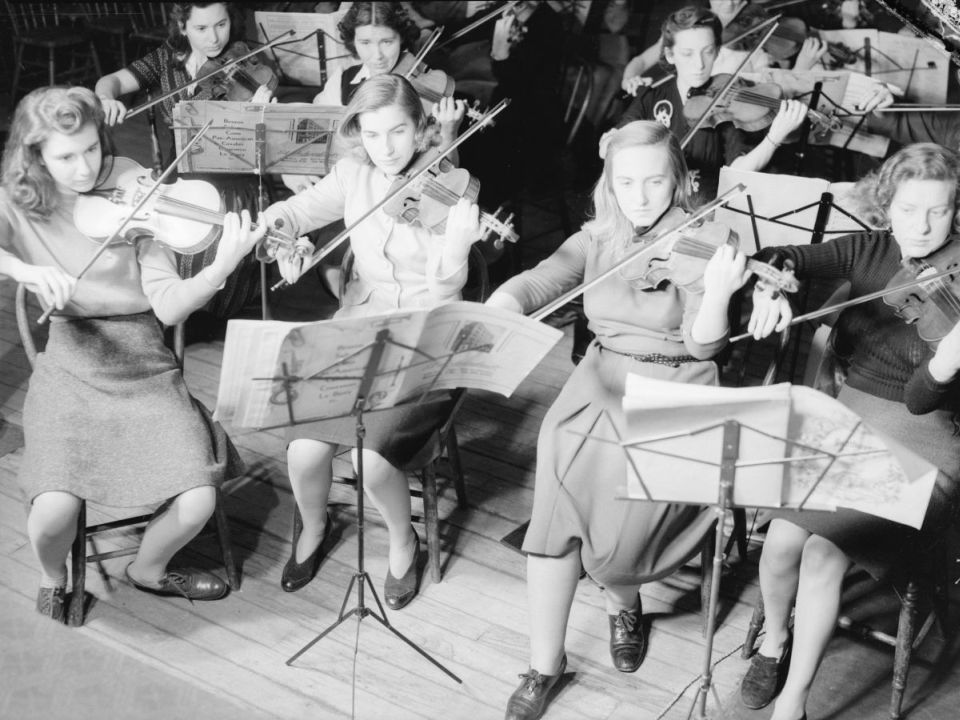
Musicians during a rehearsal of the Montreal Women's Symphony Orchestra, 9 January 1942

The Montreal Women's Symphony Orchestra (MWSO) (French: Symphonie féminine de Montréal) founded in Montreal, Quebec, Canada was started in 1940 and ending in 1965. It was the first women's symphony orchestra in Canada. [An earlier women's symphony, The New York Women's Symphony Orchestra was formed in 1935 by conductor and pianist, Antonia Brico.] The Montreal Women's Symphony Orchestra was founded by Ethel Stark, its conductor, and Madge Bowen.

The home auditorium of the Montréal Women's Symphony Orchestra was Plateau Hall and the orchestra consisted of around 75 professional and amateur musicians, with the orchestra in the beginning taking on any amateur musician who could "hold an instrument". Amateur musicians were not used after 1947. An orchestra that was managed by and solely consisted of women was revolutionary at the time since women were believed incapable of enough organisation and stamina to play musical instruments. Furthermore, women were not widely accepted in the classical music profession. Due to the inspiration the MWSO provided to women across Canada, it played an important role in the Canadian women's movement.

== History ==
The orchestra first rehearsed in the home of Ethel Stark and gave its first concert in Mount Royal Park on July 29, 1940. This was followed by four concerts during the 1941-42 season and then around 10 concerts annually until the dissolution of the orchestra in the late 1960s. One of the orchestra's highest points was when it was invited to play at Carnegie Hall in New York City on October 22, 1947.

While the music of the European canon comprised most of the MWSO programming, introducing works of modern composers was also one of its priorities. In 1954, its subsidiary, The Ethel Stark Sinfonietta, performed the Canadian premier of Arnold Schoenberg’s Verklärte Nacht, Op. 4.

Violinist Mildred Goodman was the concert master of the orchestra from 1940–1961.

The dissolution of the orchestra in 1965 was caused in large part to the opening up of orchestras to women musicians and also the practice of using blind recitals for choosing the musicians. The latter practice allowed many more women into professional orchestras but it also made an orchestra consisting exclusively of women less appealing to aspiring female musicians.

== Achievements ==
The Montréal Women's Symphony Orchestra was notable for being the:

- First women's symphony orchestra in Canada
- Nurturing the first professional Black female orchestra musician to play in Carnegie Hall
- First Canadian symphony orchestra to perform at Carnegie Hall

== See also ==
- Montreal Symphony Orchestra
