= Agnieszka Żuchowska-Arendt =

Polish poet and translator (born 1983)

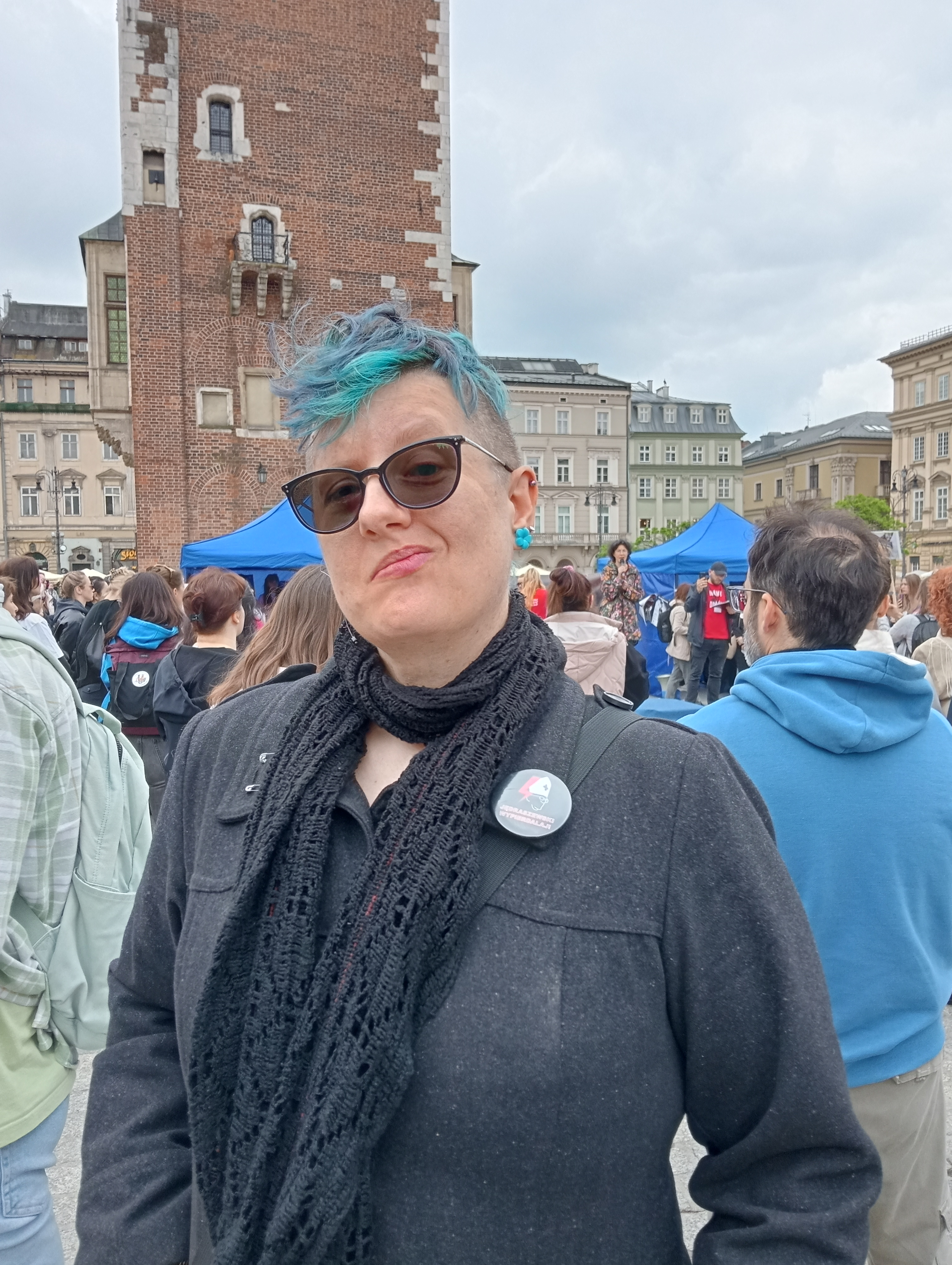
- Agnieszka Żuchowska-Arendt at the Main Square in Krakow, at a protest in defense of animal rights, May 2026
- Born: 1983 (age 42–43)
- Citizenship: Polish
- Occupations: poet, translator

Agnieszka Żuchowska-Arendt (born 1983) is a Polish poet, translator in South Slavic languages and activist.

== Biography ==
She attended Stanisław Wyspiański High School No. 1 in Mława. She studied at the Jagiellonian University.

She has translated texts from Serbian, Croatian, Bosnian, and Slovenian literature. Her work has been published in magazines such as Helikopter. She has published three volumes of poetry and one collection of short stories. She sings in the Krakow Revolutionary Choir.

== Works ==
=== Poetry ===
- Biała masa tabletek (Wydawnictwo Krytyki Artystycznej, 2005)
- gutenmorgen (Fundacja Duży Format, 2019)
- Wieszak i pogrzebacz (wydawnictwo papierwdole, 2022)

=== Prose ===
- Znikomat (set of short stories, ebook, 2009)

=== Translations ===
- Zoran Krušvar, Wykonawcy Bożego Zamysłu (Runa, 2009)
- Zoran Krušvar, Pluszowe bestie (AdPublik, 2012)
- Borko Veljović, Dzieci bez oczu (AdPublik, 2012)
- Zoran Žmirić, Blockbuster (AdPublik, 2012)
- Šejla Šehabović, Make up (wiersze, AdPublik, 2012)
- Šejla Šehabović, Opowieści, rodzaj żeński, liczba mnoga (AdPublik, 2012)
- Refik Ličina, Szklarnie (Nokturn, 2014)
- Ranko Risojević, Bośniacki kat (Nokturn, 2014)
- Dušan Savić, Porajmos (K. I. T. Stowarzyszenie Żywych Poetów, 2016)
- Saša Stojanović, S-WAR (Sarem Publishing, 2017)
- Dušan Savić, Wiedeńskie koło (K. I. T. Stowarzyszenie Żywych Poetów, 2019)
- Enes Halilović, Liście na wodzie (wiersze, K. I. T. Stowarzyszenie Żywych Poetów, 2019)
- Tomo Podstenšek, Krajobraz z martwą babcią (Wydawnictwo Fundacja Duży Format, 2021)
- Daliborka Kiš-Juzbaša, Chroń własny tyłek i nie myśl o śmierci (WBPiCAK, 2023)
