= Ethel Stark =

Canadian musician (1910–2012)

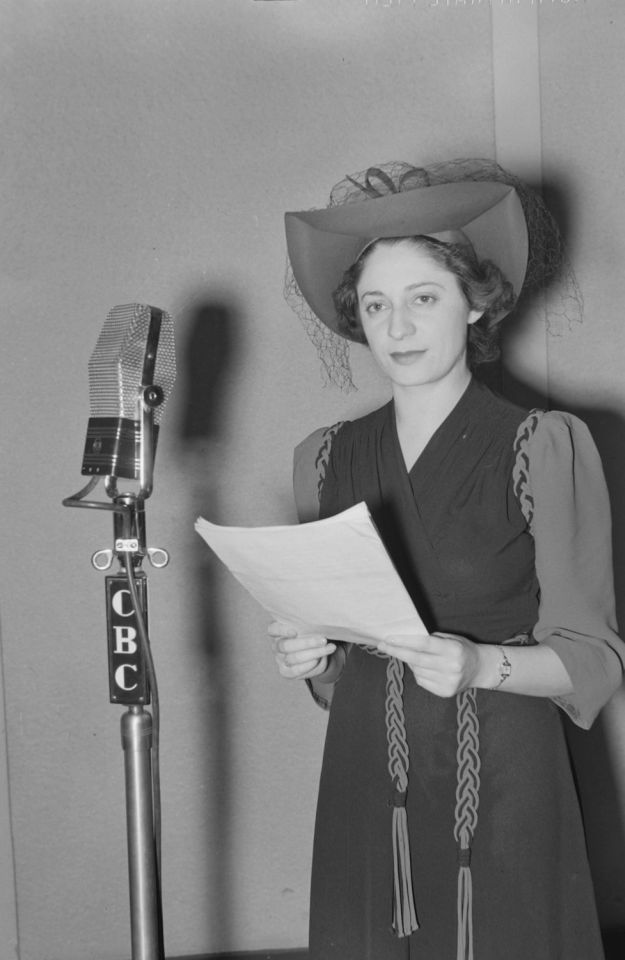
- Ethel Stark in 1941

Background information
- Born: 25 August 1910; Montreal, Quebec
- Died: 16 February 2012 (aged 101) Montreal, Quebec
- Instrument: Violin

Ethel Stark, CM GOQ (25 August 1910 – 16 February 2012) was a Canadian violinist and conductor.

Born in Montreal, Quebec, she studied at the McGill Conservatory of Music with Alfred De Sève and Alfred Whitehead. From 1928 to 1934, she studied at the Curtis Institute of Music with Lea Luboshutz, Louis Bailly, Artur Rodziński, Fritz Reiner and Carl Flesch. She was the first Canadian to be accepted to that school. For many years she taught on the faculty of the Conservatoire de musique du Québec à Montréal.

In 1979 she was made a Member of the Order of Canada. In 2003 she was made a Grand Officer of the National Order of Quebec. In 1980 she was awarded a Doctor of Laws, honoris causa degree from Concordia University.

She died in Montreal and was buried in Montreal's Spanish and Portuguese Congregation Cemetery.

A park in Montreal has been named after her. Parc Ethel-Stark is located at the corner of Prince-Arthur Ouest and Clark streets.

== Montreal Women's Symphony ==
In 1940, at the age of 29, Ethel founded the Montreal Women's Symphony Orchestra, which she conducted until 1960. She was the first conductor of an all women's symphony. The decision to form this orchestra was a spur of the moment decision that Stark made.

The first performance of the Montreal Women's Symphony took place in the summer of 1940 to a crowd of 5,000 people. Critics raved that it was ingenious and that it “had broken away from conservative ideas about music and women in music."

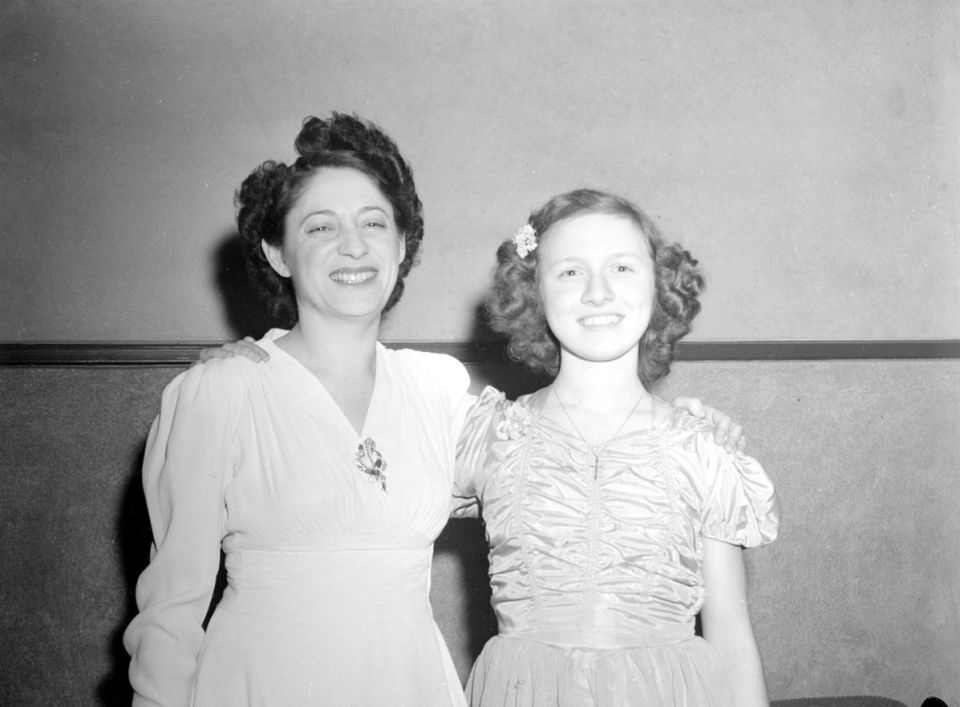
Ethel Stark & Sylvia Zaremba in 1945

The Toronto Symphony “Pop” Concert was guest conducted by Ethel in February 1946. The performance was received warmly, and gaining recognition and popularity, the Montreal Women's Symphony signed a contract in autumn of 1947. Ethel was noted as feeling, “that the contract to play at Carnegie Hall is not so much to her and her musicians the answer to every artist’s hopes and ambitions as an acknowledgment that at last it is accepted that there’s room for women in music."
