= Agnieszka Machówna =

Polish con artist and bigamist (c. 1648 –1681)

- Born: c. 1648; Kolbuszowa, Polish–Lithuanian Commonwealth
- Died: 12 July 1681 (aged 32–33); Lublin, Polish–Lithuanian Commonwealth
- Cause of death: Executed
- Criminal charges: Forgery, theft of property, adultery, and perjury

Agnieszka Machówna (c. 1648 – 12 July 1681) was a Polish con artist and bigamist. Born in the peasantry, she is famous for her fraud in posing as a member of the Zborowski family. She was convicted of forgery, theft, adultery, and perjury, and was sentenced to death and executed.

== Life ==
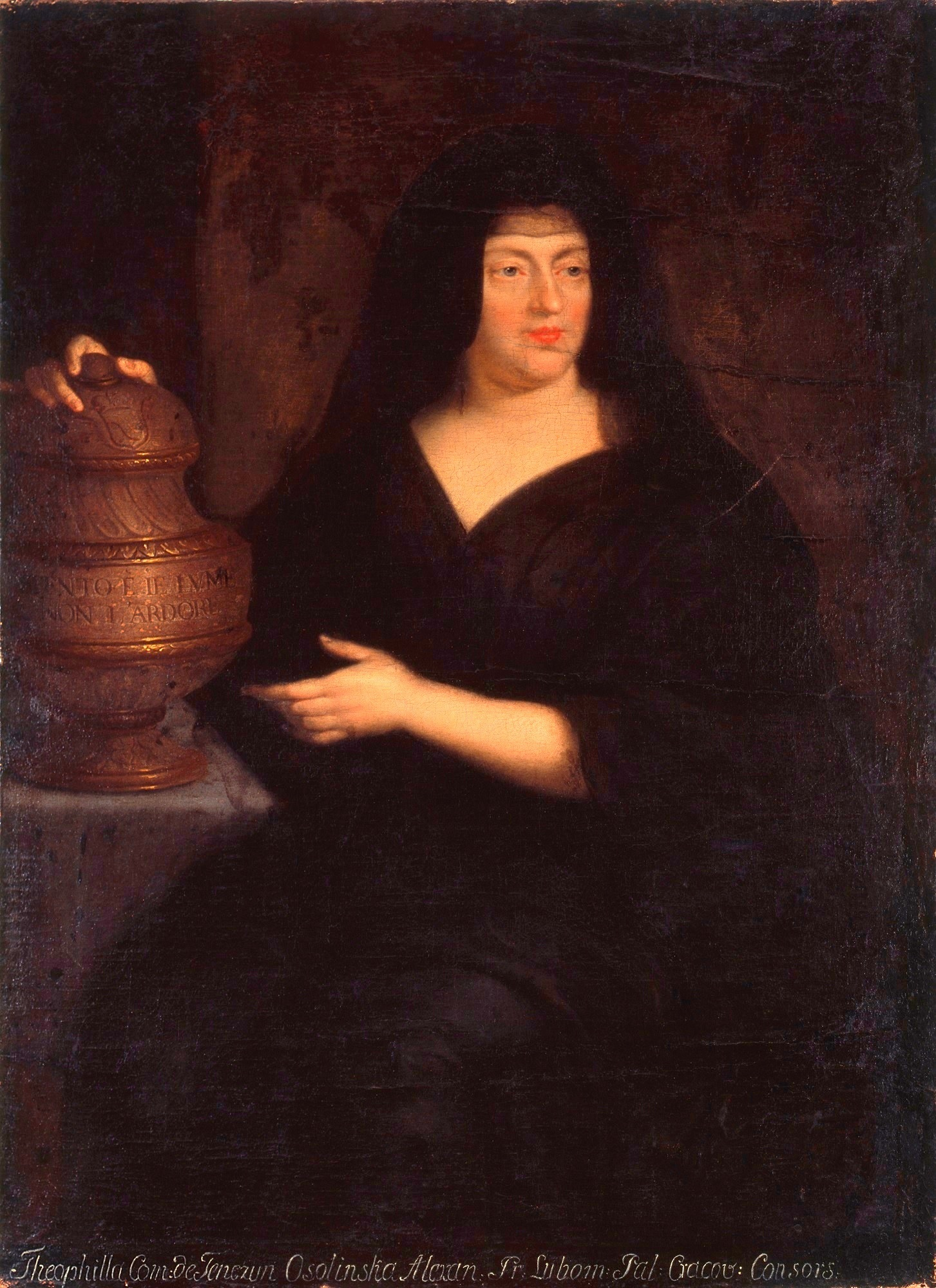
Helena Tekla Lubomirska, benefactress of Machówna, by Claude Callot

Machówna was born around 1648 in the village of Kolbuszowa. Her father, Mikaj Mach, was a military drummer and her mother was a peasant woman. She was likely baptized under the name "Jadwiga". Her mother worked as a servant at the Lubomirski Palace, and Duchess Helena Tekla Lubomirska sent Machówna to a local parish priest to teach her to read and write.

She married Bartosz Zatorski, the court Cossack of the Lubomirski family, at age 16. Zatorski was prone to beating her in fits of drunken rage, and Machówna was unhappy with her life in Kolbuszowa, wanting a more opulent life than what she had there. She ran away to Kraków, and then to Warsaw. Machówna took advantage of her education and exposure to court manners by falsely claiming to be Aleksandra Zborowska, daughter of the late Marcin Zborowski. As the Rytwiany branch of the Zborowski family was nearly extinct, her story was not questioned. To account for questions as to how she could still be alive, Machówna lied that she hid from enemy troops during the Swedish Deluge as a child and lived secretly in several rural manors.

With her claims accepted, she married Kollati, a wealthy officer of the Austrian army who was staying at the court of Eleonore of Austria; however, he soon abandoned her so that he could become involved with other women in Vienna. Machówna then married Stanisław Rupniowski, the castellan of Biecz, who took her to Paris. After Rupniowski died unexpectedly, Machówna returned to Poland and asserted her right to inherit his estates. Rupniowski's sister, Anna Szembekowa, brought a lawsuit against her at the Crown Tribunal in Lublin alleging fraud, but Machówna failed to appear before the court. Machówna seduced Stanisław Domaszewski, the starosta of Łuków, and married him as her fourth husband. Domaszewski accepted a bribe from the Rupniowski family to turn his wife over to the Tribunal; as she could not prove direct descent from the Zborowski line, Machówna was arrested and put in prison. She was convicted of forgery, theft of property, adultery, and perjury and was sentenced to have her breasts torn off with pliers and then be beheaded. (Note: Being executed by being beheaded instead of other forms was a privilege of the nobility.) The first part of the punishment was not carried out, but Machówna was executed on 12 July 1681 in Lublin.

== In culture ==
Polish poets Wespazjan Kochowski and Jan Gawiński both wrote poems commemorating Machówna's death. In both of the poems, she is presented "bidding farewell to the world". Nierządnicy żywot atłasowy, a 1972 novel by Jan Ziółkowski, follows Machówna's life.
