= Katalin Váradi =

- Born: 8 January 1948; Budapest, Hungary
- Died: 24 September 2015 (aged 67)
- Genres: Operetta; Opera; Musical theatre
- Occupations: Conductor; Pianist; Piano teacher
- Instrument: Piano

Katalin Váradi (8 January 1948 – 24 September 2015) was a Hungarian conductor, pianist, and piano teacher. She conducted at the Budapest Operetta Theatre for 24 years, where she was known for operettas by Emmerich Kálmán, Franz Lehár and Victor Jacobi, and from 2009 to 2012 she was music director of the Miskolc National Theatre.

== Life ==
She began her piano studies at the Franz Liszt Academy of Music in 1967 under Tibor Wehner, and completed the conducting program between 1969 and 1973 as a student of András Kórodi.

She began teaching at the Béla Bartók Conservatory in 1972 and served as a part-time instructor at the Academy of Music between 1975 and 1977. Alongside her teaching, she worked at the Opera House starting in 1973 as a conducting répétiteur. In 1980, at the invitation of László Vámos, she joined the Budapest Operetta Theatre, where she conducted primarily works from the classical repertoire, serving as principal conductor from 1984. In 1988, a concert evening she devised, featuring evergreen hits and titled Szép primadonna, csodál a világ ("Beautiful Prima Donna, the World Admires You"), premiered. She also led the Tatabánya Symphony Orchestra for several years. After leaving her position in the capital, she joined the Miskolc National Theatre in 2004, serving as the institution's music director from 2009 until 2012, when the theatre's new management did not renew her contract. At the theatre in the Borsod county seat, she played a significant role in developing the orchestra, and under her leadership, high-quality opera performances were staged in the city. Following her time in Miskolc, she conducted operetta and musical productions in Pécs, Szeged, Veszprém, and Zalaegerszeg. She was involved in a car accident in 2014 but returned to conducting after a hiatus of a few months.

She regularly conducted during the Operetta Theatre's international tours and, starting in 2001, was a returning guest conductor for a Japanese operetta society. She also taught at an opera studio in Japan. As a conductor, she took part in the 1976 Gino Marinuzzi Memorial Competition in Sanremo, where she received three special awards.

== Awards and honors ==
- 2009 – Sándor Hevesi Prize
- 2012 – Déryné Theatre Prize of the city of Miskolc

== Sources ==
- Ki kicsoda 2000 (Who's Who 2000). Editor-in-chief: Péter Hermann. Budapest, 1999. Greger-Biográf K. ISSN 1215-7066
- Ki kicsoda a magyar zeneéletben? (Who's Who in Hungarian Musical Life). Ed. András Székely. 2nd ed. Budapest, 1988. Zeneműkiadó. ISBN 9633306728
- "Váradi Katalin". PORT.hu (in Hungarian).
