= Madison Symphony Orchestra =

American symphony orchestra in Madison, Wisconsin

- Orchestra
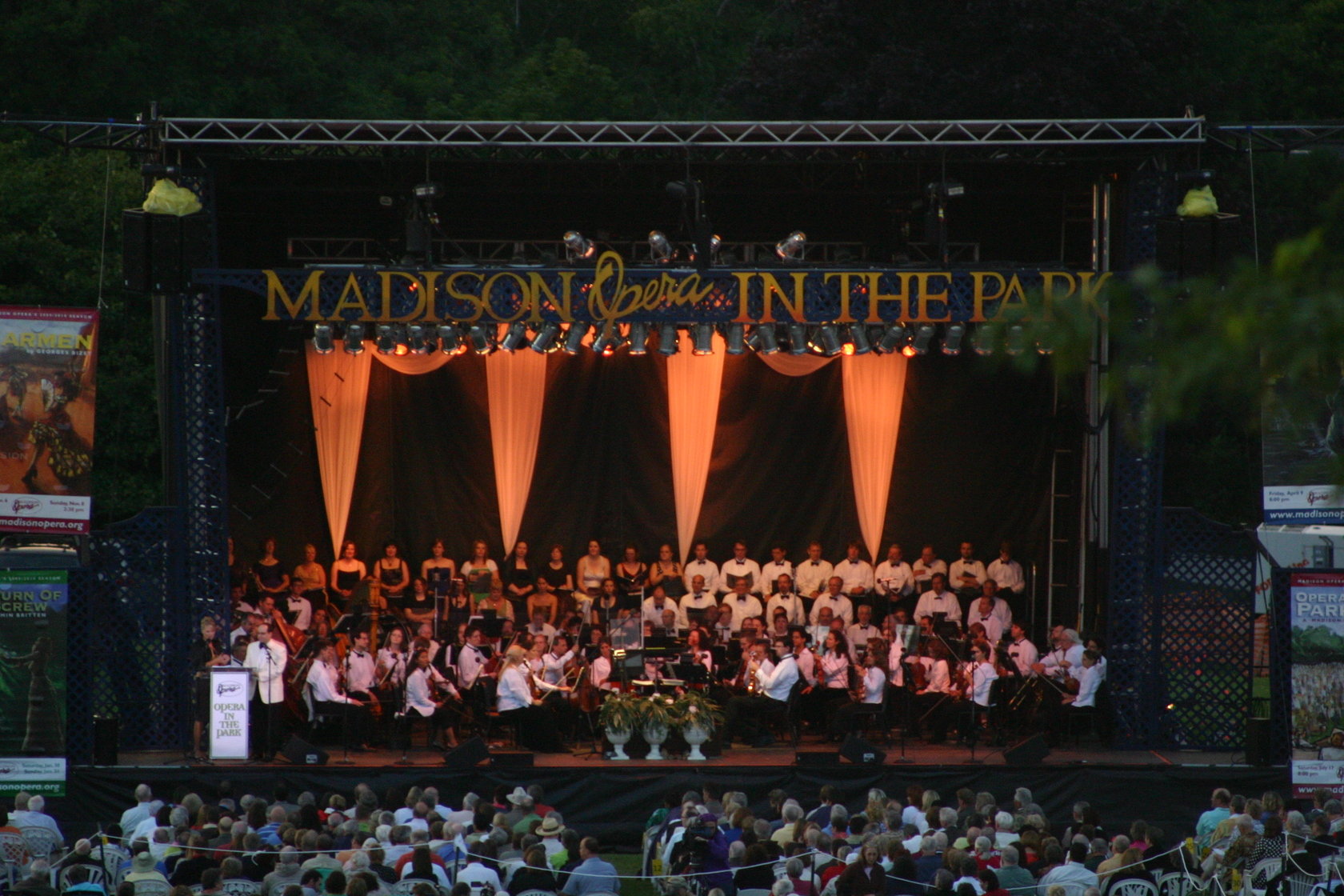
- Madison Opera's Opera in the Park, 2009, Featuring the Madison Symphony Orchestra
- Founded: 1925
- Location: Madison, Wisconsin
- Concert hall: Overture Center for the Arts
- Principal conductor: Laura Jackson
- Website: madisonsymphony.org

The Madison Symphony Orchestra (MSO) is an orchestra headquartered in Madison, Wisconsin. On July 16, 2026, Laura Jackson was introduced the orchestra's music director designate and conductor, succeeding John DeMain, who retired after 32 years at the orchestra's helm and has assumed the title of music director emeritus. She will assume the post as the MSO's music director and conductor in fall 2027.

The orchestra was founded in 1925 as a small community ensemble and is now a full-sized, professional orchestra. In addition to presenting eight triple-performance subscription concerts, the MSO also offers an array of Education and Community Engagement Programming for all ages including young people's concerts, musician residency programs, and guest artist master classes.

== Overture Hall ==
The Madison Symphony Orchestra performs in Madison's Overture Hall, one of two theaters in Madison's Overture Center for the Arts, a gift given to Madison by longtime MSO patrons W. Jerome Frautschi and his wife, Pleasant Rowland Frautschi. The Frautschis' gift held the distinction of being one of the largest gifts ever donated to the performing arts by a single donor in American history, actually exceeding the entire budget of the National Endowment for the Arts. Their gift in turn inspired a wave of gifts to the performing arts nationwide.

Overture Hall has been described as "one of the acoustically finest halls in America" by guest artists, conductors, and visiting shows alike; and among other notable features the hall possesses the "Overture Concert Organ", custom built for the Overture Center by renowned organ builder, Johannes Klais of Bonn, Germany. At twenty tons, the Klais organ is the largest movable object in any theater in America, with a capability to move forward and back into storage on a set of railroad tracks. The organ is owned and maintained by the Madison Symphony Orchestra and provides the orchestra with superior augmentation to such works as Richard Strauss' "Also sprach Zarathustra" or Gustav Holst's "The Planets." The MSO also presents an organ performance series featuring MSO's principal organist and organ curator, Greg Zelek, and visiting organists.
