= Ukrainian Freedom Orchestra =

Symphony orchestra based in Ukraine

- Orchestra
- members wear this ribbon
- Founded: 2022
- Principal conductor: Keri-Lynn Wilson
- Website: www.ukrainianfreedomorchestra.org

The Ukrainian Freedom Orchestra is an orchestra composed of refugees who have fled Ukraine following the 2022 Russian invasion of Ukraine, and Ukrainian members of other European orchestras.

== History ==
The Ukrainian Freedom Orchestra is an orchestra composed of Ukraine refugees from the 2022 Russian invasion of Ukraine, and Ukrainian members of other European orchestras.

The Canadian conductor Keri-Lynn Wilson, who has Ukrainian ancestry, provided the impetus for the creation of the orchestra, which the Metropolitan Opera of New York and the Polish National Opera immediately supported as a gesture of solidarity with Ukraine.

The 74 musicians, all Ukrainians – recent refugees, Ukrainian members from some European orchestras (e.g. Tonkünstler Orchestra, Belgian National Orchestra and Royal Concertgebouw Orchestra) and some of the top musicians of Kyiv, Lviv, Kharkiv, Odesa and elsewhere in Ukraine – assembled in Warsaw 10 days before the inaugural concert for intensive rehearsals. The inaugural concert was held in Warsaw on July 28 (2022) at the Polish National Opera. The programme of this concert included the 7th Symphony by the Ukrainian composer Valentyn Silvestrov, Frédéric Chopin’s Piano Concerto No. 2 (soloist: Anna Fedorova), Leonore's aria Abscheulicher! Wo eilst du hin? from Beethoven’s opera Fidelio (soloist: Liudmyla Monastyrska) and the 4th Symphony in E-minor by Johannes Brahms. On July 31 the Orchestra performed the same programme at the 2022 BBC Proms, a performance that was hailed by The Guardian as "highly impressive and deeply moving".

The Ukrainian Freedom Orchestra continued its world concert tour with concerts in the United Kingdom – Edinburgh (Edinburgh International Festival) and Snape (Snape Maltings, Suffolk), Germany – Munich (Isar Philharmonic Hall), Berlin (Konzerthaus) and Hamburg (Elbphilharmonie), France – Orange (Chorégies d'Orange Festival, Vaucluse), Netherlands – Amsterdam (Royal Concertgebouw Festival) and Ireland – Dublin (National Concert Hall). In European cultural capitals, the orchestra was greeted with standing ovations and positive reviews from critics. The tour concluded with concerts in New York (Lincoln Center) on August 18 and 19, 2022 and in Washington, DC (Kennedy Center) on August 20. The New York Times acclaimed the Lincoln Center performance as "admirably even-keeled and soft-spoken, an embodiment of a cultured nation".

The orchestra began its fourth international tour in August 2025, with a repertoire that its patron, Olena Zelenska, First Lady of Ukraine, described as “musical treasures”. It featured a suite from a new opera The Mothers of Kherson, by Ukrainian composer Maxim Kolomiiets, with a libretto by American playwright George Brant, and commissioned by the Metropolitan Opera. The tour concluded with a performance at Cadogan Hall, London, on 29 August.

"I wanted to bring together Ukraine’s best orchestral musicians from home and abroad to demonstrate a proud artistic unity.
We are fighting on the cultural front for the freedom of Ukraine."

— Keri-Lynn Wilson

== Recordings ==
Deutsche Grammophon issued a recording of the orchestra's performance in Warsaw in 2023 of Beethoven’s Symphony No 9, with Schiller’s “Ode to Joy” sung by the soloists and chorus in Ukrainian. The opening word of the ode became “Slava”, from the cry "Slava Ukraini! (“Glory to Ukraine!") The soloists included the Ukrainian soprano Olga Kulchynska and the Ukrainian bass-baritone Vladyslav Buialskyi.

A Hymn to Peace, a recording of the orchestra's performance of Beethoven's Symphony No. 9 in Teatr Wielki, Warsaw was released in 2025.

In February 2026 Deutsche Grammophon released the orchestra's performance of Beethoven’s Symphony No 5. The concert was recorded live in Vilnius during the orchestra's 2025 tour. The recording was released in time for the fourth anniversary of Russia’s invasion of Ukraine.

Beethoven 5 and Suite from The Mothers of Kherson was released by Deutsche Grammophon in 2026.
