= Reno Philharmonic Orchestra =

Professional symphony

- Orchestra
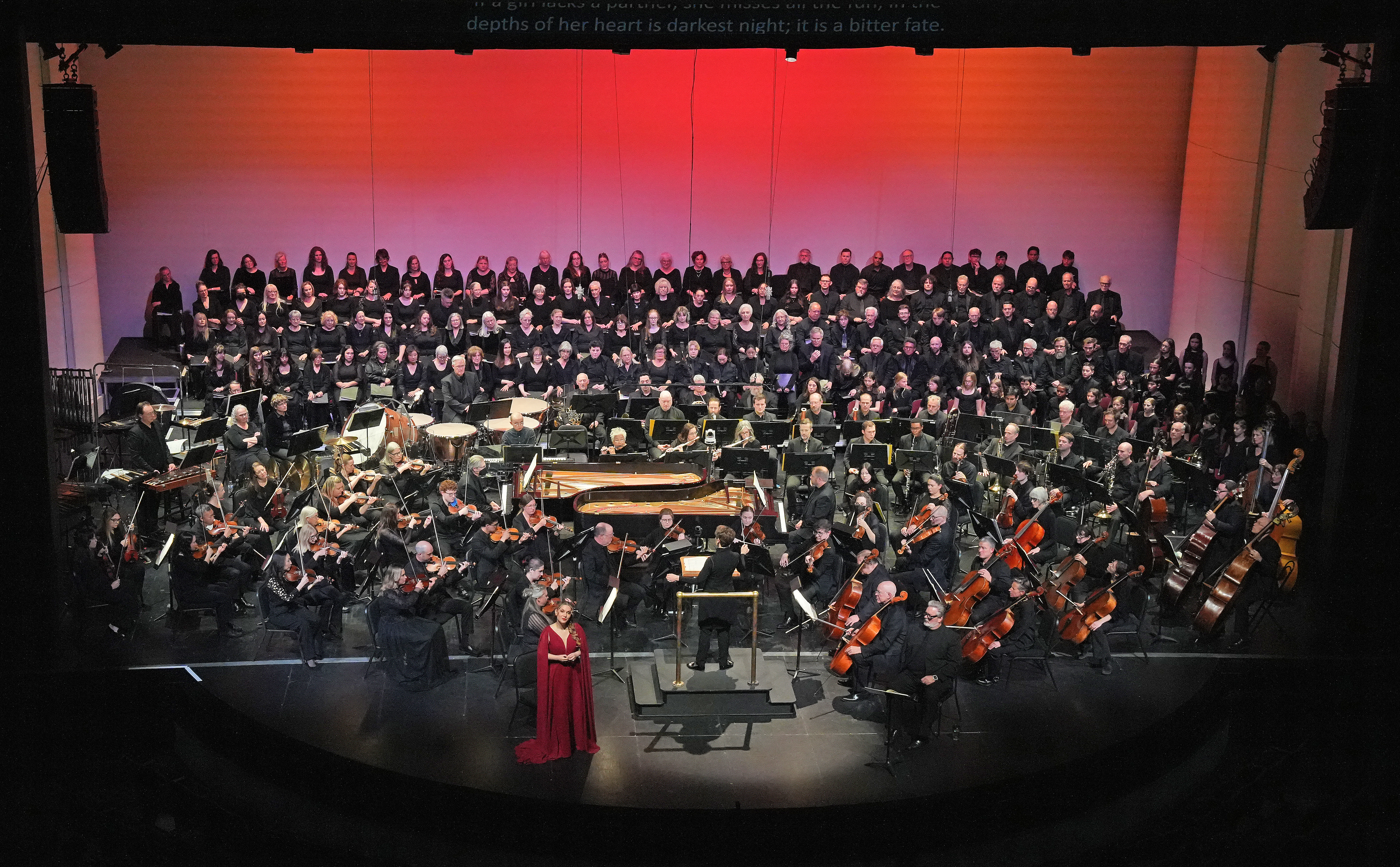
- The Reno Philharmonic performing Carmina Burana under conductor Laura Jackson on April 18, 2026
- Founded: 1969
- Location: Reno, Nevada
- Concert hall: Pioneer Center for the Arts
- Principal conductor: Laura Jackson
- Website: renophil.com

The Reno Philharmonic Orchestra (Reno Phil) is a professional symphony orchestra based in Reno, Nevada. Its season runs from late September through April. The current music director is Laura Jackson.

== History and organizational facts ==
The orchestra was founded in 1969 and is now led by music director Laura Jackson, is made up of over 60 professional musicians. They perform in Reno, Carson Valley, and the Lake Tahoe Region in various outdoor and indoor venues. The popular Classix Series is presented from September to April. The orchestra also presents over 10 specialty performances throughout the year from the holiday classic, Spirit of the Season to July 4 in Genoa, Lake Tahoe Music Festival, and the perennially sold out Pops on the River. The first performance in the orchestra was in 1969.

Conductor Laura Jackson was named music director after the 2008–2009 audition season. The two-year search audition gained national recognition for its detailed process, the talented and diverse candidates, the use of technology to engage the community in the process, and the increases in ticket sales. Ms. Jackson's most recent prior post was associate conductor of the Atlanta Symphony Orchestra. The Reno Philharmonic Orchestra organizes more than 60 live performances per year in front of more than 50,000 seats.

The Reno Philharmonic Association also has an education department, which includes three youth orchestras, a series of 12 "Young People’s Concerts" performed throughout the school year, "Celebrate Strings," an after-school violin instruction program, and the "Discover Music" program, which brings music ensembles into schools. The education programs reach over 30,000 school-aged children per year and cover many areas of music and arts education that the school district does not have the resources to provide.

Reno Phil is the largest performing organization in arts in Northern Nevada.

Most recently, the Reno Phil performed the world premier of Zhou Tien's three movement opus, "Transcend" – commemorating the 150th anniversary of the First Transcontinental Railroad's completion. The work was commissioned by 13 American orchestras and received its world premiere on April 27–28, 2019 by the Reno Phil.

== Education programs ==
=== Young People's Concerts ===
Reno Philharmonic currently presents 12 Young People's Concerts for all third, fourth and fifth grade students of Washoe County School District and outlying area schools.

=== Discover Music ===
The Discover Music Program consists of musical ensembles of two to five musicians, who travel to selected Washoe County and regional elementary schools to perform interactive child-friendly music programs. Ensembles for the 2009–2010 season include strings brass, harp/vibraphone, and percussion. These are designed to give elementary school children a close-up look at symphonic musicians, music, and instruments through performances, demos, and participatory activities.

=== Youth Orchestras ===
The Reno Philharmonic Association comprises three full high-level youth orchestras consisting of woodwind, brass, percussion, and string players between the ages of 12 and 18 from the greater Truckee Meadows region. The Youth Concert Orchestra (YCO) is a preparatory ensemble geared toward developing technical and performance skills. The YCO is conducted by Reno Phil musician Dustin Budish and YSO is conducted by Dr. Jason Altieri, who also conducts the University of Nevada Reno Orchestra. In 2009, despite economic pressures, the Reno Philharmonic is introducing a new strings-only ensemble, the Youth Strings Symphonia (YSS), in partnership with the Washoe County School District. The YSS, conducted by Carol Laube, was established to serve young string players in grades 4–8.

== Music directors ==
- Gregory Stone, 1969–1979
- Ron Daniels, 1979–1998
- Barry Jekowsky, 1998–2008
- Laura Jackson, 2009–
