= List of A German Requiem discs =

This is a non-exhaustive list of recordings of A German Requiem (Ein deutsches Requiem), Op. 45 (1868) by Johannes Brahms. The primary table features recordings of the standard version with full orchestra. Additional recordings that use either the two-piano and timpani version by Brahms himself or arrangements by other composers are provided in list format below the main table.

== Recordings ==
Year	Conductor	Chorus, orchestra	Soprano, baritone	Label	Notes
1943	Arturo Toscanini	Westminster Choir, NBC Symphony Orchestra	Vivien Della Chiesa; Herbert Jansssen	Naxos 8.110839, historical CD reissue	sung in English
1947	Herbert von Karajan	Choral Society of the Friends of Music, Vienna, Vienna Philharmonic	Elisabeth Schwarzkopf; Hans Hotter	EMI	
1947	Wilhelm Furtwängler	Lucerne Festival Choir, Lucerne Festival Orchestra	Elisabeth Schwarzkopf; Hans Hotter	Istituto Discografico Italiano IDIS 6674	live performance
1948	Robert Shaw	RCA Victor Chorale and Orchestra	Eleanor Steber; James Pease	RCA Victor	first commercial recording of the work in the USA
1948	Wilhelm Furtwängler	Musikalista Sällskapet Kör, Stockholm Konsertförenings Orkester	Kerstin Lindberg-Torlind; Bernhard Sönnerstedt	Warner Classics (2018 issue)	recorded live at Konzerthuset, Stockholm
1954	Bruno Walter	Westminster Choir, New York Philharmonic	Irmgard Seefried; George London	CBS	
1955	Fritz Lehmann	Chor der St. Hedwigs-Kathedrale, Berlin Philharmonic	Maria Stader; Otto Wiener	Deutsche Grammophon	
1955	Rudolf Kempe	Chor der St. Hedwigs-Kathedrale, Berlin Philharmonic	Elisabeth Grümmer; Dietrich Fischer-Dieskau	EMI	recorded in the Jesus-Christus-Kirche, Berlin-Dahlem
1956	Otto Klemperer	Kölner Rundfunkchor, Kölner Rundfunk-Sinfonie-Orchester	Elisabeth Grümmer; Hermann Prey	International Classical Artists	recorded live
1959	Carl Schuricht	Stuttgart Vokalensemble, Hesse Radio Choir, Stuttgart Radio Symphony Orchestra	Maria Stader; Hermann Prey	Hänssler Classic 93144	
1960	Karl Eliasberg	Republican Russian Choir Cappella, USSR State Symphony Orchestra	Nadezhda Sukhovitsyna; Leonid Petrov	Russian Compact Disc	released in 2010 by Vista Vera
1960	Sergiu Celibidache	Chorus of RAI Milano, Orchestra Sinfonica di Milano della RAI	Agnes Giebel; Hermann Prey	Archipel Records ARPCD0848	live radio recording from 19 February
1961	Otto Klemperer	Philharmonia Chorus, Philharmonia Orchestra	Elisabeth Schwarzkopf; Dietrich Fischer-Dieskau	EMI	
1961	Eugene Ormandy	Mormon Tabernacle Choir, Philadelphia Orchestra	Phyllis Curtin; Jerome Hines	Columbia Records	sung in English
1964	Herbert von Karajan	Wiener Singverein, Berlin Philharmonic	Gundula Janowitz; Eberhard Waechter	Deutsche Grammophon	
1964	Karl Richter	Chorus of the RTF, Orchestre National de France	Evelyn Lear; Thomas Stewart	EMI	recorded live on 8 April 1964 in Paris
1969	Erich Leinsdorf	New England Conservatory Chorus, Boston Symphony Orchestra	Montserrat Caballe; Sherill Milnes	RCA Victor	
1972	Daniel Barenboim	Edinburgh Festival Chorus, London Philharmonic Orchestra	Edith Mathis; Dietrich Fischer-Dieskau	Deutsche Grammophon	
1976	Herbert von Karajan	Wiener Singverein, Berlin Philharmonic	Anna Tomowa-Sintow; José van Dam	EMI	
1977	Lorin Maazel	New Philharmonia Chorus, New Philharmonia Orchestra	Ileana Cotrubaș; Hermann Prey	CBS	
March 1978	Herbert von Karajan	Wiener Singverein, Berlin Philharmonic	Gundula Janowitz; José van Dam	Deutsche Grammophon, cat. 072 235-1	filmed at the Salzburg Easter Festival
1978	Georg Solti	Chicago Symphony Chorus, Chicago Symphony Orchestra	Kiri Te Kanawa; Bernd Weikl	Decca	1979 Grammy Award for Best Choral Performance
1978	Carlo Maria Giulini	Edinburgh International Festival Chorus, London Philharmonic Orchestra	Ileana Cotrubas; Dietrich Fischer-Dieskau	BBC Legends	recorded live, 26 August 1978
1978	Rafael Kubelik	Chor des Bayerischen Rundfunks, Bavarian Radio Symphony Orchestra	Edith Mathis; Wolfgang Brendel	Audite	recording of a concert on 29 September 1978
1980	Bernard Haitink	Vienna State Opera Chorus, Vienna Philharmonic	Gundula Janowitz; Tom Krause	Philips Records	
1981	Sergiu Celibidache	Munich Philharmonic Choir, Munich Bach Choir, Munich Philharmonic	Arleen Augér; Franz Gerihsen	EMI	recorded live
1983	Robert Shaw	Atlanta Symphony Chorus, Atlanta Symphony Orchestra	Arleen Augér; Richard Stilwell	Telarc	
1983	Giuseppe Sinopoli	Prague Philharmonic Chorus, Czech Philharmonic	Lucia Popp; Wolfgang Brendel	Deutsche Grammophon	
1983	James Levine	Chicago Symphony Chorus, Chicago Symphony Orchestra	Kathleen Battle; Håkan Hagegård	RCA	1984 Grammy Award for Best Choral Performance
May 1983	Herbert von Karajan	Wiener Singverein, Wiener Philharmoniker	Barbara Hendricks; José van Dam	Deutsche Grammophon	
1983	János Ferencsik	Slovak Philharmonic Choir, Slovak Philharmonic Orchestra	Ilona Tokody; István Gáti	Hungaroton	
1984	Klaus Tennstedt	London Philharmonic Choir, London Philharmonic	Jessye Norman; Jorma Hynninen	EMI	issued 1996; re-issued by Brilliant Classics
1985	Herbert Kegel	Leipzig Radio Choir, Leipzig Radio Symphony Orchestra	Mari Anne Häggander; Siegfried Lorenz	Capriccio	
May 1985	Herbert von Karajan	Wiener Singverein, Wiener Philharmoniker	Kathleen Battle; José van Dam	Sony Classical SVD 53485	filmed in Vienna
1985	Wolfgang Sawallisch	BR Chor, Bavarian Radio Symphony Orchestra	Margaret Price; Thomas Allen	Orfeo CD 039101	
1987	Carlo Maria Giulini	Vienna State Opera Chorus, Vienna Philharmonic	Barbara Bonney; Andreas Schmidt	Deutsche Grammophon	recorded live
1990	John Eliot Gardiner	Monteverdi Choir, Orchestre Révolutionnaire et Romantique	Charlotte Margiono; Rodney Gilfry	Philips Classics	uses period instruments re-released in 2010 on Decca
1991	Richard Hickox	London Symphony Chorus, London Symphony Orchestra	Felicity Lott; David Wilson-Johnson	Chandos	
1991	Roger Norrington	Schütz Choir of London, London Classical Players	Lynne Dawson; Olaf Bär	EMI	uses period instruments re-released in 1999 on Virgin
1992	Claudio Abbado	Swedish Radio Choir, Eric Ericson Chamber Choir; Berlin Philharmonic	Cheryl Studer; Andreas Schmidt	Deutsche Grammophon	recorded live
1992	Daniel Barenboim	Chicago Symphony Chorus, Chicago Symphony Orchestra	Janet Williams; Thomas Hampson	Erato	
1992	André Previn	Vienna State Opera Chorus, Royal Philharmonic Orchestra	Margaret Price; Samuel Ramey	Teldec	
1992	Alexander Rahbari	Slovak Philharmonic Choir, Slovak Radio Symphony Orchestra	Miriam Gauci; Eduard Tumagian	Naxos	
1995	Herbert Blomstedt	San Francisco Symphony Chorus, San Francisco Symphony Orchestra	Elizabeth Norberg-Schulz; Wolfgang Holzmair	Decca	Grammy Award for Best Choral Performance
1995	Kurt Masur	Westminster Symphonic Choir, New York Philharmonic	Sylvia McNair; Håkan Hagegård	Teldec	
1996	Philippe Herreweghe	La Chapelle Royale, Collegium Vocale Gent, Orchestre des Champs-Élysées	Christiane Oelze; Gerald Finley	Harmonia Mundi	
1997	Cristian Mandeal	Cluj-Napoca State Philharmonic Choir, George & Enescu Bucharest Philharmonic Orchestra	Ramona Eremia; Gheorghe Crăsnaru	Arte Nova LC 03480	
1998	Frieder Bernius	Kammerchor Stuttgart, Klassiche Philharmonie Stuttgart	Julia Borchert; Michael Volle	Carus	
1999	Craig Jessop	Mormon Tabernacle Choir, Utah Symphony	Janice Chandler; Nathan Gunn	Telarc	English-language version by Robert Shaw
2002	Wolfgang Helbich	Bremer Domchor, Kammer-Sinfonie Bremen	Siri Thornhill; Klaus Mertens	MDG	
2002	André Previn	London Symphony Chorus, London Symphony Orchestra	Harolyn Blackwell; David Wilson-Johnson	LSO Live (LSO 0005)	
2003	Gerd Albrecht	Danish National Choir, Danish National Symphony Orchestra	Inger Dam-Jensen; Bo Skovhus	Chandos	
2004	Michel Corboz	Ensemble Vocal de Lausanne, Ensemble Instrumental de Lausanne	Christa Goetze; Werner Lechte	Virgin	
2006	Simon Rattle	Rundfunk Chor Berlin, Berlin Philharmonic	Dorothea Röschmann; Thomas Quasthoff	EMI	recorded live; Grammy Award for Best Choral Performance
2008	Robert Spano	Atlanta Symphony Chorus, Atlanta Symphony Orchestra	Twyla Robinson; Mariusz Kwiecień	Telarc	
2010	Karl-Friedrich Beringer	Windsbacher Knabenchor, Deutsches Symphonie-Orchester Berlin	Juliane Banse; Stephan Genz	Sony	
2010	Nikolaus Harnoncourt	Monteverdi Choir, Orchestre Révolutionnaire et Romantique	Genia Kühmeier; Thomas Hampson	RCA Red Seal, 88697 720662	
2010	Marek Janowski	Berlin Radio Choir, Berlin Radio Symphony Orchestra	Camilla Tilling; Detlef Roth	Pentatone PTC 5186361	
2010	Yannick Nézet-Séguin	London Philharmonic Choir, London Philharmonic	Elizabeth Watts; Stéphane Degout	LPO 0045	
2010	Valentin Radu	Ama Deus Ensemble	Tatyana Galitskaya; Ed Bara	Lyrichord LYR CD 6014	
2010	Christian Thielemann	Bavarian Radio Choir, Munich Philharmonic Orchestra	Christine Schäfer; Christian Gerhaher	Unitel Munich / C Major 703308 (DVD)	
2010	Valery Gergiev	Swedish Radio Choir, Rotterdam Philharmonic Orchestra	Solveig Kringelborn; Mariusz Kwiecień	BIS DVD 1750	
2011	Hansjorg Albrecht	Munich Bach Choir, Munich Bach Orchestra	Ruth Ziesak; Konrad Jarnot	Oehms OC 787	
2011	Paavo Järvi	Swedish Radio Choir, Frankfurt Radio Symphony Orchestra	Natalie Dessay; Ludovic Tézier	Erato 6286100	
2012	Johannes Fritzsch	Melbourne Symphony Orchestra Chorus, Melbourne Symphony Orchestra	Nicole Car; Teddy Tahu Rhodes	ABC Classics 4764811	
2012	John Eliot Gardiner	Monteverdi Choir, Orchestre Révolutionnaire et Romantique	Katharine Fuge; Matthew Brook	Soli Dei Gloria SDG 706	
2013	Marin Alsop	Leipzig MDR Radio Choir, MDR Leipzig Radio Symphony Orchestra	Anna Lucia Richter; Stephan Genz	Naxos 8.572996	
2013	Philippe Herreweghe	Collegium Vocale Gent, Orchestre des Champs-Élysées	Ilse Eerens; Andrew Foster-Williams	Chopin Institute NIFCDVD003 (DVD)	
2014	Valery Gergiev	London Symphony Chorus, London Symphony Orchestra	Sally Matthews; Christopher Maltman	LSO Live (LSO 0748)	
2014	Roderich Kreile	Dresdner Kreuzchor, Vocal Consort Dresden, Dresden Philharmonic	Sibylla Rubens; Daniel Ochoa	Berlin Classics (0300569BC)	
2014	Helmuth Rilling	Gächinger Kantorei, Bach-Collegium Stuttgart	Donna Brown; Gilles Cachemaille	Hänssler Classic HAEN91102	
2014	Antoni Wit	Warsaw Philharmonic Choir, Warsaw Philharmonic Orchestra	Christiane Libor; Thomas E. Bauer	Naxos (NX 3061)	
2015	Mariss Jansons	Netherlands Radio Choir, Royal Concertgebouw Orchestra	Genia Kühmeier; Gerald Finley	RCO Live RCO15003	
2016	Jan Willem de Vriend	Rotterdam Symphony Chorus, Residentie Orchestra	Renate Arends; Thomas Oliemans	Challenge Classics CC72738	
2019	Daniel Harding	Swedish Radio Choir, Swedish Radio Symphony Orchestra	Christiane Karg; Matthias Goerne	harmonia mundi (HMM902635)	
2019	Daniel Reuss	Capella Amsterdam, Orchestra of the 18th Century	Carolyn Sampson; André Morsch	Glossa, GCD 921126	
2020	Ralf Otto	Bachchor Mainz, Deutsche Radio Philharmonie Saarbrücken Kaiserslautern	Christina Gansch; Matthias Winckhler	Naxos (8574273)	
2020	Paavo Järvi	Latvian State Choir, Deutsche Kammerphilharmonie Bremen	Valentina Farcas; Matthias Goerne	C Major 753208 (DVD)	
2023	Ricardo Casero	Orquesta Reino de Aragón, Coro Amici Musicae	Iwona Sobotka; Isaac Galán	Halidon 8030615164035	
2024	Edward Gardner	Bergen Philharmonic Orchestra and Choirs	Johanna Wallroth; Brian Mulligan	Chandos CHSA 5271	
2025	Raphaël Pichon	Pygmalion	Sabine Devieilhe; Stéphane Degout	Harmonia Mundi	
2025	Masaaki Suzuki	Bach Collegium Japan	Miku Yasukawa; Jochen Kupfer	BIS 2751	
2025	Ken-David Masur	Milwaukee Symphony Chorus, Milwaukee Symphony Orchestra	Sonya Headlam; Dashon Burton	MSO Classics	

== Additional recordings ==
=== Two-piano and timpani version by Brahms ('London 1871' version) ===
- accentus Chamber Choir; Sandrine Piau (soprano); Stéphane Degout (baritone); Brigitte Engerer, Boris Berezovsky (pianists); Laurence Equilbey (conductor). Coro Records (2006)
- King's College Choir; Evgenia Rubinova (soprano); José Gallardo (baritone); Stephen Cleobury (conductor). EMI (2006)
- The Sixteen; Julie Cooper (soprano); Eamonn Dougan (baritone); Gary Cooper, Christopher Glynn (pianists); Harry Christophers (conductor). Coro Records (2006)
- Vasari Singers; Claire Seaton (soprano); Colin Campbell (baritone); Jeremy Filsell, Roderick Chadwick (pianists); Jeremy Backhouse (conductor). Guild GMCD7302 (2007)
- WDR Rundfunkchor Köln; Simone Nold (soprano), Kay Stiefermann (baritone), Ian Pace, Mark Knoop (piano), Peter Stracke (timpani); Rupert Huber (oonductor). Neos Classics NEOS30803 (2008)
- EuropaChorAkademie; Fionnuala McCarthy (soprano), Michael Volle (baritone), Jonathan Alder, Thorsten Kaldewei (pianists); Benjamin Heil (timpani); Joshard Daus (oonductor). Glor Classics GC09191 (2010)
- Rundfunkchor Berlin; Marlis Petersen (soprano), Konrad Jarnot (baritone); Philip Mayers, Philip Moll (pianists); Simon Halsey (conductor). Coviello COV41006 (2010)
- Maulbronner Kammerchor, Musica Sacra; Heidi Meier (soprano), Josef Wagner (baritone); GrauSchumacher Piano Duo; Jürgen Budday (conductor). K&K KuK105a (2012)
- Chorus Musicus Köln; Soile Isokoski (soprano), Andreas Schmidt (baritone); Andreas Grau, Gotz Schumacher (pianists); Christoph Spering (conductor). Naïve OP30140 (2012)
- Chorus sine nominee; Elena Copons (soprano), Adrian Eröd (baritone); Johanna Gröbner, Veronika Trisko (pianists); Johannes Hiemetsberger (conductor). Gramola 99014 (2014)
- Choir of King's College London; Mary Bevan (soprano), Marcus Farnsworth (baritone); James Bailieu, Richard Uttley (pianists); Joseph Fort (conductor). Delphian DCD34195 (2017; sung in English)
- Bella Voce; Michelle Areyzaga (soprano), Hugh Russell (baritone), Madeline Slettedahl, Craig Terry (pianists); Andrew Lewis (conductor). Naxos 8573952 (2019)
- Chorwerk Ruhr; Johanna Winkel (soprano), Krešimir Stražanac (baritone); Sebastian Breuing, Christoph Schnackertz (pianists); Florian Helgath (conductor). Coviello COV91905 (2019)
- Te Deum; Ida Nicolosi (soprano), Brian Ming Chu (baritone); Elisa Williams Bickers, Jan Kraybill (pianists); Matthew Christopher Shepard (conductor). Centaur CRC3647 (2019; sung in English)

=== Other arrangements ===
- Chamber ensemble arrangement by Iain Farrington: Yale Schola Cantorum; Natasha Schnur (soprano); Matt Sullivan (baritone); David Hill (conductor). Hyperion CDA68242 (2018)
