= Heiner Stadler =

German musician (1942–2018)

Heiner Stadler (April 9, 1942 – February 18, 2018) was a German jazz composer, record producer, pianist and arranger, whose work has traversed genres including jazz, blues and country, baroque, classical, romantic and contemporary classical music. He was also the founder and CEO of Labor Records, distributed by Naxos Records.

== Early life ==
Stadler was born April 9, 1942, in West Prussia (now part of Poland) in the town of Lessen (Łasin) in the county of Graudenz (Grudziąd). His great-grandmother was Josephine Amann-Weinlich, who founded and conducted Europe's first women's orchestra, the Wiener Damen-Orchester (later the Erste Europäische Damenorchester), which toured extensively, including an 1871 appearance at New York's Steinway Hall. Stadler studied piano at the Hamburg Conservatory and composition privately with composer Walter Steffens.

== Jazz composer and arranger ==
Stadler relocated to New York City in 1965 to begin a career as a jazz composer and pianist. His first commercially released work, an arrangement of Duke Ellington's composition "Main Stem" featuring saxophonist James Moody, Ron Carter, Kenny Barron, Freddie Waits et al., was issued in 1969 on the Milestone label. Prior to that, at a recording session in December 1966 at Nola Penthouse Sound Studios, Stadler recorded his composition entitled "The Fugue #2" which would become part of the pioneering 1973 release Brains on Fire. The 1966 session included Jimmy Owens on trumpet, Joe Farrell on tenor sax, trombonist Garnett Brown, pianist Don Friedman, bassist Barre Phillips and drummer Joe Chambers. The 1973 release also included sessions from 1971 featuring bassist Reggie Workman, Tyrone Washington on tenor sax and drummer Lenny White, along with Stadler himself on piano.

‘’Brains on Fire’’ was reissued in 2012 with additional tracks recorded through 1974. One notable addition was a twenty-minute duet between vocalist Dee Dee Bridgewater and Workman on bass (recorded July 3, 1973, at Generation Sound Studios, New York City, under the composer's supervision). The re-release also included Stadler's arrangement of Russ Freeman’s composition "Bea's Flat", originally written for trumpeter Chet Baker. Commissioned by the NDR Big Band and conducted by Dieter Glawischnig, the arrangement featured musicians Manfred Schoof, Gerd Dudek, Albert Mangelsdorff, Wolfgang Dauner, Lucas Lindholm and Tony Inzalaco.

As producer and arranger, Stadler was responsible for the 1978 album Tribute to Bird and Monk featuring Thad Jones, George Adams, George Lewis, Stanley Cowell, Reggie Workman and Lenny White. The acclaimed release received excellent reviews from Neil Tesser in Jazz Magazine and from DownBeat Magazine which honored the album with a five-star rating and recognized Stadler in the magazine's Annual Critic's Poll as a 'Talent Deserving Wider Recognition'.

Other releases of Stadler's own works include Jazz Alchemy (1976) featuring Charles McGhee, Richard Davis, Marilyn Crispell, Joshua Pierce (Recorded on August 13, 1975, at Minot Sound Studios, White Plains, New York) and Retrospection (a 1989 reissue including several previously unreleased tracks). Stadler has been a four-time recipient of National Endowment for the Arts Grants for composition as well as a grant recipient from the Creative Artist Public Service Program of the New York State Council on the Arts.

In 1988, dancer/choreographer Sin Cha Hong's Laughing Stone company performed her original work Seraphim at the Joyce Theater incorporating environmental sounds arranged by Stadler with a score by Pierre Henry, Diamanda Galas and Kirk Nurock's Natural Sounds Ensemble. In addition to his own work, in the 1970s he produced (together with partner Kent Cooper) concerts at New York's Hunter College and the Brooklyn Academy of Music with artists such as Pete Seeger, Arlo Guthrie, Sonny Terry & Brownie McGhee, John Lee Hooker, Lightnin' Hopkins, Buddy Guy & Junior Wells, Koko Taylor), Albert King, Louisiana Red and Peg Leg Sam.

== Record producer ==
Stadler's record productions include releases by blues musicians John Lee Hooker, Sonny Terry and Brownie McGhee, Louisiana Red, Johnny Shines and Roosevelt Sykes; classical pianists such as the Brazilian João Carlos Martins (the complete clavier works of Bach) and Arthur Moreira Lima (music of Chopin), Grete Sultan, Bulgarian musicians such as Pavlina Dokovska, Angela Tosheva, Nadejda Vlaeva, Ivan Spassov, Ivo Papazov and Gheorghi Arnaoudov, Lithuanian pianist Ieva Jokubaviciute, the Chinese-American pianist Margaret Leng Tan (new music by John Cage and others); the Brazilian guitarist Carlos Barbosa-Lima, jazz musicians Dee Dee Bridgewater, Thad Jones, George Lewis, Tyrone Washington, Reggie Workman, Ken Peplowski, Randy Sandke, and Jay Clayton; the Harlem Spiritual Ensemble; a large group of important twentieth-century composers including the Americans Harry Partch and Petr Kotik, Japanese composer Somei Satoh, Korean composer Isang Yun and many others.

He is particularly known for his extensive recordings of the American avant-garde pioneer John Cage, begun in cooperation with the composer and continuing until his death. He also supervised the release of Philip Glass's recording of Einstein on the Beach (originally for Tomato, currently available on Sony). Stadler has produced for Labor Records, Arabesque Records, Zoho, WERGO Records, Tomato Records, Arcadia Records and several labels within the Concord Music Group.

=== Labor Records ===
He founded Labor Records in 1973 as one of the first labels with what would subsequently be called a "cross-over" or "multi-cultural" point of view, and has served as owner, CEO, Producer and Executive Producer since inception. Labor's current catalogue focuses on unusual and often unknown repertoire coupled with landmark editions such as the complete keyboard works of J. S. Bach performed by the Brazilian pianist João Carlos Martins. Other projects include Music of Tribute, Labor's ambitious piano series as well as genre-crossing releases by Germany's Hanns Eisler/Bertolt Brecht, Walter Steffens (Music to Art), American Eric Salzman, Uruguay's Eduardo Fernández, and Brazil's Duo Caramuru/Baldanza.

In 2000, Stadler traveled to Albania to record the music of Aleksandër Peçi. This was the first time in history that a foreign company had gone directly to Albania to produce two albums of contemporary classical music, a landmark event in the history of this impoverished country on the Balkan Peninsula.

=== Tomato Records ===
Stadler served as Director of Artists and Repertoire at Tomato Records from 1978 to 1981 and as the company's Director of Operations/Executive Producer from 1987 until 1991. In the latter position, he supervised the company's complete reissue program (a catalogue of over 65 releases).

=== Arcadia and Concord Records ===
Stadler was Vice president/Producer of Arcadia Records from 1991 to 1994, supervising all aspects of financial, production and manufacturing matters with respect to Arcadia's recording program. As producer he traveled twice to North Korea in the 1990s, to help develop an ambitious project in close cooperation with Korean composer Isang Yun. The idea was to create an event bringing North and South Korean musicians together in a joint concert, but the project never materialized and was not revisited.

Then, from 1995 until 2000 he served as Staff Producer/Label Manager for Concord Concerto (a division of Concord Records, Inc.), overseeing all aspects of the Concerto division. In addition, he produced for other labels of the Concord Group such as Concord Jazz, Concord Picante, Jazz Alliance and The Blues Alliance.
