= Missa Latina 'Pro Pace' =

Missa Latina is a classical music composition written by the Puerto Rican composer Roberto Sierra. The work was written for SATB chorus with two soloists (a baritone and a soprano), and a symphonic orchestra. It was co-commissioned by the National Symphony Orchestra and The Choral Arts Society of Washington and was written through 2003–2005. It premiered in 2006 at Kennedy Center in Washington D.C., and was also performed in the 51st Casals Festival in Puerto Rico. The Washington Times judged it "the most significant symphonic premiere in the District since the late Benjamin Britten's stunning War Requiem was first performed in the still-unfinished Washington National Cathedral in the late 1960s."

The Missa Latina, "Pro Pace" (English: "For Peace"), has seven movements:

1. Introitus (The Entrance, Introduction; Sirach 36:18, Psalm 121:1)
2. Kyrie (Lord, have mercy)
3. Gloria (Glory)
4. Credo (Credo)
5. Offertorium (Offertory, Psalm 121:6–9)
6. Santus (Holy)
7. Agnus Dei (Lamb of God)

== Performances ==
- February 2–4, 2006, Washington, DC: National Symphony Orchestra, Choral Arts Society; Leonard Slatkin, conductor; Heidi Grant Murphy, soprano; Nathaniel Webster, baritone.
- March 3, 2007, Casals Festival, San Juan, Puerto Rico: Puerto Rico Symphony Orchestra, San Juan Philharmonic Chorale; Andreas Delfs, conductor; Heidi Grant Murphy, soprano; Nathaniel Webster, baritone.
- December 29–30, 2007, Honolulu, HI: Honolulu Symphony, Honolulu Symphony Chorus; Andreas Delfs, conductor; Olivia Gorra, soprano; Eric Owens, baritone.
- October 3–4, 2008, Milwaukee, WI: Milwaukee Symphony Orchestra, Milwaukee Symphony Chorus; Andreas Delfs, conductor; Heidi Grant Murphy, soprano; Nathaniel Webster, baritone.
- April 29, May 1 & 3, 2009, Houston Symphony Orchestra & Chorus, Leonard Slatkin, conductor; Heidi Grant Murphy, soprano; Thomas Meglioranza, baritone.
- May 31, 2009, Los Angeles Master Chorale, Grant Gershon, conductor; Heidi Grant Murphy, soprano; Daniel Teadt, baritone.
- June 12, 2011, Conspirare, Craig Hella Johnson, conductor; Heidi Grant Murphy, soprano; Daniel Teadt, baritone.
- May 15, 2016, New York Virtuoso Singers, Harold Rosenbaum, conductor; Sharla Nafzinger, soprano; Daniel Teadt, baritone.

== Recording ==
The work was recorded for commercial CD release on the Naxos label by the Milwaukee Symphony Orchestra and Chorus in October 2008. In 2009 Missa Latina was nominated for a GRAMMY for best contemporary composition.
