= San Juan Philharmonic Chorale =

The San Juan Philharmonic Chorale (Coral Filarmónica de San Juan in Spanish), is one of Puerto Rico’s top choral groups. It performs regularly with the Puerto Rico Symphony Orchestra (PRSO) and at the Casals Festival.

This critically acclaimed semi-professional group was established in 1986 by Carmen Acevedo Lucío, for a PRSO performance of Händel’s Messiah conducted by Margaret Hillis. Since then, the San Juan Philharmonic Chorale has collaborated with world-renowned conductors such as Krzysztof Penderecki, Helmuth Rilling, Gerard Schwarz, Lukas Foss, Julius Rudel, Yoav Talmi, Woldemar Nelsson, Andreas Delfs, Michael Lankester, and Eugene Kohn.

In 1990, the group collaborated with the National Symphony Orchestra under the baton of Mstislav Rostropovich for a Casals’ Festival performance of Rimsky-Korsakov’s Le Coq d’Or. The group has also shared the stage with Philadelphia’s Mendelssohn Club.

In 2007, the San Juan Philharmonic Chorale’s 20th anniversary celebration included performances with the PRSO of Roberto Sierra’s Missa Latina and Sir William Walton’s Belshazzar's Feast.

The 80-voice choir is directed by Carmen Acevedo Lucío, also music professor at the University of Puerto Rico at Río Piedras. The San Juan Philharmonic Chorale is a member of Chorus America.
