= Harold Rosenbaum =

American conductor and musician (born 1950)

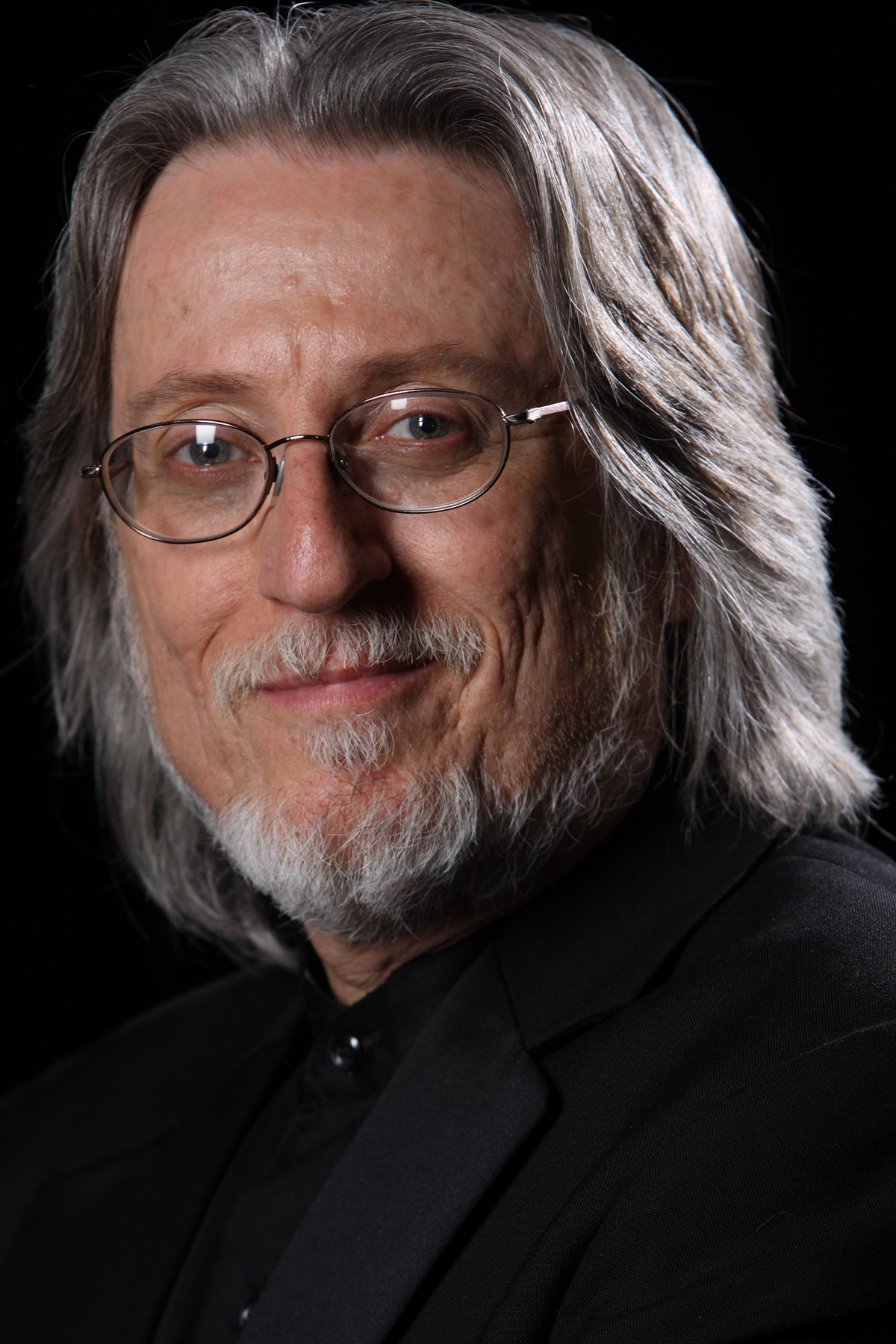

Background information
- Born: January 24, 1950 (age 76); Danville, Pennsylvania, U.S.
- Genres: choral, contemporary music, classical music
- Occupations: conductor, educator, arranger, author, lecturer, pianist, organist
- Instruments: piano, organ
- Years active: 1972–present
- Member of: New York Virtuoso Singers, Canticum Novum Singers
- Website: www.haroldrosenbaum.com

Harold Rosenbaum (born January 24, 1950) is an American conductor and musician. He is the artistic director and conductor of the New York Virtuoso Singers and the Canticum Novum Singers. The New York Virtuoso Singers appear on 48 albums on labels including Naxos Records and Sony Classical. He has collaborated extensively with many ensembles including the New York Philharmonic, Juilliard Orchestra, American Symphony Orchestra, Bang on a Can, Mark Morris Dance Group, Orchestra of Saint Luke's, Glyndebourne Festival Opera, Riverside Symphony, and Brooklyn Philharmonic.

== Biography ==
Harold Rosenbaum was born in 1950 in Danville, Pennsylvania. In 1951, his family moved to the Bronx, and then to Flushing, Queens. He began studying piano and singing in choirs at an early age. In addition to his musical talents, he had a childhood love of drawing that briefly saw him consider a career in architecture. He was especially inspired by The Lion Hunt by Peter Paul Rubens, a famous Baroque painting he meticulously copied by hand. He attended Flushing High School, graduating in 1967. In the summer before his senior year, he decided to pursue music when he was one of sixteen young singers selected for an intensive summer choral program. Until university, his musical tendencies were towards pop and folk music inspired by the famous folk trio Peter, Paul and Mary and iconic film singer Mario Lanza.

In 1967 he began attending Queens College where he developed a passion for choral music, both classical and contemporary. He was mentored by faculty members Joel Mandelbaum, Saul Novak, Paul Maynard, and others. In 1972 he graduated with a BA in vocal performance. He continued his graduate studies at Queens, earning an MA in choral conducting in 1974 and an honorary doctorate in 2011.

== Career ==
In 1973, as a graduate student at Queens College, he established his first choir, The Canticum Novum Singers, a volunteer ensemble which quickly established a significant presence in the New York City music scene. The reputation and skill of the group have led to numerous tours and choral premieres of works by composers such as Johann Christian Bach, George Benjamin, Luciano Berio, Anton Bruckner, Gabriel Fauré, John Harbison, George Frideric Handel, Ned Rorem, Peter Schickele, and Alfred Schnittke.

In 1988, building on the successes of CNS, he founded a professional choir, The New York Virtuoso Singers, which was developed from an existing group of professional singers who performed for the Brooklyn Philharmonic, where he was choirmaster. In 1993, the young group was invited to be the first-ever guest chorus at the Tanglewood Festival of Contemporary Music, returning in 2013. Rosenbaum has led NYVS in over 100 concerts, including a tour of Scandinavia. NYVS has premiered over 500 new works by notable contemporary composers, including Luciano Berio, John Harbison, Hans Werner Henze, Louis Andriessen, Shulamit Ran, George Perle, Ernst Krenek, Thea Musgrave, Jonathan Harvey, Arvo Pärt, and Andrew Imbrie.

Rosenbaum is also an active educator. He has taught at Queens College, Adelphi University, The Juilliard School and the University at Buffalo, where he led the graduate program in choral conducting and directed two vocal ensembles, UB Choir and UB Chorus.

Throughout his career, Rosenbaum has commissioned well over 100 new compositions and bringing obscure works into the public eye. To that end, he founded a recording company, Virtuoso Choral Recordings, to disseminate contemporary American choral works.

Though his primary focuses are NYVS and CNS, he has many other pursuits. He edits two series of choral music for G. Schirmer Inc. and Peermusic Classical.

From 2010 to 2013 he was the artistic director of the Society for Universal Sacred Music, which sponsored a music festival in NYC.

In 2014 he created The Harold Rosenbaum Choral Conducting Institute which sponsors annual multi-day workshops in sites such as Columbia University, Wesleyan University, New York University, Adelphi University, Brandeis University, The University at Utah, and the University at Buffalo.

In 2015 he created "ChoralFest USA – A Celebration of the Diversity of Choral Music in America", an annual marathon concert in NYC designed to showcase talented choral ensembles.

His New York Virtuoso Singers also appeared on the Late Show with David Letterman on Millennium New Year's Eve, performing the finale of Beethoven's 9th Symphony with the Brooklyn Philharmonic.

He has taken choirs on 29 trips to Europe, including participation in the Ludlow Festival, the Siracusa Festival, and the Cheltenham Fringe Festival.

He also participates in the Bach in the Subways classical music awareness campaign, conducting Bach in public spaces.

=== Collaborations ===
Over the years, Rosenbaum has worked with an eclectic group of major artists, among them Robert Spano, David Lang, David Del Tredici, Stephen Schwartz, Charles Wuorinen, Sir Charles Mackerras, Lukas Foss, Thea Musgrave, John Corigliano, Shulamit Ran, Julia Wolfe, James Conlon, Dennis Russell Davies, Leon Botstein, Michael York, Sir Jonathan Miller, Elliott Carter, and Milton Babbitt.

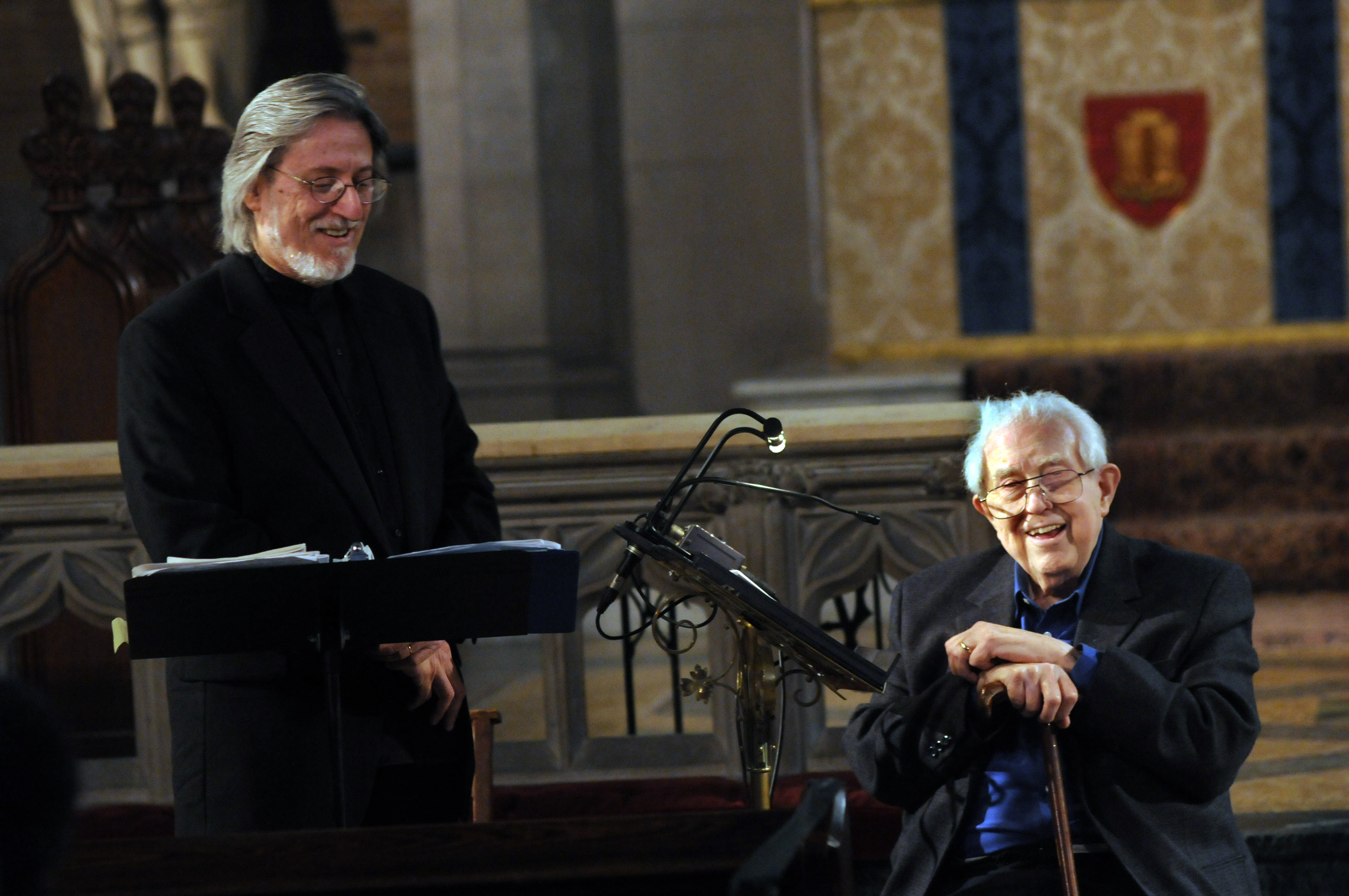
Rosenbaum with Elliott Carter

He has performed in concerts with Bang on a Can, Glyndebourne Festival Opera, New York Philharmonic, Juilliard Orchestra, American Symphony Orchestra, Riverside Symphony, Chamber Music Society of Lincoln Center, Tony Bennett, Leonard Slatkin, Marianne Faithfull, James Galway, Licia Albanese, Concerto Köln, Bard Festival Orchestra, American Composers Orchestra, Da Capo Chamber Players, S.E.M. Ensemble, Continuum, Paul Taylor Dance Company, New York Youth Symphony, and the Brooklyn Philharmonic (59 times) and many others.

In 2007 Rosenbaum collaborated with Ennio Morricone and the Orchestra Roma Sinfonietta in concerts performed at the United Nations Headquarters and Radio City Music Hall

In 2012 he conducted Haydn's 'The Creation' in Carnegie Hall with the Orchestra of Saint Luke's.

In 2016, Rosenbaum conducted Roberto Sierra's Missa Latina in a new arrangement he commissioned for choir, soloists, 24 percussion instruments and two pianos.

=== Selected awards ===
- 2014 Columbia University Ditson Conductor's Award
- 2014 ASCAP/Chorus America Adventuresome Programming Award
- 2010 ASCAP Victor Herbert Award
- 2008 American Composers Alliance Laurel Leaf Award

=== Selected discography ===
Year	Title	Artist(s)	Label
1991	To Orpheus	The New York Virtuoso Singers	
1998	Music of Leo Kraft	The New York Virtuoso Singers	CRI
2001	Eleanor Cory: Of Mere Being	The New York Virtuoso Singers	
2004	Charles Wuorinen: Genesis	The New York Virtuoso Singers	Koch Records, Albany Records
2004	Thea Musgrave: Choral Works	The New York Virtuoso Singers	Bridge Records
2009	David Felder: Boxman	The New York Virtuoso Singers, Arditti Quartet, New York New Music Ensemble	Albany Records
2011	In The Divine Image – Universal Sacred Music Vol. 1	The New York Virtuoso Singers, The SUSM Festival Players	Soundbrush Records
2011	Toward Lasting Peace – Universal Sacred Music Vol. 2	The New York Virtuoso Singers	Soundbrush Records
2012	With Peace in Mind	The New York Virtuoso Singers	MSR Classics
2013	25x25: Twenty-Five Premieres for Twenty-Five Years	The New York Virtuoso Singers	Soundbrush Records
2013	Voices of Earth and Air	The New York Virtuoso Singers	Navona Records
2014	Orpheus Lex	The New York Virtuoso Singers, The Artemis Chamber Ensemble	Ravello Records
2014	Tetrahedron Dreams	The New York Virtuoso Singers	Navona Records
2014	Fine Music, Vol. 5	The New York Virtuoso Singers	
2014	Unity & The Unexcelled Mantra	The New York Virtuoso Singers	
2015	Universal Sacred Music for Chorus	The New York Virtuoso Singers	
2015	Milken Archive Digital, Vol. 2 Album 5: A Garden Eastward – Sephardi & Near Eastern Inspiration	The New York Virtuoso Singers	
2016	The Four Cycles	The New York Virtuoso Singers	Naxos Records

== Personal life ==
He resides in Westchester County, New York with his wife Edie. He has two daughters and three grandsons.
