= Hugh Wolff =

American conductor (born 1953)

Hugh MacPherson Wolff (born October 21, 1953, Neuilly-sur-Seine, France) is an American conductor. He was chief conductor of the Frankfurt Radio Symphony.

== Biography ==
Born in France while his father was serving in the U.S. Foreign Service, Wolff spent his primary-school years in London. He received his higher education at Harvard and Peabody Conservatory. Between Harvard and Peabody, he spent a year in Paris where he studied composition with Olivier Messiaen and conducting with Charles Bruck. At Peabody, he studied piano with Leon Fleisher.

Wolff began his career in 1979 as assistant conductor to Mstislav Rostropovich at the National Symphony Orchestra, in Washington, D.C. In June 1985, he was the first winner of the Seaver/National Endowment for the Arts Conductors Award. He was music director of the Northeastern Pennsylvania Philharmonic from 1981 to 1986. Wolff then served as music director of the New Jersey Symphony Orchestra from 1986 to 1993. From 1988 until 1992, Wolff was principal conductor of the Saint Paul Chamber Orchestra and then served as its music director from 1992 to 2000. He was principal conductor of the Grant Park Music Festival from 1994 until 1997. In 1998, Wolff led the American Russian Young Artists Orchestra on their world tour.

Hector Berlioz: Symphonie fantastique, second movement, excerpt from a 2000 recording with the Frankfurt Radio Symphony

In Europe, Wolff was chief conductor of the Frankfurt Radio Symphony from 1997 to 2006. In September 2017, he became chief conductor of the Belgian National Orchestra. He is scheduled to stand down as chief conductor of the Belgian National Orchestra at the end of the 2021–2022 season, and subsequently to take the title of dirigent emeritus (conductor emeritus) for two seasons.

Wolff has recorded extensively for Teldec, Sony and others, has been nominated three times for a Grammy and has twice won the Cannes Classical Award. His discography includes the complete Beethoven symphonies with the Frankfurt Radio Orchestra. As a conductor he has accompanied recordings by Rostropovich, Yo-Yo Ma, Joshua Bell, Hilary Hahn, Jean-Yves Thibaudet, Dawn Upshaw, Thomas Hampson, Jennifer Larmore, and jazz guitarist John Scofield. Wolff is director of orchestras and teaches orchestral conducting at the New England Conservatory of Music in Boston, Massachusetts.

Wolff lives in Boston with his wife, the harpist and author Judith Kogan. They have three sons.

Cultural offices
| Preceded by Thomas Michalak | Music Director, Northeastern Pennsylvania Philharmonic; 1981–1986 | Succeeded by Hugh Keelan |
| Preceded by Thomas Michalak | Music Director, New Jersey Symphony Orchestra; 1985–1993 | Succeeded by Zdeněk Mácal |
| Preceded by Christopher Hogwood | Music Director, Saint Paul Chamber Orchestra; 1992–2000 | Succeeded by Andreas Delfs |
