= Laurel Leaf Award =

Annual American classical music award (1951–2012)

The Laurel Leaf Award recognizes the achievement of an individual or group in encouraging and fostering American music. The award has been presented annually by the American Composers Alliance, from 1951 through at least 2012. Past recipients of the award include the Juilliard String Quartet, the American Music Center, Leonard Slatkin, Minnesota Composers Forum (now known as American Composers Forum), Harold Rosenbaum, and Speculum Musicae.
