= Zdeněk Mácal =

Czech conductor (1936–2023)

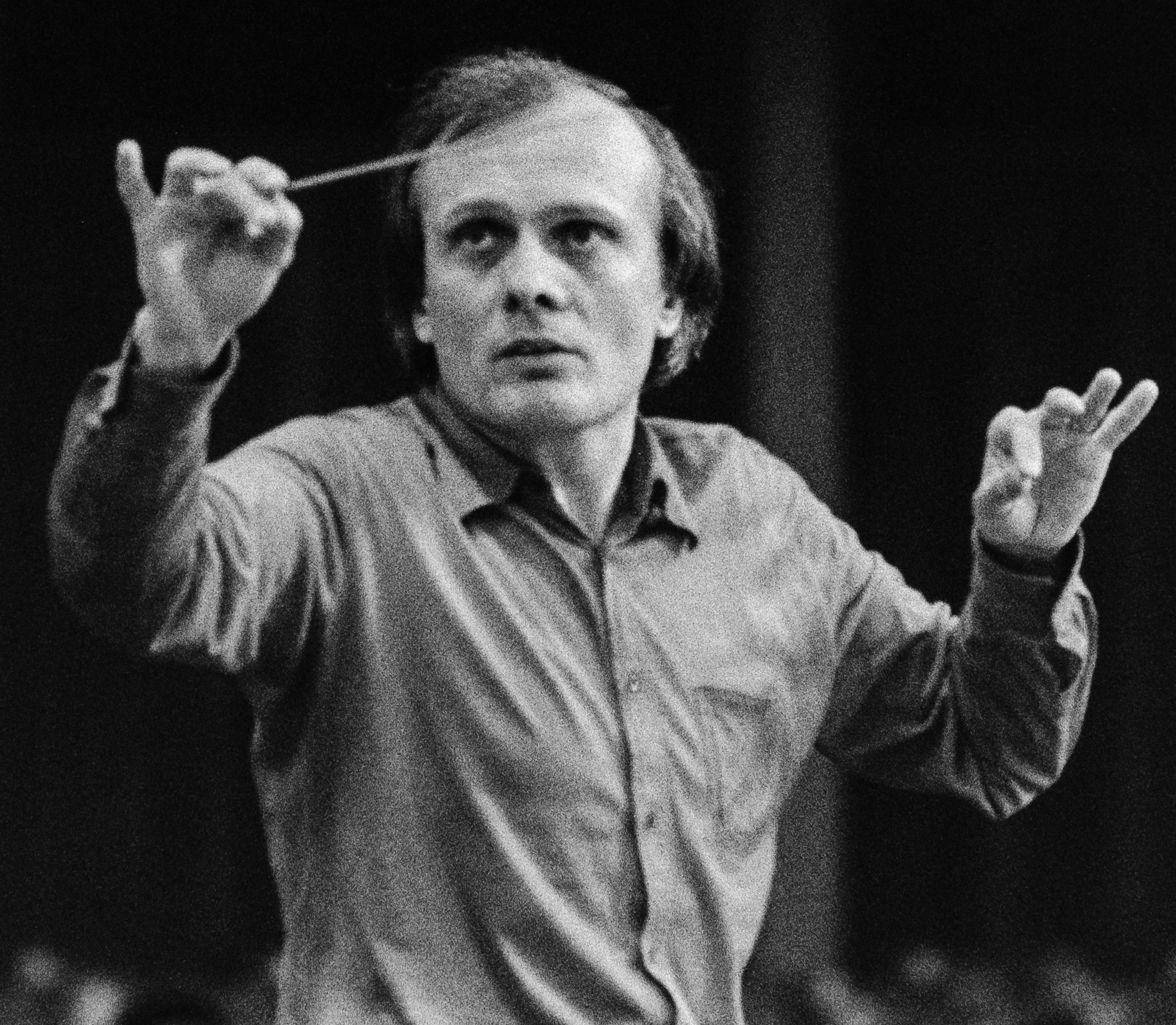
- Mácal conducting the Bamberger Symphoniker in 1982
- Born: 8 January 1936; Brno, Czechoslovakia
- Died: 25 October 2023 (aged 87); Prague, Czech Republic
- Education: Brno Conservatory; Janáček Academy of Music and Performing Arts
- Occupation: Conductor
- Organizations: Prague Symphony Orchestra; WDR Symphony Orchestra Cologne; Milwaukee Symphony Orchestra; New Jersey Symphony Orchestra; Czech Philharmonic

Zdeněk Mácal (Czech: [ˈzdɛɲɛk ˈmaːtsal]; 8 January 1936 – 25 October 2023) was a Czech conductor who worked internationally. The promising conductor who had won international competitions left his home country of Czechoslovakia in 1968 when the Warsaw Pact ended the Prague Spring, to return only after communism ended there. He was chief conductor of the WDR Symphony Orchestra Cologne from 1970, the NDR Orchestra of Hanover, the Sydney Symphony Orchestra in 1986, then the Milwaukee Symphony Orchestra until 1995, the New Jersey Symphony Orchestra from 1993, and finally the Czech Philharmonic from 2003 to 2007. He conducted all major orchestras of the world and was prolific in recording. One focus of his broad repertoire was Czech music, including contemporary music.

== Biography ==
Mácal was born in Brno on 8 January 1936 and began violin lessons with his father at the age of four. He later attended the Brno Conservatory and the Janáček Academy of Music and Performing Arts, where he graduated in 1960 with top honors. He became the principal conductor of the Prague Symphony Orchestra and conducted both symphonic concerts and operas. He won the 1965 International Conducting Competition in Besançon, France, and the 1966 Dimitri Mitropoulos International Music Competition in New York City, under the direction of Leonard Bernstein. Leaving behind a promising career in Czechoslovakia, he left the country after the Soviet-led invasion of 1968 crushed the Prague Spring, with his wife and daughter.

He was invited to conduct the Bavarian Radio Symphony Orchestra where Rafael Kubelík was chief conductor, who asked the younger colleague to conduct contemporary music including the world premiere of the Eighth Symphony by Jan Kapr. He made his successful London debut at the Royal Festival Hall in February 1969 with the Bournemouth Symphony Orchestra as a late replacement for Constantin Silvestri. The concert included a performance of Richard Strauss' Don Quixote, with cellist Paul Tortelier and violist Mary Samuel. His first post as chief conductor in the West was in 1970 the WDR Symphony Orchestra Cologne for four years, followed by the NDR Orchestra of Hanover.

Mácal made his American debut with the Chicago Symphony Orchestra in 1972. He served as artistic advisor of the San Antonio Symphony and principal conductor of Chicago's Grant Park Music Festival. He conducted more than 160 orchestras during his career.

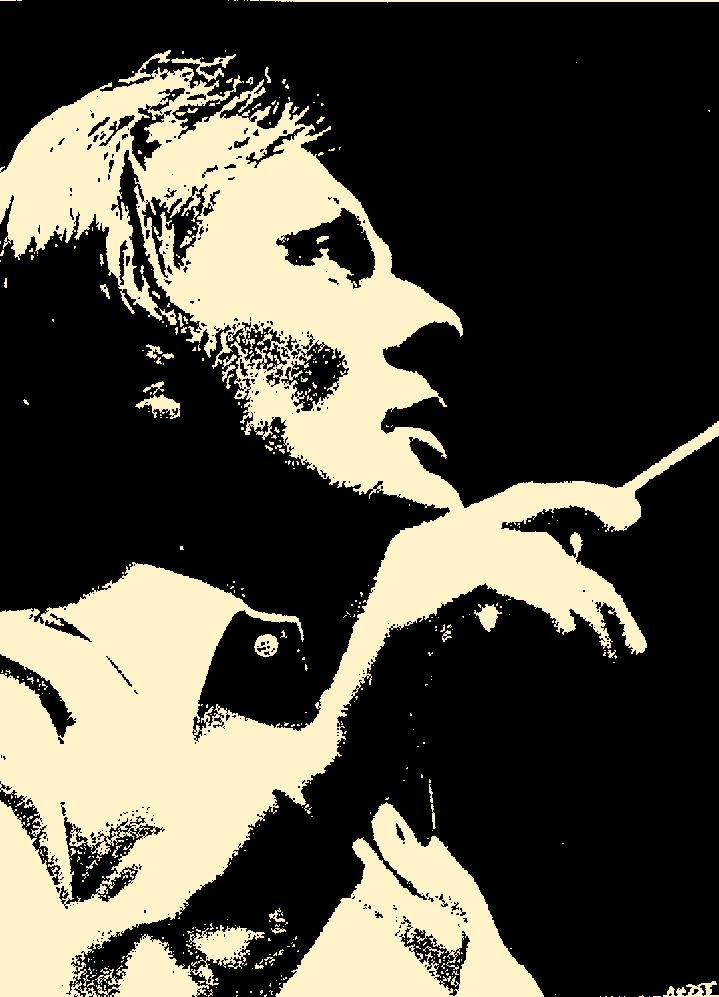
Publicity photo, 1977

Mácal was appointed chief conductor of the Sydney Symphony Orchestra for a three-year contract, beginning with the 1986 season. The Australian Broadcasting Corporation had agreed at the outset to adjust Mácal's fee so that he would not be adversely affected by the fluctuating Australian dollar, or in his tax arrangements, and any loss would be borne by the ABC. Shortly after taking up his appointment in March 1986, he asked to be released from his contract from the end of the first year, and this was agreed to. But in July 1986, with five concerts of his first season still to come, he left the country without explanation or even informing the ABC.

Mácal became music director of the Milwaukee Symphony Orchestra in 1986. He took that orchestra on an East Coast tour in 1989, which included performances at the Kennedy Center in Washington, D.C. and Carnegie Hall in New York City. They also toured Japan in 1992. He made a popular recording of Smetana's Má vlast for Telarc Records in 1991. He conducted new music by Roberto Sierra for three years of him as composer in residence. The orchestra played many symphonies and tone poems by Antonín Dvořák during his tenure.

Mácal became music director of the New Jersey Symphony Orchestra (NJSO) in September 1993 concurrently to Milwaukee which he left in 1995. He recorded with them nearly all the symphonic works by Dvořák, including his Stabat Mater in 1994. He conducted the world premieres of six commissions, and twelve New Jersey premieres. On 19 October 1997, he led the concert for the opening of the New Jersey Performing Arts Center. In 1995, he made Dolby Surround recordings of Reinhold Glière's Second Symphony in C minor and the suite from his ballet The Red Poppy. He concluded his NJSO tenure in 2002 and took on an emeritus title with the orchestra subsequently.

After the end of the communist regime in his home country, he was able to return there. In 2003, Mácal was appointed chief conductor of the Czech Philharmonic. Although his contract with the orchestra was through 2008, he suddenly resigned in September 2007.

In 2006, Mácal made a brief appearance in the Japanese drama series Nodame Cantabile, based on the manga by Tomoko Ninomiya. He played the main character's childhood mentor, conductor Sebastiano Vieira.

Mácal died in a Prague hospital on 25 October 2023, at age 87.

Cultural offices
Preceded by Christoph von Dohnányi	Chief Conductor, WDR Symphony Orchestra Cologne; 1970–1974	Succeeded by Hiroshi Wakasugi
Preceded by Lukas Foss	Music Director, Milwaukee Symphony Orchestra; 1986–1995	Succeeded by Andreas Delfs
Preceded by Hugh Wolff	Music Director, New Jersey Symphony Orchestra; 1993–2002	Succeeded by Neeme Järvi
