= Anatoli Krastev =

Bulgarian cellist (born 1947)

- Born: September 6, 1947 (age 78)
- Genres: Classical
- Website: www.cellist.nl

Anatoli Dobrev Krastev (Bulgarian: Анатоли Добрев Кръ̀стев; born September 6, 1947) is a prominent Bulgarian cellist and pedagogue. He is widely considered to be one of the most important Bulgarian performers. Since 2008, he has been Vice-rector of the National Academy of Music Pancho Vladigerov in Sofia.

== Biography ==
Krastev graduated from the National Conservatory in Tunis in the cello class of professor Gvido Evraet, and from the National Academy of Music Pancho Vladigerov in Sofia, in the cello class of Professor Velko Karastoyanov. Subsequently, he specialized with the Hungarian cellist professor János Starker, the French professor André Navarra as well as with Professor Zdravko Yordanov. Since 1972 he has been a teacher at the National Academy of Music Pancho Vladigerov, from 1989 as Assistant professor and since 1995 as Professor.

Kratsev is Honorary President of the Academy for Young Talents in Marseille. He is a permanent soloist with several Bulgarian, European and American orchestras as well as leader of masterclasses im Europe, the US, and Brasil.

== Recordings ==
He recorded on CD the cello concertos by Camille Saint-Saëns, Robert Schumann, the Variations on a Rococo Theme by Pyotr Ilyich Tchaikovsky, and music by Bulgarian composers such as Petar Hristoskov, Milcho Leviev, Emil Tabakov, and Gheorghi Arnaoudov. A CD release by St.Clair - Classics Collection "Forever Gold" features Anatoli Krastev as soloist in Dvořák's Cello Concerto together with Andre Navarra's recording of the Edward Elgar cello concerto.
