= Angela Tosheva =

Bulgarian musician (born 1961)

Angela Tosheva Tosheva (Bulgarian: Анжела Тошева Тошева; born 15 June 1961) is a Bulgarian pianist, chamber musician, piano and chamber music pedagogue and editor. She is co-director of Orange Factory psychoacoustic arts and music publishing house with Michail Goleminov.

== Biography ==
=== Early life and education ===
Born in Sofia, Tosheva graduated from the Sofia Academy of Music in 1984. A milestone in her development was meeting Gyorgy Sebok on his summer master classes in Hungary and Switzerland. She has also studied with Ketil Haugsand.

In 1991, Tosheva defended her doctoral degree on "The Theory of interpretation in chamber music", on which she worked for five years, while teaching chamber music at the Academy of Music in Sofia as an assistant to Prof. Dimitar Kozev.

=== As a performer ===
As a performer, she has had numerous solo and chamber music concerts in Bulgaria, with music ranging from William Byrd and Couperin to Ligeti and Adams and with Bulgarian contemporary composers such as Lazar Nikolov, Konstantin Iliev, Ivan Spassov, Vassil Kazandjiev, Michail Goleminov, Georgi Arnaoudov, making her a major promoter of contemporary music in Bulgaria.

"A rare mixture of rigor and flexibility are typical and essential for her performance. Her music is the result of a deep and vibrant 'Slavonic' sound, serving a pure, clear-sighted vision."

Abroad, she has performed in the USA, Canada, Brazil, Portugal, Ireland, Norway, France, Italy, Russia, Turkey. She led an international master class in Bordeaux, France, in 1996. In 1997, she was invited by the São Paulo University Music Department to render a seminar on contemporary music and Béla Bartók's works for piano, as well as to perform twelve concerts for contemporary and classical music.

=== As an editor ===
As an editor with Michail Goleminov, celebrating the bicentenary of the births of Chopin and Schumann, Orange Factory has released in Bulgarian Regard Sur Chopin, ed. Fayard (Поглед към Шопен, ed. Orange Factory) and Schumann, ed. Seuil (Шуман, ed. Orange Factory) by André Boucourechliev (translated in Bulgarian by Pavlina Ribarova and Zornitsa Kitinska).

=== Prizes ===
Prizes she has received include first prize at the international competition in Salerno 1978, the Usti and Labem Award at the age of 12, first prize at the Bulgarian Liszt-Bartók Competition in 1988. She has been awarded the "Golden Feather" award from Classic FM Sofia radio, 1997, the award of the Polish Institute in Sofia for the 2010 Chopin year, 2010, the award of the Bulgarian "Salon of Arts" together with Michail Goleminov for his multimedia installation "Schuman-Oracle" and her concerts promoting Schumann's bicentenary, 2010.

== Other activities ==
In 2003, she and the composer Michail Goleminov founded The Orange Factory Psychoacoustic Arts, an experimental music and multimedia studio and publishing house in Sofia, Bulgaria.

Tosheva has been living since 2001 as a freelance artist.

== Discography ==
| Title | Composer/Compilation | Producer | Artist |
|---|---|---|---|
| "Empire of Light" | Georgi Arnaoudov | Concord Records, CA | Angela Tosheva |
| "Three piano sonatas" | Lazar Nikolov | Labour Records, NY | Angela Tosheva |
| "16 keyboard sonatas" | Domenico Scarlatti | Orange Factory | Angela Tosheva |
| "Piano works" | Béla Bartók | Orange Factory | Angela Tosheva |
| "Etudes" | Scriabin, Debussy and Ligeti | Orange Factory | Angela Tosheva |
| "Preludes and piano works" | Sergei Rachmaninoff, Michail Goleminov | Orange Factory | Angela Tosheva |
| "Contemporary Dutch piano music" | contemporary Dutch composers | Orange Factory | Angela Tosheva |
| "Passion" | popular classical music | Arcadia Records | Kayla Suh (violin), Angela Tosheva |
