= Kurt Masur =

German conductor (1927–2015)

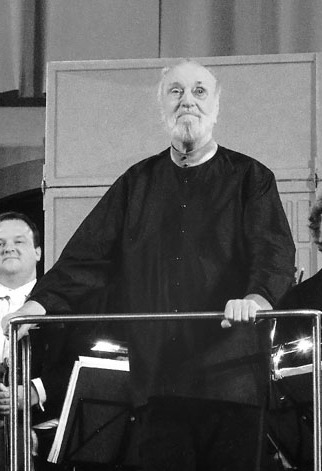
- Masur conducting the Dresdner Philharmonie (Dresden) in 2012
- Born: 18 July 1927; Brieg, Free State of Prussia, Germany
- Died: 19 December 2015 (aged 88); Greenwich, Connecticut, U.S.
- Burial place: Südfriedhof (Leipzig), Germany
- Education: University of Music and Theatre Leipzig
- Occupation: Conductor
- Years active: 1955–2014
- Organizations: Dresden Philharmonic; Leipzig Gewandhaus Orchestra; New York Philharmonic; London Philharmonic Orchestra; Orchestre National de France
- Style: Western classical music
- Spouses: Brigitte Stütze (div. 1966) Irmgard Elsa Kaul (died 1972) Tomoko Sakurai (m. 1975)
- Children: 5

Kurt Masur (German pronunciation: [ˈkʊʁt maˈzuːɐ̯]; 18 July 1927 – 19 December 2015) was a German conductor. Called "one of the last old-style maestros", he directed many of the principal orchestras of his era. He had a long career as the Kapellmeister of the Leipzig Gewandhaus Orchestra, and also served as music director of the New York Philharmonic for about ten years. He made many recordings of classical music with major orchestras. Masur is also remembered for his actions to support peaceful demonstrations against the East German government in the 1989 demonstrations in Leipzig; those protests were part of the events leading up to the fall of the Berlin wall.

== Biography ==
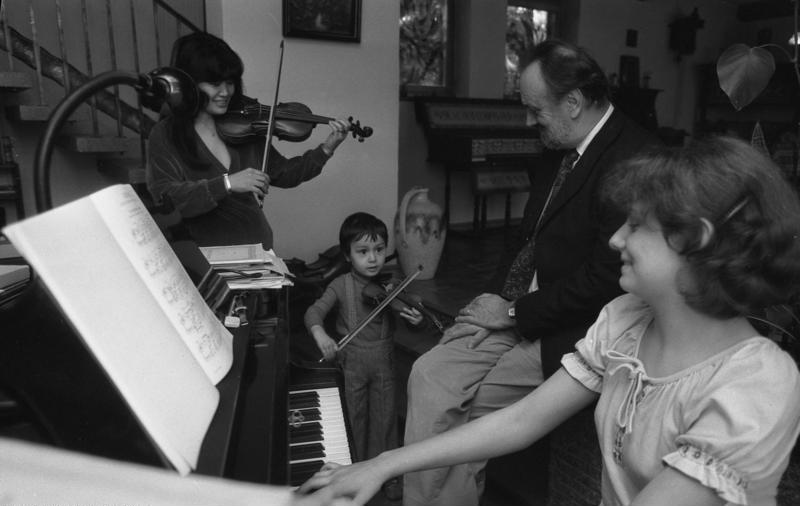
Masur, wife Tomoko, daughter Carolin, and son Ken David in 1981

Masur was born in Brieg, Lower Silesia, Germany (now Brzeg, Poland), and studied piano, composition and conducting in Leipzig, Saxony. His father was an electrical engineer, and as a young boy he completed an electrician's apprenticeship; he occasionally worked in his father's shop. From ages 10 to 16, he took piano lessons with Katharina Hartmann.

In October 1944, the Nazis announced that all men between the ages of 16 and 60 could be conscripted, which included the young conductor. Masur was drafted into the paratroopers late in 1944. He was sent to fight; "out of the 150 people of his unit, only 27 survived", before being captured by American and British forces on 1 May 1945. Masur and his family were lucky: not a single family member died in the war.

From 1946 until 1948, he studied conducting, composition and piano at the University of Music and Theatre Leipzig. He left at 21, never finishing his studies, when offered a job as répétiteur at the Landestheater Halle an der Saale (since renamed the Halle Opera House, or Opernhaus Halle in German).

Masur was married three times, and had a total of five children. His first marriage to Brigitte Stütze produced three children, and ended in divorce in 1966. He and his second wife, Irmgard Elsa Kaul, had a daughter, Carolin Masur, who became an opera singer. Irmgard died in 1972 in a car accident in which Masur was severely injured. In 1975, he married his third wife, soprano and violist, Tomoko Sakurai: they had one son, Ken-David, a classical singer and conductor.

== Conducting career ==
Masur conducted the Dresden Philharmonic for three years ending in 1958 and again from 1967 to 1972. He also worked with the Komische Oper of East Berlin. In 1970, he became Kapellmeister of the Gewandhausorchester Leipzig, serving in that post until 1996. With that orchestra, he performed Beethoven's Ninth Symphony at the celebration of German reunification in 1990.

In 1991, Masur became music director of the New York Philharmonic (NYP). He was an unexpected choice who brought change to that orchestra at a time when its reputation had declined. "Masur's appointment was a clear signal that it was time for the orchestra to begin anew." Former concertmaster Glenn Dicterow said in 2012 "It takes a big personality to unite 105 players onstage — to get everybody to be as inspired as he is — and, uh, it's hard work, . . And he's just so demanding and intense that I think that he got, just by his sheer intensity of his personality, I think it sort of transformed most of us." Masur directed the philharmonic in a performance of Brahms's Ein deutsches Requiem in the aftermath of the terrorist attacks on 11 September 2001. During his tenure, there were reports of tension between Masur and the NYP's executive director at the time, Deborah Borda, which eventually contributed to his contract not being renewed beyond 2002. In a television interview with Charlie Rose, Masur stated that regarding his leaving the NYP, "it was not my wish". Masur stood down as the NYP's music director in 2002 and was named its music director emeritus, a new title created for him. The critical consensus was that Masur improved the playing of the orchestra over his tenure.

In 2000, Masur became principal conductor of the London Philharmonic Orchestra (LPO) and held this position until 2007. In April 2002, Masur became music director of the Orchestre National de France (ONF) and served in this post until 2008, when he took the title of honorary music director of the ONF. On his 80th birthday, 18 July 2007, Masur conducted musicians from both orchestras at a Proms concert in London. Masur held the lifetime title of Honorary Guest Conductor of the Israel Philharmonic Orchestra. In 2012, following a series of cancellations of concert engagements, Masur disclosed on his website that he had Parkinson's disease.

== Students ==
His students include Kahchun Wong, Cornelius Meister, Ivo Hentschel, Matthias Manasi and Adrian Prabava.

== Political views ==
Although Masur spent most of his professional career in East Germany, he never joined the SED. In 1982, he received the National Prize of East Germany. His attitude to the regime began to change in 1989, after the arrest of a street musician in Leipzig. On 9 October 1989, he intervened in anti-government demonstrations in Leipzig in communist East Germany, negotiating an end to a confrontation that could have resulted in security forces attacking the protesters, one month before the fall of the Berlin wall.

== Death ==
In 2015, Masur died at the age of 88 in Greenwich, Connecticut, from complications of Parkinson's disease. His funeral was held in the Thomaskirche in Leipzig, with music played by the Leipzig Gewandhaus Orchestra and the Thomanerchor. Burial took place in Leipzig's South Cemetery. He was survived by his third wife, as well as his daughters Angelika and Carolin, his sons, Ken-David, Michael and Matthias, and nine grandchildren.

== Awards ==
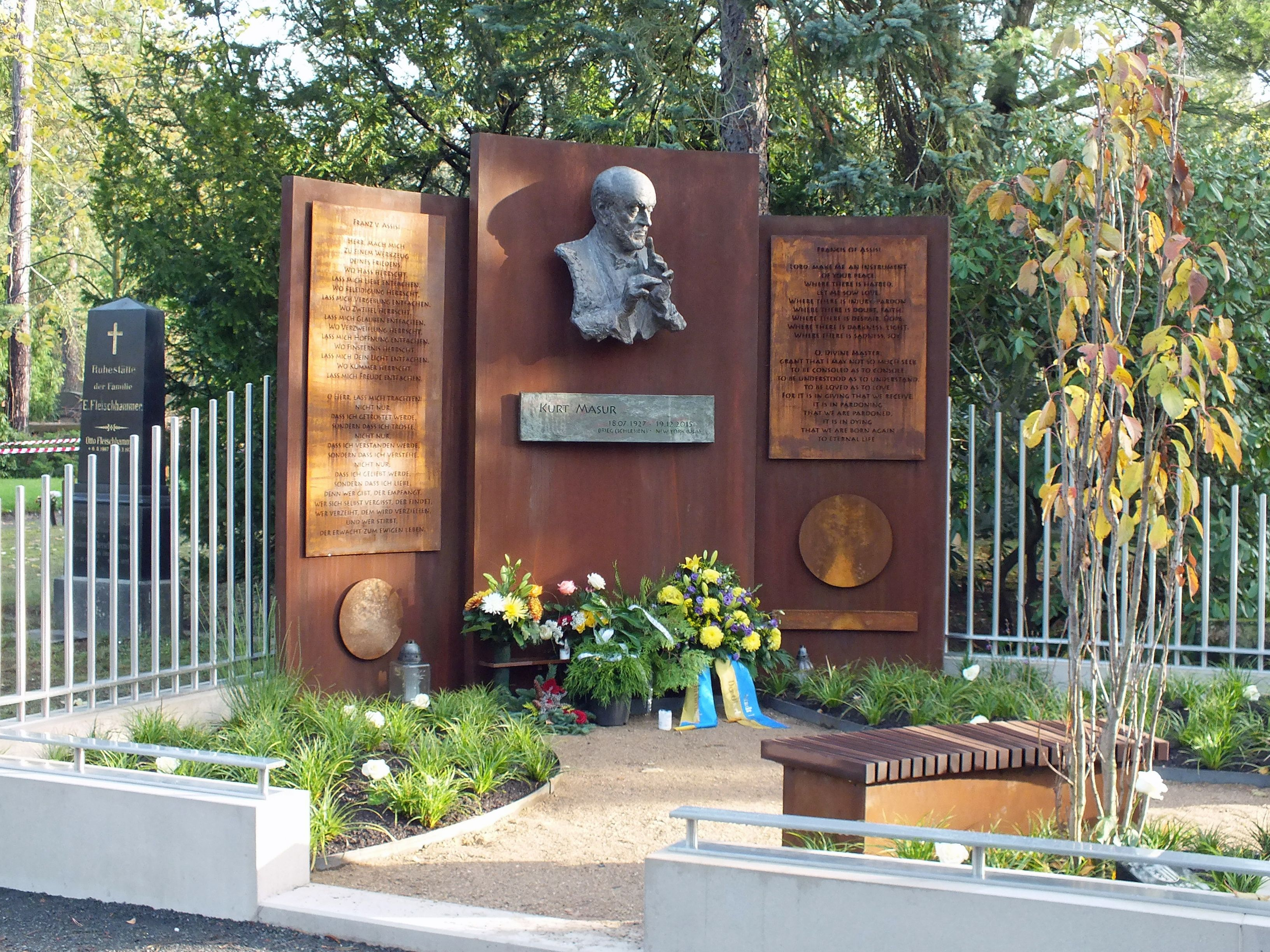
Kurt Masur burial site in Südfriedhof (Leipzig) External audio: You may hear the Gewandhaus Orchestra led by Kurt Masur performing Mendelssohn's Symphonies: No. 1 in C minor, Op.11; No. 2 in B flat, Op. 52 "Hymn of Praise"; No. 3 in A minor, Op. 56, "Scottish"; No. 4 in A major, Op. 90 "Italian"; No. 5 in D Minor, Op. 107 "Reformation"; Here on Archive.org

A professor at the Leipzig Academy of Music beginning in 1975, Masur received numerous honors. He received the Cross of the Order of Merit of the Federal Republic of Germany in 1995, and the Gold Medal of Honor for Music from the National Arts Club in 1996. In 1997, he was made a Commander of the Legion of Honor by the French government, as well as becoming a New York City Cultural Ambassador. In 1999, he received the Commander Cross of Merit of the Polish Republic.

In 2002, President of Germany Johannes Rau awarded him the Cross with Star of the Order of Merit of the Federal Republic of Germany; in 2007, President of Germany Horst Köhler bestowed upon him the Grand Cross of the Order of Merit with Star and Ribbon; in 2008, he received the Wilhelm Furtwängler Prize in Bonn, Germany. Masur was also made an honorary citizen by his hometown, Brieg. In 2001, Masur became an honorary member of the Royal Academy of Music.

In 2010, he received the Leo Baeck Medal (Leo Baeck Institute) for his humanitarian work promoting tolerance and social justice. He received a Goldene Henne Award in 2014 for his work in public policy.

On 18 July 2018, which would have been Masur's 91st birthday, Google featured him in a Google Doodle in the United States, Germany, Belarus, Iceland, and Japan.
