= Ken-David Masur =

German-born American conductor (born 1977)

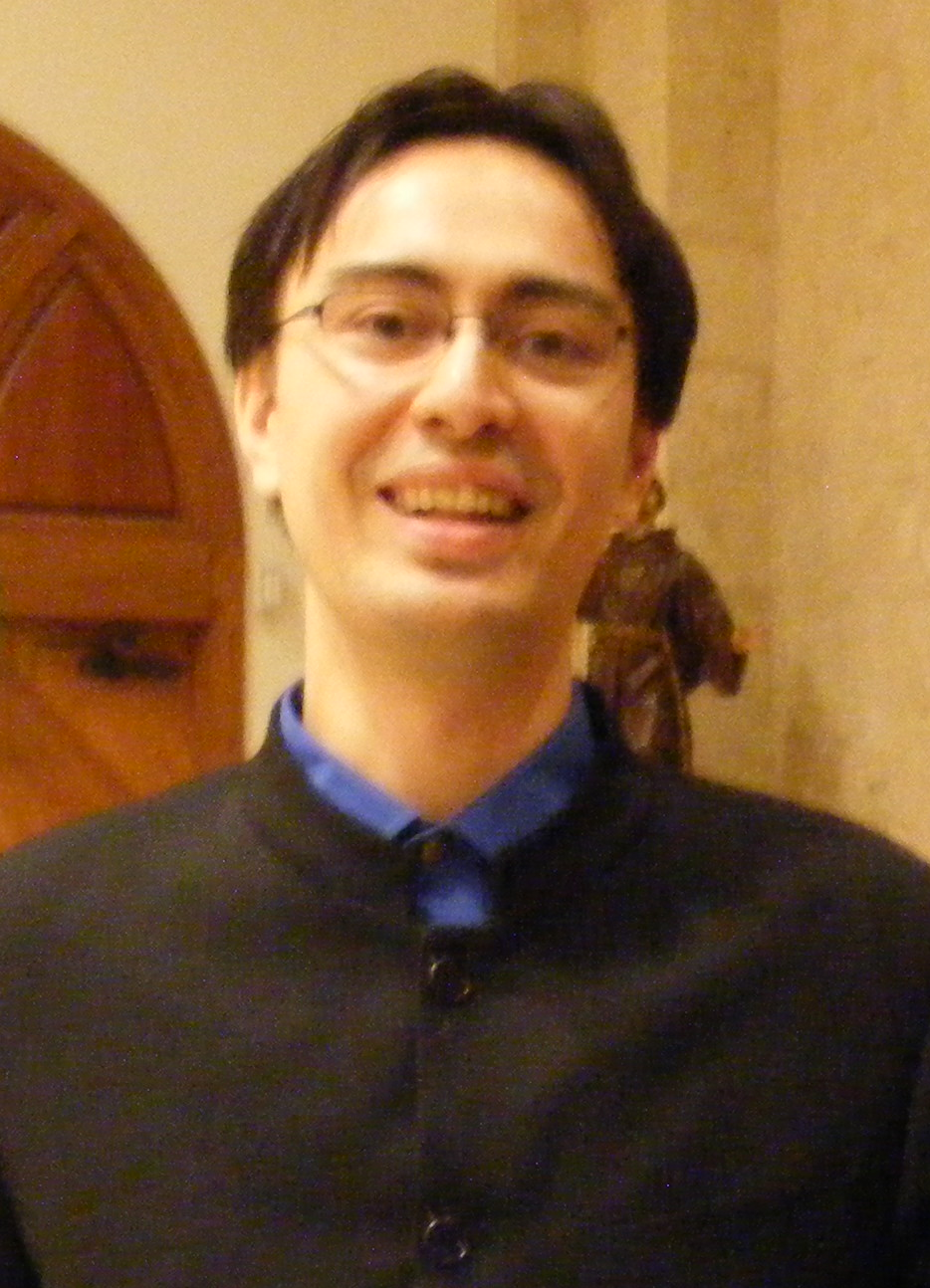
Ken-David Masur in 2009

Ken-David Masur (born 1977) is a German-born American conductor. He graduated from Columbia University in 2002. From 2018 to 2026, he was a conductor at the Milwaukee Symphony Orchestra until the MSO announced that Masur was to conclude his tenure as its music director at the close of the 2025-2026 season.

== Biography ==
Born in Leipzig of Japanese and German ancestry, Masur is the son of conductor Kurt Masur and Masur's third wife, the soprano Tomoko Sakurai. He began piano studies at age 6. Masur was also a boy soprano, and sang with the Gewandhaus Children's Choir at age 9. He later obtained a formal vocal education at the Hanns Eisler Conservatory in Berlin, where his teachers included Thomas Quasthoff. During his father's tenure with the New York Philharmonic, Masur attended the Music Conservatory of Westchester, where he studied trumpet. He subsequently attended Columbia University, where he established the Bach Society Orchestra and Chorus, and served as its first music director from 1999 to 2002. He graduated from Columbia in 2002.

In Europe, Masur was an assistant conductor with the Orchestre National de France from 2004 to 2006. He became principal guest conductor of the Munich Symphony Orchestra in 2011. In the US, Masur was resident conductor of the San Antonio Symphony from 2007 to 2011. In 2011, he became an assistant conductor at the San Diego Symphony. He was a conducting fellow at the Tanglewood Festival in 2011, and made his conducting debut with the Boston Symphony Orchestra at Tanglewood in July 2012, in a program where he and his father shared conducting duties. He later became assistant conductor of the Boston Symphony Orchestra as of the 2014–2015 season, and later took on the title of associate conductor of the orchestra.

In May 2018, Masur first guest-conducted the Milwaukee Symphony Orchestra (MSO). The MSO immediately re-engaged him for a second guest-conducting appearance in September 2018. On the basis of these concerts, in November 2018, the MSO announced the appointment of Masur as its next music director, effective with the 2019–2020 season, with an initial contract of 4 seasons. This appointment marks Masur's first music directorship. He took the title of MSO music director-designate with immediate effect. With his appointment to the MSO, Masur stood down from his Boston post. In June 2019, the Chicago Symphony Orchestra announced the appointment of Masur as the next principal conductor of the Civic Orchestra of Chicago, effective with the 2019–2020 season. In the wake of the COVID-19 pandemic, the MSO extended the initial duration of Masur's tenure first contract as music director through the 2023-2024 season. In November 2023, the MSO announced an extension of Masur's contract as its music director through the 2025-2026 season. In October 2024, the MSO announced that Masur is to conclude his tenure as its music director at the close of the 2025-2026 season.

Masur is married to the pianist Melinda Lee Masur. They founded the Chelsea Music Festival and serve as its artistic directors. They have three children.

Cultural offices
Preceded by Edo de Waart	Music Director, Milwaukee Symphony Orchestra; 2019–2026	Succeeded by Vacant
Preceded by Cliff Colnot	Principal Conductor, Civic Orchestra of Chicago; 2019–present	Succeeded by Incumbent
