= Concierto Barroco =

2007 composition by Gheorghi Arnaoudov

Concierto Barroco is a composition for violin and orchestra written in 2007 by the Bulgarian composer Gheorghi Arnaoudov. The work was inspired by the novel Concierto barroco by the Cuban writer Alejo Carpentier.

== Composition ==
The composition draws inspiration from Alejo Carpentier's novel, which imagines a fictional encounter in eighteenth-century Venice between composers Antonio Vivaldi, George Frideric Handel and Domenico Scarlatti.

Arnaoudov combines references to Baroque music with contemporary compositional techniques and sonorities.

== Performance and recording ==
The work received its premiere performance in Estoril, Portugal, in 2007.

For the first recording of the composition in 2011, Arnaoudov added specially written cadenzas for violinist Mario Hossen. The recording was made with the Orpheus Academy Orchestra of New Bulgarian University under the direction of Nayden Todorov.
