= Michail Goleminov =

Bulgarian musician (1956–2022)

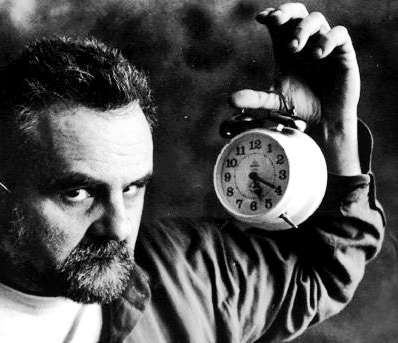

Michail Marinov Goleminov (Bulgarian: Михаил Маринов Големинов) (2 June 1956 – 26 February 2022) was a Bulgarian pianist, conductor and composer.

== Life and career ==
Goleminov was born in Bulgaria, and was the son of composer Marin Goleminov. He studied composition with Dimitar Tapkoff and Konstantin Iliev and conducting with Konstantin Iliev at the State Music Conservatory in Sofia, then in 1985 continued his musical education in Austria and Holland with Roman Haubenstock-Ramati, Ton de Leeuw, Alexander Baltin (composition), Karl Österreicher (conducting), and Harald Ossberger (piano). He also studied electroacoustic music with Dieter Kaufmann at Institute for Electroacoustic Music in Vienna.

Between 1992 and 1998, Goleminov collaborated in a series of theatrical productions in Austria and took part in projects involving contemporary arts, mixed media, and intuitive and computer music.

A participant in various concerts as pianist, composer, and conductor, he is the recipient of such international composition prizes as the Hambacher Preis, Sommerliche Musiktage Hitzacker, Carl Maria von Weber.

His works span a wide spectrum of styles and genres, from chamber and orchestral pieces to computer music, video-compositions and music graphs, and have been commissioned by the Vienna Konzerthaus, Quebec New Music Society (Montreal), the MELO-x Saxophone Quartet, and other leading organizations and ensembles.

Goleminov worked as a freelance musician based in Sofia, and he was the co-founder of Orange Factory psychoacoustic arts (http://orangefactory.net), an experimental center for musical creation, performance, publication, and education.

He died on 26 February 2022, at the age of 65.

== Musical works ==
- 'Floating metal' for piano
- Sonatina, 10 piano pieces
- 'Piano people' (two pianos)
- 'Revelation' for two pianos
- 'Illusion valley' for two pianos and electronics ad lib.
- 'Maze of Ravings' for two pianos and electronics
- GALILEO for piano and electronics
- BLOW for flute
- FRITZ, MY FIRE concert study for piano, Friedrich Gulda in memoriam
- "Music of melting ice" for piano
- 'Coyote' for saxophone quartet and live electronics
- 'VOX' for saxophone quartet, vocals and electronics
- "Five o'clock at Heiner Stadler's" for violin, piano and electronics
- 'Chain Wheel' for cello, piano and electronics
- 'Lightwave' II for large orchestra and electronics
- "Incoherent.... lay-by" for chamber ensemble
- String quartet
- Contemplations - musical graphics
- CONCERTO in c minor for two pianos
- Gladiator for two percussionists and live electronics
- HYPERKLAVIER for piano and live electronics
- Béla Bartók's Heart for large orchestra, electronics and video
- Implicitly for piano left hand
- MAGRITTE-ETUDES for one or two pianos and video
- TRANSFIGURATIONS OF SUNRISE for large orchestra
- LE VOYEUR for bass clarinet and live electronics
- INEVITABLE FLASHBACK for bass clarinet and electronics
- ILLUSION VALLEY for two pianos and electronics
- Prelude and Fugue for piano and live electronics
- The Double Live of Dr. Schoenberg for alto saxophone and live electronics
- PARLIAMENT piano and electronics
- Silicon Concerto for artificial intelligence and any number of soloists
- 7 piano etudes
- Electronic music and music for instruments and live electronics
- Generative music software (for Windows) for live performance and experimental purposes - HYPERKLAVIER, ANTHILL, DR. SCHOENBERG, ALEXANDER SCRIABIN - Paint-shop, Ltd., TOTAL-J, CYCLOPS, SILICON CONCERT0, SYNAESTYZER, E_SHAKESPEARE
- Music for theater, TV and video
