= Fábio Caramuru =

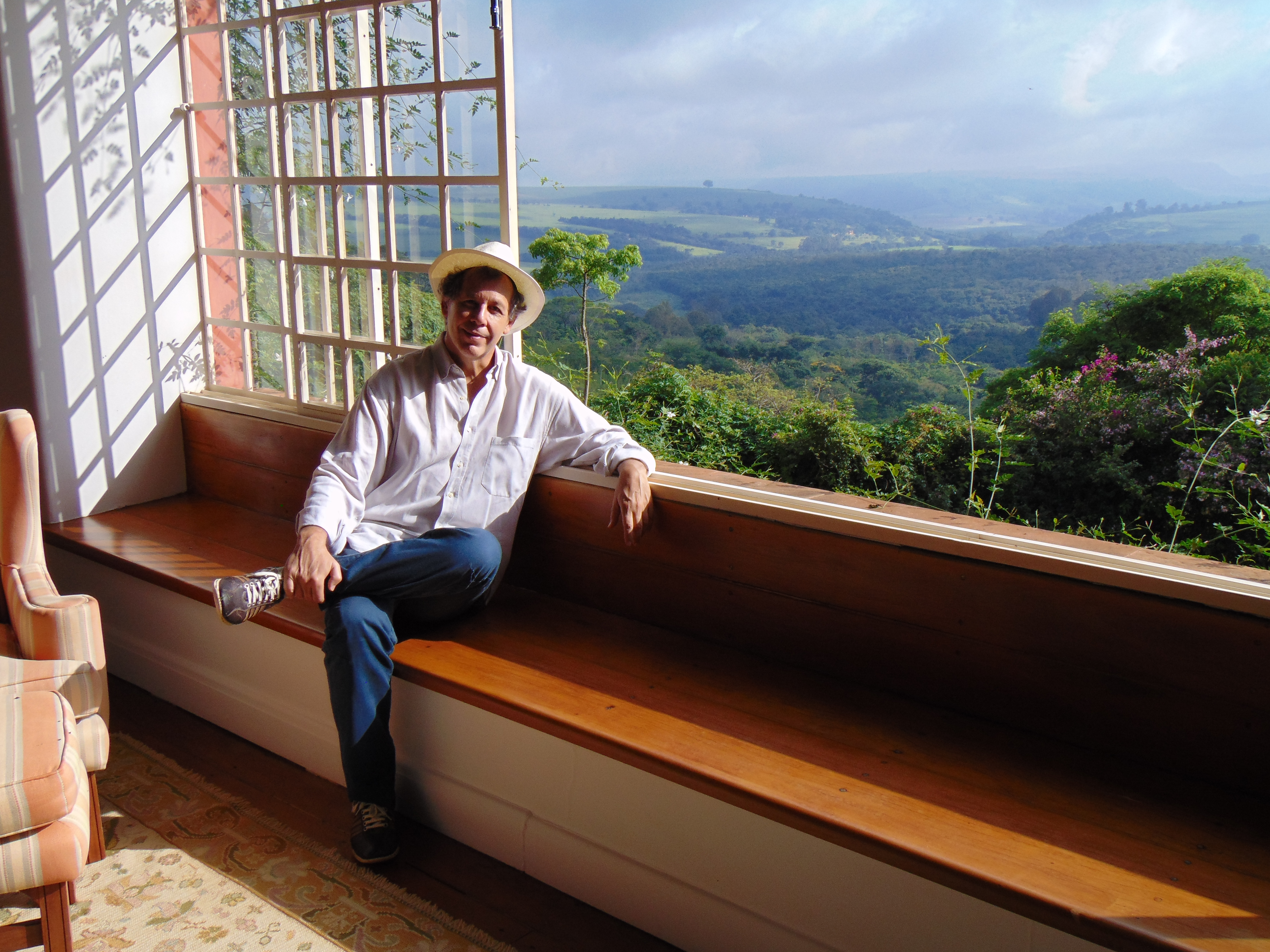
- Fábio Caramuru taking a break from recording EcoMúsica, 2015

Background information
- Also known as: Fábio Caramuru
- Born: Fábio Luiz Caramuru September 14, 1956; São Paulo, Brazil
- Genres: Bossa nova, Latin jazz, Classical music, MPB
- Occupations: Musician, composer, songwriter
- Instrument: Piano
- Years active: 1977–present
- Labels: Flau-Japan, Labor Records-USA, MCD-Brazil, Master Class-Brazil, Echo-Brazil
- Website: www.fabiocaramuru.com.br

Cigarra
"Cigarra", by Fábio Caramuru, is the first track of the CD Dialogues between a piano and the Brazilian fauna.

Fábio Caramuru (São Paulo Brazil, September 14, 1956) is a Brazilian pianist, composer and musical producer.

== Biography ==
Fábio Caramuru develops two main projects: EcoMúsica Project and Tom Jobim for Piano.

The EcoMusica Project has been developed by Caramuru since 2013. It is a pioneering initiative, dedicated to the Brazilian nature, that mixes his music and sounds of nature in an inventive way, with the important mission of alerting for the preservation of the environment. Through this project Caramuru already released the albums EcoMusica | Dialogues between a piano and the Brazilian fauna (2015) and EcoMusica | Aves (Birds of Japan) (2018), many music videos such as Cicada, Tico-tico, Bem-te-vi, Harpy Eagle, Macaws, Hidorigamo and Quero-quero (all available on Caramuru's YouTube Channel), as well as several EcoMusica Concerts in Brazil, Japan, and Canada. In September 2020, the pianist released the video Amazonia EcoMusica Uirapuru, a legend of the forest. The video was directed by Otavio Dias, Cecilia Lucchesi was in charge of the scene research and the script was written by Caramuru himself. It was produced entirely during the social distancing period, and this new work portraits the musician on an imaginary trip from his living room to the depths of Brazilian Amazon forest, as he is lured by the mysterious song of the legendary bird Uirapuru, which is rarely seen.

Fabio Caramuru's distinctive style is a fresh blend of classic compositional techniques with a contemporary flair. For the EcoMusica repertoire, Fabio's main thematic materials are borrowed primarily from bird songs and nature sounds, crafted in elaborated soundscapes for the piano.

Tom Jobim for Piano and on Radio

In the past 25 years, the pianist has been developing a consistent research on Tom Jobim. His master's degree at São Paulo University (2000) was dedicated to the aspects of piano performance on Tom Jobim's music. In 2017, he released a double album Tom Jobim - Piano by Fábio Caramuru performing his own arrangements for 28 of some of the most famous Jobim's works (Flau Japan). His Piano Duo Brasil em Dois Pianos, created by Caramuru and the pianist Marco Bernardo, have been presenting the Brazilian repertoire, mainly Tom Jobim's pieces, in many concerts in Brazil. Most of the arrangements are exclusive and written by Marco Bernardo. Caramuru also presents EcoMusica and Tom Jobim's pieces in solo concerts and with orchestras in Brazil, Japan and Europe as well. In 2020, Caramuru and Babu Baía started a radio program about Tom Jobim (Cultura FM, São Paulo, Brazil - 103.3 MHZ).

The first years and other cultural projects

Fábio Caramuru first began his professional career as an architect. It was not too long, however, before he exchanged architecture for music. After being granted a scholarship by the French Government in 1980, Caramuru moved to Paris where he studied under the supervision of the great Brazilian-French pianist Magda Tagliaferro. After his return to Brazil, Caramuru undertook a position at the board of directors of the Magda Tagliaferro Foundation in São Paulo. His many musical projects included Camargo Guarnieri and Magda Tagliaferro festivals, a project about the history of the Brazilian music and several records, among which an album about Brazilian composers, and his own piano solo arrangements on Tom Jobim's songs. In 2005, the French pianists Katia and Marielle Labèque performed Tom Jobim's Chovendo na Roseira, the first of a series of arrangements for two pianos written by Fábio Caramuru. Caramuru formed the Duo Caramuru/Baldanza with the bass player Pedro Baldanza. Among Caramuru's outstanding appearances are a concert with Minas Gerais Philharmonic Orchestra (Stravinsky), São Paulo Symphonic Brass Orchestra (Tom Jobim), São Paulo University Symphonic Orchestra (Poulenc) and Jazz Symphonic Orchestra, the latter performing special arrangements of Nino Rota’s and Richard Rodgers movie soundtracks; the concerts with the singers Fernando Portari and Magda Painno; his double-CD Piano - Tom Jobim por Fábio Caramuru celebrating the 80th Tom Jobim’s anniversary, and the innovative and acclaimed CD Bossa in the Shadows, with the remarkable contribution of bass player Pedro Baldanza. In November 2010, Caramuru made a Brazilian Music Recital in Toronto (Victoria Chapel / Toronto University) and a Brazilian Jazz Show at Zinc Bar in New York City. In 2011, a European tour included two concerts with Brussels Philharmonic Orchestra in Belgium, and shows at JazzStation in Brussels and at Jazz Club Moods in Zurich. In 2012, he performed as soloist with ORTHESP Orchestra in São Paulo, as well as at the International Jazz Festival in Havana, Cuba. In 2013, he performed at the renowned Club Reserva in Gent, Belgium, and started the research for the project EcoMúsica, based on the interaction between sounds of nature and the piano. In 2014, he directed and performed as soloist in projects such as the one which marked Tom Jobim's 20 years of departure at Caixa Cultural São Paulo, and "Brazil in Two Pianos", a national tour, with the pianist Barco Bernardo, as well as at Instrumental SESC Brasil. In 2015, Caramuru released his CD Ecomúsica |Dialogues between a piano and the Brazilian fauna, also available in Japanese edition since September 2016 by Label Flau. In April 2016, Caramuru's innovative video clip EcoMúsica | Cicada was released with a concert at Sala São Paulo. In 2017, Fábio Caramuru had eight concerts scheduled in several Japanese cities, as well as concerts EcoMúsica at Auditório Ibirapuera, a new video and concerts for EcoMúsica | Rio de Janeiro and a two-piano tribute to Tom Jobim at Sala São Paulo. In 2017, his album Tom Jobim by Fabio Caramuru as well as Dó Ré Mi Fon Fon (27 Brazilian Nursery Songs) were released by Flau in Japan. In 2018, the pianist released his second album EcoMusica, EcoMúsica Aves (Flau, Japan), having 20 different Japanese birds as inspiration. He has also made two major concerts in São Paulo - Sala São Paulo and Auditório Ibirapuera - both dedicated to the 110th Anniversary of Japanese Immigration in Brazil. Caramuru also released four new videos EcoMúsica: Bem-te-vi, Harpia (with the dancer ismael Ivo), Araras and Hidorigamo (with the ceramicist Hideko Honma), all of them available on his YouTube channel. The video EcoMúsica | Harpia was awarded the prize Masters of Creativity by the prestigious portal Catraca Livre. In 2019, Caramuru continued to develop the EcoMúsica Project, presenting it in concerts in Brazil (SESC, Japan House) and Canada, celebrating the 5th Anniversary of Cafe & Cultura Toronto, at Granite Club. Among his projects in 2020, there was Two Piano Concert at Sala São Paulo, presenting his Duo Brasil em Dois Pianos, in February, an online concert promoted by SESC São Paulo, a new video EcoMúsica - Amazonia Uirapuru and new videos dedicated to Tom Jobim have been released along the year. In 2021, among other projects, Caramuru develops two new videos at Brazilian Atlantic Rain Forest.

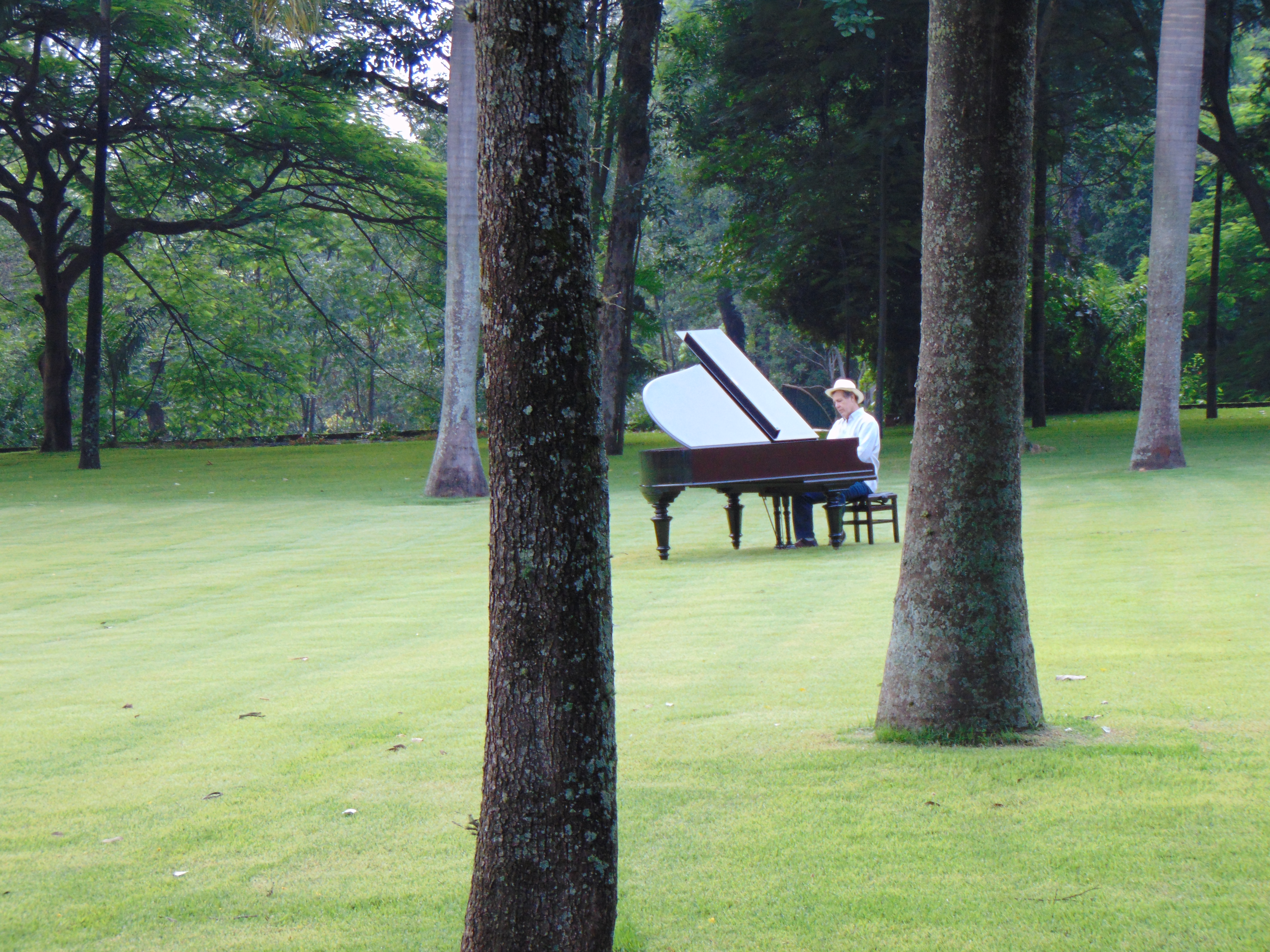
Pianist Fábio Caramuru; pianista Fábio Caramuru

== Sources ==
- Bossa Online Magazine - The symphony of the birds - Interview with Fabio Caramuru by Madalena Sousa, 2019
- Album Dialogues Between a Piano and the Brazilian Fauna, 2015
- Album EcoMusica Aves, 2018
- Fabio Caramuru's Youtube Channel
- Text published by Greenpeace about the EcoMusica Project and the video Amazonia EcoMusica Uirapuru
- Album Tom Jobim, 2017
- Brasil em Dois Pianos, Instrumental Sesc Brasi, 2014
- Fabio Caramuru e Babu Baía, Tom Jobim, Cultura FM, 2020
- Text by Todd B. Gruel about the CD 'EcoMúsica | Aves', 2018, Fluid Radio - Experimental Frequencies
- CD of the week, "EcoMúsica explora o canto de 20 aves japonesas, Cultura FM, May 2018
- Interview for Radio USP about EcoMúsica project, the new CD and the concert at Sala São Paulo, April 2018
- "Concerto EcoMúsica | Aves de Fábio Caramuru", by Jo Takahashi, April 2018
- Yomitai, April 2018
- Interview for Repórter Eco, TV Cultura, May 2017
- Text by Todd B. Gruel about the CD 'Do Ré Mi Fon Fon', 2017, Fluid Radio - Experimental Frequencies
- Jornal de Londrina, February 4, 2008 (article about the CD Bossa in the Shadows)
- "Poética entre o clássico e o popular", Estado de S. Paulo, Caderno 2, pages 10 and 11, December, 2007
- Dicionário Cravo Albin da Música Popular Brasileira
- Folha de S.Paulo, Ilustrada, May 31, 2007
- Souza, Tárik de. "Tons sobre Tom", Jornal do Brasil, January 23, 2007
- Instrumental SESC Brasil, 2007, Fábio Caramuru and Pedro Baldanza
- Fábio Caramuru + Jazz Sinfônica
