= Milwaukee Symphony Chorus =

Choral ensemble

The Milwaukee Symphony Chorus is the choral ensemble of the Milwaukee Symphony Orchestra. Founded in 1976 by Margaret Hawkins at the request of the MSO's second music director, Kenneth Schermerhorn, it was originally called the Wisconsin Conservatory Symphony Chorus owing to its joint sponsorship with the Wisconsin Conservatory of Music and fulfilled the MSO's need for a chorus of consistent quality. It became the Milwaukee Symphony Chorus in 1985 when it was formally incorporated into the institutional structure of the MSO.

The chorus consists of some 150 auditioned voices from various backgrounds, with certain members making up a specially auditioned professional core along with a small number of alternate core members. Chorus auditions are held in June and August for the fall semester and in early January for the spring semester. Following Hawkins' death in 1993, directorship of the chorus passed to her protégé, Lee Erickson, who held the Margaret Hawkins Chorus Director Chair, funded in honor of Hawkins during the chorus' 30th anniversary year in 2006, until his retirement from the position at the end of the 2015-2016 season. Following a national search, the Milwaukee Symphony Orchestra appointed Dr. Cheryl Frazes Hill, associate conductor of the Chicago Symphony Chorus, as the third director of the chorus in May 2017; her tenure began during the 2017-2018 season.

The Milwaukee Symphony Chorus has performed with the Milwaukee Ballet, the Milwaukee Children's Choir, the Milwaukee Chamber Orchestra, and the Chicago Symphony Orchestra at the Ravinia Festival. The chorus has worked with world-renowned conductors such as Helmuth Rilling, Nicholas McGegan, Grant Llewellyn, James Conlon, Christopher Seaman, Andreas Delfs, and Doc Severinsen, as well as former MSO music director Edo de Waart and MSO principal pops conductor Marvin Hamlisch. Christoph Eschenbach, after leading the Chicago Symphony and the MSC in a Ravinia performance in 2005, pronounced the Milwaukee Symphony Chorus "world-class".

== Chorus directors ==
- Margaret Hawkins (1976–1993)
- Lee Erickson (1994–2016)
- Cheryl Frazes Hill (2017–present)
