= Gheorghi Arnaoudov =

Bulgarian composer (born 1957)

Gheorghi Arnaoudov (Bulgarian: Георги Арнаудов, romanized: Georgi Arnaudov, pronounced [ɡɛˈɔrɡi ɐrnɐˈudof]; born 18 March 1957) is a Bulgarian composer of stage, orchestral, chamber, film, vocal, and piano music. His work has roots in minimal music.

== Life ==
Gheorghi Arnaoudov was born on 18 March 1957 in Sofia, Bulgaria. He graduated from the Pancho Vladigerov National Academy of Music, having studied in composition with Alexander Tanev and contemporary music with Bojidar Spassov. At the same time, he attended summer courses working with Brian Ferneyhough and Ton de Leeuw.

His artistic career started in the early 1980s. At the same time, he did research work in the fields of electronic music, music theory and musique concrète, as well as ancient Far-Eastern and ancient Greek music. He won multiple national and international awards, including the Grand Prix of the European Broadcasting Union (1985), the Golden Harp Prize from Jeunesses Musicales (1985), the Special Prize of the Union of Bulgarian Composers (1986), and the Carl Maria von Weber International Prize for Music (1989).

He is the author of scientific and theoretical articles in music, as well as of reviews in musical and scientific periodicals, mainly in the spheres of the aesthetics of modernism and postmodernism, and communications in the music, contemporary arts, musical semiotics, and theory of contemporary music.

In 2000, Gega New released a CD with Arnaoudov's music called "Thyepoleo. Orphic Mysterial Rites". The texts used by the composer are the original preserved Orphic Hymns. For this project, he consulted renowned Thracologist, Alexander Fol, who wrote the programme notes.

To date Arnaoudov has produced numerous symphonies, oratorios, and concertos, and has won several international prizes. He currently teaches in the Theatre and Music departments of New Bulgarian University. In 2009, he was appointed associate professor in Composition and Harmony.

The antecedents of his music can be found in Alexander Scriabin, Olivier Messiaen, Edgard Varèse and, more recently, in the work of Krzysztof Penderecki and Arvo Pärt. The influence of composers like Anton Webern and Morton Feldman is shown in the lack of any kind of conventional process or development.

In Arnaoudov's series of works, the composer's vision is directed towards attaining a new aesthetic of pure music (Adorno), aestheticizing renaissance sound purity. By using various techniques (including techniques legitimizing the language of Musical Avant-garde) and their substance rethinking is achieved a new music-sensuous semantic field.

== Works ==
=== Stage ===
- Offertorium I – dance theater after Herman Broch (1988)
- Offertorium II – after Jorge Luis Borges (1991)
- Transpatium – ballet (1996)
- Choreordained – two-act ballet (1996)
- "...the highest point of my inferiority..." (1998)
- "Black Box – dance theater (1998)
- Threshold – dance theater (2001)

=== Orchestral ===
- Symphony No. 1 (1984)
- Concerto for Orchestra (1986)
- Concerto grosso (1987)
- Kammerkonzert (1988)
- Symphony No. 2 (1990)
- Laus Solis (1996)
- The Colour of the Light (1997)
- Variations on a Theme by Rachmaninov (2001)
- Concierto Barroco – after Alejo Carpentier (2007)
- "Liber Canticorum" Chapter I – Imaginary opera scenes, for soprano, tenor and orchestra based on a texts by Horace (2008)
- Passio et mors Domini nostri Jesu Christi secundum Liber Psalmorum – for bass, soprano, choir and orchestra (2008)
- Hymns to the spring – Nikolai Liliev (2008)
- Concerto for Violin, Strings, Percussion and Keyboards (2008–10)

=== Chamber ===
- String Quartet No. 2 (1988)
- Ritual III (Borges Fragment) (1993)
- Vihaya (1995)
- Thyepolia (1997)
- Kells (1999)
- Variations for two pianos and percussion (2001)
- Fantasmagorias – El libro de los seres imaginarios (Imaginarium super Jorge Luis Borges) for string quartet (2010)

=== Vocal ===
- Footnote (...und Isolde/ns Winkfall lassen) – for soprano and chamber orchestra based on the poem "A Prayer" by James Joyce (1991)
- Summe Deus (1991)
- The Circle of Rites (1991)
- The Way of the Birds I – for soprano, flute and violin (1995)
- The Way of the Birds II – for soprano and chamber ensemble (1996)
- The Way of the Birds III – for soprano, clarinet, violin, cello and percussion (1996)
- Thyepoleo (2000)

=== Piano ===
- Paysages sonores (1983)
- Partita I (1984)
- Ritual I (1988)
- Incarnation in the Light (Ritual II) (1993)
- "...un pan de ciel au milieu du silence..." – after René Magritte (1993)
- Svarog Ritual (1994)
- Le temple du silence – for two pianos (1996)
- Et iterum venturus (1997)
- Forgotten Songs (2005)
- Monodies (2009)
- Le Rappel des Rameaux (2009)

== Recordings ==
Works by Gheorghi Arnaoudov have been recorded and released internationally by labels including Gega New, Labor Records, Holophon Records and other publishers specializing in contemporary and Bulgarian music.

Among the composer's major recording projects is Thyepoleo – Orphic Mysterial Rites, released by Gega New. The work, based on preserved Orphic Hymns, was developed in consultation with Bulgarian Thracologist Alexander Fol.

Arnaoudov's piano music has also been commercially recorded, including works such as Svarog Ritual, Ritual I, Incarnation in the Light, Forgotten Songs, Monodies, and Le Rappel des Rameaux, performed by pianist Angela Tosheva.

Concierto Barroco for violin and orchestra received its first recording in 2011 by violinist Mario Hossen, conductor Nayden Todorov, and the Orpheus Academy Orchestra of New Bulgarian University. For this recording Arnaoudov composed additional cadenzas specifically for Hossen.

Works by Arnaoudov have also been recorded by performers including cellist Anatoli Krastev, whose recordings include contemporary Bulgarian repertoire by composers of the late twentieth and early twenty-first centuries.

Additional works documented in the composer's discography include Kells, Liber Canticorum, The Way of the Birds, Interpretationes, and various chamber and orchestral compositions recorded in Bulgaria and abroad.
