= Roberto Sierra =

Puerto Rican composer (born 1953)

- Born: October 9, 1953 (age 73); Vega Baja, Puerto Rico
- Occupation: Composer

Roberto Sierra (born 9 October 1953) is a Puerto Rican composer of contemporary classical music.

== Life ==
Sierra was born in Vega Baja, Puerto Rico. He studied composition at the Royal College of Music and at the Hochschule für Musik in Hamburg, Germany, notably with György Ligeti from (1979–1982). After his two-act opera El mensajero de plata, to a libretto by Myrna Casas, had premiered at the Interamerican Festival in San Juan on 9 October 1986, Sierra came to prominence in 1987 when his first major orchestral composition, Júbilo, was performed at Carnegie Hall by the Milwaukee Symphony Orchestra. (Júbilo had been premiered in Puerto Rico in 1985 by the Puerto Rico Symphony Orchestra conducted by Zdeněk Mácal; it was also performed in 1986 by the same forces conducted by Akira Endo.) For more than three decades his works have been part of the repertoire of many of the leading orchestras, ensembles and festivals in the USA and Europe. His Fandangos was performed at the opening night of the 2002 Proms, performed by the BBC Symphony Orchestra and televised throughout Europe.

Sierra is a retired professor at Cornell University in Ithaca, New York, where he taught composition. See: List of music students by teacher: R to S#Roberto Sierra.

== Music ==
On February 2, 2006 Sierra's Missa Latina, premiered at the Kennedy Center, in Washington, D.C., conducted by Leonard Slatkin to considerable acclaim. The Washington Times judged it "the most significant symphonic premiere in the District since the late Benjamin Britten's War Requiem was first performed in the Washington National Cathedral in the late 1960s." On March 3, 2007, the Missa Latina was performed at the 51st Casals Festival in Sierra's homeland, Puerto Rico, where it was equally well-received.

Sierra's Concierto Barroco takes its inspiration from a scene in Alejo Carpentier's novel of the same name in which Handel and Vivaldi jam with a Cuban slave during the Venice Carnival. Sierra was commissioned by guitarist Manuel Barrueco to write a concerto that tried to capture what that might have been like. In Soundboard magazine, Eladio Scharron wrote that, "Sierra achieved – masterfully – a synthesis of a tradition of five centuries old... This work is truly a masterwork..."

Other commissioned works include:

- a Concerto for Orchestra for the centennial celebrations of the Philadelphia Orchestra commissioned by the Koussevitzky Music Foundation and the Philadelphia Orchestra;
- a Concerto for Saxophones and Orchestra, commissioned by the Detroit Symphony Orchestra for James Carter;
- Fandangos and Missa Latina, commissioned by the National Symphony Orchestra;
- Sinfonía No. 3 "La Salsa", commissioned by the Milwaukee Symphony Orchestra;
- Danzas Concertantes for guitar and orchestra commissioned by the Orquesta de Castilla y León;
- a Double Concerto for Violin and Viola, co-commissioned by the Pittsburgh and Philadelphia Orchestras;
- Bongo+, commissioned by the Juilliard School in celebration of the 100th anniversary;
- Songs from the Diaspora, commissioned by Music Accord for Heidi Grant Murphy, Kevin Murphy and the St. Lawrence String Quartet;
- Concierto para Violin y Orquesta a la memoria de una nina valiente commissioned by the Lydia Delfs Foundation and premiered by Juliana Athayde and the Rochester Philharmonic Orchestra; and
- Concierto de Cámara, co-commissioned by the Santa Fe Chamber Music Festival, Chamber Music Northwest and Stanford Lively Arts.

Other ensembles who have commissioned Sierra include the orchestras of Pittsburgh, Atlanta, New Mexico, Houston, Minnesota, Dallas, San Antonio, and Phoenix, as well as the American Composers Orchestra, the New York Philharmonic, Los Angeles Philharmonic, Royal Scottish National Orchestra, the Zurich Tonhalle Orchestra, and the orchestras of Madrid, Galicia, and Barcelona.

Roberto Sierra's Music may be heard on CDs by Naxos, EMI, UMG’s EMARCY, New World Records, Albany Records, Koch, New Albion, Koss Classics, BMG, Fleur de Son and other labels. In 2011, UMG’s EMARCY label released Caribbean Rhapsody featuring the Concierto for Saxophones and Orchestra commissioned and premiered by the DSO with James Carter. In 2004, EMI Classics released his two guitar concertos Folias and Concierto Barroco with Manuel Barrueco as soloist (released on Koch in the USA in 2005). In 2010, Missa Latina's Naxos recording was nominated for a Grammy Award under best contemporary classical composition category, and his Sinfonia No. 4 was nominated in that same category in 2015.

== Works ==
Some of Sierra's selected works include: Selected orchestral works

- A Joyous Overture (c. 5')
- Alegría (c. 6')
- The Bacchae (c. 12’)
- Borikén (c. 12')
- Carnaval (c. 18’)
- Concierto para orquesta [Concerto for Orchestra] (c. 20')
- El jardín de las delicias (c. 10')
- Fandangos (c. 12')
- Idilio -SATB choir and orchestra (c. 7')
- Júbilo (c. 8')
- La Lira (Juan Morel Campos) – orchestrated by Roberto Sierra (11”)
- Preámbulo (c. 10')
- Ritmo (c. 6')
- Saludo (c. 4')
- SASIMA (c. 11')
- Serenata (c. 15')
- Sinfonía No. 1 (c. 17')
- Sinfonía No. 2 (c. 15')
- Sinfonía No. 3 "La Salsa" (c. 23')
- Sinfonía No. 4 (c. 22’)
- Tropicalia (c. 23')
- Un recuerdo (c. 2')

Selected concertos

- Bongo+ – solo percussion and chamber orchestra (c. 20-)
- Concerto for Saxophones and Orchestra – piano reduction (c. 22')
- Concerto for Viola – solo viola with string orchestra and 2 percussionists (c. 22')
- Concierto Evocativo – solo horn and strings (c. 19')
- Con madera metal y cuero – solo percussion and orchestral (c. 28')
- Concerto for Saxophones and Orchestra (c. 22')
- Concierto Barroco – solo guitar and orchestra (c. 10')
- Concierto Barroco – piano reduction (c. 10')
- Concierto Caribe – solo flute and orchestra (c. 20')
- Concierto Caribe – piano reduction (c. 20')
- Cuatro versos – solo cello and orchestra (c. 20')
- Danzas Concertantes – solo guitar and orchestra (c. 26')
- Doble Concierto – solo violin, solo viola and orchestra (c. 25')
- Evocaciones – solo violin and orchestra (c. 22')
- Folias – solo guitar and orchestra (c. 15')
- Folias – solo guitar and orchestra; piano reduction (c. 15')
- Fantasía Corelliana -two guitars and string Orchestra (c. 11')
- Glosas – solo piano and orchestra (c. 15')
- Imágenes -solo guitar, solo violin and orchestra (c. 23')
- Of Discoveries – two guitars and orchestra (c. 22')
- Poema y Danza – 2 oboes and strings (11’)
- Variations on a Souvenir – solo piano and orchestra (c. 30')

Selected vocal works

- Bayoán – oratorio for soprano, baritone SATB chorus and orchestra (c. 40')
- Beyond the Silence of Sorrow – soprano and orchestra – (c. 25')
- Beyond the Silence of Sorrow – soprano and piano – (c. 25')
- Cancionero Sefardí – soprano (or tenor), flute, clarinet, violin, cello and piano (c. 16')
- Cinco poemas aztecas – soprano (or tenor) and piano (c. 12')
- Conjuros – soprano (or tenor) and piano (c. 12')
- Doña Rosita – mezzo Soprano and wind quintet (c. 6')
- El mensajero de plata – chamber opera (c. 70')
- El éxtasis de Santa Teresa – soprano and Chamber Orchestra (c. 15')
- Invocaciones – voice and percussion (c. 14')
- Missa Latina – soprano, baritone, SATB choir and orchestra (c. 77')
- Missa Latina – soprano, baritone, SATB choir and orchestra – piano vocal score (c. 77')
- Rimas – soprano (or tenor) and piano (c. 9')
- Songs from the Diaspora – soprano, string quartet and piano (c. 20')

Chamber orchestra

- Cuentos – chamber orchestra (c. 12')
- Doce Bagatelas – string Orchestra (c. 20')
- El éxtasis de Santa Teresa – soprano and Chamber Orchestra (c. 15')
- Güell Concert – chamber orchestra (c. 15')

Smaller ensembles

- Concierto de Cámara – wind quintet & string quartet (c. 18')
- Concierto Nocturnal – solo harpsichord, flute, oboe, clarinet, violin and cello (c. 15')
- El sueño de Tartini – flute, clarinet, violin, cello and piano (c. 9')
- Octeto – 2 Oboes, 2 Clarinets, 2 Bassoons, and 2 Horns (c. 10')
- Pequeño Concierto – guitar, flute, oboe, clarinet, violin and cello (c. 10')
- Piezas Características – bass clarinet, trumpet, piano, violin and cello (c. 16')
- Turner – flute, clarinet, violin, cello and piano (c. 12')

Wind ensemble (including works with soloists)

- Carnaval – transcribed by Mark Sacterday (c. 18")
- Diferencias (c. 10')
- Fandangos – transcribed by Mark Scatterday (c. 12')
- Fanfarría – brass ensemble and percussion (c. 3')
- Rapsodia – solo trumpet and wind ensemble (c. 11')
- Sinfonía No.3 – transcribed by Mark Scatterday (c. 24’)

Choral (including works with soloists)

- Cantos Populares – SATB choir (c. 9')
- Guakía Baba – SATB choir (c. 5')
- Lux Æterna – SATB Choir (c. 5')
- Missa Latina – soprano, baritone, SATB choir with keyboard accompaniment (c. 77')

Chamber works

- Con Tres – clarinet, bassoon and piano (c. 15')
- Cronicas del discubrimiento – flute and guitar (c. 20')
- Cuarteto para cuerdas no. 2 (c. 14')
- Doce Bagatelas – string quartet (c. 20')
- Doña Rosita – mezzo Soprano and wind quintet (c. 6')
- Essays – wind quintet (c. 10')
- Fuego de ángel – piano quartet
- Kandinsky – violin, viola, cello and piano (c. 17')
- Mambo 7/16 – String Quartet (c. 2’)
- Memorias Tropicales – string quartet (c. 13')
- Recordando una melodía olvidada – clarinet, violin and piano (c. 11')
- Salsa para vientos – wind quintet (c. 7')
- Tres fantasías – clarinet, cello and piano (c. 11')
- Trio Tropical – violin, cello and piano (c. 14')
- Trio No. 2 – violin, cello and piano (c. 12')
- Trio No. 3 -violin, cello and piano (c. 13’)
- Trio No. 4 "La noche" – violin, cello and piano (c. 14")
- Tríptico – guitar and string quartet (c. 13')

Keyboard works

- Con Salsa – harpsichord (c. 4')
- Descarga en sol – piano (c. 4’)
- Fantasía Cromática – organ (3’)
- Piezas Imaginarias – piano (c. 18')
- Polivals – piano (c. 3')
- Preludios Caprichosos – piano (c. 29’)
- Reflections on a Souvenir – piano (c. 9’ )
- Sch. – piano four hands (c. 13’)
- Suite – harpsichord (c. 7')
- Toccata – piano (c. 6’)
- Treinta y tres formas de observar un mismo objeto – piano 4 hands (c. 25')
- Tres inventos – piano (c. 5')
- Tres Miniaturas – harpsichord (c. 3')
- Vestigios Rituales – two pianos (c. 8')
- 2X3 – two Pianos (c. 12')

Solo and duo works

- Bongo-0 – solo bongos (c. 4')
- Changos – flute and harpsichord (c. 7')
- Cinco Bocetos – clarinet (c. 9')
- Crónicas del descubrimiento – flute and guitar (c. 19')
- Eros – flute and piano (c. 3')
- Flower Pieces – flute and harp (c. 17')
- Glosa a la sombra – mezzo-soprano, clarinet, viola and piano (c. 10’)
- Fanfarria, aria y movimiento perpetuo – violin and piano (c. 7')
- Los destellos de la resonancia – percussion (cymbals) and piano (c. 5')
- Mano a mano – two percussionists (c. 6')
- Mariposas – flute (c. 4')
- Piezas Breves – guitar (c. 15')
- Piezas fáciles – 2 violins (8’)
- Prelude, Habanera and Perpetual Motion – flute (or recorder) and guitar (c. 8')
- Renadio – flute and guitar (c. 6')
- Ritmorroto – clarinet (c. 6')
- Salsa on the C String – cello and piano (c. 2')
- Sonata Nr. 1 for Cello and Piano (c. 10')
- Sonata Nr. 2 "Elegiaca" for Cello and Piano (c. 12')
- Sonata for Clarinet and Piano (c. 12’)
- Sonata for Flute and Piano (c. 12')
- Sonata para Guitarra (c. 14')
- Sonata for Violin and Piano (c. 14')
- Suite de canciones y danzas – cello and piano (c. 12’)
- Tema y variaciones – clarinet and piano (c. 7')
- Toccata y lamento – guitar (c. 5')
- Tres homenajes húngaros – two guitars (c. 12')
- Tres pensamientos – bass clarinet and percussion (c. 9')

== Awards and honors ==
In 2003 he was awarded the Academy Award in Music by the American Academy of Arts and Letters. The award states: "Roberto Sierra writes brilliant music, mixing fresh and personal melodic lines with sparkling harmonies and striking rhythms. . ." His Sinfonía No. 1, a work commissioned by the St. Paul Chamber Orchestra, won the 2004 Kenneth Davenport Competition for Orchestral Works. In 2007 the Serge and Olga Koussevitzky International Recording Award (KIRA) was awarded to Albany Records for the recording of his composition Sinfonía No. 3 “La Salsa”. Roberto Sierra has served as Composer-In-Residence with the Milwaukee Symphony Orchestra, The Philadelphia Orchestra, The Puerto Rico Symphony Orchestra and New Mexico Symphony. In 2010 he was elected to the American Academy of Arts and Sciences. In 2017, Sierra was awarded the Tomás Luis de Victoria Prize, the highest honor given in Spain to a composer of Spanish or Latin American origin, by the Society of Spanish Composers Foundation. In 2021, he won a Latin Grammy Award for Best Classical Contemporary Composition.
