= Orchestre des Champs-Élysées =

French orchestra

The Orchestre des Champs-Élysées is an orchestra that specializes in the performance of music from the period from roughly 1750 to the early twentieth century, that is, it covers the period from the flourishing of Haydn to that of Mahler. It performs each work on instruments from the period of the composer's lifetime.

It was established in 1991.

== Venues ==
As of 2010, the Orchestra has been in residence at the Théâtre des Champs-Elysées in Paris, and at the Palais des Beaux-Arts in Brussels, for several years. It has performed in such venues as the Concertgebouw (Amsterdam), the Musikverein (Vienna), the Barbican Centre (London), Alte Oper (Frankfurt), the Philharmonic Halls in Berlin and Munich, the Gewandhaus (Leipzig), the Lincoln Center (New York), Parco della Musica (Rome) and the Auditoriums of Dijon and Lucerne.

== Conductors ==
As of 2010, the Artistic Director and principal conductor is Philippe Herreweghe.

Guest conductors have included Daniel Harding, Louis Langrée, Christian Zacharias, Heinz Holliger, Christophe Coin and René Jacobs.

== Critical reaction ==
Writing for Music Web International, Margarida Mota-Bull wrote: "for the first time, I felt differently towards this Symphony and this is entirely due to Herreweghe's, and the Orchestre des Champs-Élysées's credit....there was a light at the end of the tunnel, a triumph over adversity, which I believe was an interpretation very close to the composer’s intentions....this interpretation of the "Scottish" by Philippe Herreweghe and the Orchestre des Champs-Élysées was truly wonderful and arguably, one of the best I have ever had the pleasure of witnessing."

== Discography ==
(in reverse chronological order)

For φ :

In 2010, Philippe Herreweghe has founded his own label, φ (PHI), coproduced with Outhere

MAHLER Symphonie N.4

For Naïve:

BEETHOVEN Works for violin and orchestra

For harmonia mundi:

BRUCKNER Symphony N.5
BRUCKNER Mass N.3 in F minor
SCHUMANN Symphonies N.1 & N.3
MAHLER Des Knaben Wunderhorn
BRUCKNER Symphony N.4
BRUCKNER Symphony N.7
SCHUBERT / MENDELSSOHN Mass in A flat / Psalm 42
FAURE / FRANCK Requiem /Symphonie in D
BEETHOVEN Symphony N.9
SCHUMANN Scenes from Faust
BERLIOZ L'Enfance du Christ
SCHUMANN Cello Concerto / Piano Concerto
SCHUMANN Symphonies N.2 & N.4
MOZART Gran Partita K.361 / Serenade for winds K.388
MOZART Requiem
BRAHMS A German Requiem
MENDELSSOHN Paulus
BEETHOVEN Missa Solemnis
BERLIOZ Summer nights / Herminie
MENDELSSOHN The Midsummer Night's dream / The Hebrides
MENDELSSOHN Elias
MOZART Great mass in C minor
