= Milwaukee Symphony Orchestra =

Symphony orchestra based in Milwaukee, Wisconsin, United States

- Orchestra
- Official logo
- Founded: 1959
- Location: Milwaukee, Wisconsin
- Concert hall: Bradley Symphony Center
- Website: www.mso.org

The Milwaukee Symphony Orchestra (MSO) is an American symphony orchestra based in Milwaukee, Wisconsin. The orchestra performs primarily at the Bradley Symphony Center in Allen-Bradley Hall. The orchestra also serves as the orchestra for Florentine Opera productions.

== History ==
The precursor ensemble to the orchestra was the Milwaukee Pops Orchestra, a part-time ensemble which had been founded 10 years earlier. In 1959, the orchestra formally changed its name to the Milwaukee Symphony Orchestra, hiring Harry John Brown as its first music director. During his nine-year tenure, Brown led the orchestra's transition from a semi-professional pops group to a fully professional, full-time symphony orchestra.

During the tenure of Kenneth Schermerhorn, the orchestra's second music director, from 1968 to 1980, the orchestra had begun its 'State Tour' programme of concerts around Wisconsin, to such cities as Fish Creek, Fond du Lac, Marinette, Ripon, Rhinelander, Three Lakes, West Bend, and Whitewater, Wisconsin, as well as Naperville, Illinois. The orchestra also initiated its concerts for students, gave its first performance at Carnegie Hall in 1972, and embarked upon its first international tour to the Dominican Republic in March 1974. At Schermerhorn's invitation, Margaret Hawkins founded the Milwaukee Symphony Chorus in 1976. Lukas Foss served as the orchestra's third music director, from 1981 to 1986, which saw a notable increase in performances of contemporary music and American compositions, along with the orchestra's first European tour in 1986.

Zdeněk Mácal was the orchestra's fourth music director, from 1986 to 1995. The orchestra began to record for Koss Classics during this period, recording the entirety of Antonín Dvořák's symphonies and tone poems under Mácal's baton, established its Arts in Community Education program in 1990, and toured Japan in 1992. From 1995 to 1997, Stanisław Skrowaczewski served as the orchestra's artistic advisor, prior to the advent of Andreas Delfs as the orchestra's fifth music director from 1997 to 2009. In 1999, the orchestra performed in Cuba, the first American symphony orchestra to do so since the U.S. embargo against Cuba was implemented in 1962. Despite luggage delays, food poisoning that affected the majority of the touring musicians, and the political controversy surrounding the tour, the orchestra played to great acclaim, resulting in the release of The Cuba Concerts in 2000. In 2004, the orchestra released its recording in English of Engelbert Humberdinck's Hansel and Gretel. Delfs became the orchestra's conductor laureate after the conclusion of his tenure in 2009.

Edo de Waart was the orchestra's music director from 2009 to 2017. His appointment was unusual in that de Waart had not conducted the orchestra prior to his appointment. Upon the conclusion of his tenure, the orchestra granted de Waart the title of conductor laureate.

In December 2017, the orchestra purchased the former Warner Grand Theatre, which was restored and remodeled, and opened to full audiences in October 2021.

In May 2018, Ken-David Masur first guest-conducted the orchestra. The orchestra immediately re-engaged him for a subsequent guest-conducting appearance in September 2018. On the basis of these concerts, in November 2018, the orchestra announced the appointment of Masur as its next music director, effective with the 2019–2020 season, with an initial contract of 4 seasons. Masur took the title of music director-designate with immediate effect. In the wake of the COVID-19 pandemic, the MSO extended the initial duration of Masur's tenure first contract as music director through the 2023–2024 season. In November 2023, the MSO announced an extension of Masur's contract as its music director through the 2025–2026 season. In October 2024, the MSO announced that Masur is to conclude his tenure as its music director at the close of the 2025–2026 season.

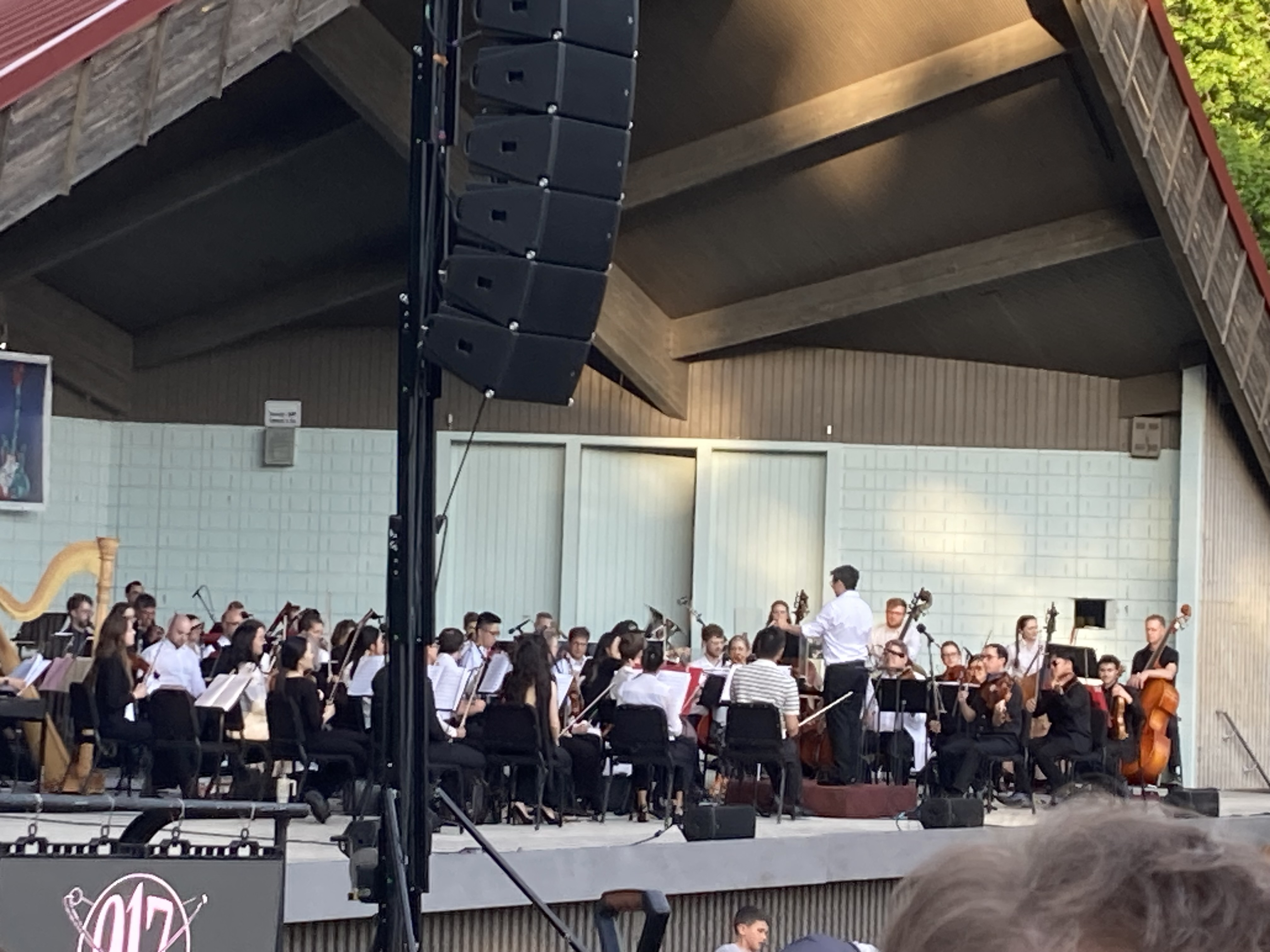
The Milwaukee Symphony Orchestra performing at Chill on the Hill in Humboldt Park in Milwaukee

The orchestra's current assistant conductor is Ryan Tani. Past principal pops conductors have included Doc Severinsen, who holds the title of Principal Pops Conductor Emeritus, and Marvin Hamlisch.

The orchestra has presented more than 100 world and American premieres of works by composers such as Lukas Foss, Philip Glass, Geoffrey Gordon, Daron Hagen, Roy Harris, Erich Korngold, Gian Carlo Menotti, Marc Neikrug, Matthias Pintscher, Daniel Schnyder, Jean Sibelius, Roberto Sierra, Gunther Schuller, William Schuman, Ottorino Respighi, Richard Rodgers, and others. Over 22 compositions have been by MSO musicians.

== Recordings and broadcasts ==
The MSO has also released 19 recordings on the Koss Classics and Telarc labels. These include such projects as the complete symphonies of Antonín Dvořák; an all-Kodaly disc; an acclaimed recording of Beethoven's Symphony No. 9; Berlioz' Symphonie Fantastique and Lélio; Prokofiev’s Alexander Nevsky; works by Lukas Foss, John Duffy, Roberto Sierra, and David Ott; and Smetana's Ma Vlast. On September 16, 2005, the MSO became the first American orchestra to sell recordings of recent concerts for download on iTunes and through the orchestra's web site.

The Cuba Concerts CD features a live recording made during the MSO's 1999 Cuba Millennium Tour. 1999 also saw the release of an a cappella CD featuring the Milwaukee Symphony Chorus. In 2002, the MSO released a CD featuring Prokofiev’s Romeo and Juliet and Tchaikovsky’s The Nutcracker. In 2004, the MSO released the first modern recording in English of Humperdinck's Hänsel und Gretel on the Avie label.

The orchestra is also featured on radio broadcasts via the WFMT Radio Network.

== Music directors ==
- Harry John Brown (1959–1968)
- Kenneth Schermerhorn (1968–1980)
- Lukas Foss (1981–1986)
- Zdeněk Mácal (1986–1995)
- Andreas Delfs (1997–2009)
- Edo de Waart (2009–2017)
- Ken-David Masur (2019–2026)

== See also ==
- Lipinski Stradivarius
- Milwaukee Symphony Chorus
