= Andreas Delfs =

German conductor

- Born: August 30, 1959 (age 67); Flensburg, West Germany
- Occupation: Conductor
- Instruments: Piano, music theory

Andreas Delfs (born 30 August 1959) is a German conductor. He is the music director of the Rochester Philharmonic Orchestra and conductor laureate of the Milwaukee Symphony Orchestra.

== Biography ==
Delfs was born in Flensburg, West Germany. He began studying piano and music theory at age ten, and by age twenty was named music director of the Hamburg University Orchestra. Delfs graduated from Hamburg Conservatory in 1981, and earned his Master's at Juilliard School of Music in 1984. At Hamburg, Delfs studied under Aldo Ceccato and Christoph von Dohnanyi. After receiving his Master's, he accepted the post of assistant conductor of the Pittsburgh Symphony Orchestra, then under the music directorship of Lorin Maazel. From 1984 to 1995, he also held the position of chief conductor of the Swiss Youth Symphony Orchestra. From 1991 to 1994, Delfs was chief conductor of the Bern Theatre.

Delfs was appointed music director and conductor of the Milwaukee Symphony Orchestra in 1997. In 1999, he led the Orchestra on a tour of Cuba, the first by an American orchestra in more than 37 years. Delfs concluded his Milwaukee Symphony tenure at the close of the 2008–2009 season and subsequently took the title of conductor laureate.

Delfs held the post of music director of the St. Paul Chamber Orchestra from 2001 to 2004, and the position of Generalmusikdirektor of the Staatsoper Hannover from 1996 to 2000. In March 2007, Delfs was named principal conductor of the Honolulu Symphony, with an initial contract of 3 years. His tenure with the Honolulu Symphony ended when it went bankrupt and filed for liquidation in December 2010.

In June 2015, Delfs was appointed music director of the Temple University Symphony Orchestra at the Boyer College of Music and Dance, replacing the retired Luis Biava. In addition, he is also to serve as a professor under the school's Department of Instrumental Studies.

Delfs first guest-conducted the Rochester Philharmonic in 1994. In January 2021, the Rochester Philharmonic named Delfs its next music director. Delfs took up the post as of the 2021–2022 season. In October 2025, the Rochester Philharmonic announced an extension of Delfs' contract as its music director through the 2028–2029 season.

== Selected discography ==
- Beethoven: Piano Concertos Nos. 1, 3, & 4 (John O'Conor, piano; London Symphony Orchestra)
- Beethoven: Piano Concertos Nos. 2 & 5 (John O'Conor, London Symphony Orchestra)
- 'Sacred Songs' (Renée Fleming, Royal Philharmonic Orchestra)
- Humperdinck: Hansel and Gretel (Milwaukee Symphony Orchestra)
- Mozart/Süssmayr: Requiems (St. Paul Chamber Orchestra)
- Ervín Schulhoff: 'Concertos Alla Jazz'
- Schoeck: Violin Concerto op. 21, Penthesilea-Suite (Swiss Youth Symphony Orchestra)
- Roberto Sierra: Missa Latina "Pro Pace" (Heidi Grant Murphy, soprano; Nathaniel Webster, baritone; Milwaukee Symphony Chorus and Orchestra)

Cultural offices
Preceded by Christof Perick	Generalmusikdirektor, Staatsoper Hannover; 1996-2000	Succeeded by Hans Urbanek
Preceded by Zdeněk Mácal	Music Director, Milwaukee Symphony Orchestra; 1997-2009	Succeeded by Edo de Waart
Preceded by Hugh Wolff	Music Director, Saint Paul Chamber Orchestra; 2001-2004	Succeeded by (no successor)
Preceded by Samuel Wong	Principal Conductor, Honolulu Symphony Orchestra; 2007-2010	Succeeded by JoAnn Falletta (music advisor)
