= Gustav Mahler Conducting Competition =

German conducting competition

The Gustav Mahler Conducting Competition is one of the most important music competitions of its kind worldwide and is held in Bamberg, Germany. Conductors no older than 35 years may enter.

== History ==
The competition was founded by the Bamberg Symphony Orchestra, with the idea of helping young conductors at the start of their conducting careers. The first prize includes a cash prize and engagements with several orchestras.

It started in 2004 with Gustavo Dudamel's decisive win and since then has taken place every three years.

== Winners ==
Year	1st prize	2nd prize	3rd prize	4th prize
2004	(Venezuela) Gustavo Dudamel	(Bulgaria) Ivo Venkov	(Ukraine) Oksana Lyniv (Japan) Toshihiko Matsunuma	Not awarded
2007	Not awarded	(South Korea) Shi-Yeon Sung	(United States) Benjamin Shwartz	(Poland) Ewa Strusińska
2010	(Latvia) Ainars Rubikis	(Uzbekistan) Aziz Shokhakhimov	(Bulgaria) Yordan Kamdzhalov	Not awarded
2013	(Israel) Lahav Shani	(Austria) David Danzmayr (Taiwan) Tung-Chieh Chuang	Not awarded	Not awarded
2016	(Singapore) Kahchun Wong	(Russia) Sergey Neller	(Russia) Valentin Uryupin	Not awarded
2020	(United Kingdom) Finnegan Downie Dear	(Germany) Thomas Jung	(Hong Kong) Wilson Ng (United Kingdom) Harry Ogg (Austria) Katharina Wincor	Not awarded
2023	(Italy) Giuseppe Mengoli	(Japan) / (United States) Taichi Fukumura	(Germany) / (Austria) Georg Köhler	Not awarded
2026	Not awarded	(Poland) Jakub Przybycień	(Italy) Sieva Borzak (France) Simon Clausse	Not awarded

== 2004 ==
Jury

- Marina Mahler (patronesse of the competition and honorary member of the jury)
- Jonathan Nott (principal conductor of the Bamberg Symphony and president of the jury)
- Leon Botstein (principal conductor and artistic director of the American Symphony Orchestra)
- Lawrence Foster (artistic director of Orchestra of the Gulbenkian Foundation Lisbon)
- Esa-Pekka Salonen (chief conductor and artistic director of Los Angeles Philharmonic and composer)
- Magnus Lindberg (composer)
- Paul Müller (managing director and CEO of the Bamberg Symphony)
- Ernest Fleischmann (consultant and former managing director of the San Francisco Symphony)
- Rolf Beck (head of NDR Orchestras and Choir Hamburg and director of the Schleswig-Holstein Music Festival)
- Serge Dorny (general director of L'Opéra National de Lyon)
- Peter Pastreich (consultant)
- Markus Mayers (member of the board of the Bamberg Symphony)

== 2007 ==
The Second Bamberg Symphony Orchestra Gustav Mahler Conducting Competition took place on 23–28 April 2007 at Sinfonie an der Regnitz, Joseph-Keilberth-Saal, Bamberg.

Jury

- Marina Mahler (honorary member)
- Jonathan Nott (jury president; principal conductor, Bamberg Symphony Orchestra)
- Herbert Blomstedt (honorary conductor for Life, Bamberg Symphony Orchestra)
- Hans Graf (music director, Houston Symphony Orchestra)
- Mark-Anthony Turnage (composer)
- Paul Müller (intendant, Bamberg Symphony Orchestra)
- Rolf Beck (intendant, Schleswig-Holstein Music Festival)
- Serge Dorny (director-general, L'Opéra National de Lyon)
- Ernest Fleischmann (consultant)
- Peter Pastreich (consultant)
- Christian Dibbern (member of the orchestra board of the Bamberg Symphony)

== 2010 ==
The 3rd competition took place in Bamberg, Germany, from 26 February to 7 March 2010.

Candidates

- (United States) Elizabeth Askren
- (Germany) Cornelius Heine
- (South Korea) Seokwon Hong
- (Bulgaria) Yordan Kamdzhalov
- (Italy) Francesco Lanzillotta
- (England) (Russia) Alexander Prior
- (Latvia) Ainars Rubikis
- (United States) Scott Seaton
- (Uzbekistan) Aziz Shokakimov
- (Germany) Lam Tran
- (Japan) Kosuke Tsunoda
- (Russia) Xenia Zharko

Jury

- (England) Marina Fistoulari-Mahler (honorary juror)
- (England) Jonathan Nott (president)
- (Sweden) Herbert Blomstedt
- (England) John Carewe
- (Germany) Wolfgang Fink
- (Australia) Jonathan Mills
- (Germany) Jan Nast
- (Germany) Matthias Pintscher
- A member of the Bamberg Symphony Orchestra

Repertoire

- Joseph Haydn: Symphony No. 104
- Gustav Mahler: Symphony No. 4
- Gustav Mahler: A selection from his lieder cycles
- Matthias Pintscher: Towards Osiris
- Anton Webern: Five pieces for orchestra, op.10
- Jörg Widmann: Con brio

== 2013 ==
From 7 to 14 June 2013 the Bamberg Symphony held The Mahler Competition for the fourth time. 407 young conductors applied to compete.

Candidates

- (Taiwan) Tung-Chieh Chuang
- (Austria) David Danzmayr
- (Greece) (Russia) Botinis Dimitris
- (Israel) (France) Gad Kadosh
- (Japan) Yoshinao Kihara
- (Venezuela) Manuel López-Gómez
- (South Korea) June-Sung Park
- (Israel) Lahav Shani
- (Finland) Dalia Stasevska
- (Japan) Yuko Tanaka
- (Greece) Zoi Tsokanou
- (United States) Joseph Young

Jury

- Marina Mahler
- Jonathan Nott
- Markus Stenz
- John Carewe
- Rolf Wallin
- Louwrens Langevoort
- Jonathan Mills
- Albert Schmitt
- Wolfgang Fink
- Christian Dibbern

Repertoire

- Gustav Mahler: Symphony No. 1 D major, 1st movement and Symphony No. 6 A minor, 2nd and 3rd movement; Song of a Wayfarer; "Ich bin der Welt abhanden gekommen" from the Rückert song cycle
- Joseph Haydn: Symphony No. 92 G major Hob. I:92
- Alban Berg: Lyrische Suite. Three Pieces for String Orchestra, 1928
- György Ligeti: Melodies for Orchestra, 1971
- Rolf Wallin: Act for Orchestra, 2003

== 2016 ==
From 6 to 13 May 2016 the Bamberg Symphony held The Mahler Competition for the fifth time. Out of 381 applicants from 64 countries, 14 candidates were invited to Bamberg, 11 male and 3 female.

Candidates

- (Venezuela) Rodolfo Barráez
- (Romania) Gabriel Bebeselea
- (Chile) Paolo Bortolameolli
- (China) Tong Chen
- (Poland) Anna Duczmal-Mróz
- (Japan) Keitaro Harada
- (Germany) Georg Köhler
- (Russia) Sergey Neller
- (New Zealand) Gemma New
- (South Korea) Eunseok Seo
- (Russia) Valentin Uryupin
- (Romania) Vlad Vizireanu
- (Singapore) Wong Kah Chun
- (United States) David Yi

Jury

- Jonathan Nott (president of the jury, former principal conductor of the Bamberg Symphony)
- Marina Mahler (honorary member)
- Marcus Rudolf Axt (chief executive of the Bamberg Symphony)
- Jiří Bělohlávek (conductor)
- John Carewe (conductor)
- Sir Neville Marriner (conductor)
- Barbara Hannigan (conductor and soprano)
- Jörg Widmann (conductor and composer)
- Deborah Borda (president and CEO of the Los Angeles Philharmonic)
- Martin Campbell-White (artist consultant)
- Ara Guzelimian (provost and dean of The Juilliard School)
- Boris-Alexander Jusa (member of the Bamberg Symphony)

Repertoire

- Henri Dutilleux: Correspondances
- Joseph Haydn: Mourning Symphony
- Gustav Mahler: Symphony No. 3
- Anton Webern: Six Pieces for Orchestra
- Jörg Widmann: Bavarian-Babylonian March

Prizes

- 1st Prize, € 20,000
- 2nd Prize, € 10,000
- 3rd Prize, € 5,000

== 2020 ==
From 29 June to 5 July 2020 the Bamberg Symphony held The Mahler Competition for the sixth time. From 336 applicants 12 candidates where chosen to participate in the competition in Bamberg.

Candidates

- Yeo Ryeong Ahn
- Finnegan Downie Dear
- Killian Farrell
- Orr Guy
- Andreas Hansson
- Thomas Jung
- Piero Lombardi Iglesias
- Wilson Ng
- Harry Ogg
- Mikhail Shekhtman
- Christian Vasquez
- Katharina Wincor

Jury

- Marina Mahler (patronesse of the competition and honorary member of the jury)
- Jakub Hrůša (principal conductor of the Bamberg Symphony and president of the jury)
- Pamela Rosenberg (former managing director and CEO of the Berlin Philharmonic)
- John Carewe (conductor)
- Martin Campbell-White (consultant and founder of Askonas Holt and president of the Mahler Foundation Santa Cruz USA)
- Ara Guzelimian (provost and dean, The Juilliard School, and artistic director of the Ojai Music Festival)
- Barbara Hannigan (conductor and singer)
- Lahav Shani (chief conductor of the Rotterdam Philharmonic Orchestra and music director designate of the Israel Philharmonic Orchestra)
- Juanjo Mena (principal conductor of the Cincinnati May Festival and associate conductor of the Spanish National Orchestra)
- Mark Stringer (professor for orchestra conducting at the University of Music and Performing Arts, Vienna)
- Miroslav Srnka (composer)
- Marcus Axt (managing director and CEO of the Bamberg Symphony)
- Martin Timphus (member of the orchestral board of Bamberg Symphony)

Repertoire

- Gustav Mahler: Symphony Nr. 4 G Major for Soprano and Orchestra
- Wolfgang Amadeus Mozart: Symphony Nr. 26 E Major KV 184
- Anton Webern: Variations for Orchestra op. 30
- Helmut Lachenmann: "Tableau"
- Miroslav Srnka: move 04 "Memory Full" (world premiere)

Prizes

- 1st Prize € 30,000
- 2nd Prize € 20,000
- 3rd Prize € 10,000

== 2023 ==
From 7 to 13 July 2023 the Bamberg Symphony held The Mahler Competition for the seventh time. Out of 350 applicants from 57 countries, 19 candidates were invited to Bamberg, 15 male and 4 female.

=== Candidates ===
- Barbara Dragan
- Kevin Fitzgerald
- Taichi Fukumura
- Mirian Khukhunaishvili
- Zofia Kiniorska
- Georg Köhler
- Polina Lebedieva
- Samuel Seungwon Lee
- Sora Elisabeth Lee
- Nils Erik Måseidvåg
- Giuseppe Mengoli
- Tristan Rais-Sherman
- IIya Ram
- Matthew Rhodes
- Alexey Rubin
- Mikhail Shekhtman
- Dayner Tafur-Díaz
- Benjamin Perry Wenzelberg
- Su-Han Yang

=== Jury ===
- Marina Mahler
- Jakub Hrůša
- Thomas Hampson
- Barbara Hannigan
- Juanjo Mena
- Miroslav Srnka
- John Storgards
- Deborah Borda
- Martin Campbell-White
- John Carewe
- Ara Guzelimian
- Pamela Rosenberg
- Mark Stringer
- Marcus Rudolf Axt
- Mayra Budagjan

Repertoire

- Gustav Mahler: Symphony No. 7
- Joseph Haydn: Symphony No. 92 in G major, Hoboken I/92
- Alban Berg: Seven Early Songs
- Igor Stravinsky: Violin Concerto in D
- Bernd Richard Deutsch: New work for orchestra (world premiere, commissioned by the Bamberg Symphony)

Prizes

- 1st prize: € 30,000
- 2nd prize: € 20,000
- 3rd prize: € 10,000
