= Roger Rooman =

Australian classical composer (1948–1996)

Roger Laurent Rooman
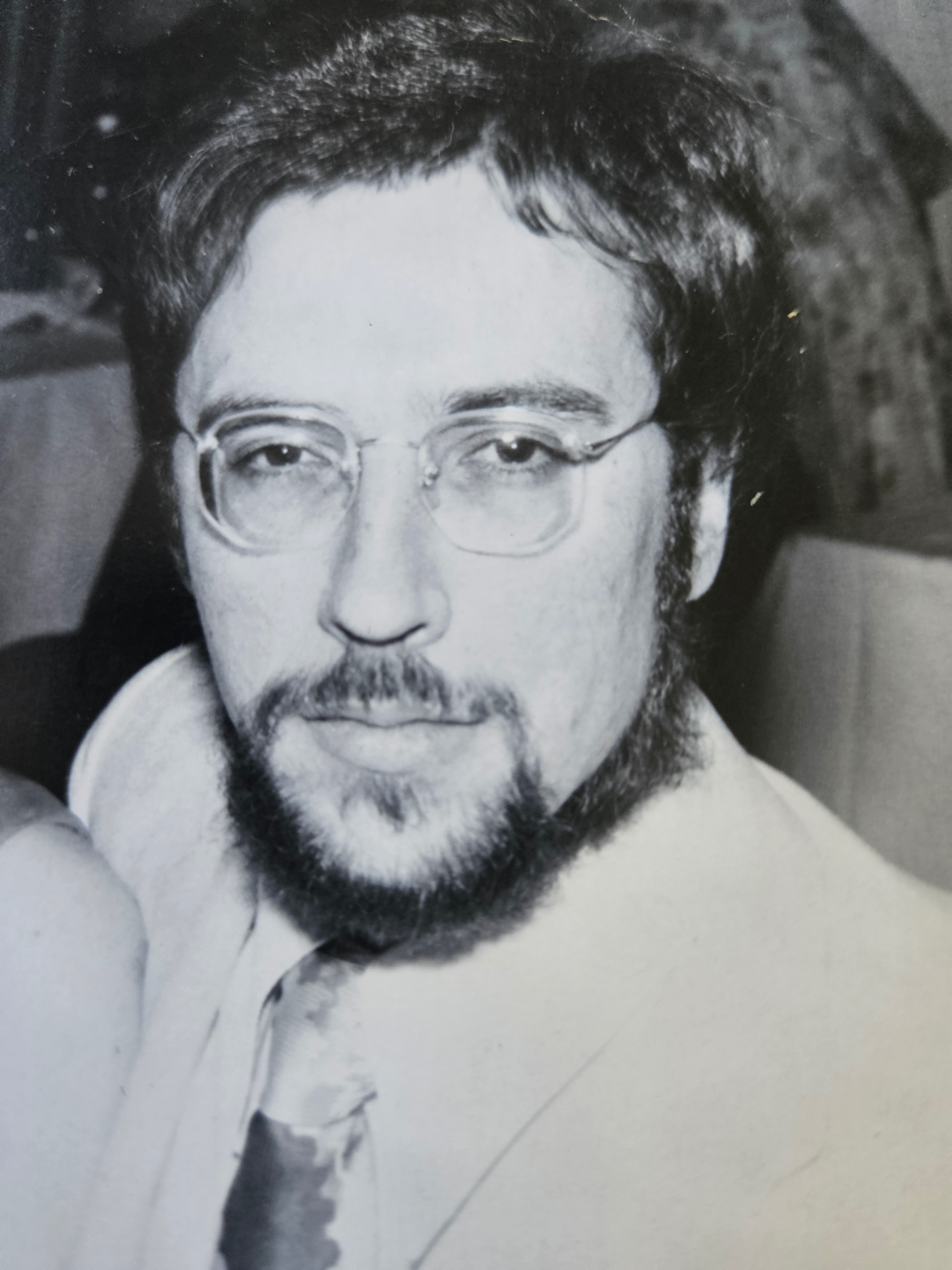
- Born: 24 July 1948; Maldon, Victoria, Australia
- Died: 15 August 1996 (aged 48); Melbourne
- Occupation: Composer of classical music
- Spouse: Bianca Rooman

Roger Laurent Rooman (24 July 1948 – 15 August 1996) was an Australian composer of classical music, known for his orchestral and chamber works, particularly for string instruments. His compositions span from mid-1965 until his death. They are considered unique and original, untraceable to any school or style.

== Early life and education ==
Rooman was born in Maldon, Victoria. His forbears were from France, Belgium and England. He spent most of his life in Melbourne. He studied mathematics and science at Monash University. Rooman developed an interest in classical music during his teenage years and decided to pursue composition. After receiving some initial instruction from a family friend, he continued largely as a self-taught composer.

== Compositional history ==
Rooman's earliest known composition is a Tone poem in A minor for orchestra, written in 1965. A little later he composed tone poems in E minor, C-sharp minor, and D minor and a clarinet quintet in B minor. From 1969, Rooman began to evolve his style, moving away from traditional, strict key centers toward a more flexible harmonic approach. While his music became more experimental and complex, he stopped short of full atonality, ensuring the music still retained a sense of a central "home" tone rather than becoming completely dissonant. This transitional period is exemplified by his work Homage to Edgar Allan Poe, written for flute, harpsichord, and string quartet. In 1974 he began a chamber symphony, which he never finished. Around the same time, he composed Overture, Fantastico and Epilogue for chamber orchestra, completed in 1976. Rooman continued to compose large-scale works in continuous form instead of using separate movements. His String Quartet in One Movement (1973) lasted an unconventional 45 minutes. A similar approach is evident in Prelude, Aria and Sinfonia for string orchestra, which is a non-stop single unified work. It was dedicated to his wife, Bianca. Composer and conductor Christopher Lyndon-Gee describes this work as a work of

... Courage, vision (and) imagination. This is music that carries eternal values and a bold spiritual quest. Probably no composer other than Sibelius can be compared... Rooman is inexorable, effortful and searching ...

Rooman's orchestral works often feature unique instrumentation; for example, Passage (1977) uses a trumpet and two cornets doubling flugelhorn instead of the standard three trumpets to create a specific tone colour. Despite not being a string player himself, much of his music focuses on strings—particularly the cello—displaying a deep technical understanding of these instruments. The period between 1977 and 1985 was his most productive. His only vocal work, Swinburne Love Songs (1977), sets texts by Algernon Charles Swinburne. During this time he also completed several major orchestral works, including Midday Miracles (c. 1979). Prelude, Aria and Sinfonia (1983) is regarded as one of his most ambitious works for string orchestra. One of his final compositions, Arioso in Alto (Sky Bridge) (1992), is a short rhapsodic work for string orchestra and is often considered representative of his mature style.

== Performance history ==
Performances of Rooman's music occurred in Australia. In 1987 his work, Passage was premiered by the Adelaide Symphony Orchestra. Other of his works were published by Musica Australiana Press in Victoria. In 1992 Passage was also performed by the Slovak Radio Symphony Orchestra of Bratislava conducted by Szymon Kawalla. The performance was recorded in the Vienna Modern Masters, 1993 CD, Music from Six Continents series. Rooman's composition Arioso in Alto was performed in Belgrade and in Ecuador. From 1992 to 1993 Rooman was composer-in-residence at Mishkenot Sha'ananim, a colony just outside the old city wall in Jerusalem. In 1991, his work Prelude, Aria and Sinfonia was performed and recorded by the Amadeus Chamber Orchestra at the Church of the Carmelites in Poznań in Poland conducted by Agnieszka Duczmal. In February 1994, selections of his works were performed by the National Symphony Orchestra of Cuba conducted by Christopher Lyndon-Gee.

== Notable works ==
- Tone poem in A minor (1965) – orchestra
- Tone poems in E minor, C-sharp minor, and D minor (1960s) – orchestra
- Clarinet Quintet in B minor (1960s) – chamber music
- String Quartet in One Movement (1973) – string quartet
- Chamber Symphony (begun 1974, unfinished) – chamber orchestra
- Overture, Fantastico and Epilogue (1976) – chamber orchestra
- Swinburne Love Songs (1977) – voice and ensemble
- Passage (1977) – orchestra
- Midday Miracles (c. 1979) – orchestra
- Prelude, Aria and Sinfonia (1983) – string orchestra
- Arioso in Alto (Sky Bridge) (1992) – string orchestra
