= Katharina Wincor =

Austrian conductor (born 1995)

Katharina Wincor (born March 30, 1995, in Vöcklabruck) is an Austrian conductor.

== Life and Career ==
Katharina Wincor grew up in a musical family in Upper Austria. As a child, she learned to play the violin, piano, and oboe. After attending the Musikgymnasium Linz, she began studying orchestral conducting under Mark Stringer at the University of Music and Performing Arts Vienna in 2014. In 2018, she continued her studies at the Zurich University of the Arts in the class of Johannes Schlaefli. She also received instruction through masterclasses with Riccardo Muti, Jaap van Zweden, Robert Spano, and David Zinman.

Drawing on her experience as a singer with the Arnold Schoenberg Choir in Vienna—where she had served as an assistant to Erwin Ortner since 2016—she was invited in 2022 to prepare the Accentus Choir Paris for a performance of Beethoven’s Missa solemnis.

Wincor gained international recognition in 2019 when she was appointed Assistant Conductor of the Dallas Symphony Orchestra, working alongside Music Director Fabio Luisi.

In 2020, she won third prize at the Gustav Mahler Conducting Competition in Bamberg and was invited to a masterclass with the Royal Concertgebouw Orchestra, Amsterdam, and Iván Fischer. Fischer subsequently engaged her as an assistant for several productions with the Budapest Festival Orchestra.

Since then, she has made guest appearances conducting orchestras worldwide, including the Bruckner Orchestra Linz, Klangforum Wien, Vienna Symphony, Graz Philharmonic, Carinthian Symphony Orchestra, Vienna Jeunesse Orchestra, Deutsches Symphonie-Orchester Berlin, Frankfurt Opera and Museum Orchestra, Dresden Philharmonic, SWR Symphony Orchestra, Bamberg Symphony, Deutsche Radio Philharmonie Saarbrücken Kaiserslautern, São Paulo State Symphony Orchestra, Phoenix Symphony Orchestra, Royal Bangkok Symphony Orchestra, Cincinnati Symphony Orchestra, Naples Philharmonic Orchestra, Spanish Radio Symphony Orchestra, Orchestre National du Capitole de Toulouse, Yomiuri Nippon Symphony Orchestra, Queensland Symphony Orchestra, Romanian Radio National Orchestra, Ensemble Reflektor, and others.

At the 2022 Salzburg Festival, she conducted the children's opera Der Teufel mit den drei goldenen Haaren (The Devil with the Three Golden Hairs) by Stefan Johannes Hanke. In September 2025, she opened the International Bruckner Festival 2025 at the Brucknerhaus in Linz, conducting the Upper Austrian Youth Symphony Orchestra.

== Awards ==
- 2020: Gustav Mahler Conducting Competition Bamberg (3rd Prize)
