= Subcarpathian Philharmonic =

Coordinates: 50.0335°N 22.0042°E

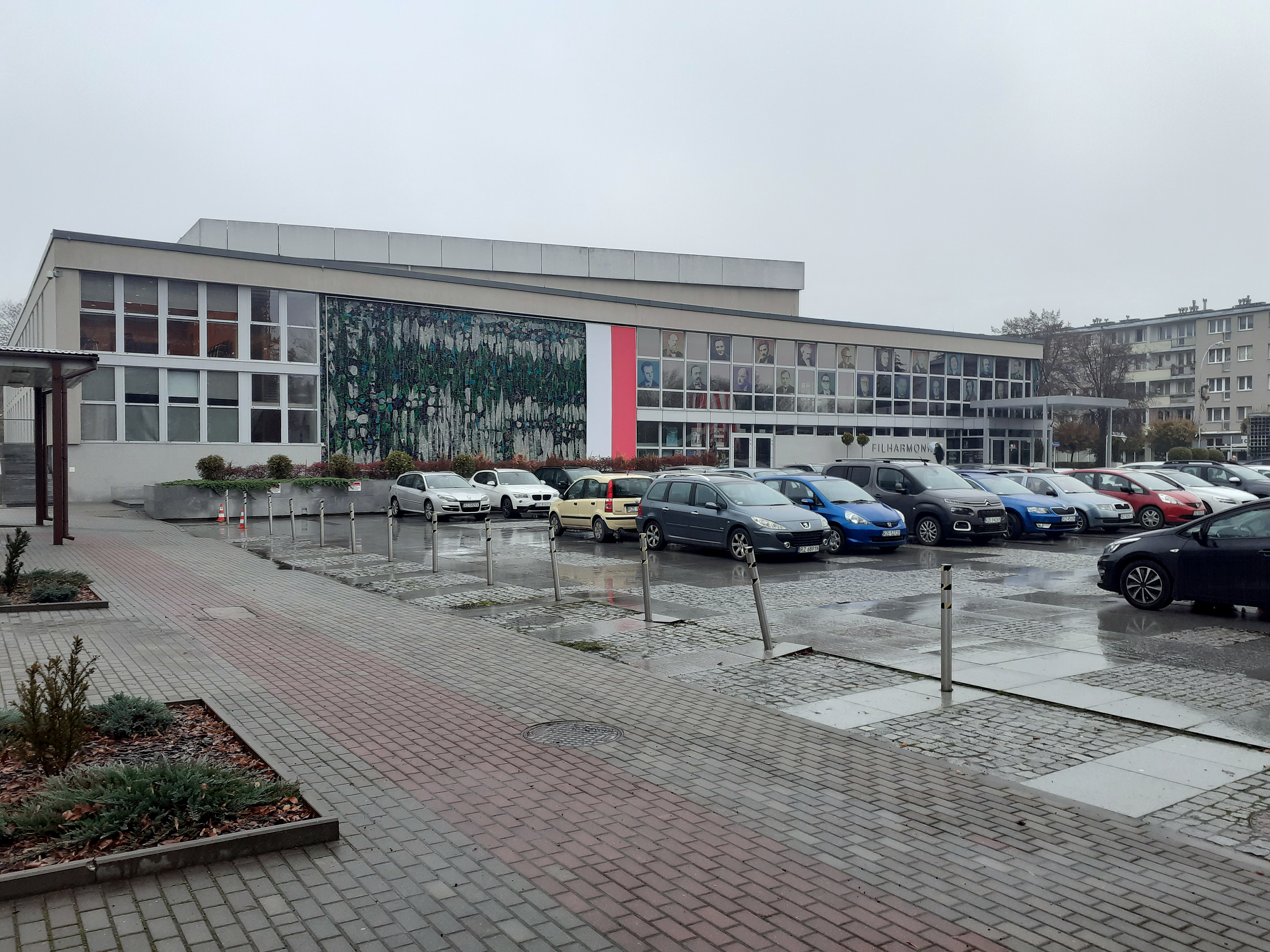
Subcarpathian Philharmonic (2022)

Artur Malawski Podkarpackie Philharmonic in Rzeszów (Polish: ''Filharmonia Podkarpacka im. Artura Malawskiego''; also known as the Subcarpathian Philharmonic) is a philharmonic institution based at 30 Chopina Street in Rzeszów, Poland. Its origins date to 1955, when the Voivodeship Symphony Orchestra debuted; the institution adopted its current name in 2010. The Philharmonic organises the Music Festival in Łańcut, one of the country’s longest-running classical music festivals.

== History ==
The origins of the institution date back to 1955, when the Voivodeship Symphony Orchestra was founded in Rzeszów. Its first concert took place on 29 April 1955 with the participation of pianist Adam Harasiewicz. From September 1955 the artistic director was Janusz Ambros. In 1958 the ensemble was nationalized and renamed the State Symphony Orchestra. In 1967 it was reorganized as the Rzeszów Philharmonic named after Artur Malawski.

In January 1974 construction was completed on the new building at 30 Fryderyk Chopin Street, which became the seat of the philharmonic. In 2009–2010 both concert halls underwent a major renovation and modernization. After the completion of the works, in 2010, the Rzeszów Philharmonic adopted its current name: Artur Malawski Podkarpackie Philharmonic.

== Building and halls ==
Following the 2009–2010 modernisation, the Concert Hall has 684 seats and the Chamber Hall 185 seats. The main hall allows for a configurable stage with stage lifts and an optional orchestra pit.

== Activities ==
The institution presents symphonic, chamber and oratorio-cantata programmes, as well as staged productions within the BOOM cycle (ballet, opera, operetta, musical).

Over the years, the orchestra's artistic leadership has included Janusz Ambros, Stanisław Michalek, Andrzej Rozmarynowicz, Bogdan Olędzki, Józef Radwan, Adam Natanek, Tadeusz Wojciechowski, Jerzy Kosek, Marek Pijarowski and Vladimir Kiradjiev; in the more recent period, Massimiliano Caldi has been listed as the orchestra's first conductor. The orchestra has worked with numerous conductors from Poland and abroad, including Tadeusz Strugała, Jerzy Katlewicz, Jerzy Maksymiuk, Gabriel Chmura, Nayden Todorov, Marek Pijarowski, Wojciech Rajski, Agnieszka Duczmal, Wojciech Michniewski, Krzysztof Penderecki, Łukasz Borowicz, Gintaras Rinkevičius and Carlo Scaglione.

== Education ==
The Philharmonic runs school outreach concerts and family programmes as part of its longstanding music education offer. Educational events form a regular component of the artistic season in the region.

== Łańcut Music Festival ==
The Philharmonic is the organizer and host of the Łańcut Music Festival – an event initiated by Janusz Ambros, whose first edition, the Days of Chamber Music, was held in 1961. Over the years the festival has developed into an international event hosting leading artists. Subsequent editions take place in the Ballroom of the Łańcut Castle Museum as well as in the Concert Hall of the Podkarpackie Philharmonic. In 2025 the festival held its 64th edition.

== Management ==
Since 2008 the director has been Prof. Marta Katarzyna Wierzbieniec.
