= Christian Ehwald =

German conductor

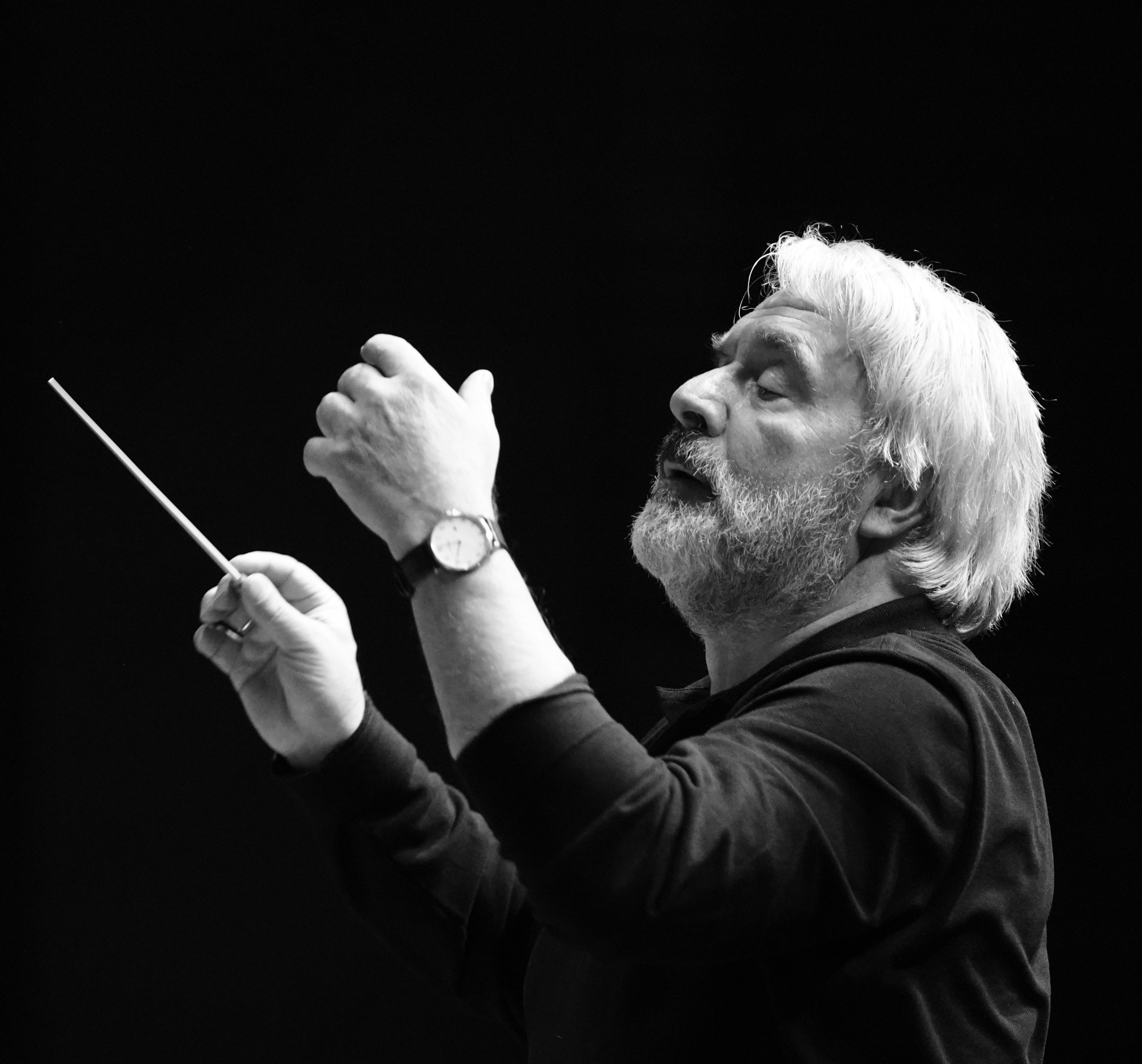
Christian Ehwald, 2019.

Christian Ehwald (born 1953 in Eberswalde) is a German conductor and academic teacher.

== Life ==
Ehwald studied at the Hochschule für Musik "Hanns Eisler" with the conductor Horst Förster from 1973 to 1978. Later, he continued his studies at the Saint Petersburg Conservatory N.A. Rimsky Korssakov with Arvid Jansons and Mariss Jansons.

From 1981 until 1988, he was principal conductor of the Jena Philharmonic.

From 1981, he was guest conductor among others with the Berliner Philharmoniker, the Staatskapelle Dresden, the symphony orchestras of the Bavarian Radio, the West German Radio and the Central German Radio, the Radio Symphony Orchestra Berlin, the Petersburg Philharmonic, the NHK Symphony Orchestra Tokyo, the Yomiuri Nippon Symphony Orchestra Tokyo and many others.

From 1998 to 2002, he was music director at the Opera House Magdeburg and chief conductor of the Magdeburg Philharmonic Orchestra.

In 2002, he received an appointment at the Hochschule für Musik "Hanns Eisler" and at the same time took over the direction of the university orchestra. His students won several 1st prizes at important international competitions:

- 4. Bamberger Symphoniker#Dirigentenwettbewerb 2013: Lahav Shani
- 5. Gustav-Mahler-Wettbewerb der Bamberger Symphoniker 2016: Wong Kah Chun
- 6. International Conducting Competition Sir Georg Solti 2012: Lin Day
- 56. International Besançon Competition for Young Conductors 2019: Nodoka Okisawa
- 9. Donatella Flick LSO Conducting Competition 2006: Michal Dworzynski
- 4. Jorma Panula Conducting Competition 2009: Yordan Kamdzhalov
- 18. Tokyo International Music Competition for Conducting 2018: Nodoka Okisawa
- 9. Deutscher Dirigentenpreis 2013: Kristiina Poska

Ehwald has worked frequently with the Staatsoper Berlin and the Gewandhaus Leipzig Orchestra]and has toured with the Berlin Staatskapelle to England, Australia and New Zealand. He has conducted various television productions among others with the NHK Symphony Orchestra Tokyo, the Saint Petersburg Philharmonic Orchestra, the RAI National Symphony Orchestra Rome, the Slovak Philharmonic Orchestra, the Zagreb Radio Symphony Orchestra, the Prague Symphony Orchestra and the Bavarian Radio Symphony Orchestra.

Between 2008 and 2014, Ehwald was also music director of the Shenzhen Symphony Orchestra, China.

Ehwald is married to musicologist Tatjana Ehwald. They have two daughters: music journalist Mascha Drost and pianist Natalia Ehwald.

== Awards ==
- 1979: 3rd prize at the 6th Herbert von Karajan Conducting Competition
- 2000: Wagner production of the year for the Walküre in Magdeburg (director: Christian Kube) of the magazine Opernwelt.
- 2005: Preis der deutschen Schallplattenkritik 3/2005 und Supersonic-Award of the Pizzicato (magazine) 9/2005 für die Gesamteinspielung der Violinkonzerte by Hans Werner Henze with Torsten Jannicke.
- 2015: Ehrendirigent des Shenzhen Symphony Orchestra

== Recordings ==
- Aram Khachaturian, Cellokonzert e-Moll, with Xenia Jankovic (violoncello), RTS Radio Symphony Orchestra, conductors Christian Ehwald and Dejan Savic. Calliope Records 2020.
- Hans Werner Henze: Violinkonzerte 1–3, Magdeburgische Philharmonie, conductor: Christian Ehwald, soloist: Torsten Jannicke. Musikproduktion Dabringhaus und Grimm 2005.
- MUSIC for you: Brahms • Dvořák • Fibich • Grieg • Khachaturian • Schumann • Sibelius • Smetana • Suk • Tchaikovsky, Staatliche Slowakische Philharmonie Košice, direction Christian Ehwald; Opus 1990.
- Jaan Rääts: Sinfonie Nr. 8 Op. 74, Béla Bartók: Konzert für Orchester. Magdeburgische Philharmonie, conductor: Christian Ehwald. Antes Edition 2003.
- Wort und Musik. Tschernobyl-Konzert in der Philharmonie Berlin. Zum 20. Jahrestag, with Therese Affolter, Christian Brückner, Thomas Quasthoff, the Scharoun Ensemble Berlin, Sinfonieorchester der Hochschule für Musik Hanns Eisler Berlin, conductor: Christian Ehwald. IPNNW 2006.
- Alexander von Zemlinsky: Lyrische Sinfonie. Bella Musica 2001.
