= Yordan Kamdzhalov =

Bulgarian conductor & music director (born 1980)

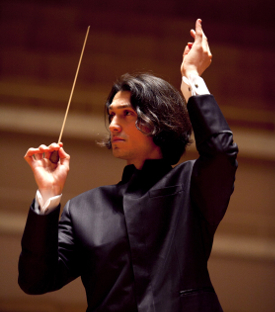
- Conducting Berlin Philharmonic in 2007
- Born: October 16, 1980 (age 45); Turgovishte, Bulgaria
- Website: https://kamdzhalov.com/

Yordan Kamdzhalov (Bulgarian: Йордан Камджалов) is a Bulgarian conductor and music director.

Kamdzhalov is a laureate Jorma Panula and Gustav Mahler international conducting competitions and served as general music director of Theater & Orchester Heidelberg. Throughout his career he has collaborated with a range of international orchestras including the Los Angeles Philharmonic, Philharmonia Orchestra London, German Symphony Orchestra Berlin, Tonhalle Orchestra Zurich, Konzerthausorchester Berlin and New Japan Philharmonic. In the opera sector, he conducted performances at, among others, Komische Oper Berlin and Theater Magdeburg, earning him a nomination as 'Best Opera Conductor of the Year' by Deutschlandradio Kultur. As of 2015, Kamdzhalov is the Artistic Director and Principal Conductor of the Bulgarian Genesis Orchestra and Music Laboratory for the Human Self.

== Early life ==
=== Education ===
Kamdzhalov began piano lessons as a child at the cultural community center in Turgovishte, guided by his mother, a music teacher. In 1999, Kamdzhalov began to study conducting at the Sofia Conservatory under Vassil Kazandjiev and continued at the Hanns Eisler University of Music in Berlin under Christian Ehwald, simultaneously completing training as a choir conductor. He was selected to work over an extended period with the Philharmonia and London Philharmonic Orchestras, which led to his collaboration with well-established conducting mentors including Lorin Maazel, Vladimir Jurowski and Esa Pekka Salonen. During his training he also served as a lecturer in Early music at the National Academy of Music (Bulgaria). In 2007, he began to develop his own mathematical interpretation of musical scores by transforming them into structures of eighths, which facilitated memorization and allowed him to focus on communication while conducting.

=== Career ===
In 2006, Kamdzhalov became artistic director and principal conductor of the international Berlin Ensemble Innorelatio and served as musical director at the Schlosstheater Rheinsberg from 2007 to 2009. In 2011, he was appointed Chief Conductor of the opera, the philharmonic orchestra and the Schloss festival in Heidelberg. The seasons realized during his tenure were the most financially successful in the history of Theater & Orchester Heidelberg. He chose not to extend his contract beyond 2014, but he remained as principal guest conductor for the following season. His rendition of Bruckner’s Symphony No.3 at his final concert in Heidelberg as General Music Director prompted a critic from Bachtrack to write: “I have now heard many performances of the finale, including that by Sir Simon Rattle and the Berlin Philharmonic, but at this point Kamdzhalov outshone them all.”

In 2014, IAU and NASA named a minor planet 52292 Kamdzhalov, stating that "he connects the world of music with the fascination for the universe." The same year the publishing house Sagner released the book "Sound Worlds: Conductor Yordan Kamdzhalov" about Kamdzhalov's music and philosophy.

As of 2018 he has been appointed music director and chief conductor of the opera house in Rijeka, Croatian National Theatre Ivan Zajc.

=== Аwards (highlights) ===
- 2009 - first prize at the fourth international orchestra conducting competition 'Jorma Panula' in Vaasa (Finland)
- 2010 - third prize at the third international conducting competition 'Gustav Mahler' in Bamberg (Germany)
- 2010 - nominated as 'Best Opera Conductor of the Year' by Deutschlandradio Kultur for conducting the production "Carmen" at the Theater Magdeburg
- 2011 - 'Musician of the Year' award from the Bulgarian National Radio
- 2013 - nominated from Opernwelt in the category of 'best performance' for the premiere of Wolfgang Rihm's opera 'Dionysos' at the Heidelberg Opera
- 2014 - "Music Critics’ Award" at the 24th Central European Music Festival (Slovakia)
- 2015 - Honorary award 'Ambassador for Bulgarian Culture Worldwide' from Superbrands

== Work at Foundation Yordan Kamdzhalov ==
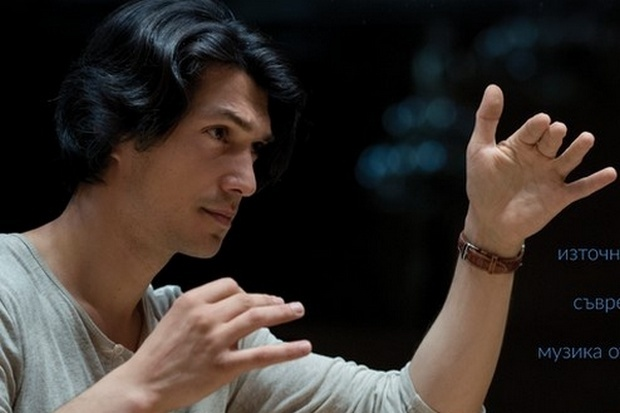
Yordan Kamdzhalov at work in Bulgaria

Kamdzhalov is the co-founder and president of the Foundation Yordan Kamdzhalov, established in 2010 with a stated goal of supporting young Bulgarian talents and preserving Bulgaria's musical traditions. The foundation's activities gradually led to the creation of the socio-cultural platform, including theYoung Artists Competition, Music Laboratory for the Human Self, Genesis Orchestra, Academia Musica, and Interdisciplinary Artists.

=== Genesis Orchestra ===
In 2016, Kamdzhalov became artistic director and chief conductor of the new Genesis Orchestra, featuring musicians and soloists from Bulgaria, Europe, America, and Asia. The orchestra's debut concert at Gasteig, recorded for the German label cpo, was perceived as 'a new chapter in our cultural heritage'.

In 2017, Kamdzhalov received the Echo Klassik prize for Concerto Recording of the Year (20th/21st Century category), alongside the piano duo Genova & Dimitrov. In 2018 he led the Genesis Orchestra for a concert in National Palace of Culture, Bulgaria, featuring Lisa Gerrard in Górecki's Symphony No.3 and Vehadi improvisation on music by Beinsa Duno, later released internationally on CD.

=== Music Laboratory for the Human Self ===
In 2014, Kamdzhalov assumed the roles of artistic director and principal conductor as well as participant in the Music Laboratory for the Human Self, a conceptual platform unfolded in three choral formats: Choir, Ensemble and Bulgaria Sings. The Choir acts as the resident choir for the symphonic Genesis Orchestra. The vocal Ensemble's repertoire includes music styles from antiquity to the 21st century, interwoven with fragments and motifs of Bulgarian folklore. Bulgaria Sings provides a platform for people to gather, sing, and collaborate at significant historical and cultural-educational sites across Bulgaria. In 2018, Kamdzhalov conducted the debut of the Music Laboratory for the Human Self (Chore and Ensemble), accompanied by the Genesis Orchestra, at Wiener Musikverein in an sound-spatial performance featuring motifs and music by Peter Deunov.

=== Academy for the Human Self ===
In the spring of 2024, the "Yordan Kamdzhalov" launched the Academy for the Human Self - an interdisciplinary educational center consisting of training on Science (mathematics and physics), Art (theory of music, piano, violin, percussion instruments and dance) and Sport (chess and table tennis). Kamdzhalov envisioned the Academy for the Human Self as a platform for enhancing individuals' overall intelligence, regardless of age.

In April 2024, Kamdzhalov announced the latest concert-spectacle with the Genesis Orchestra, Music Laboratory (Choir and Ensemble), Eastern Quartet (Switzerland) and Sofi Marinova, titled Mystery and Freedom. Combining classical music, romances, and folklore, the concert will flow continuously through 'sound, musical, tunnel transitions' as he described them.

== Vision ==
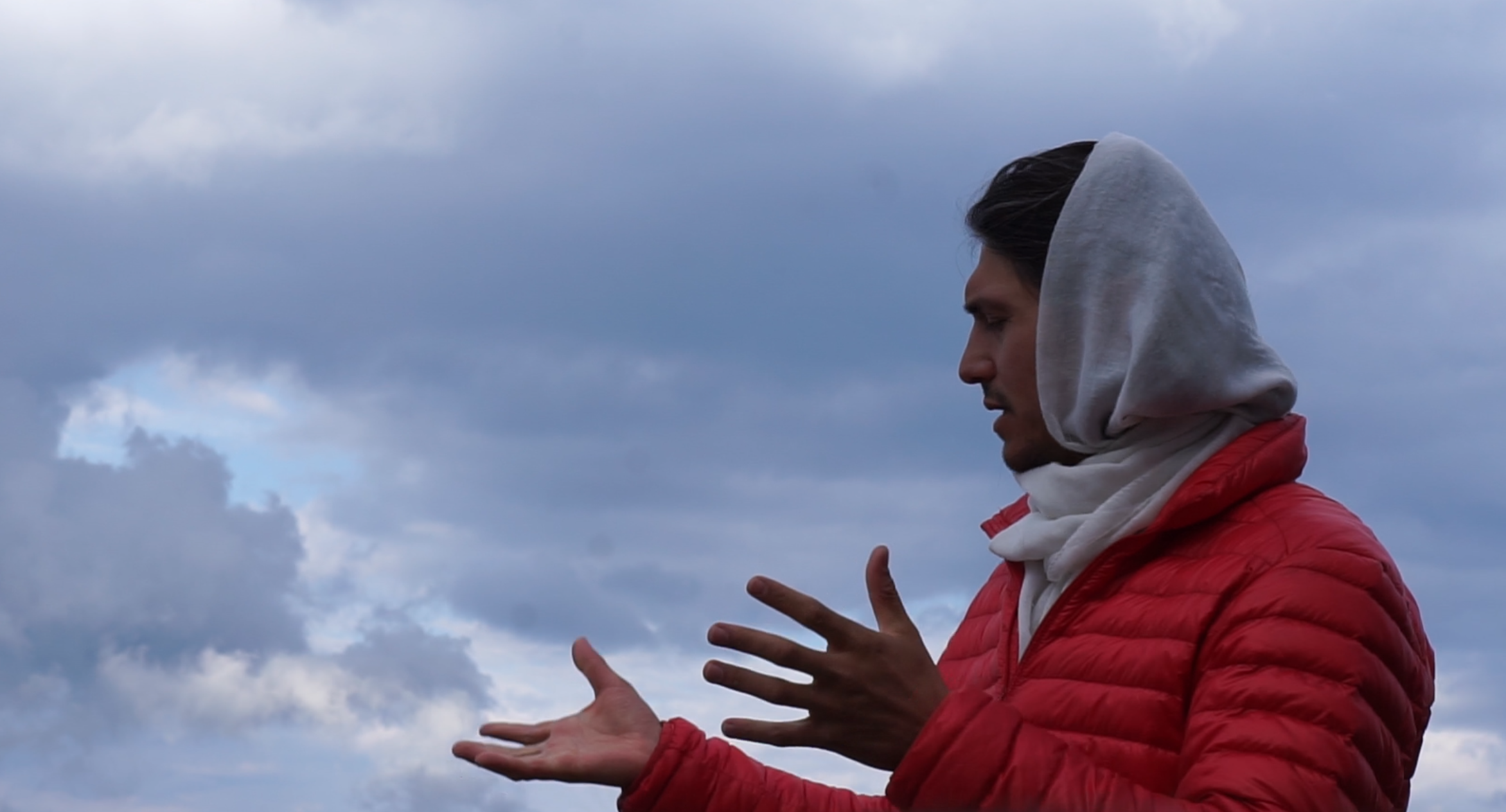
Kamdzhalov lecturing on Beinsa Douno's music at Seven Rila Lakes, Bulgaria, 2016

Recognizing the potential of Bulgarian music and talent to enrich global culture, Kamdzhalov considers the expansion of his projects in Bulgaria in recent years a paramount endeavor. He established the Genesis Orchestra with the mission to 'create pulses' in cultural space, uncovering deeper layers within individuals and tapping into the inner power of the human self. He perceives Music Laboratory for the Human Self as a platform for surpassing conventional performance paradigms by shifting the focus from the musical elements to the interpreter. Kamdzhalow regards the interpretation of Deunov's music in the project Etudes of the Future as a pinnacle of creative freedom and the work of his life. Describing his nearly two-decade exploration as "music of absolute content", he continues to shape his visionary ideas into reality.
