= Crivitz =

Town in Mecklenburg-Vorpommern, Germany

- Town
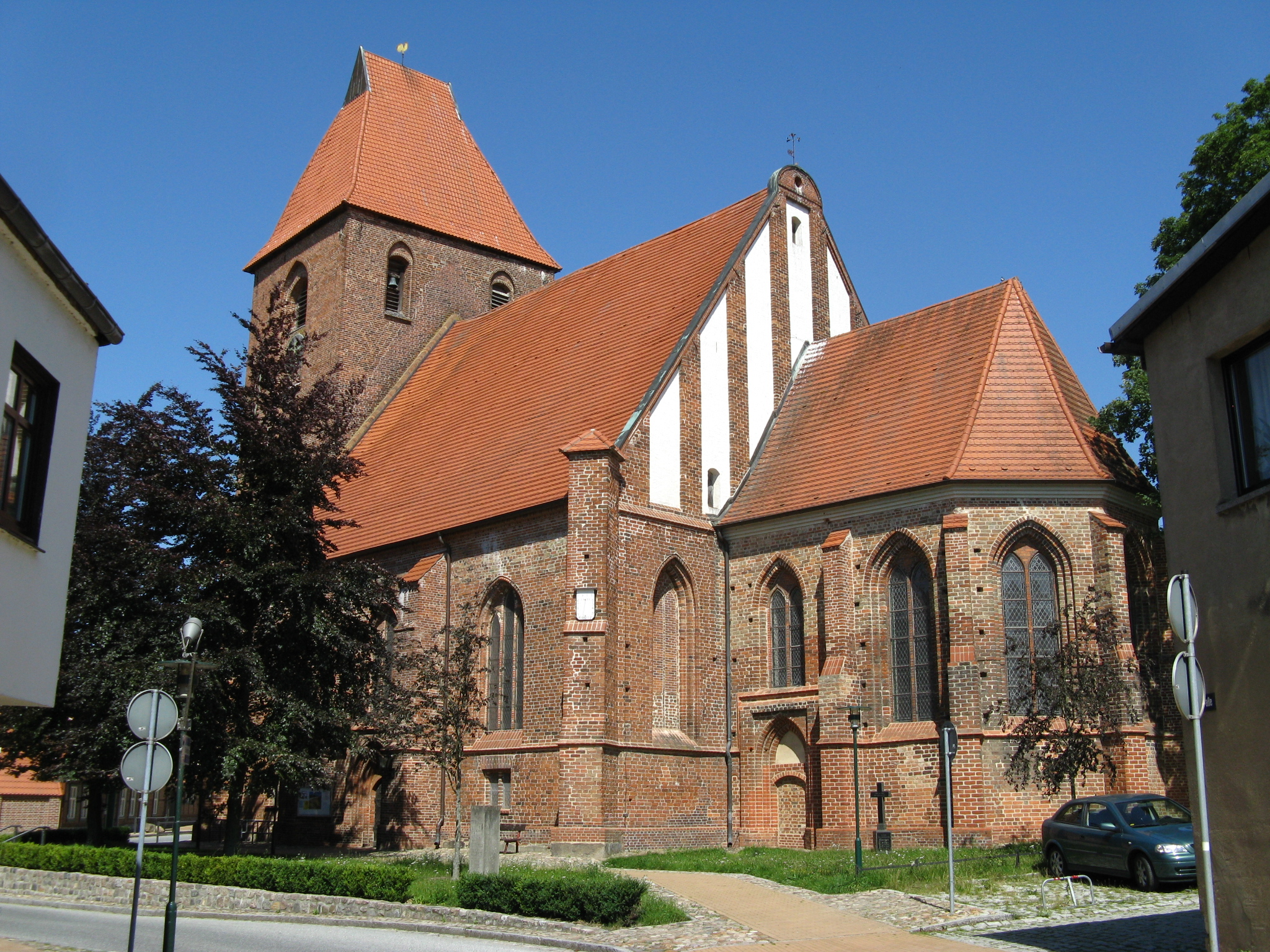
- Church

- Coat of arms

- Location of Crivitz within Ludwigslust-Parchim district
- Interactive map of Crivitz
- Location within Germany Location within Mecklenburg-Vorpommern
- Coordinates: 53°35′N 11°39′E
- Country: Germany
- State: Mecklenburg-Vorpommern
- District: Ludwigslust-Parchim
- Municipal assoc.: Crivitz
- Subdivisions: 6

Government
  - Mayor: Britta Busch-Gramm

Area
  - Total: 75.87 km^{2} (29.29 sq mi)
- Elevation: 40 m (130 ft)

Population (2025-12-31)
  - Total: 4,566
  - Density: 60.18/km^{2} (155.9/sq mi)
- Time zone: UTC+01:00 (CET)
  - Summer (DST): UTC+02:00 (CEST)
- Postal codes: 19089
- Dialling codes: 03863
- Vehicle registration: PCH, LUP, LBZ, HGN, STB, LWL
- Website: www.crivitz.de

Crivitz (German pronunciation: [ˈkʁiːvɪts]) is a town in the Ludwigslust-Parchim district, in Mecklenburg-Western Pomerania, Germany. It is situated 18 km east of Schwerin. The founder of the town Crivitz, Wisconsin named it after his hometown Crivitz. It has a friendship link with Seaford, East Sussex. The lake Barniner See is located nearby.

== Sons and daughters of the city ==
- Kurt Dunkelmann (1906–1983), shipbuilder
- Lutz Dettmann (born 1961), writer
- Christoph Schulze (born 1965), politician (BVB/FW)
- Heiko Mathias Förster (born 1966), conductor, conducted the Munich Symphony Orchestra from 1999 to 2006,

=== Sport ===
- Karla Roffeis (born 1958), volleyball player, team silver medallist at the 1980 Summer Olympics
- Torsten Schmitz (born 1964), boxing coach and former amateur boxer
- Armin Kremer (born 1968), rally driver
- Matthias Breitkreutz (born 1971), soccer player, played 266 games
- Kevin Wölbert (born 1989), speedway driver

== Villages within the municipality ==
- Augustenhof
- Badegow
- Basthorst
- Gädebehn
- Kladow
- Muchelwitz
- Radepohl
- Wessin
