= Thomas Jung =

Thomas Jung may refer to:

- Thomas Jung (politician) (1957–2022), German politician (AfD)
- Thomas Jung (rower) (born 1969), German rower
- Thomas Jung (conductor) (born 1984), German conductor
