= Pietari Inkinen =

Finnish violinist and conductor (born 1980)

Pietari Inkinen (born 29 April 1980) is a Finnish violinist and conductor.

== Biography ==
Inkinen was born in Kouvola, Finland, and began violin and piano studies at the age of 4. As a youth, he also performed in a rock band. He attended the Sibelius Academy and graduated with diplomas in violin (2003) and conducting (2005). He studied violin at the Hochschule für Musik Köln with Zakhar Bron. Inkinen has performed on a Carlo Bergonzi 1732 violin. He leads a chamber trio, the Inkinen Trio.

In May 2007, Inkinen was named the second music director of the New Zealand Symphony Orchestra. He formally assumed the post in January 2008. In October 2013, the NZSO announced the extension of Inkinen's contract through the 2015 season. Inkinen concluded his NZSO tenure at the end of 2015, and now has the title of Honorary Conductor of the NZSO. He and the NZSO have recorded music of Einojuhani Rautavaara and of Jean Sibelius for the Naxos label, and of Richard Wagner for EMI Classics. In Australia, his work in opera has included his conducting of Opera Australia's Melbourne Ring Cycle in 2013, following the resignation of Richard Mills.

In September 2009, Inkinen became principal guest conductor of the Japan Philharmonic Orchestra (JPO). In April 2015, the JPO appointed Inkinen as its next chief conductor, effective September 2016, with an initial contract of 3 seasons. The most recent extension of his JPO contract, announced in May 2021, is through August 2023. He stood down as chief conductor of the JPO in August 2023.

In Europe, Inkinen was named the new chief conductor of the Ludwigsburg Schlossfestspiele in March 2014, for the period from 2015 through 2017. In October 2014, the Prague Symphony Orchestra announced the appointment of Inkinen as its next chief conductor, as of September 2015. He had first conducted the Prague Symphony Orchestra in 2007. His first guest-conducting appearance with the Deutsche Radio Philharmonie Saarbrücken Kaiserslautern was in 2010. In September 2016, the orchestra named Inkinen its next chief conductor, effective with the 2017–2018 season, with an initial contract of 4 years. Inkinen concluded his tenure with the Deutsche Radio Philharmonie Saarbrücken Kaiserslautern at the close of the 2024–2025 season.

In May 2021, the KBS Symphony Orchestra announced the appointment of Inkinen as its next chief conductor and music director, effective January 2022, with an initial contract through the end of 2024. Inkinen concluded his tenure with the KBS Symphony Orchestra in December 2024.

Cultural offices
Preceded by James Judd	Music Director, New Zealand Symphony Orchestra; 2008–2015	Succeeded by Edo de Waart
Preceded by Muhai Tang	Chief Conductor, Prague Symphony Orchestra; 2015–2020	Succeeded by Tomáš Brauner
Preceded by Alexander Lazarev	Chief Conductor, Japan Philharmonic Orchestra; 2016–2023	Succeeded by Wong Kah Chun
Preceded by Karel Mark Chichon	Chief Conductor, Deutsche Radio Philharmonie Saarbrücken Kaiserslautern; 2017–2025	Succeeded by Josep Pons
Preceded by Yoel Levi	Chief Conductor and Music Director, KBS Symphony Orchestra; 2022–2024	Succeeded by Myung-whun Chung
