= Radu Rățoi =

- Born: September 20, 1998 (age 27); Chișinău, Moldova
- Origin: Chișinău, Moldova
- Genres: Classical music
- Occupation: Musician
- Instrument: Accordion
- Website: raduratoi.com

Radu Rățoi (born 20 September 1998) is a Moldovan accordionist who performs classical works, original accordion repertoire, and his own transcriptions of works for other instruments.

== Early life and education ==
Rățoi was born on 20 September 1998 in Chișinău, Moldova. He began playing accordion at age six and won his first competition at age nine. He studied at the Alexei Stârcea School of Arts in Chișinău and the Ștefan Neaga Centre of Excellence in Artistic Education. He completed a bachelor's degree at the Royal Danish Academy of Music in Copenhagen in 2021, and began a master's programme there in 2022, studying with Geir Draugsvoll.

== Career ==
In 2016, Rățoi won the Junior Coupe Mondiale in Rostov-on-Don, Russia. In 2018, he won both the Senior Coupe Mondiale and the Senior Virtuoso Entertainment competition at Kaunas, Lithuania, becoming the first Moldovan to win the Coupe Mondiale. Between 2018 and 2020, he won first prizes at the Klingenthal Accordion Competition (2019), the Arrasate Hiria International Accordion Competition (2019), PIF Castelfidardo, and the International Accordion Competition Moscow (2020). In total, he has received over 60 awards.

In 2024, Rățoi won the Young Concert Artists Susan Wadsworth International Auditions in New York, becoming the second accordion artist to be featured on the YCA roster. That year, he was also appointed soloist with the National Chamber Orchestra of Moldova. In 2025, he signed with CAMI Music.

Rățoi has performed at venues including the Berlin Philharmonic, Tivoli Concert Hall, Merkin Hall, the Kennedy Center, Carnegie Hall, the Romanian Athenaeum, Harbin Concert Hall and the Aram Khachaturian Concert Hall in Yerevan. He has appeared as soloist with orchestras including the Kaunas City Symphony Orchestra under Constantine Orbelian, the SWR Symphonieorchester under Gemma New, the RDAM Symphony Orchestra under Thomas Søndergård, the Westmoreland Symphony Orchestra, the Potsdam Chamber Orchestra, and the Shenzhen Symphony Orchestra.

His repertoire ranges from baroque to contemporary music, including works by J. S. Bach, Domenico Scarlatti, Jean-Philippe Rameau, Franz Liszt, and Per Nørgård, as well as original works written for accordion. He has transcribed Liszt's Transcendental Études for accordion. His debut album, Greatest Organ Works Arranged for Accordion, featuring works by Bach and Liszt, was released in 2022. He performs on a Pigini Nova accordion and teaches accordion in Brașov, Romania.

== Awards and honours ==
- 2016: First prize, Junior Coupe Mondiale, Rostov-on-Don
- 2018: Excellence Diploma, awarded by the President of Moldova
- 2018: First prize, Senior Coupe Mondiale and Senior Virtuoso Entertainment, Kaunas
- 2019: First prize, Klingenthal Accordion Competition
- 2020: First prize, International Accordion Competition Moscow
- 2022: Master in Arts, awarded by the President of Moldova
- 2023: Léonie Sonning Talent Prize, Denmark
- 2024: Young Concert Artists Susan Wadsworth International Auditions, New York
- 2025: National Prize of the Republic of Moldova
