= 2016 Gustav Mahler Conducting Competition =

The 2016 Gustav Mahler Conducting Competition was the fifth edition of the competition, and it was held in Bamberg from May 6 to 13, 2016 with the Bamberg Symphony. It was won by Singaporean conductor Wong Kah Chun.

== Jury ==
- Jonathan Nott (president)
- Marcus Rudolf Axt
- Jiří Bělohlávek
- Deborah Borda
- Martin Campbell-White
- John Carewe
- Ara Guzelimian
- Barbara Hannigan
- Boris-Alexander Jusa
- Neville Marriner
- Jörg Widmann
- Marina Mahler

== Results ==
N	Competitor	P	M	S	F
(Venezuela)	Barráez, Rodolfo		o/c	o/c	o/c
(Romania)	Bebeselea, Gabriel				o/c
(Chile)	Bortolameolli, Paolo				o/c
(China)	Chen, Tong		o/c	o/c	o/c
(Poland)	Duczmal-Mróz, Anna		o/c	o/c	o/c
(Japan)	Harada, Keitaro			o/c	o/c
(Germany)	Köhler, Georg		o/c	o/c	o/c
(Russia)	Neller, Sergey				2nd
(New Zealand)	New, Gemma			o/c	o/c
(South Korea)	Seo, Eunseok		o/c	o/c	o/c
(Russia)	Uryupin, Valentin				3rd
(Romania)	Vizireanu, Vlad		o/c	o/c	o/c
(Singapore)	Wong, Kah Chun				1st
(United States)	Yi, David		o/c	o/c	o/c

== Programme ==
Composer	Work	Date
Dutilleux, Henri	Correspondances	2003
Haydn, Joseph	Mourning Symphony	1772
Mahler, Gustav	Symphony No. 3	1896
Webern, Anton	Six Pieces for Orchestra	1910
Widmann, Jörg	Bavarian-Babylonian March	2014
