= Wessin =

- Ortsteil of Crivitz
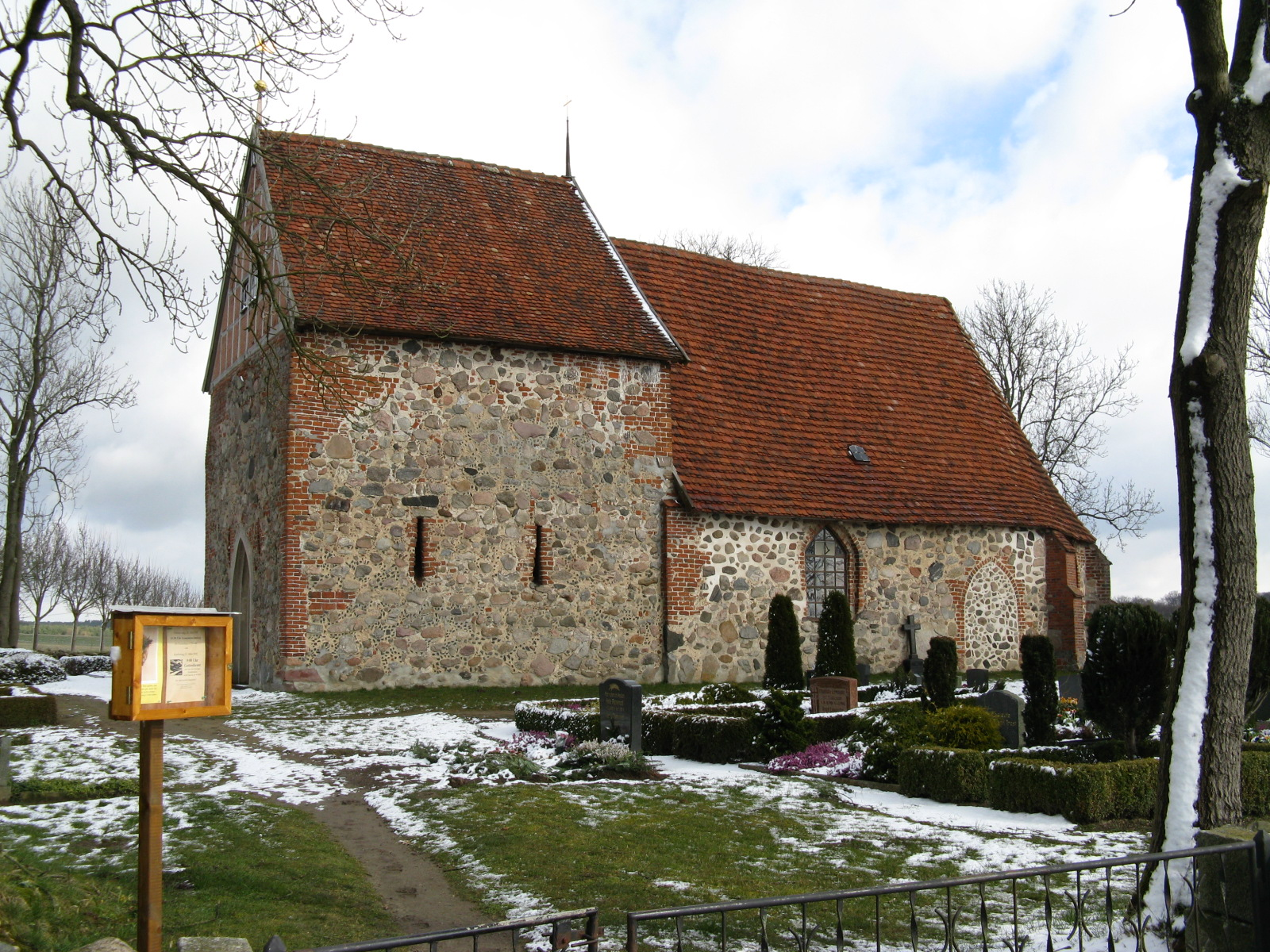
- Church
- Interactive map of Wessin
- Location within Germany Location within Mecklenburg-Vorpommern
- Coordinates: 53°34′N 11°44′E
- Country: Germany
- State: Mecklenburg-Vorpommern
- District: Ludwigslust-Parchim
- Town: Crivitz
- Subdivisions: 3

Area
  - Total: 17.07 km^{2} (6.59 sq mi)
- Elevation: 58 m (190 ft)

Population (2009-12-31)
  - Total: 438
  - Density: 25.7/km^{2} (66.5/sq mi)
- Time zone: UTC+01:00 (CET)
  - Summer (DST): UTC+02:00 (CEST)
- Postal codes: 19089
- Dialling codes: 03863
- Vehicle registration: PCH
- Website: http://www.amt-crivitz.de/

Wessin is a village and a former municipality in the Ludwigslust-Parchim district, in Mecklenburg-Vorpommern, Germany. The village is rural and the main land use within the boundary is farming.

== History ==
On the northern edge of the village is the stone church, which dates from the 12th century AD.

The grounds of the Kurzzeitpflege am Tulpenbaum former manor house contain one of Germany's largest and oldest specimens of Liriodendron tulipifera, at approx 32 metres (105 ft) in height.

The former municipality included the villages of Badegow and Radepohl. Since 1 January 2011, all three villages are administratively part of the town Crivitz.
