= Japan Philharmonic Orchestra =

Japanese symphony orchestra

- Orchestra
- Native name: 日本フィルハーモニー交響楽団
- Founded: 1956
- Location: Suginami-ku, Tokyo, Japan
- Concert hall: Various (See music venues)

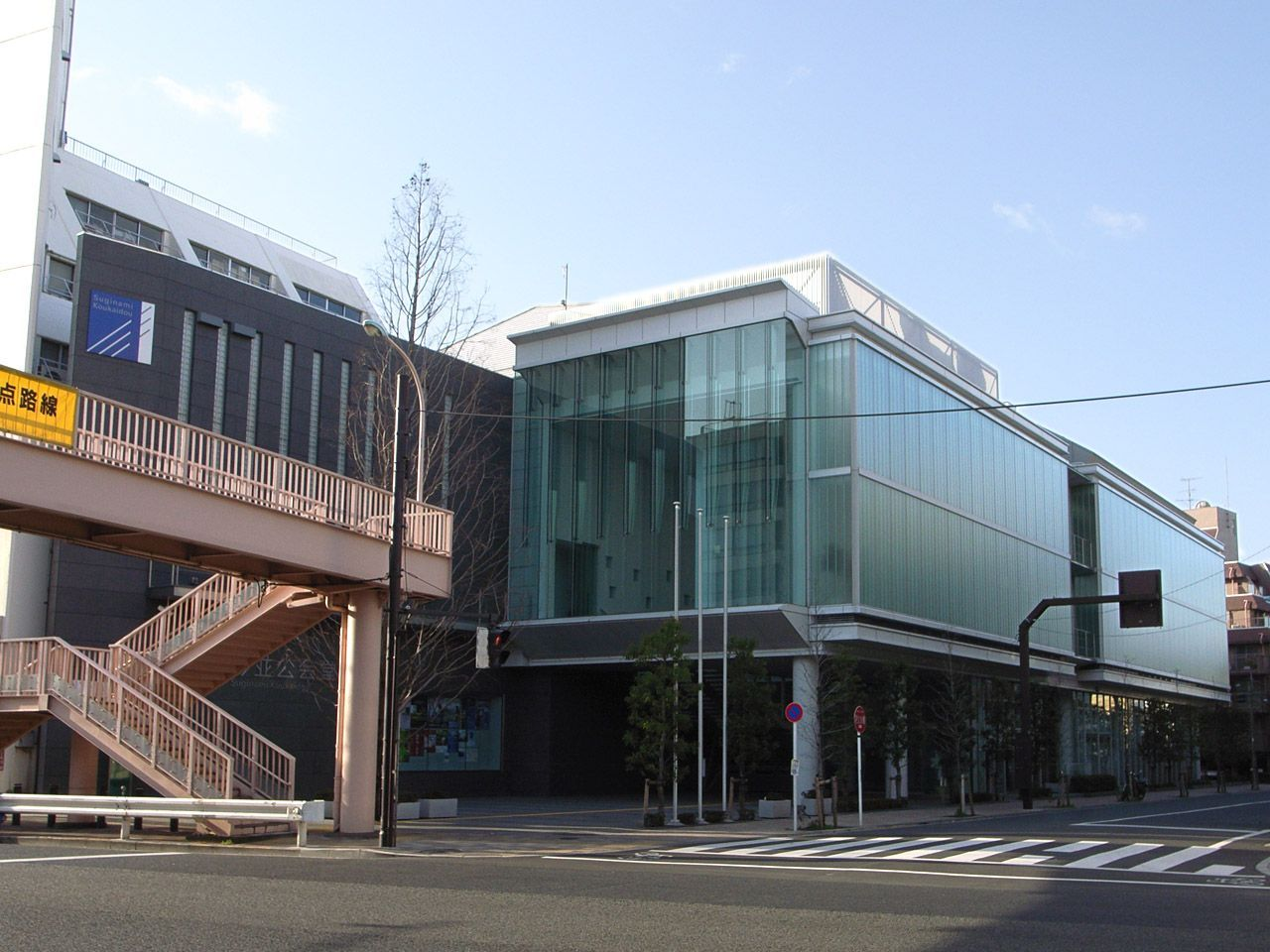
Suginami Public Hall, Suginami-ku, Tokyo, Japan (2008)

The Japan Philharmonic Orchestra (日本フィルハーモニー交響楽団, Nihon Firuhāmonī Kōkyō Gakudan) (JPO) is a Japanese symphony orchestra based in Tokyo, with administrative offices in Suginami.

== History ==
The orchestra was established on June 22, 1956, as the exclusive subsidiary orchestra under the Nippon Cultural Broadcasting. Akeo Watanabe served the first chief conductor of the orchestra, from 1950 to 1968, with the titles of music director, permanent conductor, and executive director. Watanabe recorded the symphonies of Jean Sibelius with the orchestra twice, first in the 1960s for Nippon Columbia Company, and second for Denon, in 1981. In 1958, the orchestra gave the first Japanese performance of Debussy's Pelleas and Melisande, conducted by Jean Fournet.

In 1959, the orchestra made a subsidiary contract with Fuji Television. Between 1961 and 1989, the orchestra performed regular concerts in the Tokyo Bunka Kaikan hall. Its first overseas tour took place in 1964 in Canada and America.

In March 1972, the contracts with Nippon Cultural Broadcasting and Fuji Television subsidiary ended, and the orchestra foundation was dissolved. Seiji Ozawa was the principal conductor and the music adviser at the time. One-third of those original members left to form the New Japan Philharmonic in 1972, led by Ozawa, with Naozumi Yamamoto as conductor and secretary-general. The Japan Philharmonic Orchestra Association was subsequently founded in 1973, newly formed as a self-organized orchestra. Václav Smetáček was appointed as a guest conductor. The Japan Philharmonic Orchestra Association chorus was formed end of the year. The Japan Philharmonic Orchestra Association once again became a foundation in 1985.

The orchestra formed a regular relationship with Suginami City in July 1994. The orchestra also established a residency in Yokohama at the Yokohama Minato Mirai Hall in 1998. The Suginami Public Hall was re-opened, after remodeling, in June 2006, which the orchestra uses for rehearsals and other events. The orchestra reorganised its financial basis in 2013, transitioning to a publicly held foundation basis.

Alexander Lazarev was principal conductor of the orchestra from 2008 to 2016, and now has the title of conductor laureate with the orchestra. Pietari Inkinen was principal guest conductor from 2009 to 2016. In April 2015, the orchestra announced the appointment of Inkinen as its new chief conductor, effective in 2016, with an initial contract of 3 years. Other conductors with whom the orchestra has a regular working relationship include Neeme Järvi, who has served as principal guest conductor of the orchestra, and James Loughran, who was appointed as honorary conductor in November 2006.

In 2016, Pietari Inkinen was appointed chief conductor. The most recent extension of Inkinen's JPO contract, announced in May 2021, is through August 2023. Inkinen stood down as chief conductor of the JPO in August 2023.

In March 2021, Kahchun Wong first guest-conducted the JPO. In August 2021, the JPO appointed Wong as its principal guest conductor, effective September 2021, with an initial contract of 2 years. In May 2022, the JPO announced the appointment of Wong as its next chief conductor, effective with the 2023-2024 season, with an initial contract of 5 years.

== Chief Conductors ==
- Akeo Watanabe (1950–1968)
- Ken-Ichiro Kobayashi (1988–2007)
- Alexander Lazarev (2008–2016)
- Pietari Inkinen (2016–2023)
- Kahchun Wong (2023–present)

== Music venues ==
=== Tokyo venues ===
- Suntory Hall
- Tokyo Metropolitan Theatre
- Suginami Public Hall
- Nakano Zero Hall (occasional use)

=== Yokohama venue ===
- Yokohama Minato Mirai Hall

=== Saitama venue ===
- Omiya Sonic City
