= Kurt Graunke =

German composer and conductor

Kurt Graunke (September 20, 1915 in Stettin, Germany – June 5, 2005 in Munich) was a German composer and a conductor. He was the founder of an eponymous orchestra that became the Munich Symphony Orchestra.

Music critic Dave Hurwitz labelled Graunke "the worst symphonist ever", though he acknowledged that he was exaggerating.

== Life ==
He studied violin, becoming the second concertmaster at the age of 17 of the local orchestra. In 1934 he began studying violin with Gustav Havemann, composition with Adolf Lessle and Hermann Grabner at the Berlin Hochschule für Musik, but had to withdraw in 1935 for financial reasons. During World War II he studied conducting with Wolfgang Schneiderhan in Vienna. After the war, he moved to Munich where he started the Symphony Orchestra Graunke, conducting it until 1989. It served as a recording orchestra for more than 500 films and television shows. The orchestra became the Munich Symphony Orchestra in 1990. He composed 9 symphonies, a Violin Concerto, a String Quartet, and many short works for orchestra. He reworked the String Quartet of 1974 into a Symphony for Strings, which he then fully orchestrated in 1976, becoming his third symphony. These have all been issued on compact disks by Sedina.

== Works ==
- Symphony No. 1 in E major, The Homeland (1969)
- Symphony No. 2 (1972)
- Symphony No. 3 (1976) (based on the String Quartet)
- Symphony No. 4 (1977)
- Symphony No. 5 (1981)
- Symphony No. 6 (1981)
- Symphony No. 7 (1983)
- Symphony No. 8 (1985)
- Symphony No. 9 (1996)
- Violin Concerto (1959)
- String Quartet (1974)
- Piano Concerto (1988)
