= Lahav Shani =

Israeli conductor and pianist (born 1989)

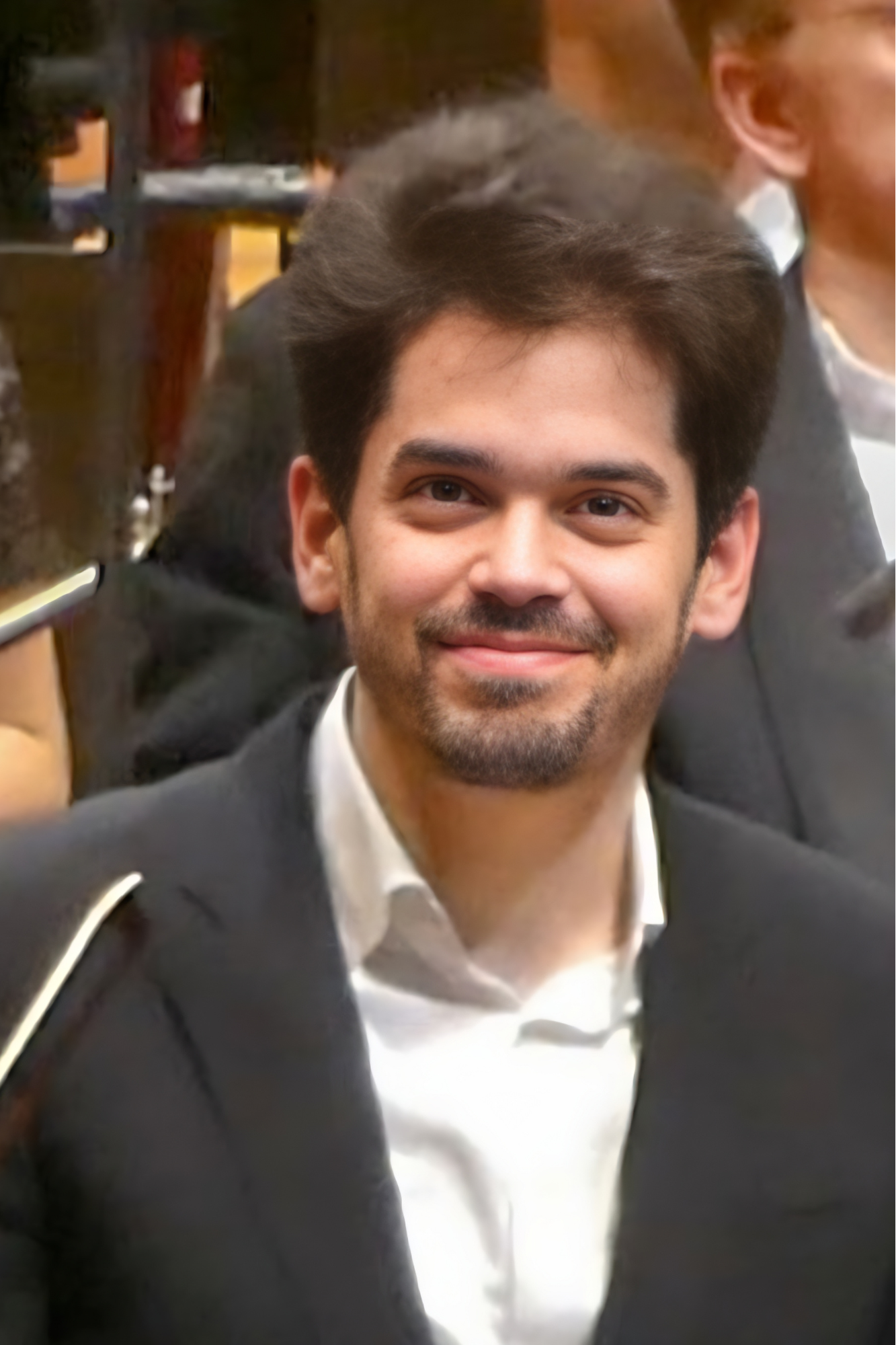
Lahav Shani, 2024

Lahav Shani (Hebrew: להב שני; born 7 January 1989) is an Israeli conductor, pianist and double bassist. He is currently music director of the Israel Philharmonic Orchestra and chief conductor of the Munich Philharmonic.

== Biography ==
Shani was born in Tel Aviv, the son of Michael Shani, a choral conductor. He began piano lessons at age six with Hannah Shalgi. He continued his piano studies from Arie Vardi at the Buchmann-Mehta School of Music in Tel Aviv. He subsequently studied double bass with Teddy Kling, the former principal bassist of the Israel Philharmonic Orchestra. Shani continued further music studies at the Hochschule für Musik "Hanns Eisler" Berlin, where his teachers included Christian Ehwald (orchestral conducting) and Fabio Bidini (piano). Daniel Barenboim has served as a conducting mentor for Shani.

== Music career ==
Shani first appeared as a guest pianist with the Israel Philharmonic Orchestra in 2007. In 2010, Zubin Mehta engaged Shani as pianist and assistant conductor for a tour with the Israel Philharmonic. With the Israel Philharmonic, Shani conducted the Israel Philharmonic's opening season concerts in 2013. He has returned each year subsequently as a guest conductor with the orchestra.

Shani won first prize at the 2013 International Gustav Mahler Conducting Competition. In May 2015, he first guest-conducted the Vienna Symphony. In November 2015, he made his debut with the Vienna Philharmonic, as both conductor and pianist, as an emergency substitute for Franz Welser-Möst. In January 2016, the Vienna Symphony announced the appointment of Shani as its next principal guest conductor, as of the 2017–2018 season.

In June 2016, Shani made his debut with the Rotterdam Philharmonic Orchestra (RPhO), as both guest conductor and piano soloist. On the basis of this single appearance, the RPhO musicians unanimously elected Shani as the next chief conductor of the orchestra, in August 2016, the youngest conductor to be named chief conductor of the RPhO to date. His RPhO contract is effective from the 2018–2019 season, for 12 weeks per season. The appointment marks Shani's first appointment to a full-time orchestral post. In March 2020, the RPhO announced the extension of Shani's contract as chief conductor through August 2026. Shani concluded his tenure as its chief conductor at the close of the 2025–2026 season and now has the title of Eredirigent with the orchestra.

In January 2018, the Israel Philharmonic announced the appointment of Shani as its next music director, effective with the 2020–2021 season. He held the title of music director designate of the orchestra in the 2019–2020 season. In January 2025, the Israel Philharmonic announced the extension of Shani's contract as music director to 2032.

Shani first guest-conducted the Munich Philharmonic in March 2022, in a benefit concert for Ukraine. He returned in September 2022 for an additional guest-conducting appearance with the orchestra. On 28 January 2023, a news report in NRC Handelsblad indicated the appointment of Shani as the next chief conductor of the orchestra as of the start of the 2026–2027 season, which the orchestra and the Munich City Council officially confirmed on 1 February 2023. Shani's initial Munich Philharmonic contract is for 5 years.

In September 2025, Shani was scheduled to conduct the Munich Philharmonic at the Festival of Flanders in Ghent. The organisers cancelled his appearance. The festival stated that the decision aligned with calls from within the local cultural sector "to refrain from collaboration with partners who have not distanced themselves unequivocally from the genocidal Israeli government". This decision received condemnation from German and Belgian officials, with Belgian Prime Minister Bart De Wever describing it as "reckless and irresponsible".

Shani resides in Berlin and continues to give recitals as a solo pianist.

Cultural offices
Preceded by Yannick Nézet-Séguin	Principal Conductor, Rotterdam Philharmonic Orchestra; 2018–2026	Succeeded by (post vacant)
Preceded by Zubin Mehta	Music Director, Israel Philharmonic Orchestra; 2020–present	Succeeded by incumbent
Preceded by Valery Gergiev	Chief Conductor, Munich Philharmonic; 2022–present	Succeeded by incumbent
