= Shenzhen Symphony Orchestra =

Established 1982

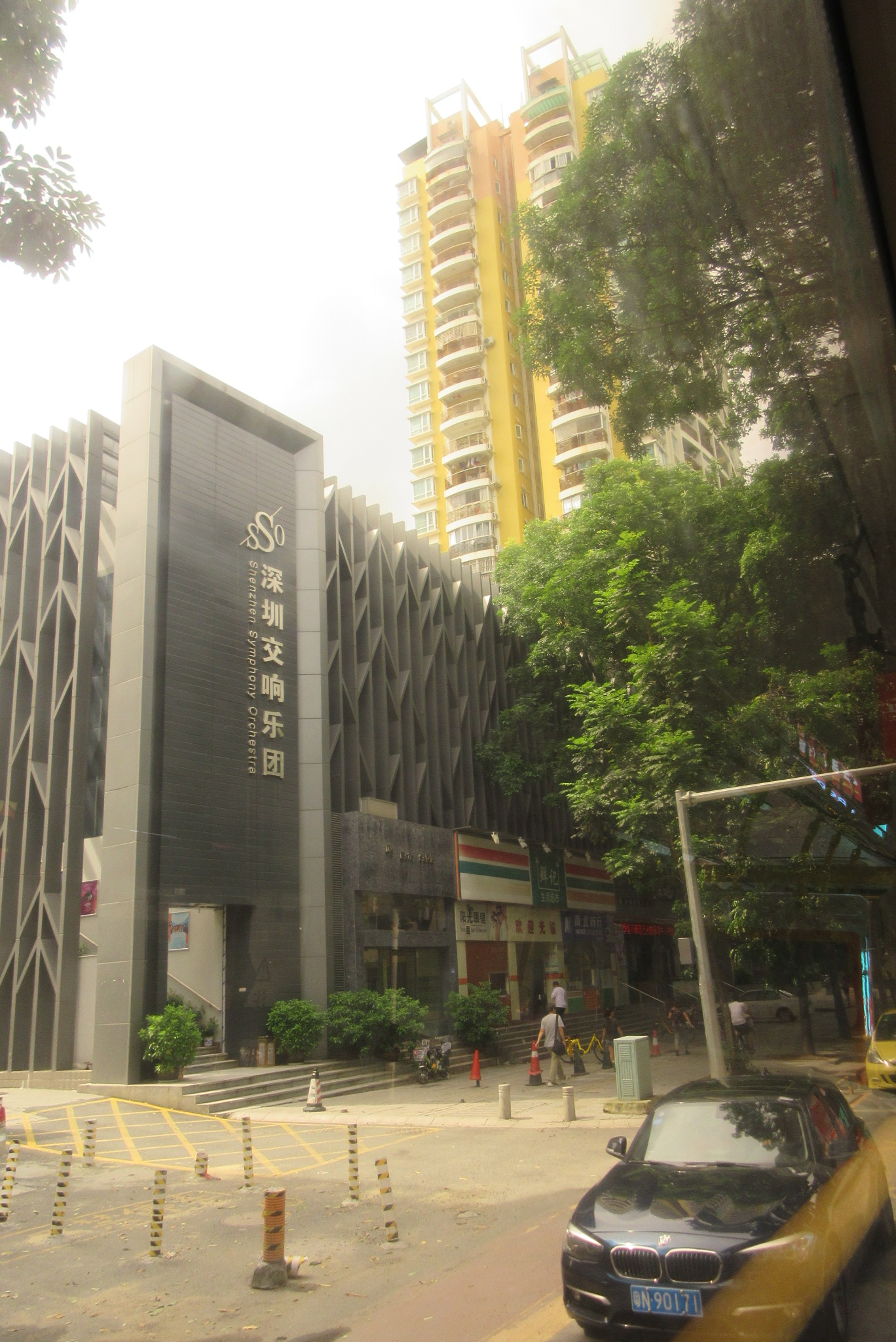
Exterior view of the building

Shenzhen Symphony Orchestra (Chinese: 深圳交响乐团) is a symphony orchestra based in and supported by the municipality of Shenzhen, China. It was established in 1982 and is led by General Manager Chen Chuansong.

Since 1987, Shenzhen Symphony Orchestra has annually toured China, having visited Taiwan, Hong Kong and Macau several times. It has also visited Berlin and Prague.

The orchestra has welcomed guest conductors from China and abroad throughout its history, including Li Delun, Han Zhongjie, Zheng Xiaoying, Bian Zushan, Huang Xiaotong, Chen Xieyang, Zhang Guoyong, Chen Zuohuang and Shao En. Yao Guanrong served as the principal conductor of the orchestra from 1985 to 1997. The position of artistic director was held by Zhang Guoyong from 1998 to 2000 and by Yu Feng from 2001 to 2007 and has been held by German conductor Christian Ehwald since 2008. Many world-known figures have been guest conductors of the Orchestra including the music director of Komische Oper Berlin Rolf Reuter, principal conductor of Berlin Symphony Orchestra Michael Schønwandt, director of Munich Symphony Orchestra Heiko Mathias Förster, director of Hamburg State Opera Simone Young, dean of Sydney Conservatorium of Music Ronald Smart, chancellor of the Mozarteum University of Salzburg Reinhart Von Gutzeit, and Japanese conductor Yoshikawa Fukumura. The orchestra has performed with prominent Chinese composer Tan Dun, Chinese pianists Lang Lang, Li Yundi, and Sa Chen, Spanish tenor José Carreras, and movie music master Erich Kunzel. It has collaborated with Lang Lang since 2004.

== See also ==
- List of symphony orchestras in China
