= Ewa Strusińska =

Polish conductor

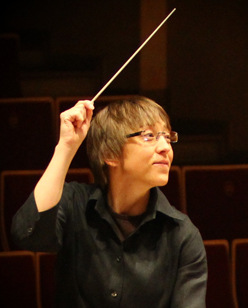

Background information
- Born: Ewa Strusińska; July 19, 1976; Stalowa Wola, Poland
- Genre: classical music
- Occupation: Conductor
- Website: ewastrusinska.com

Ewa Strusińska (born 19 July 1976 in Stalowa Wola) is a Polish British conductor, general music director (Generalmusikdirektorin / GMD) of the Gerhart-Hauptmann-Theater Görlitz-Zittau ^{(de)} and principal conductor of the Neue Lausitzer Philharmonie in Germany. Former music director and principal conductor of Szczecin Philharmonic Orchestra, first became known to the artistic world as a laureate and prize winner at the prestigious Gustav Mahler Conducting Competition in Bamberg.

== Biography ==
General Music Director (Generalmusikdirektor / GMD) of the Gerhart-Hauptmann-Theater Görlitz-Zittau, principal conductor of the Neue Lausitzer Philharmonie and former music director and principal conductor of Szczecin Philharmonic Orchestra from 2013 to 2016, Ewa Strusińska first became known to the artistic world as a laureate and prize winner at the prestigious Gustav Mahler Conducting Competition in Bamberg.

From 2008 to 2010, Ewa Strusińska held the position of assistant conductor with the Hallé Orchestra in Manchester – the first-ever female assistant conductor of a British orchestra. She worked closely with the orchestra's music director, Sir Mark Elder CBE, conducting the orchestra in many concerts across England, and simultaneously held the position of music director with the Hallé Youth Orchestra.

Ewa Strusińska has also built up an extensive operatic and ballet repertoire as an assistant conductor at the Polish National Opera and Polish National Ballet – Teatr Wielki in Warsaw. Her other opera work includes appearances at the Royal Northern College of Music, Buxton Opera Festival and Theater Magdeburg.

Born in Poland, Ewa Strusińska studied at the Fryderyk Chopin University of Music in Warsaw, and upon finishing her studies spent a year working as assistant conductor at Czestochowa Philharmonic Orchestra. In the same year she won a position of Junior Fellow in Conducting at the Royal Northern College of Music in Manchester and moved to the United Kingdom. In 2008 she was chosen by the London Symphony Orchestra to be one of three participants in a masterclass by Valery Gergiev, and in 2010 collaborated with the Royal Ballet at Covent Garden.

Internationally, she has worked with a range of orchestras including the BBC National Orchestra of Wales, Bamberger Symphoniker, Hallé Orchestra, Magdeburgische Philharmonie, Norddeutsche Philharmonie Rostock, Hofer Symphoniker, Sinfonietta Baden, Uppsala Chamber Orchestra, Warsaw Philharmonic Orchestra, National Polish Radio Orchestra, Sinfonia Varsovia, Szczecin Philharmonic Orchestra, Łódź Philharmonic Orchestra, Opole Philharmonic Orchestra, Warsaw National Opera Philharmonic Orchestra, Beethoven Academy Orchestra, Sinfonia Iuventus, Johannesburg Philharmonic Orchestra, Gävle Symfoniorkester, Norrlands Opera Symphony Orchestra, Slovak Sinfonietta, Sønderjyllands Symfoniorkester and the Northern Sinfonia.

She has been given the title 'Ambassador of Stalowa Wola' by her home town. The accolade recognises an individual's personal achievements in Poland and abroad.

== See also ==
- Music of Poland
