= Heiko Mathias Förster =

German conductor

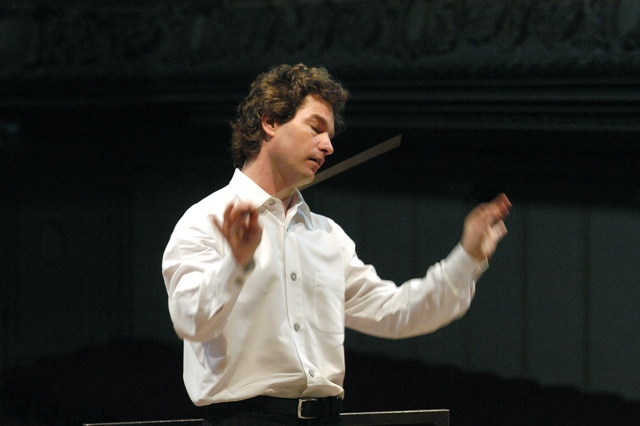
- Förster in 2007
- Born: 1966 (age 59–60); Crivitz, East Germany
- Occupation: Conductor
- Years active: 1989–present

Heiko Mathias Förster (born 1966) is a German conductor. Most notable for conducting the Munich Symphony Orchestra from 1999 to 2006, since 2014, he has been the chief conductor of the Ostrava-based Janáček Philharmonic Orchestra.

== Life and career ==
Förster was born in 1966 in Crivitz, East Germany. At the age of four, Förster had received his first piano lessons and was a student of the Schwerin Conservatory at the age of six, and in 1976, was the laureate of a national piano competition. Fascinated by the theatre atmosphere, changed his studies and devoted himself to conducting. Before completing his studies, he was first appointed as a Kapellmeister, and then, at the age of only 23, was principal conductor of the Brandenburg Theatre. In 1993, he was appointed general music director of the city of Brandenburg an der Havel. During his nine seasons, he conducted a total of 32 opera and operetta premieres at the Brandenburg Theatre in addition to about 500 concerts. Together with the Brandenburger Symphoniker, he undertook numerous national and international concert tours, which took him on tour to Japan, South Africa and the United States.

In 1999, Förster became head conductor of the Munich Symphony Orchestra until the end of the 2005/2006 season. In addition to his work as chief conductor of the orchestra, he also established himself as an opera conductor with him conducting at the International Music Festival in the Chiemgau. He ended his seven-year work in Munich with a highly praised performance of a series of all Beethoven symphonies at the Prinzregententheater.

His knowledge on the works of Richard Wagner, in particular Der Ring des Nibelungen, helped produce the Vicco von Bülow film The Ring on a Single Night (German: Der Ring an einem Abend) and the production of an orchestral version of The Ring Without Words (German: Der Ring ohne Worte) in 2003.

Other engagements, some of them international, led to him performing with such names as José Cura, Angela Gheorghiu and Rolando Villazón. During the 2004/2005 season, Förster accompanied the tenor Joseph Calleja in his Munich debut. In the spring of 2007, he conducted the Munich Symphony Orchestra during the first German tour of mezzo-soprano Elīna Garanča.

Förster took over the musical direction of the Neue Philharmonie Westfalen as the music director from 2007 to 2014 and also conducted concerts by the orchestra in Zürich, Basel, Munich and Cologne. He also received praise for his conducting of La Bohème at the Musiktheater im Revier. Some other successful performances include that of Otello, Samson and Delilah, Die tote Stadt and the German premiere of Merlin.

Förster has recently been and is primarily active in the Czech Republic, with him collaborating with the Prague Symphony Orchestra since 2009 and conducting the Czech National Symphony Orchestra. With the Prague State Opera, he created productions of Otello in 2009, Don Quichotte in 2010 and Die drei Pintos in 2011.

Förster has been a guest conductor all over the world, including for the Orquestra Sinfonica de Chile, the Moscow Philharmonic Orchestra, the Stuttgart Philharmonic, the Staatskapelle Halle, the Berliner Symphoniker, the Concerts Colonne, the orchestra of the Liceu in Barcelona, the orchestra of the National Theatre Mannheim, the Shenzhen Symphony Orchestra, the NDR Radiophilharmonie in Hanover, the Bavarian State Orchestra, Tonkünstler Orchestra, Prague Radio Symphony Orchestra, Slovak Philharmonic, Israel Philharmonic Orchestra, KBS Symphony Orchestra, the Macao Orchestra, National Taiwan Symphony Orchestra and the Berlin Radio Symphony Orchestra. He and the Janáček Philharmonic Orchestra have also created CDs for Universal Music, Sony Music, Brilliant Classics, among others.

He is married to soprano singer Heike Maria Förster and has two children.
