= Akeo Watanabe =

Japanese conductor (1919–1990)

Watanabe Akeo
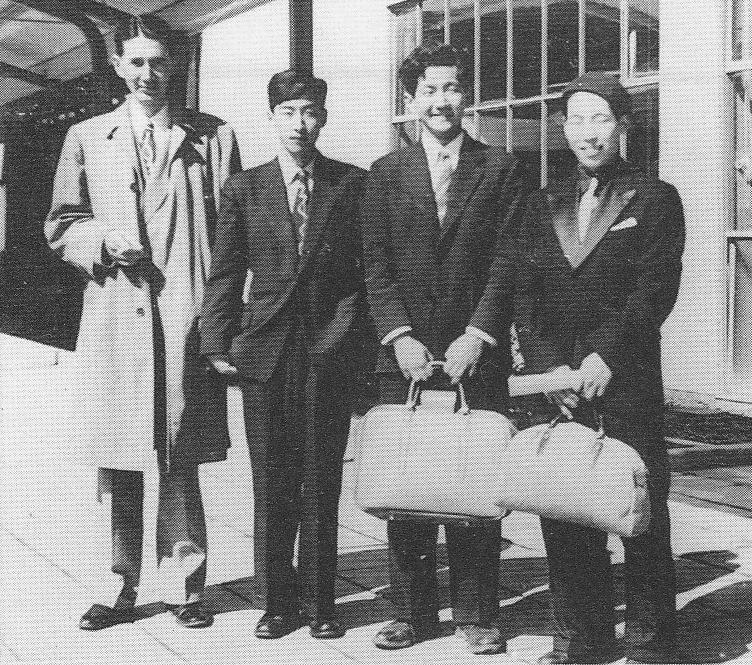
- Watanabe (far left) with Hiroyuki Iwaki (center right) and Naozumi Yamamoto (far right)
- Born: June 5, 1919; Tokyo
- Died: June 22, 1990 (aged 71); Tokyo
- Resting place: Tokyo
- Occupation: conductor

Akeo Watanabe (渡邉 暁雄, Watanabe Akeo; 1919–1990) was a Japanese symphonic conductor, known for his recordings of the works of Jean Sibelius.

Watanabe was born in 1919 to a Japanese father and Finnish mother. He studied violin and conducted at the Tokyo Music School and the Juilliard School of Music in New York City, USA. His conducting premiere was with the Tokyo Symphony Orchestra in 1945. He was music director of the Tokyo Philharmonic Orchestra from 1948 to 1954 (Kennedy 2006).

In 1956, Watanabe founded the Japan Philharmonic Orchestra and continued as its resident conductor until 1968. In 1970, he became music director of the Kyoto Symphony Orchestra, and remained so until 1972. From 1972 to 1978, he was the music director of the Tokyo Metropolitan Symphony Orchestra. In 1978, he once again became resident conductor of the newly reformed Japan Philharmonic Orchestra, with whom he stayed until 1983. In 1988, he became the music director of the Hiroshima Symphony Orchestra, and remained there until 1990. He was also a professor of conducting at the Tokyo University of the Arts from 1962 to 1967 (Kennedy 2006).

Watanabe was a regular guest conductor with orchestras in the United States and Europe (Kennedy 2006). Watanabe made the first complete set of recordings of Sibelius' symphonies in stereophonic sound with the Japan Philharmonic from 1960 to 1962 for the Nippon Columbia Company (these were released on Columbia's Epic label in the United States). He re-recorded the Sibelius symphony cycle in digital sound with the same orchestra in 1981 for Denon.

Watanabe died in 1990. Japan Philharmonic Orchestra records note that he remained as music director of the orchestra, which he founded, until his death.
