= Xenia Jankovic =

Serbian-Russian cellist

- Born: Ksenija Janković; 26 October 1958 (age 67); Niš, Serbia
- Origin: Serbian and Russian
- Genres: Classical
- Occupations: Pedagogue; cellist
- Instrument: Cello

Xenia Jankovic (born 26 October 1958) is a Serbian-Russian cellist.

== Biography ==
Jankovic was born in Niš Serbia into a Serbian–Russian family of musicians. The cello soon became her instrument of choice and she made her debut with the Belgrade Philharmonic Orchestra at the age of nine. A government scholarship allowed her to study at the Central Music School of the Moscow Conservatory with Stefan Kalianov and Mstislav Rostropovich. She then went on to study with Pierre Fournier and Guy Fallot in Geneva and with André Navarra in Detmold. Later on, intensive work with Sandor Végh and György Sebők led to a deepening of both her musical ideas and her artistic ideal.

== Career ==
In 1981 Xenia Jankovic gained proper international acclaim when she became first prize winner at the prestigious Gaspar Cassado[3] competition in Florence (Italy). At the same time she won the Lino Filippini prize for the best interpretation of Brahms. In addition to her recitals all over Europe, Xenia Jankovic has performed as soloist with prestigious orchestras, including Philharmonia Orchestra (London) and the Budapest Philharmonic Orchestra as well as Berlin Radio Symphony Orchestra, Copenhagen Philharmonic, Madrid Philharmonic Orchestra and Moscow Philharmonic Orchestra. As one of the most interesting cellists of our time, Xenia Jankovic's recitals have been many times described as deeply moving, unforgettable and sensitive. The Times (London) magazine described Xenia Jankovic's performance of Variations on a Rococo Theme (Tchaikovsky) as "She shoved to be one with the music".[4] Being an active musician, she has worked closely with Gidon Kremer, András Schiff and Tabea Zimmermann.

Over the last decade she has made a number of recordings including Bach ́s Cello Suites, integral works for cello and piano by Beethoven (played on the period instruments), sonatas and pieces by Brahms, Chopin, Frank, Dvorak, Tchaikovsky, Debussy and Jevtic and concertos by Haydn, Dvorak, Elgar, Prokofiev, Khachaturian and Shostakovich. An active chamber music player and regular participant at many chamber music festivals, she is a member of the Hamlet Piano Trio, which performs on both modern and period instruments and has made recordings of Mendelssohn, Beethoven and Schubert Piano Trios. Jankovic was the artistic director of the chamber music festival Musikdorf Ernen from 2006 to 2017.

In 2018 she founded the Inspirimus project as a reflection of her artistic, pedagogical and spiritual work. This project is inspired by the desire to engage more profoundly and responsibly with art and life in general. Recently, Jankovic has been arranging and playing with smaller ensembles, in particular the Ensemble Inspirimus, which she founded in 2020.

== Teaching ==
Xenia worked closely with young musicians over the past 35 years. She was a cello professor at the Zagreb Music Academy from 1985 to 1987, Belgrade Music Academy from 1987 to 1989 and Hochschule für Musik Würzburg from 1990 to 2004. She currently teaches at the Hochschule für Musik Detmold Germany. Some of her disciples were Susanne Beer, Bridget Mac Rae, Sebastian Jolles, Vanda Djanic, Ulf Shade, Dirk Wietheger and Gernot Nutzenberger.
