= Thomas Jung (conductor) =

German conductor (born 1984)

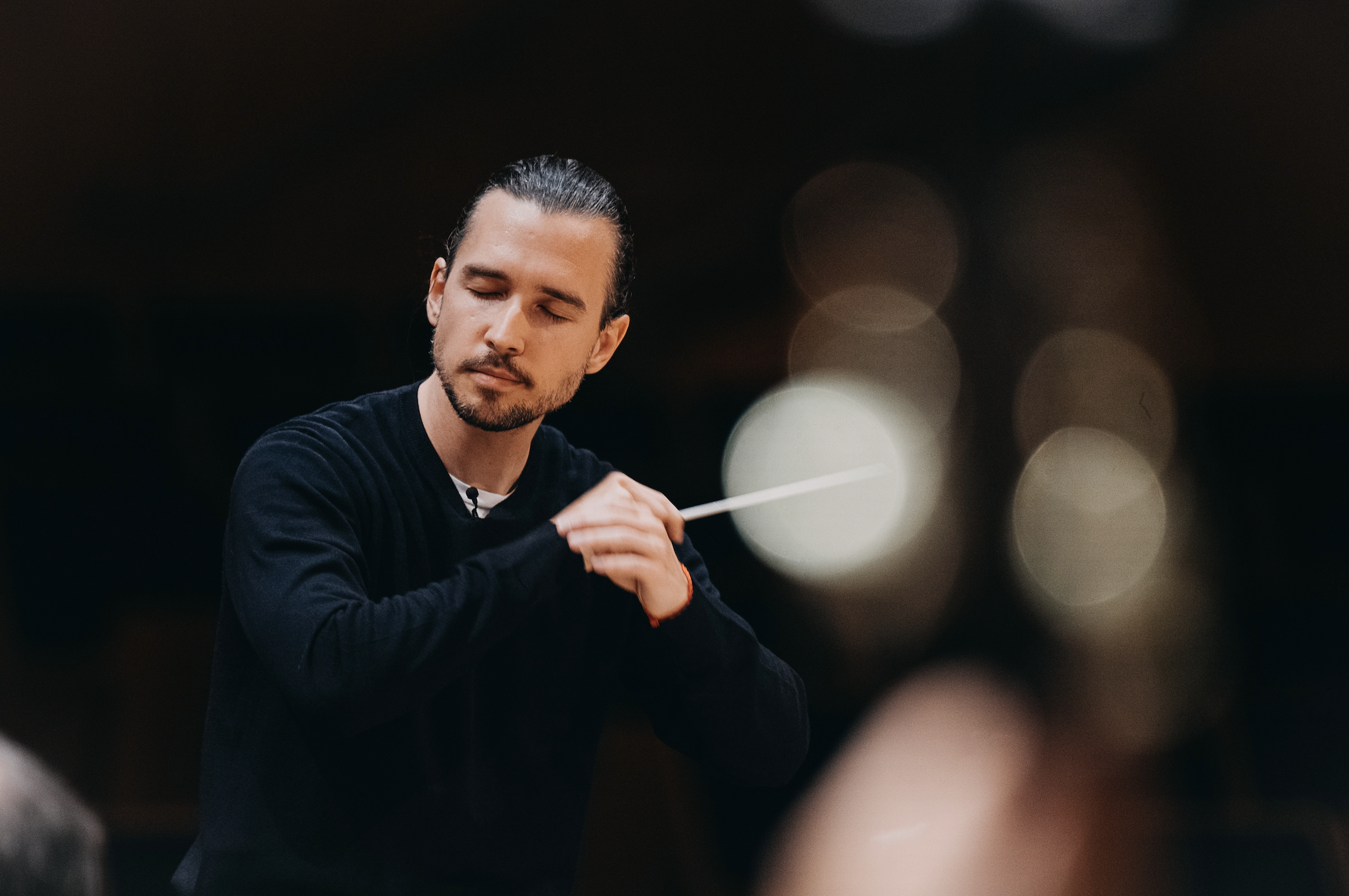
- Jung with the Bamberg Symphony Orchestra in July 2020
- Born: 1984 (age 41–42)

Thomas Jung (born 1984) is a German conductor.

== Biography ==
Thomas Jung studied at the Hochschule für Musik und Tanz Cologne and at King's College Cambridge. He was appointed as the inaugural Constant Lambert Conducting Fellow at the Royal Opera House London in 2018 and is conducting for The Royal Ballet and Birmingham Royal Ballet. In October 2020 Thomas Jung conducted the Royal Liverpool Philharmonic Orchestra for their season opening. Among others, he has been working with Bamberger Symphoniker, Dresden Philharmonic, SWR Symphony Orchestra, Het Gelders Orkest, Orkest van het Oosten, Orchestra di Padua e del Veneto and Mantua Chamber Orchestra. In 2025 he was appointed Principal Guest Conductor of Birmingham Royal Ballet and the Royal Ballet Sinfonia.

He was an Assistant and Cover Conductor for Bernard Haitink, was the Zander Fellow and Assistant Conductor of the Boston Philharmonic and Boston Philharmonic Youth Orchestra and has been working as an Assistant at the WDR Symphony Orchestra Cologne and Gürzenich Orchestra.

Jung collaborated with composer and artist Samson Young, realising his Muted Situation #22: Muted Tchaikovsky's 5th for the 2018 Sydney Biennale. The work received an award of distinction at »Prix Ars Electronica« 2019 and the »M+ Sigg Award« 2020.

Thomas Jung won the second prize at the international Gustav Mahler Conducting Competition 2020 and is a recipient of the Eugen Jochum Award. He was a fellow of the Studienstiftung des Deutschen Volkes and a conducting fellow of the Richard Wagner Association.
