= Alexander Lazarev (conductor) =

Russian conductor (born 1945)

- Александр Лазарев
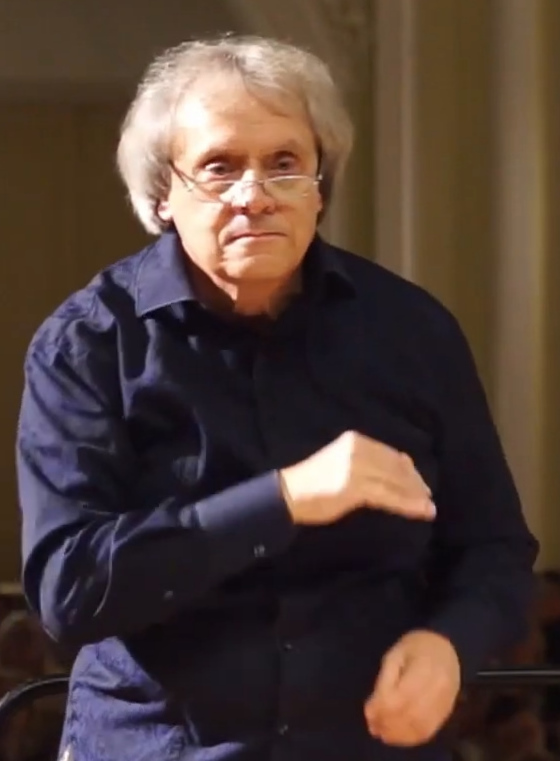
- Lazarev in 2018
- Born: July 5, 1945 (age 80); Moscow, Soviet Union
- Education: Saint Petersburg Conservatory, Moscow Conservatory
- Occupation: Conductor

Alexander Nikolayevich Lazarev (Russian: Александр Николаевич Лазарев; born July 5, 1945) is a Russian conductor. He studied at the Saint Petersburg Conservatory, and later at the Moscow Conservatory with Leo Ginzburg. In 1971, he was the first prize winner in a national conducting competition in the USSR. In 1972, he won a first prize and gold medal in the Karajan Conducting Competition in West Berlin.

From 1987–1995, Lazarev was both chief conductor and artistic director of the Bolshoi Theatre, the first person in over thirty years to hold both positions simultaneously. From 1992–1995, he was principal guest conductor of the BBC Symphony Orchestra. In 1994, Lazarev became principal guest conductor of the Royal Scottish National Orchestra (RSNO). From 1997–2005, he served as principal conductor of the RSNO, and is now its conductor emeritus.

Lazarev was the chief conductor of the Japan Philharmonic Orchestra from September 2009 until June 2016. His last program as music director consisted of Alexander Glazunov's The Seasons and Dmitri Shostakovich's Symphony No. 15. Lazarev had attended the latter's world premiere in 1972. In September 2016, the orchestra appointed Lazarev as its conductor laureate. His annual performances with the Japan Philharmonic were suspended in March 2020 as a result of the COVID-19 pandemic. He did not return to conduct until May 2021. In the wake of the escalation of hostilities in the Russo-Ukrainian War that began in February 2022, his partnership with the orchestra was interrupted again, with concerts scheduled for late 2022 cancelled as a result. Tsunoda Kōsuke was engaged as Lazarev's replacement. A scheduled concert performance of Sergei Rachmaninoff's opera Aleko conducted by Lazarev in early 2023 was also cancelled. On June 30, 2023, the chairman of the board of the Japan Philharmonic issued a statement on behalf of the orchestra that stated that although the bond between Lazarev and the orchestra was "unwavering", further performances together would not be possible until the stabilization of the political situation.

Cultural offices
Preceded by Yuri Simonov	Chief Conductor, Bolshoi Theatre, Moscow; 1987–1995	Succeeded by Peter Feranec
