= Agnieszka Duczmal =

Polish conductor (born 1946)

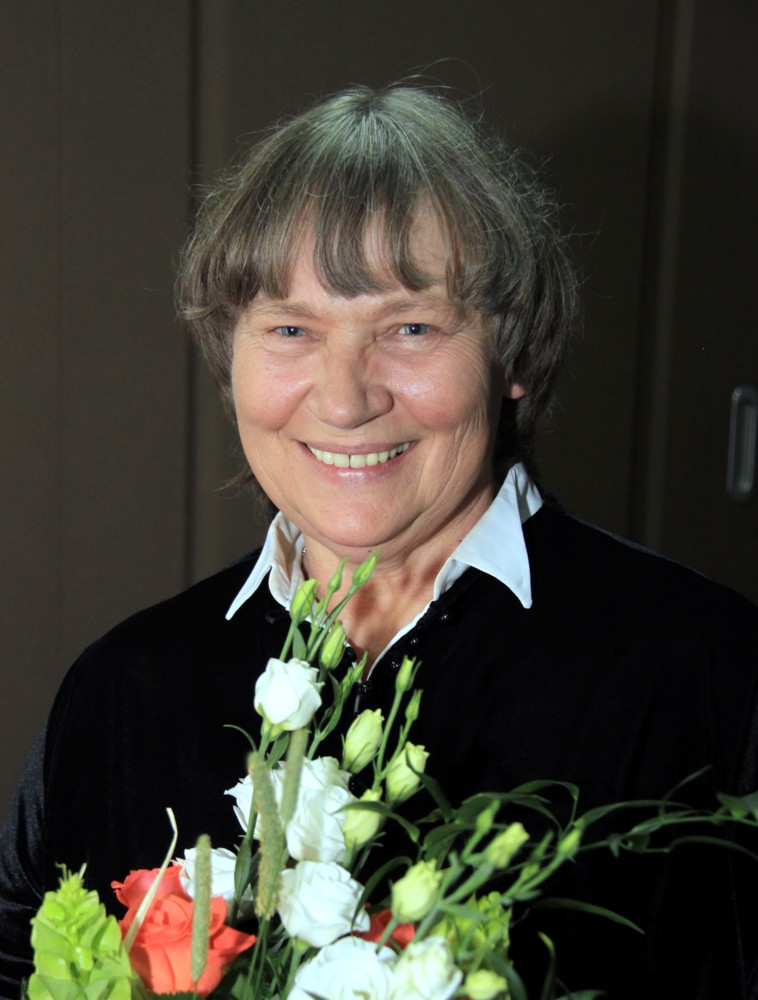

Background information
- Born: Agnieszka Duczmal; January 7, 1946; Krotoszyn, Poland
- Genre: classical music
- Occupation: Conductor

Agnieszka Duczmal (Polish pronunciation: [aɡˈɲɛʂka ˈdut͡ʂmal]; born 7 January 1946 in Krotoszyn, Poland) is a Polish conductor and founder of the Poznań Amadeus Orchestra.

== Early life and education ==
She was born in 1946 in Krotoszyn where she spent the first nine years of her life. She started to play the piano at the age of five. After having heard Richard Strauss's Till Eulenspiegel's Merry Pranks when she was in second grade of elementary school, she decided she wanted to become a conductor.

She started to study conducting at the Academy of Music in Poznań in 1966 under Witold Krzemieński and graduated in 1971. Still as a student, she founded a chamber orchestra in 1968.

== Career ==
Between 1971 and 1972 she was hired as assistant to the conductor at the Poznań Philharmonic. The chamber orchestra conducted by her was taken over by the Polish Radio in 1977, renamed the "Amadeus Chamber Orchestra" in 1988. Since 1972, she worked at the Poznań Grand Theatre where she was involved in staging the Polish premiere of Benjamin Britten's opera A Midsummer Night's Dream and Sergei Prokofiev's Romeo and Juliet.

She was the first woman conductor to perform in La Scala. She also conducted at such venues as Teatro Real in Madrid and Royal Theatre of La Monnaie in Brussels.

She appeared as a guest conductor with many philharmonic orchestras. She has been a jury member of many national and international music competitions including the Eurovision Young Musicians 2012 and the International Joseph Joachim Violin Competition.

The Amadeus Orchestra performed many tours in Poland and abroad. She has collaborated with such renowned soloists as Martha Argerich, Mischa Maisky and Henryk Szeryng. Numerous sound recordings have been made for the Polish Radio and for well-known record companies such as ASV Records, Wergo, ADDA, Canyon Classics, AMF, Europa Musica and Vienna Modern Masters.

Her programs feature Mozart's works in the foreground. In 1998, she was awarded the Commander's Cross of the Order of Polonia Restituta. In 2002, she became the recipient of Brazil's highest order of merit – the Order of the Southern Cross. In 2005, she was awarded the Silver Medal for Merit to Culture – Gloria Artis. In 2015, she was granted the title of an Honorary Citizen of the City of Poznań. In 2018, she received the Golden Fryderyk Award. In 2024, she was awarded the Coryphaeus Prize Lifetime Achievement Award at a ceremony, which took place at the National Philharmoic Hall in Warsaw. On 3 May 2026, Duczmal was awarded Poland's highest state decoration, the Order of the White Eagle.

== Personal life ==
Agnieszka Duczmal is married to the double bass player of the Amadeus Orchestra, Józef Jaroszewski. Her daughter, Anna Jaroszewska-Mróz (or Anna Duczmal-Mróz), is also a conductor.

== See also ==
- Music of Poland
