= Anna Duczmal-Mróz =

Polish conductor (born 1980)

- Born: June 24, 1980 (age 46); Poznań
- Genres: Classical
- Occupation: Conductor
- Instrument: Violin
- Years active: 2000–present
- Member of: Polish Radio Chamber Orchestra Amadeus
- Formerly of: Benjamin Britten Kammerorchester; Hanover Philharmonic; National Philharmonic Orchestra

Anna Duczmal-Mróz (born 24 June 1980 in Poznań) is a Polish conductor, the daughter of conductor Agnieszka Duczmal and double bassist Józef Jaroszewski. Since 2009, she has been the second conductor of the Polish Radio Chamber Orchestra Amadeus.

Anna Duczmal-Mróz studied violin under Krzysztof Węgrzyn at the Hochschule für Musik und Theatre in Hanover. There, her conducting talent was discovered by Japanese conductor Eiji Oue, who offered her conducting studies. She graduated with distinction in her class in 2005 and became assistant conductor of the Hanover Philharmonic.

While still a student, in 2000 in Hanover she founded her own orchestra, the Benjamin Britten Kammerorchester, with which she gave concerts throughout Germany. In 2003 she participated in the 7th International Conducting Competition named after Grzegorz Fitelberg, where, as the only woman and the youngest (23 years old) participant in the competition, she made it to the semi-finals. She returned to Poland after seven years, when as a result of the competition she received the position of assistant conductor in the National Philharmonic Orchestra conducted by Antoni Wit.

She worked with orchestras in Germany, Italy, Denmark and the Belgian orchestra I Musici Brucellensis in the hall of the Palais des Beaux-Arts in Brussels. She made her debut in Poland with the Polish Radio Chamber Orchestra Amadeus, of which she has been the second conductor since 2009.

She has performed many times, including with the National Philharmonic Orchestra and Choir, Polish National Radio Symphony Orchestra, Krakow Philharmonic, Sinfonietta Krakow, Lublin Philharmonic, Poznań Philharmonic, Bydgostiensis Chapel, Płock Symphony Orchestra and Sinfonia Varsovia.
