= Munich Symphony Orchestra =

Orchestra in Munich, Germany

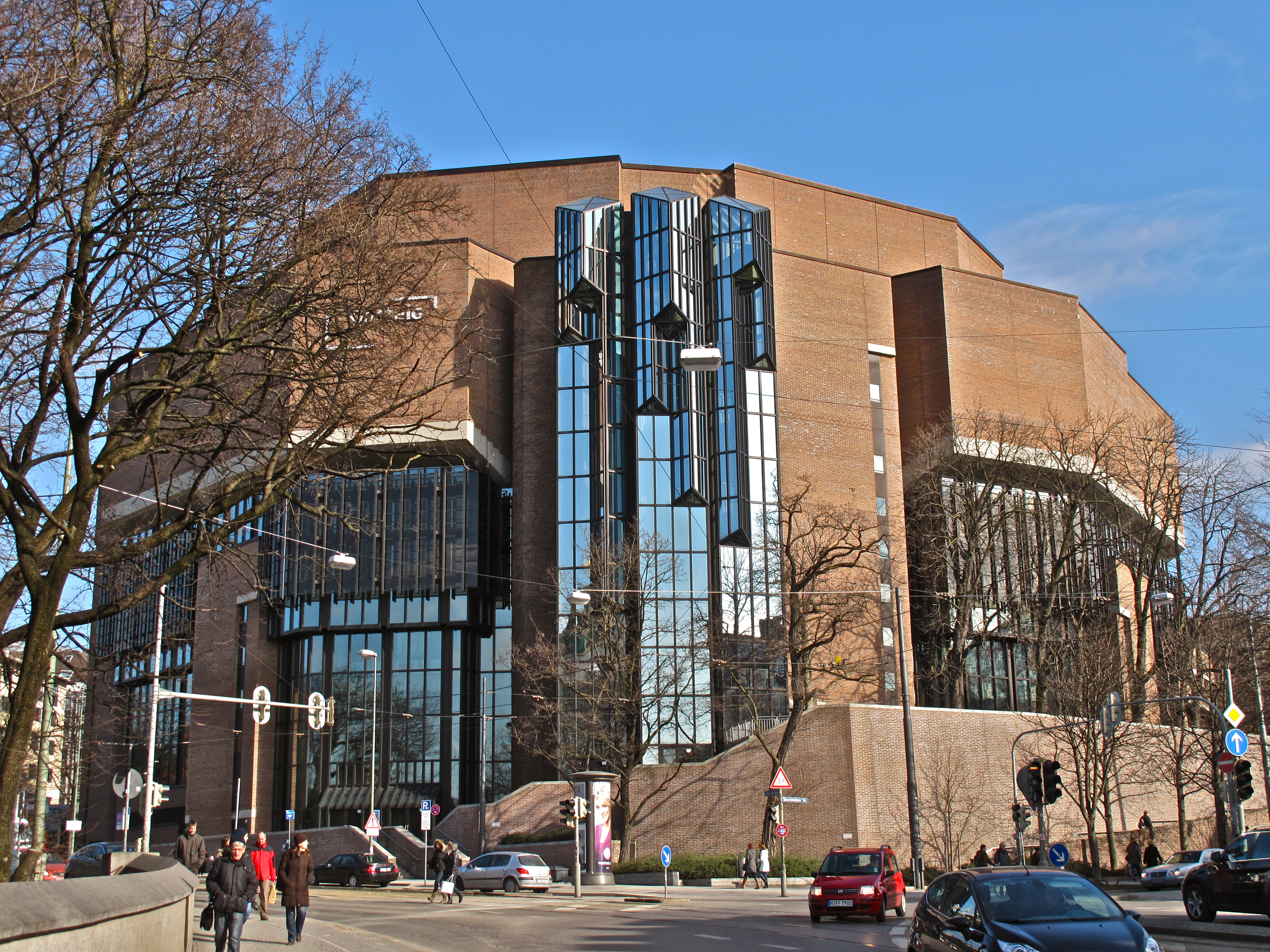
The Philharmonie of the Gasteig (cultural centre of the city of Munich)

The Munich Symphony Orchestra (Münchner Symphoniker) is a German orchestra based in Munich. The orchestra gives subscription concerts at the Herkulessaal and the Prinzregententheater and, to a lesser degree, at the Philharmonie am Gasteig, along with other activities statewide in Bavaria.

== History ==
Kurt Graunke founded the ensemble as the "Graunke Symphony Orchestra" in 1945. The orchestra included 13 musicians formerly with the Third Reich-era NS-Reichssymphonieorchester, as reported in the 2025 documentary Klang der Erinnerung – Orchesterspuren von München bis Tel Aviv. Graunke led the orchestra's first concert on 25 September 1945 as a benefit for the Bavarian Red Cross. Regular subscription concerts began four years later. Graunke held the post until 1989. In 1990, the orchestra adopted its current name.

Following Graunke, successive chief conductors of the orchestra have been Christoph Stepp (1990–1999), Heiko Mathias Förster (1999–2006), Georg Schmöhe (2006–2013), and Kevin John Edusei (2014–2022). Philippe Entremont held the title of Ehrendirigent, or honorary conductor. Past principal guest conductors have included Ken-David Masur. In December 2022, the orchestra announced the appointment of Joseph Bastian as its next chief conductor, effective with the 2023–2024 season. In September 2025, the orchestra announced the extension of Bastian's contract as chief conductor through 2031.

The Münchner Symphoniker has recorded music for more than 500 films, including George Bruns' adaptation of Tchaikovsky's ballet score for Walt Disney's Sleeping Beauty, El Cid by Miklos Rozsa, Jerry Goldsmith's score for The Wind and the Lion, Christopher Young's music for Hellbound: Hellraiser II, Victor Young's score for The Brave One and Howard Shore's score for The Silence of the Lambs. It also performed the soundtrack to 1990s episodes of the TV series The Adventures of Young Indiana Jones.

== Chief conductors ==
- Kurt Graunke (1945–1989)
- Christoph Stepp (1990–1999)
- Heiko Mathias Förster (1999–2006)
- Georg Schmöhe (2006–2013)
- Kevin John Edusei (2014–2022)
- Joseph Bastian (2023–present)
