= Wong Kah Chun =

- Born: 24 June 1986 (age 39); Singapore
- Occupation: Conductor • Composer
- Years active: 2015–present

Wong Kah Chun (Chinese: 黃佳俊; pinyin: Huáng Jiājùn; born 24 June 1986), also known as Kahchun Wong, is a Singaporean conductor.

== Biography ==
Wong was born in 1986 to Victor Wong, a Singapore Armed Forces (SAF) warrant officer, and Yeo Huay Lan, a childcare teacher. His family lived in a five-room HDB flat in the Jurong West neighborhood of Singapore.

Wong attended River Valley High School during his secondary school years and played the trumpet in the school's Concert Band. After graduation he enrolled in Raffles Institution for his pre-university education, and joined the school's symphonic band and took up music as an A-Level subject. His interest in a professional career with an orchestra began with his participation in Singapore National Youth Orchestra rehearsals, his first experiences of a Western symphony orchestra with strings.

Wong performed with the SAF military band during his national service and suffered a nerve injury to his lips from over-playing the trumpet. While he was recovering, he started composing and formed a group to perform his compositions. At this point he started considering becoming a professional conductor. In 2010, Wong was part of a group that formed the Asian Contemporary Ensemble, which focuses on Singaporean and Asian composers. In 2011, he began studying opera and orchestral conducting at the Hochschule für Musik Hanns Eisler in Berlin, Germany, after receiving the Lee Kuan Yew scholarship. He earned his master's degree in 2014.

Wong debuted in March 2015 with the Singapore Symphony Orchestra. On 12 May 2016, Wong became the first Asian to win the Gustav Mahler Conducting Competition for young conductors, held in Bamberg, Germany. In June 2016, he debuted in China, conducting the China Philharmonic Orchestra, Beijing, the Shanghai Symphony Orchestra and the Guangzhou Symphony Orchestra. He was a finalist for the 2017 Singapore Youth Award of the National Youth Council. In August 2018, he was one of ten Singaporeans mentioned in Prime Minister Lee Hsien Loong's National Day Rally speech.

Wong became chief conductor of the Nuremberg Symphony Orchestra, his first full-time orchestral conducting post, in September 2018. Wong concluded his Nuremberg tenure in August 2022.

Wong conducted the New York Philharmonic's annual Lunar New Year concert in February 2019. In December 2019, the Federal President of Germany awarded him the Order of Merit for his achievements in Singaporean-German cultural relations and the advancement of German music culture abroad. He co-founded Project Infinitude with Marina Mahler, the granddaughter of Gustav Mahler, in 2016 as part of a global music education initiative by the Mahler Foundation.

In March 2021, Wong first guest-conducted the Japan Philharmonic Orchestra (JPO). In August 2021, the JPO appointed Wong as its principal guest conductor, effective September 2021, with an initial contract of 2 years. In May 2022, the JPO announced the appointment of Wong as its next chief conductor, effective with the 2023-2024 season, with an initial contract of 5 years.

Wong first guest-conducted the Dresden Philharmonic in 2021, and returned for a further guest-conducting appearance in 2022. In April 2023, the Dresden Philharmonic announced the appointment as Wong as its next principal guest conductor, as of the 2023-2024 season, with a contract of two seasons.

Wong first guest-conducted The Hallé in February 2023. In June 2023, The Hallé announced the appointment of Wong as its next principal conductor and artistic advisor, effective with the 2024-2025 season, with an initial contract of 5 seasons.

== Awards ==
- 2011 2nd prize – 5th International Competition of Young Conductors Lovro von Matačić
- 2013 1st prize – 4th International Conducting Competition Jeunesses Musicales Bucharest
- 2016 1st prize – 5th Gustav Mahler Conducting Competition
- 2019 Order of Merit of the Federal Republic of Germany

Cultural offices
Preceded by Alexander Shelley	Chief Conductor, Nuremberg Symphony Orchestra; 2018–2022	Succeeded by Jonathan Darlington
Preceded by Pietari Inkinen	Chief Conductor, Japan Philharmonic Orchestra; 2023–present	Succeeded by incumbent
