= Mark Stringer =

American conductor

Mark Stringer (born 1964) is an American conductor.

== Education ==
Stringer used to take music lessons at the Juilliard School, Tanglewood Music Center and Los Angeles Philharmonic Institute at which he was under guidance from such teachers as Seiji Ozawa, Simon Rattle, Michael Tilson Thomas and Leonard Bernstein.

== Conductor ==
His conducting career began in 1989 when he was invited by Leonard Bernstein on two European tours one of which was at Schleswig-Holstein Musik Festival where he performed with Orchestra dell'Accademia Nazionale di Santa Cecilia. From 1991 to 1996 he was a conductor at the Bern Theatre where he conducted such operas as Ligeti's Le Grand Macabre, Mozart's Die Entführung aus dem Serail and Don Giovanni as well as Giuseppe Verdi's Don Giovanni and Rigoletto. Besides those operas he is well known for production of Richard Wagner's The Flying Dutchman and Gioachino Rossini's The Barber of Seville as well as The Merry Widow operetta of Franz Lehar and Leoš Janáček's Káťa Kabanová, among other well respected works.

In 1985 he conducted Richard Strauss's Ariadne auf Naxos which was performed in Spoleto and next year became a conductor of another Gioachino Rossini's work called La Cenerentola in Aspen. Later on, he became Simon Rattle's assistant conductor in Amsterdam and produced him such operas as the 1993 Pelléas et Mélisande and Jenůfa at the Théâtre du Châtelet which came out in 1996. During that year his fame grew, and he began international performances at the La Monnaie Theatre in Brussels. There he conducted couple works of Kurt Weill and by 1998 produced The Cunning Little Vixen at Teatro Real. By the turn of the century his The Makropulos Affair came out and was performed at the Aix-en-Provence Festival. In 2004 he became a successor to Leopold Hager at the University of Music and Performing Arts in the Austrian capital of Vienna which was previously hosted by Clemens Krauss and Hans Swarowsky respectively.

== Guest conductor ==
As a guest conductor he conducted in various Scandinavian countries and performed there in such cities as Bergen, Copenhagen, Gothenburg, Oslo and Stockholm. He also performed with various Benelux orchestras such as the Orchestre Philharmonique du Luxembourg, French Orchestre National Bordeaux Aquitaine, as well as German Deutsches Symphonie-Orchester Berlin and both Saint Paul and Pittsburgh Symphony Orchestras of the United States. He also performed numerous works with various British orchestras such as both Roya Scottish, BBC National, and City of Birmingham Symphony Orchestras. Besides the British orchestras he was a guest conductor of Italian Brno Philharmonic and Orchestra of Italian Switzerland. He also held the same position at both the Vienna and NHK Symphony Orchestras ending with Tokyo Metropolitan Symphony Orchestra guest conducting.

== Recordings ==
His works of Lili Boulanger were published by Timpani Records and won him Editor’s Choice and Choc de repertoire awards in France, England and the United States.
