= Marie Kunkel Zimmerman =

American soprano (1864–1953)

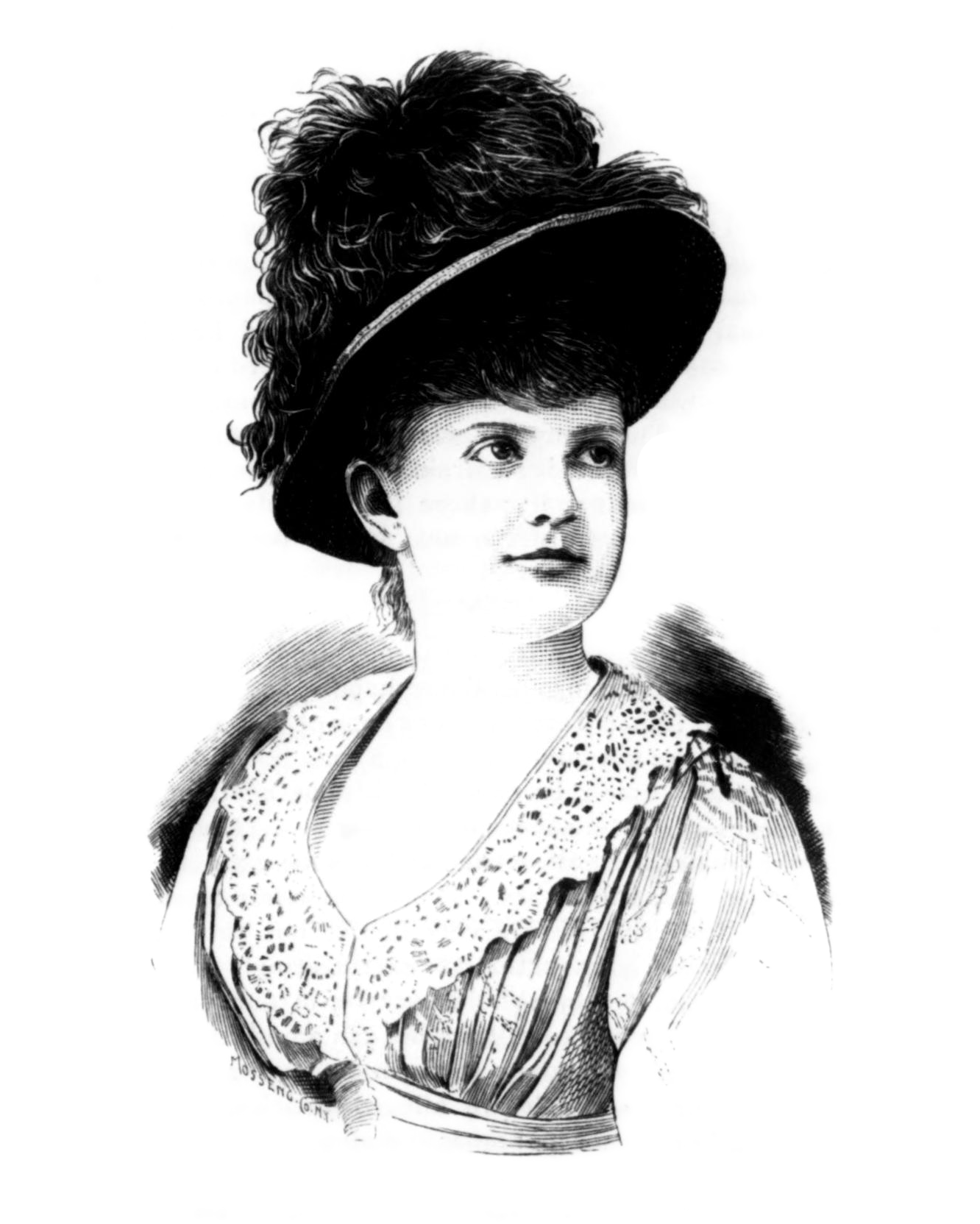
Sketch of Mamie Kunkel (later Marie Kunkel Zimmerman) from the front cover of The Musical Courier on October 2, 1889

Marie Kunkel Zimmerman, born Mamie R. Kunkel, (September 13, 1864 – May 10, 1953) was an American soprano of the concert stage. She began her acting career as a child opposite her father; the theatre manager, blackface minstrel show entertainer, actor, and singer-songwriter George Kunkel. In the early 1880s she began performing as a soprano. She co-authored the suffragist anthem "Votes for Women: Suffrage Rallying Song" with her husband, composer and concert singer Edward M. Zimmerman.

== Early life and career as a child actress ==
Born Mamie R. Kunkel on September 13, 1864, in Baltimore, Maryland, Marie Kunkel Zimmerman was the daughter of theatre manager, actor, and singer George Kunkel Sr. and his wife Addie Kunkel. Her mother was an actress known on the stage as Ada Proctor. Ada was born in Montreal, Canada, and her first marriage was to John Proctor, theatre manager of the Chestnut Street Theatre in Philadelphia. Ada married George Kunkel after her first husband's death. She had a son from her first marriage, the actor John Proctor, who was Mamie's half-brother. George and Ada also had a son, Mamie's brother George Kunkel Jr. (1866–1937). He had a career as a silent film actor and opera singer.

Kunkel began her career on the stage as a child actress under the moniker "Little Mamie Kunkel" in performances with her father. George Kunkel Sr. was a famous blackface performer of the 19th century and was closely associated with the role of Uncle Tom. As early as 1873, Mamie was performing the role of Eva in her father's stage productions of Uncle Tom's Cabin. She was still in the part when the production reached Philadelphia's Chestnut Street Theatre in January 1875 with her mother in the role of Topsy. In 1880 she performed in a production of William Shakespeare's Macbeth at the Holliday Street Theater as part of a theatrical benefit.

== Music education and early singing career in Baltimore ==
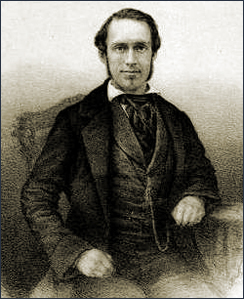
Mamie's father, George Kunkel Sr.

Mamie Kunkel was trained as a soprano at the Peabody Institute in the 1880s. There she was a pupil of voice teacher, conductor, and violinist Edward Heimendahl. She later studied with Anton Seidl in New York.The Musical Courier described her as a dramatic soprano with a rich flexible voice.

Kunkel began performing in concerts as a soprano as early as December 1881 when she was the soprano soloist in a concert of Christmas music at the Protestant Episcopal Church of the Ascension in Baltimore. Soon after, she achieved top ratings in music competitions in that city. On June 3, 1883, she gave a recital at the Taylor Opera House in Trenton, New Jersey. By November of that same year she was performing as a soloist at Baltimore's Trinity Methodist Episcopal Church, South at Madison Avenue & Preston St. In December 1883 she performed in a concert with dentist turned baritone B. Merrill Hopkinson.

In March 1884 Kunkel was the second soprano soloist in Felix Mendelssohn's Elijah with the Oratorio Society of Baltimore and conductor Fritz Finke. On April 11, 1884, she sang Margaret Mackay's hymn "Asleep in Jesus! blessed sleep" at the funeral service of the Reverend John Chester Backus. Both she and her brother performed at a benefit concert to aid their ailing father alongside other Baltimore entertainers at Baltimore's YMCA on May 19, 1884. She became a member of the opera company in residence at the Academy of Music in Baltimore, and in June 1884 portrayed the title role in Franz von Suppé's The Lovely Galatea (English translation by Willard G. Day) on tour with the company to Albaugh's Grand Opera House. A review of her performance praised the quality of her singing, but felt her acting was "too tame".

On January 25, 1885, Mamie's father died. She collaborated with Willard G. Day on a series of public lecture-recitals at Baltimore's YMCA in 1885 in which she would sing a program of songs with thematic ties to particular person Day was lecturing on. For example she sang a program of Scandinavian songs in conjunction with a lecture on Hans Christian Andersen, and gave a program of art songs using texts by Shakespeare when Day gave a lecture on 'The Bard'. In October 1885 she gave a concert at the Concordia Opera House in conjunction with recitations given by the elocutionist Carrie Block.

In 1886 Kunkel was a guest soloist with the Orpheus Quartette for concerts at Baltimore's YMCA. The Orpheus Quartette was an all-male vocal ensemble that was founded by students at Princeton University in the late 1860s. It became a professional group which toured widely in the United States over the next several decades, with new members replacing original singers periodically. She performed in several more concerts of varying kinds at the YMCA through 1888. She continued to work as a church vocalist for a variety of Baltimore churches from 1886 to 1887. In September 1888 she was a guest soloist with the Harmonie Singing Association for their concert at Ford's Grand Opera House.

In January 1889, Kunkel was the soprano soloist in Charles Gounod's La rédemption with the Oratorio Society of Baltimore. A report in the Baltimore Sun on December 26, 1889, states that the soprano was returning to Baltimore for a visit, and was now living in Philadelphia.

== Philadelphia soprano ==
=== Arrival in Philadelphia and a collaborative musical marriage ===
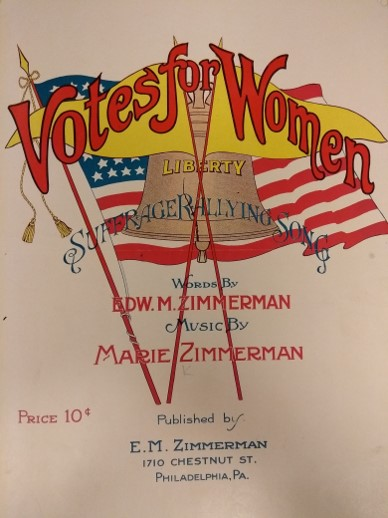
Front cover of 1915 sheet music for "Votes for Woman, Suffrage Rallying Song" by Edward M. and Marie Zimmerman. From the collection of the British Library.

After moving to Philadelphia, Kunkel began performing publicly as either Marie Kunkel or Marie R. Kunkel in 1889. She made her Philadelphia concert debut as Marie R. Kunkel on October 10, 1889, at St. George's Hall. By 1890 she was working as the resident soprano soloist for Philadelphia's Reform Congregation Keneseth Israel. She began appearing in chamber music concerts in the city in 1889 with musicians like pianist Maurits Leefson (1861–1926), violinist and composer Gustav Hille (1850 – ca.1925), and cellist Rudolph Hennig (1845–1904).

In March and November 1890 Kunkel participated in concerts at the Philadelphia Musical Academy. She performed in concert with violinist Max Weil (1869–1952) and pianist and composer Robert Tempest (1868–1955) in November 1890. In February 1891 she performed in concert with the violinist Arthur Hartmann, then a child prodigy of 9 years of age, at St. George's Hall. In May 1891 she was the guest soprano soloist in concerts with the Mendelssohn Club, beginning with performances of music by Adolf Jensen and Johannes Brahms at Musical Fund Hall in mid-May, and ending with a Memorial Day concert of patriotic music given at the Academy of Music, Philadelphia. In March 1892 she starred in a concert version of the opera Melusina by Conradin Kreutzer.

In September 1892 Kunkel's mother, Addie Kunkel Proctor, died in the Philadelphia home of her half-brother, John Proctor. On November 30, 1892, she married the bass, composer, and conductor Edward M. Zimmerman. After this she was known as Marie Kunkel Zimmerman.

Kunkel Zimmerman would frequently sing in concerts with her husband, both before and after their marriage. They were both featured vocal soloists in a concert given at the Music Teachers National Association's convention at Philadelphia's Musical Fund Hall in November 1889. They sang together in a vocal quartet which performed in chamber music concerts sponsored by the Manuscript Music Society of Philadelphia at Musical Fund Hall in 1895 and 1897.

In February 1896 the Zimmermans were soloists in Louis Spohr's God, Thou Art Great: Opus 98: a Sacred Cantata for Four Voices which was performed at the Drexel Institute (now Drexel University) in a memorial concert for the Philadelphia concert pianist and music teacher Charles H. Jarvis (1837–1895). The following April they were the soprano and bass soloists in Joseph Haydn's The Creation at Philadelphia's Association Hall; a work they repeated at that same theatre in May 1898. In October 1898 the couple were part of the soloist quartet in the Philadelphia premiere of Liza Lehmann's song-cycle In a Persian garden at Witherspoon Hall.

Together, the Zimmermans created the song "Votes for Women: Suffrage Rallying Song" (1915) which contained music by Marie and lyrics by Edward. It was dedicated to Anna Howard Shaw, President of the National American Woman Suffrage Association. The song is part of the collections of the British Library and Library of Congress, and is a notable example of music used in the women's suffrage movement in the United States.

Kunkel Zimmerman and her husband were both voice teachers in Philadelphia. They operated their own vocal studio together. Edward M. Zimmerman died of Bright's disease on December 6, 1922, at Jewish Hospital in Philadelphia.

=== Rising concert singer ===
In April 1893 Kunkel Zimmerman sang the role of the Widow in Mendelssohn's Elijah with the Germantown choral society. On May 17, 1893, she performed in the first concert organized by the Manuscript Musical Society; performing the soprano solo in the cantata Delosain and Erato by Henry Gordon Thunder (1832–1881) at Musical Fund Hall with the Germania Orchestra being led by conductor William W. Gilchrist. In February 1894 she gave a recital to raise money for charity at the Chestnut Street Theatre.

In February 1895 Kunkel Zimmerman returned to Musical Fund Hall to perform in a concert with baritone Kirk Towns that was conducted by W. H. Neidlinger. In March 1895 she performed excerpts from Jules Massenet's Hérodiade with the Mendelssohn Club. She was a guest soloist with the Baltimore's Germania Männerchor in December 1895 for a concert celebrating the 125th anniversary of Beethoven's birth. With that choir she was the soprano soloist in Beethoven's Choral Fantasy, and later in the program she performed arias from The Marriage of Figaro and lieder by Robert Schumann.

A December 1896 article in The Philadelphia Inquirer described Kunkel Zimmerman as Philadelphia's leading soprano, and soon after this she appeared in a series of concerts at the Academy of Music with the "Philadelphia Symphony Society" (precursor to the Philadelphia Orchestra).

== National concert soprano ==
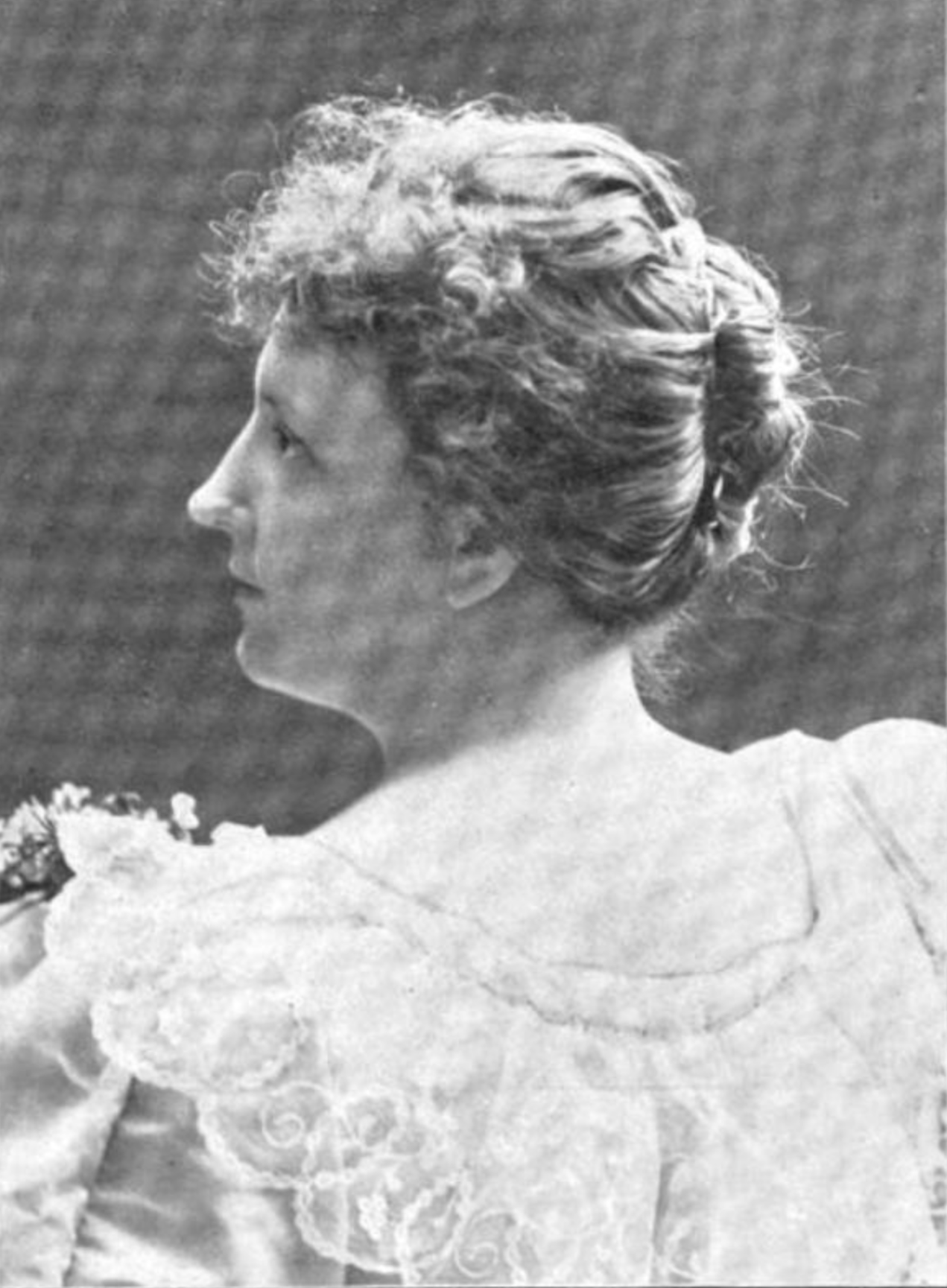
c. 1900 photograph of Marie Kunkel Zimmerman by Frederick Gutekunst.

In April 1900 Kunkel Zimmerman was a soloist in Joseph Haydn's The Creation at the Brooklyn Academy of Music with the Brooklyn Oratorio Society and conductor Gustav Dannreuther. In December 1900 she was the soprano soloist in George Frideric Handel's Messiah with the Handel and Haydn Society and the Boston Symphony Orchestra (BSO) at Symphony Hall, Boston. In 1901 she was the soprano soloist in Felix Mendelssohn's Elijah at The May Festival of the University of Michigan under conductor Albert Augustus Stanley (1851–1932). In 1904 she was the soprano soloist with The People's Choral Union of Boston at Symphony Hall.

Kunkel Zimmerman was a soloist in many concerts with the Philadelphia Orchestra given between 1902 and 1907, including as the soprano soloist in Beethoven's Symphony No. 9 for conductor Fritz Scheel's final performance with the orchestra on February 8, 1907. She had previously performed the ninth symphony with the BSO at the Worcester Music Festival, Massachusetts, in 1905. Her collaborators in this latter concert included bass Herbert Witherspoon, tenor Clarence B. Shirley, contralto Helen Allen Hunt, and conductor Franz Kneisel. She also performed Anton Bruckner's Te Deum with the BSO in 1905, and that same year gave a concert sponsored by Bishop Henry Y. Satterlee of the Episcopal Diocese of Washington at the Lafayette Square Opera House in Washington, D.C. In February 1905 she was the soprano soloist in Giuseppe Verdi's Requiem with the New Haven Oratorio Society under the direction of Horatio Parker. Her fellow soloists included contralto Gertrude May Stein, tenor Edward Johnson, and bass Frank Croxton.

In July 1907 Kunkel Zimmerman was the soprano soloist in Arthur Sullivan's The Golden Legend with the Chicago Symphony Orchestra (CSO). She had previously been the soprano soloist for the CSO's May 1906 performances of Joseph Haydn's The Creation. She spent several months touring North America with conductor Alexander von Fielitz and the CSO in 1907, performing in both large and small cities, including Toronto, Phoenix, Arizona, San Francisco, Dubuque, Iowa, San Antonio, Ypsilanti, Michigan, and Kokomo, Indiana.

In 1908 Kunkel Zimmerman was the soprano soloist in a concert of music by J. S. Bach given as part of a Bach Festival in Montclair, New Jersey. In 1910 she was the soprano soloist in Horatio Parker's oratorio Hora novissima for concerts in Philadelphia. In 1913 she was the soprano soloist in a concert celebrating the centennial of Richard Wagner's birth at Philadelphia's Convention Hall. In 1915 she was the soprano soloist in a concert with the Mendelssohn Club and conductor William W. Gilchrist at the Philadelphia Academy of Music.

== Later life ==
In 1915 Kunkel Zimmerman served on a committee of examiners for the Philadelphia Orchestra responsible for auditioning and selecting choral vocalists for the United States premiere of Gustav Mahler's Symphony No. 8; a work given its American premiere by that orchestra on March 2, 1916. In 1917 she was appointed a co-director of The Department for the Relief of Deserving Musicians which was one of the three original branches of The Presser Foundation; a charity organization in Philadelphia established by the philanthropist and music publisher Theodore Presser. She was still performing in churches as late as March 1919, when the Philadelphia Inquirer reported on her performing Gounod's Gallia at First Presbyterian Church in Germantown.

Marie Kunkel Zimmerman died in Philadelphia on May 12, 1953, at the age of 88.
