= Music and women's suffrage in the United States =

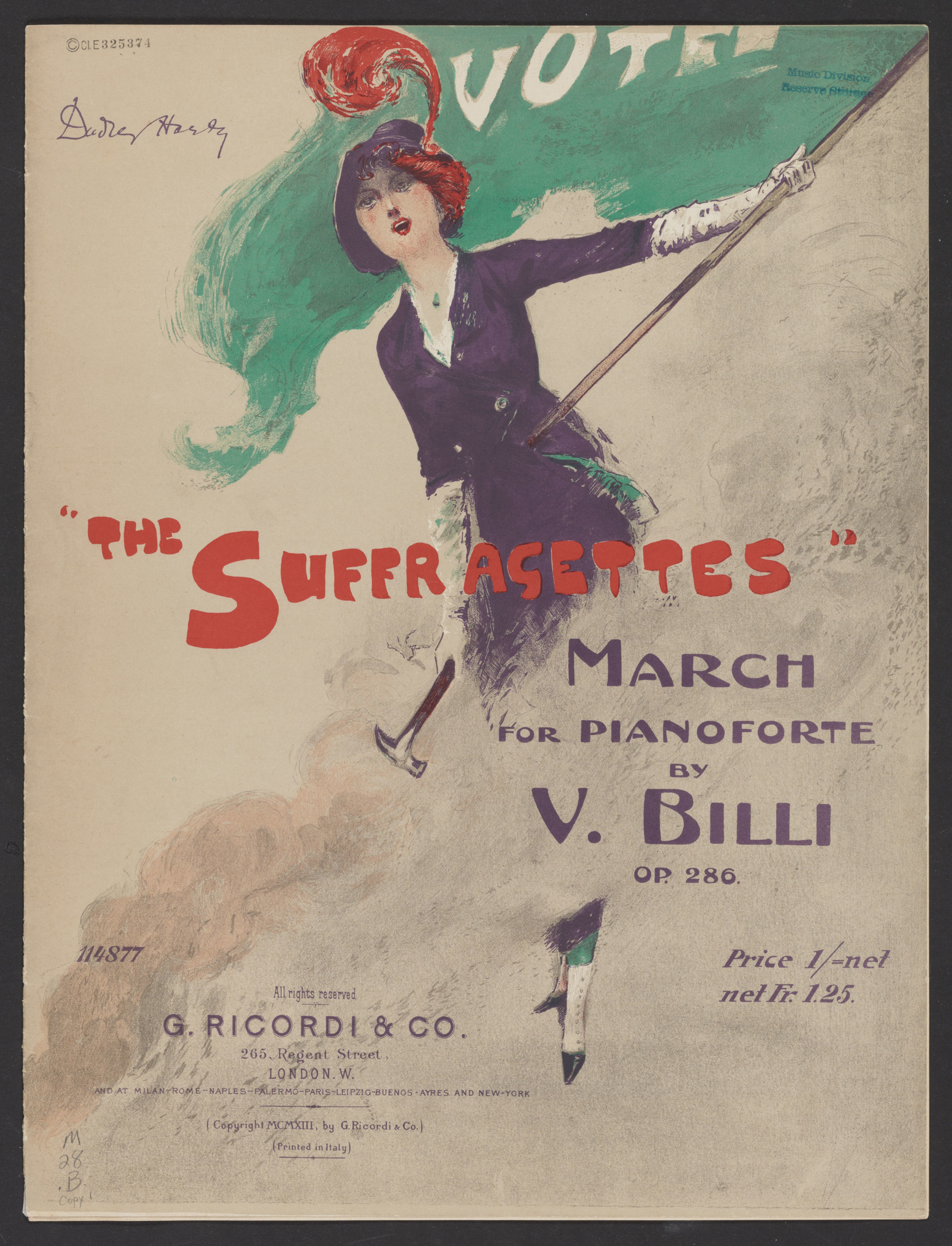
Example of music supporting women's suffrage.

Music was often used in the women's suffrage movement in the United States. Music played an instrumental role in the parades, rallies, and conventions that were held and attended by suffragists. The songs, written for the cause, unified women from varying geographic and socioeconomic positions because the empowering lyrics were set to widely known tunes. Singing was expected from women, whereas political speaking was discouraged, which meant the use of music provided women with an outlet to voice their political opinion. Music made a significant impact on women's rights efforts throughout the twentieth century. It also continues to be a medium to remember past suffrage efforts and promote feminism today.

== Bringing women together ==
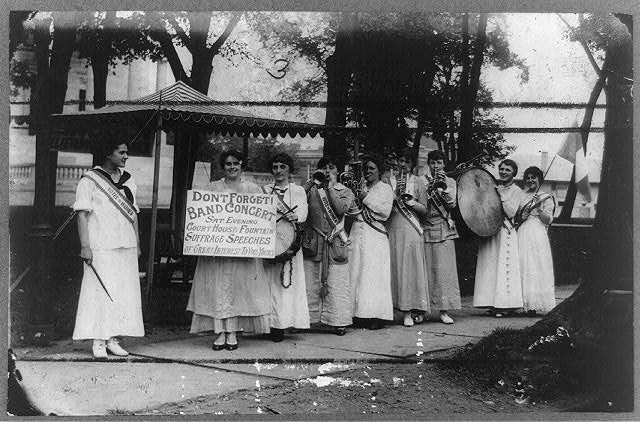
Suffragists with instruments advertise a show in Hackensack, New Jersey.

The United States’ Women's Suffrage movement involved thousands of women, each with differing backgrounds. One way that the movement was made accessible to many was through music. Lyrics to suffragist songs were often original sociopolitical commentary. However these songs were generally written as alternative lyrics and set to well-known tunes. For example, in The Suffrage Song Book, the song "Three Blind Men" is set to the air of "Three Blind Mice": The title page of this book is a compilation of, "Original Songs...adapted to Popular Melodies." The use of popular melodies, meant that women from varying circumstances and backgrounds could sing the songs. Most songs were not written as sheet music, but instead were printed as stanzas of lyrics. The tune was simply placed within the heading of the song. This made it more accessible to lower class women who were not musically trained. This also reduced the price of printing allowing for wider distribution. These books were compiled into books called "songsters". These "songsters" relied on their shared cultural experience of nursery rhymes and common hymns to unify everyone.

== History ==
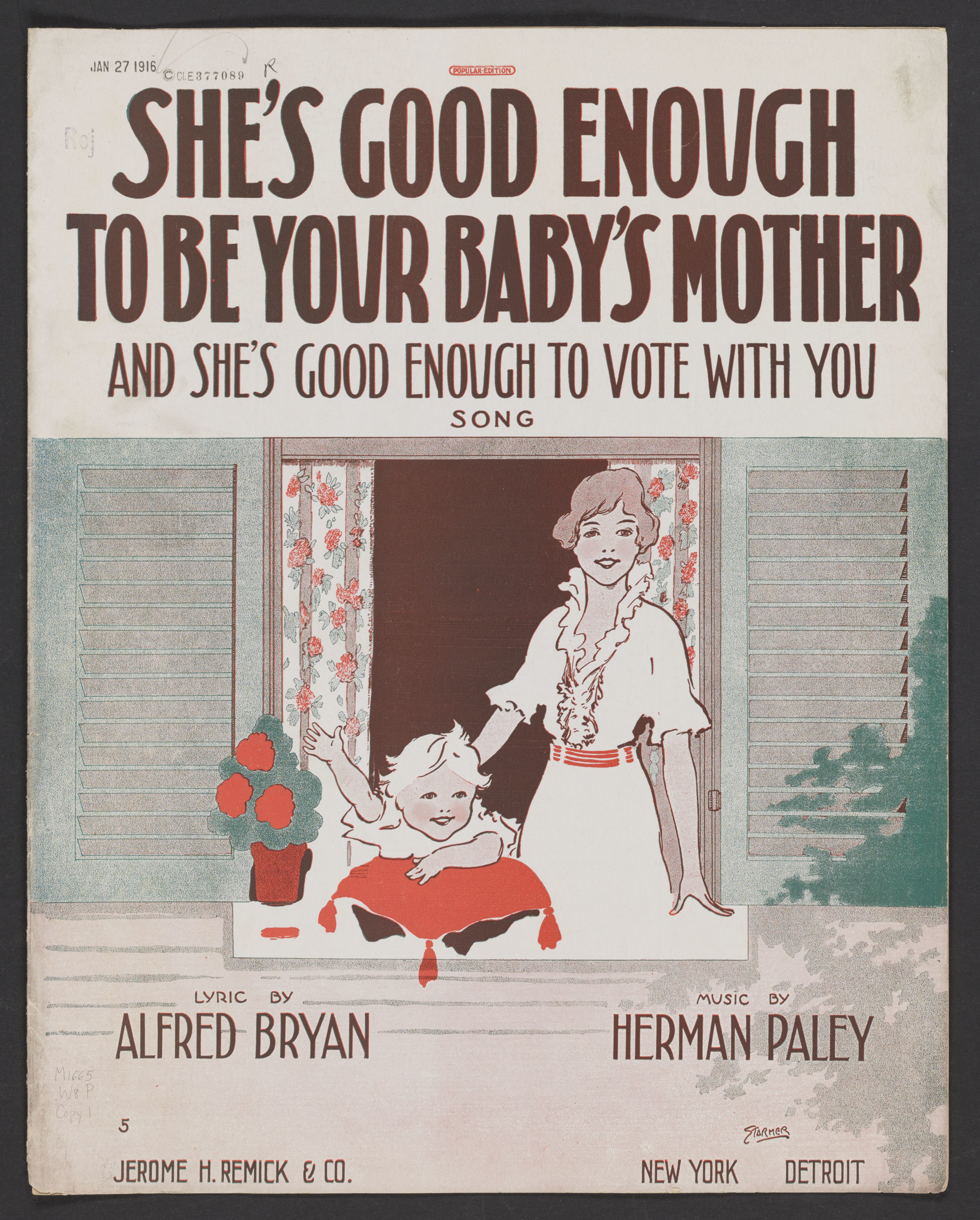
"She's Good Enough To Be Your Baby's Mother and She's Good Enough to Vote With You" Song by Herman Paley and Alfred Bryan, 1916

"Fall In Line Suffrage March," Victor Military Band, recorded July 15, 1914

Prior to the twentieth century, women were expected to remain silent, particularly in regards to political matters. With a few exceptions, the voice of the United States was predominantly male. Although some women, including Abigail Adams, fought for rights in the early days of the nation, women were given little political representation. Finally, in the mid-nineteenth century, the fight for women's rights came together in an organized fashion in Seneca Falls, New York. The Seneca Falls Convention sparked the fire that led to the first wave of feminism in the US. Despite the strength that came from their drive, it remained incredibly difficult for them to speak for themselves on matters involving their government.

During the nineteenth century, most Americans were a part of different Christian denominations. Although each congregation was different, hymns were a common way for members to come together in worship. Women grew up using their voices to sing their praises of God and Jesus Christ. Unable to preach, it was one of the few ways they could express their feelings in churches. Toward the end of the nineteenth century, women began to write their own hymns with the purpose of sharing their testimonies and experiences through their own words. Despite the initial backlash they received from men in their churches, many women became successful hymnists. As women across the nation worked to have their voice heard in the churches, suffragists struggled against the political silence that had been forced upon them for decades. However, the success of female hymnists showed that songs could be a powerful way to express their desire for equality.

Women's role in composing hymns would eventually evolve into writing music for the Suffrage movement. Several songs were written in response to the Seneca Falls Convention, including "Women's Rights Convention Waltz," arranged by Julia F. Baker and "Woman's Rights, a Right Good Ballad," by Kate Horn. Baker's song is more supportive of a change in women's rights, while Horn's work emphasizes traditional values. Many of the women's suffrage songs written after the Seneca Falls Convention can be divided into "rally songs" and "songs of persuasion." Rally songs were more likely to be printed as single-sheet papers or published as songsters, but persuasive songs tended to be published commercially and could make their way more easily into women's homes. Some suffrage music written in the late nineteenth century implied, hopefully, that women would soon have the right to vote, including "Daughters of Freedom! The Ballot Be Yours," by George Cooper and Edwin Christie, published in 1871 and the 1881 "Shall Women Vote" by Joseph D. Payne.

The Hutchinson Family Singers helped develop the women's suffrage music tradition. Elizabeth Cady Stanton wrote in the History of Woman Suffrage that the family actively worked to help the cause through music, especially in Kansas in 1867. Lucy Stone encouraged the family to help the suffragists as "singing evangelists." For the campaign, John W. Hutchinson co-wrote "The Kansas Suffrage Song," which was sung to the tune of "Old Dan Tucker." On the election day, the Hutchinson family traveled with Stanton and Susan B. Anthony to all the polling places in Leavenworth, Kansas. The activists gave speeches and the Hutchinsons sang suffrage songs. During the next Kansas campaign in 1881, the Hutchinson returned and Stanton wrote that the Hutchinsons' songs were able to appeal to emotions and hearts in a way that speakers and lecturers could not.

Suffrage organizations began to compile and sell songs that were heard at rallies and meetings. The South Dakota Suffrage Organization printed a twenty page songster in 1888 and sold it for ten cents at their Huron headquarters. The American Woman Suffrage Association (AWSA) printed their own book in 1889 and sold it for fifteen cents. National American Woman Suffrage Association (NAWSA) conventions would sometimes list song leaflets for suffragists at their conventions. NAWSA often borrowed imagery from the women's suffrage movement in the United Kingdom to illustrate sheet music covers. In 1896, NAWSA also published suggestions for suffrage meetings, which included words for rally songs. Selling music helped fund suffrage organizations and it also brought the music and ideas into the home of Americans. Plays or pantomimes set to music were also popular with suffragists.

Another example of how singing provided a voice for women during protests was seen in Los Angeles. Prior to their protest on July 14, 1911, "prohibitive ordinances" had been enacted. Women who wanted to protest had been told by the authorities that they were unable to if they made political speeches. The women managed to maneuver around this ordinance by setting their speeches to music. Instead of speaking their political rhetoric they instead sang their sentiments. Similarly in 1917, music was used again in the fight for women's rights when six women were arrested for protesting outside of the White House. In response the women formed a song service which sparked song competitions across the country wherein the public could write and submit their own suffragist music.

Over time, the most popular song collection was compiled in 1912 by Eugenie M. Raye-Smith. This collection, called the "Equal Suffrage Song Sheaf," had twenty-five different songs and was dedicated to Anna Howard Shaw. Raye-Smith, a professor and editor of the Woman Lawyers Journal, had often been called on to write music for the suffrage movement before she died in 1914. The Detroit Free Press wrote in 1914 that "Since suffrage has become popular and more or less fashionable, the different suffrage societies have spent a great deal of their time answering the hundreds of people who are continually sending in suggestions for songs and suffrage trinkets." All women's suffrage song sheets and songsters were popular until women earned the right to vote in 1920.

=== African American and Native American women ===
Adella Hunt Logan wrote "Just As Well As He" in 1912 based on the tune and poem of "Comin' Through the Rye." Her version turns an objectification of women into a song of strength and a plea for full enfranchisement. Frances Ellen Watkins Harper also wrote song lyrics like her "Songs for the People."

Often, however, African Americans and Native Americans alike were used as "punchlines" to make the point that it was ridiculous that white women were unable to vote. If Black men could vote, then why couldn't white women some of these songs asked. "American Citizens Who Cannot Vote" and "Is It Right?" were both songs that asked this question. The idea was "meant to shock by placing white women—the embodiment of 'civilization'--on par with incompetent and mentally incapacitated men."

== Anti-suffrage music ==
Anti-suffragists often used red and specifically, a red rose, as their symbol. This often appeared on covers for their sheet music.

== Legacy ==
Music continues to be a medium to promote feminism today. As the second wave of feminism began to develop there was a resurgence in suffragist songs. This famously included the, "Sister Suffragette" song in the hit 1964 Disney film Mary Poppins. Well known hymns were used again during this time period. The Battle Hymn of the Republic was parodied by women in a suffrage style song during a Women's Liberation March at Harvard. The song was entitled, "The Battle Hymn of Women," replacing the lyrics, "glory, glory hallelujah," with, "move on over or we'll move on over you." The introduction of the Equal Rights Amendment (ERA) in the 1970s led to the rise of pop culture songs playing a role in the feminist movement. This included songs such as Lesely Gore's, "You Don't Own Me," and "Respect" by Aretha Franklin. In fact, in December 1972, Helen Reddy's, "I Am Woman,'' topped the music charts at number one. Evidence that this year was important for women's rights as Shirley Chilsom was running for President and Roe v. Wade had reached courts. Music continues to play a huge role in women's empowerment and modern day feminist movements with the creation of songs such as Beyonce's, “Who Runs the World," and Taylor Swift's, "The Man," which aim to commentate on the current status of women.

Music is also being used to teach about the suffragette movement and nineteenth amendment. For example, Soomo Learning released a parody of Lady Gaga's "Bad Romance," called Bad Romance: Women's Suffrage. The video centers around the famous American Suffragette Alice Paul. Similarly, the educational television program Horrible Histories released "The Suffragettes’ Song," a song relating events of women's suffrage. These songs have been used as tools to recount to younger generations and educate them on the struggle towards women's rights.

== Selected suffrage songs ==
"The Franchise: Campaign March for Suffrage" by Norman Chester, 1914

- "American Citizens Who Cannot Vote – The Indian, the Chinaman, the Idiot and the Woman," by Nettie Bacon Christian, 1895.
- "Another Star," words by Charlotte Perkins Gilman, tune: "Buy a Broom," 1911.
- "Clear the Way, For Woman Voting," Words by: John W. Hutchinson. Music by: John W. Hutchinson, 1868.
- "Fall in Line – Suffrage March," Recorded by Victor Military Band, July 15, 1914.
- "Female Suffrage," words and music by R.A. Cohen, 1867.
- "Give Us the Ballot – Dedicated to the Political Equality Club of Emmetsburg, Iowa," by Lila C. Bliven, 1897.
- "Human Equality," Words by: William Lloyd Garrison, 1871. Music: Tune – "A Man's a Man, For a’ That."
- "Just As Well As He," words by Adella Hunt Logan, 1912, to the tune of "Comin' Through the Rye."
- "Kansas Suffrage Song," words by P.P. Fowler and John W. Hutchinson, music: Tune – "Old Dan Tucker," 1867.
- "Let Us All Speak Our Minds If We Die for It," words by: William Brough, music by: J. Gaspard Maeder, 1863.
- "Let Woman Vote" Words by Electa S. Kellogg, music by T. Martin Towne, 1869.
- "The March of the Women," by Ethel Smyth, 1914.
- "New Battle Hymn of the Republic," words by: Catharine A.F. Stebbins. Music: Air – "John Brown's Body."
- "Our Suffrage Song," words by: L. May Wheeler, music the air of "Hold the Fort."
- "Rights of Ladies," words by Dennis McFlinn, music by "Van," 1875.
- "Rights of Woman," words, "By A Lady," music to the tune of "God Save America," 1795.
- "Shall Women Vote," words by Joseph D. Payne, 1881.
- "She's Good Enough to be Your Baby's Mother and She's Good Enough to Vote with You," words by Alfred Bryan, music by Herman Paley, 1916.
- "The Socialist and The Suffragist," words and music by Charlotte Perkins Gilman, 1911.
- "Suffrage March," lyrics and music by Lucenia W. Richards, 1914.
- "Votes for Women: Suffrage Rallying Song" (1915) with words by Edward M. Zimmerman and music by Marie Zimmerman, dedicated to Anna Howard Shaw
- "Vote It Right Along!" words and music by John W. Hutchinson, 1869.
- "The Women's Marseillaise."
- "Woman's Rights, A Right Good Ballad Rightly Illustrating Woman's Rights Music and Poetry 'Rightly' Written for the Womans Rights Convention," words and music by Kate Horn, 1853.
- "Women's Rights Convention Waltz," music by Julia F. Baker, 1853.

== See also ==
- Art in the women's suffrage movement in the United States
- Women's suffrage in the United States
- Timeline of women's suffrage in the United States
- Women in music
