= 1856 Republican National Convention =

American political convention

- 1856 presidential election
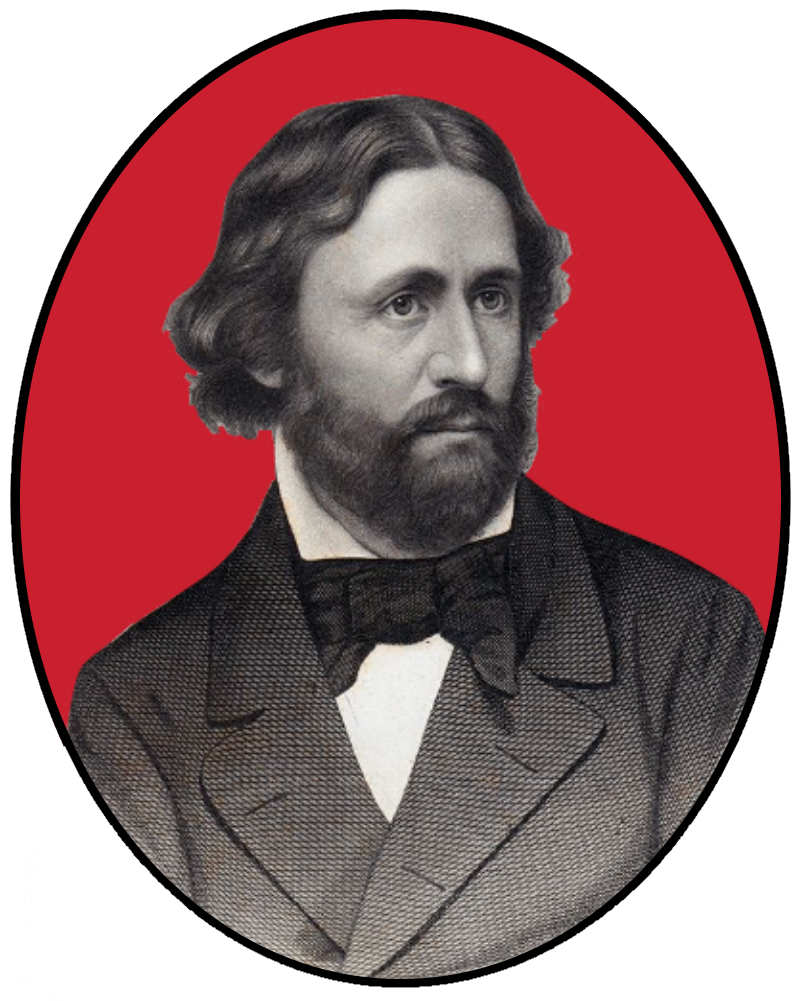
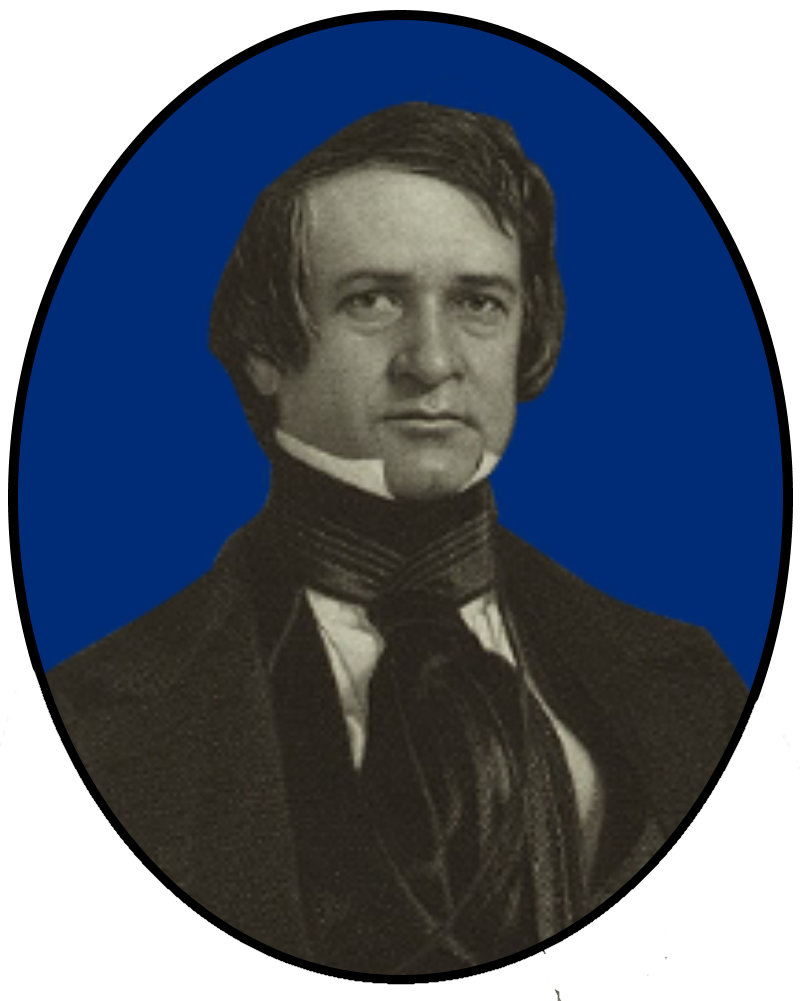
- Nominees; Frémont and Dayton

Convention
- Dates: June 17–19, 1856
- City: Philadelphia, Pennsylvania, U.S.
- Venue: Musical Fund Hall at 808 Locust Street, Philadelphia, Pennsylvania, U.S.

Candidates
- Presidential nominee: John C. Frémont of California
- Vice-presidential nominee: William L. Dayton of New Jersey

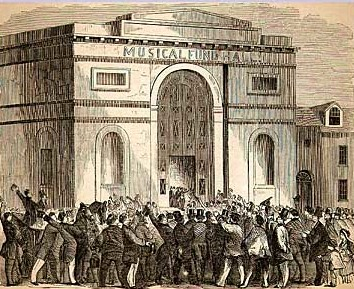
Woodcut illustrating the crowd outside Musical Fund Hall at the 1856 Republican National Convention venue in Philadelphia

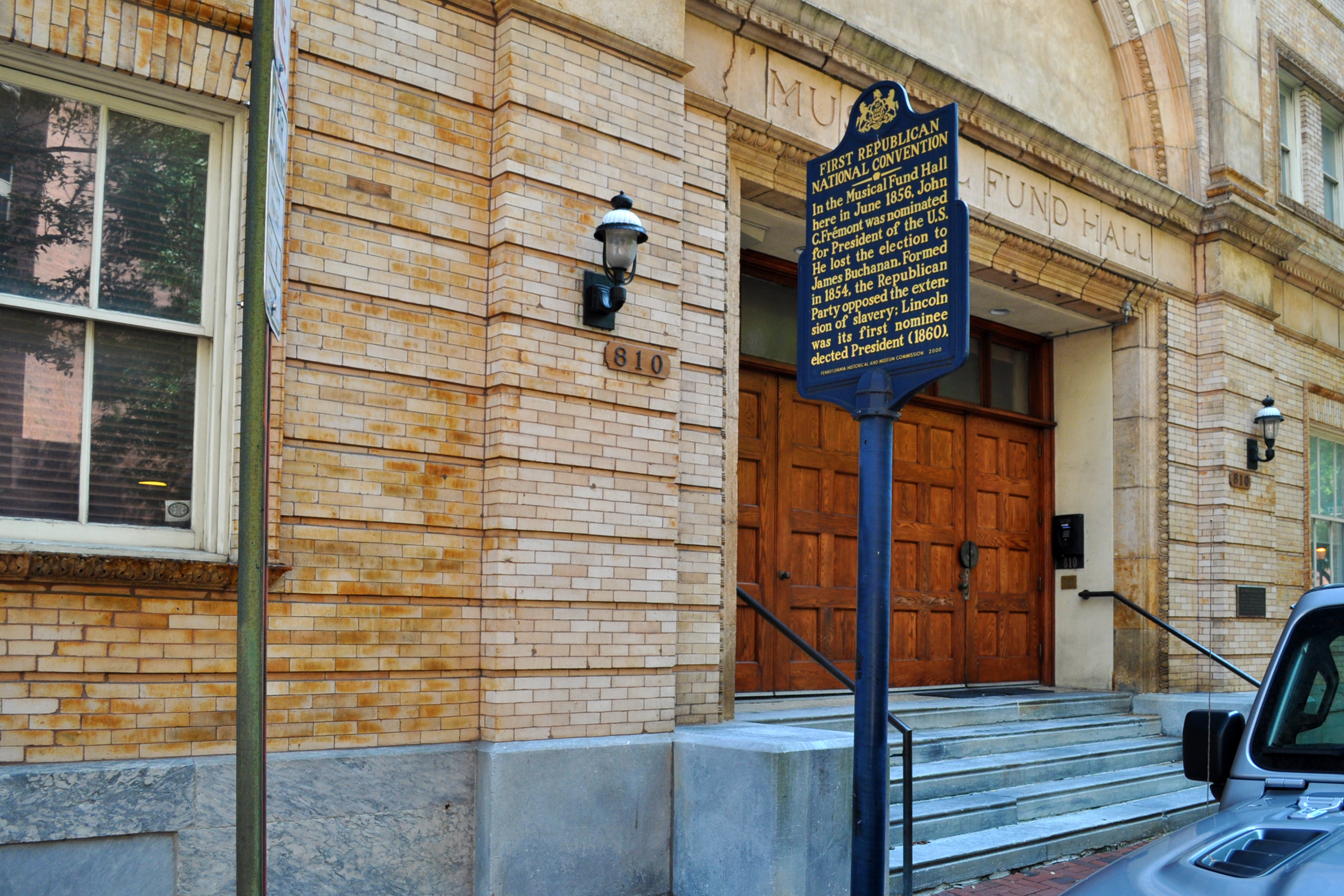
First Republican National Convention Historical Marker at 810 Locust Street in Philadelphia, the site of Musical Fund Hall, where the first Republican National Convention was held between June 17 and June 19, 1856

The 1856 Republican National Convention was a presidential nominating convention that met from June 17 to June 19, 1856, at Musical Fund Hall at 808 Locust Street in Philadelphia, Pennsylvania. It was the first national nominating convention of the Republican Party, founded two years earlier in 1854. It was held to nominate the party's candidates for president and vice president in the 1856 election. The convention selected John C. Frémont, a former United States Senator from California, for president, and former Senator William L. Dayton of New Jersey for vice president. The convention also appointed members of the newly established Republican National Committee.

The Republican Party had been organized by opponents of the expansion of slavery in the territories following the passage of the 1854 Kansas–Nebraska Act. With William Seward, Salmon P. Chase, and Charles Sumner all taking their names out of consideration, Frémont entered the Republican convention as the front-runner for the presidential nomination. Frémont had previously been nominated by the North American Party, which consisted of anti-slavery members of the American Party who were unwilling to support the American Party candidate, Millard Fillmore. Though Associate Justice John McLean of Ohio had the backing of some delegates, Frémont clinched the presidential nomination on the first formal ballot of the Republican convention.

Dayton was nominated on the first formal vice-presidential ballot, defeating former Congressman Abraham Lincoln of Illinois and several other candidates. The Republican ticket carried several Northern states in the general election, but the Democratic ticket of James Buchanan and John C. Breckinridge won the 1856 election.

== History ==
=== Background ===
On June 19, 1855, a small gathering of like-minded individuals met in Washington, D.C. where they passed a resolution noting the recent abrogation of "all compromises, real or imaginary" by the opening of Kansas Territory and Nebraska Territory to the possible institution of slavery. These proclaimed themselves the "Republican Association of Washington, District of Columbia" and passed a simple four plank platform including the demand that "There should be neither slavery nor involuntary servitude, except for the punishment of crime, in any of the Territories of the United States." A number of state organizations were soon established along similar lines and the Republican Party was effectively born.

On January 17, 1856, representatives of Republican Party organizations in Ohio, Massachusetts, Pennsylvania, Vermont, and Wisconsin, all Northern states in which slavery was prohibited, issued a joint call for an "informal Convention" to be held in Pittsburgh, on February 22, 1856, in order to perfect the national organization and to call a formal, properly delegated national convention to nominate candidates for President and Vice-President of the United States for the forthcoming November 1856 election. The gathering elected a governing National Executive Committee and passed various resolutions calling for the repeal of laws enabling slaveholding in free territories and "resistance by Constitutional means of Slavery in any Territory," defense of anti-slavery individuals in Kansas who were coming under physical attack, and a call to "resist and overthrow the present National Administration" of Franklin Pierce, "as it is identified with the progress of the Slave power to national supremacy." One speaker from Kansas was Samuel Newitt Wood who was central to all of the Bleeding Kansas events and according to The New York Times was the "lion of the evening."

The 22-member Republican National Committee, which included one representative from each state attending the Pittsburgh Convention, met in plenary session on March 27, 1856, at the Willard Hotel in Washington, D.C., and issued a call for a formal presidential nominating convention. This was slated to begin on June 17, 1856, in Philadelphia. Each state organization was to be allocated six at-large delegates, plus three delegates for each congressional district.

=== North American Party convention ===
The candidates to be nominated by the new Republican party were first nominated by the anti-slavery rump of the American Party.

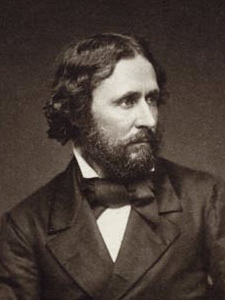
Senator
John C. Frémont
of California

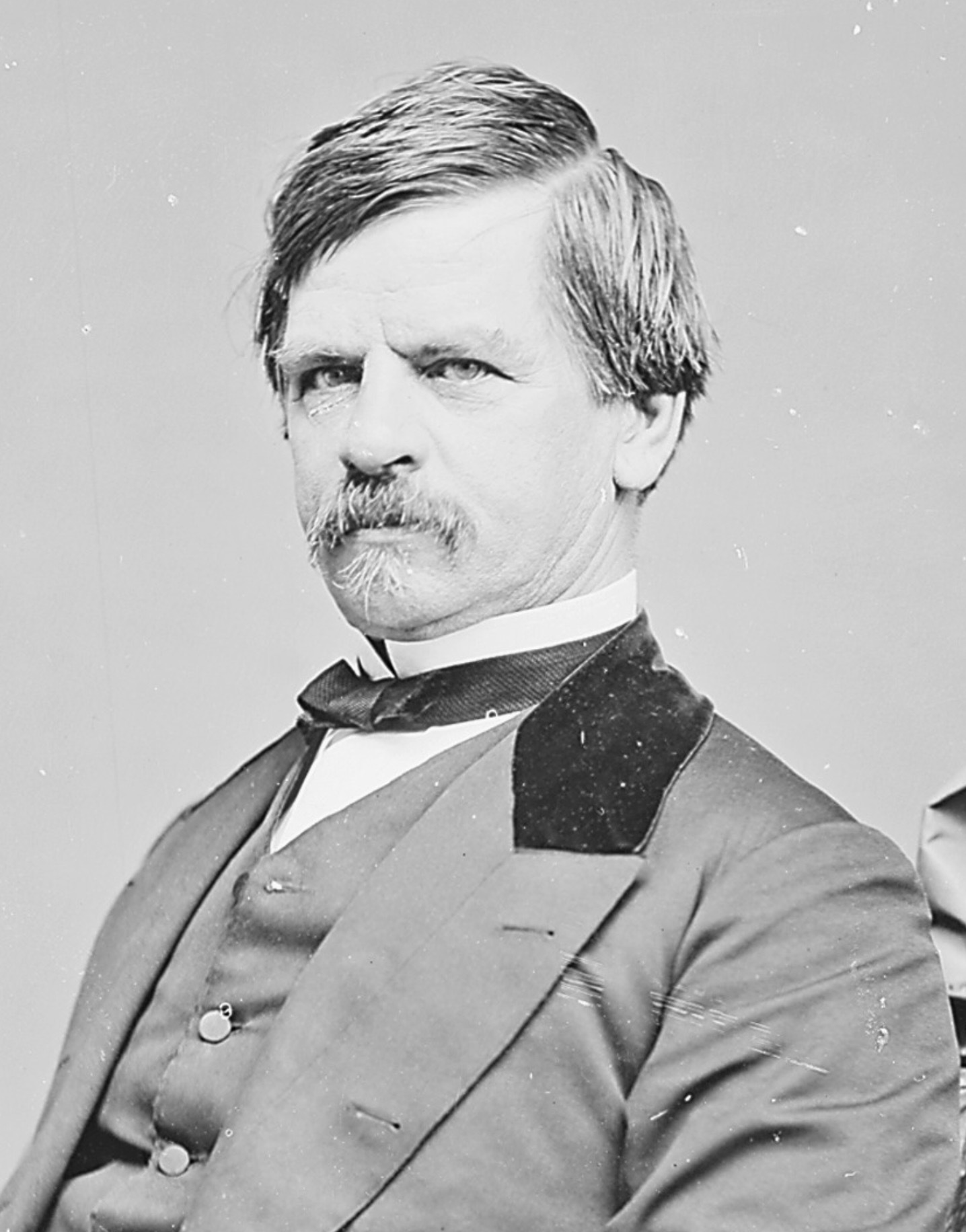
Speaker
Nathaniel P. Banks
from Massachusetts
(declined nomination)

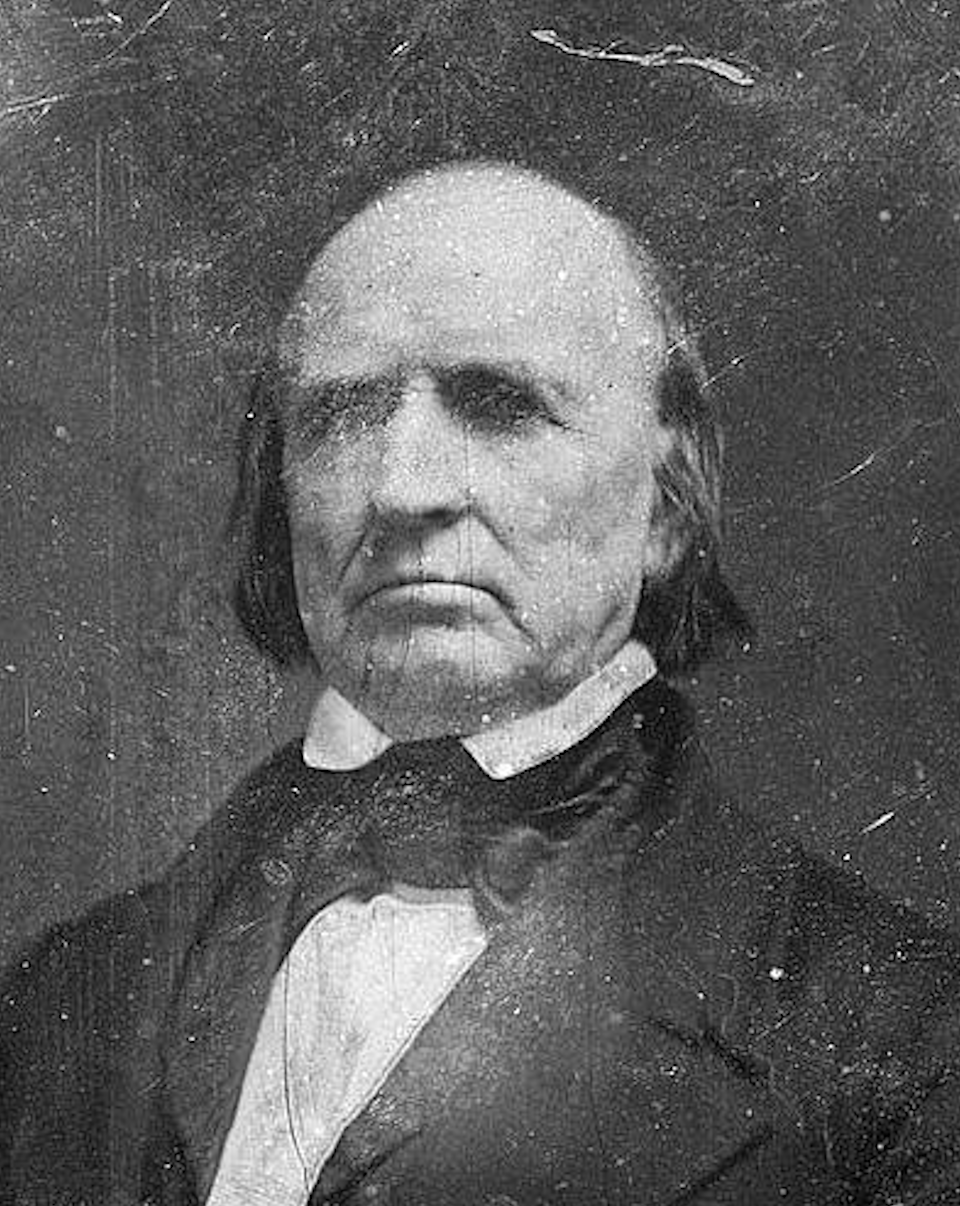
Associate Justice
John McLean
of Ohio

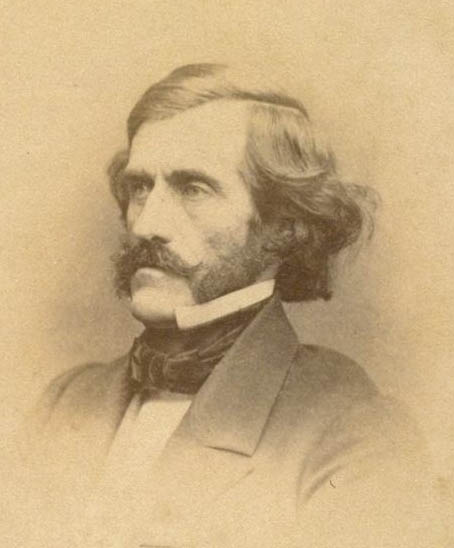
Senator
Robert F. Stockton
of New Jersey

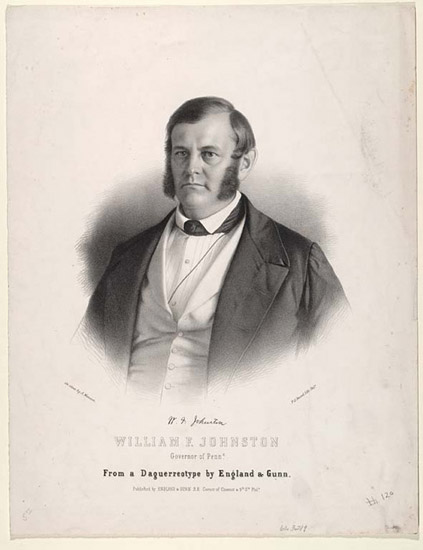
Governor
William F. Johnston
of Pennsylvania

American party members from the North who were opposed to slavery formed their own party after the nomination of former President Millard Fillmore in Philadelphia. This party called for its national convention to be held in New York, New York, just before the Republican National Convention. Party leaders hoped to nominate a joint ticket with the Republicans to defeat Buchanan. The national convention was held on June 12 to 20, 1856 in New York. As John C. Frémont was the favorite to attain the Republican nomination there was a considerable desire for the North American party to nominate him, but it was feared that in doing so they may possibly injure his chances to actually become the Republican nominee. The delegates voted repeatedly on a nominee for president without a result. Nathaniel P. Banks was nominated for president on the 10th ballot over John C. Frémont and John McLean, with the understanding that he would withdraw from the race and endorse John C. Frémont once he had won the Republican nomination. The delegates, preparing to return home, unanimously nominated Frémont on the 11th ballot shortly after his nomination by the Republican Party in Philadelphia. The chairman of the convention, William F. Johnston, had been nominated to run for vice-president, but later withdrew when the North Americans and the Republicans failed to find an acceptable accommodation between him and the Republican nominee, William Dayton.

Convention vote
Presidential ballots	1	2	3	4	5	6	7	8	9	10	11	Vice-presidential ballot	
Nathaniel P. Banks	43	48	46	47	46	45	51	50	50	53	0	William F. Johnston	59
John C. Frémont	34	36	37	37	31	29	29	27	28	18	92	Thomas Ford	16
John McLean	19	10	2	29	33	40	41	40	30	24	0	John C. Frémont	12
Robert F. Stockton	14	20	18	0	0	0	0	0	0	0	0	Scattering	21
William F. Johnston	6	1	15	0	0	0	0	0	0	0	0		
Scattering	5	0	0	0	1	2	0	0	0	0	0		

== The first Republican convention ==
The first Republican National Convention was held in the Musical Fund Hall in Philadelphia, Pennsylvania, on June 17–19, 1856. It was led by Robert Emmet as temporary chairman and Henry S. Lane as the permanent chairman. The convention approved an anti-slavery platform that called for congressional sovereignty in the territories, an end to polygamy in Mormon settlements, and federal assistance for a transcontinental railroad. Kentucky was the only southern state to have a delegation at the convention.

== Presidential nomination ==
=== Presidential candidates ===
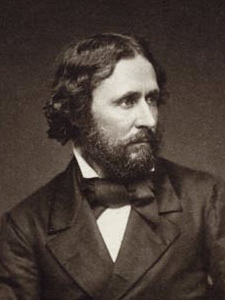
Former Senator
John C. Frémont
of California

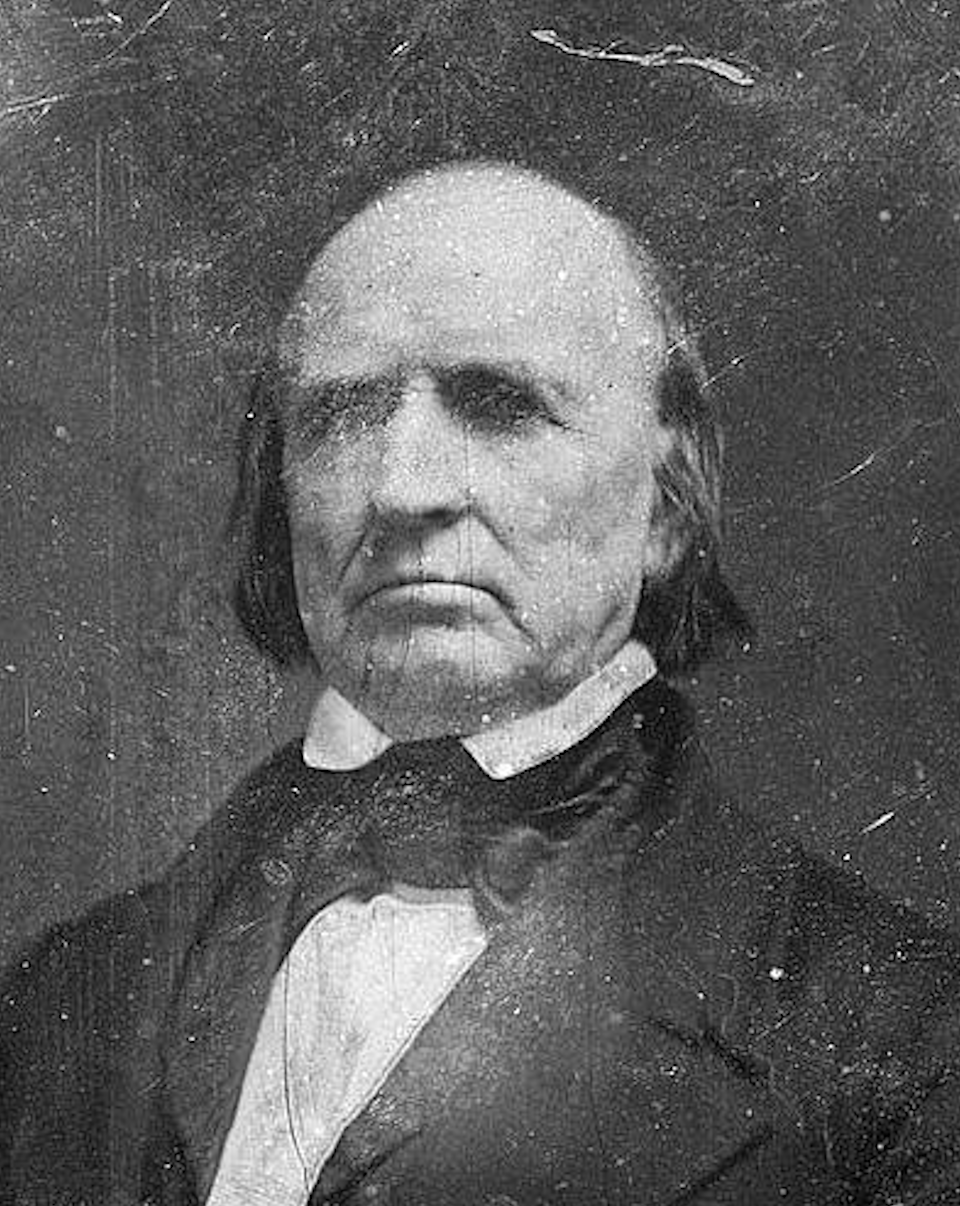
Associate Justice
John McLean
of Ohio
(Temporarily Withdrawn)

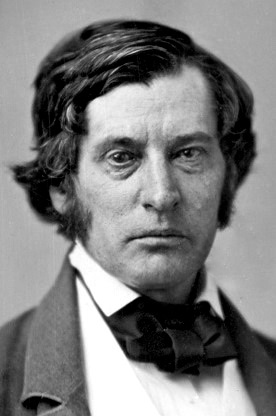
Senator
Charles Sumner
of Massachusetts
(Withdrawn)

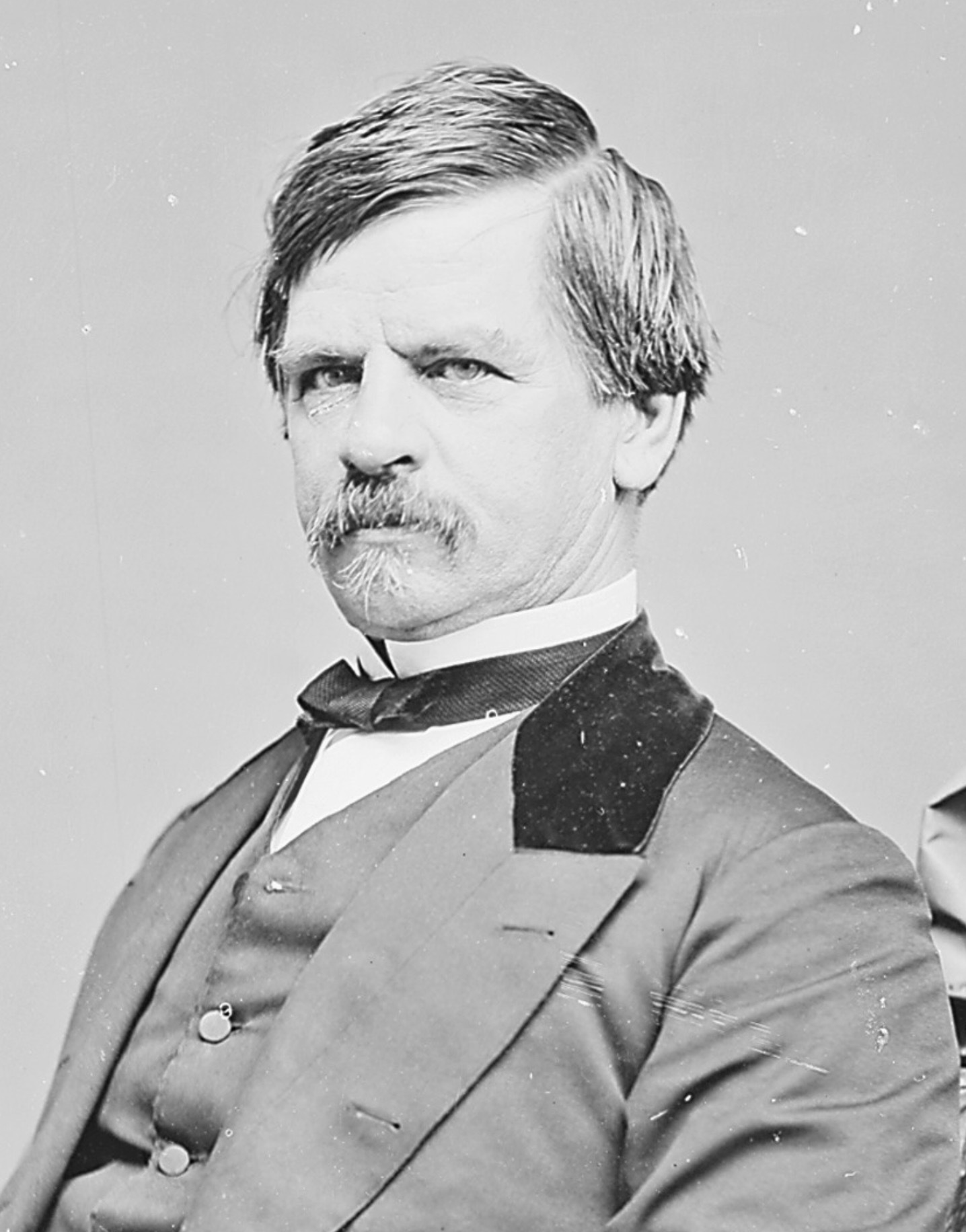
Speaker
Nathaniel P. Banks
of Massachusetts
(Withdrawn)

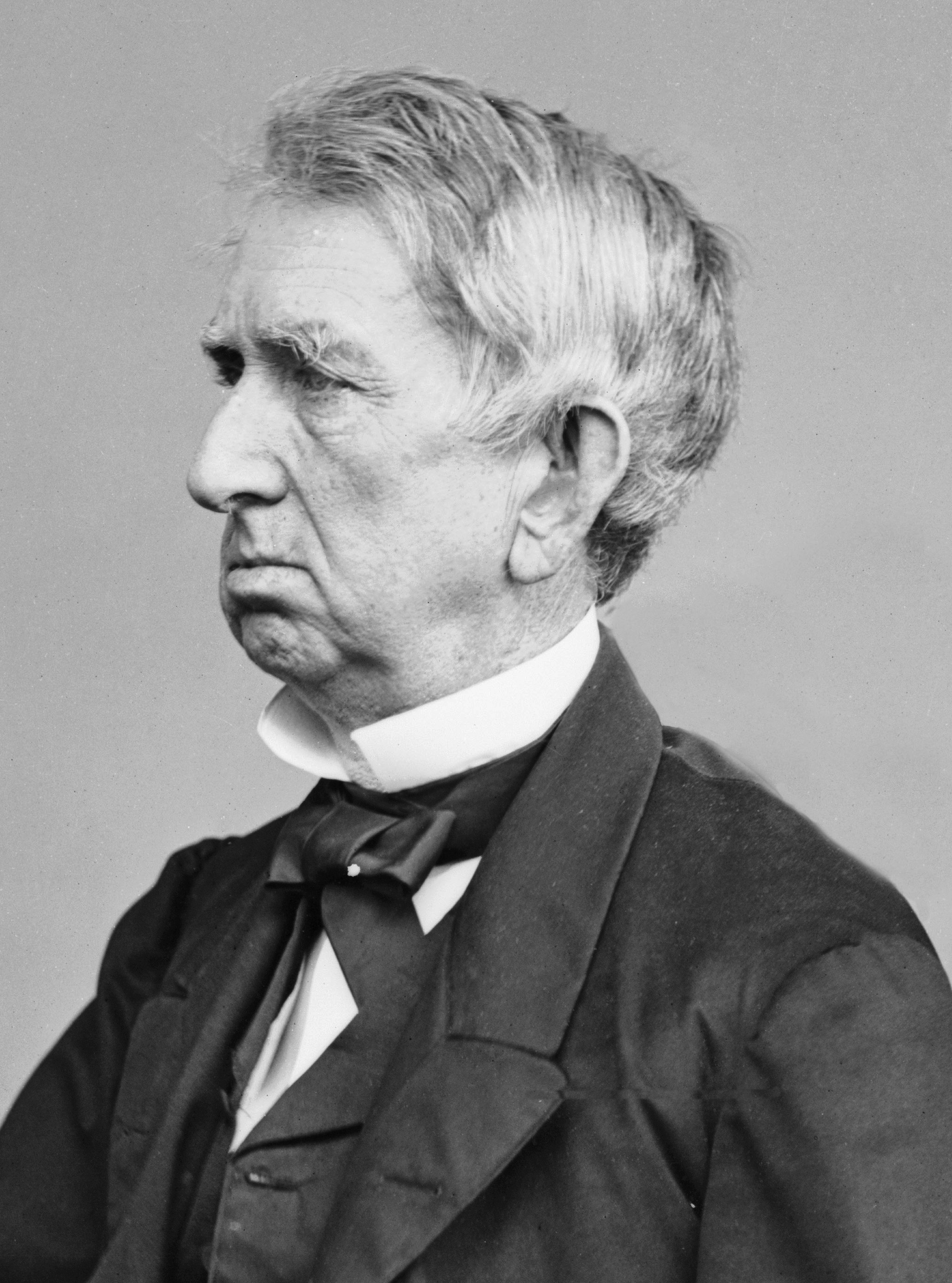
Senator
William H. Seward
of New York
(Withdrawn)

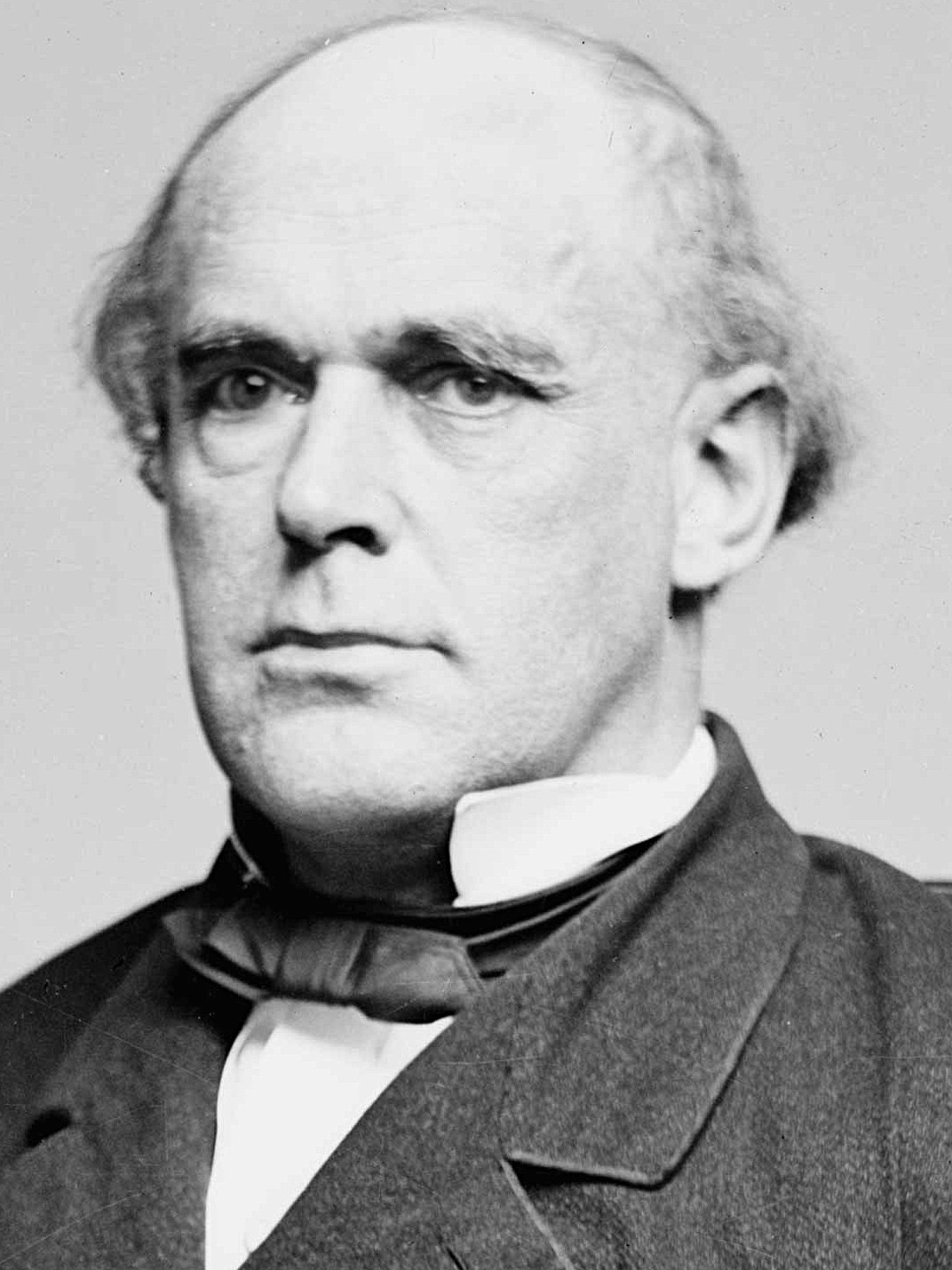
Governor
Salmon P. Chase
of Ohio
(Withdrawn)

John C. Frémont, John McLean, Nathaniel Banks, William Seward, Salmon Chase, and Charles Sumner all were considered by those at the convention, but the latter three requested that their names be withdrawn. The Massachusetts delegation resolved in a morning meeting to vote unanimously for Banks. However, the name of Banks was then authoritatively and peremptorily withdrawn and the delegation resolved as a unit to support Frémont. McLean's name was initially withdrawn by his manager Rufus Spalding, but the withdrawal was rescinded at the strong behest of the Pennsylvania delegation led by Thaddeus Stevens. Frémont was nominated for president overwhelmingly on the formal ballot.

Presidential ballot
	1st (informal)	1st (formal)
Frémont	359	520
McLean	190	37
Sumner	2	0
Banks	1	0
Seward	1	1
Not Represented	336	336
Not Voting	8	3

Presidential balloting / 2nd day of convention (June 18, 1856)

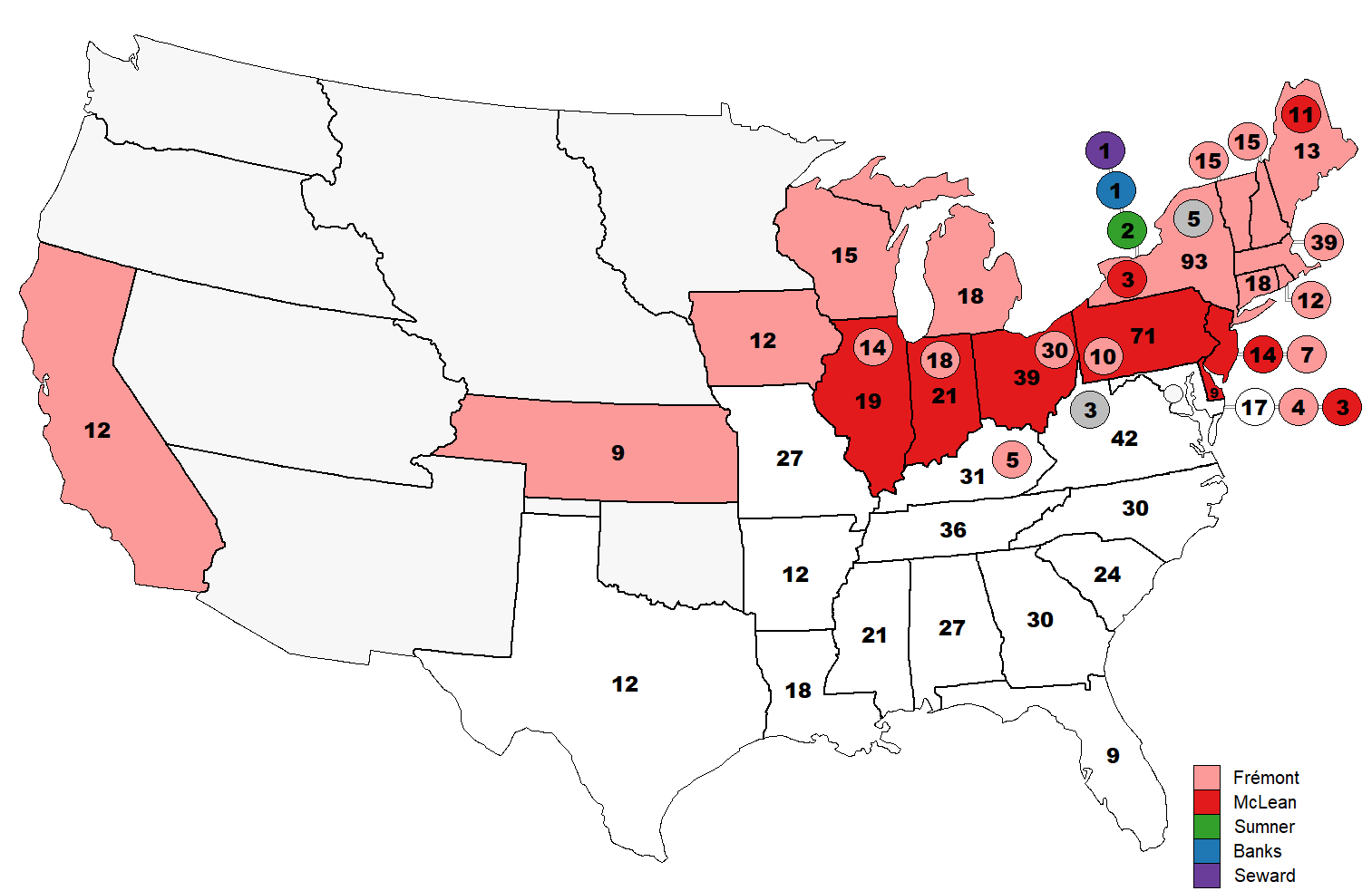
1st
presidential ballot
(informal)

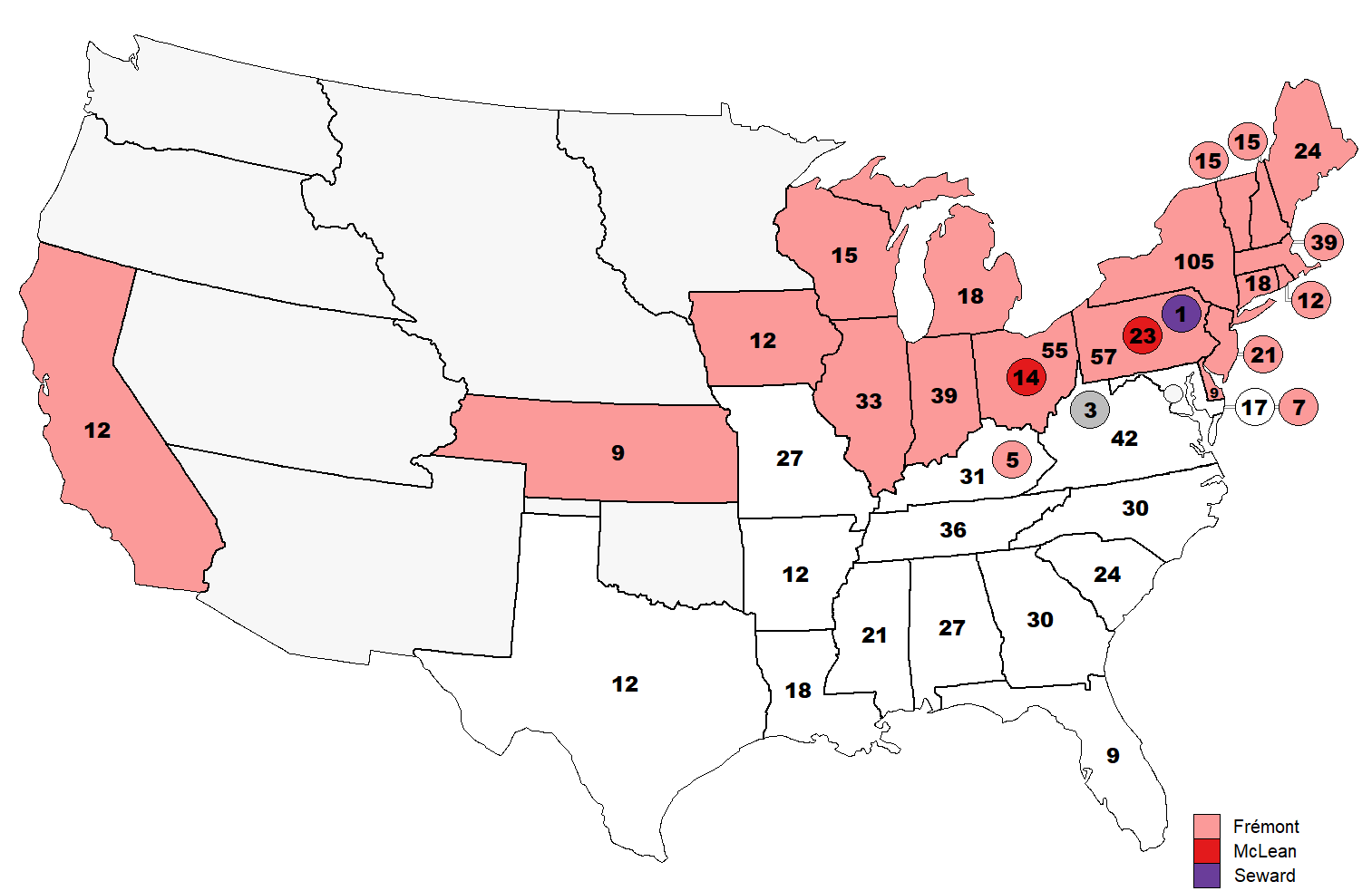
1st
presidential ballot
(formal)

== Vice-presidential nomination ==
=== Vice-presidential candidates ===
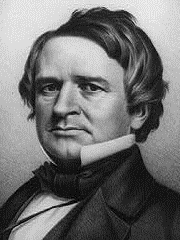
Former Senator
William L. Dayton
of New Jersey

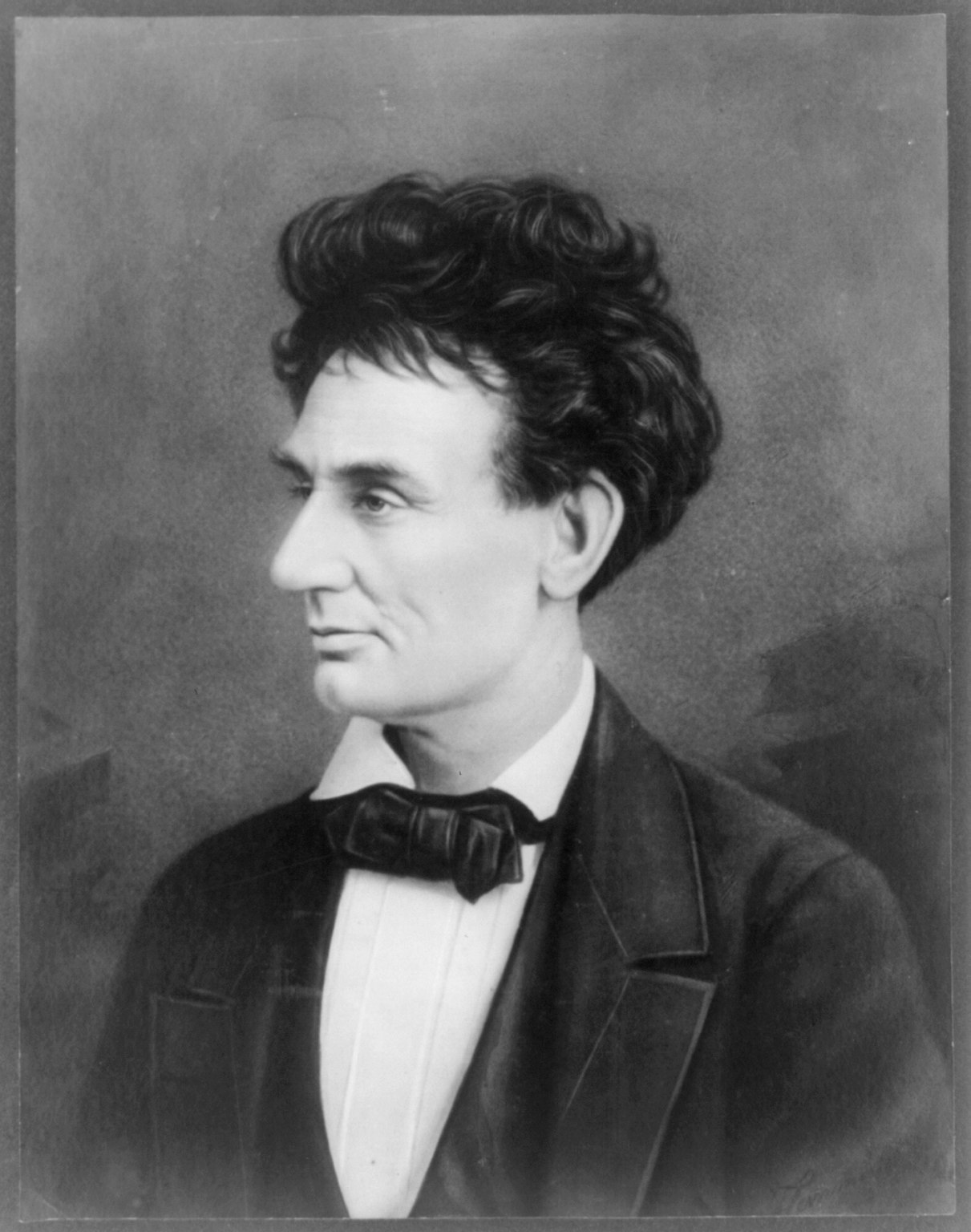
Former Representative
Abraham Lincoln
of Illinois

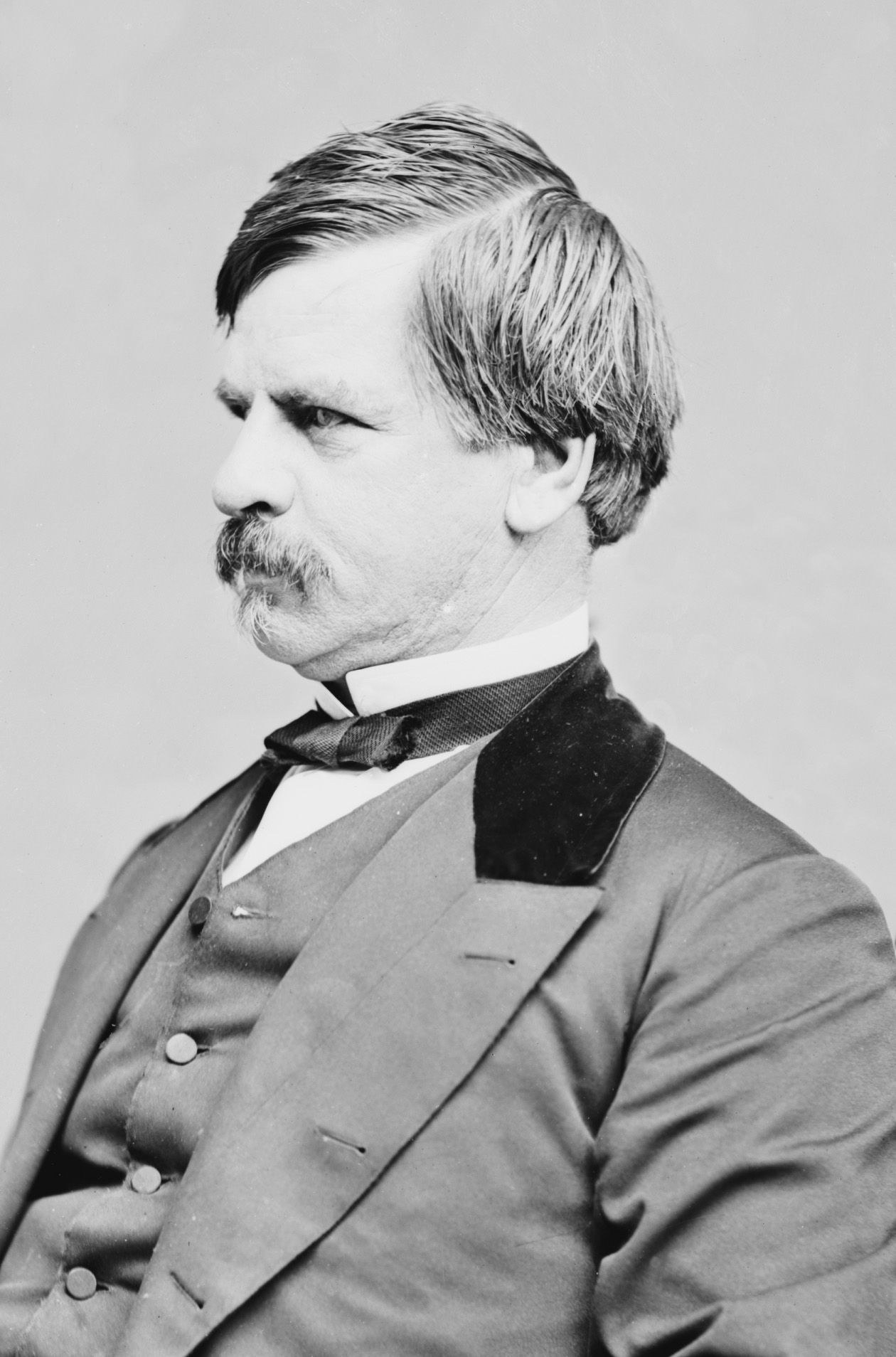
Speaker
Nathaniel P. Banks
of Massachusetts
(not nominated – declined)

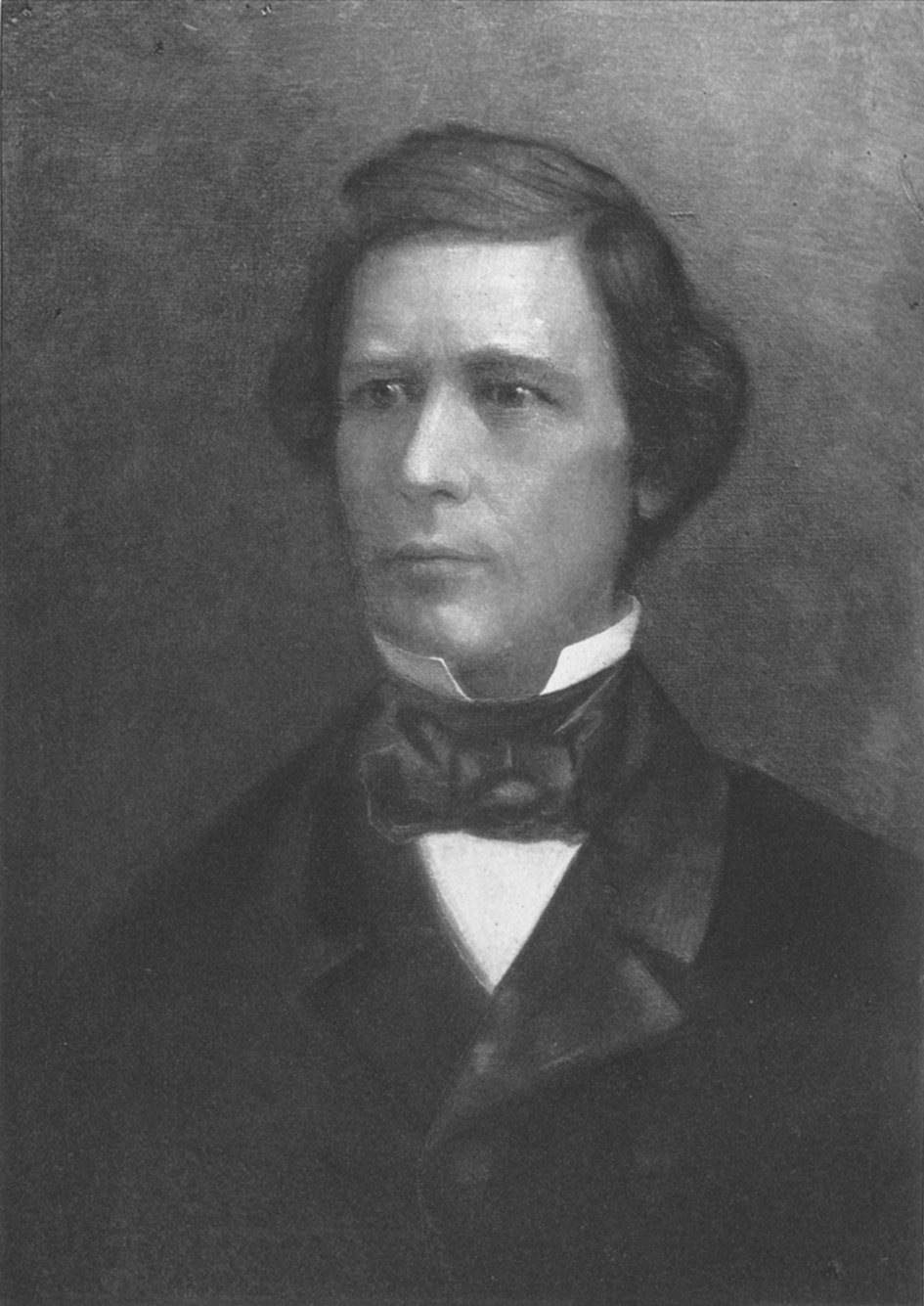
Former Representative
David Wilmot
of Pennsylvania
(declined – withdrawn)

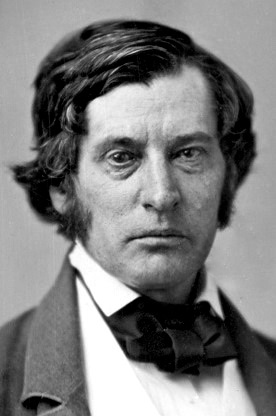
Senator
Charles Sumner
of Massachusetts
(not nominated – declined)

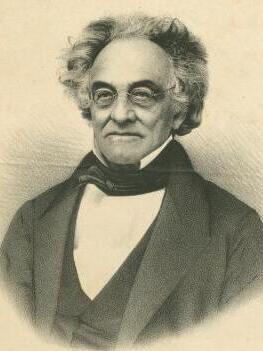
Former Representative
John A. King
of New York

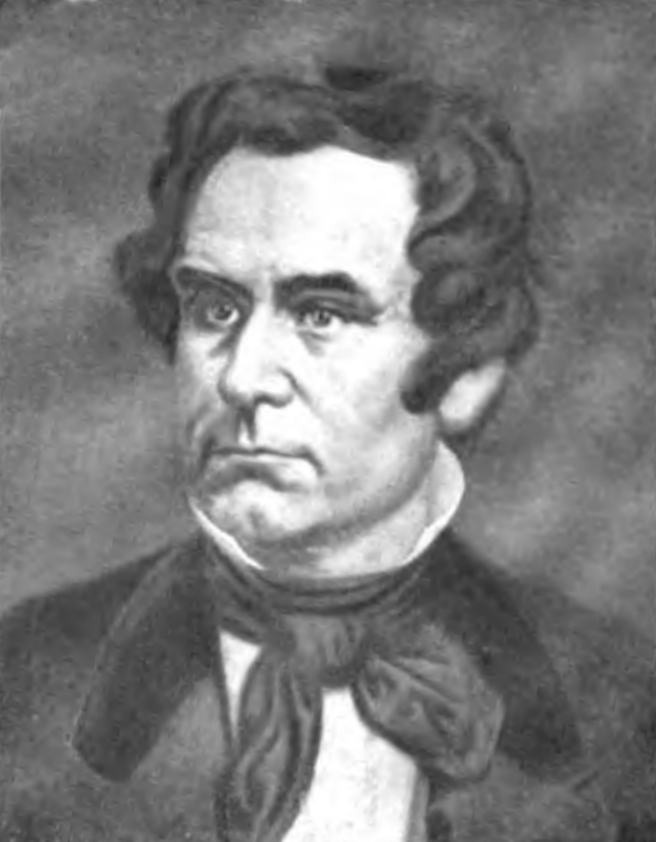
Lieutenant Governor
Thomas H. Ford
of Ohio
(not nominated – declined)

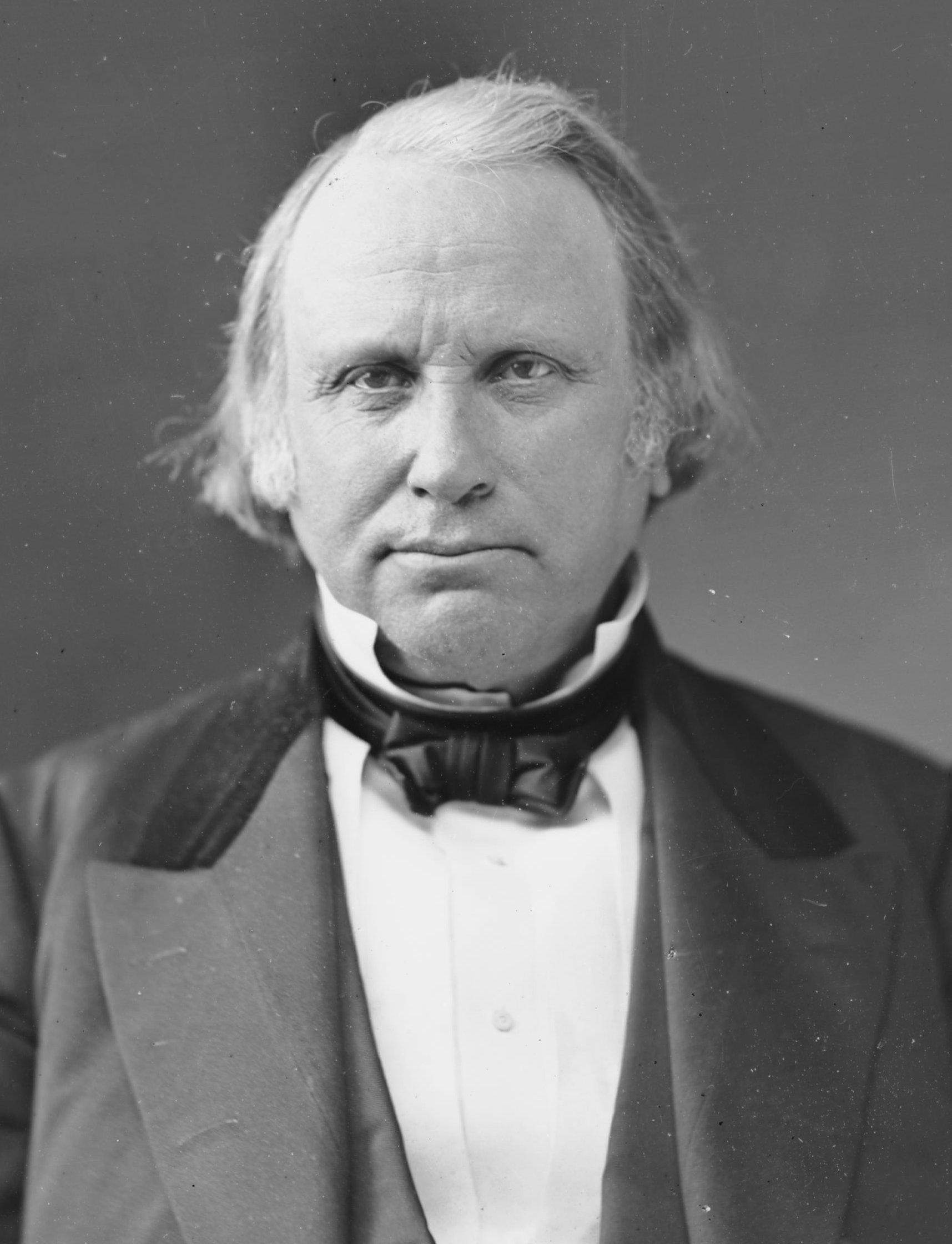
Senator
Henry Wilson
of Massachusetts
(not nominated – declined)

William L. Dayton was nominated for vice president over Abraham Lincoln.

Vice-presidential ballot
	1st (informal)	1st (formal)	Unanimous
Dayton	253	523	561
Lincoln	110	20	
Banks	46	4	
Wilmot	43	0	
Sumner	35	4	
Collamer	15	0	
King	9	1	
Pomeroy	8	0	
Ford	7	1	
Carey	3	0	
Clay	3	0	
Giddings	2	0	
Johnson	2	0	
Pennington	1	0	
Wilson	1	0	
Elder	0	1	
Not represented	336	336	336
Not voting	23	7	

Vice-presidential balloting / 3rd day of convention (June 19, 1856)

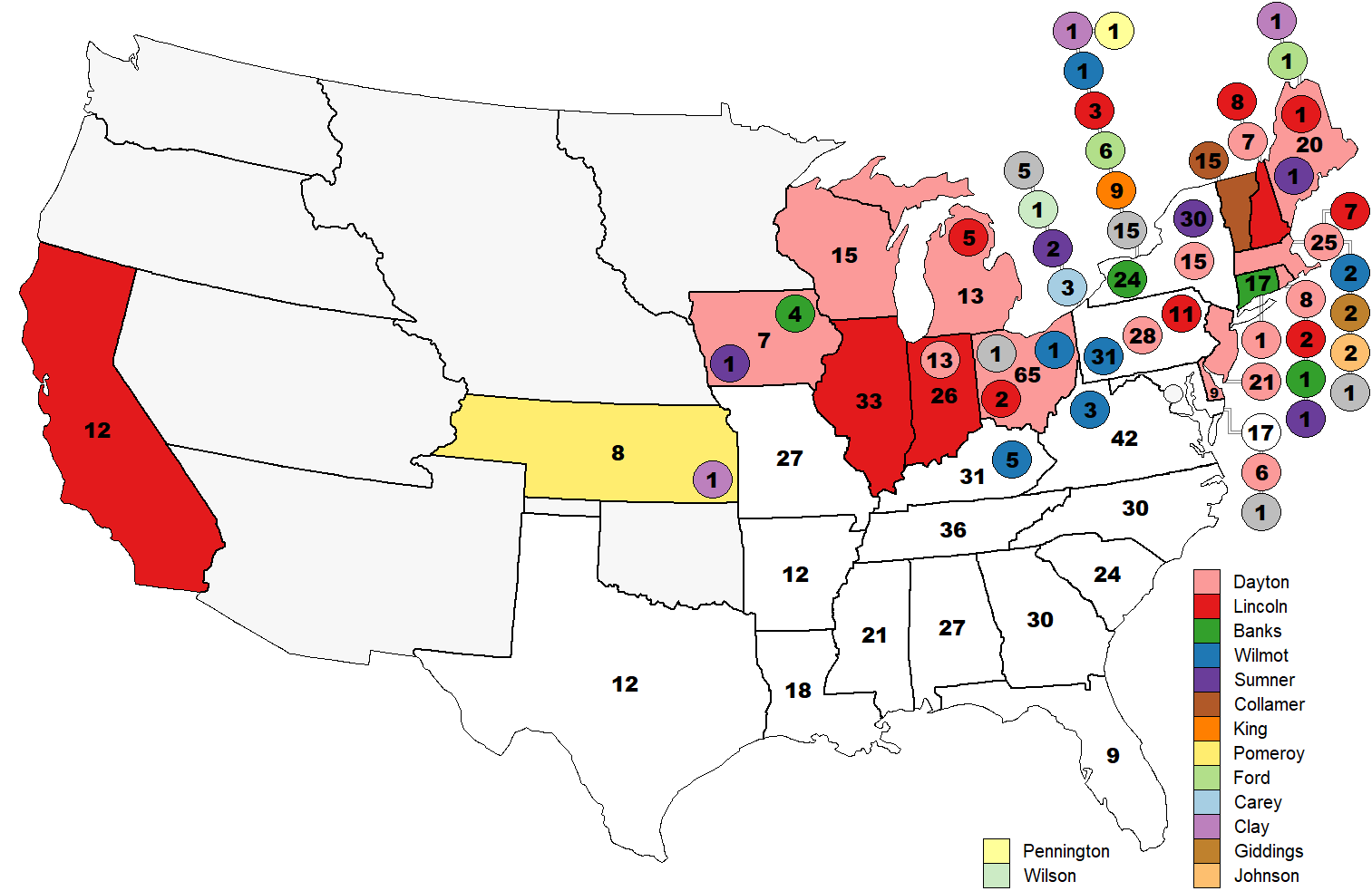
1st
vice-presidential ballot
(Informal)

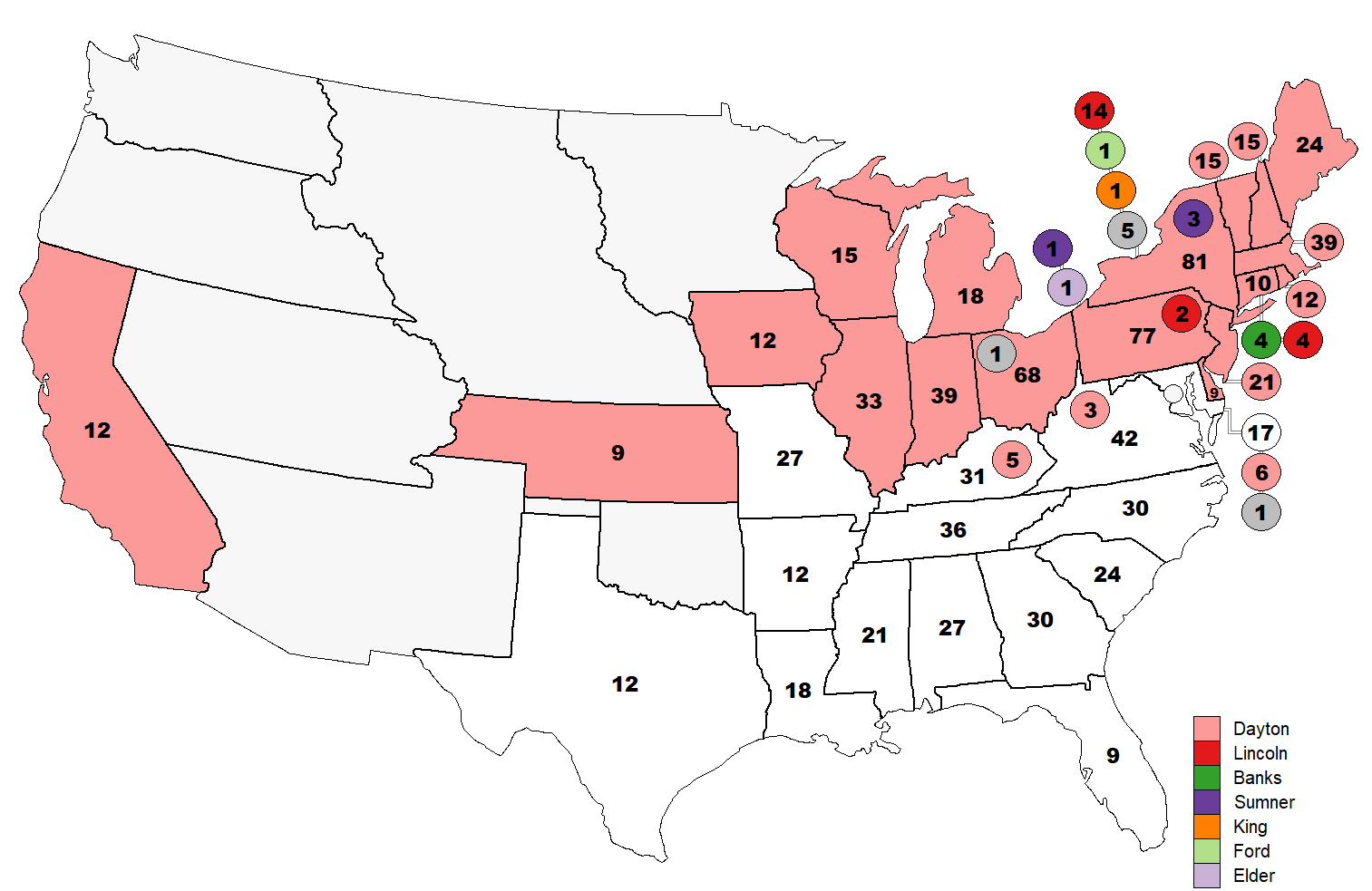
1st
vice-presidential ballot
(Formal)

== See also ==
- 1856 Democratic National Convention
- 1856 Whig National Convention
- 1856 United States presidential election
- History of the United States Republican Party
- List of Republican National Conventions
- United States presidential nominating convention

== Footnotes ==
Preceded by -	Republican National Conventions	Succeeded by 1860; Chicago
