= Edward M. Zimmerman =

American composer, choir conductor, organist, bass and music educator

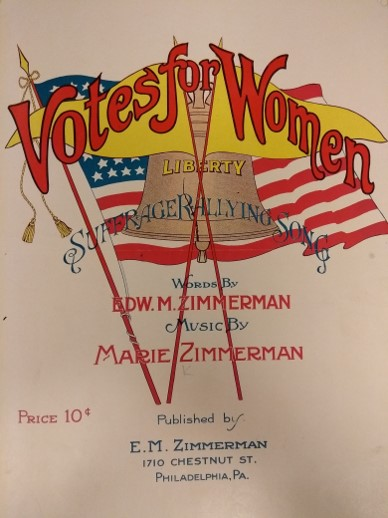
Front cover of 1915 sheet music for "Votes for Woman, Suffrage Rallying Song". From the collection of the British Library.

Edward Moore Zimmerman, often given as E. M. Zimmerman, (January 9, 1859 – December 6, 1922) was an American bass, composer, choir conductor, organist, and music educator. A longtime resident of Philadelphia, he was active as a church and concert singer in that city from the 1880s into the early years of the 20th century. He also worked as a voice teacher in Philadelphia, and held posts as a choir conductor and organist at several churches in that city. He was also a vocal music instructor at the Methodist Conference Seminary (now The Pennington School). He is best remembered as a composer of hymns, and for co-writing the suffragist anthem "Votes for Women: Suffrage Rallying Song" (1915) with his wife and frequent singing partner, the soprano Marie Kunkel Zimmerman.

== Early life and education ==
Born on January 9, 1859, in Wilmington, Delaware, Edward M. Zimmerman was the son of Henry W. Zimmerman and Catherine A. Zimmerman (née Wyatt). He attended schools in his youth in Newark, Delaware. He studied singing in London with George Henschel, and in New York City with Emilio Belari and John Howard. He began his career as a bass vocalist at the Household of Faith Church in Wilmington with an 1883 article in the Wilmington Daily Republican describing him as "a popular and well known local singer". In February 1886 he was a guest soloist in a benefit concert given to raise funds for the Delaware Society for the Prevention of Cruelty to Children.

After moving to Philadelphia, he entered the University of Pennsylvania where he studied music composition with Hugh Archibald Clarke. He also studied composition in that city with William W. Gilchrist, and appeared as a soloist in concerts with the Mendelssohn Club, a Philadelphia choir founded by Gilchrist.

== Philadelphia musician ==
=== Singer ===
By 1886 Zimmerman had moved to Philadelphia where he was a member of the Mendelssohn Male Quartet (MMQ), a professional vocal chamber group established from within the Chautauqua movement. In 1891 the MMQ was one of several ensembles that performed at a benefit concert for the Medico-Chirurgical Hospital at the Academy of Music.

Zimmerman was also active a church soloist in Philadelphia, and as early as 1887 held a post as bass soloist at Fifth Baptist Church. He later held similar posts at St. Andrew's Protestant Episcopal Church and the First Universalist Church.

In 1887 Zimmerman was the bass soloist in Jackson of Exeter's cantata The Year presented by the Vesper Choral Society of Philadelphia at Musical Fund Hall under conductor and composer H. H. Pendleton. In May 1887 he sang the role of Ahasuerus, King of Persia, in William Batchelder Bradbury's cantata Esther, the Beautiful Queen in performances given first at Saint Paul's Methodist Episcopal Church; later being presented in a two-week engagement at the Grand Opera House in Wilmington. That same month he starred as Captain Corcoran in a production of Gilbert and Sullivan's H.M.S. Pinafore at the Academy of Music. In 1894 he was the bass soloist in the world premiere of the cantata The Pilgrim by English-born American composer Albert W. Borst (1841–1923).

=== A collaborative marriage in song ===
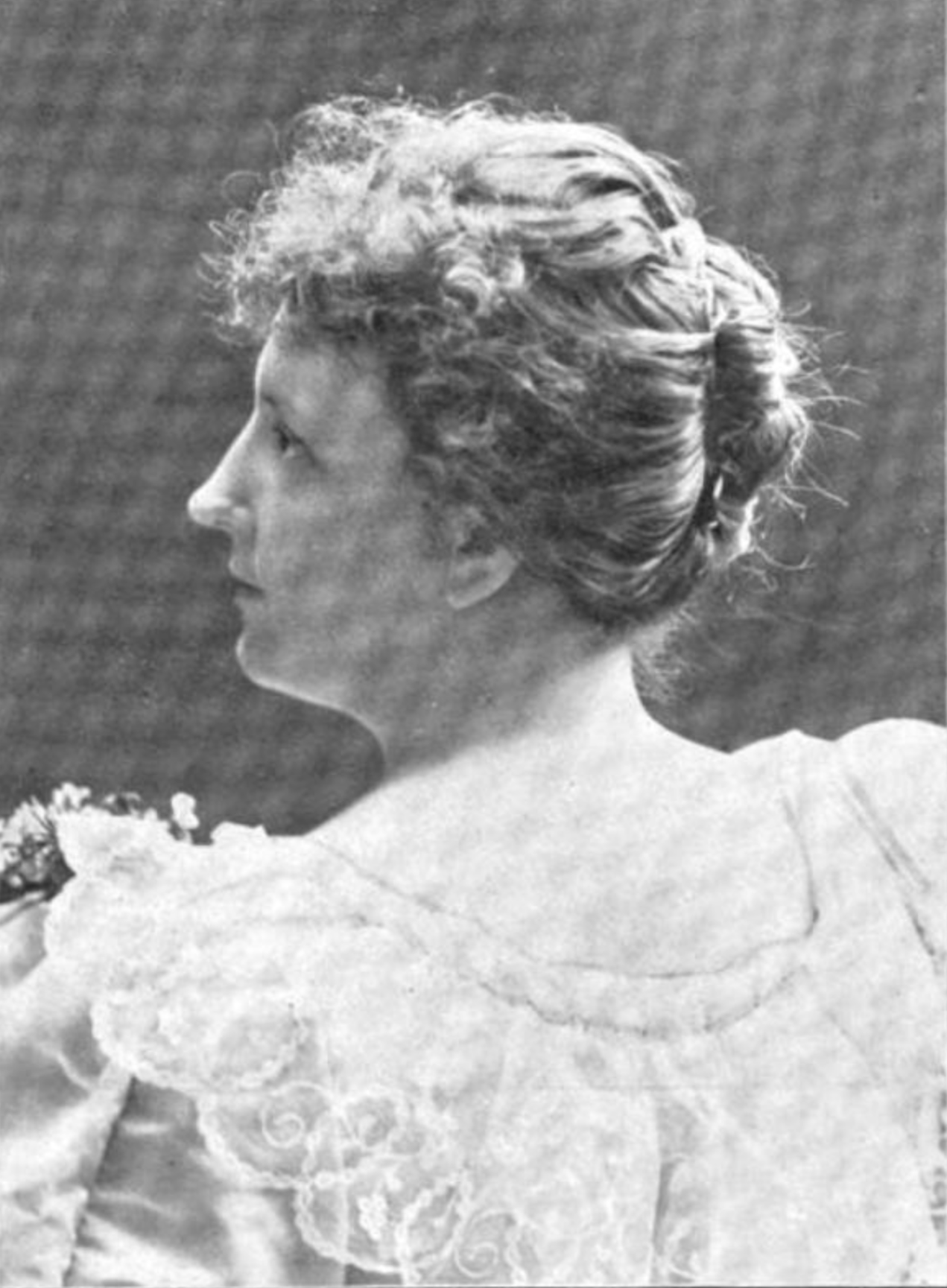
Marie Kunkel Zimmerman

In 1892 Zimmerman married the soprano and voice teacher Marie Kunkel Zimmerman. Marie, born with the name Mamie Kunkel, was the daughter of actress Ada Proctor and theatre manager, minstrel show performer, and songwriter George Kunkel Sr. (1823–1885). Her brother was George Kunkel Jr. (1866–1937); a silent film actor and opera singer.

Zimmerman would frequently sing in concerts with his wife, both before and after their marriage. In 1889 they were both featured vocal soloists in a concert given at the Music Teachers National Association's convention at Musical Fund Hall. The couple were part of a vocal quartet which performed in chamber music concerts sponsored by the Manuscript Music Society of Philadelphia at Musical Fund Hall in 1895 and 1897.

In February 1896 the Zimmermans were soloists in Louis Spohr's God, Thou Art Great: Opus 98: a Sacred Cantata for Four Voices which was performed at the Drexel Institute (now Drexel University) in a memorial concert for the Philadelphia concert pianist and music teacher Charles H. Jarvis (1837–1895). The following April they were the bass and soprano soloists in Joseph Haydn's The Creation at Philadelphia's Association Hall, a work they repeated at that same theatre in May 1898. In October 1898 the couple were part of the soloist quartet in the Philadelphia premiere of Liza Lehmann's song-cycle In a Persian garden at Witherspoon Hall.

=== Composer, choirmaster, organist, educator ===
Zimmerman held posts as choirmaster at several different Philadelphia area churches during his career, among them the Church of St. Luke and The Epiphany, Memorial Baptist Church, and Calvary Protestant Episcopal Church in Germantown. He also held the post of organist at the latter church.

With his wife, Zimmerman composed the song "Votes for Women: Suffrage Rallying Song" (1915) which was dedicated to Anna Howard Shaw, President of the National American Woman Suffrage Association. He composed the hymns "All Things Beautiful and Fair" and "Blessed Jesus, ere we part". His choral works "Jubilate" and "Nunc Dimmitis" were performed in a concert sponsored by the Manuscript Music Society in March 1895.

Zimmerman worked as a voice teacher in Philadelphia. He also taught vocal music at The Pennington School (then known as the Methodist Conference Seminary). He served terms on the executive board of the Pennsylvania Music Teachers Association.

== Death ==
Zimmerman died of Bright's disease on December 6, 1922, at Jewish Hospital in Philadelphia.
