= John Chester Backus =

American Presbyterian minister (1810–1884)

John Chester Backus (September 3, 1810 – April 8, 1884) was an American Presbyterian minister. He was pastor of the First Presbyterian Church of Baltimore for 39 years, and continued as pastor emeritus for another 9 years until his death.

== Early life and education ==
Backus, son of Eleazer F. Backus, a retired wholesale bookseller, of Albany, N. Y., and of Elizabeth, daughter of Col. John Chester, of Wethersfield, Conn., was born in Wethersfield, September 3, 1810.

He entered Columbia College in 1826, and removed to Yale College the latter part of Sophomore year, where he graduated in 1830. He studied law for one year at Yale Law School, but under convictions of duty then joined the Yale Divinity School, where he remained for part of a year. He also studied for part of a year at the Andover Theological Seminary, and afterwards removed to Princeton Seminary, where he took the full three years' course.

== Career ==
In December, 1835, while employed as Assistant Secretary of the Board of Domestic Missions of the Presbyterian Church, he was ordained as an evangelist by the Presbytery of New Brunswick; and on April 11, 1836, he was called to the pastorate of the 1st Presbyterian Church in Baltimore, Md. He accepted the call, and was installed September 15, 1836, and in this charge he continued until his death, although relieved in 1875 at his own request from active duty.

In 1848 he received the degree of Doctor of Divinity from Hanover College, Indiana; and in 1875 that of Doctor of Laws from the College of New Jersey, of which he was a Trustee from 1860 to 1872. In 1861 he was the Moderator of the General Assembly of the Presbytenan Church (Old School).

== Personal life and death ==
He married, June 2, 1840, Letitia C. Cooper, daughter of John C. Smith, of Philadelphia. He died at his residence in Baltimore, after a few weeks' illness, April 8, 1884, in his 74th year. His wife survived him with one daughter.
