= Musical Fund Hall =

- U.S. National Register of Historic Places
- Former U.S. National Historic Landmark
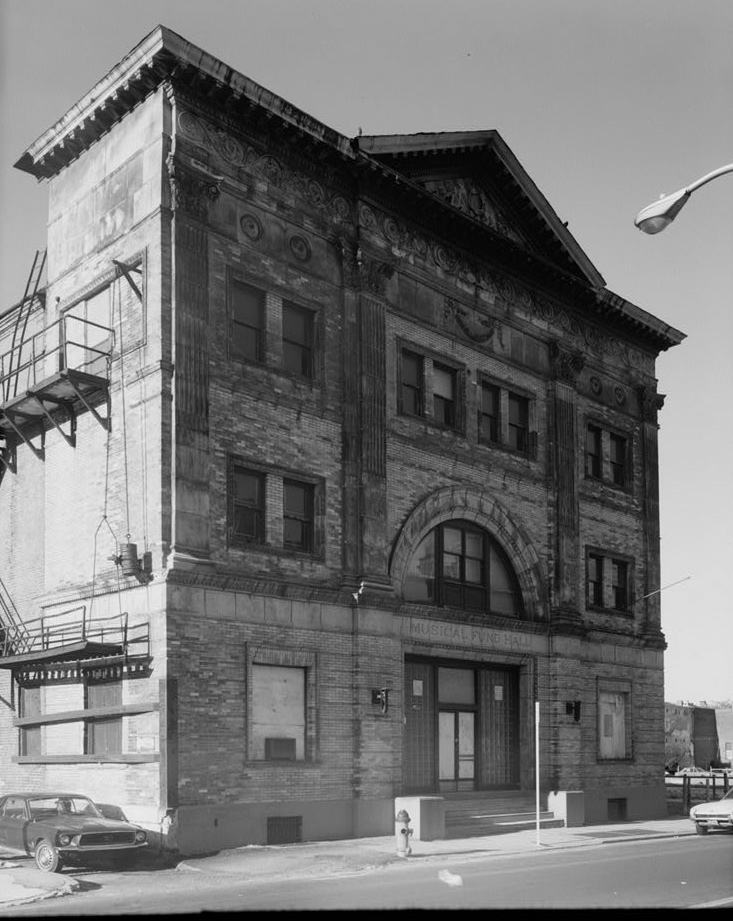
- Musical Fund Hall in 1976

- Location within Philadelphia Location within Pennsylvania Location within the United States
- Location: 808 Locust Street, Philadelphia, Pennsylvania, U.S.
- Coordinates: 39°56′49″N 75°9′18.3″W
- Built: 1824
- Architect: Multiple
- NRHP reference No.: 71000730

Significant dates
- Added to NRHP: March 11, 1971
- Designated NHL: May 30, 1974
- Delisted NHL: January 13, 1989

The Musical Fund Hall is a landmark building of both architectural and historic significance located at 808 Locust Street in Philadelphia, Pennsylvania. The hall has hosted many notable speakers and events, including the first Republican National Convention from June 17 to 19, 1856.

In 1971, in recognition of the building's historical notability, it was listed on the National Register of Historic Places. It was designated a National Historic Landmark on May 30, 1974, but withdrawn on January 13, 1989.

== History ==
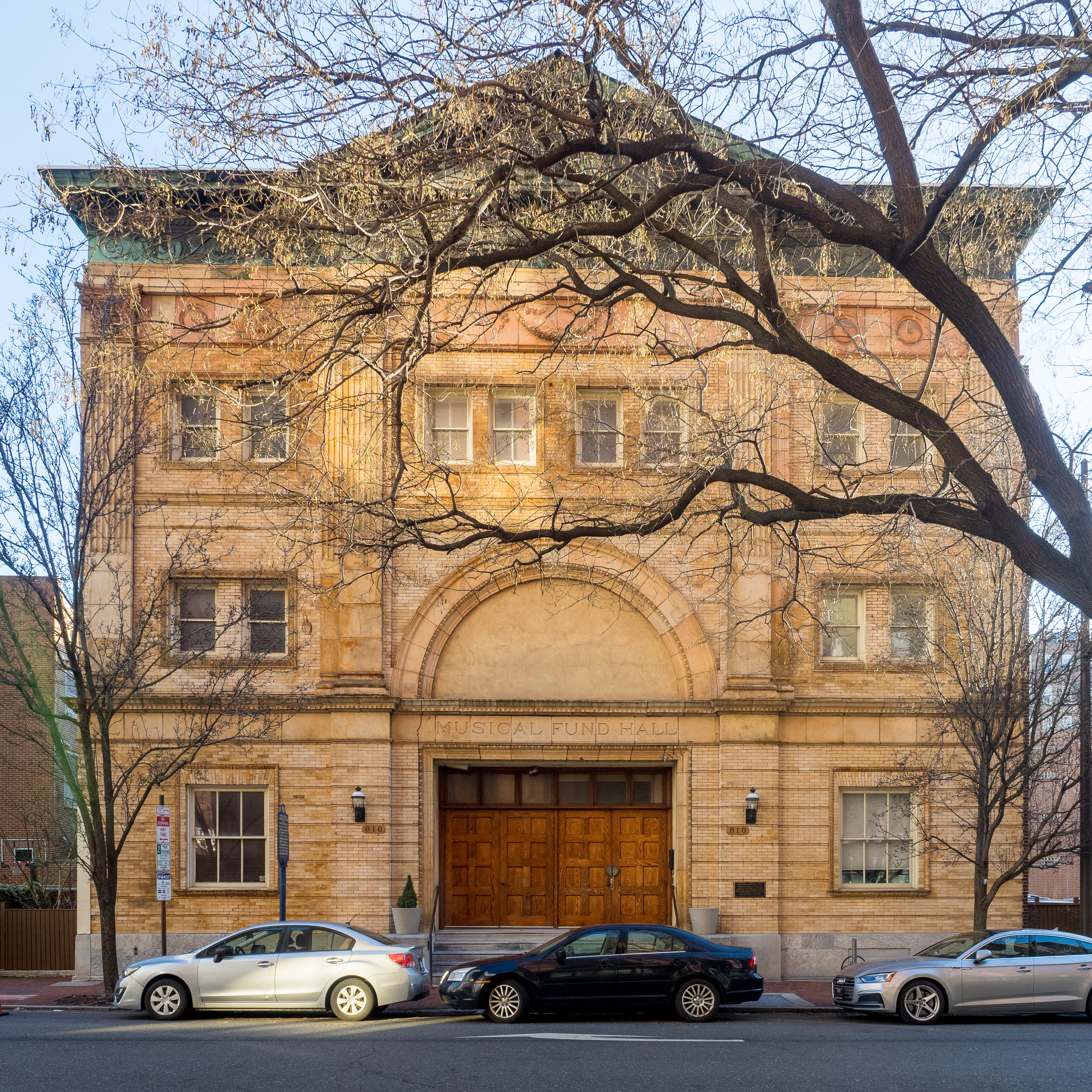
Musical Fund Hall in 2024

The building initially housed the First Presbyterian Church; it was converted into the largest musical auditorium in Philadelphia by William Strickland and opened in December 1824.

Noted for its fine acoustics, the Hall was described in a newspaper review of the first concert: "The room is exceedingly neat, and its decoration does honor to the taste of Mr. Strickland, an architect of whom Philadelphia may be justly proud. It is one hundred and six feet long, sixty feet wide, and twenty-six feet high, and is admirably calculated for the conveyance of sound..." As it continued to serve as the leading concert hall in the city, the building was renovated in 1847 by Napoleon LeBrun and expanded by architect Addison Hutton in 1891.

Internationally notable musical artists, authors, and lecturers have appeared at Musical Fund Hall, including:

- 1825: Marquis de Lafayette, who aided George Washington and the Continental Army in the American Revolutionary War, was honored at a reception
- 1827: Maria Malibran, a Spanish opera singer
- 1848: Ole Bull, Norwegian violinist
- 1842: Charles Dickens, author of A Tale of Two Cities
- 1850 and 1851: Jenny Lind, known as "the Swedish Nightingale", and Ede Reményi
- 1852: Henriette Sontag and Adelina Patti
- 1853 and 1856: William Makepeace Thackeray, lectures on the "English Humorists" (1853) and "Charity and Humor" (1856)
- 1897: poet Paul Laurence Dunbar read selections of his own works

Renowned pianists such as Louis Gottschalk, Kossowski, Sigismond Thalberg, and Wolfsohn also appeared at the Hall.

In 1856, the first National Republican Convention was held at the Musical Fund Hall. John C. Frémont was nominated on the second ballot. William L. Dayton of New Jersey was the vice-presidential nominee.

With its busy and notable schedule of events, 1856 was the banner year for the Musical Fund Hall. By the end of the year, the 3,000-seat Philadelphia Academy of Music opened and immediately supplanted the Musical Fund Hall as the premier venue for concerts and lectures in the city. The Musical Fund Society moved its concerts to the Academy of Music in 1868.

After seeing use as (among other things) a boxing arena and a tobacco warehouse, the Hall was abandoned, then was converted into condominiums. As a result of the conversion, the auditorium no longer exists. The building was removed from the list of National Historic Landmarks but it retains a position on the National Register of Historic Places.

Around 1900, the society was a main proponent in creating the Philadelphia Orchestra. In 1982, The Musical Fund Society's document collection including manuscripts of European music as well as music by Pennsylvania composers, went to the library of the University of Pennsylvania.
