= National Congress =

National Congress is a term used in the names of various political parties and legislatures.

== Political parties ==
- Ethiopia: Oromo National Congress, original name of the Oromo People's Congress
- Guyana: People's National Congress Reform
- India:
  - Indian National Congress
  - Sikkim National Congress
  - Nationalist Congress Party
- Iraq: Iraqi National Congress
- Pakistan, Bangladesh: Pakistan National Congress
- Nigeria: Ijaw National Congress
- Papua New Guinea: People's National Congress (Papua New Guinea)
- South Africa: African National Congress
- Sri Lanka: National Congress (Sri Lanka)
- Sudan:
  - National Congress Party (Sudan), an Islamist, pan-Arabist party, given the name National Congress Party c. 1988/1989
  - Sudanese Congress Party, a social-democratic party, initially created as the National Congress in 1986

== National legislatures ==
- Argentine National Congress
- National Congress of Belgium
- Brazilian National Congress
- National Congress of Chile
- National People's Congress (China)
- National Congress (Ecuador)
- Congress of the Republic of Guatemala
- National Congress of Honduras
- General National Congress (Libya)
- Congress of Paraguay
- Congress of Venezuela

== Other uses ==
- National Congress Battalions, Malta, 1798–1800
- National Congress of the Chinese Communist Party, a party congress held every five years
- National Congress of American Indians, an American indigenous rights organization
- National Congress of Australia's First Peoples, national representative body for Indigenous Australians, 2009–2019

== See also ==
- Congress (disambiguation), comparative term
- Congress of Deputies (disambiguation)
- Congress of People's Deputies (disambiguation)
- National Conference (disambiguation)
- National Congress Party (disambiguation)
- National Convention (disambiguation)
- Indian National Congress (disambiguation)
- Kamarajar Deseeya Congress, an Indian political party
