= Congress (disambiguation) =

Congress is a formal meeting of the representatives of different nations, constituent states, independent organizations (such as trade unions and political parties), or groups.

Congress may also refer to:

== National legislatures ==
- Legislature, the general term for a legislative congress

=== Modern ===
- Congress of Paraguay
- Congress of the Dominican Republic
- Congress of the French Parliament, the name of a joint sitting of the national legislature of France
- Congress of the Federated States of Micronesia
- Congress of the Philippines
  - House of Representatives of the Philippines, the branch often colloquially called "Congress"
- Congress of the Republic of Guatemala
- Congress of the Republic of Peru
- Congress of the Union, Mexico
- United States Congress, the national legislature of the United States since 1789
  - United States House of Representatives, the branch often colloquially called "Congress"

=== Former ===
- Congress of the Confederation, the national legislature of the United States 1781–1789
- Congress of the Republic (Portugal), the national legislature of Portugal 1910–1926
- Congress of the Republic of Texas, 1836–1848
- Congress of the Republic of Venezuela, 1811–1999

== Arts, entertainment, and media ==
- Congress (solitaire), a card game
- "Congress", an instrumental track on Casualties of Retail, a 2005 album by Enter the Haggis
- The Congress (1988 film), a 1988 documentary film directed by Ken Burns
- The Congress (2013 film), a 2013 action/animation film
- "The Congress" (short story), a 1971 Argentinian essay by Jorge Luis Borges

== Places ==
- Congress, Arizona, a census-designated place in Yavapai County
- Congress, Ohio, a village in Wayne County
- Congress, Saskatchewan, a hamlet in Canada
- Congress Avenue (Florida), a road in Palm Beach County
- Congress Avenue Historic District, an area of downtown Austin, Texas, along Congress Avenue

== Political groups ==
- Bangladesh Congress
- Indian National Congress, a political party in India
- Congress (A), a political party mainly active in Kerala, India until 1982
- Congress (Dolo), a 2003 political group in Arunachal Pradesh, India
- Congress (Secular), a political party in Kerala, India

== Other uses ==
- Sexual congress, sometimes just 'congress', an alternative term for the act of sex
- Congress (salamander gathering)
- Richard Congress, an Ohio politician
- USS Congress, various ships of the U.S. Navy

== See also ==
- National Congress (disambiguation)
- Congress of Deputies (disambiguation)
- Congress of People's Deputies (disambiguation)
- Congress Township (disambiguation)
