= NatCon =

NatCon may refer to:

- National conservatism, a nationalist variant of conservatism advocating traditionalist and social conservatism, particularly in Europe and the United States
  - National Conservatism Conference, conference dedicated to national conservatism, run by Yoram Hazony's Edmund Burke Foundation
- Australian National Science Fiction Convention or Natcon, an annual science fiction convention in Australia

== See also ==
- National Conference
- National Convention (disambiguation)
