= Darakhshan Andrabi =

Indian politician (born 1974)

Dr. Darakhshan Andrabi

Chairperson of the Jammu and Kashmir Waqf Board
- Incumbent
- Assumed office 16 March 2022

Minister of State (rank)
- Incumbent
- Assumed office 8 April 2022

Personal details
- Born: 1974 (age 51–52) Jammu and Kashmir, India
- Party: Bharatiya Janata Party
- Education: Guru Nanak Dev University, Amritsar
- Occupation: Politician

Syed Darakhshan Andrabi (born 1974), also written as Darakshan Andrabi, is an Indian politician from Jammu and Kashmir. She is the Chairperson of the Jammu and Kashmir Waqf Board, a position she has held since March 2022, and serves with the rank of Minister of State. She is a member of the Bharatiya Janata Party (BJP) and serves on its National Executive. She is also the first woman and the first BJP leader to head the J&K Waqf Board.

== Early life and education ==
Andrabi was born in 1974 in Jammu and Kashmir. She is the daughter of Syed Ghulam Nabi Andrabi. She earned a Doctor of Philosophy degree in Urdu language from Guru Nanak Dev University, Amritsar, in 2008.

== Political career ==
Andrabi was previously affiliated with the Socialist Democratic Party, of which she served as president, before joining the Bharatiya Janata Party.

In the 2014 Jammu and Kashmir Legislative Assembly election, she contested the Sonawar assembly constituency in Srinagar as the BJP candidate. She was defeated by Mohammad Ashraf Mir of the Jammu & Kashmir People's Democratic Party.

She served as a Member of the Central Waqf Council under the Government of India prior to her appointment to the J&K Waqf Board.

In 2021, she was appointed as a member of the BJP National Executive.

=== Chairperson of the J&K Waqf Board ===
On 16 March 2022, Andrabi was unanimously elected as Chairperson of the Jammu and Kashmir Waqf Board at its first meeting under the Central Waqf Act, 1995, held at Hajj House in Jammu. The board had been newly constituted and its members appointed by the Ministry of Minority Affairs, Government of India. She became the first woman and the first BJP leader to chair the board. She was subsequently granted the rank of Minister of State by the administration.

As Chairperson, she has overseen renovation and development projects at several religious sites managed by the Board, including works at Dargah Hazratbal in Srinagar. In September 2025, she became a central figure in a public controversy surrounding the placement of the national emblem on the inauguration plaque of the renovated Hazratbal shrine, calling for the registration of FIRs against those who objected to or damaged the plaque. Political parties including the National Conference and the Jammu & Kashmir People's Democratic Party criticised the decision, and Omar Abdullah, the Chief Minister of Jammu and Kashmir, stated that the national emblem was intended for government functions rather than religious institutions.

== Controversies ==
=== Hazratbal shrine plaque incident (2025) ===
In September 2025, the Waqf Board under Andrabi's chairmanship placed a plaque bearing the national emblem at the Hazratbal shrine in Srinagar following renovations. The move drew criticism from local political leaders and religious figures, who argued that the use of the emblem at a religious site was inappropriate. Unidentified persons subsequently broke and removed the plaque. Andrabi responded by calling for FIRs against those who had objected to or removed the emblem and characterised the act as a form of militancy. Chief Minister Omar Abdullah and former Chief Minister Mehbooba Mufti were among those who publicly criticised the placement of the emblem.
