= Bibliography of the history of the Republican Party =

These are the references for further information regarding the history of the Republican Party in the U.S. since 1854.

== Secondary sources ==
=== Surveys ===
- American National Biography (20 volumes, 1999) covers all politicians no longer alive; online at many academic libraries and at Wikipedia Library.
- Burnham, Walter Dean. Critical Elections and the Mainsprings of American Politics. (1970)
- Barone, Michael. The Almanac of American Politics 2020: The Senators, the Representatives and the Governors: Their Records and Election Results, Their States and Districts (2019); revised every two years since 1975.
- Dinkin, Robert J. (1989). Campaigning in America: A History of Election Practices. New York: Greenwood. Archived from the original on June 30, 2017 – via Questia.
- Gould, Lewis L. The Republicans : A History of the Grand Old Party (2nd ed, 2014); First edition 2003 was entitled: Grand Old Party: A History of the Republicans online 2nd edition, the best overview.
- Jensen, Richard (1983). Grass Roots Politics: Parties, Issues, and Voters, 1854–1983. ISBN 9780837163826., very well written scholarly work
- Kleppner, Paul, et al. The Evolution of American Electoral Systems (1983), applies party systems model
- Mason, Robert. The Republican Party and American Politics from Hoover to Reagan (2011) excerpt and text search
- Mayer, George H. The Republican Party, 1854–1966. 2d ed. (1967), narrative.
- Prentice, David L. "The Republican Party and US Foreign Relations" (2019) Oxford Research Encyclopedias doi:10.1093/acrefore/9780199329175.013.621
- Rutland, Robert Allen. The Republicans: From Lincoln to Bush (1996), popular
- Shafer, Byron E.; Anthony J. Badger, eds. (2001). Contesting Democracy: Substance and Structure in American Political History, 1775–2000. University Press of Kansas. ISBN 9780700611393., long essays by specialists on each time period:
  - includes: "'To One or Another of These Parties Every Man Belongs;": 1820–1865 by Joel H. Silbey; "Change and Continuity in the Party Period: 1835–1885" by Michael F. Holt; "The Transformation of American Politics: 1865–1910" by Peter H. Argersinger; "Democracy, Republicanism, and Efficiency: 1885–1930" by Richard Jensen; "The Limits of Federal Power and Social Policy: 1910–1955" by Anthony J. Badger; "The Rise of Rights and Rights Consciousness: 1930–1980" by James T. Patterson; and "Economic Growth, Issue Evolution, and Divided Government: 1955–2000" by Byron E. Shafer
- Schlesinger, Arthur Meier Jr. ed. History of American Presidential Elections, 1789–2000 (various multivolume editions, latest is 2011 with Gil troy as coeditor). For each election includes good scholarly history and selection of primary document. Essays on the most important election are reprinted in Schlesinger, The Coming to Power: Critical presidential elections in American history (1972) online editions of multivolume set

== 1854–1900 ==
- Calhoun, Charles W. From Bloody Shirt to Full Dinner Pail: The Transformation of Politics and Governance in the Gilded Age (2011) excerpt and text search
- Dearing, Mary. Veterans in Politics: The Story of the GAR (1952)
- DeSantis, Vincent P. Republicans Face the Southern Question: The New Departure Years, 1877–1897 (1959)
- Donald, David. Lincoln (1999)
- Edwards, Rebecca. Angels in the Machinery: Gender in American Party Politics from the Civil War to the Progressive Era (1997)
- Foner, Eric. Free Soil, Free Labor, Free Men: The Ideology of the Republican Party Before the Civil War (1970), history of ideas and ideology
- Gienapp, William E. The Origins of the Republican Party, 1852–1856 (1987), quantitative voting studies, by state
- Gienapp, William E. "Nativism and the Creation of a Republican Majority in the North Before the Civil War", Journal of American History 72 (Dec. 1985): 529–59 in JSTOR
- Hesseltine, William B. Ulysses S. Grant: Politician (1935)
- Holt, Michael F. "Review: The New Political History and the Civil War Era," Reviews in American History Vol. 13, No. 1 (Mar., 1985), pp. 60–69 in JSTOR
- Hoogenboom, Ari. Rutherford B. Hayes: Warrior and President (1995).
- Jensen, Richard. The Winning of the Midwest: Social and Political Conflict, 1888–1896 (1971)
- Jordan, David. Roscoe Conkling of New York: Voice in the Senate (1971).
- Kehl, James A. Boss Rule in the Gilded Age: Matt Quay of Pennsylvania (1981)
- Keller, Morton. Affairs of State: Public Life in Late Nineteenth Century America (1977). details on the rules of the game in politics
- Kleppner, Paul. The Third Electoral System 1853–1892: Parties, Voters, and Political Cultures (1979), analysis of voting behavior, with emphasis on region, ethnicity, religion and class.
- McKinney, Gordon B. Southern Mountain Republicans, 1865–1900: Politics and the Appalachian Community 1978.
- Marcus, Robert. Grand Old Party: Political Structure in the Gilded Age, 1880–1896 1971.
- Morgan, H. Wayne. From Hayes to McKinley; National Party Politics, 1877–1896 (1969)
- Morgan, H. Wayne. William McKinley and His America 1963.
- Muzzey, David Saville. James G. Blaine: A Political Idol of Other Days 1934.
- Nevins, Allan. Ordeal of the Union 8 vol (1947–77); highly detailed narrative of national politics and Civil War, 184865, by leading scholar
- Oakes, James. The Crooked Path to Abolition: Abraham Lincoln and the Antislavery Constitution (W.W. Norton, 2021).
- Oakes, James. Freedom National: The Destruction of Slavery in the United States, 1861–1865 (W. W. Norton, 2012)
- Paludin, Philip. A People's Contest: The Union and the Civil War, 1861–1865 1988.
- Polakoff, Keith Ian. The Politics of Inertia: The Election of 1876 and the End of Reconstruction 1973.
- Rhodes, James Ford. The History of the United States from the Compromise of 1850 8 vol (1932), narrative, 18501909
- Richardson, Heather Cox. The Greatest Nation of the Earth: Republican Economic Policies during the Civil War (1997)
- Robinson, William A. Thomas B. Reed, Parliamentarian 1930.
- Silbey, Joel H. The American Political Nation, 1838–1893 (1991)
- Shepard, Christopher. The Civil War Income Tax and the Republican Party, 1861–1872 (2010)
- Summers, Mark Wahlgren. Rum, Romanism & Rebellion: The Making of a President, 1884 (2000)
- Van Deusen, Glyndon G. Horace Greeley, Nineteenth-Century Crusader (1953)
- Welch, Richard E. George Frisbie Hoar and the Half Breed Republicans 1971.
- Williams, R. Hal. Years of Decision: American Politics in the 1890s. 1978.

== 1900–1932 ==
- Brands, H.W. Theodore Roosevelt (2001), full biography
- Brown, David S. In the Arena: Theodore Roosevelt in War, Peace, and Revolution (Simon and Schuster, 2025).
- Burner, David. Herbert Hoover: A Public Life. (1979).
- Chace, James. 1912: Wilson, Roosevelt, Taft, and Debs – The Election That Changed the Country. (2004). 323 pp.
- Coletta, Paolo Enrico. The Presidency of William Howard Taft (1973), standard survey
- Garraty, John. Henry Cabot Lodge: A Biography 1953
- Gosnell, Harold F. Boss Platt and His New York Machine: A Study of the Political Leadership of Thomas C. Platt, Theodore Roosevelt, and Others (1924)
- Gould, Lewis L. The Presidency of Theodore Roosevelt. (2nd ed. 2011)
- Gould, Lewis L. The William Howard Taft Presidency (2009)
- Gould, Lewis L. Four Hats in the Ring: The 1912 Election and the Birth of Modern American Politics (2008)
- Harbaugh, William Henry. The Life and Times of Theodore Roosevelt. (1963), full scholarly biography
- Hechler, Kenneth S. Insurgency: Personalities and Politics of the Taft Era (1940)
- Lichtman, Allan J. Prejudice and the Old Politics: The Presidential Election of 1928 (1979). quantitative study of voters
- Morris, Edmund. The Rise of Theodore Roosevelt, to 1901 (1979); vol 2: Theodore Rex covers 1901909. (2001); Colonel Roosevelt (2010), after 1909. Pulitzer prize biography.
- Mowry, George. The Era of Theodore Roosevelt and the Birth of Modern America, 1900–1912. (1954) general survey of era; online
- Miller; Karen A. J. Populist Nationalism: Republican Insurgency and American Foreign Policy Making, 1911–1925. Greenwood Press, 1999
- McCoy, Donald, Calvin Coolidge: The Quiet President (1967),
- Mowry, George E. Theodore Roosevelt and the Progressive Movement. (2001) focus on 1912.\
- O’Brien, Phillips Payson, “Herbert Hoover, Anglo-American Relations, and Republican Party Politics in the 1920s,” Diplomacy and Statecraft, 22 (no. 2, 2011), 200–218.
- Pringle, Henry F. The Life and Times of William Howard Taft: A Biography. 2 vol (1939); Pulitzer prize; the standard biography
- Pringle, Henry F. Theodore Roosevelt: A Biography (1931)
- Sherman, Richard B. The Republican Party and Black America from McKinley to Hoover 1973.
- Smith, Richard Norton. An Uncommon Man: The Triumph of Herbert Hoover, (1987) full-length scholarly biography.
- David Thelen, Robert M. La Follette and the Insurgent Spirit 1976. short interpretive biography
- Nancy C. Unger. Fighting Bob La Follette: The Righteous Reformer (2000), full scale biography

== 1932–1980 ==
- Bowen, Michael. The Roots of Modern Conservatism: Dewey, Taft, and the Battle for the Soul of the Republican Party (2011)
- Brennan, Mary C. Turning Right in the Sixties: The Conservative Capture of the GOP (1995), 1960s
- Broussard, James H. The Improbable Wendell Willkie: The Businessman Who Saved the Republican Party and His Country, and Conceived a New World Order (2020).
- Cunningham, Sean P. Cowboy Conservatism: Texas and the Rise of the Modern Right (2010)
- Dueck, Colin. Hard Line: The Republican Party and U.S. Foreign Policy since World War II (2010)
- Dallek, Matthew. The Right Moment: Ronald Reagan's First Victory and the Decisive Turning Point in American Politics. (2004). Study of 1966 election as governor.
- Firestone, Bernard J. & Alexej Ugrinsky, ed. (1992). Gerald R. Ford and the Politics of Post-Watergate America. ISBN 978-0-313-28009-2.
- Greenberg, David. Nixon's Shadow: The History of an Image (2003). Important study of how Nixon was perceived by media and scholars.
- Greene, John Robert (1992). The Limits of Power: The Nixon and Ford Administrations. Indiana University Press. ISBN 978-0-253-32637-9.
- Greene, John Robert (1995). The Presidency of Gerald R. Ford. University Press of Kansas. ISBN 978-0-7006-0639-9., the major scholarly study
- Jensen, Richard. "The Last Party System, 1932–1980," in Paul Kleppner, ed. Evolution of American Electoral Systems (1981)
- Ladd Jr., Everett Carll with Charles D. Hadley. Transformations of the American Party System: Political Coalitions from the New Deal to the 1970s 2d ed. (1978).
- Mason, Robert. Richard Nixon and the Quest for a New Majority (2004). 289 pp.
- Morris, Roger. Richard Milhous Nixon: The Rise of an American Politician (1990).
- Pach, Chester J. and Elmo Richardson. Presidency of Dwight D. Eisenhower (1991). Standard scholarly survey.
- Parmet, Herbert S. Eisenhower and the American Crusades (1972)
- Parmet, Herbert S. Richard Nixon and His America (1990).
- Patterson, James T. Mr. Republican: A Biography of Robert A. Taft (1972)
- Patterson, James. Congressional Conservatism and the New Deal: The Growth of the Conservative Coalition in Congress, 1933–39 (1967)
- Perlstein, Rick. Before the Storm: Barry Goldwater and the Unmaking of the American Consensus (2002) well written, broad account of 1964
- Perlstein, Rick. Nixonland: The Rise of a President and the Fracturing of America (2008) covers late 1960s
- Persico, Joseph E. The Imperial Rockefeller: A Biography of Nelson A. Rockefeller, 1982 (The author was a senior aide).
- Reich, Cary. The Life of Nelson A. Rockefeller: Worlds to Conquer, 1908–1958, 1996.
- Reichley, James; Conservatives in an Age of Change: The Nixon and Ford Administrations, Brookings Institution, 1981.
- Reinhard, David W. The Republican Right since 1945 (1983)
- Rosen, Elliot A. The Republican Party in the Age of Roosevelt: Sources of Anti-Government Conservatism in the United States (U. of Virginia Press, 2014) excerpt and text search
- Shelley II, Mack C. The Permanent Majority: The Conservative Coalition in the United States Congress (1983)
- Smith, Richard Norton. Thomas E. Dewey and His Times. (1982)
- Sundquist, James L. Dynamics of the Party System: Alignment and Realignment of Political Parties in the United States (1983)
- White, Theodore. The Making of the President: 1960 (1961); The Making of the President: 1964 (1965); The Making of the President 1968 (1969) classic narratives

== 1980–2016 ==
- The Almanac of American Politics (2022) details on members of Congress, and the governors: their records and election results; also state and district politics; revised every two years since 1975. details
- American National Biography (20 volumes, 1999) covers all politicians no longer alive; online at many academic libraries and at Wikipedia Library.
- Aberbach, Joel D., and Gillian Peele, eds. Crisis of Conservatism?: The Republican Party, the Conservative Movement, and American Politics After Bush (2011) excerpt and text search
- Aistrup, Joseph A. The Southern Strategy Revisited: Republican Top-Down Advancement in the South (1996)
- Black, Earl and Merle Black. The Rise of Southern Republicans (2002).
- Cadava, Geraldo. The Hispanic Republican: The Shaping of an American Political Identity, from Nixon to Trump (2020)
- Crines, Andrew S. and Sophia Hatzisavvidou, eds. Republican Orators from Eisenhower to Trump (2017).
- Crotty, William J. Winning the Presidency 2012 (Routledge, 2015).
- Dunbar, Peter, and Mike Haridopolos. The Modern Republican Party in Florida (UP of Florida, 2019).
- Ehrman, John, The Eighties: America in the Age of Reagan (2005)
- Frank, Thomas. What's the Matter with Kansas? How Conservatives Won the Heart of America (2005), criticism from the left
- Frum, David. What's Right: The New Conservative Majority and the Remaking of America (1996)
- Germond, Jack W. and Jules Witcover. Blue Smoke & Mirrors: How Reagan Won & Why Carter Lost the Election of 1980. 1981. Detailed journalism.
- Green, John Robert. The Presidency of George Bush. (2000).
- Janda, Kenneth. "The 2016 US Presidential Election: The Lesson for Conservatism." (2017). online paper
- Kabaservice, Geoffrey. Rule and Ruin: The Downfall of Moderation and the Destruction of the Republican Party, From Eisenhower to the Tea Party (2012) scholarly history excerpt and text search
- Lamis, Alexander P. ed. Southern Politics in the 1990s (1999)
- Patterson, James T. Restless Giant: The United States from Watergate to Bush vs. Gore. (2005), standard scholarly synthesis.
- Pemberton, William E. Exit with Honor: The Life and Presidency of Ronald Reagan (1998) biography by historian
- Perrin, Andrew J., et al. "Political and Cultural Dimensions of Tea Party Support, 2009–2012." Sociological Quarterly (2014) 55#4 pp: 625–652. online
- Philpot, Tasha. Race, Republicans, and the Return of the Party of Lincoln (U of Michigan Press, 2009).
- Reeves, Richard. President Reagan: The Triumph of Imagination (2005) detailed analysis by historian
- Sabato, Larry J. Divided States of America: The Slash and Burn Politics of the 2004 Presidential Election (2005).
- Sabato, Larry J. and Bruce Larson. The Party's Just Begun: Shaping Political Parties for America's Future (2001).
- Shafer, Byron and Richard Johnston. The End of Southern Exceptionalism (2006), uses statistical election data & polls to argue GOP growth was primarily a response to economic change
- Mel Steely. The Gentleman from Georgia: The Biography of Newt Gingrich Mercer University Press, 2000. ISBN 0-86554-671-1.
- Wooldridge, Adrian and John Micklethwait. The Right Nation: Conservative Power in America sophisticated study by two British journalists (2004).

== Recent years ==
- Alberta, Tim. American Carnage: On the Front Lines of the Republican Civil War and the Rise of President Trump (2019). ISBN 9780062896445.
- Baker, Joseph O., and Christopher D. Bader. "Xenophobia, Partisanship, and Support for Donald Trump and the Republican Party." Race and Social Problems 14.1 (2022): 69–83.
- Barber, Michael, and Jeremy C. Pope. "Does party trump ideology? Disentangling party and ideology in America." American Political Science Review 113.1 (2019): 38–54 online.
- Barrett, Marsha. Nelson Rockefeller's Dilemma (2024).
- Boot, Max. Reagan (2024).
- Boucher, Jean-Christophe, and Cameron G. Thies. "'I Am a Tariff Man': The Power of Populist Foreign Policy Rhetoric under President Trump." Journal of Politics 81.2 (2019): 712–722 online.
- Chaturvedi, Neilan S., and Chris Haynes. "Polls and Elections: Is Loyalty a Powerful Thing? Republican Senate Campaign Strategy and Trump Coattails in the 2016 Election." Presidential Studies Quarterly 49.2 (2019): 432–448 online.
- Cronin, Christopher. "Endless Love: Evangelical Voters, the Republican Party, and Donald Trump." in The 2020 Presidential Election: Key Issues and Regional Dynamics (2022): 113–129.
- Dodson, Kyle, and Clem Brooks. "All by Himself? Trump, Isolationism, and the American Electorate." Sociological Quarterly 63.4 (2022): 780–803. on foreign policy; doi:10.1080/00380253.2021.1966348
- Eichengreen, Barry. The Populist Temptation: Economic Grievance and Political Reaction in the Modern Era (2018). ISBN 9780190866280.
  - Sonin, Konstantin. "The Historical Perspective on the Donald Trump Puzzle: A Review of Barry Eichengreen's The Populist Temptation: Economic Grievance and Political Reaction in the Modern Era." Journal of Economic Literature 60.3 (2022): 1029–38. online
- Espinoza, Michael. "Donald Trump's impact on the Republican Party." in The Trump Administration (Routledge, 2022) pp. 134–150. online
- Hopkins, David A. "How trump Changed the Republican Party – and the Democrats, too." in The Trump Effect: Disruption and Its Consequences in US Politics and Government (2022): 21+ online.
- Jacobs, Lawrence R. Democracy Under Fire: Donald Trump and the Breaking of American History (Oxford University Press, 2022) online.
- Jacobson, Gary C. "The Dimensions, Origins, and Consequences of Belief in Donald Trump’s Big Lie." Political Science Quarterly 138.2 (2023): 133–166. doi:10.1093/psquar/qqac030
- Kelly, Casey Ryan. "Donald J. Trump and the rhetoric of ressentiment." Quarterly Journal of Speech 106.1 (2020): 2–24 online.
- Knoester, Chris, and Matthew Knoester. "Social structure, culture, and the allure of Donald Trump in 2016." New Political Science 45.1 (2023): 33–57. online
- Krasner, Michael Alan. "Tweets, Taunts, Tirades, and Tantrums: How America’s Donald Trump Transformed Transgressive Language into Political Power." in Debasing Political Rhetoric: Dissing Opponents, Journalists, and Minorities in Populist Leadership Communication (Springer Nature Singapore, 2023) pp. 201–218 online
- Margolis, Michele F. "Who wants to make America great again? Understanding evangelical support for Donald Trump." Politics and Religion 13.1 (2020): 89–118 online.
- Martin, Jonathan, and Alexander Burns. This Will Not Pass: Trump, Biden, and the Battle for America's Future (Simon and Schuster, 2023) online.
- Meeks, Lindsey. "Defining the Enemy: How Donald Trump Frames the News Media." Journalism & Mass Communication Quarterly 97.1 (2020): 211–234.
- Milbank, Dana. The Destructionists: The Twenty-Five Year Crack-Up of the Republican Party (2022) excerpt
- Peters, Jeremy W. (2022). Insurgency: How Republicans Lost Their Party and Got Everything They Ever Wanted. New York: Crown. ISBN 9780525576587. OCLC 1280406355.
- Piazza, James, and Natalia Van Doren. "it’s about hate: approval of Donald Trump, racism, xenophobia and support for political violence." American Politics Research 51.3 (2023): 299–314. online
- Sisco, Tauna S. et al. eds. The Unforeseen Impacts of the 2018 US Midterms (2020). ISBN 9783030379391.
- Tucker, Patrick D., et al. "Pathways to Trump: Republican voters in 2016." Electoral Studies 61 (2019): 102035.
- White, John Kenneth. "Donald Trump, the Republican Party, and the Scourge of Populism". In Populist Nationalism in Europe and the Americas ed. by Fernando López-Alves and Diane E. Johnson. (2018): 188–205.
- White, John Kenneth. "Donald Trump and the Republican Party: The Making of a Faustian Bargain". Studies in Media and Communication 5.2 (2017): 8–20.
- Wilson, Joshua C. "Striving to Rollback or Protect Roe: State Legislation and the Trump-Era Politics of Abortion." Publius: The Journal of Federalism 50.3 (2020): 370–397.

== Primary sources ==
- Cantril, Hadley and Mildred Strunk, eds. Public Opinion, 1935–1946 (1951), compilation of public opinion polls from the United States and elsewhere.
- Schlesinger, Arthur Meier Jr. ed. History of American Presidential Elections, 1789–2000 (various multivolume editions, latest is 2001). For each election includes brief history and selection of primary documents.
- The national committees of major parties published a "campaign textbook" every presidential election from about 1856 to about 1932. They were designed for speakers and are jammed with statistics, speeches, summaries of legislation, and documents, with plenty of argumentation. Only large academic libraries have them, but some are online.
  - Democratic National Committee. The Campaign Text Book: Why the People Want a Change. The Republican Party Reviewed... (1876)
  - Campaign Text Book of the National Democratic Party (1896) by Democratic Party (U.S.) National committee this is the Gold Democrats handbook; it strongly opposed Bryan
  - The Republican Campaign Text Book for 1882 by Republican Congressional Committee
  - The Republican Campaign Text Book for 1884
  - The Republican Campaign Text Book for 1888
  - Republican Campaign Text Book, 1894
