= Indian National Congress (disambiguation) =

Indian National Congress is a political party in India.

Indian National Congress may also refer to its splinter groups:

- Indian National Congress (Jagjivan), 1981–1986, led by Jagjivan Ram
- Indian National Congress (Organisation) or Syndicate/Old Congress, 1969–1977, led by K. Kamaraj
- Indian National Congress (Requisitionists) or New Congress, 1969–1970s, led by Indira Gandhi
- Indian National Congress (Sheikh Hassan), formed 2002, led by Sheikh Hassan Haroon
- Indian National Congress (U) later Indian Congress (Socialist), 1978–1986, led by D. Devaraj Urs
  - Indian Congress (Socialist) – Sarat Chandra Sinha, 1984–1999, led by Sarat Chandra Sinha

== See also ==
- National Congress (disambiguation)
- Congress Party (disambiguation)
- Pradesh Congress Committee, wings of the Indian National Congress in Indian states
- Democratic Indira Congress (Karunakaran), formed 2005, led by K. Karunakaran
