= Convention =

Convention may refer to:

- Convention (norm), a custom or tradition, a standard of presentation or conduct
  - Treaty, an agreement in international law
  - Convention (political norm), uncodified legal or political tradition
  - Genre convention, a trope or customary element of a particular genre
- Convention (meeting), meeting of a (usually large) group of individuals and/or companies in a certain field who share a common interest
  - Fan convention, a gathering of fans of a particular media property or genre
    - Anime convention, centered on Japanese anime and manga
    - Comic book convention centered on comic books
    - Gaming convention, centered on role-playing games, collectible card games, miniatures wargames, board games, video games, and the like
    - Magic convention, centered on magic and the magic industry
    - Tattoo convention, a meeting and exhibition for tattoo practitioners and enthusiasts from different shops and areas, as well as anyone who wishes to see the world of tattooing up close
    - Furry convention, centered on anthropomorphic animals; fictional non-human animal creatures with human characteristics
  - Political convention, a formal gathering of people for political purposes
  - Religious convention, a group of churches that share a common liturgy and set of beliefs such as the Southern Baptist Convention.
- Trade fair
- Bridge convention, a term in the game of bridge
- Convention station, on Line 12 of the Paris Metro in the 15th arrondissement
- "The Convention" (The Office episode)
- "Convention" (Malcolm in the Middle episode)
- "Convention", a song by Julia Jacklin from the 2019 album Crushing

== See also ==
- Conference
- National Convention (disambiguation)
- "Covention", an episode of the Disney Channel animated TV series The Owl House
