= Congress Party =

Congress Party may refer to:

- Indian National Congress, a major political party in India
- Congress Party (Barbados), a minor defunct political party in Barbados
- Botswana Congress Party, a political party in Botswana
- YSR Congress Party, a regional political party in the state of Andhra Pradesh, India
- Nationalist Congress Party, a political party of India
- Congress Party for the Independence of Madagascar, a communist political party in Madagascar
- Nepali Congress, a major political party in Nepal
- Congress Party (Egypt), a political party in Egypt

== See also ==
- Indian National Congress (disambiguation)
