= Congress of Deputies (disambiguation) =

The Congress of Deputies (Spanish Congreso de los Diputados) is the lower house of Spain.

Congress of Deputies may also refer to the following legislatures :

- the Congress of Deputies a.k.a. Cortes republicanas (1931–1939), unicameral legislature of the Second Spanish Republic
- the Congress of People's Deputies of the Soviet Union (Съезд народных депутатов, Sʺezd narodnykh deputatov, 1989–1991)
- the Congress of People's Deputies of Russia (Съезд народных депутатов, Sʺezd narodnykh deputatov, 1990–1993)
- the Legislative Assembly of Costa Rica, a.k.a. Congress of Deputies
- the Congress of the Republic of Guatemala (Congreso de la República), made up of 160 Deputies (Diputados)
- the National Congress of Honduras (Congreso Nacional), made up of 128 Deputies (Diputados)

== See also ==
- Congress (disambiguation)
- Deputy (legislator)
- Congress of People's Deputies (disambiguation)
- National Congress (disambiguation)
