= List of Republican National Conventions =

States that have hosted a Republican National Convention – til 2020

This is a list of Republican National Conventions. The quadrennial convention is the presidential nominating convention of the Republican Party of the United States.

== List of Republican National Conventions ==
Note: Conventions whose nominees won the subsequent presidential election are shaded in pink.

Dates	Year	Location	State	Temporary Chair	Permanent Chair	Number of Ballots	Presidential Nominee	Vice Presidential Nominee
June 17–19	1856	Musical Fund Hall; Philadelphia, Pennsylvania	Pennsylvania	Robert Emmett of New York	Henry S. Lane of Indiana	2	John C. Frémont of California	William L. Dayton of New Jersey
May 16–18	1860	Wigwam; Chicago, Illinois	Illinois	David Wilmot of Pennsylvania	George Ashmun of Massachusetts	3	Abraham Lincoln of Illinois	Hannibal Hamlin of Maine
June 7–8	1864^{1}	Front Street Theater; Baltimore, Maryland	Maryland	Robert Breckinridge of Kentucky	William Dennison of Ohio	1	Abraham Lincoln of Illinois	Andrew Johnson of Tennessee
May 20–21	1868^{2}	Crosby's Opera House; Chicago, Illinois	Illinois	Carl Schurz of Missouri	Joseph R. Hawley of Connecticut	1	Ulysses S. Grant of Illinois	Schuyler Colfax of Indiana
June 5–6	1872^{2}	Academy of Music; Philadelphia, Pennsylvania	Pennsylvania	Morton McMichael of Pennsylvania	Thomas Settle of North Carolina	1	Ulysses S. Grant of Illinois	Henry Wilson of Massachusetts
June 14–16	1876	Exposition Hall; Cincinnati, Ohio	Ohio	Theodore M. Pomeroy of New York	Edward McPherson of Pennsylvania	7	Rutherford B. Hayes of Ohio*	William A. Wheeler of New York*
June 2–8	1880	Interstate Exposition Building; Chicago, Illinois	Illinois	George F. Hoar of Massachusetts		36	James A. Garfield of Ohio	Chester A. Arthur of New York
June 3–6	1884	Exposition Hall; Chicago, Illinois	Illinois	John R. Lynch of Mississippi	John B. Henderson of Missouri	4	James G. Blaine of Maine	John A. Logan of Illinois
June 19–25	1888	Auditorium Theatre; Chicago, Illinois	Illinois	John M. Thurston of Nebraska	Morris M. Estee of California	8	Benjamin Harrison of Ohio*	Levi P. Morton of New York*
June 7–10	1892	Industrial Exposition Building; Minneapolis, Minnesota	Minnesota	J. Sloat Fassett of New York	William McKinley of Ohio	1	Benjamin Harrison of Ohio	Whitelaw Reid of New York
June 16–18	1896	St. Louis Exposition and Music Hall; St. Louis, Missouri	Missouri	Charles W. Fairbanks of Indiana	John M. Thurston of Nebraska	1	William McKinley of Ohio	Garret Hobart of New Jersey
June 19–21	1900	Convention Hall; Philadelphia, Pennsylvania	Pennsylvania	Edward O. Wolcott of Colorado	Henry Cabot Lodge of Massachusetts	1	William McKinley of Ohio	Theodore Roosevelt of New York
June 21–23	1904	Chicago Coliseum; Chicago, Illinois	Illinois	Elihu Root of New York	Joseph G. Cannon of Illinois	1	Theodore Roosevelt of New York	Charles W. Fairbanks of Indiana
June 16–19	1908	Chicago Coliseum; Chicago, Illinois	Illinois	Julius C. Burrows of Michigan	Henry Cabot Lodge of Massachusetts	1	William Howard Taft of Ohio	James S. Sherman of New York
June 18–22	1912	Chicago Coliseum; Chicago, Illinois	Illinois	Elihu Root of New York		1	William Howard Taft of Ohio	James S. Sherman of New York^{3}
June 7–10	1916	Chicago Coliseum; Chicago, Illinois	Illinois	Warren G. Harding of Ohio		3	Charles Evans Hughes of New York	Charles W. Fairbanks of Indiana
June 8–12	1920	Chicago Coliseum; Chicago, Illinois	Illinois	Henry Cabot Lodge of Massachusetts		10	Warren G. Harding of Ohio	Calvin Coolidge of Massachusetts
June 10–12	1924	Public Auditorium; Cleveland, Ohio	Ohio	Theodore E. Burton of Ohio	Frank W. Mondell of Wyoming	1	Calvin Coolidge of Massachusetts	Charles G. Dawes of Illinois
June 12–15	1928	Convention Hall; Kansas City, Missouri	Missouri	Simeon D. Fess of Ohio	George H. Moses of New Hampshire	1	Herbert Hoover of California	Charles Curtis of Kansas
June 14–16	1932	Chicago Stadium; Chicago, Illinois	Illinois	Lester J. Dickinson of Iowa	Bertrand Snell of New York	1	Herbert Hoover of California	Charles Curtis of Kansas
June 9–12	1936	Public Auditorium; Cleveland, Ohio	Ohio	Frederick Steiwer of Oregon	Bertrand Snell of New York	1	Alf Landon of Kansas	Frank Knox of Illinois
June 24–28	1940	Convention Hall; Philadelphia, Pennsylvania	Pennsylvania	Harold Stassen of Minnesota	Joseph W. Martin of Massachusetts	6	Wendell Willkie of New York	Charles L. McNary of Oregon
June 26–28	1944	Chicago Stadium; Chicago, Illinois	Illinois	Earl Warren of California	Joseph W. Martin of Massachusetts	1	Thomas E. Dewey of New York	John W. Bricker of Ohio
June 21–25	1948	Convention Hall; Philadelphia, Pennsylvania	Pennsylvania	Dwight Green of Illinois	Joseph W. Martin of Massachusetts	3	Thomas E. Dewey of New York	Earl Warren of California
July 7–11	1952	International Amphitheatre; Chicago, Illinois	Illinois	Walter S. Hallanan of West Virginia	Joseph W. Martin of Massachusetts	1	Dwight D. Eisenhower of New York	Richard Nixon of California
August 20–23	1956	Cow Palace; Daly City, California	California	William F. Knowland of California	Joseph W. Martin of Massachusetts	1	Dwight D. Eisenhower of Pennsylvania	Richard Nixon of California
July 25–28	1960	International Amphitheatre; Chicago, Illinois	Illinois	Cecil Underwood of West Virginia	Charles Halleck of Indiana	1	Richard Nixon of California	Henry Cabot Lodge Jr. of Massachusetts
July 13–16	1964	Cow Palace; Daly City, California	California	Mark Hatfield of Oregon	Thruston Morton of Kentucky	1	Barry Goldwater of Arizona	William E. Miller of New York
August 5–8	1968	Miami Beach Convention Center; Miami Beach, Florida	Florida	Edward Brooke of Massachusetts	Gerald Ford of Michigan	1	Richard Nixon of New York	Spiro Agnew of Maryland
August 21–23	1972	Miami Beach Convention Center; Miami Beach, Florida^{4}	Florida	Ronald Reagan of California	Gerald Ford of Michigan	1	Richard Nixon of California	Spiro Agnew of Maryland
August 16–19	1976	Kemper Arena; Kansas City, Missouri	Missouri	Bob Dole of Kansas	John J. Rhodes of Arizona	1	Gerald Ford of Michigan	Bob Dole of Kansas
July 14–17	1980	Joe Louis Arena; Detroit, Michigan	Michigan	Nancy Kassebaum of Kansas	John J. Rhodes of Arizona	1	Ronald Reagan of California	George H. W. Bush of Texas
August 20–23	1984	Dallas Convention Center; Dallas, Texas	Texas	Howard Baker of Tennessee	Bob Michel of Illinois	1	Ronald Reagan of California	George H. W. Bush of Texas
August 15–18	1988	Louisiana Superdome; New Orleans, Louisiana	Louisiana	Elizabeth Dole of Kansas	Bob Michel of Illinois	1	George H. W. Bush of Texas	Dan Quayle of Indiana
August 17–20	1992	Astrodome; Houston, Texas	Texas	Kay Bailey Hutchison of Texas	Bob Michel of Illinois	1	George H. W. Bush of Texas	Dan Quayle of Indiana
August 12–15	1996	San Diego Convention Center; San Diego, California	California	George W. Bush of Texas; Christine Todd Whitman of New Jersey	Newt Gingrich of Georgia	1	Bob Dole of Kansas	Jack Kemp of Maryland
July 31–August 3	2000	First Union Center; Philadelphia, Pennsylvania	Pennsylvania	Trent Lott of Mississippi	Dennis Hastert of Illinois	1	George W. Bush of Texas*	Dick Cheney of Wyoming*
August 30–September 2	2004	Madison Square Garden; New York City, New York	New York	Linda Lingle of Hawaii	Dennis Hastert of Illinois	1	George W. Bush of Texas	Dick Cheney of Wyoming
September 1–4	2008	Xcel Energy Center; Saint Paul, Minnesota	Minnesota	Mitch McConnell of Kentucky	John Boehner of Ohio	1	John McCain of Arizona	Sarah Palin of Alaska
August 27–30	2012	Tampa Bay Times Forum; Tampa, Florida	Florida	Mitch McConnell of Kentucky	John Boehner of Ohio	1	Mitt Romney of Massachusetts	Paul Ryan of Wisconsin
July 18–21	2016	Quicken Loans Arena; Cleveland, Ohio	Ohio	Mitch McConnell of Kentucky	Paul Ryan of Wisconsin	1	Donald Trump of New York*	Mike Pence of Indiana*
August 24–27	2020	Charlotte Convention Center; Charlotte, North Carolina (Day 1); Various locations remotely (Days 2–4)^{5}	North Carolina	Mitch McConnell of Kentucky	Kevin McCarthy of California	1	Donald Trump of Florida	Mike Pence of Indiana
July 15–18	2024	Fiserv Forum; Milwaukee, Wisconsin	Wisconsin	Mitch McConnell of Kentucky	Mike Johnson of Louisiana	1	Donald Trump of Florida	JD Vance of Ohio
TBD	2028	Toyota Center; Houston, Texas	Texas	TBD	TBD	TBD	TBD	TBD

*Won the election despite losing the popular vote.
^{1}This convention was known as the National Union Convention.
^{2}This convention was known as the National Union Republican Convention.
^{3}Sherman, who had been elected vice president in 1908, died six days before the 1912 election; he was subsequently replaced as Republican vice-presidential nominee by Nicholas M. Butler of New York.
^{4}Originally scheduled for the San Diego Sports Arena in San Diego, California and for August 14–16.
^{5}Originally scheduled for the Spectrum Center in Charlotte, North Carolina, but the venue was changed due to the COVID-19 pandemic.

== Keynote speakers ==
- 1884 – U.S. Representative John R. Lynch of Mississippi (thought to be the first keynote speaker)
- 1896 – Charles W. Fairbanks of Indiana
- 1900 – U.S. Senator from Colorado Edward O. Wolcott
- 1904 – Secretary of War Elihu Root of New York
- 1908 – U.S. Senator Julius C. Burrows of Michigan
- 1912 – U.S. Senator Elihu Root of New York
- 1916 – U.S. Senator Warren G. Harding of Ohio
- 1920 – U.S. Senator Henry Cabot Lodge of Massachusetts
- 1924 – U.S. Representative Theodore Burton of Ohio
- 1928 – U.S. Senator Simeon Fess of Ohio
- 1932 – U.S. Senator Lester Dickinson of Iowa
- 1936 – U.S. Senator Frederick Steiwer of Oregon
- 1940 – Governor Harold Stassen of Minnesota
- 1944 – Governor Earl Warren of California
- 1948 – Governor Dwight Green of Illinois
- 1952 – General Douglas MacArthur of Wisconsin
- 1956 – Governor Arthur Langlie of Washington
- 1960 – U.S. Representative Walter Judd of Minnesota
- 1964 – Governor Mark Hatfield of Oregon
- 1968 – Governor Daniel Evans of Washington
- 1972 – RNC Co-Chair Anne Armstrong of Texas
- 1976 – U.S. Senator Howard Baker of Tennessee
- 1980 – U.S. Representative Guy Vander Jagt of Michigan
- 1984 – U.S. Treasurer Katherine Ortega of New Mexico
- 1988 – Governor Thomas Kean of New Jersey
- 1992 – U.S. Senator Phil Gramm of Texas
- 1996 – U.S. Representative Susan Molinari of New York
- 2000 – No officially designated keynote speaker; U.S. Senator John McCain of Arizona and General Colin Powell of Virginia were featured speakers.
- 2004 – U.S. Senator Zell Miller of Georgia (a Democrat, Miller is first speaker from the opposite party to address a national convention as keynoter)
- 2008 – Mayor Rudy Giuliani of New York
- 2012 – Governor Chris Christie of New Jersey
- 2016 – No officially designated keynote speaker; multiple "headliners" each night
- 2020 – U.S. Senator Tim Scott of South Carolina

== Gallery of convention sites ==
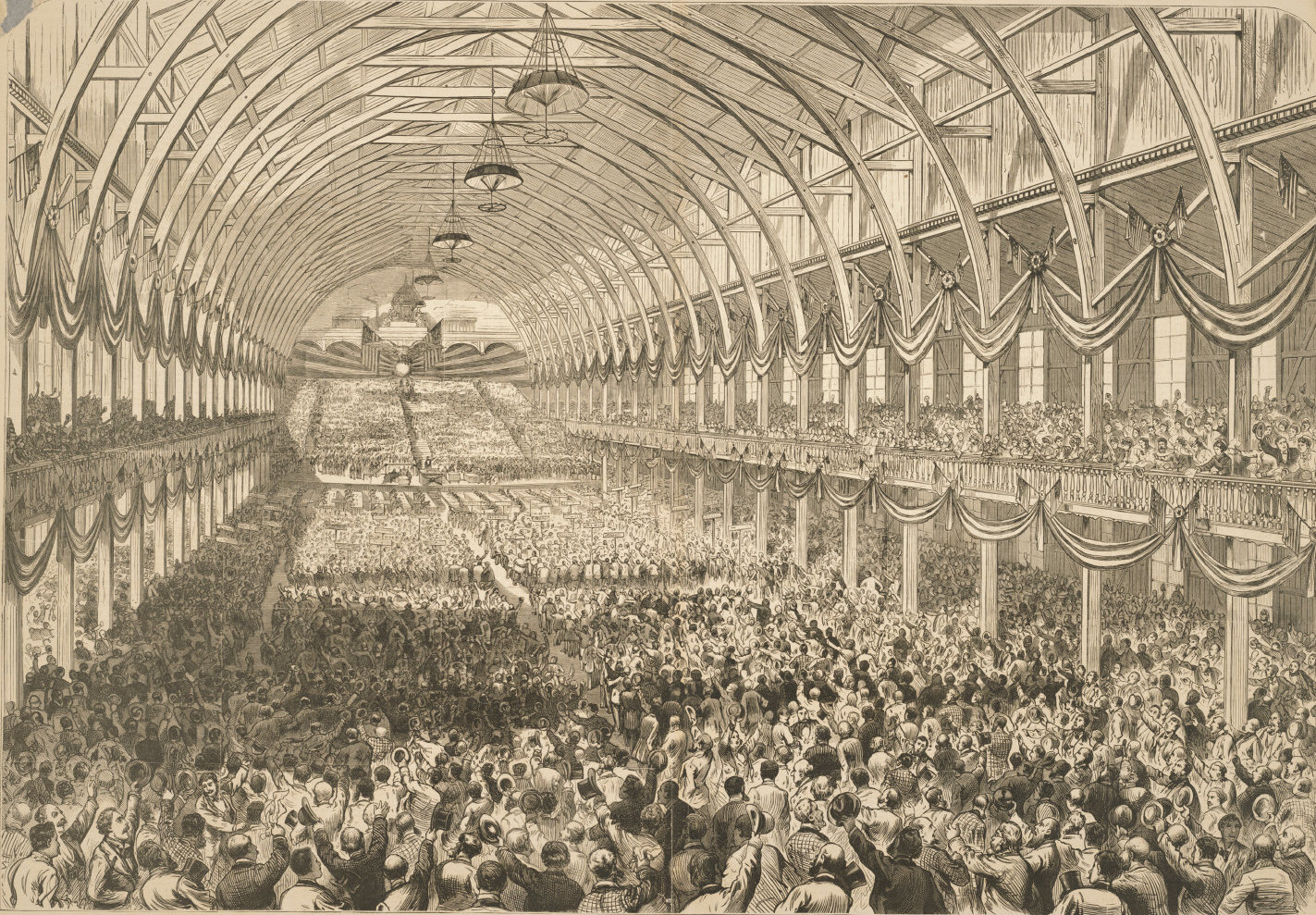
Interior of the Exposition Hall of Cincinnati during the 1876 convention

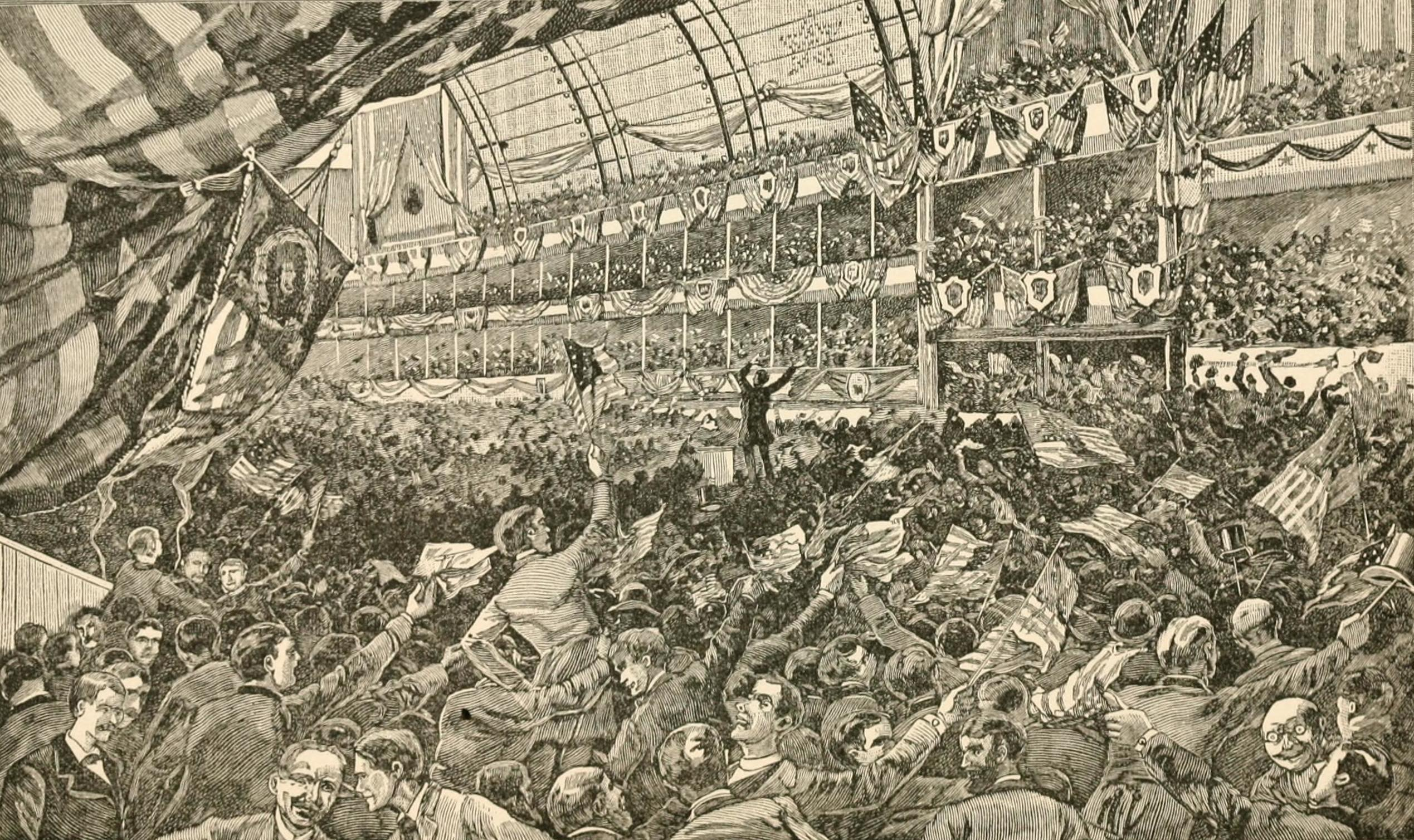
Illustration of the 1888 convention

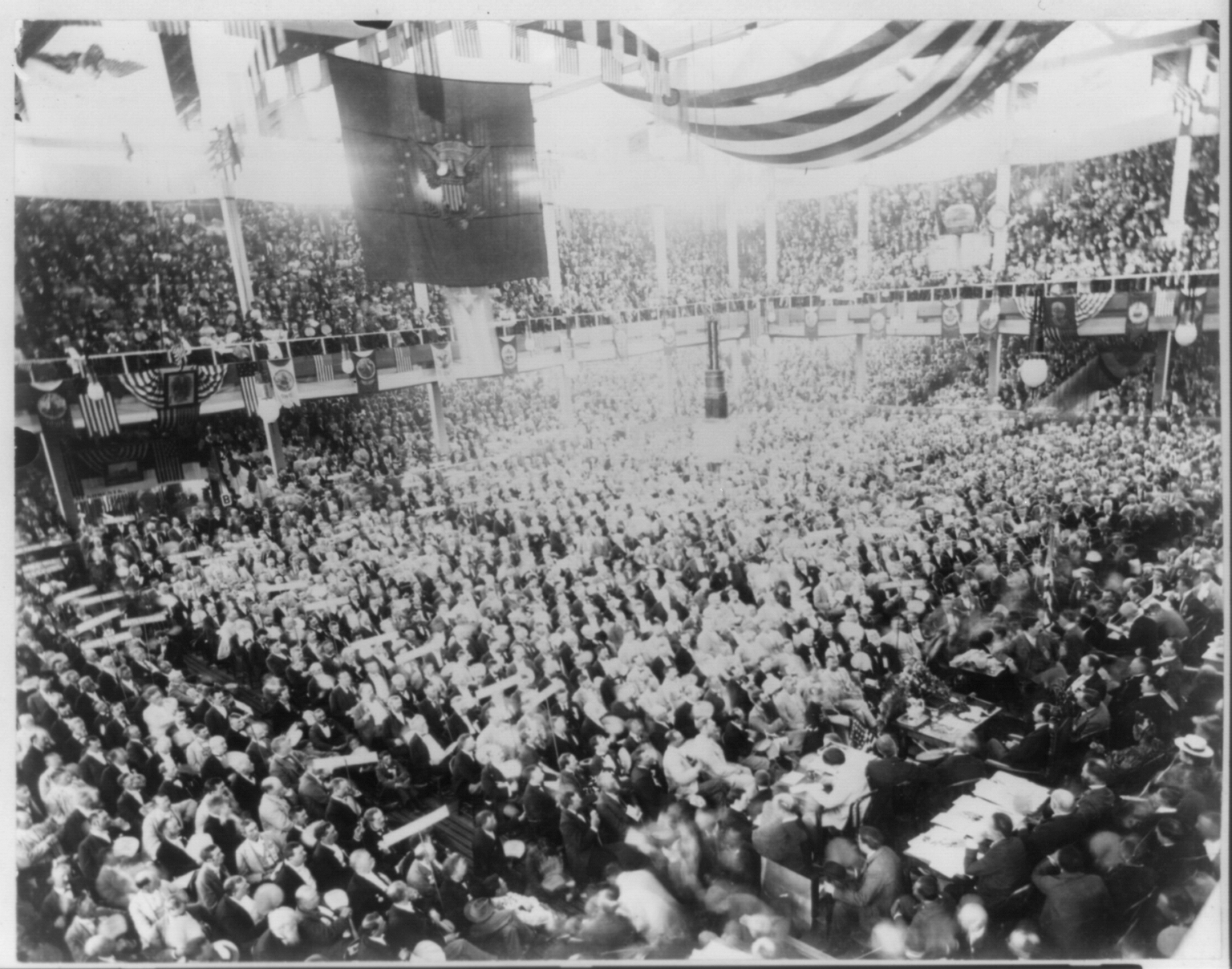
Inside of the 1896 convention hall

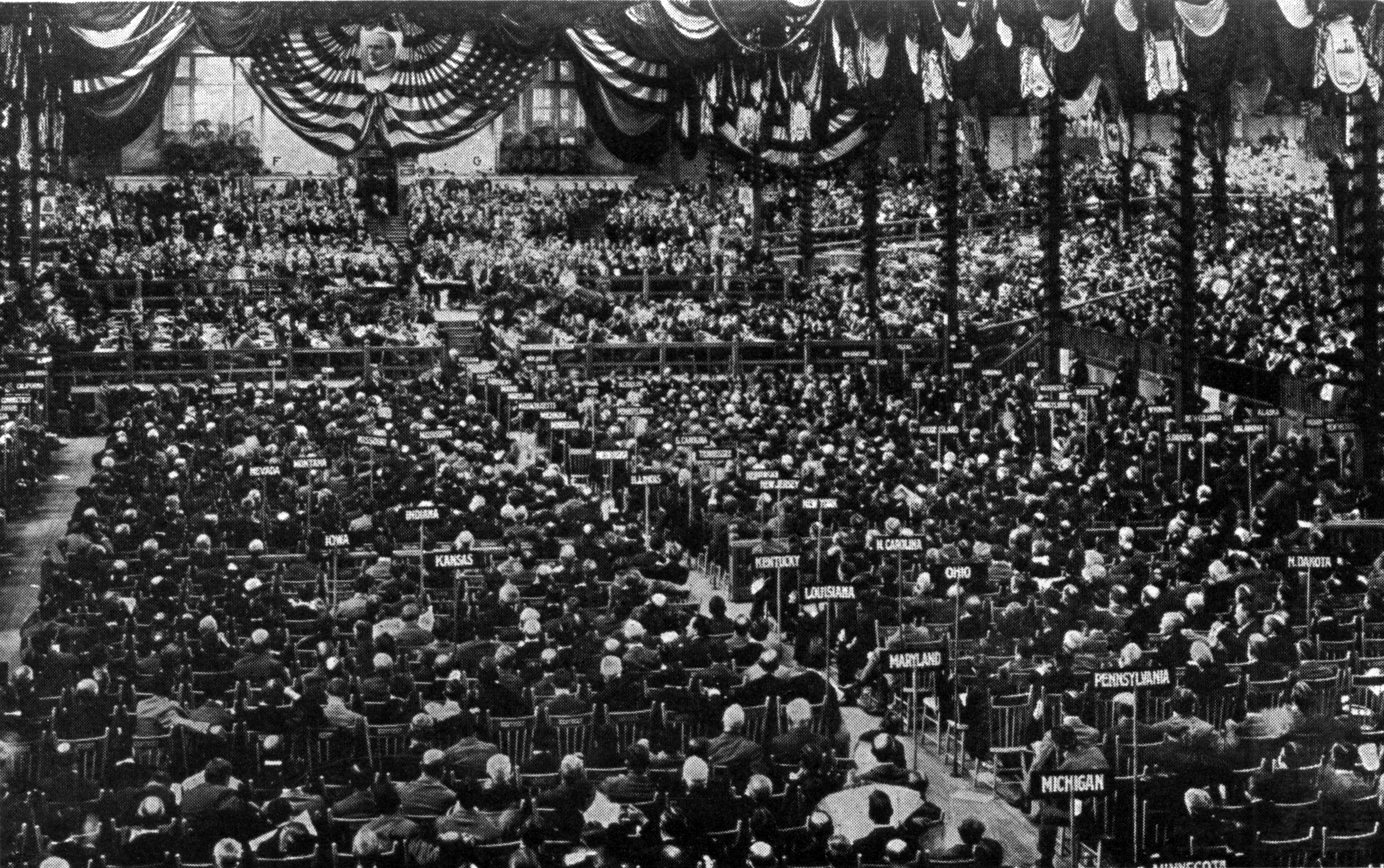
1900 Republican convention

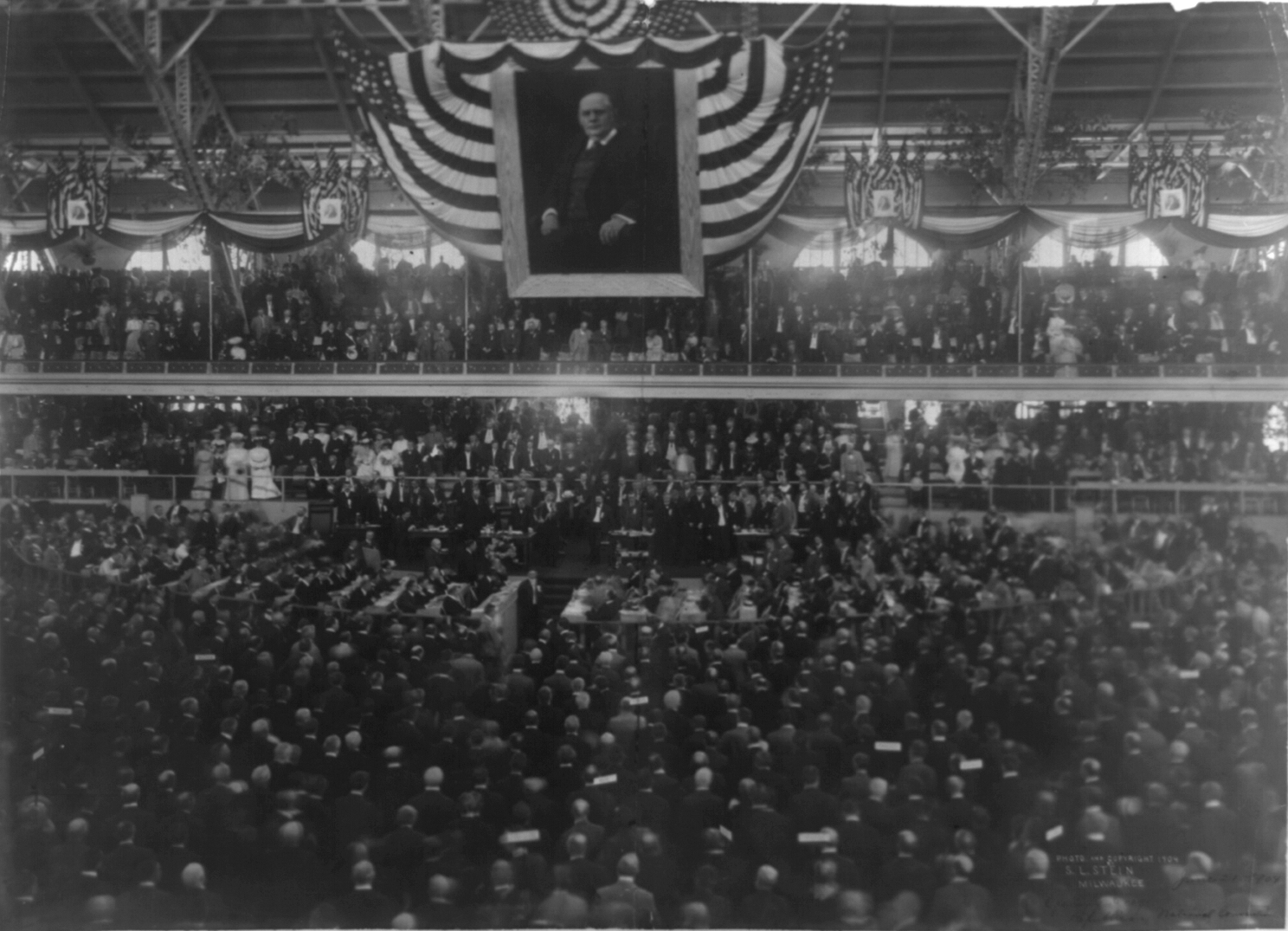
1904 convention hall during the opening prayer

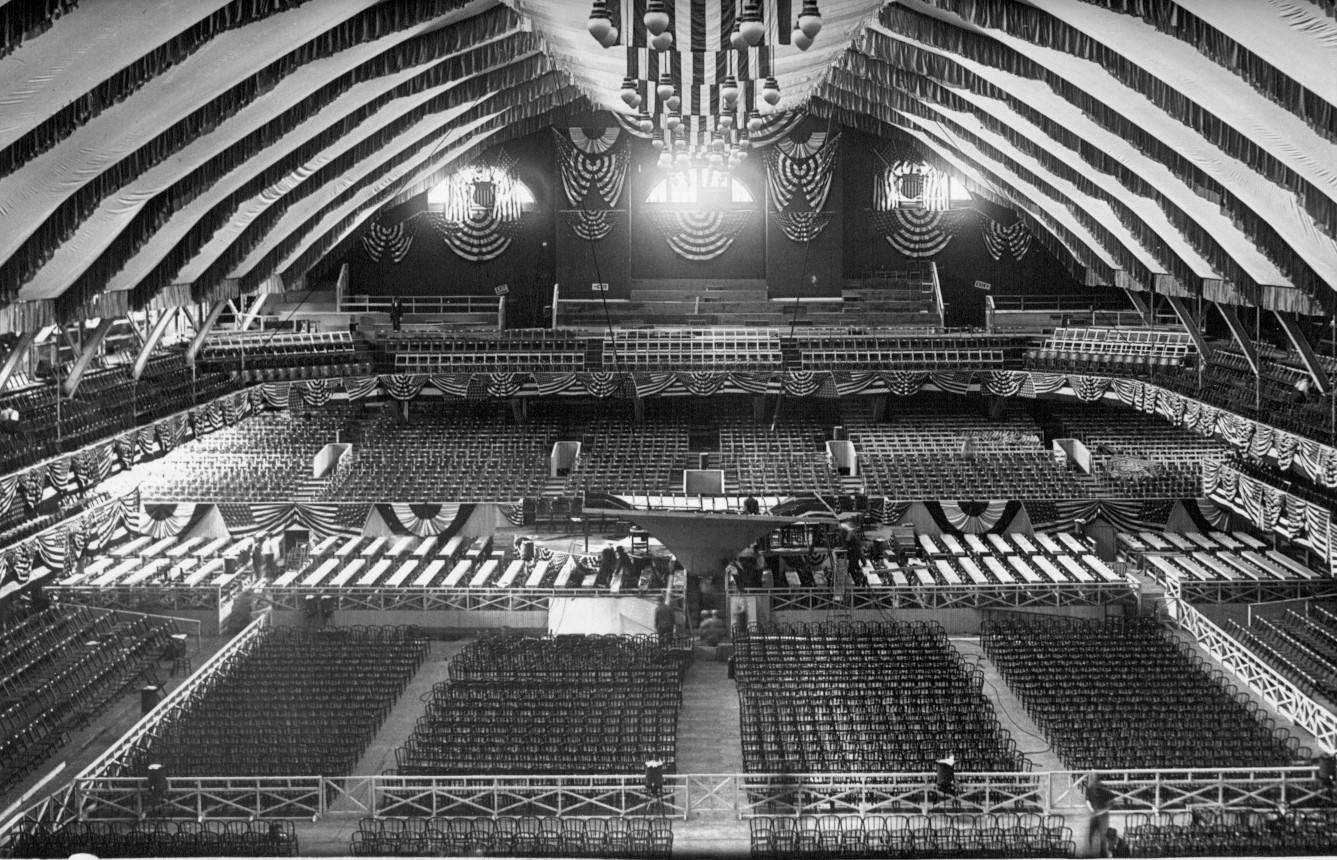
Coliseum set-up for the 1916 convention

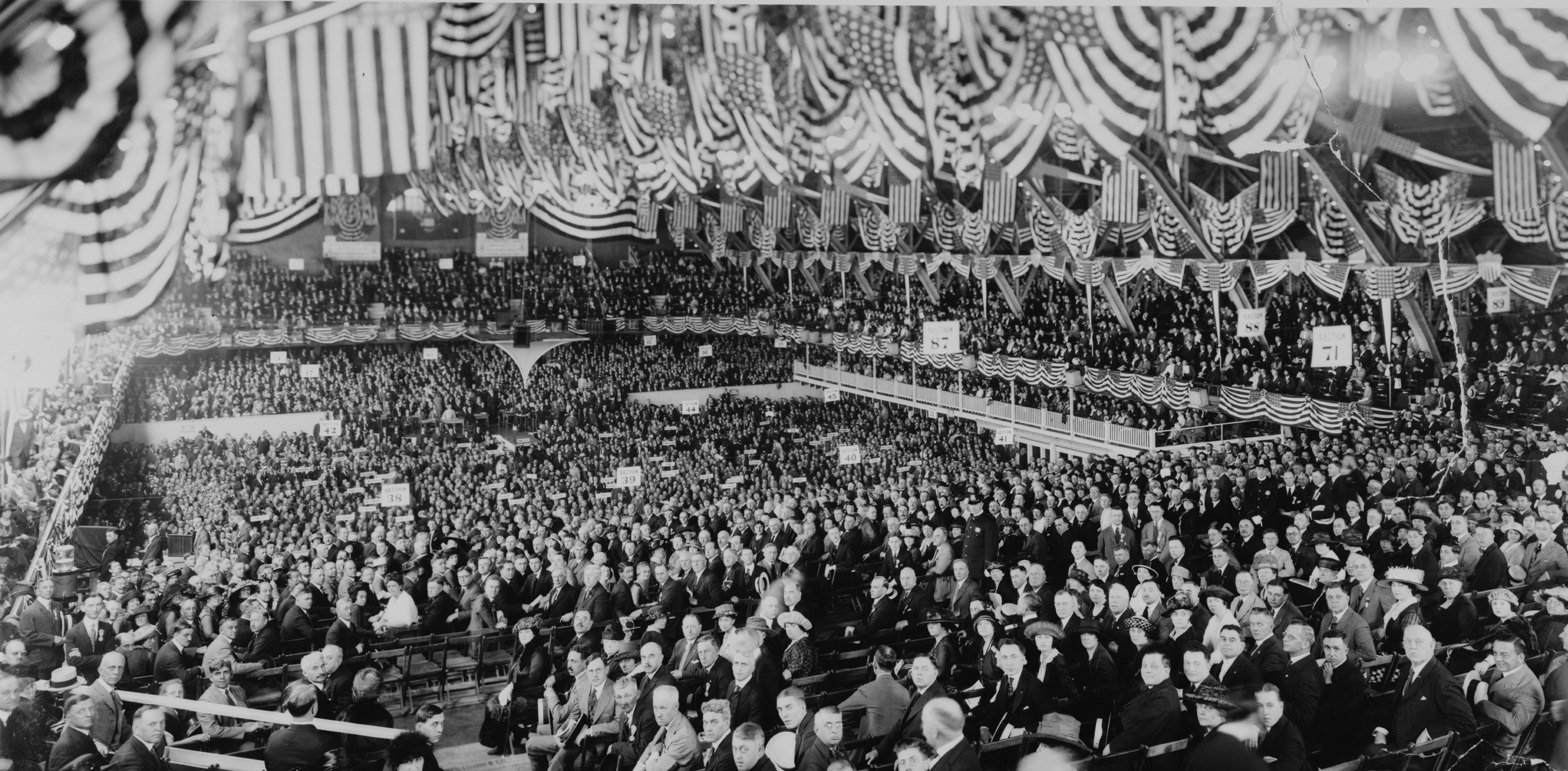
Inside the 1920 convention hall

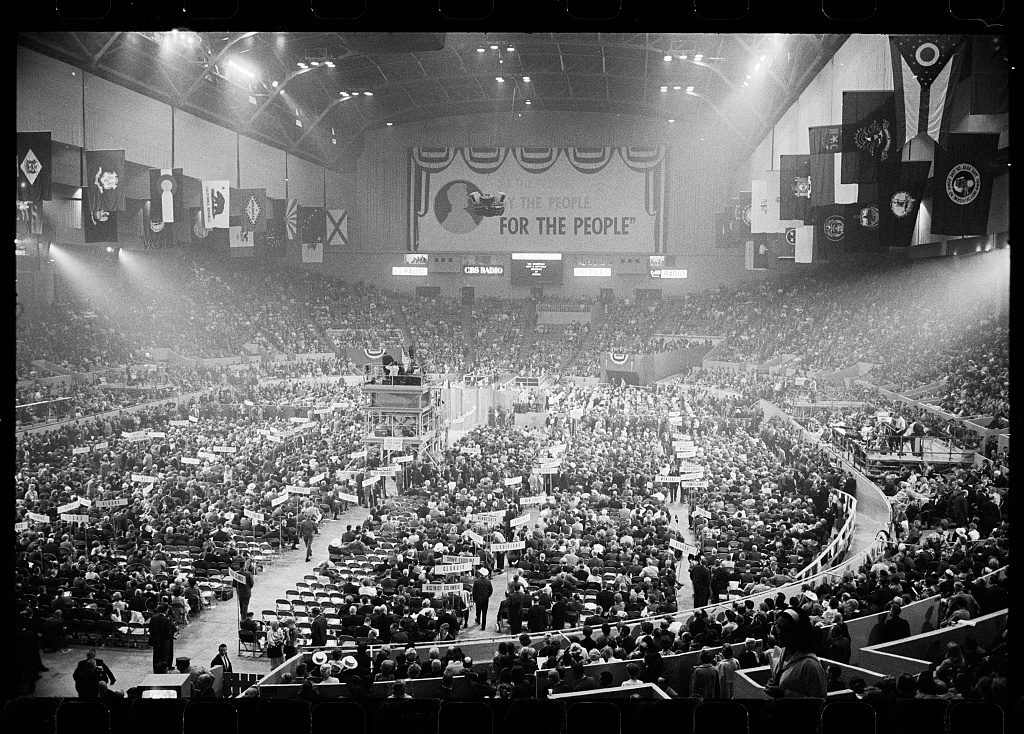
1964 convention in Daly City, California

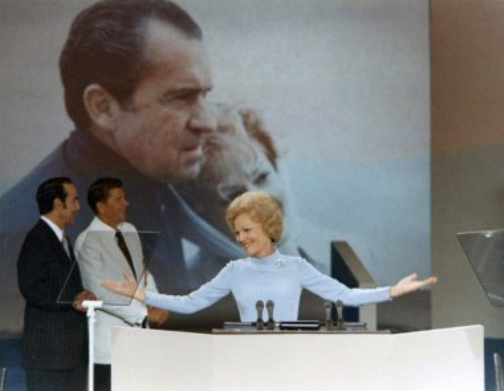
First Lady Pat Nixon addresses the 1972 convention

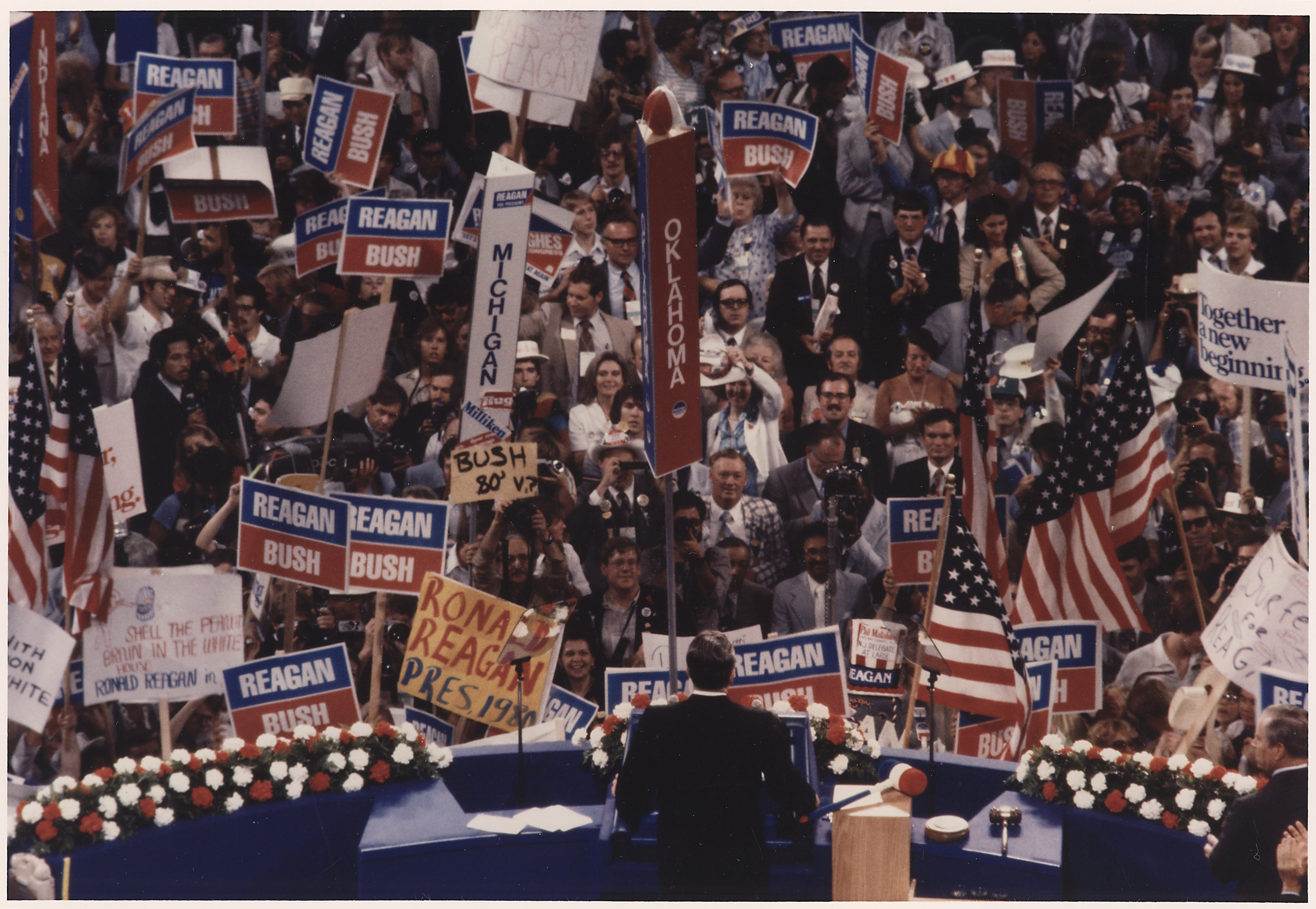
Ronald Reagan giving his 1980 acceptance speech

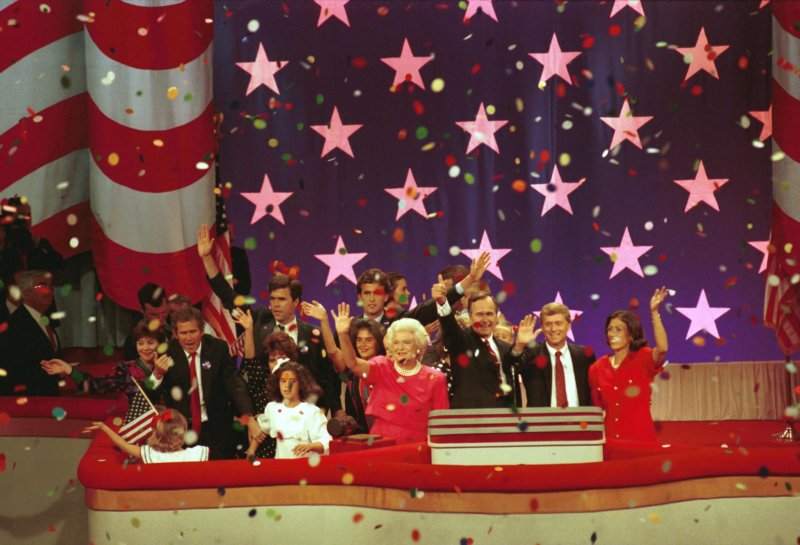
George Bush is joined by his running mate and family at the 1988 convention

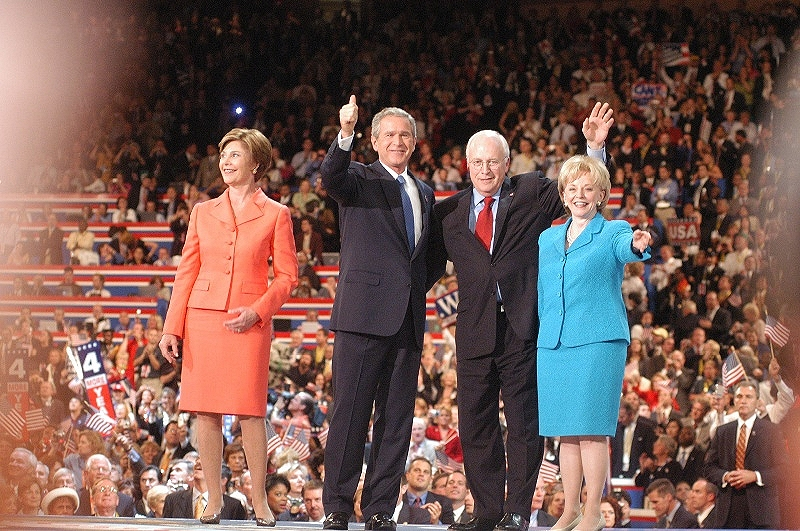
Laura and George Bush with Dick and Lynne Cheney during the 2004 convention

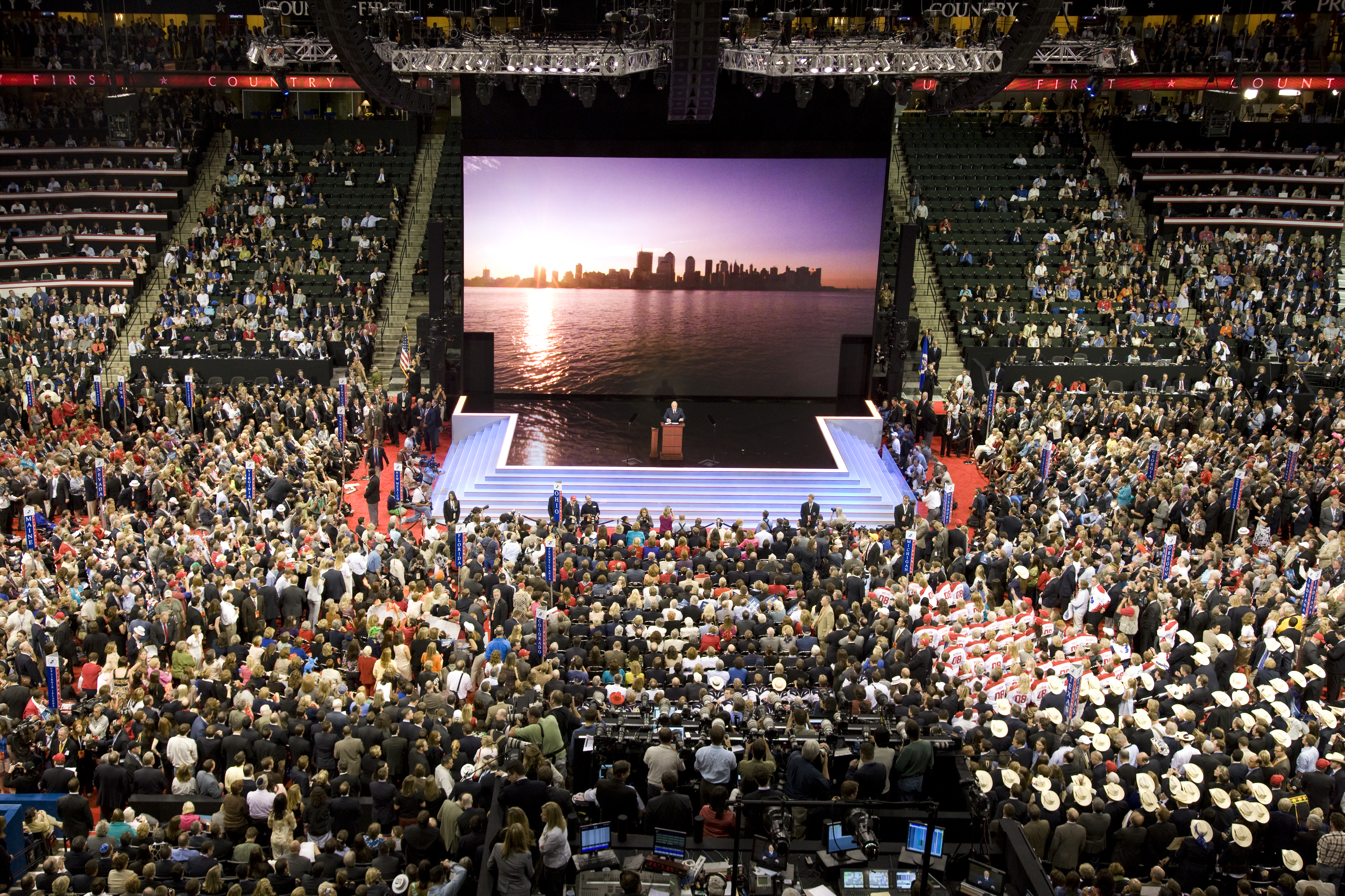
Floor of the 2008 convention.

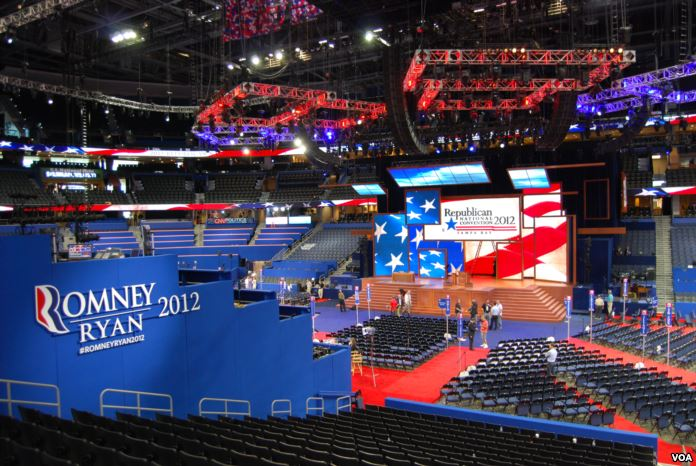
2012 convention

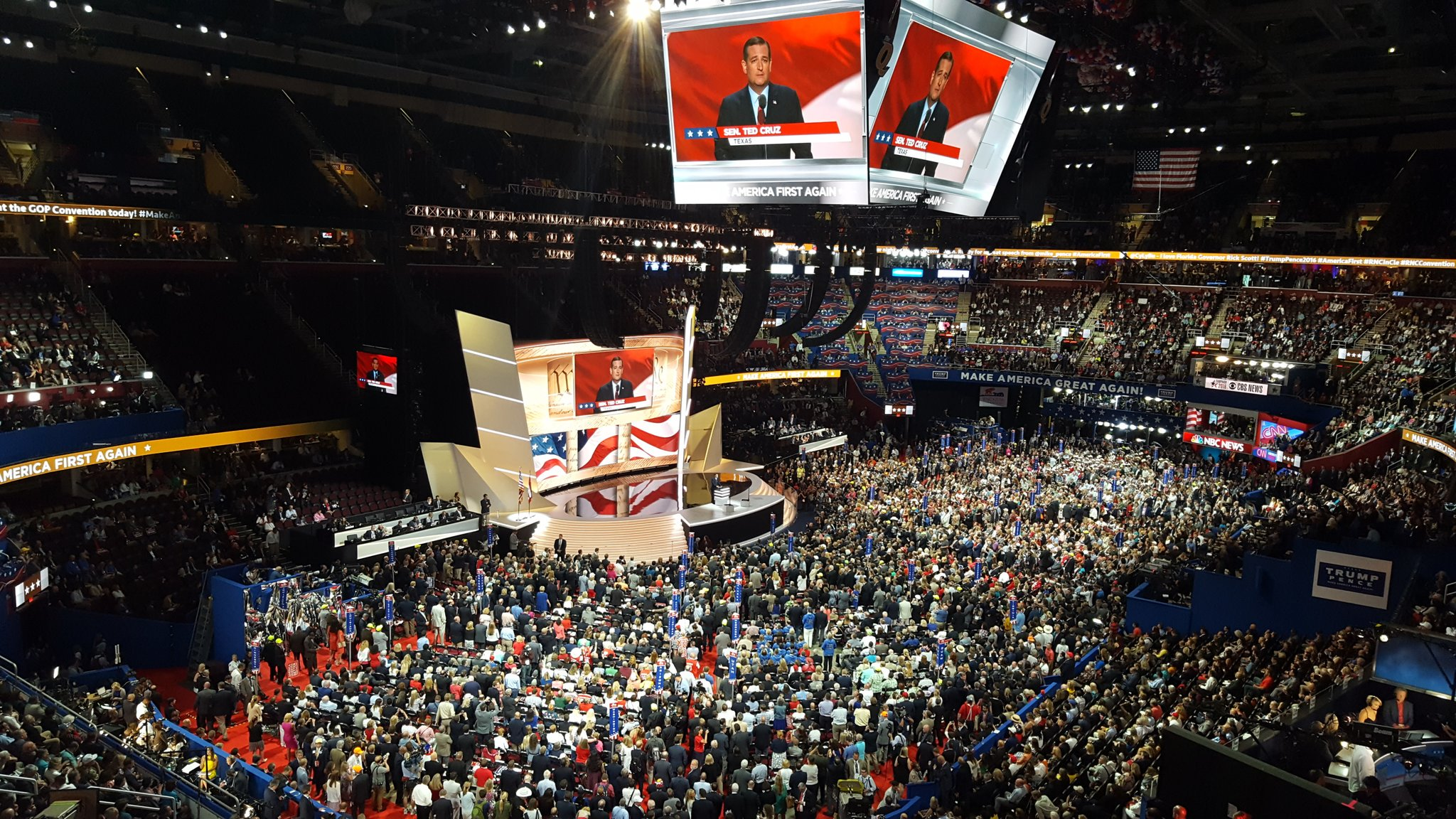
2016 convention

== See also ==
- Bibliography of the history of the Republican Party
- List of United States Republican Party presidential tickets
- List of presidential nominating conventions in the United States
- List of Democratic National Conventions
- List of Whig National Conventions
- United States presidential election
- United States presidential primary
