= 1956 Republican National Convention =

Political convention of the Republican Party

- 1956 presidential election
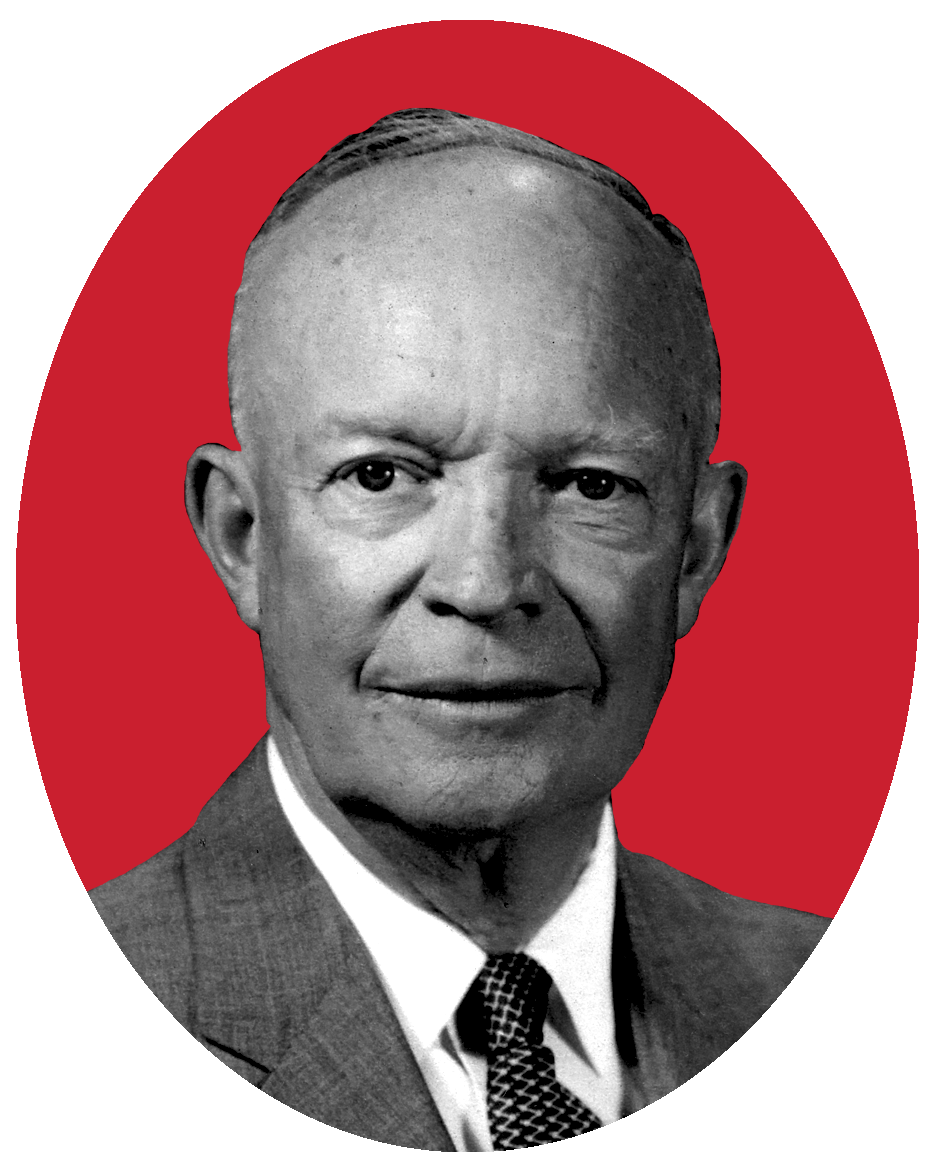
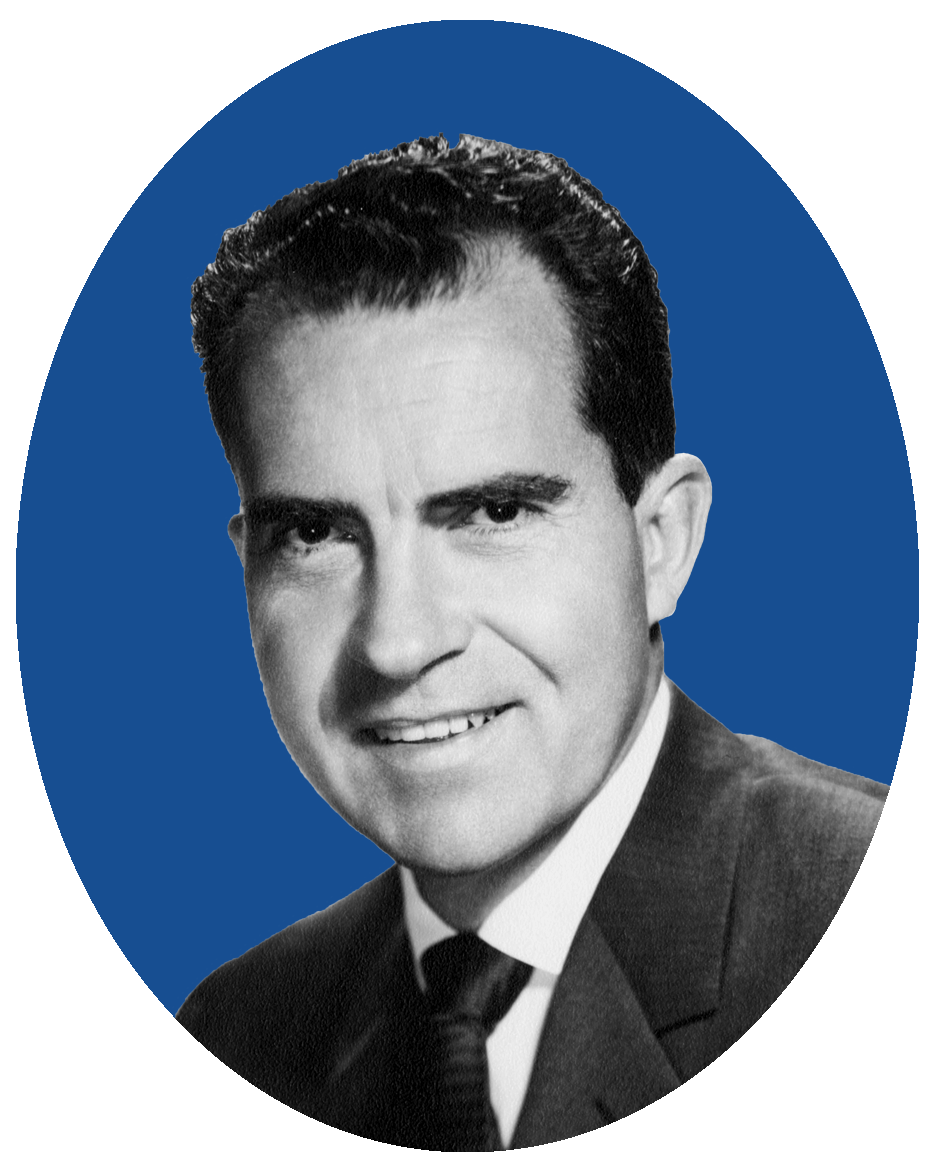
- Nominees; Eisenhower and Nixon

Convention
- Date(s): August 20–23, 1956
- City: Daly City, California
- Venue: Cow Palace
- Keynote speaker: Arthur B. Langlie

Candidates
- Presidential nominee: Dwight D. Eisenhower of Pennsylvania
- Vice-presidential nominee: Richard M. Nixon of California

The 1956 Republican National Convention was held by the Republican Party of the United States at the Cow Palace in San Francisco, California, from August 20 to August 23, 1956. U.S. Senator William F. Knowland was temporary chairman and former speaker of the House Joseph W. Martin Jr. served as permanent chairman. It renominated President Dwight D. Eisenhower and Vice President Richard M. Nixon as the party's candidates for the 1956 presidential election.

On August 23, 1956, singer Nat King Cole spoke at the Republican Convention.

== Convention scheduling ==
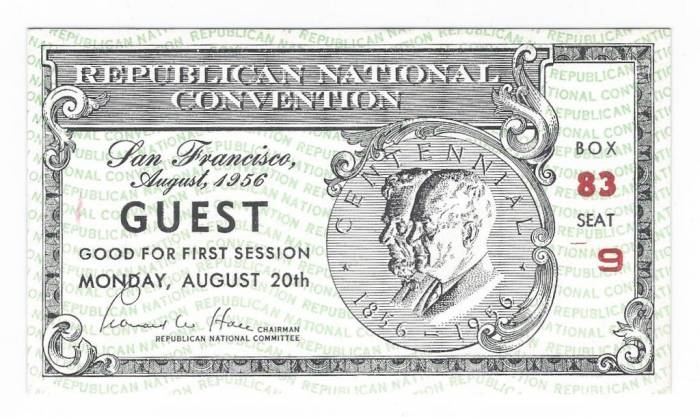
Entrance ticket, featuring illustrations of both Eisenhower and Abraham Lincoln (the first Republican to be elected president) and featuring a commemoration of the centennial of the party's first presidential convention in (held in 1856)

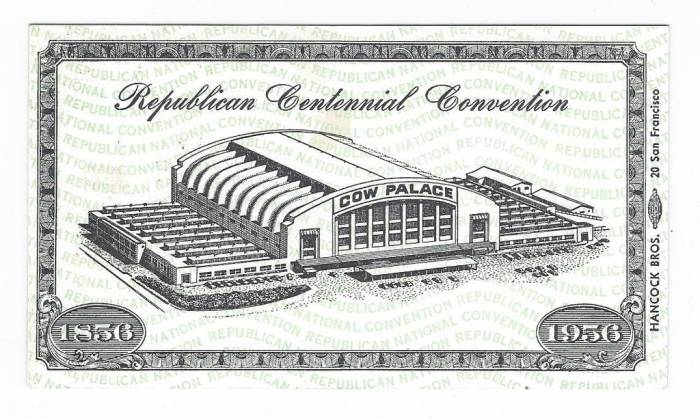
Back of entrance ticket, with an illustration of the Cow Palace (the main venue of the convention)

The 1956 Republican convention was held after that year's Democratic National Convention. This was unusual, as since 1864, in every election but 1888, Democrats had held their convention second. It has become an informal tradition that the party holding the White House (which, accordingly, in 1956 had been the Republican Party) hosts their convention second, but it is unclear when this tradition began (Democrats had held the White House and held their conventions second between 1936 and 1952, but it is unclear whether they scheduled their conventions second in these years because of their White House incumbency, or whether they scheduled them second because it was traditional that Democratic National Conventions had been held after the Republican National Convention).

== Presidential nomination ==
=== Presidential candidates ===
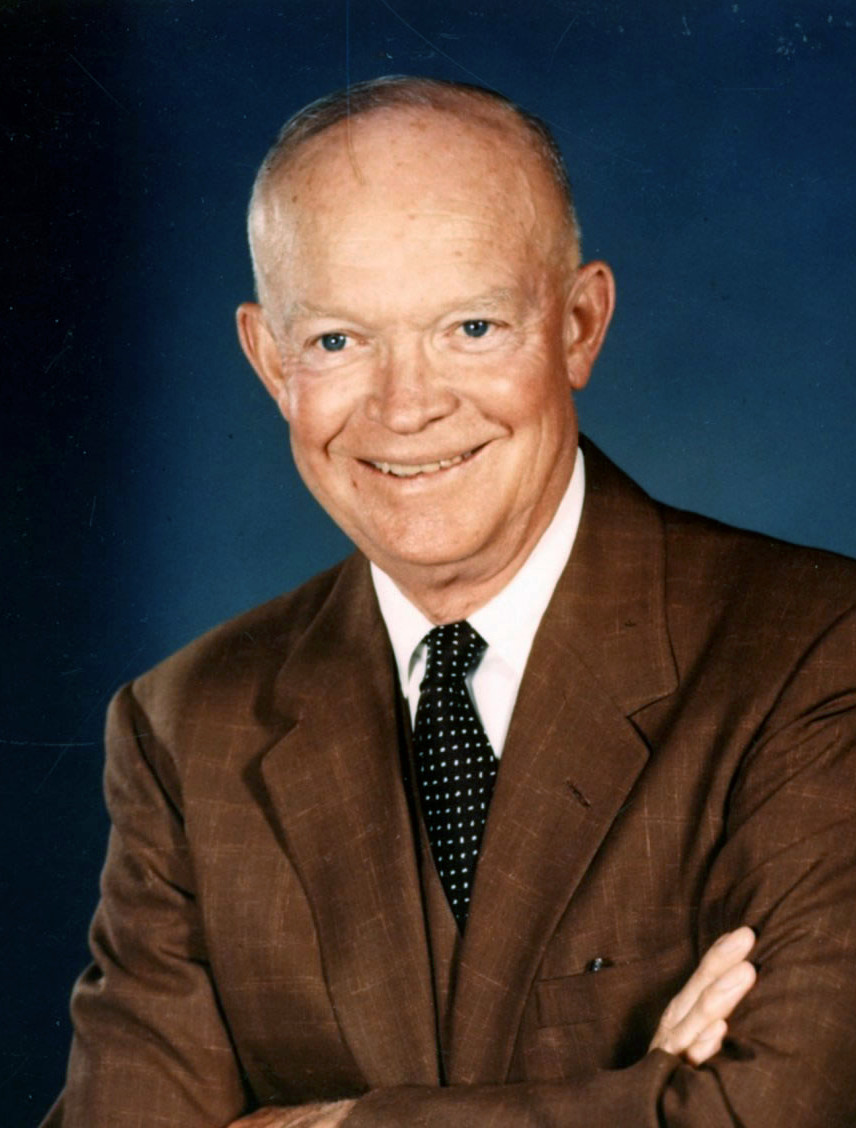
President
Dwight D. Eisenhower
of Pennsylvania

President Eisenhower was unanimously re-nominated by the Republican delegates for President of the United States.

Presidential Balloting
Candidate	1st
Eisenhower	1,323

Presidential Balloting / 3rd Day of Convention (August 22, 1956)

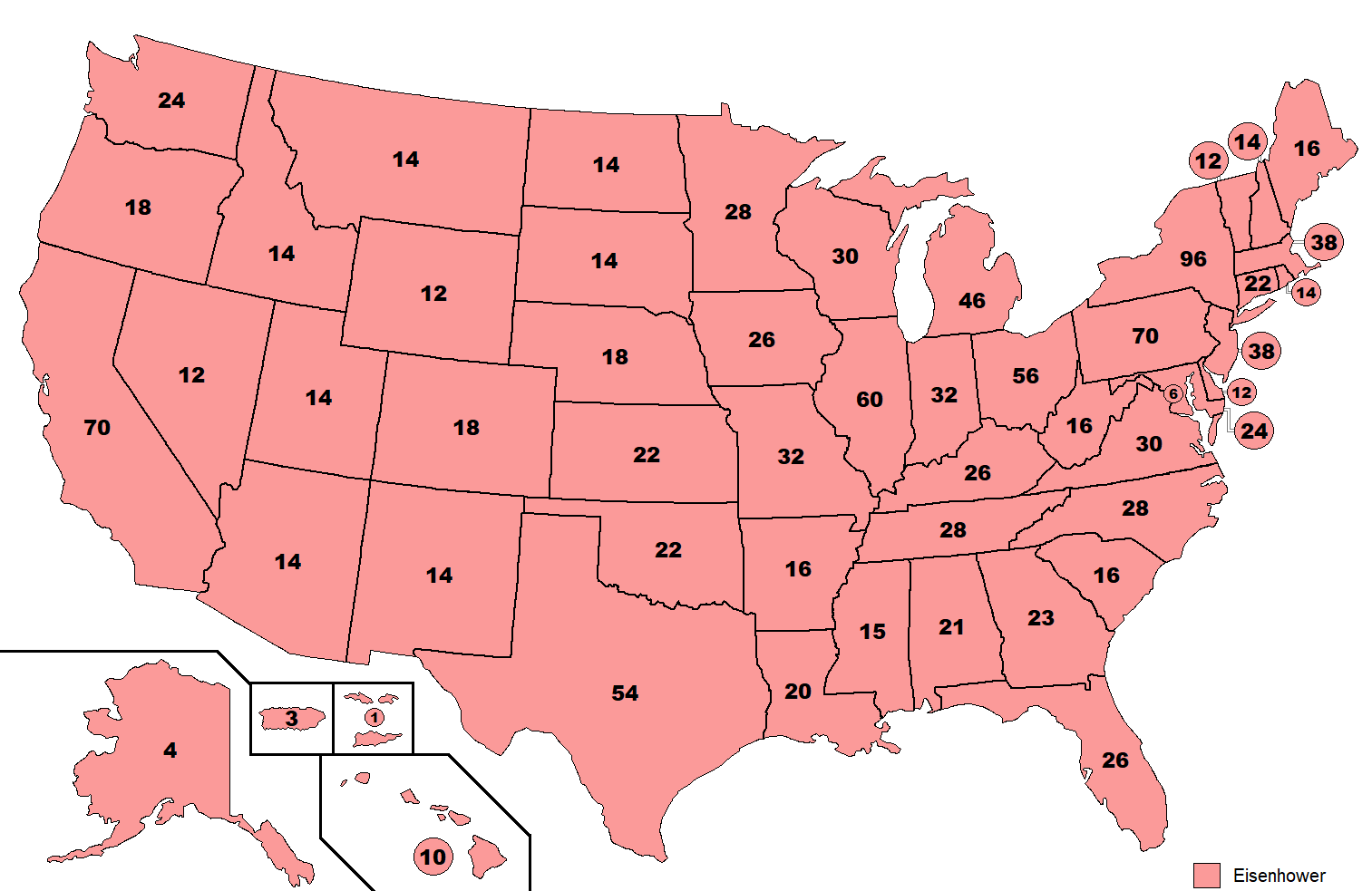
1st Presidential Ballot

== Vice Presidential nomination ==
=== Vice Presidential candidates ===
Vice President
Richard Nixon
from California
(1953-1961)

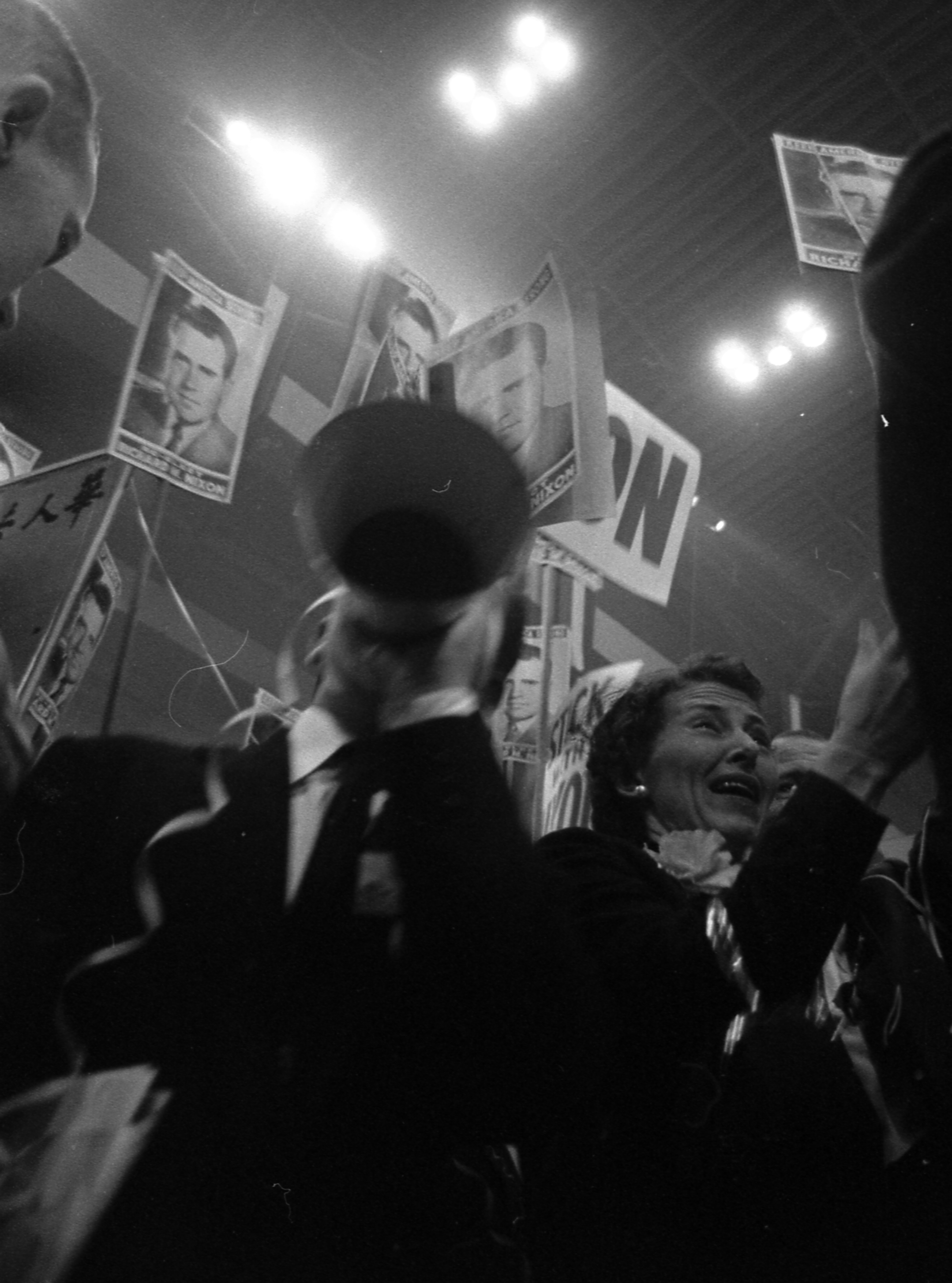
Convention-goers at the 1956 Republican National Convention holding signs for Richard Nixon.

Eisenhower had considered other running mates, but with his health a concern, he ultimately decided that Vice President Richard Nixon was best prepared to assume the presidency. By the time of the convention, a unanimous renomination for Nixon was expected until one renegade delegate, former Democratic Congressman and perennial candidate Terry Carpenter, decided to place in nomination for vice president a man named Joe Smith, from Carpenter's own Terrytown, Nebraska. When asked who Joe Smith was at the 1956 convention, Carpenter mysteriously replied, "Oh, he is a symbol of an open convention, in that sense of the word." It was eventually revealed that there was no such man, and that his nomination was a protest against the perceived political theater of the closed 1956 Republican National Convention. Carpenter ultimately did cast his one dissenting vote for vice president for Joe Smith.

Vice Presidential Balloting
Candidate	1st
Nixon	1,322
Smith	1

Vice Presidential Balloting / 3rd Day of Convention (August 22, 1956)

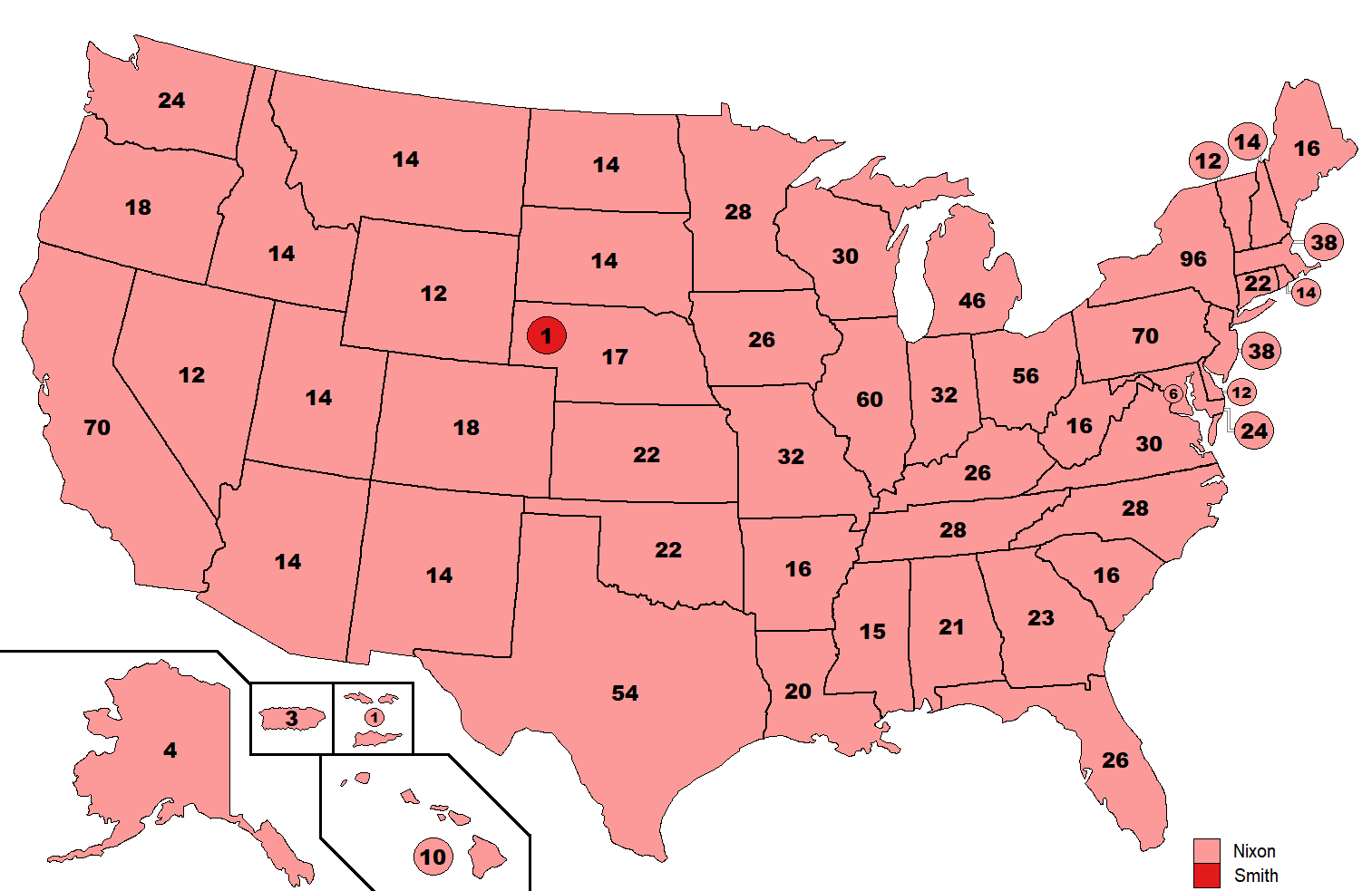
1st
Vice Presidential Ballot

== Keynote address ==
The keynote speaker at the convention was Arthur B. Langlie, the governor of Washington.

== See also ==
- History of the United States Republican Party
- List of Republican National Conventions
- 1956 Democratic National Convention
- 1956 United States presidential election
- United States presidential nominating convention

Preceded by 1952; Chicago, Illinois	Republican National Conventions	Succeeded by 1960; Chicago, Illinois
