= Convention (meeting) =

Large gathering to discuss a common interest

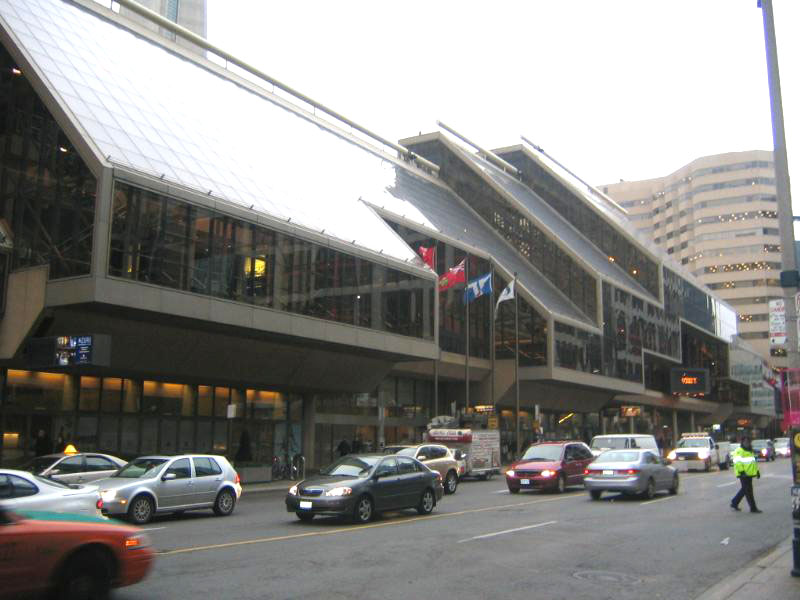
Metro Toronto Convention Centre, late 2004.

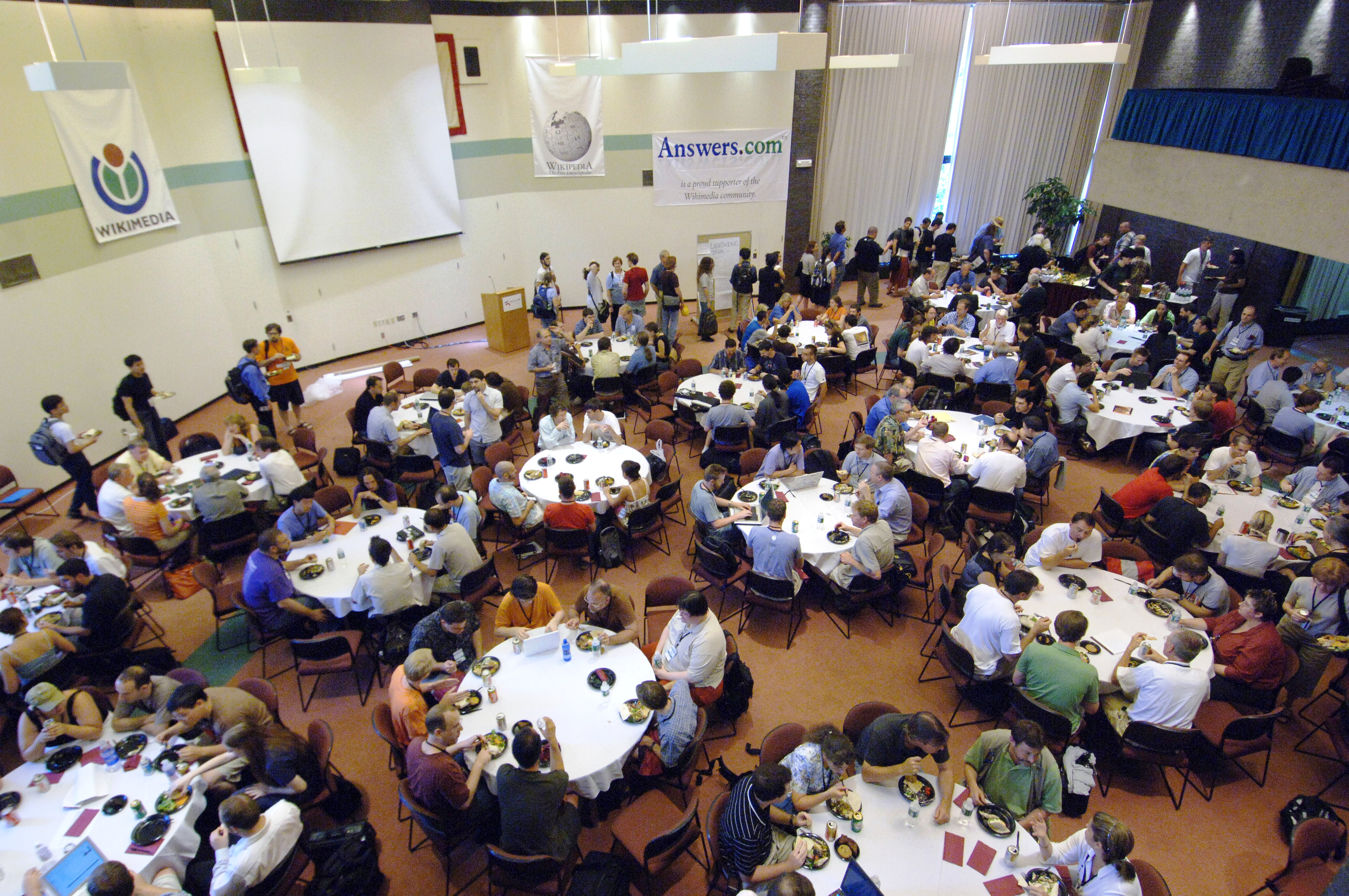
Wikimania 2006: Photo of some participants during the lunch break. Wikimania is an international conference of users of Wikipedia and other projects operated by the Wikimedia Foundation, which has been held annually since 2005.

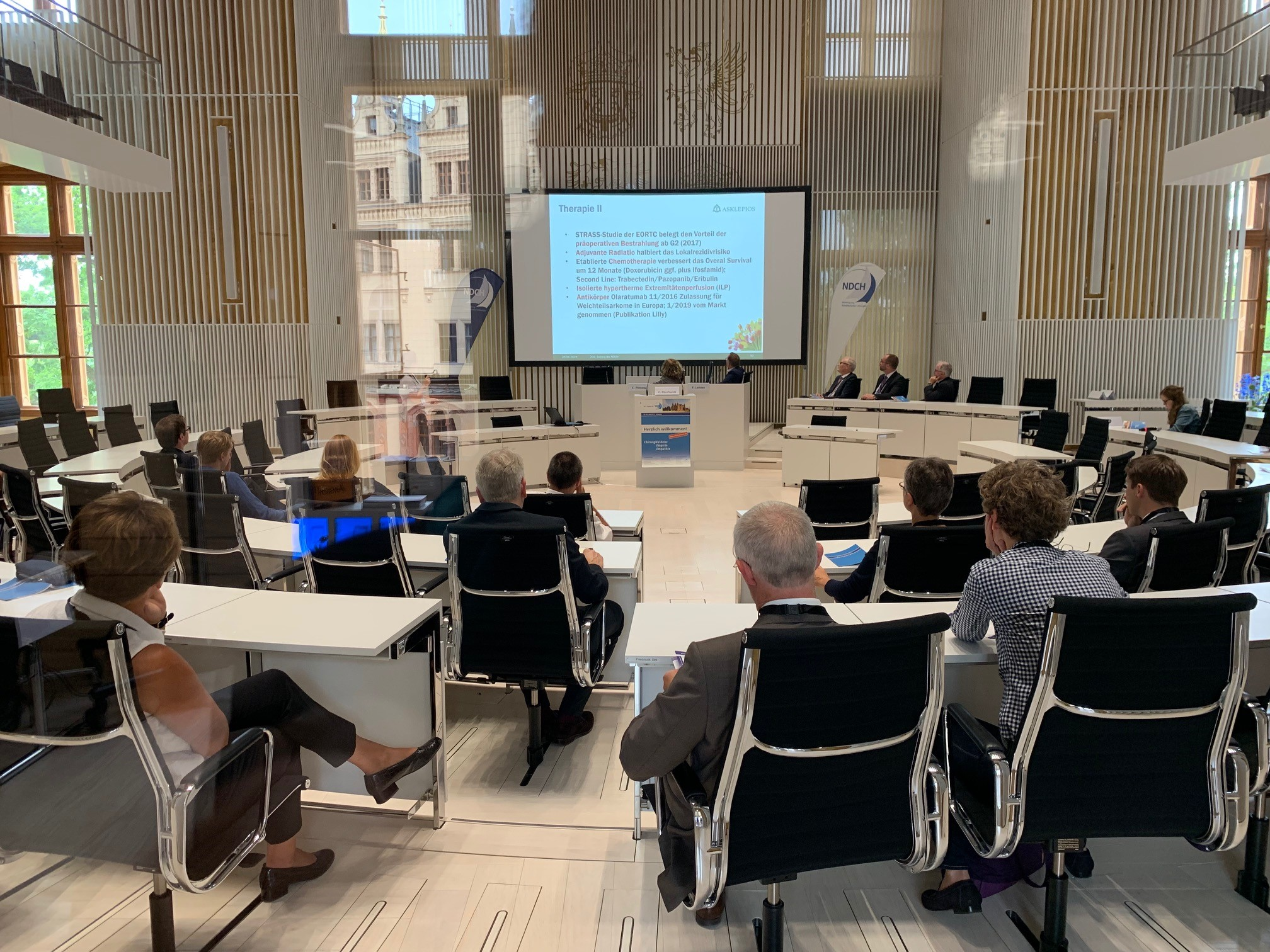
Lecture during the summer meeting of the Association of North German Surgeons in the Mecklenburg-Western Pomerania State Parliament building.

A convention (or event), in the sense of a meeting, is a gathering of individuals who meet at an arranged place and time in order to discuss or engage in some common interest. The most common conventions are based upon industry, profession, and fandom. Trade conventions typically focus on a particular industry or industry segment, and feature keynote speakers, vendor displays, and other information and activities of interest to the event organizers and attendees. Professional conventions focus on issues of concern along with advancements related to the profession. Such conventions are generally organized by societies or communities dedicated to promotion of the topic of interest. Fan conventions usually feature displays, shows, and sales based on pop culture and guest celebrities. Science fiction conventions traditionally partake of the nature of both professional conventions and fan conventions, with the balance varying from one to another. Conventions also exist for various hobbies, such as gaming or model railroads.

Conventions are often planned and coordinated, often in exacting detail, by professional meeting and convention planners, either by staff of the convention's hosting company or by outside specialists. Most large cities will have a convention center dedicated to hosting such events. The term MICE (Meetings, Incentives, Conferencing, Exhibitions) is widely used in Asia as a description of the industry. The Convention ("C") is one of the most dynamic elements in the M.I.C.E. segment. The industry is generally regulated under the tourism sector.

In the technical sense, a convention is a meeting of delegates or representatives. The 1947 Newfoundland National Convention is a classic example of a state-sponsored political convention. More often, organizations made up of smaller units, chapters, or lodges, such as labor unions, honorary societies, and fraternities and sororities, meet as a whole in convention by sending delegates of the units to deliberate on the organization's common issues. This also applies to a political convention, though in modern times the common issues are limited to selecting a party candidate or party chairman. In this technical sense, a congress, when it consists of representatives, is a convention. The British House of Commons is a convention, as are most other houses of a modern representative legislature. The National Convention or just "Convention" in France comprised the constitutional and legislative assembly which sat from September 20, 1792, to October 26, 1795. The governing bodies of religious groups may also be called conventions, such as the General Convention of the Episcopal Church in the United States of America and the Southern Baptist Convention.

== In the United States ==
Conventions in general enjoy a long history and rich tradition within the United States due in part to their epistemic, moral, and transformative nature. So much so that they have been stitched into the fabric of American government. There is an abundance of case law, historical precedent, examples of congressional intent, and Constitutional language, that demonstrate that the Federal government of the United States formally recognizes conventions, wherever they may arise in constitutional law, as short-term deliberative assemblies. As such, they are subject to the rights of the People to enjoy free of governmental interference of any kind. Throughout the history of the United States, conventions have served as a mechanism of self-governance, providing a vehicle to secure public rights through constitutions, or as a mechanism of redress to amend them. In fact, they have been instrumental to the nation's continued development into the representative democracy it is today.

=== Historical Conventions in the United States ===
==== Confederate Conventions and the Founding of the Republic ====
During the Confederation period under the Articles of Confederation, the former British colonies of North America had united to form a wartime confederation of states. One characterized by state representation in a weak and decentralized central government headed by the unicameral Congress of the Confederation, the precursor to the modern-day United States Senate.

One convention of particular note during this time was held between September 11–14, 1786 in Annapolis, Maryland. The Annapolis Convention, was convened primarily to address issues of commerce between the states, but the agenda quickly became focused upon a wide range of deficiencies posed by the current frame of government. The convention ended with a resolution by Alexander Hamilton calling for a convention to amend the Articles of Confederation. Following Hamilton's suggestion, the Confederate Congress called a convention "to render the constitution … adequate to the exigencies of the Union." The Philadelphia Convention begin on May 14, 1787, and ended on September 17, with a proposal for a new Constitution for the union.

==== Conventions under the US Constitution ====
===== Notable Civic Conventions =====
With the guarantee of deliberative assemblies as a mechanism of redress under the First Amendment to the United States Constitution, conventions have proven fundamental in civic actions meant to secure fundamental rights and civil liberties; such as, the Seneca Falls Convention, the Rochester Women's Rights Convention of 1848, and the National Women's Rights Conventions. Collectively, these conventions directly led to the Nineteenth Amendment to the United States Constitution securing a woman's right to vote.

The Colored Conventions Movement was a series of national, regional, and state conventions held irregularly during the decades preceding and following the American Civil War. These conventions offered opportunities for free-born and formerly enslaved African Americans to organize and strategize for racial justice. These early conventions argued for the abolition of slavery, equal educational opportunities, land reform, and the merits of emigration out of the United States.

===== Interstate Commissions =====
Prior to the ratification of the United States Constitution, a convention of independent states would hold sovereign power over the Confederate Congress. However, most of these conventions were called by state legislatures to resolve boundary disputes; others were called for economic purposes; such as was the case with the Annapolis Convention that ultimately led to the framing of the Constitution. Since ratification however, it has become widely understood that the Constitution recognizes the authority of states and state legislatures to appoint commissioners to these types of conventions. Although any agreements they may reach are subject to Congressional approval under the Commerce Clause. Examples of this form of convention include the Yellowstone River Compact Commission, Red River Compact Commission, Colorado River Compact, and the Delaware River Basin Commission.

====== Interstate Conventions ======
Interstate conventions, otherwise known as conventions of states, may be called by the Governor as well, such was the case with a series of meetings from December 15, 1814, to January 5, 1815, collectively known as the Hartford Convention. The convention was called to address the ongoing War of 1812, as well as, an array of problems arising from the growth of the federal government.

====== Single State Conventions ======
Single state conventions may be called due to a provision of the state's constitution, by referendum, or in response to amendment proposal from Congress. To date, there have been 233 state-level conventions in the history of the United States, all of which convened to revise or even entirely rewrite their state constitutions. In each and everyone of these convention, delegates were elected to the Convention.

===== Corporate and Political Conventions =====
====== Corporate Conventions ======
Conventions are ubiquitous in the corporate sector and include the State Conventions of the National Association of Realtors and the Annual Convention for the Cleaning Equipment Trade Association for just two of countless examples.

====== Political Conventions ======
Presidential nominating conventions are called by political parties in the United States. They have been a permanent feature of the government since its founding.

===== Federal Conventions Under Article One of The United States Constitution =====
After the Civil War, Congress passed the Reconstruction Acts, resulting in the states that once comprised the Confederate States of America being divided into military districts. These Acts of Congress mandated that the rebel states revise their constitutions by means of conventions of elected delegates, to include the ratification of the thirteenth, fourteenth, and fifteenth amendments to the United States Constitution.

===== Federal Conventions Under Article Four of The United States Constitution =====
Congress has also frequently employed conventions for the admission of new states to the Union under Article Four of the United States Constitution. In all, a total of thirty-one states were admitted to the union in this manner. In each and every case, under the authority derived directly from the federal constitution, Congress mandated an election of delegates with the passage of an enabling act; such as these notable examples:

- Enabling Act of 1802, for the formation of Ohio from the Northwest Territory
- Enabling Act of 1864, for the formation of Nevada
- Enabling Act of 1889, for the formation of North Dakota, South Dakota, Montana, and Washington
- Enabling Act of 1894, for the formation of Utah
- Enabling Act of 1906 for the formation of Oklahoma from Oklahoma Territory and Indian Territory
- Enabling Act of 1910, for the admission of Arizona and New Mexico

===== Conventions Under Article Five of The United States Constitution =====
====== Federal Proposal Convention ======
Among the most enigmatic of all conventions, Article Five of the United States Constitution provides for the calling of a constitutional convention, more commonly known as a Convention to propose amendments, whereby delegates are elected in equal fashion to Members of the United States Congress, to deliberate and propose amendments to the Constitution. Under Article Five, Congress is obligated to call such a convention when thirty-four states have formally submitted to Congress, a joint resolution known as a state application. To date, the Clerk of the United States House of Representatives has identified nearly two hundred of these applications. Yet, this method of proposal remains elusive and has never occurred in the history of the United States.

====== State Ratification Conventions ======
Article Five also provides that Congress may choose among two modes of ratification, either by means of state legislatures or by state conventions. To date the state convention ratification mode was used by Congress just once, to ratify the Twenty-first Amendment to the United States Constitution which ended prohibition. As a result, many states have statutory provisions providing for the elections of delegates for future ratification conventions.

===== Conventions Under Article Seven of The United States Constitution =====
The Delegates of the Philadelphia Convention chose state conventions instead of state legislatures as the bodies to consider ratification of the Constitution. They broadly believed that ratification by means of conventions would better represent the will of the People and this process "would make the new federal Constitution superior to any specific legislature." Thus the convention mode of ratification became enshrined within Article Seven of the United States Constitution. The Constitution was eventually adopted per the provisions of Article Seven as the Supreme Law of the Land through a series of Ratification Conventions that ultimately culminated on May 29, 1790, with the final ratification which was provided by the State of Rhode Island.

==== Controversies ====
===== Confusion Between State and Federal Conventions =====
Despite this long history of conventions in the United States dating back well before the ratification of the Constitution, confusion and controversy has emerged in recent decades. Perhaps, most prominent among them is the distinction between what constitutes a state convention and what constitutes a federal convention. Fortunately this can be determined by identification of the convening authority. A federal convention is one called and convened for the purpose of exercising a federal function under authority deriving directly from the United States Constitution. Conversely, state legislatures only exercise federal functions when they apply to Congress for a convention to propose amendments or when they call a convention to ratify a proposed amendment submitted to the states by Congress. Otherwise conventions called and convened under authority deriving directly from a state's constitution, are limited to addressing the constitutional matters of that particular state alone.

===== Lacunae in Statutory Law =====
Nearly all of the sovereign states do not yet have statutory provisions for conventions beyond their permanent legislature, state amendatory conventions, and conventions for ratification of proposals to amend the Constitution. There are no state laws explicitly providing for the election of delegates for a convention to propose amendments to the Constitution.

== See also ==
- Academic conference
- Annual general meeting
- Business travel
- Caucus
- Convention center
- Delegate
- Event planning
- Forum
- Summit
- Symposium
- Seminar
- Workshop
- Event
- Convention
- Congress
