= National Congress Party =

National Congress Party may refer to:

- National Congress Party (Sudan), the ruling political party in Sudan from 1998 until 2019.
- National Ittihadi Congress, Morocco
- Indian National Congress, a major political party in India
- Nationalist Congress Party of India, based in the state of Maharashtra
  - Nationalist Congress Party (Ajit Pawar Faction)
  - Nationalist Congress Party – Sharadchandra Pawar

== See also ==
- National Congress (disambiguation)
