= National Conference =

National Conference may refer to:

== Political reconstruction/political parties ==
=== India ===
- Jammu & Kashmir National Conference, the largest political party in Jammu and Kashmir, India
- Manipur National Conference, a political party in the Indian state of Manipur that was formed in 2002
- Indian National Conference, a national political party

=== Libya ===
- Libyan National Conference, for organising elections, a new constitution and peace in 2019 in Libya

== Sports ==
- Conference National, the top division of the Football Conference in England
- National Conference League, the top league in the pyramid of amateur rugby leagues run by the British Amateur Rugby League Association (BARLA)
- National Football Conference (NFC) in the National Football League
- National Conference in Arena Football League (1987–2008)
- National Conference in the North American Soccer League (1978–1980)
- National Conference (California), a U.S. high-school athletic conference

== See also ==
- MENC: The National Association for Music Education, an American organization for music educators
- National Conference on Undergraduate Research, an organization that promotes undergraduate research in universities throughout the United States
- National Conference of Bar Examiners, an American organization that develops standardized tests for lawyers
- National Conference of Synagogue Youth, an Orthodox Jewish youth group
- National Panhellenic Conference, an umbrella organization for 26 inter/national women's sororities in North America
- Conference
