= USS Congress =

USS Congress may refer to:

- USS Congress (1776), was a galley built on Lake Champlain, which served as flagship in the Battle of Valcour Island
- USS Congress (1777), was a 28-gun frigate built under authority of an act of the Second Continental Congress dated 13 December 1775
- USS Congress (1799), was a 38-gun sailing frigate launched in 1799 and in service periodically until she was broken up in 1834
- USS Congress (1841), was a 52-gun frigate launched in 1841 and destroyed by the ironclad CSS Virginia in 1862
- USS Congress (1868), was a screw sloop in commission from 1870 to 1876
- USS Congress (ID-3698), was a patrol vessel in commission from 1918 to 1919
- USS Congress (FFG-63), a proposed Constellation class guided missile frigate
