= Nelson Rockefeller's Dilemma =

2024 book

Nelson Rockefeller's Dilemma: The Fight to Save Moderate Republicanism
- Author: Marsha Barrett
- Language: English
- Published: 2024
- Publisher: Three Hills
- Publication place: United States
- Pages: 400

Nelson Rockefeller's Dilemma: The Fight to Save Moderate Republicanism is a 2024 book by Marsha Barrett. It analyses the decline of the strain of liberal Republicanism that New York governor Nelson Rockefeller represented.

The book is based on her PhD dissertation.
