= Congress Township =

Congress Township, may refer to:

- Congress Township, Morrow County, Ohio
- Congress Township, Wayne County, Ohio
