= Tauna S. Sisco =

American sociologist

Tauna Starbuck Sisco
- Education: Purdue University (BA, BS, MS, PhD)
- Occupations: Sociologist and educator
- Organization: St. Anselm College
- Known for: Political sociology, public policy

Tauna S. Sisco is an American sociologist and educator. She is a professor in the Jean School of Nursing & Health Sciences and the Department of Sociology & Social Work at Saint Anselm College, where she also serves as the program director for Community & Public Health. She specializes in political sociology, gender, and public policy.

== Education ==
Sisco was raised in Indiana, where she received the degrees of Bachelor of Arts, Bachelor of Science, Master of Science, and Doctor of Philosophy from Purdue University. She successfully defended and published her doctoral thesis detailing the relationship between homelessness, public policy, gender, and the media in January 2008.

== Public appearances and engagement ==
Beginning in the Fall of 2021, Sisco served as a co-chair of the search committee for a new Vice President of Academic Affairs (VPAA) at St. Anselm College. The search lasted for over six months, yielding a pool of over 50 applicants from which Dr. Sheila Adamus Liotta was selected to serve as the next VPAA at St. Anselm.

In October 2016, Sisco served on a panel at St. Anselm College addressing the complications of Catholic identity and civic engagement - particularly voting - in the context of the 2016 presidential election. She was joined by Associate Dean for Faculty Christy Gustafson and associate professor of politics, Fr. Benedict Guevin.

== Publications and awards ==
=== Awards ===
Sisco was presented with the Distinguished Faculty Award by the St. Anselm College chapter of the American Association of University Professors (AAUP) at the college's 2022 commencement ceremony.

=== Publications ===
- Editor. 2017. Races, Reforms, & Policy: Implications of the 2014 Midterm Elections. University of Akron Press.
- Editor. 2017. Political Communication & Strategy: Consequences of the 2014 Midterm Elections. University of Akron Press.
- Co-author. 2021. "The Politics of the 2018 Midterm Elections." Congress & the Presidency 48(1):1-7. Routledge.
- Author. 2017. "Gender and Policy Implementation: Analyzing and Predicting the Progress of Congressional Bills Targeting Homeless Women, 1977-1987." Journal of Women, Politics & Policy 38(3):385-408.
- Co-author. 2015. "'Flawed Vessels': Media Framing of Feminism in the 2008 Presidential Election." Feminist Media Studies 15(3):492-507.
- Author. 2018. "Adding Insult to Injury: (Mis)Treating Homeless Women in Our Mental Health System." Contemporary Sociology 47(2):191-192.
- Co-author. 2023. Identity Politics in National Elections. Palgrave Pivot.
- Co-author. 2019. "Effectiveness of an Electronic Nursing Intervention Post-Partum: A Randomized Control Trial." Journal of Advance Nursing 75(10):2223-2235.
- Co-author. 2017. Conventional Wisdom, Parties, and Broken Barriers in the 2016 Election. Lexington Books.
- Co-author. 2016. "New Hampshire Senate Race: Closest in the Nation." Roads to Congress 2016, eds. Foreman and Goodwin. Palgrave Macmillan.
- Co-author. 2014. "Unfriendly to Women? Female Politicians, Rape Comments, and the GOP in 2012." The American Election 2012: Contexts and Consequences, eds. Holder and Josephson. Palgrave Macmillan.
