= National Convention (disambiguation) =

The National Convention was the first republican legislative body of the French Revolution, that lasted from 21 September 1792 to 26 October 1795.

National convention may also refer to:

== Bolivia ==
- 1938 Bolivian National Convention, a defunct national legislature which promulgated the 12th Political Constitution of Bolivia

== Canada ==
- Newfoundland National Convention, a forum established to decide the constitutional future of Newfoundland

== Central African Republic ==
- National Convention (Central African Republic), a defunct political party

== Ghana ==
- People's National Convention (Ghana), a political party in Ghana

== Myanmar ==
- National Convention (Myanmar), 1993–1996 and 2004–2007 constituent assembly of Myanmar

== Namibia ==
- National Convention (Namibia), formed when the International Court of Justice ruled, in 1971, that South African rule in Namibia was illegal

== South Africa ==
- National Convention (South Africa) (1908–1909), which settled the terms of the Union of South Africa

== New Zealand ==
- New Zealand National Science Fiction Convention, a volunteer-run science fiction convention that is scheduled annually

== United Kingdom ==
- National Conservative Convention, the highest body of the voluntary wing of the Conservative Party
- National Pensioners Convention, an organisation representing old age pensioners

== United States ==
- United States presidential nominating convention, a quadrennial convention held by a political party to select candidates for high office in the United States
- Convention to propose amendments to the United States Constitution, one of two legal processes whereby the Constitution, may be altered.

=== National conventions of specific U.S. political parties ===
- National conventions of the Communist Party USA
- Constitution Party National Convention
- Democratic National Convention, the national convention of the Democratic Party
  - List of Democratic National Conventions
- Green National Convention, the national convention of the Green Party
- Libertarian National Convention, the national convention of the Libertarian Party
- Republican National Convention, the national convention of the Republican Party
  - List of Republican National Conventions
- Socialist Party of America
  - 1919 Emergency National Convention, a seminal gathering in the history of American radicalism, marked by the bolting of the party's organized left wing to establish the Communist Labor Party of America
- Whig National Conventions, the national convention of the Whig Party

== See also ==
- Convention (disambiguation)
- Political Convention
