= Congress of People's Deputies =

Congress of People's Deputies:

- Congress of Soviets of Workers', Soldiers' and Peasants' Deputies, sometimes shortened as Congress of People's Deputies
- Congress of People's Deputies of the Soviet Union
- Congress of People's Deputies of Russia
- Congress of People's Deputies (Russia, 2022)
- Congress of People's Deputies of the Dagestan Autonomous Soviet Socialist Republic

== See also ==
- Congress of Deputies (disambiguation)
