= Indian National Conference =

Indian conference sessions (1883–1885)

Indian National Union refers to a series of conference sessions generally considered to be the predecessor of Indian National Congress. Surendranath Banerjee and Anandamohan Bose were its main organisers. Two sessions of the conference were held in 1883 and 1885, and these sessions drew representatives from all major towns.

The first Indian National Union session was held in Kolkata at Albert Hall from 28 to 30 December 1883. It was prompted by Introduction of the Criminal Procedure Amendment Bill (1883–1884) or Ilbert Bill. Anandamohan Bose depicted this conference as the first stage towards the formation of a National Indian Parliament. The conference demanded introduction of representative assemblies for the advancement of the people of India.

The second Indian National Union was also held in Kolkata from 25 to 27 December 1885. Along with the Indian Association, the National Mohammadan Association and the British Indian Association were also conveners of this meeting. On its last day, the second National Conference sent a message of goodwill to the Indian National Congress.

As both of them have similarity with each other, the National Conference merged with the Indian National Congress in December 1886.
