= Clarence (given name) =

Clarence is a masculine given name. It was adopted as a first name from the Duke of Clarence, a title given to sons or younger brothers of English and British monarchs, which in turn derives from the estate name Honour of Clare. Its popularity as a first name increased in the second half of the 19th century in tribute to Prince Albert Victor, Duke of Clarence and Avondale, eldest son of Edward VII.

Notable people with the name include:

- Clarence 13X (1928–1969), American religious leader and the founder of the Five-Percent Nation
- Clarence Abbott (1888–1963), Australian rules football player
- Clarence Acuña (born 1975), Chilean professional footballer
- Clarence Adams (Korean War) (1929–1999), African-American GI during the Korean War, POW, and later a defector
- Clarence Alexander (born 1939), former Grand Chief of the Gwich'in of Alaska
- Clarence R. Allen (1925–2021), American geologist
- Clarence Applegran (1893–1960), American football player and basketball coach
- Clarence Ashley (1895–1967), American musician and singer
- Clarence Avant (1931–2023), American music executive and film producer
- Clarence Albert Bacote (1906–1981), American historian and activist
- Clarence Badger (1880–1964), American film director of feature films
- Clarence Bailey (1963–2006), American football player
- Clarence Bamberger (1886–1984), American mining executive, politician and philanthropist
- Clarence Barbour (1867–1937), American Baptist clergyman, educator, and the president of Brown University
- Clarence Barlow (1945–2023), British composer
- Clarence W. Barron (1855–1928), American financial editor and publisher who founded Barron's magazine
- Clarence Beavers (1921–2017), American United States Army sergeant and paratrooper
- Clarence Bell, several people
- Clarence Birdseye (1886–1956), pioneer of frozen food
- Clarence Addison Brimmer Jr. (1922–2014), American judge and politician
- Clarence Brooks (1896–1969), American actor
- Clarence Brown (disambiguation), several people
- Clarence Buckman (1851–1917), American farmer, lumberman, and politician
- Clarence Sinclair Bull (1896–June 8, 1979), American portrait photographer
- Clarence Burton (1882–1933), American actor
- Clarence G. Burton (1886–1982), American politician
- Clarence M. Burton (1853–1932), American lawyer, businessman, historian and philanthropist
- Clarence A. Buskirk (1842- 1926), American lawyer, politician, poet, and lecturer
- Clarence Campbell (1905–1984), Canadian ice hockey executive, referee, and soldier
- Clarence Thomas Campbell (1843–1922), Canadian physician, historian and politician
- Clarence Cannon (1879–1964), American politician
- Clarence Carnes (1927–1988), American fugitive
- Clarence Carter (1936–2026), blind US soul singer and musician
- Clarence Holbrook Carter (1904–2000), US painter
- Clarence E. Case (1877–1961), acting governor of New Jersey in 1920
- Clarence Chamberlin (1893–1976), American pioneer of aviation
- Clarence Clarity (born c. 1985), English singer, songwriter, producer, and musician
- Clarence Clark (1859-1937), American tennis player and banker
- Clarence Clemons (1942–2011), American musician, saxophonist for the E Street Band
- Clarence Coleman (baseball) (1884-????), American professional baseball catcher
- Clarence Coleridge (1930–2023), Guyanese-born American Episcopalian clergyman
- Clarence Linus Cory (1872–1937), American engineer and educator
- Clarence Cummings (born 2000), American Olympic weightlifter
- Clarence Darrow (1857–1938), American lawyer
- Clarence Dart (1920–2012), American World War II fighter pilot and member of the Tuskegee Airmen
- Clarence Delgado (born 2004), Filipino teen actor
- Clarence DeMar (1888–1958), American marathoner
- Clarence Dill (1884–1978), American politician
- Clarence Dixon (1955–2022), American murderer
- Clarence Day (1874–1935), American author and cartoonist
- Clarence Dillon (1882–1979), American financier and businessman
- Clarence Ditlow (1944–2016), was an American consumer advocate
- Clarence Dunlap (1908–2003), Canadian airman
- Clarence Dutton (1841–1912), American geologist and US Army officer
- Clarence Ransom Edwards (1859–1931), American general
- Clarence Edwards (1933–1993), American blues musician
- Clarence Ekstrom (1902–1986), naval aviator and vice admiral in the United States Navy
- Clarence Elkins (born 1963), American man who was wrongfully convicted of murder
- Clarence Emerson (1901–1963), merchant and political figure in New Brunswick, Canada
- Clarence Estey, (1917–1995) lawyer, judge, and political figure in Saskatchewan
- Clarence Fok, Hong Kong-Canadian film director and actor
- Clarence Gaines (1923–2005), American college basketball player and coach
- Clarence H. Geist (1866-1938), American public utilities magnate
- Clarence Geldart (1867–1935), American film actor
- Clarence Gillis (1895–1960), Canadian politician
- Clarence Gilyard (1955–2022), American university professor, actor and author
- Clarence Goodson (born 1982), US footballer
- Clarence Henry (boxer) (1926–1999), American boxer
- Clarence "Frogman" Henry (born 1937), American rhythm and blues singer and pianist
- Clarence Floyd Hirshfeld (1881–1939), American electrical, mechanical and consulting engineer, and educator
- Clarence Z. Hubbell (1869–1953), American architect
- Clarence Janecek (1911–1990), NFL player
- Clarence Jey, American record producer
- Clarence Johnson (1910–1990), American aeronautical engineer
- Clarence M. Kelley (1911–1997), American law enforcement officer, the Chief of the Kansas City Police Department in Kansas City, Missouri, and the second director of the Federal Bureau of Investigation
- Clarence King (1842–1901), American geologist, mountaineer, and author
- Clarence Kolster (1895–1972), American film editor
- Clarence Lam (born 1980), American politician and physician who has served in the Maryland Senate representing the 12th district since 2019
- Clarence F. Leary (1894–1918), American officer in the United States Navy during World War I
- Clarence P. LeMire (1886–1961), judge of the United States Tax Court
- Clarence Long (1908–1994), American politician
- Clarence Lung (1914–1993), American actor
- Clarence Mackay (1874–1938), American financier and philanthropist
- Clarence D. Martin (1886–1955), 11th Governor of the state of Washington
- Clarence R. Martin (1886–1972), Justice of the Indiana Supreme Court
- Clarence Edward Mathias (1876–1935), US Sergeant major, Medal of Honor recipient
- Clarence McNair (born 1977), American writer and entrepreneur
- Clarence Mitchell Jr. (1911–1984), an American civil rights activist and chief lobbyist for the NAACP for nearly 30 years
- Clarence Mitchell III (1939–2012), an American politician and son of Clarence Mitchell Jr.
- Clarence Mitchell IV (born 1962), an American radio cohost of The C4 And Bryan Nehman Show, former American politician, son of Clarence Mitchell III, and grandson of Clarence Mitchell Jr.
- Clarence Moore (disambiguation), several people
- Clarence Morley (1869–1948), American politician
- Clarence E. Mulford (1883–1956), American writer
- Clarence Nash (1904–1985), American voice actor
- Clarence Charles Newcomer (1923–2005), US District Judge of the United States District Court for the Eastern District of Pennsylvania
- Clarence Paul Oliver (1898–1991), American geneticist
- Clarence Page (born 1947), American journalist
- Clarence Palmer (born 1943), American jazz organist
- Clarence Paul (1928–1995), American songwriter and record producer
- Clarence Perry (1872–1944), American urban planner, sociologist, author, and educator
- Clarence J. Roberts (1873–1931), Justice of the New Mexico Supreme Court
- Clarence Ryan, Australian actor
- Clarence Sasser (1947–2024), American soldier and recipient of the Medal of Honor
- Clarence Saunders (athlete), Bermudian high jumper
- Clarence Saunders (grocer), American retailer, pioneer of supermarkets
- Clarence Scharbauer (1879–1942), American rancher
- Clarence Schmalz (1916–1981), Canadian ice hockey administrator
- Clarence Seedorf (born 1976), Dutch footballer
- Clarence Richard Silva (born 1949), American Catholic prelate
- Clarence Smith (disambiguation), several people
- Clarence A. Southerland (1889–1973), Chief Justice of the Delaware Supreme Court
- Clarence Stein (1882–1975), American urban planner, architect, and writer
- Clarence Stoner (1901–1994), American politician from Pennsylvania
- Clarence Swensen (1917–2009), American actor
- Clarence Thomas (born 1948), Associate Justice of the Supreme Court of the United States
- Clarence L. Townes Jr. (1928–2017), American businessperson, politician, civic activist
- Clarence J. A. Turner (1893–1957), American jockey
- Clarence W. Turner (1866–1939), American lawyer and politician
- Clarence Watters (1902−1986), American organist
- Clarence N. Weems Jr., American scholar and military officer
- Clarence White (1944–1973), American guitarist and singer
- Clarence Cameron White (1880–1960), American composer
- Clarence Hudson White (1871–1925), American photographer
- Clarence Whitehill (1871–1932), American opera singer
- Clarence Wijewardena, Sri Lankan guitarist and vocalist
- Clarence Williams III (1939–2021), American actor
- Clarence Wiseman (1907–1985), Canadian cleric, tenth general of The Salvation Army
- Clarence Woods (1888–1956), early American ragtime composer
- Clarence Zener (1905–1993), American physicist

== In fiction ==
- Clarence Odbody, a guardian angel from the 1946 film It's a Wonderful Life and 1990 film Clarence
- Clarence "Lumpy" Rutherford, a recurring character in the American TV series Leave It to Beaver
