= Clarence Moore =

Clarence Moore may refer to:

People

- Clarence Moore (American football) (born 1982), American professional football player
- Clarence Moore (baseball) (1908–1992), American baseball player
- Clarence Moore (businessman) (1865–1912), American businessman and first class passenger on the RMS Titanic
- Clarence Bloomfield Moore (1852–1936), American archaeologist
- Clarence C. Moore (1904–1979), engineer, inventor, and minister
- Clarence Lemuel Elisha Moore (1876–1931), American mathematics professor

Buildings

- Clarence B. Moore House, building in Philadelphia
- Clarence Moore House, Washington, D.C., building in Washington, D.C.
