= Poor Richard Club =

Historic private club in Pennsylvania

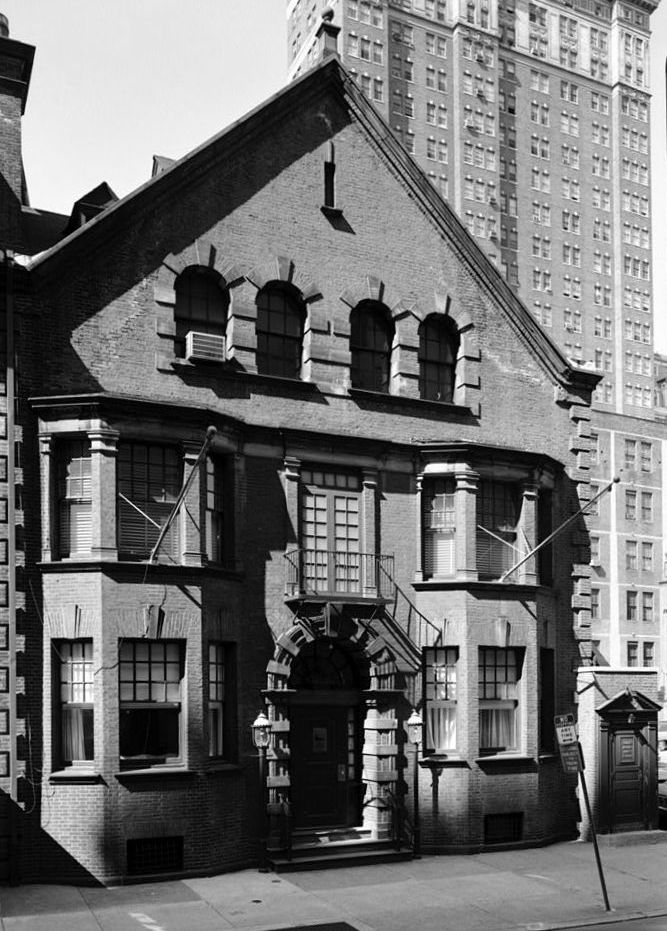
The second clubhouse at 1319 Locust Street

The Poor Richard Club was a private club in Philadelphia, Pennsylvania, whose members were mostly members of the advertising industry. The club bestowed an annual Gold Medal of Achievement to several celebrities, including several U.S. Presidents.

== History ==
The club was founded in 1906 with 75 members, just a year after a similar club opened in New York. The advertising industry was on a quest for more respectability, and the clubs were created as a way to promote and enforce ethical guidelines. Nevertheless, they functioned largely as places to nurture business, social, and political relationships. The first president was Thomas Martindale, a local grocer and importer.

The following year, the club purchased a large Victorian house at 239–241 Camac Street, where their weekly lunches and monthly dinners were held. By 1911, membership had grown to 350.

In 1916, the club published "Poor Richard's Dictionary of Philadelphia", an informative, sometimes humorous, guide to all aspects of the city, including historical landmarks, businesses, churches, hotels, hospitals, and clubs. The book was presented to Associated Advertising Clubs of the World members who attended the annual meeting held at the Poor Richard Club House.

In 1925, the club moved to the Dr. Joseph Leidy House, 1319 Locust Street, which they shared with the Charles Morris Price School of Advertising and Journalism, founded by members of the club in 1920.

The club was instrumental in proposing, funding, and raising the Benjamin Franklin National Memorial, built in 1933.

On January 17, 1956, the club held their 50th anniversary dinner at The Bellevue-Stratford Hotel and honored then Vice President Richard Nixon with the Gold Medal of Achievement. The club had over 600 members in the 1930s, but membership declined in the 1970s. The Locust Street building was sold in 1979, and the club disbanded a few years later.

== Gold Medal of Achievement awardees ==
The club's major event was its annual banquet, at which the members presented an annual award for public service. Among the recipients of the club's Gold Medal of Achievement were:

- William Howard Taft
- Woodrow Wilson
- Will Rogers
- Amelia Earhart
- Walt Disney, 1934
- Will Rogers, 1935
- Alfred P. Sloan, 1936
- Captain Eddie Rickenbacker, 1937
- Will H. Hays, 1938
- Colonel David Sarnoff, 1939
- Dr. Leo S. Rowe, 1940
- Walter D. Fuller, 1941
- Walter M. Dear, 1942
- Donald M. Nelson, 1943
- General H. H. Arnold, 1944
- Bob Hope, 1945
- Ted R. Gamble, 1946
- Robert McLean, 1947
- General Dwight D. Eisenhower, 1948
- Vladimir K. Zworykin, 1949
- Paul G. Hoffman, 1950
- Charles E. Wilson, 1951
- General Douglas MacArthur, 1952
- William S. Paley, 1953
- Henry Ford II, 1954
- Clare Boothe Luce, 1955
- Richard M. Nixon, 1956
- William B. Murphy, 1966
- Lee Iacocca, 1985
