= Clarence Weems =

Clarence Weems may refer to:

- Sonny Weems (Clarence Weems, born 1986), American basketball player
- Clarence N. Weems Jr. (1907–1996), American scholar of Korean studies and military officer
