= Thomas Martindale =

English-born American merchant, grocer (1845–1916)

- Thomas Martindale, c. 1897
- Born: 1845; County Durham, England
- Died: 1916 (aged 70–71); British Columbia, Canada
- Occupations: Merchant, grocer, tea importer, author, community leader, hunter
- Known for: Founder of an early natural foods store in the U.S., health food advocate, and promoter of physical exercise
- Spouse: Rosie Crum

Thomas Martindale (1845–1916) was an English-born American merchant, grocer, tea importer, and author. He founded Martindale and Johnson, the Thomas Martindale Company, and Martindale's Natural Markets, his stores are thought to be the first natural foods store in the United States. On his death, he was described as "probably the best known individual grocer in Philadelphia and one of the best known in the United States". He was an advocate of health foods and physical activity, who also supported infrastructure investments and innovations.

== Biography ==
Thomas Martindale was born in England in 1845 and emigrated to the United States with his family at the age of eight. He then spent some time in Canada.

Martindale founded a grocery store in Oil City, Pennsylvania in 1869. Some sources state he co-owned the first grocery store in Oil City in 1869, but then bought out his partner. Six years later he established a second store in Philadelphia. The store advertising included educational and instructional content. His grocery store operated as a retail establishment but also had a substantial wholesale business, including imported tea. In 1916, he was one of the largest importers of teas in the United States.

In 1883, Martindale teamed up with William Johnson to open a new grocery store called "Martindale and Johnson" in Philadelphia. They sold liquor in custom decorative whiskey jugs called "Hunter Jugs" produced for their business. Martindale and Johnson stopped producing the liquor jugs in 1920 during prohibition, and they are now collectibles.

Martindale served as the Poor Richard Club's first president, and was a founder of the Philadelphia Trades League. A Strawbridge and Clothier publishing department had published his book, Sport Royal, I Warrant You (1897) and the book was displayed amongst his "hunting trophies" in the department store window. Martindale was active in political issues facing grocers, such as a proposed bill requiring products be sold by weights and measures in 1911.

== Death and legacy ==
Martindale died on a hunting expedition in British Columbia. His body was returned to Philadelphia and buried in Westminster Cemetery.

A Martindale's Natural Market store in Springfield, Pennsylvania was founded in 1971, and continued in existence as of 2021. The Martindale family maintained a presence at the store until 1991.

Martindale's former home at 413–415 33rd Street in Philadelphia is listed as part of the Powelton Historic District by the National Register of Historic Places since 1985.

== Publications ==
- Martindale, Thomas; Wiman, Erastus; Haupt, Lewis M. (1892). The Proposed Ship Canal Between Philadelphia and New York (Via Trenton). New York: New York Board of Trade and Transportation.
- Martindale, Thomas (1897). Sport Royal, I Warrant You!—Twelfth Night. Philadelphia: H. W. Shaw Co. Reprint: ISBN 0665098472.
- Martindale, Thomas (1901). Sport Indeed. Philadelphia: G. W. Jacobs & Co.
- Martindale, Thomas (1910). With Gun and Guide. Philadelphia: G. W. Jacobs and Company.
- Martindale, Thomas (1913). Hunting in the Upper Yukon. G.W. Jacobs & Co.
- Martindale, Thomas (1919). Sport Indeed. Toronto, ON: Musson. Reprint: ISBN 066575146X.

== See also ==
- British colonization of the Americas
- Deer Creek Township, Miami County, Indiana
