= Clarence Brown (disambiguation) =

Clarence Brown (1890–1987) was an American film director.

Clarence Brown may also refer to:

- Clarence J. Brown (1893–1965), Ohio congressman
- Bud Brown (politician) (1927–2022), Ohio congressman, son and successor to the above
- Clancy Brown (born 1959), American actor and voice actor, grandson and son to the above
- Clarence Brown (baseball), Negro league baseball player
- Clarence John Brown (1895–1973), U.S. Navy Vice Admiral
- Clarence "Gatemouth" Brown (1924–2005), American R&B singer
- Clarence Brown (scholar) (1929–2015), professor of Russian literature and comparative literature from Princeton University
