= Dr. Joseph Leidy House =

Historic house in Pennsylvania, United States

- U.S. National Register of Historic Places
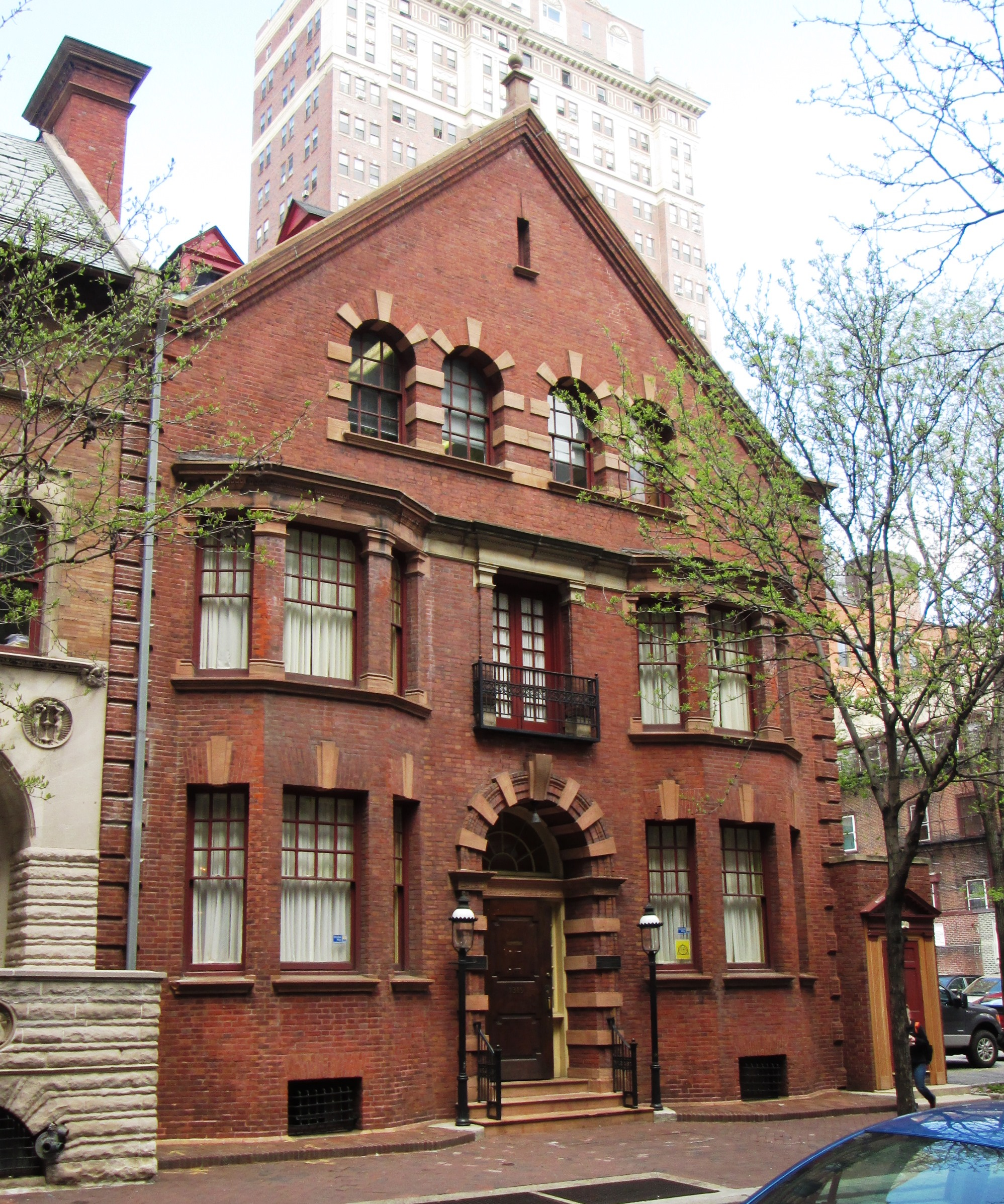
- The Dr. Joseph Leidy House at 1319 Locust Street in Philadelphia in 2013

- Location within Philadelphia Location within Pennsylvania Location within the United States
- Location: 1319 Locust Street, Philadelphia, Pennsylvania
- Coordinates: 39°56′52″N 75°9′50″W
- Built: 1893
- Architect: Wilson Eyre, Jr. G. Edwin Brumbaugh
- Architectural style: Colonial Revival
- NRHP reference No.: 80003613
- Added to NRHP: December 04, 1980

The Dr. Joseph Leidy House is a historic residence located at 1319 Locust Street between S. 13th and S. Juniper Streets in the Washington Square West neighborhood of Philadelphia, Pennsylvania. It was built in 1893 and 1894 and was designed in the Georgian style by architect Wilson Eyre to be the home of Joseph Leidy, Jr., the nephew of Joseph Leidy (1823–1891), a noted American paleontologist. The house is next door to the Clarence B. Moore House, which was designed by Eyre in 1890.

From 1925 to 1979, the Leidy House served as the clubhouse of the now-defunct Poor Richard Club, whose members worked in advertising, and with the Moore House next door, was part of the Charles Morris Price School of Advertising and Journalism. Currently, it is the headquarters of District 1199C, the National Union of Hospital and Health Care Employees.

The house was added to the National Register of Historic Places in 1980.

== See also ==
- National Register of Historic Places listings in Center City, Philadelphia
