= Health food store =

Food store emphasizing healthful products

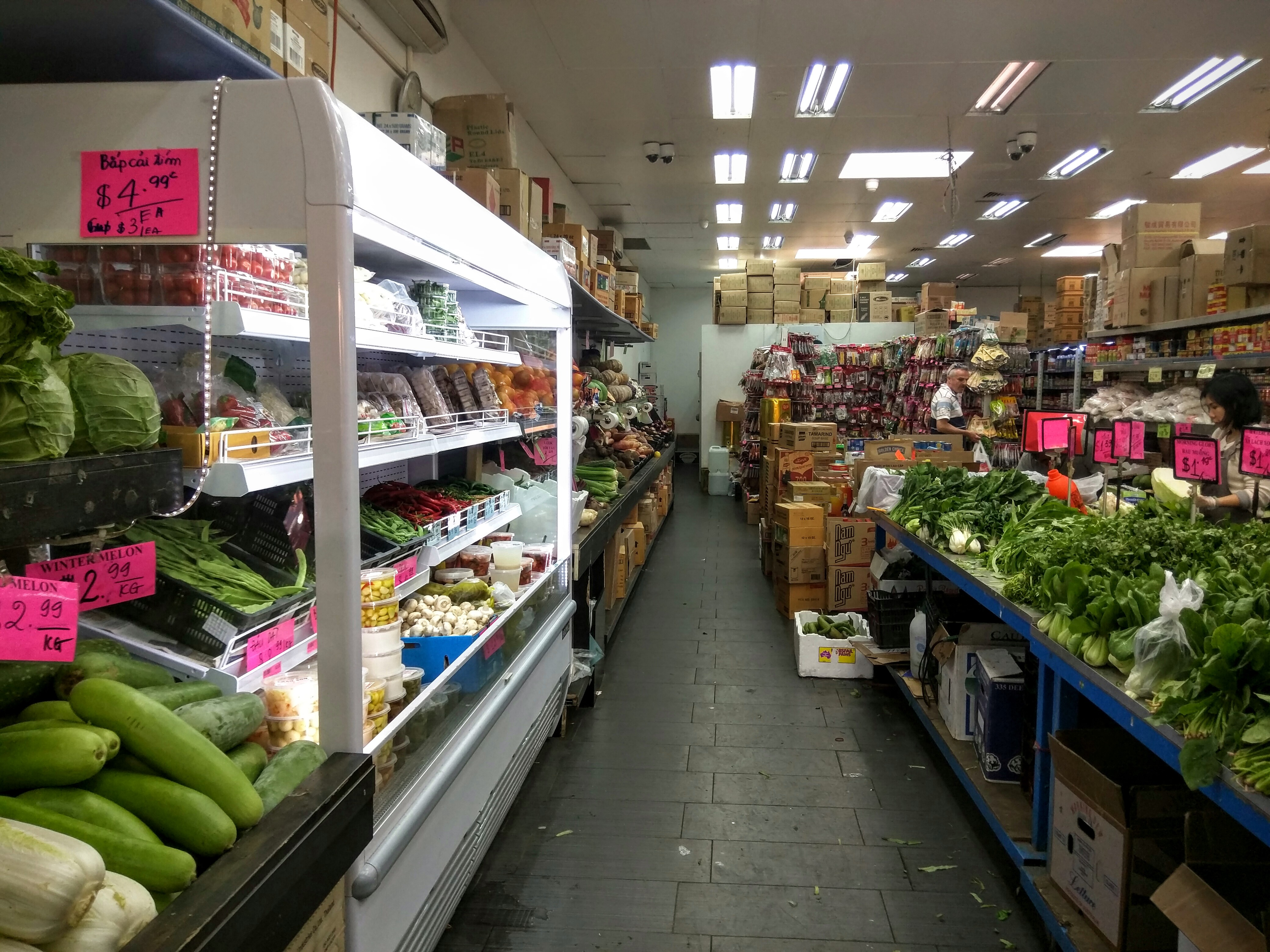
Produce is often emphasized, as at this store in New South Wales.

A health food store (or health food shop) is a type of grocery store that primarily sells healthful foods, organic foods, local produce, and often nutritional supplements. Health food stores typically offer a wider or more specialized selection of foods than conventional grocery stores for their customers, for example people with special dietary needs, such as people who are allergic to the gluten in wheat or some other substance, and for people who observe vegetarian, vegan, raw food, organic, or other alternative diets.

== Health food ==
The term health food has been used since the 1920s to refer to specific foods claimed to be especially beneficial to health, although the term has no official definition. Some terms that are associated with health food are macrobiotics, natural foods, organic foods and whole foods. Macrobiotics is a diet focusing primarily on whole cereals. Whole cereals, along with other whole foods, are foods that are minimally processed. Whole cereals have their fiber, germ and hull intact and are considered more nutritious. Natural foods are simply foods that contain no artificial ingredients. Organic foods are foods that are grown without the use of conventional and artificial pesticides and must meet certain organic standards.

== Nutritional supplements ==
Most health food stores also sell dietary supplements, such as vitamins, herbal supplements, and homeopathic remedies. Herbal supplements had never been regulated until the European Directive on Traditional Herbal Medicinal Products came into force on 30 April 2004. The Traditional Herbal Medicinal Products Directive, 2004/24/EC, was established to provide a regulatory approval process for herbal medicines in the European Union (EU).

== History ==
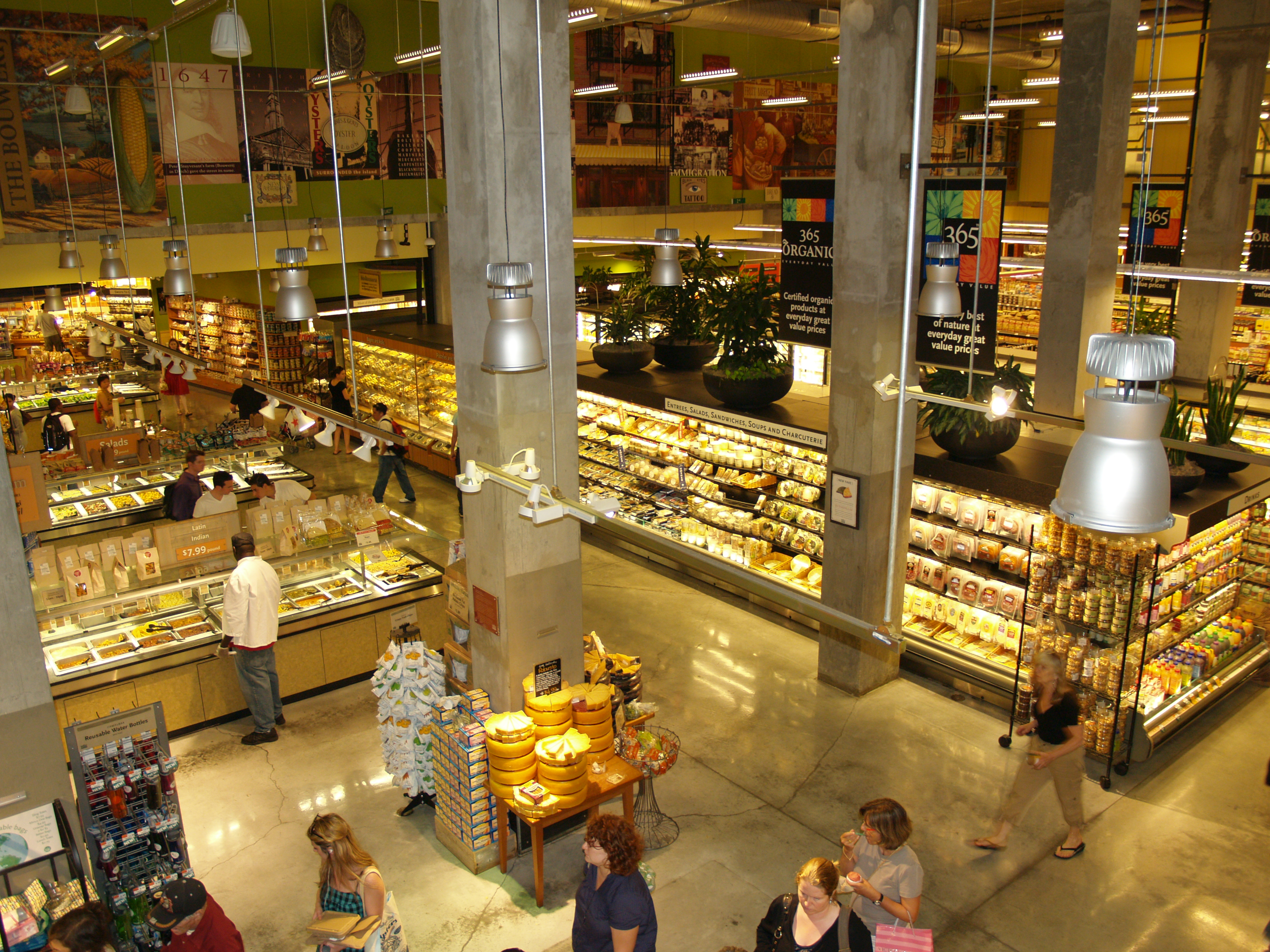
Whole Foods Market has brought large, multi-national corporate buying power to the health food store industry.

One of the early health food stores, Thomas Martindale Company, is thought to have been founded in 1869 by English immigrant Thomas Martindale in Oil City, Pennsylvania. Martindale advocated for healthy living and physical exercise through education and a series of books he authored. In the 1920s and 1930s health food stores gained popularity.

Health food stores in the United States became more common in the 1960s.

== See also ==
- Bulk foods, a feature of some health food stores
- Health promotion, political aspects in lifestyle changes
- Lifestyle medicine, preventive healthcare based on lifestyle changes
- Reformhaus, a health food store in German-speaking Europe
- Specialty food, food made from high-quality ingredients
