= Clarence Moore (businessman) =

American businessman (1865–1912)

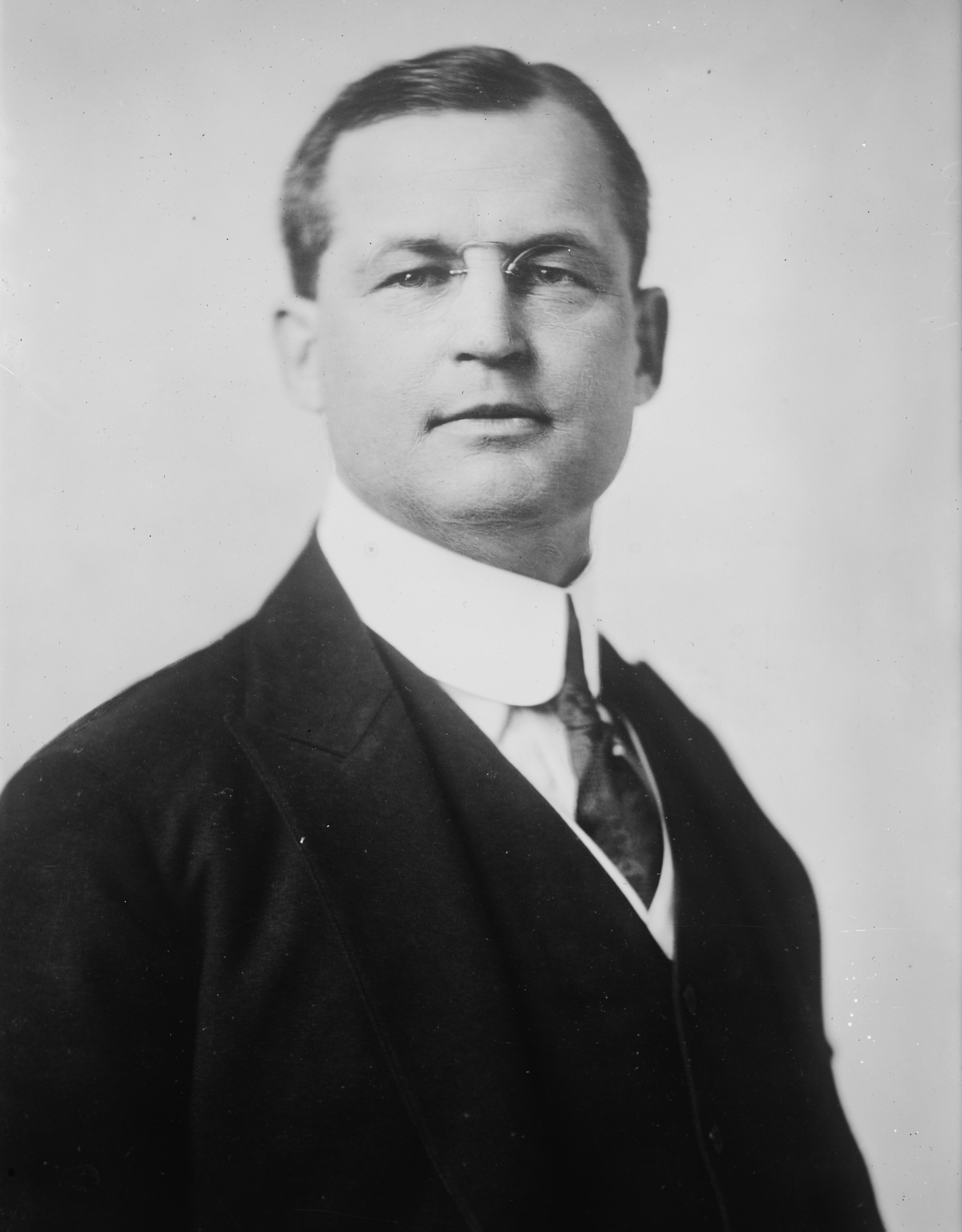
- Born: March 1, 1865; Clarksburg, West Virginia, U.S.
- Died: April 15, 1912 (aged 47); Atlantic Ocean
- Education: Dufferin College, London, Ontario
- Occupation: Businessman
- Spouses: Alice McLaughlin (died 1897); Mabelle Swift (m. 1900)
- Children: 6

Clarence Moore (March 1, 1865 – April 15, 1912) was a prominent American businessman and sportsman. In 1909, he built a large home in Washington, D.C. that now serves as an embassy of Uzbekistan. Moore died after a leisure trip to England, on his way home as a first class passenger on the RMS Titanic when it sank in the North Atlantic.

== Early life and ancestors ==
Moore was born in Clarksburg, West Virginia, in 1865 to Jasper Yates Moore (1834–1907), a legal clerk, and Frances Elizabeth Reynolds (1842–1894), both of Virginia. Younger brother Frank Reynolds Moore (1869–1954) joined the family four years later and they lived in Harrison County, West Virginia, into the 1880s. Moore had a private school education, then attended and graduated from Dufferin College in London, Ontario. Moore's great-great-grandfather, Mordecai Moore, came to America from England in 1732 as Lord Baltimore Charles Calvert's private physician. Mordecai's son, Samuel Preston Moore, moved from Anne Arundel County, Maryland, to Harrison County in about 1802.

== Business career ==
Soon after his education, Moore explored and developed properties in West Virginia for coal mining, oil, and timber, partnering with Stephen Benton Elkins and Henry Gassaway Davis. In September 1888, he accompanied T.C. Crawford of the New York World and John B. Floyd to visit Devil Anse Hatfield in Logan County, West Virginia. He moved to Washington, D.C., in 1890 and began working for the William B. Hibbs & Co. brokerage firm in 1891, for which he received an annual salary in 1910 of $25,000, equivalent to $864,000 in 2025. Moore raised cattle and horses on farmland he owned in Montgomery County, Maryland, and had some real estate investments near Leesburg, Virginia.

== Sportsman and social activity ==
Considered among the top equestrians in the Washington area, Moore played an integral part in starting the Chevy Chase fox hunting club, and was later a master of foxhounds for the Loudoun Hunt in Loudoun County, Virginia.

Moore was a member of various private social clubs, including the Metropolitan, Chevy Chase, and Alibi clubs in Washington, as well as the New York Yacht Club in New York City and Travelers Club in Paris.

== RMS Titanic fate ==
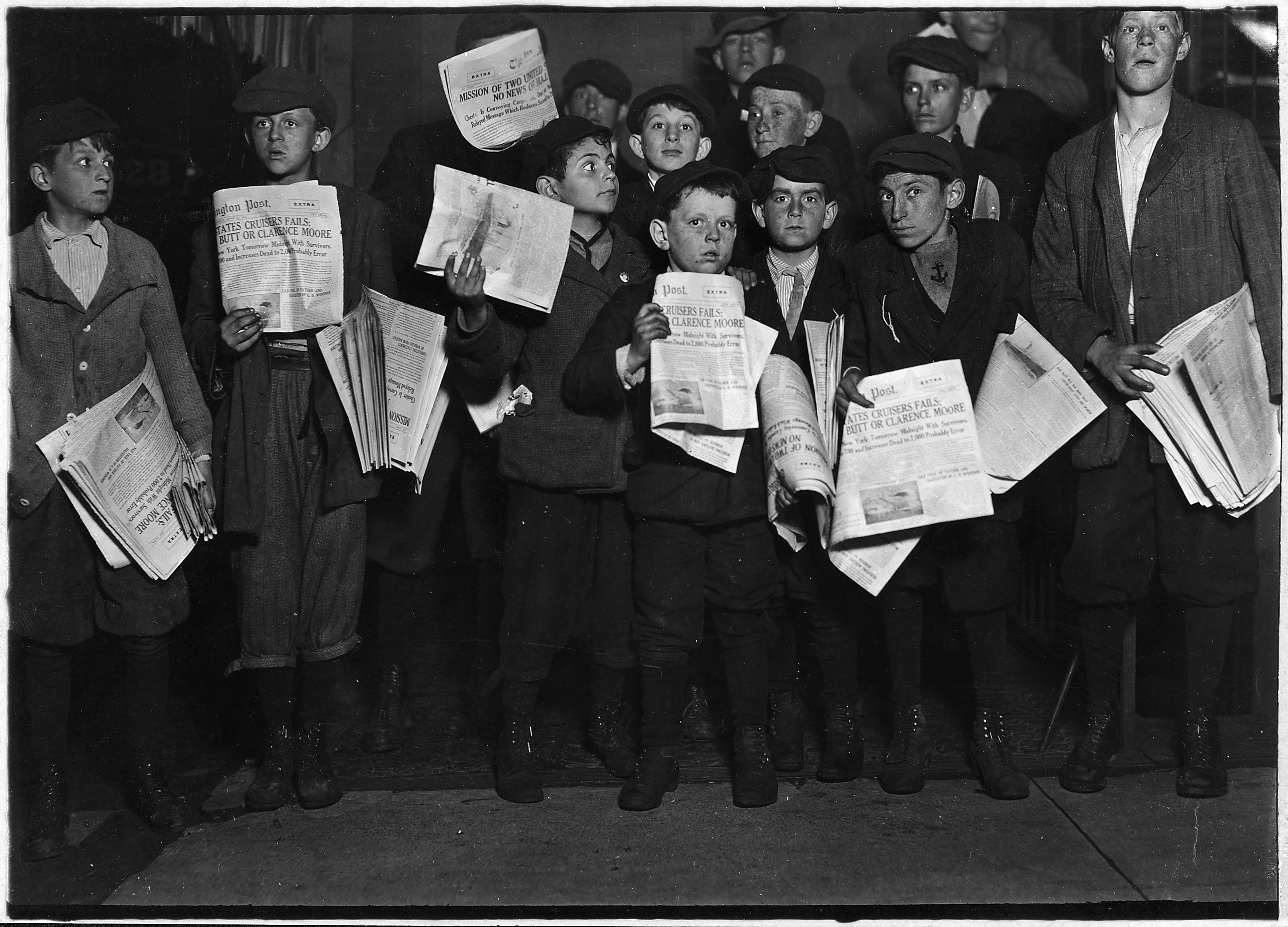
April 17, 1912 Washington Post headline: "No News of Major Butt or Clarence Moore"

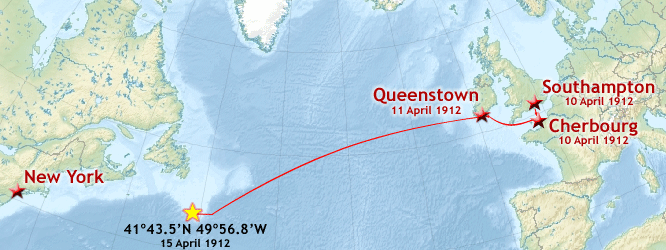
Titanic's voyage

Moore left Washington in mid-March 1912 for what his wife said was a pleasure trip to England. The main purpose of his trip was to find and buy English Foxhounds for the Loudoun Hunt. While there, he also attended the Grand National horse race. Moore bought 50 pairs (100) of the dogs and booked first class travel back to the U.S. for himself and his English manservant, Charles Henry Harrington. They boarded the RMS Titanic on April 10 at Southampton with ticket number 113769 at a cost of £42, 8s, equivalent to £4,190 in 2025, or about $5,740. Moore had originally planned to transport the dogs with him on the Titanic, though ultimately made other arrangements for them.

According to survivor accounts, on the night of the ship's iceberg collision and sinking, Moore was playing cards in the smoking room with his dining companions and fellow Americans, Major Archibald Butt, Harry Elkins Widener, and William Carter (husband of Lucile). Among the stories Moore told that evening was how he had helped a newspaper reporter interview Anse Hatfield, the patriarch on one side of the infamous Hatfield–McCoy feud. According to Col. Archibald Gracie IV, at around 2:00AM, Clarence Moore, along with friends Major Archibald Butt, painter Francis Millet, and lawyer Arthur L. Ryerson returned to their usual table in the First-Class Smoking Lounge and played a final hand of cards before shaking hands and departing. The Washington Times wrote that Moore and Butt, who was also from Washington, remained together until jumping into the water as the ship went down. Their bodies were never recovered. Moore's employer and business associate, William B. Hibbs, went to New York, where many survivors were taken by the RMS Carpathia, and Brigadier General Edwards went to the White House at Moore's wife's pleading, though no additional information was available.

== Personal life and legacy ==
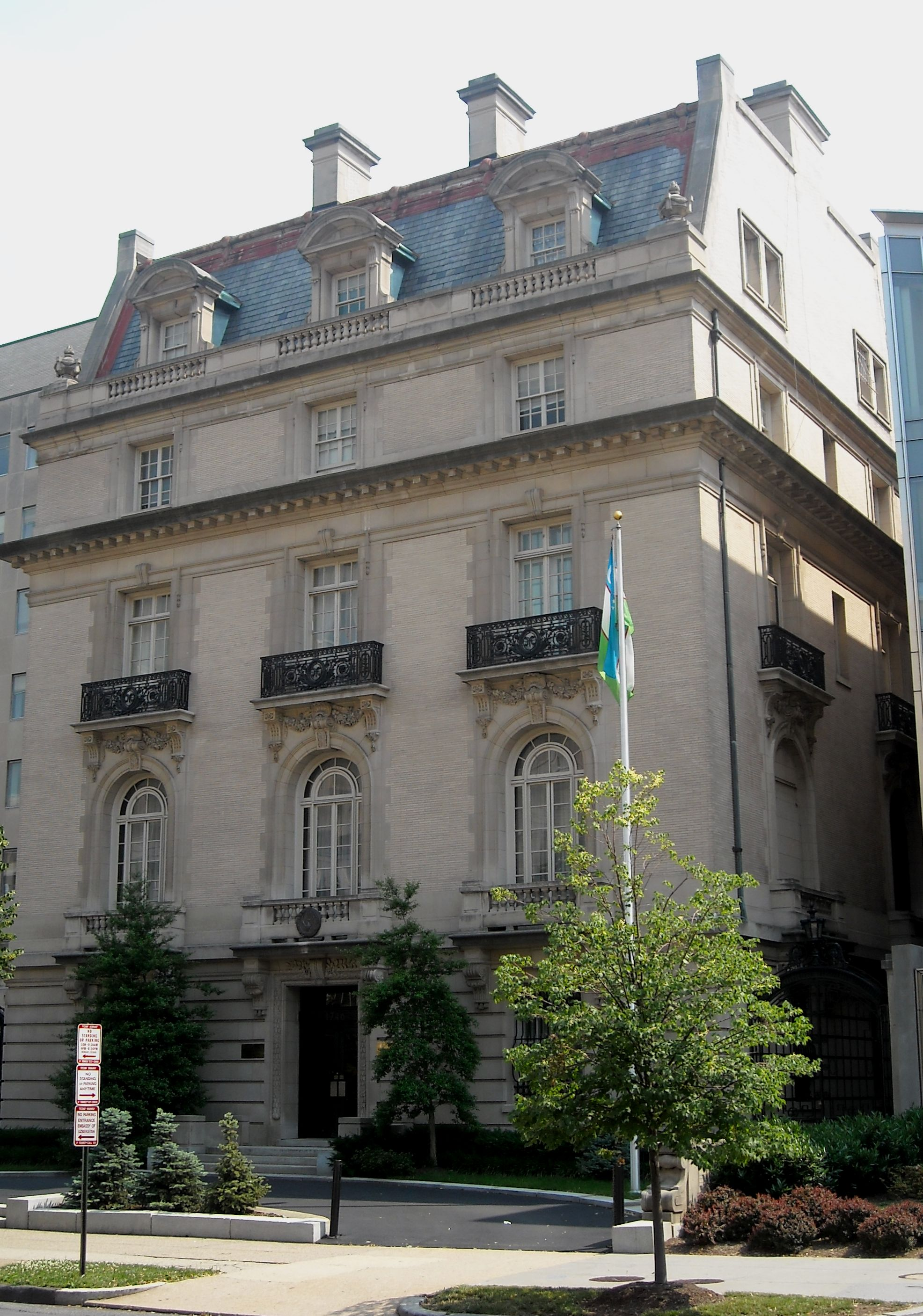
Clarence Moore House, Washington, D.C., 2008

Moore's first wife, Alice McLaughlin (1872–1897), was the daughter of Frank McLaughlin, former owner of the Philadelphia Times. She gave birth to two children, and died 12 days after bearing the second:

- Frances Sarah Preston, September 14, 1894 – early October 1921, who married Henri Marquisan and died in Paris, and
- Samuel Preston, born July 5, 1897.

Moore married again on June 20, 1900, in Beverly, Massachusetts, to Mabelle Florence Swift (1878–1933), daughter and heiress of Chicago meat packer Edwin C. Swift (a brother of Swift & Company founder Gustavus). The couple had four more children, the first of whom died young:

- Edwin Swift, November 25, 1901 – January 11, 1907 (aged 5),
- Jasper, November 30, 1905 – 1969, in Duncan, British Columbia,
- Clarence Jr, born January 20, 1910, who attended Eton and Harvard and married Joan Ashton Lindsley on December 28, 1932, and
- Lloyd, born November 29, 1911, who married and was divorced from Eppes Bartow Preston (née Hawes; 1901–1981), daughter of U.S. senator Harry B. Hawes.

Moore asked architects Jules Henri de Sibour and Bruce Price in 1906 to design a mansion for his family on land his wife had bought in 1901. Known as the Clarence Moore House, its construction was completed at 1746 Massachusetts Avenue NW in 1909. Moore died three years later and his widow remarried in 1915 to Danish immigrant Aksel C.P. Wichfeld, a year before he was appointed to the Danish legation, afterward only using the mansion for diplomatic and social events. She sold the property to the Government of Canada in 1927, after which it was used as a Canadian chancery and embassy. Canada relocated their embassy to another property, officially opened in 1989, and sold the Massachusetts Avenue property in 1996 to the government of Uzbekistan, which also uses it as an embassy.

Though often cited as having the middle name "Bloomfield", Moore's birth, census, and passport records do not include a middle name. When his daughter was born in 1894, her father's name was listed as "Clarence Samuel Preston Moore". His name may have later been confused with that of another famous American of his time, archaeologist Clarence Bloomfield Moore (1852–1936).
