= Clarence Smith =

Clarence Smith may refer to:

== Sportspeople ==
- Clarence Smith (baseball), Negro leagues player, 1921–1933
- Clarence Smith (soccer), American soccer player
- Pop-Boy Smith (Clarence Ossie Smith, 1892–1924), Major League Baseball pitcher
- Clarence Smith (cricketer) (1902–1982), South African cricketer

== Musicians ==
- Sonny Rhodes (Clarence Smith, 1940–2021), blues singer and guitarist
- Pinetop Smith (Clarence Smith, 1904–1929), jazz pianist

== Politicians ==
- Clarence Smith (politician) (1849–1941), British member of parliament for Kingston upon Hull East, 1892–1895
- Clarence W. Smith (1855–1937), American lawyer, judge, and politician from New York
- Clarence C. Smith (1883–1983), American farmer, politician, and businessman from New York

== Other people ==
- Clarence Herbert Smith (1865–1901), Australian agriculturalist, engineer, blacksmith and inventor
- Clarence L. Smith (1894–1951), American architect
- Clarence O. Smith (1931–2025), American media executive and co-founder of Essence magazine
- Clarence 13X (Clarence Smith, 1928–1969), founder of the Five Percent Nation
- Clarence A. Smith, director of the Centers for Disease Control and Prevention

== See also ==
- William Gervase Clarence-Smith, British economic historian
