= Emily Ryerson =

American first-class passenger who survived the sinking of RMS Titanic

- Born: Emily Maria Borie; August 10, 1863; Philadelphia, Pennsylvania, U.S.
- Died: December 28, 1939 (aged 76); Cooperstown, New York, U.S.
- Resting place: Lakewood Cemetery; Cooperstown, New York, U.S.
- Spouse: Arthur Larned Ryerson (m. 1889–1912) William Forsythe Sherfesee (m. 1927)
- Children: 5: Suzette, Arthur Jr., Emily Ryerson, Ellen Ryerson, Jack Ryerson

Emily Maria Borie Ryerson (August 10, 1863 – December 28, 1939) was an American first-class passenger who survived the sinking of RMS Titanic on April 15, 1912.

== Early life and family ==
Emily married Arthur Larned Ryerson on January 31, 1889. Born on 12 January 1851 in Chicago, he was the son of Joseph Turner Ryerson, founder of the iron and steel company Joseph T. Ryerson & Co. His mother was Ellen Griffin Larned. He and Emily had five children: Susan "Suzette" Parker Ryerson (August 3, 1890 – January 13, 1921), Arthur Larned Ryerson Jr. (November 19, 1891 – April 8, 1912), Emily Borie Ryerson (October 8, 1893 – June 25, 1960), Ellen Ashfordbye Ryerson (February 16, 1895 – February 2, 1973), and John Borie "Jack" Ryerson (December 16, 1898 – January 21, 1986). Arthur, who later served as president of his father's firm, studied law and graduated from Yale in 1871. He went on to practice law and became a partner in the law firm of Isham, Lincoln & Ryerson in Chicago. He also served as the president of St. Luke's Hospital.

The family moved from Chicago to Otsego Lake, New York due to Arthur's health.

Daughter Emily Borie Ryerson married George Hyde Clarke of Hyde Hall. They, who lived on a large estate near Cooperstown, New York, had seven children before divorcing.

== RMS Titanic ==
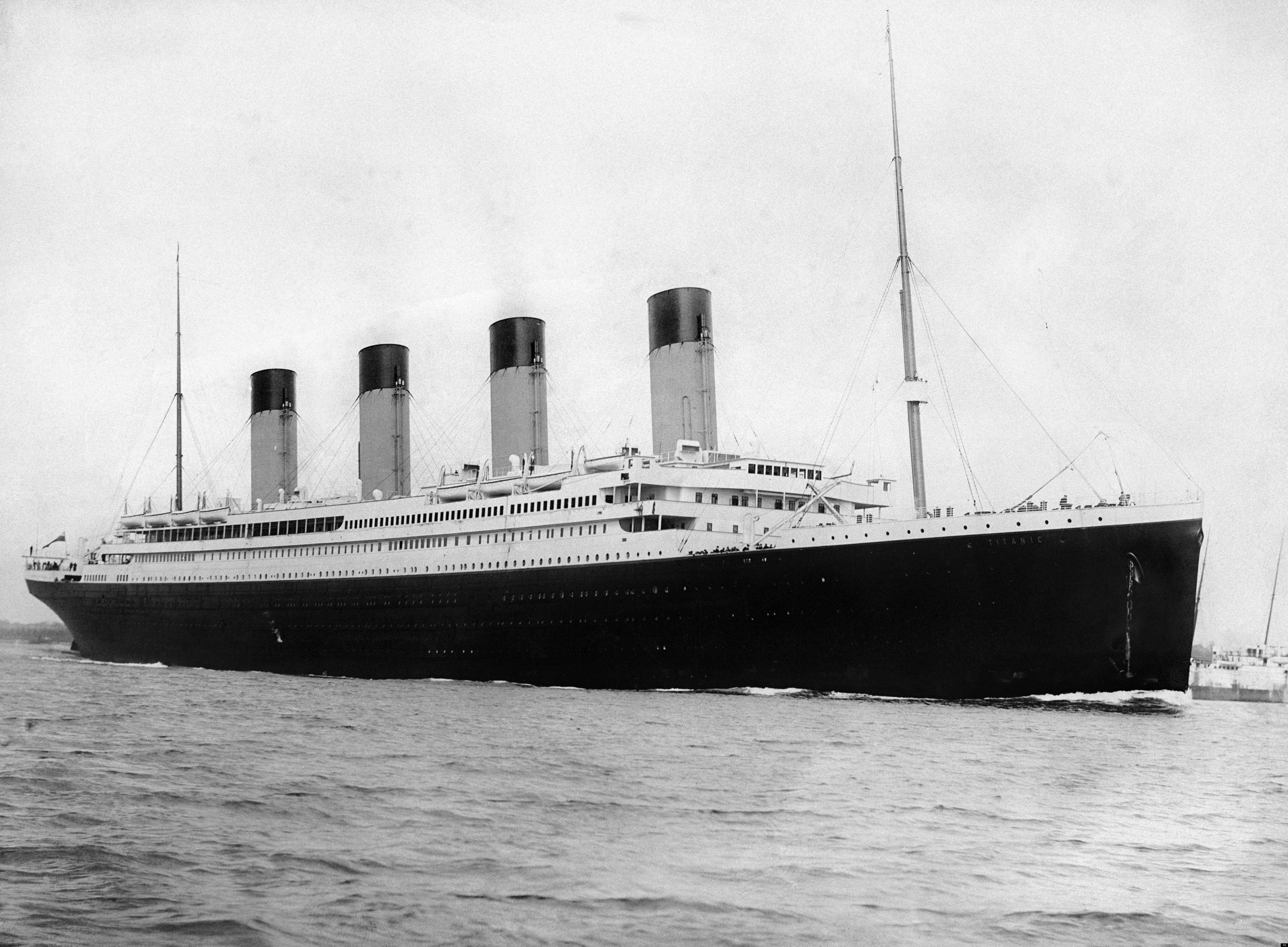
RMS Titanic departing Southampton on 10 April 1912.

In spring 1912, Arthur took Ryerson, Suzette, Emily, and John on a vacation to France and stayed in a house in Versailles. However, their holiday was cut short when they received the news that their oldest son and Yale student, Arthur Jr., had died in a car accident on 8 April 1912 in Bryn Mawr, Pennsylvania. Arthur immediately ended the vacation and booked first-class passage for himself, Ryerson, Suzette, Emily, and John on the first America bound steamer he could find. He booked ticket number 17608 at the cost of £262 7s 6d on the RMS Titanic, which was to set out on its maiden voyage. They boarded the ship in Cherbourg, France on 10 April 1912. Ryerson also brought her maid, Victorine Chaudanson and their youngest son's governess, Grace Scott Bowen, on board. The group occupied first class cabins B57, B63 and B66.

On the afternoon of April 14, 1912, fellow passenger Marian Longstreth Thayer invited Ryerson for a walk. It was the first time she had been on the boat deck in public. After nearly an hour they settled into deck chairs outside the aft staircase of 'A' deck to watch the sunset. White Star official, J. Bruce Ismay, joined them and told them about the ice warning from the Baltic. At 11:40 pm, the ship struck an iceberg and began to sink. Ryerson was awake when the ship hit the iceberg. She woke Arthur, Suzette, Emily, John, Grace, and Victorine.

"[The maid's] door was locked and I had some difficulty in waking her. By this time my husband was fully dressed, and we could hear the noise of feet tramping on the deck overhead. He was quite calm and cheerful and helped me put the lifebelts on the children and on my maid. I was paralyzed with fear of not all getting on deck together in time, as there were seven of us. I would not let my younger daughter, [Emily], dress, but she only put on a fur coat, as I did over her nightgown."

Ryerson and her family went to 'A' deck, where the lifeboats were being prepared to be launched, and stood there for "fully half an hour". She, Suzette, Emily, Victorine, and Grace stepped into Lifeboat 4 at 1:50am. John was initially not allowed in, however, Arthur stepped forward and told Second Officer Charles Lightoller (who was loading the boat): "Of course, that boy goes with his mother. He is only 13." After this, he was allowed to join his family but Arthur had to stay behind.

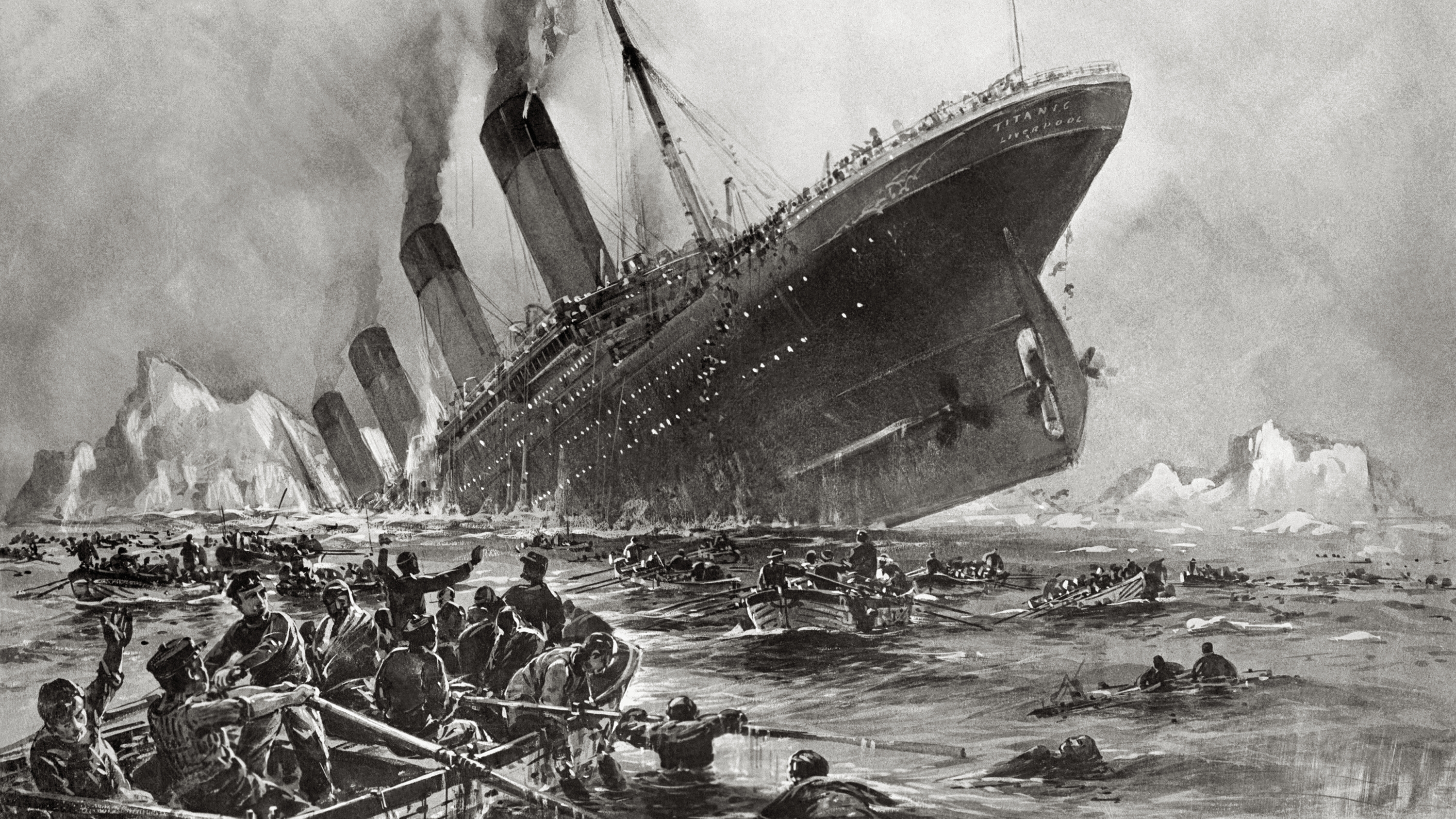
Titanic sinking on 15 April 1912.

After his family had safely departed in the lifeboat, Arthur headed for the First-Class smoking room. He was seen there by Archibald Gracie IV at 2am playing cards with Clarence Moore, Major Archibald Butt, and Francis Millet at their usual table. After they finished their game, they all shook hands and departed back to the boat deck. The ship sank by 2:20 am and Arthur perished in the icy water that night along with 1,500 other people, including 117 other first-class male passengers. His body, if recovered, was never identified. A memorial was set up alongside the graves of Emily and their children in Lakewood Cemetery in Cooperstown, New York.

While in the lifeboat, Ryerson witnessed the ship break in half. She, Suzette, Emily, John, Grace, and Victorine were rescued by the RMS Carpathia at about 8am on the 15th and taken to New York City on the 18th.

== Later life ==
Ryerson was bestowed a Croix de Guerre medal for her wartime charity work.

Ryerson designed and built the Ryerson mansion at 2700 Lakeview Ave in Lincoln Park, Chicago, in 1917.

In the 1920s while traveling through China, Ryerson met William Forsythe Sherfesee, who was the Forestry Advisor to the Chinese Government and later was appointed Advisor to the Ministry of Finance. He was also a graduate of Yale University and was 18 years her junior. He was the son of Heinrich "Louis" Sherfesee and Annie Griffith Sherfesee.

The accounts of Forsythe trying to get from Peking to Chicago in the early weeks of December 1927 made the newspapers worldwide. In the attempt to get him to Chicago during a blizzard, he traveled by boat, train, then finally by private plane, which Ryerson had sent to bring him to Chicago. He did not arrive on time, and they held the wedding on December 9, 1927. They went to Italy and Persia for their honeymoon. They traveled throughout their marriage, and settled in Saint- Jean-Cap-Ferrat on the French Riviera where they built Villa Bontoc. Their next door neighbor was the noted author and playwright, Somerset Maugham.

In December 1939 while in Hawaii, Ryerson fell and broke her hip, but insisted on continuing the trip. In Uruguay she suffered a fatal heart attack and died on December 28, 1939. She was buried in Lakewood Cemetery in Cooperstown, New York.

== Media portrayals of Arthur ==
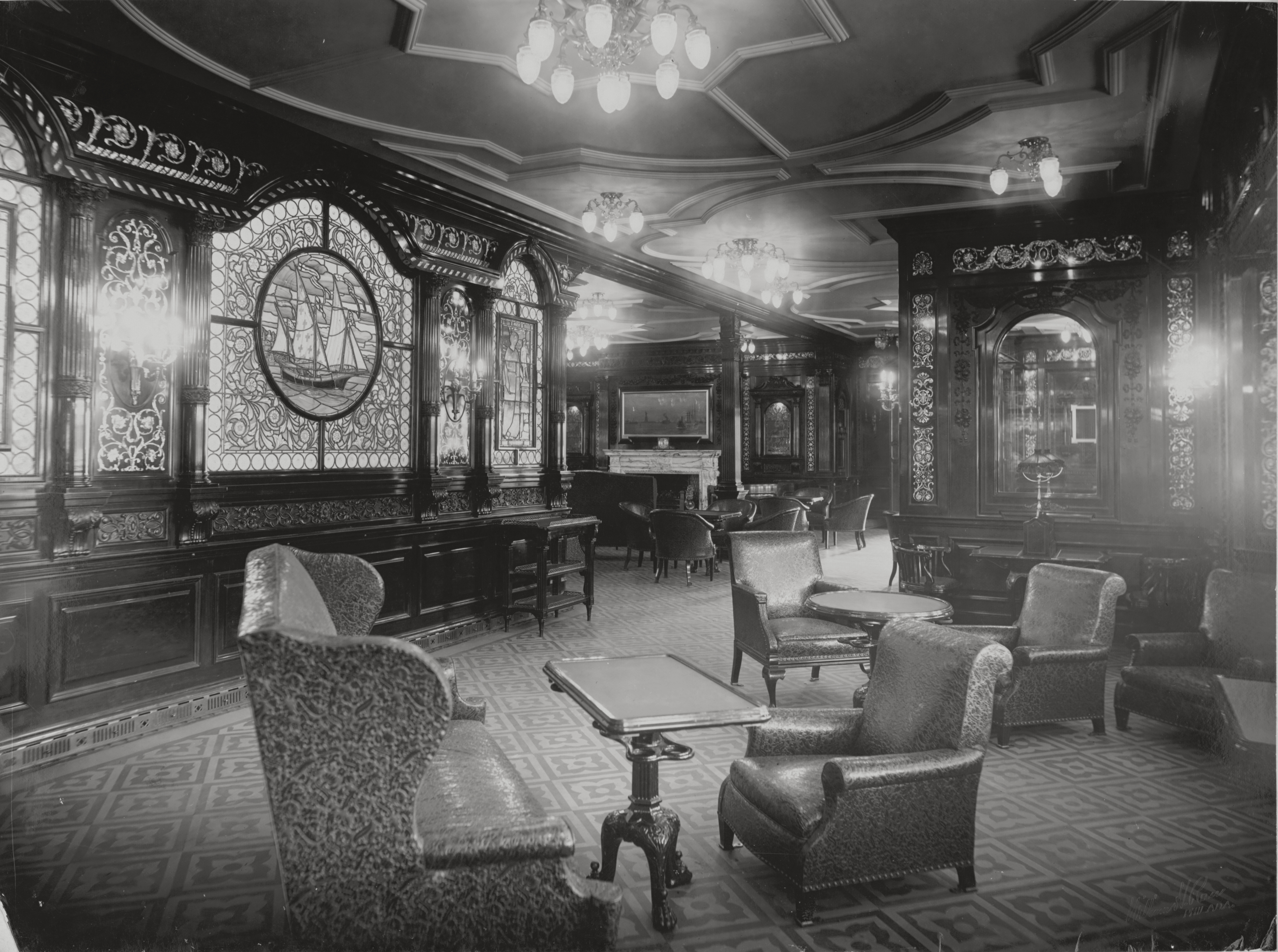
The First-Class Smoking Room (pictured here on the Olympic), where Arthur was last seen.

=== A Night to Remember (1958) ===
Arthur was portrayed by Stuart Nicholl in the 1958 movie A Night to Remember. His altercation with Second Officer Lightoller about John not being allowed in the lifeboat was featured in it.

=== Titanic (1997) ===
In the 1997 James Cameron movie Titanic, Arthur can be spotted as a background character and is mentioned by name after Spicer Lovejoy (David Warner) discovers that Jack Dawson (Leonardo DiCaprio) had stolen Arthur's jacket earlier in the movie in order to disguise himself.

== Portrayals ==
- Valerie Cossart (1956) - Kraft Television Theatre: Season 9: Episode 25: A Night to Remember
