= Clarence Thomas Campbell =

Canadian physician and politician (1843–1922)

Clarence Thomas Campbell (December 27, 1843 – 1922) was a physician, historian and politician in Ontario, Canada. He served as mayor of London in 1905.

The son of Thomas Campbell, a native of Ireland who was of Scottish descent, he was born in London and was educated there, going on to study medicine at the Cleveland Western Medical College and the Homeopathic College of Philadelphia. In 1886, he set up practice in London. In 1906, Campbell was named inspector of post offices for London division. He served on London city council from 1901 to 1903. He was also chair of the school board and of the local board of health. He was a long-time member of the Medical Council of Ontario, also serving as its president. He was also a member of the medical staff of the Victoria Hospital. He was also a member of the Masons.

Campbell was married twice: first to Angeline Drake, who died in 1888, and then, in 1899, to Lottie Tyrrell.

He became the first president of the London and Middlesex Historical Society in 1901. Campbell published Pioneer Days in London in 1921.

Campbell died in London.
