= Locust Street =

Major thoroughfare in Philadelphia

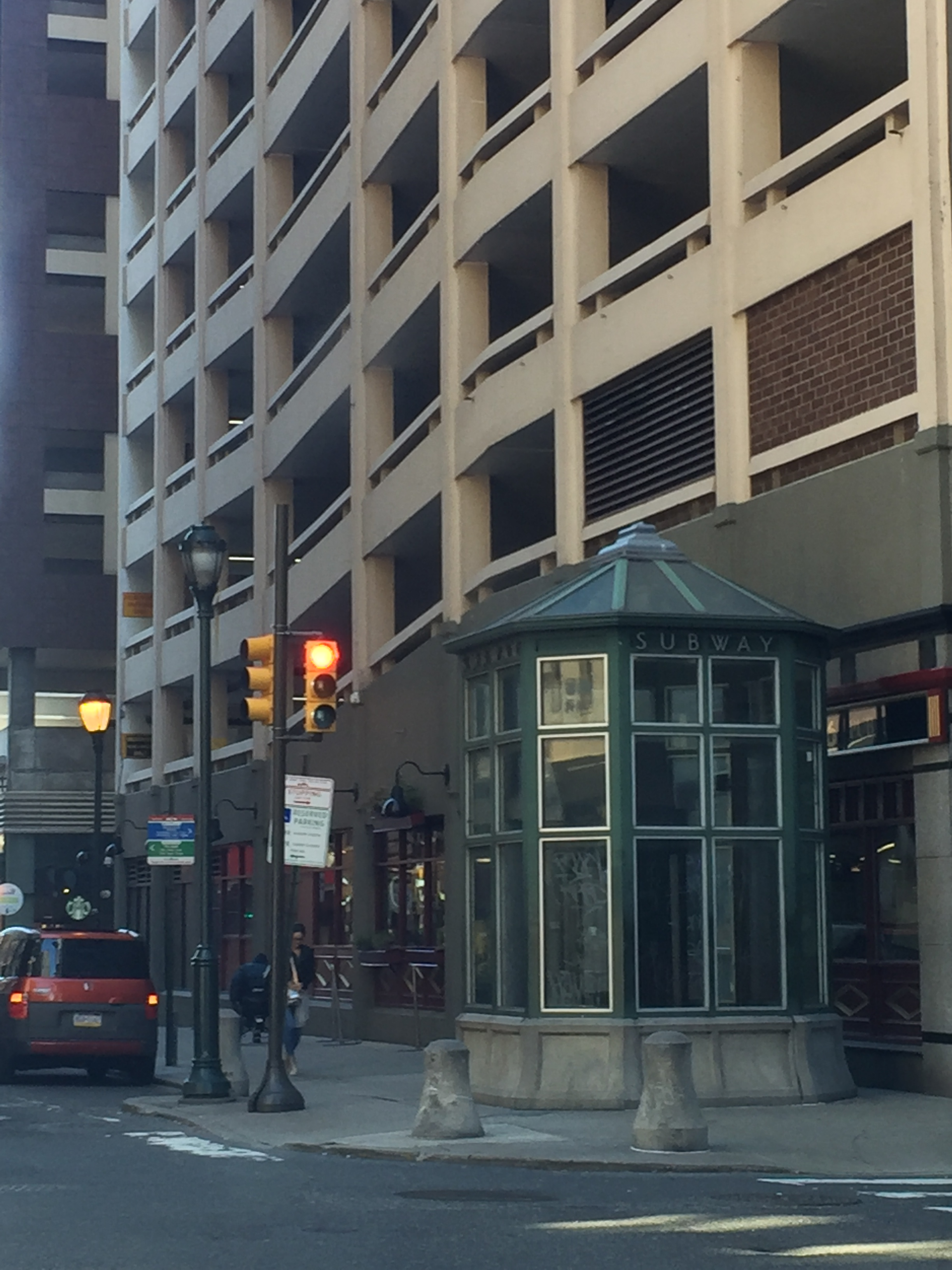
- 12–13th & Locust station on Locust Street in April 2017
- Interactive map of Locust Street
- Part of: Philadelphia, Pennsylvania, U.S.
- Maintained by: PennDOT and City of Philadelphia
- Coordinates: 39.948544°N 75.167946°W

Locust Street is a major historic street in Center City Philadelphia. The street is the location of several prominent Philadelphia-based buildings, historic sights, and high-rise residential locations. It is an east–west street throughout Center City Philadelphia and runs largely parallel to Chestnut Street, another major Center City Philadelphia street.

Locust Street is one of several Philadelphia streets bordering Rittenhouse Square, one of the five original parks established by the city's founder, William Penn, in 1682.

== History ==
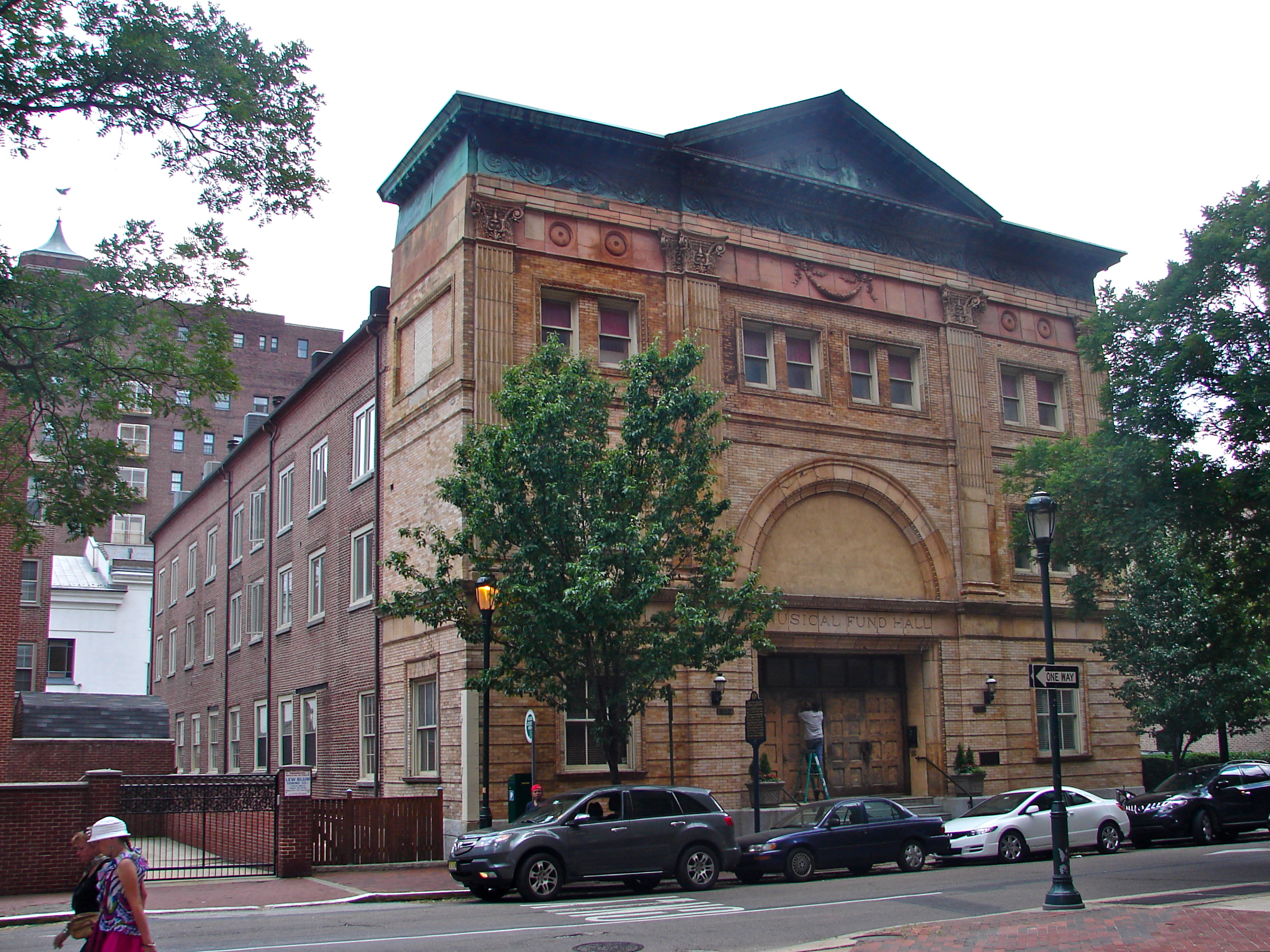
Musical Fund Hall at 808 Locust Street, where the first Republican nominating convention for president and vice president was held from June 17 to 19, 1856

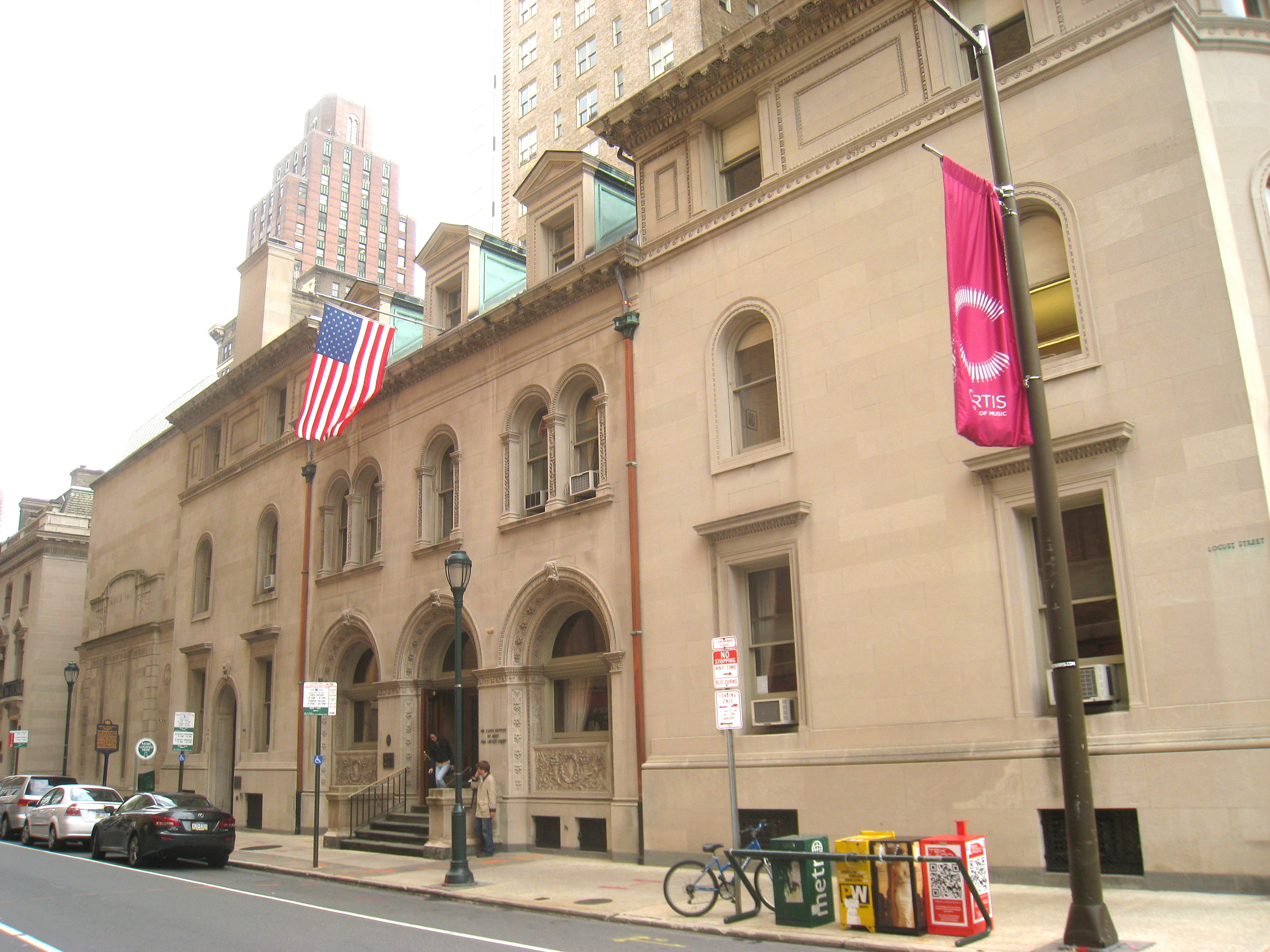
Curtis Institute of Music at 1726 Locust Street, one of the nation's most elite conservatories

In 1682, Locust Street was one of the streets laid out by surveyor Thomas Holme in William Penn's original plan of the city.

In the 1830s, some of Locust Street, around 13th Street, in Center City Philadelphia, was purchased by John Hare Powel, a Pennsylvania politician and agriculturist.

The street includes notable buildings designed by some of the most preeminent architects of the Gilded Age, including a Horace Trumbauer-designed Beaux-Arts limestone building at 1629 Locust Street, a Georgian Revival set of buildings designed by Cope and Stewardson at 1631 and 1633 Locust Streets, a Frank Miles Day-designed Medieval mansion at 17th and Locust Streets, and several John Notman-designed houses and St. Mark’s Church on the 1600 block of Locust Street.

Locust Street is now a hybrid of commercial and residential buildings. It historically was exclusively a residential street with mansions and home to many of the city's most affluent residents.

== Notable residents ==
Since the street's establishment in the late 17th century, several notable Americans have resided on the street, including author and poet Edgar Allan Poe, Union army general Robert Patterson, and others, including:

=== Edmund, Kevin, and Michael Bacon ===
In the 1970s, actor Kevin Bacon and his brother Michael, a musician, grew up in a residence at 2117 Locust Street, where they lived with their parents, Edmund Bacon, a notable Philadelphia urban planner, and his wife, Ruth Hilda Holmes, a former Park Avenue debutante and progressive activist.

=== Frank Furness ===
In the early 1880s, famed Victorian era architect Frank Furness lived at 770 Locust Street. While living there, Furness' smoking room in his Locust Street residence was featured in Artistic Houses, a book published by D. Appleton & Company.

=== Joseph Harrison Jr. ===
From 1857 until his death in 1874, Joseph Harrison Jr., a mechanical engineer, financier, and art collector, resided at 18th and Locust Streets in a residence facing Rittenhouse Square that was designed by Samuel Sloan.

=== Clarence Bloomfield Moore ===
From 1890 until his death in 1936, Clarence Bloomfield Moore, an archeologist and writer, resided at 1321 Locust Street. In 1938, the house became the location of Club 21, a speakeasy and nightclub owned by mobster Max Hoff. It is now the historic Clarence B. Moore House.

=== General Robert Patterson ===
Robert Patterson, a Union army general during the American Civil War, resided at a three-story Greek Revival mansion at 13th and Locust Streets from 1836 until his death in 1881.

=== Edgar Allan Poe ===
Between 1838 and 1844, the famed author and poet Edgar Allan Poe lived at four different locations in Philadelphia, including one residence at 16th and Locust Streets. While in Philadelphia, Poe authored 31 stories, including "The Murders in the Rue Morgue" in 1841 and "The Gold-Bug" and "The Tell-Tale Heart", both in 1843.

== Notable events ==
=== First Republican National Convention ===
In 1856, the first Republican nominating convention for president and vice president was held at Musical Fund Hall at 808 Locust Street.

=== 1981 police officer shooting ===
On December 9, 1981, at 3:55am, Philadelphia Police Department officer Daniel Faulkner conducted a traffic stop of a vehicle carrying Marxist political activist Mumia Abu-Jamal's younger brother William Cook at the intersection of 13th and Locust Streets. During the stop, Faulkner and Cook became engaged in a physical confrontation.

Driving his cab in the vicinity, Abu-Jamal observed the altercation, parked, and ran across the street toward Cook's car. Faulkner was shot in the back and face. He shot Abu-Jamal in the stomach. Faulkner died at the scene from the gunshot to his head, and Abu-Jamal was treated for his wounds at Thomas Jefferson University Hospital, recovered, and was charged with first-degree murder of Faulkner.

In May 1983, Abu-Jamal was convicted and sentenced to death in May 1983. The death sentence was later dropped, but Abu-Jamal's conviction became a global controversy and subject of extensive attention in popular culture, including four documentaries, multiple books, and multiple songs and references in contemporary music.

== Notable buildings and structures ==
Locust Street is the location of several major Philadelphia-based non-profit and historical organizations, including:

- Academy of Music, one of the city's most prominent concert halls, located at the corner of Broad and Locust Streets.
- Clarence B. Moore House, the former residence of archeologist Clarence Bloomfield Moore, at 1321 Locust Street, designed by Wilson Eyre, built in 1890, and named to the National Register of Historic Places in 1973.
- Curtis Institute of Music, one of the nation's premier music conservatories, founded in 1924, located at 1726 Locust Street.
- Dr. Joseph Leidy House, a historic residence at 1310 Locust Street, built in 1893 and 1894, also designed by Wilson Eyre, and named to the National Register of Historic Places in 1980.
- Equitable Trust Building, a historic skyscraper designed by Horace Trumbauer, is located at 1405 Locust Street.
- Historical Society of Pennsylvania, the primary historical society for Pennsylvania, located at 1300 Locust Street.
- Jefferson Health, a major Philadelphia healthcare network, maintains one of its primary outpatient facilities at 1020 Locust Street.
- Library Company of Philadelphia, the nation's oldest library founded by Benjamin Franklin in 1731, housing approximately 500,000 books and 70,000 other items, including the Mayflower Compact, major Revolutionary-era documents, the first editions of two American literary classics, Moby-Dick by Herman Melville and Leaves of Grass by Walt Whitman, and 2,150 items that once belonged to Franklin, located at 1314 Locust Street.
- Musical Fund Hall, a historic Philadelphia venue that has hosted notable speakers, including Marquis de Lafayette, an American Revolutionary War ally (in 1825), Charles Dickens, author of A Tale of Two Cities (in 1842), and the first Republican National Convention (in 1856), located at 808 Locust Street.
- St. Mark's Episcopal Church, founded in 1848 as part of the Oxford Movement, located at 1607-1627 Locust Street on Rittenhouse Square.

== Subway stations ==
PATCO Speedline operates three train stations located in a tunnel under Locust Street:

- 9–10th & Locust station between 9th and 10th streets
- 12–13th & Locust station between 12th and 13th streets
- 15–16th & Locust station between 15th and 16th streets

== In popular culture ==
- In the opening scene to the 1999 movie The Sixth Sense, psychologist Malcolm Crowe, played by Bruce Willis, and his wife Anna Crowe, played by Olivia Williams, confront an intruder in their home. Willis tells him, "This is 47 Locust Street. You have broken a window and entered a private residence....There are no needles or prescription drugs of any kind in this house."
