= Clarence B. Moore House =

Historic house in Pennsylvania, United States

- U.S. National Register of Historic Places
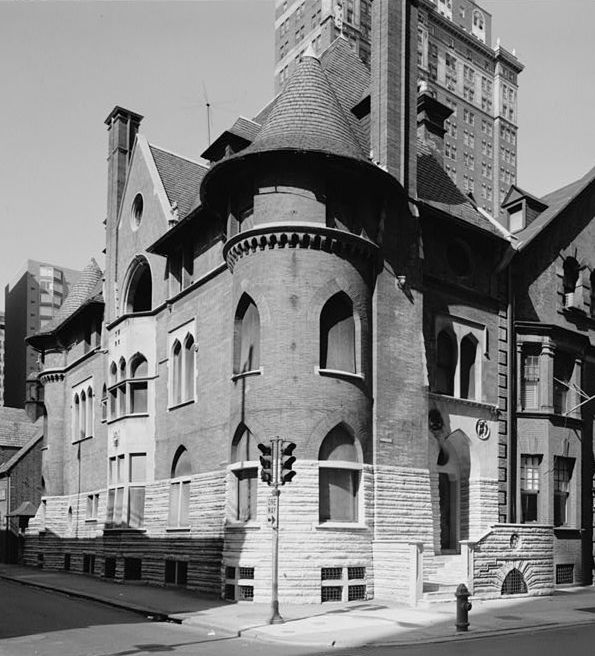
- Clarence B. Moore House in May 1972

- Location within Philadelphia Location within Pennsylvania Location within the United States
- Location: 1321 Locust Street; Philadelphia, Pennsylvania, U.S.
- Coordinates: 39°56′54″N 75°9′49″W
- Built: 1890
- Architect: Wilson Eyre
- Architectural style: Eclectic
- NRHP reference No.: 73001664
- Added to NRHP: May 8, 1973

The Clarence B. Moore House is a historic home located at 1321 Locust Street at the corner of S. Juniper Street between S. 13th and S. Broad Streets in the Washington Square West section of Philadelphia, Pennsylvania. The Moore house was built in 1890 and was designed by architect Wilson Eyre as the home of the merchant, archaeologist, and writer Clarence Bloomfield Moore (1852-1936). It sits next to the Dr. Joseph Leidy House, which Eyre designed in 1893.

The Moore House is a three-story brick building with a raised basement and attic. It was designed in an eclectic style and features a steep slate roof, Gothic-style pointed arched openings, a Venetian loggia on the top floor, projecting walled steps, a large, circular tower inspired by Loire Valley chateaux, and two massive chimneys. The exterior uses rusticated and smooth limestone, Roman brick, and slate. Despite the unusual combination of styles and materials, the house has been called "a delicately balanced asymmetrical composition."

The house was added to the National Register of Historic Places in 1973.

== See also ==
- National Register of Historic Places listings in Center City, Philadelphia
