= Clarence Smith (soccer) =

American soccer player

Clarence Smith was a U.S. soccer player who played the first two U.S. national team games in 1916.

Smith earned two caps with the national team in 1916. In the first official U.S. national team game, the U.S. defeated Sweden on August 20, 1916. On September 3, 1916, Smith and his team mates tied Norway before returning to the U.S.

At the time, he played for Babcock & Wilcox F.C. in the National Association Football League.
