= Clarence Brown (baseball) =

American baseball player

- Pitcher
- Batted: Unknown Threw: Unknown

Negro league baseball debut
- 1941, for the Kansas City Monarchs

Last appearance
- 1941, for the Kansas City Monarchs
- Stats at Baseball Reference

Teams
- Kansas City Monarchs (1941)

Clarence Brown was an American professional baseball pitcher in the Negro leagues. He played with the Kansas City Monarchs in 1941.
