= Clarence Abbott =

Australian rules footballer

Personal information
- Full name: Clarence Charles Percy Abbott
- Nickname: Clarrie
- Born: 9 November 1888; Collingwood, Victoria
- Died: 12 June 1963 (aged 74); Alphington, Victoria
- Original team: Collingwood District

Playing career^{1}
Years	Club	Games (Goals)
1907	Collingwood	2 (0)
1912	Melbourne	1 (0)
Total		3 (0)
- ^{1} Playing statistics correct to the end of 1912.

Clarence Charles Percy Abbott (9 November 1888 – 12 June 1963) was an Australian rules football player who played three games in the Victorian Football League (VFL). In 1907, he played two games for the Collingwood Football Club and subsequently he played with both Brunswick and Essendon Association in the Victorian Football Association. In 1912, he returned to the VFL and played one game for the Melbourne Football Club.

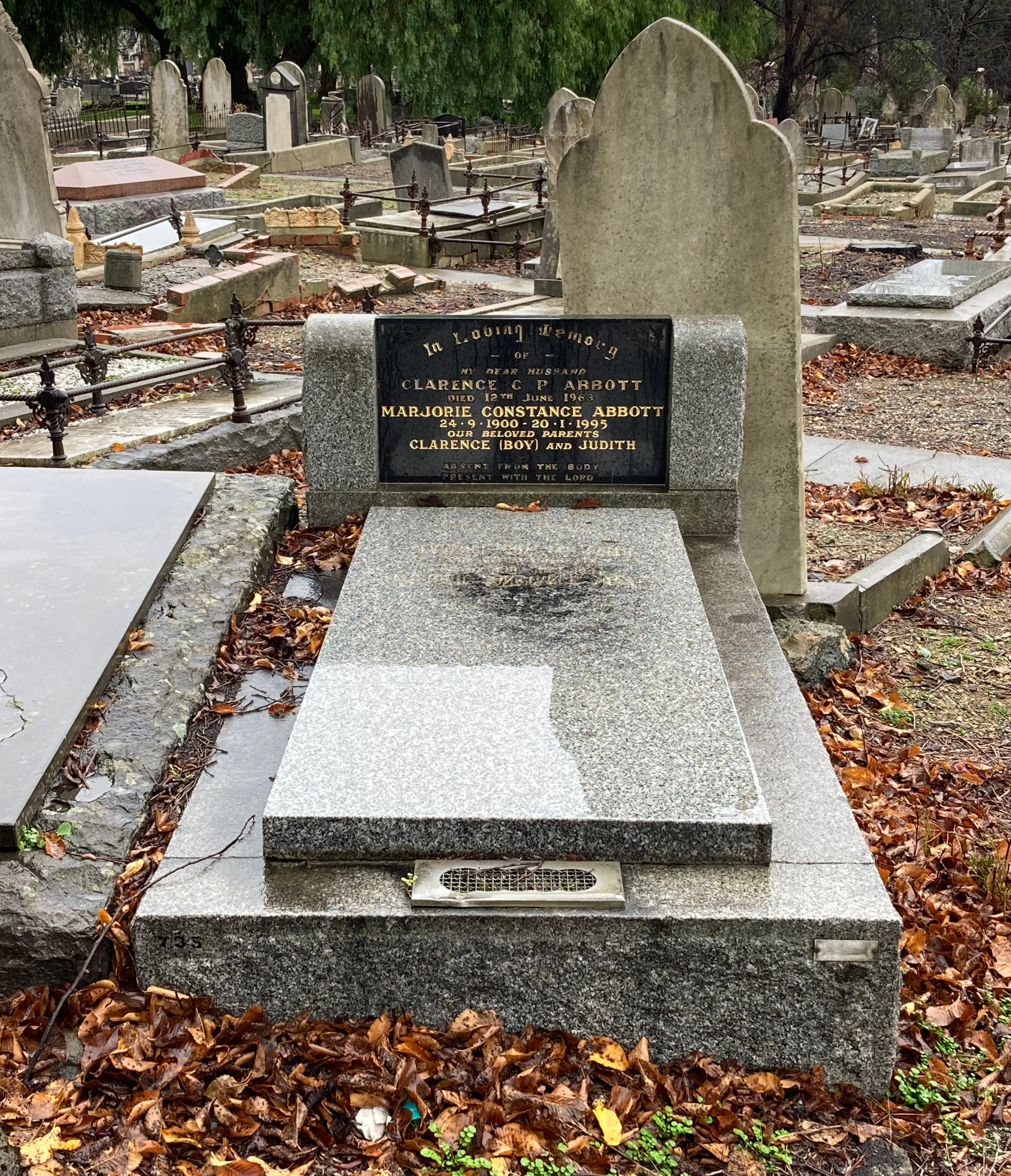
Abbott's grave at Melbourne General Cemetery

== Statistics ==
Legend
G	Goals	K	Kicks	D	Disposals	T	Tackles
B	Behinds	H	Handballs	M	Marks

Season	Team	No.	Games	Totals							Averages (per game)							Votes
Season	Team	No.	Games	G	B	K	H	D	M	T	G	B	K	H	D	M	T	Votes
1907	Collingwood	—N/a	2	0	—N/a	—N/a	—N/a	—N/a	—N/a	—N/a	0.0	—N/a	—N/a	—N/a	—N/a	—N/a	—N/a	0
1912	Melbourne	28	1	0	—N/a	—N/a	—N/a	—N/a	—N/a	—N/a	0.0	—N/a	—N/a	—N/a	—N/a	—N/a	—N/a	0
Career			3	0	—N/a	—N/a	—N/a	—N/a	—N/a	—N/a	0.0	—N/a	—N/a	—N/a	—N/a	—N/a	—N/a	0
