= Clarence Bell =

Clarence Bell may refer to:

- Clarence Bell (basketball) (1914–1985), American basketball player
- Clarence D. Bell (1914–2002), member of the Pennsylvania State Senate
- Clarence E. Bell, (1912–1997), member of the Arkansas State Senate
- Clarence Bell (Boston Legal), a character in Boston Legal
