= Clarence Moore (baseball) =

American baseball player

- First baseman
- Born: January 3, 1908; Eldorado, Arkansas, U.S.
- Died: November 17, 1992 (aged 84); Asheville, North Carolina, U.S.
- Batted: Left Threw: Left

Negro league baseball debut
- 1928, for the Bacharach Giants

Last appearance
- 1928, for the Bacharach Giants

Teams
- Bacharach Giants (1928)

Clarence Lee Moore (January 3, 1908 – November 17, 1992), nicknamed "Cool Breeze", was an American Negro league first baseman in the 1920s.

A native of Eldorado, Arkansas, Moore attended Virginia Union University, Shaw University and North Carolina A & T State University. He briefly played for the Bacharach Giants in 1928. He also played for Gilkerson's Union Giants in 1927, 1928 and again in 1934. For two seasons, in 1935 and 1936, he was the captain of an integrated team in Page, North Dakota. He later became the owner and manager of the Asheville Blues.

He died in Asheville, North Carolina in 1992 at age 84.
