= Clarence Emerson =

Canadian politician (1901–1963)

Clarence Vernon Emerson (January 24, 1901 – September 25, 1963) was a merchant and political figure in New Brunswick, Canada. Emerson sat for Saint John-Albert, New Brunswick division in the Senate of Canada as a Progressive Conservative from 1957 to 1963.

He was born in Saint John, New Brunswick, the son of William E. Emerson and Augusta L. Edelston, and was educated there. Emerson became a merchant in Saint John; he was involved with the family's hardware and plumbing firms and also headed a real estate company; he was president of Emerson Brothers Ltd., vice-president of W.E. Emerson & Sons and a director of Canada Cement. In 1936, he married Frances Aileen Job. Emerson died in office in Saint John at the age of 62.

Emerson was named to the Senate by John Diefenbaker on October 12, 1957.

He was chairman of the Senate's Standing Committee on Finance under the Diefenbaker government and produced an influential report on fighting inflation.

In 1960, he was largely responsible for legislation guaranteeing bank loans to small businesses for capital improvements.
