= Clarence McNair =

American writer

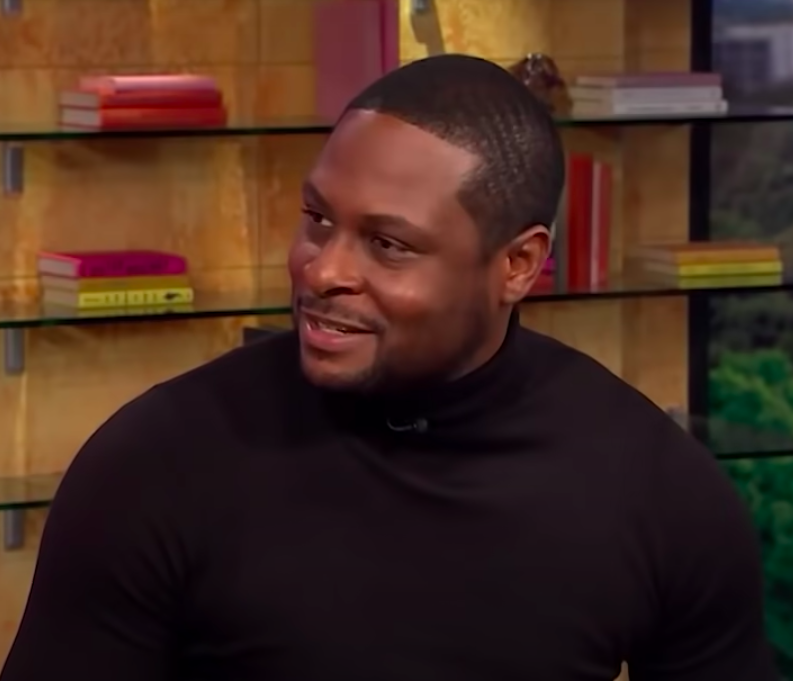
- McNair in 2020
- Born: 30 November 1977 (age 48)
- Occupations: Writer, musician

Clarence McNair (born 30 November 1977) is an American writer and former Motown recording artist known by the stage name KD of the male R&B group "Prophet Jones". McNair quit his R&B career after losing his record label deal with Universal Motown Records in 2000s and later became a successful writer and entrepreneur.

== Background and career ==
McNair was born and raised in East Baltimore MD. He attended Patterson High school. McNair started his R&B career with Prophet Jones before leaving to record his first album. He lost a record label deal for his second album in 2002 and suffered anxiety and panic attacks for several years. After evolving from this, McNair wrote his first book Give It One More Try to share his experience and help depressed people. This was followed with other books including The Black Father Perspective: What we want America to know and Blessings In Uncertain Times: God Is Always Present which is a number one selling book in prayer book category on Amazon.
