= Clarence Bloomfield Moore =

American archaeologist and photographer (1852–1936)

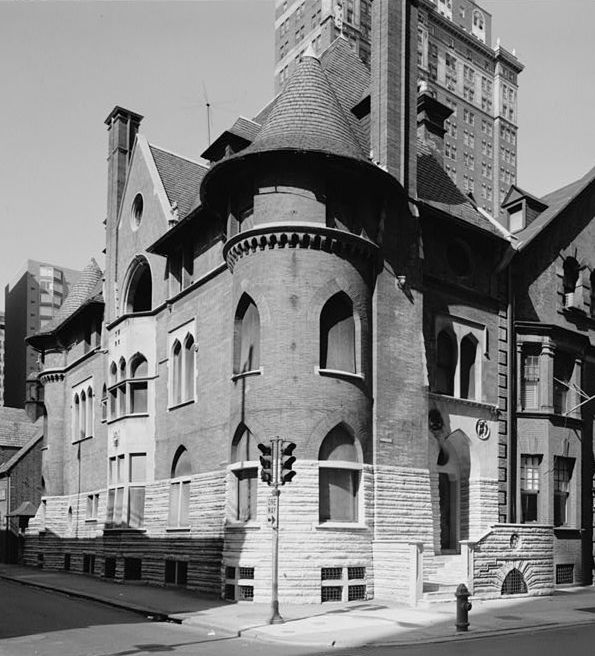
- Clarence B. Moore House in Philadelphia
- Born: Clarence Bloomfield Moore; January 14, 1852; Philadelphia, Pennsylvania, U.S.
- Died: March 14, 1936 (aged 84); St. Petersburg, Florida, U.S.
- Education: Harvard University
- Occupation: Archaeologist

Clarence Bloomfield Moore (January 14, 1852 – March 24, 1936), more commonly known as C.B. Moore, was an American archaeologist and writer. He studied and excavated Native American sites in the Southeastern United States.

== Early life and education ==
Moore was born in Philadelphia, Pennsylvania, on January 14, 1852. His mother Clara Jessup Moore (1824–1899) was an American philanthropist and writer and his father Bloomfield Haines Moore (1819–1878) was a businessman who founded the Jessup & Moore Paper Company in Wilmington, Delaware. Moore was a middle child and only son for Clara and Bloomfield. His sisters were Ella Carlton Moore and Lilian Augusta Stuart Moore. Moore was unmarried and had no children.

After earning his degree in Bachelor of Arts at Harvard University in 1873, Moore traveled to Europe and Central America; he traveled to Peru, crossed the Andes, and went down the Amazon River in 1876, and made a trip around the world, particularly in Asia in 1878–79, before returning home to Philadelphia when his father died in 1878 and became president of the Jessup & Moore Paper Company. In Philadelphia, he resided at 1321 Locust Street in what is now the historic Clarence B. Moore House.

== Career ==
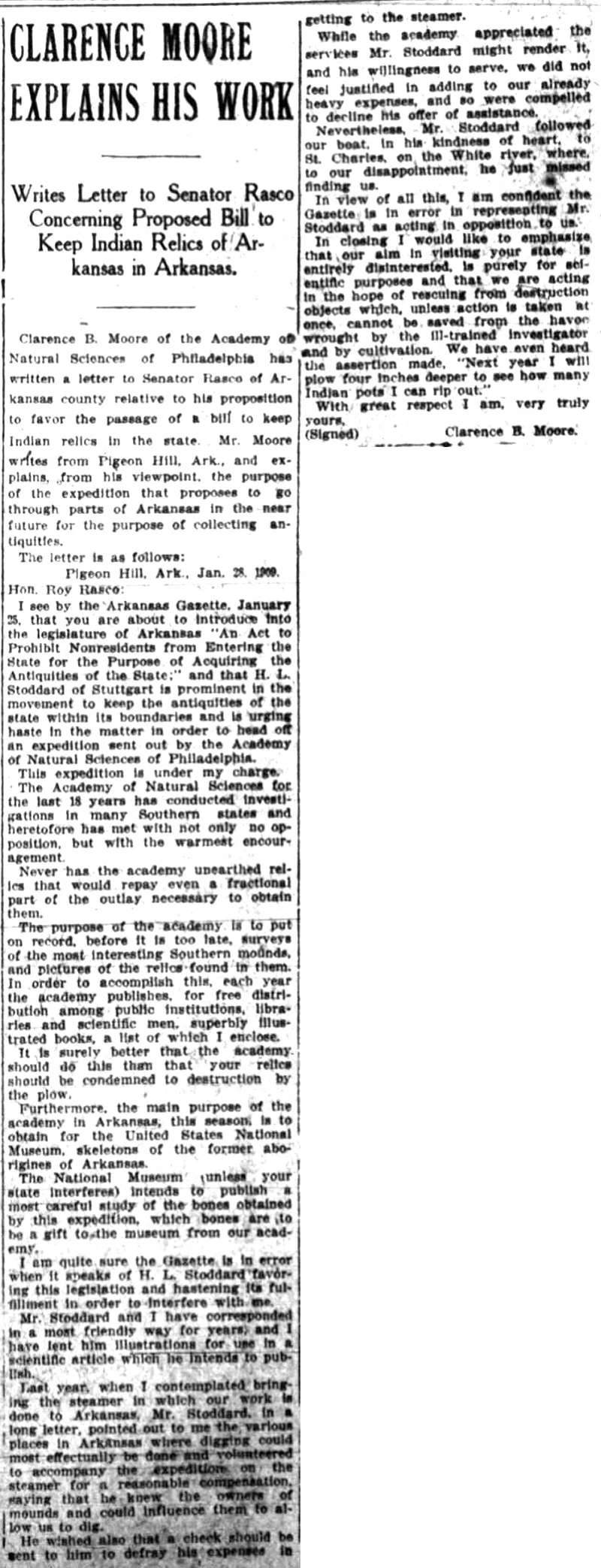
CB Moore Explains his work in the Arkansas Gazette

As the president of Jessup & Moore Paper Company, Moore ran the company for the next ten years, accumulating massive wealth for the majority of the 1880s. However, Moore was eager to travel and explore in the field of archaeology and turned over company management to others.

Over the next 20 years, from the 1890s to 1910s, Moore excavated many Native archeological sites, including 850 sites in the U.S., predominantly in the southern states of Arkansas, Florida, Georgia, Louisiana, and Missouri. From his family fortune and sponsorship from Academy of Natural Sciences, Moore travelled to these sites with his crew mostly by his steamboat, named Gopher of Philadelphia. or through the boat, The Alligator. Moore documented his field excavations and travels from 1892 to 1918; there are 45 notebooks with some located at Cornell University Library. Nineteen of his publications were published and sponsored by the Journal of the Academy of Natural Sciences of Philadelphia.

=== Travel to Florida and Georgia coasts ===
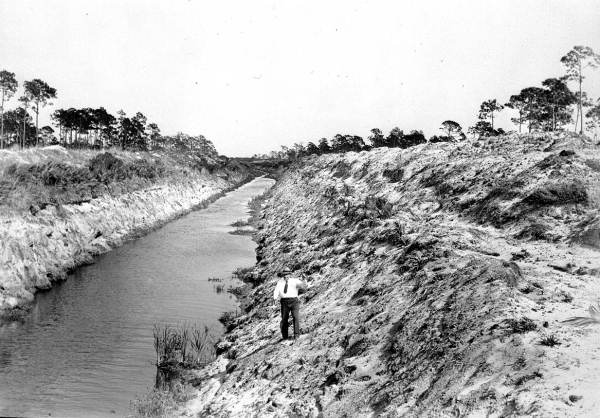
C. B. Moore standing level with bone structure on Phillippi Creek canal just east of Sarasota in 1929

From 1891 to 1895, Moore's home base was in Palatka, Florida, where he began his excavations of Native shell mounds at St. Johns and Ocklawaha River. Between 1896 and 1897, Moore traveled to Ossabaw Island, Georgia, where he "dug at nine aboriginal burial mounds and several “shell middens” (i.e., heaps of food remains [mostly oyster shell], pottery, and other household trash)." Mounds were most often destroyed, as was the custom in early archaeology. Moore frequently evaded paying the owners of the land on which the mounds were located by advertising himself as a leveler of mounds that would free the site to be used for agricultural purposes.

Moore was elected a member of the American Antiquarian Society in 1895. However, he frequently communicated through correspondence as it was difficult for Moore to attend the meetings due to the long distance. In 1897, Moore was elected to the American Philosophical Society.

== Legacy and honors ==
Artifacts from the mounds were held as a collection to the Academy of Natural Sciences in Philadelphia until George Gustav Heye, the founder of Museum of American Indian and collector of Native American artifacts, transferred Moore's collection, which later became part of the Smithsonian's National Museum of the American Indian.

In 1990, the Lower Mississippi Valley Survey of Harvard University, in conjunction with the Southeastern Archaeological Conference, created the C.B. Moore Award for Excellence in Southeastern Archaeology by a Young Scholar. However, this award was renamed in October of 2021 to the "SEAC Rising Scholar Award" as a recognition the problematic nature of Moore's work on burial mounds and his treatment of American Indian ancestor's remains.

The Clarence B. Moore House was listed on the National Register of Historic Places in 1973.

== Personal life ==
Between the 1880s and 1890s, Moore's vision in both eyes would begin to deteriorate after an injury during a game of tennis in his left eye, and his right eye naturally but slowly experienced the loss of vision, limiting Moore's ability to travel, write, and engage in photography.

Moore died on March 24, 1936, in St. Petersburg, Florida, at the age of 77 after enduring many years of chronic illness.

== Original publications ==
- Certain Aboriginal Mounds of the Coast of South Carolina, 1898.
- Certain Aboriginal Mounds of the Georgia Coast, 1903.
- Antiquities of the Ouachita Valley, 1909.
- Antiquities of the St. Francis, White, and Black Rivers, Arkansas, 1910.
- Sheet-copper from the Mounds is Not Necessarily of European Origin, 1903.
- Aboriginal Urn-burial in the United States, 1904.
- A Burial Mound of Florida, 1892.

== Publication collections ==
- The East Florida Expeditions of Clarence Bloomfield Moore. Jeffrey Mitchem, ed. University of Alabama Press, 1999.
- The Georgia and South Carolina Coastal Expeditions of Clarence Bloomfield Moore. Lewis Larson, ed. University of Alabama Press, 1998.
- The Louisiana and Arkansas Expeditions of Clarence Bloomfield Moore. Richard Weinstein, David H. Kelley, and Joe W Saunders, ed. University of Alabama Press, 2004.
- The Lower Mississippi Valley Expeditions of Clarence Bloomfield Moore. Dan Morse and Phyllis Morse, ed. University of Alabama Press, 1998.
- The Moundville Expeditions of Clarence Bloomfield Moore. Vernon Knight, ed. University of Alabama Press, 1996.
- The Northwest Florida Expeditions of Clarence Bloomfield Moore. David S. Brose and Nancy Marie White, ed. University of Alabama Press, 1999
- The Southern and Central Alabama Expeditions of Clarence Bloomfield Moore. Craig Sheldon, Jr, ed. University of Alabama Press, 2001.
- The Tennessee, Green, and Lower Ohio River Expeditions of Clarence Bloomfield Moore. Richard Polhemus, ed. University of Alabama Press, 2002.
- West and Central Florida Expeditions of Clarence Bloomfield Moore. Jeffrey Mitchem, ed. University of Alabama Press, 1999.

== Related archival collections ==
- Cornell University Library
- Academy of Natural Sciences of Drexel University
- National Museum of the American Indian
