= Clarence N. Weems Jr. =

American Koreanist (1907–1996)

- Born: May 28, 1907; Arkansas, United States
- Died: August 18, 1996 (aged 89)
- Education: Harvard University (1938); Vanderbilt University (BA 1930, MA 1933)

Korean name
- Hangul: 위대현
- Hanja: 魏大賢
- RR: Wi Daehyeon
- MR: Wi Taehyŏn

Clarence Norwood Weems Jr. (May 28, 1907 – August 18, 1996) was an American scholar of Korean studies and a military officer.

He was instrumental in facilitating the Eagle Project, a World War II joint operation between the United States Office of Strategic Services and the Korean Liberation Army of the Korean Provisional Government. Weems and his family are remembered fondly in South Korea, for their contributions to education and advocacy for Korean independence.

== Early life ==
Weems was born on May 28, 1907, in Arkansas. His father was Clarence Norwood Weems Sr. (1875–1952) and mother Nancy. He came from a family of missionaries and academics going back several generations; for example, his ancestor Mason Locke Weems was a minister and noted biographer of George Washington.

In fall 1909, took the family to Songdo (now Kaesong, North Korea) in the Korean Empire. The family arrived and lived in Korea during a tumultuous time, shortly after the Japan–Korea Treaty of 1910, in which the Empire of Japan forcefully colonized the country. Japan went on to impose restrictions on the Christian community. In spite of this, Weems Sr. became a leading figure there, and went on to spend 32 years in the country with the Methodist mission. He built over 32 churches, trained 25 Korean preachers, enrolled hundreds of children in schools, and served as a member of the board for Yonsei University.

Weems Jr. was given the nickname "Clam" by his family. He had an older brother, David, and two younger brothers, William Rupert and Benjamin Burch. All the Weems children were raised in Korea, and the youngest two were even born there. After attending the Songdo School for Foreign Students, they went to the United States for education at a boarding school, and all eventually returned to Korea.

== Return to the United States ==
He returned to the United States and attended high school at Hendrix Academy (now Hendrix College). He went on to study at Vanderbilt University, from which he graduated with a bachelor's in history in 1930. He enrolled in a master's program there immediately afterwards. His master's thesis is entitled "Japan's Acquisition of Korea from the Treaty of Shimonoseki (1895) to the Annexation of Korea by Japan (1910)".

After he graduated in 1933, he worked briefly in Washington as a typist. He then went on to study at Harvard University in Boston, but had several interruptions in his education. He got married in 1935 and began a family, and worked as a business administrator. He graduated from Harvard in 1938, with a thesis entitled "Comparative methods of Japanese expansion in Korea and Manchuria". In 1941, he moved to Shreveport, Louisiana to work for the J. B. Beaird Corporation in the oil and gas industry.

== Military career ==
On December 7, 1941, Japan attacked Pearl Harbor, which led to the entry of the United States into World War II. Weems began serving in the war effort first as a civilian intelligence analyst for the army. In February 1942, the Military Intelligence Service (MIS) hired Weems and made him its main analyst on Korean issues. Weems returned to Washington. On 18 September 1942, he was promoted to first lieutenant.

On February 27, 1943, he gave a presentation at the invitation of the California Korean Reserve at the Palace Hotel, San Francisco, entitled "Korea Yesterday and Tomorrow". A few days afterwards, on March 8, he was placed in the San Francisco office of the Office of Strategic Services (OSS).

From October 1943 until March 1945, he worked out of the OSS headquarters in India. He then moved to the OSS office in Anhui between June and August 1945, and was placed in charge of a training camp for Koreans guerillas.

After the liberation of Korea in August 1945, Weems returned to the United States for a vacation, and went back to Korea to work in the United States Military Government in Korea (USAMGIK) as a translator and aide for General Archibald Arnold. He was promoted to the rank of major in July 1946.

== Personal life ==
In 1935, he married Jennie Dunn Ligon from Richmond, Virginia. They had their first son together, William Sumner Weems in June 1939.

== Sources ==
=== In English ===
- Kim, Robert S. (2017), Project Eagle: The American Christians of North Korea in World War II, U of Nebraska Press, ISBN 978-1-61234-930-5

=== In Korean ===
- Kim, Dongsun (2017), "미군정기 미국선교사 2세와 한국정치세력의 형성- 윌리엄스(George Zur Williams)와 윔스(Clarence N. Weems Jr.)를 중심으로-" [Second-Generation American Missionaries and Formation of Korean Political Forces during U.S. Military Government in Korea – Focused on George Zur Williams and Clarence N. Weems Jr.-], 한국민족운동사연구 [Journal of Studies on Korean National Movement] (in Korean), 91: 203–244, doi:10.19162/KNM.91.2017.6.06
- Kim, Seungtae (2022), "태평양전쟁기 미국 선교사와 그 자녀들의 대일전 참여 -미북장로회 내한 선교사를 중심으로-" [The Participation of American Protestant Missionaries and their Children in the Pacific War], 한국민족운동사연구 [Journal of Studies on Korean National Movement] (in Korean) (78): 41–80
