= Symphony Nova Scotia =

Canadian orchestra

- Orchestra
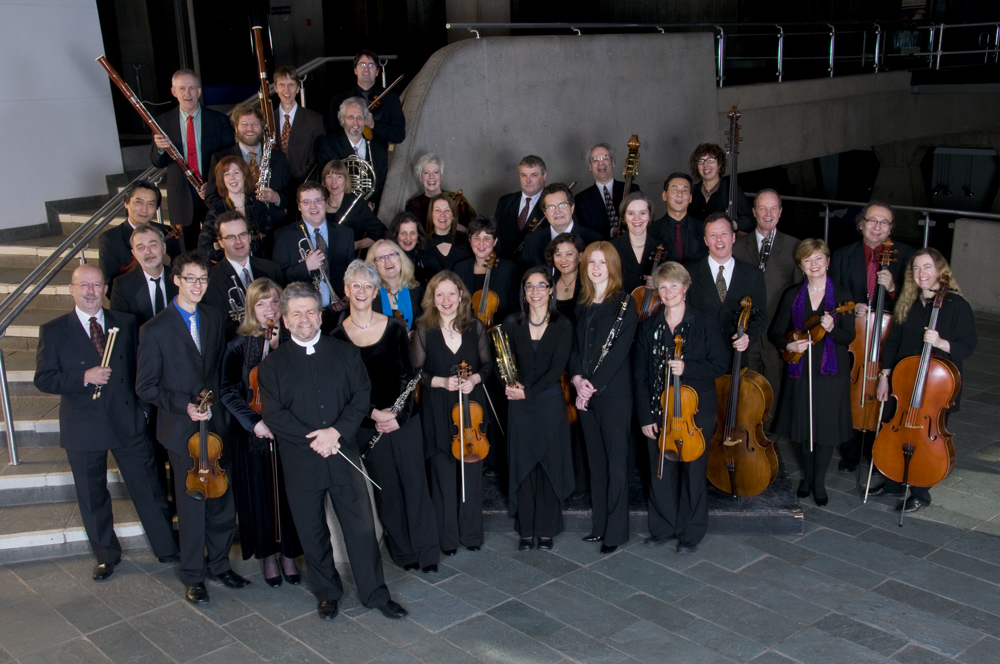
- Bernhard Gueller and the musicians at the Dalhousie Arts Centre, 2010.
- Founded: 1983
- Location: Halifax, Nova Scotia
- Concert hall: Dalhousie Arts Centre
- Principal conductor: Holly Mathieson
- Website: symphonynovascotia.ca

Symphony Nova Scotia is a Canadian orchestra based in Halifax, Nova Scotia, Canada. Its primary recital venue is at the Dalhousie Arts Centre's Rebecca Cohn Auditorium.

== History ==
Symphony Nova Scotia began in 1983 with 13 full-time musicians. Today it employs 37 musicians and 16 administrative staff, along with over 150 contracted artistic, production and technical personnel. It has won four East Coast Music Awards for classical music.

=== Orchestral lineage ===
The first recognized orchestra in Nova Scotia, the Halifax Symphony Orchestra, was formed in 1897. This orchestra, led by conductor Max Weil, reached a membership of 39 musicians and performed four to five concerts each season. The orchestra disbanded in 1908 with Weil’s departure.

In 1947 another orchestra was created in Nova Scotia through the efforts of Walter Kaufmann and Alfred Strombergs as well as Mariss Vetra and Dr. Srul Tulio Laufer. Backed by the Nova Scotia Opera Association, the orchestra primarily served as accompaniment for opera and ballet performances. Formally named the Halifax Sinfoniette in 1951, the group of 13 professional musicians was led by Strombergs until 1955.

In 1955 the Sinfoniette became the second incarnation of the Halifax Symphony Orchestra. The orchestra began under music director Thomas Mayer with 17 full-time musicians (often augmented by members from the Royal Canadian Artillery Band and the Stadacona Navy Band). By 1966 the orchestra had 35 full-time members and presented about 70 concerts annually. Conductors included Jonathan Sternberg (1957–58), Leo Mueller (1958–64), and John Fenwick (1964–67).

When the Halifax Symphony Orchestra and New Brunswick Symphony Orchestra (founded in 1962) were both disbanded in 1968, the Atlantic provinces created the 48-member Atlantic Symphony Orchestra, a regional orchestra designed to tour the four provinces.

Despite the Atlantic Symphony Orchestra’s popularity, it suffered from high costs, declining government and corporate support, and a lengthy labour dispute in 1979. The orchestra declared bankruptcy in 1983.

=== Foundation ===
The logo of Symphony Nova Scotia

In October 1983 Symphony Nova Scotia was created under the direction of conductor Boris Brott and Board president Brian Flemming.

The original Symphony Nova Scotia hired 13 full-time players for a January to May season. In its second season the number of employed musicians doubled, and by 1987 the orchestra had grown to a complement of 39. Boris Brott is the only Canadian to be appointed music director of Symphony Nova Scotia.

=== Georg Tintner, 1987–1994 ===
Austrian conductor Georg Tintner succeeded Boris Brott in 1987. Under his leadership, Symphony Nova Scotia made six recordings, toured to Ontario and Quebec, and initiated several community outreach programs, including a production of The Nutcracker in collaboration with Halifax Dance and Mermaid Theatre of Nova Scotia.

The orchestra also raised $140,000 during a 1992 fundraising event called Pure Gold that featured violinist Isaac Stern and contralto Maureen Forrester.

Tintner served as Symphony Nova Scotia’s principal conductor until 1994, and as Conductor Laureate until his death in 1999.

=== 1994–1996 ===
The orchestra struggled financially and artistically during a period of severe cutbacks in government funding. Despite attempts to cut costs by imposing wage freezes on the orchestra and staff and cutting the season to 27 weeks, by 1995 the Symphony was forecasting an accumulated deficit of $900,000.

To address the immediate cash flow crisis, the Board of Directors, after consulting with staff and musicians, chose to restructure the organization rather than to shut the orchestra down. The orchestra members donated their services for two weeks during a provincial tour with a young fiddler from Cape Breton, Natalie MacMaster. The administrative staff was reduced and reorganized, and Raffi Armenian was hired as interim artistic director until American conductor Leslie Dunner was chosen to take the podium in 1996-97.

=== 1996–2000 ===
In 1996-97 the orchestra opted to re-establish free public concerts and school visits, previously pared to save costs.

1998-99 was Dunner’s last season as Music Director with the orchestra, and a search began for a new conductor. With the death of Conductor Laureate and Artistic Advisor Georg Tintner in October 1999, orchestra, staff and Board members made artistic decisions until Simon Streatfeild was hired as Artistic Advisor in May 2000.

=== Bernhard Gueller, 2002–2018 ===
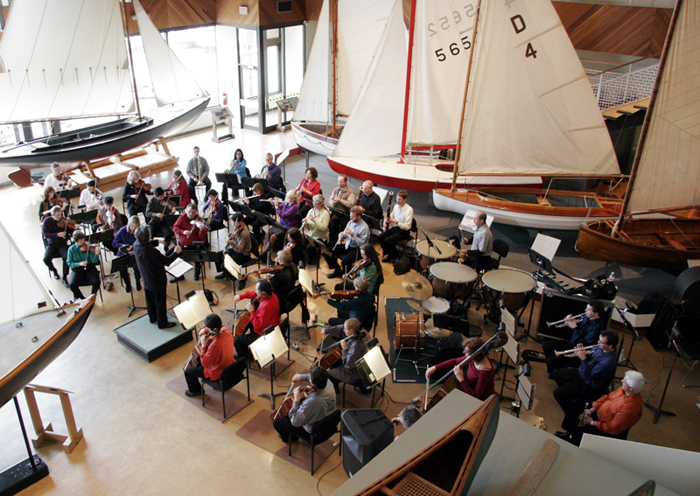
Symphony Nova Scotia performs at the Maritime Museum of the Atlantic in Halifax

German conductor Bernhard Gueller was announced as the new music director in July 2002 and began his inaugural season in September of that year. He served in the post until 2018.

Gueller was assisted from 2005 to 2008 by the orchestra’s conductor-in-residence, Sri-Lankan-born Dinuk Wijeratne. In 2008, when Wijeratne had completed his Canada Council-funded term with the orchestra, Cape Breton native Martin MacDonald was appointed as the new resident conductor. MacDonald completed his term in May 2011, when Israeli-born Shalom Bard was selected as his successor. Jonathan Govias was then selected as resident conductor for the 2012-13 season.

The orchestra has recently renewed a focus on touring, regularly traveling to communities across the province and incorporating a full concert series in Lunenburg, Nova Scotia. It also participates in community engagement and outreach initiatives with partners from the educational, artistic, heritage and ethnic communities, with guidance from Artist-in-Residence and Community Ambassador Daniel Bartholomew-Poyser.

The orchestra has been praised for its versatility and flexibility, and for performances in a variety of styles. Conductor and arranger Howard Cable calls Symphony Nova Scotia “the most versatile orchestra in Canada,” and the Chronicle Herald has said that:

"...they can play it all: Beethoven, Shostakovich, Hatzis and Current, as well as Tommy Dorsey, Scott Macmillan, Rose Cousins, Buck 65 and Natalie MacMaster."

=== Recent history ===
In 2018, Holly Mathieson first guest-conducted the orchestra, as one of two finalist candidates for the post of music director. She returned in November 2019 for a further guest-conducting engagement. In December 2019, Symphony Nova Scotia announced the appointment of Mathieson as its next music director, effective January 2020, with an initial contract of three years. Mathieson is the first female conductor to be named music director of Symphony Nova Scotia. It was announced that the 2024-2025 season will be Mathieson's last season as the music director of Symphony Nova Scotia.

== Cross-over collaborations ==
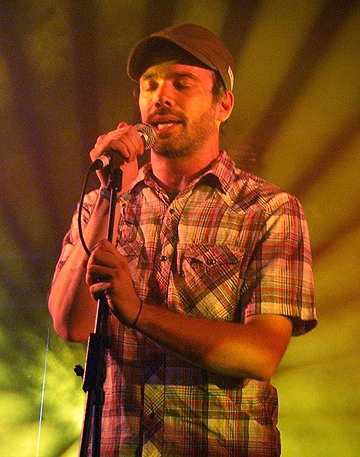
Buck 65 (2006)

Symphony Nova Scotia has collaborated with popular and folk music artists. According to CBC Canada Live broadcaster Andrew Craig, “Symphony Nova Scotia simply proves that orchestras can evolve, and that there is no loss of artistic integrity in promoting the music of living composers, pop or otherwise.”

Pops collaborations in recent years include:

- Hip hop artist Buck 65 (2008)
- Celtic fiddlers Natalie MacMaster (1995, 1996, 2009), Ashley MacIsaac (2010), and Richard Wood (2011)
- R&B/Soul singers Dutch Robinson (2011), and Keonte Beals (2022)
- Pop-rock trio Mir (2009)
- Singer-songwriters Chris "Old Man" Luedecke (2008) Jill Barber (2008) Gordie Sampson (2008), Jenn Grant (2010, 2011), David Myles (2010), Meaghan Smith (2011), Erin Costelo (2011), Basia Bulat (2010), the Sons of Maxwell (2011), Hawksley Workman (2011), Amelia Curran (2011), and Sarah Slean (2012).
- Indie pop icons Owen Pallett (2009), Dan Mangan (2012)
- Local artists Carmen Townsend, Ben Caplan, and Carleton Stone (2012)
- Songwriter and TV personality Steve Smith from The Red Green Show (2010)
- Drag queen Thorgy Thor (2018)

== Recordings ==
=== Discography ===
- 1990 - 'Down Under', Music from Australia, New Zealand and Canada, Georg Tintner, conductor (CBC Records)
- 1991 - Mozart Marches and Dances, Les petits riens, Georg Tintner, conductor (CBC Records)
- 1992 - Opportunity Knocks, Howard Cable, conductor (CBC Records)
- 1994 - Music of Frederick Delius, Georg Tintner, conductor (CBC Records)
- 1995 - Beethoven, Vaughan Williams, Bales, Georg Tintner, conductor (CBC Maritimes)
- 1997 - Late Romantics, Georg Tintner, conductor (CBC Records)
- 2001 - MacKinnons' Brook Suite, Scott MacMillan, conductor (Warner Music Group)
- 2003 - Seasons' Celebration, Howard Cable, conductor (CBC Records)
- 2003 - Tintner Memorial Collection (Naxos Records)
  - Vol 1: Mozart Symphonies No. 31, 35 and 40
  - Vol 2: Schubert Symphonies No. 8, 9
  - Vol 3: Beethoven Symphony No. 4- Schumann Symphony No. 2
  - Vol 4: Haydn Symphonies Nos. 103, 104
  - Vol 5: Brahms Symphony No. 3, Serenade No. 2
  - Vol 6: Beethoven Symphony No. 3 - Sibelius Symphony No. 7
  - Vol 7: Mozart Idomeneo Overture, Symphonies Nos. 34, 41
  - Vol 10: Music of Frederick Delius. 1994 (re-release)
  - Vol 11: Mozart Marches & Dances, Les Petits Riens (re-release)
  - Vol 12: Down Under (re-release)
- 2006 - Dancing in the Light, Bernhard Gueller, conductor (CBC Records)
- 2010 - Music and Image - Atlantic Film Festival East Coast Music Association (Take 6), Dinuk Wijeratne, conductor (Warner Music Canada)
- 2011 - O Canada: A Celebration of Our National Anthem, Bernhard Gueller, conductor (CBC/Radio-Canada)
- 2012 - The Barra MacNeils with Symphony Nova Scotia (Live), Martin MacDonald, conductor (Fontana Records)

=== Recent CBC recordings for radio broadcast ===
==== 2011/12 Season ====
- April 13, 2012: "Sarah Slean" concert, featuring Sarah Slean (piano, vocals). *Parts of this concert were also video recorded for television broadcast.*
- February 9, 2012: "East Meets West" concert, featuring Ed Hanley, tabla.
- October 21, 2011: Halifax Pop Explosion: Amelia Curran, featuring Amelia Curran, (guitar, vocals).

==== 2010/11 Season ====
- April 28, 2011: Edvard Grieg’s Piano Concerto, featuring Jon Kimura Parker, piano.
- April 7/10, 2011: Derek Charke’s Symphony no. 1, “Transient Energies.”
- March 24, 2011: “Mozart’s Jupiter” concert, featuring Avan Yu, piano.
- February 10, 2011: “Elizabeth Bishop in Word & Music” concert, featuring Suzie LeBlanc, soprano.
- January 27, 2011: Saint-Saëns’ Violin Concerto no. 3, featuring Jonathan Crow, violin.
- January 21, 2011: Concert collaboration with Erin Costelo (vocals, piano) and Meaghan Smith (vocals, guitar).
- November 25, 2010: “Piano Prodigy Jan Lisiecki” concert, featuring Jan Lisiecki, piano.
- October 1, 2010: “Red Green: With Strings Attached” concert, featuring Steve Smith (comedian) and Morag Smith.

==== 2009/10 Season ====
- May 2, 2010: “Antonín Dvořák Festival: From the New World” concert, featuring Giora Schmidt, violin.
- April 29, 2010: “Antonín Dvořák Festival: The Cello Concerto” concert, featuring Matt Haimovitz, cello.
- March 11, 2010: “Left-Handed Concerto” concert, featuring Katherine Chi.
- February 19, 2010: Concert collaboration with Jenn Grant, vocals.
- November 27, 2010: “A Soldier’s Carol” concert, featuring Mir (band).
- October 23, 2010: “Final Fantasy” concert, featuring Owen Pallett, violin/piano/electronics.

== Awards and nominations ==
=== Awards ===
- 1995 - East Coast Music Award for Music of Frederick Delius
- 1998 – East Coast Music Award for Late Romantics
- 2000 – Music Industry Association of Nova Scotia Special Recognition Award
- 2002 – East Coast Music Award for MacKinnon's Brook Suite

=== Nominations ===
- 2004 – East Coast Music Award nomination for Tintner Memorial Edition Vol. 1
- 2004 – East Coast Music Award nomination for Seasons' Celebration des saisons
- 2007 – East Coast Music Award nomination for Dancing in the Light

== Educational programs ==
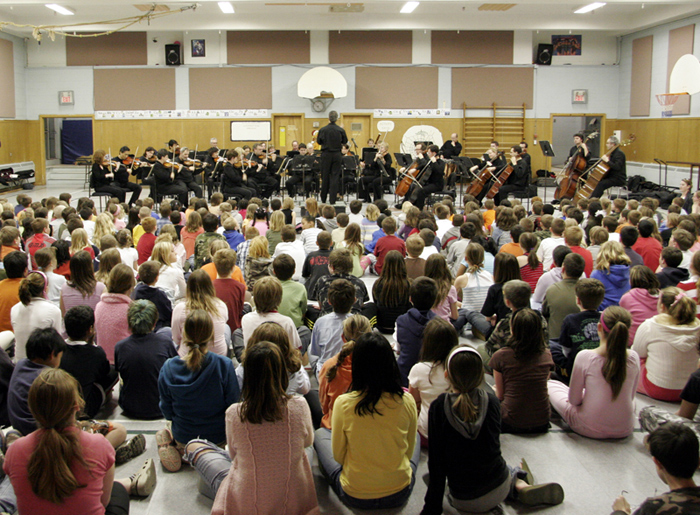
Symphony Nova Scotia performs in an elementary school in Nova Scotia

- School and Public Open Rehearsals
- Pre-Concert Chats
- School Matinees
- Library Series
- In-School Concerts
- Adopt-a-Musician
- Musical Munchkins

== See also ==
- Binnie Brennan, classical violinist with Symphony Nova Scotia
- Halifax Camerata Singers, chamber choir based in Halifax
