= Diane Oxner =

- Born: Diane Elizabeth Oxner; November 10, 1928; Lunenburg, Nova Scotia, Canada
- Died: January 23, 2025 (aged 96); Lunenburg, Nova Scotia, Canada
- Education: Bouve Boston School of Physical Education; Curtis Institute of Music
- Occupations: Soprano; Voice teacher

Diane Elizabeth Oxner-Macdonald (November 10, 1928 – January 23, 2025) was a Canadian soprano and voice teacher. She was a soloist in the choir at the St. Matthew's United Church and had roles with the Nova Scotia Opera Association and the Halifax Symphony Orchestra among recordings. Oxner worked at the Maritime Conservatory of Music in Halifax from 1954 and began her role as a voice teacher with the New Brunswick Academy of Music in 1958. She was musical director of the New Brunswick Opera Association from 1969 to 1972 and then moved to Scotland to co-manage a hotel. Oxner returned to Canada in 1983 and became choral director of the Lunenburg Chorale in 1985.

== Early life ==
Oxner was born on November 10, 1928, in Lunenburg, Nova Scotia. Her mother, Pearl Young Oxner, was the conductor of the Lunenburg Male Choir and a contralto and teacher, and her father was B.G. Oxner. Oxner graduated from Lunenburg Academy in 1947, and was a member of the Lunenburg Mixed Quarette. She later attended the Bouve Boston School of Physical Education for two years under Margaret Armstrong Gow. In Boston, Oxner was a member of the Cecilia Society of Boston and the choir of the Old South Church. She opted to further her vocal training at The Curtis Institute of Music, Philadelphia in 1950, graduating with a Bachelor of Music degree in Opera in 1954. Oxner also studied at opera school in Pittsburgh and received vocal training in Halifax.

== Career ==
Following graduation, Oxner returned to Lunenburg. She sung soprano, was a soloist in the choir at the St. Matthew's United Church, performing at the 1950 Halifax Music Festival and received honourable mention in the 1954–1955 Singing Stars of Tomorrow. Oxner joined the staff of the Maritime Conservatory of Music in Halifax in 1954, and featured on television and radio, appearing on CBC Radio (such as Invitation in mid-1955), Trans-Canada Network and CBHT-TV in Halifax in leading operatic roles throughout the Maritimes. She appeared at the Nova Scotia Festival of the Arts from 1956 to 1958. Oxner recorded a number of Helen Creighton's Nova Scotia folk songs, Gypsy folk songs, as well as children's songs, and had roles with the Nova Scotia Opera Association and the Halifax Symphony Orchestra.

She began voice teaching at the New Brunswick Academy of Music and joined Saint John as a church soloist in 1958. Oxner also taught privately in Fredericton. She performed with the New Brunswick Symphony Orchestra and at the Centenary Queen Square United Church. From 1969 to 1972, Oxner was musical director of the New Brunswick Opera Association. She moved to Scotland in 1974, and ran a hotel in the Highland village of Newtonmore with her husband. Oxner returned to Canada in October 1982. She was made choral director of the Lunenburg Chorale in 1985, and led and directed both Jr. And Sr. Choir for the Central United Church for the next 20 year. Oxner resumed teaching at the Maritime Conservatory of Music in Halifax and with private students. Her students included the likes of Sarah McLachlan.

Oxner recorded the LP Traditional Folksongs of Nova Scotia in 1973 and also took part in Canadian Folk Songs: A Centennial Collection. Following retirement, she gave private lessons, helped local choirs and volunteered at numerous functions and festivals across Lunenburg.

== Personal life ==
Oxner married Scottish-born James MacDonald in 1958 but she continued to use her maiden name in a professional context. There were three children of the marriage. She died in Lunenberg on the morning of January 23, 2025 and her memorial service took place at Central United Church in Lunenburg on March 1.
