= Halifax Conservatory of Music =

Canadian music conservatory

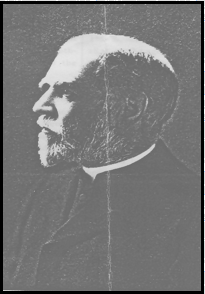
Rev Robert Laing, founder of the Maritime Conservatory of the Arts (originally known as the Halifax Conservatory of Music)

The Halifax Conservatory of Music (HCM) was a Canadian music conservatory in Halifax, Nova Scotia that offered courses in higher education in music during the late 19th century and first half of the 20th century. In 1954 the HCM merged with the Maritime Academy of Music to form the Maritime Conservatory of Music (now Maritime Conservatory of Performing Arts).

== History ==
Founded in 1887 by Reverend Robert Laing and the Halifax Ladies' College (HLC), the HCM drew students from across the Maritime provinces. Organist Charles Henry Porter served as the school's first director and under his leadership the school grew to a total of 240 students by 1890. Felix Heink, the brother of Ernestine Schumann-Heink's husband, succeeded Porter as director in 1900. He in turn was succeeded a year later by Percy Gordon.

In 1898, the HCM developed a partnership with Dalhousie University through which the conservatory granted two-year licentiate diplomas and four-year Bachelor of Music degrees. It also maintained its connection with Halifax Ladies' College until 1952. In 1906 organist and conductor Harry Dean succeeded Gordon as director. Disputes with the school's board caused him to leave the school in 1934 to form the Maritime Academy of Music (MAM), taking many of the HCM's teachers and students with him. Ifan Williams was appointed director after Dean left, holding that position for the remainder of the school's history. In 1954 the HCM bought the assets of the MAM and the two schools merged to form the Maritime Conservatory of Music.

== Faculty ==
- Max Weil, head of the violin faculty from 1893–1900
