= León Zuckert =

Canadian musician

León Zuckert (4 May 1904 – 29 May 1992) was a Canadian composer, conductor, arranger, violinist, violist and radio pioneer of Ukrainian descent. He was married to the poet Ella Bobrow, with whom he collaborated on many songs.

== Early life and education ==
Zuckert was born in Poltava, Ukraine into a Jewish family. From 1916 to 1918, Zuckert studied the violin under Boris Brodsky at the Imperial Music Society School in Poltava. During the Russian Revolution, his father was arrested and died in prison; the family moved to Poland.

== Career ==
As a young man in Poland, Zuckert worked in a lumberyard, and then as a violist, playing first in cafes and later in a military orchestra. He moved to Argentina, where he lived for six years, playing music for movie theatres. as well as in a symphony orchestra. He immigrated to Canada in 1929, joining family in Toronto, where he played violin in a radio orchestra for a short time.

Zuckert moved to Winnipeg, Manitoba, where he played in the Winnipeg Symphony Orchestra and in the 1930s hosted a radio show of violin and piano music, "To a Wild Rose", for the CBC (then known as the CRC, or Canadian Radio Commission). He organized a 16-piece ensemble, Los Pamperos, which he conducted on the show, arranging much of the music himself.

Zuckert later toured with a number of orchestras, stage companies and dance bands in Canada and the United States, and played with the Toronto Symphony Orchestra from 1951 to 1956. From 1963 to 1965 and 1967–1969, he was the assistant conductor and principal violinist of the Halifax Symphony Orchestra.

In 1974 he was commissioned by the CBC to compose "Fantasia of Ukrainian Themes", which was premiered as part of the Winnipeg Centennial Festival. He was also commissioned to create an orchestra arrangement of Tevye's Hodel, to be played by an ensemble from the Toronto Symphony Orchestra.

After moving about for much of his life, Zuckert retired to Toronto, where he died 29 May 1992.

== Selected works ==
- "Quintette de la Luna de Mar"
- "The Quetico" – symphonic suite film soundtrack
- Along Gypsy Trails (CD)
- "Fantasia on Ukrainian Themes"
- "In the Gleam of Northern Lights" (oratorio)

== See also ==
- Zuckert
