= Alfred Strombergs =

Latvian-Canadian conductor

Alfred Strombergs (Latvian: Alfrēds Štrombergs; 19 February 1922 in Liepāja – 22 February 2006 in Toronto) was a Canadian conductor, music educator, and pianist of Latvian birth. In 1954 he became a naturalized Canadian citizen. As a conductor he is primarily remembered for his work with the Canadian Opera Company and the Stratford Festival from the late 1950s through the early 1970s. He also notably conducted the world premieres of several orchestral works by composer Tālivaldis Ķeniņš, including his fifth and seventh symphonies.

As an academic Strombergs wrote and lectured about Canadian art song of the 18th and 19th centuries, and served as a voice teacher and director of opera theatre programs at the Maritime Conservatory of Performing Arts (1948-1957), the University of Toronto (1960-1971), and the University of Alberta (1971-1987).

== Education and career ==
From 1940-1943 Strombergs attended the Latvian Academy of Music where he studied composition, conducting, and piano. In 1943 he joined the conducting staff of the ballet and worked as an opera coach at the Latvian National Opera. The following year he became a conductor for operas at that theater. In 1944 he moved to Germany and resided there until 1948 when he immigrated to Canada to join the faculty of the Maritime Academy of Music in Halifax. The following year that institution merged with another conservatory to become the Maritime Conservatory of Performing Arts (MCPA). Strombergs taught at the MCPA until 1957.

In 1949 Stromberg founded the Halifax Symphonette (later known as the Halifax Symphony Orchestra), serving as that symphony's first conductor through 1955. The symphonette was largely formed to be the orchestra for the newly formed Nova Scotia Opera Association and the Halifax Ballet Guild, both organizations for which Stromberg served as music director during his tenure with the Halifax Symphonette.

In the summer of 1953 Stromberg studied conducting with Leonard Bernstein and Lukas Foss at the Tanglewood Music Center. The following Fall he matriculated to The Royal Conservatory of Music (RCM) where he became a composition student of Godfrey Ridout. He became an Associate of the RCM in 1958. In 1960 he became an Associate of the Royal Canadian College of Organists.

In 1957 Strombergs relocated to Toronto to become a vocal coach and conductor for the Canadian Opera Company, a position he held until 1971. He simultaneously worked as the conductor of the Stratford Festival Theatre Orchestra from 1957-1968 and as the head coach of the Royal Conservatory Opera School housed at the University of Toronto from 1960-1971.

In 1971 Strombergs moved to Alberta to assume the post of opera conductor and voice teacher at the University of Alberta (UA). The following year he became the chair of the UA's vocal music department; a position he maintained until his retirement sixteen years later. While working at the UA he was appointed music director of the opera division at the Banff Centre in 1972-1973 and the chorus master of the Edmonton Opera in 1973-1974.

After retiring from teaching in 1987, Strombergs lived in retirement in Toronto until his death in 2006.
