= Jim Fidler =

- Born: Aliquippa, Pennsylvania
- Occupations: Singer, composer, musician, record producer
- Instruments: Accordion, guitar, bodhran, whistles, keyboards, drums
- Website: www.jimfidler.com

Jim Fidler (born in the 1960s in Aliquippa, Pennsylvania) is a singer, producer, and musician living in St. John's, Newfoundland and Labrador.

== Early life and education ==
In the 1960s, Jim and his mother relocated to Newfoundland where he grew up in the diverse Rabbittown section of St. John's. As a youth, Fidler spent a great deal of time along Conception Bay, where he developed an appreciation for Newfoundland's music and culture. Fidler's family found that, as a child, he frequently picked up instruments and mastered them with ease.

Blind since age 9, he continued to develop his talents. By the age of 10, he had formed his own band with friends. He attended school in Halifax, where he continued his musical studies and eventually earned a degree in classical piano and music theory at the Maritime Conservatory of Music in Halifax.

== Career ==
Fidler plays many of the instruments used on his albums including accordion, guitar, whistle, bodhran, and keyboards. The styles of music that he plays range from reggae to bluegrass, Celtic to North African. He formed a successful reggae group called Pressure Drop in the late 1980s and was their drummer and songwriter. Between Pressure Drop and his first solo CD, Fidler arranged some songs on Great Big Sea's debut CD.

In addition to his solo albums, his project Gypsy won awards for Roots/Traditional Album of the Year and Independent Album of the Year in 1996. In 1998 and again in 2000 Jim was featured in the Toronto production of The Needfire. Fidler has collaborated with Great Big Sea, Paddy Keenan, Celtic Connection, the Masterless Men, Atlantic Union and others.

Fidler continues to live in St. John's, Newfoundland with his wife, Lillian, a graphic designer, and their cat, Gypsy.

Fidler is Christina Aguilera's first cousin.

== Discography ==
- Gypsy (1995)
- Friendly Fire (1999)
- Musaik: In This World (2003)
- Midnight Rover (2005)
- Up That River (2011)
