= Quattro Books =

Canadian publisher

Quattro Books, Inc.
- Founded: 2006
- Founder: Allan Briesmaster, Luciano Iacobelli, John Calabro and Beatriz Hausner.
- Country of origin: Canada
- Headquarters location: Centre for Social Innovation, 2nd floor, 720 Bathurst Street, Toronto
- Distribution: LitDistCo
- Publication types: Books (poetry, novellas)
- Imprints: Fourfront Editions
- No. of employees: less than 10
- Official website: www.quattrobooks.ca

Quattro Books is a Canadian small press based in Toronto, Ontario. Quattro publishes both poetry and novellas by established and emerging Canadian writers.

Quattro Books was founded in 2006 by Allan Briesmaster, John Calabro, Beatriz Hausner and Luciano Iacobelli, who collectively ran the reading series, Toronto WordStage, from 2006 to 2008. As of 2014, Allan Briesmaster and Luciano Iacobelli became the sole owners of Quattro. John Calabro left the company in order to accept the role of Co-Executive Director of the Inspire! Toronto International Book Fair, which was hosted at the Metro Toronto Convention Centre November 13 to 16, 2014.

Quattro Books is known as the "Home of the Novella". The publishing mandate of Quattro Books includes fostering the development and popularity of the literary novella.

In 2014, Night Vision by Christopher Levenson was shortlisted for the Governor General's Literary Award for poetry.

== Ken Klonsky Novella Contest ==
Quattro Books runs a yearly novella contest called the “Ken Klonsky Novella Contest”. Previous winners include Carole Giangrande, Terri Favro, Adam Pottle, Binnie Brennan among others.

== Notable authors ==
Authors published by Quattro Books include George Fetherling, Christopher Levenson, Binnie Brennan, Brenda Niskala, Rocco de Giacomo, Carole Giangrande, Sky Gilbert, Michael Wex, Gianna Patriarca, Gale Zoë Garnett, David Silverberg, Susan McCaslin, Lisa Young and Jim Christy.
