= Halifax Camerata Singers =

Canadian chamber choir

The Halifax Camerata Singers is a Canadian chamber choir of 26 to 30 singers, one of a number of singing groups based in Halifax, Nova Scotia. It forms the core of the Symphony Nova Scotia chorus.

== History ==
The choir was founded in 1986 by its continuing artistic director Jeff Joudrey. It performs in concerts throughout Nova Scotia.

In 2010, the choir won the biennial Canadian Broadcasting Corporation National Competition for Canadian Amateur Choirs in the chamber choir category, as well as the Healey Willan Prize for best overall performance.

In 2014, the Camerata Singers performed with Kenny Rogers at his Halifax concert.

In 2016, the group was presented with a Music Nova Scotia award, Classical Album of the Year, for their recording A Time For All Things. In 2017, the recording was nominated for an East Coast Music Award.

In 2023, the choir welcomed new artistic director Joel Tranquilla.

== Recordings ==
- A Time For All Things
