= Holly Mathieson =

New Zealand conductor (born 1981)

Holly Mathieson (born 28 May 1981 in Dunedin) is a New Zealand conductor and music academic.

== Education and early life ==
Mathieson completed her BMus (hons) in composition and analysis from the University of Otago in 2001. She earned an MMus in orchestral conducting from the University of Melbourne Conservatorium. She received a PhD in music from Otago in 2010 on the subject of the iconography of Louis Jullien, Hans Richter and Sir Henry Wood. In 2004, Mathieson conducted the world premiere in 2004 of Anthony Ritchie's The God Boy.

Mathieson is a graduate of the St Petersburg Chamber Philharmonic masterclass (Alexander Polishchuk and Mark Stringer), London Conducting Workshop (Neil Thomson and John Farrer), Dartington International Summer School (John Carewe and Pierre-André Valade), and the Pärnu Music Festival Järvi Academy (Leonid Grin, Neeme Järvi and Paavo Järvi).

== Career ==
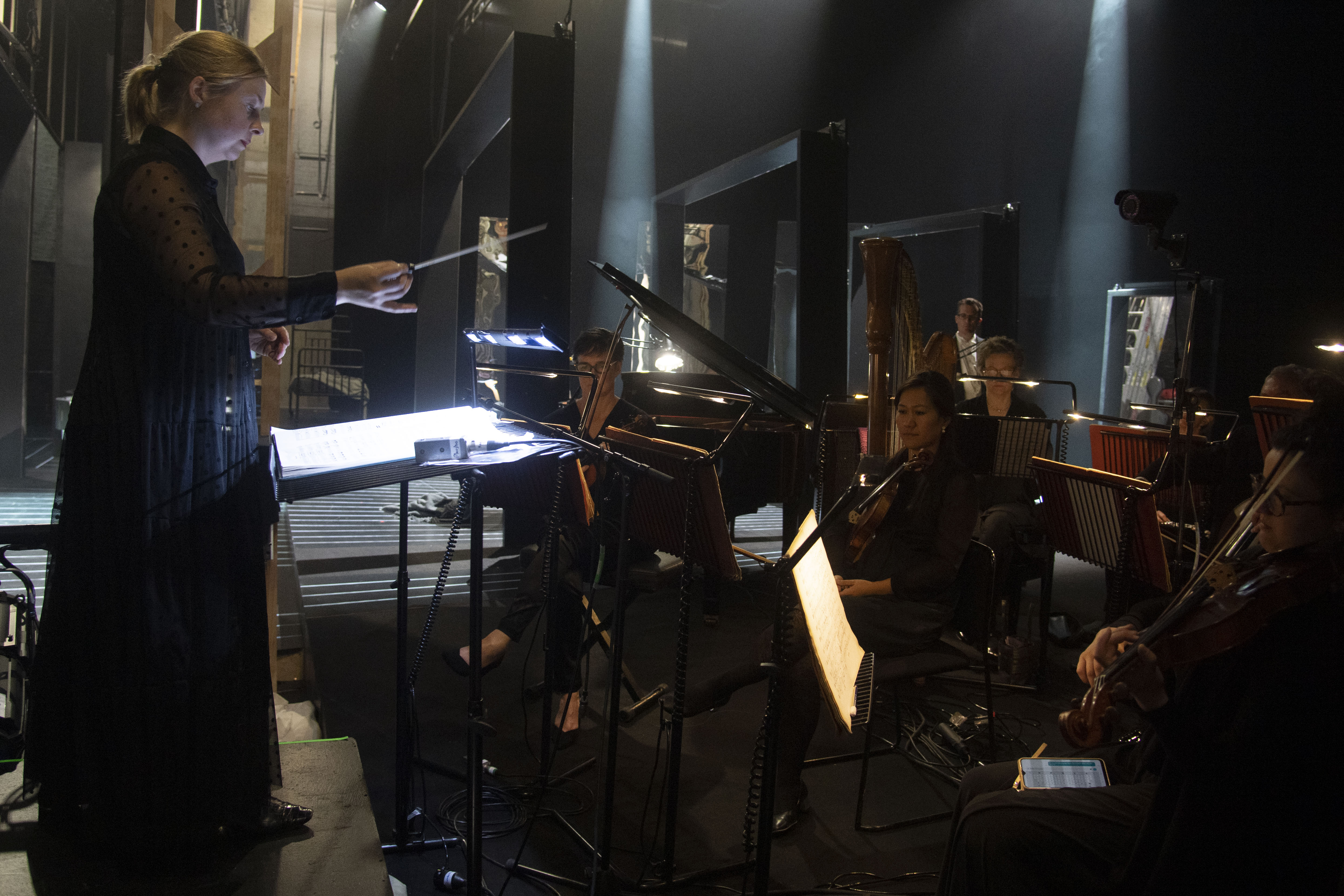
Mathieson conducting a chamber orchestra in the 2019 New Zealand Opera production of Benjamin Britten's The Turn of the Screw.

In the UK, Mathieson became an orchestral librarian with the Philharmonia Orchestra in 2010, while she continued to study conducting privately. With the Philharmonia, she was a conducting assistant to Christoph Von Dohnányi and Esa-Pekka Salonen. She has been an assistant conductor to Marin Alsop in projects with the São Paulo Symphony Orchestra in Paris and Berlin, Orchestra of the Age of Enlightenment and the BBC’s Last Night of the Proms. In 2013, Mathieson became founding artistic director of the Horizont Musik-Kollektiv (Berlin). For 2014-2015, she was a Leverhulme Fellow in conducting at the Royal Conservatoire of Scotland (RCS), mentored by Garry Walker, and assistant to Donald Runnicles at the BBC Scottish Symphony Orchestra. Mathieson has served as associate conductor of Opera Holland Park.

In 2015, Mathieson became Resident Conductor of the National Youth Orchestra of Scotland Junior Orchestra. Between 2015 and 2017, Mathieson was Vocal Director and Lecturer in Performance at Goldsmiths, University of London. From 2016 to 2018, Mathieson was assistant conductor of the Royal Scottish National Orchestra. In 2018, Mathieson was named co-artistic director of the Nevis Ensemble, alongside Jon Hargreaves, her husband. With the Royal Liverpool Philharmonic Orchestra and Isata Kanneh-Mason, Mathieson has recorded music of Clara Schumann commercially for Decca Classics.

In 2018, Mathieson first guest-conducted Symphony Nova Scotia, as one of two finalist candidates for the post of music director with the orchestra. She returned in November 2019 for a further guest-conducting engagement. In December 2019, Symphony Nova Scotia announced the appointment of Mathieson as its next music director, effective January 2020, with an initial contract of three years. This appointment marks her first orchestral music directorship. Mathieson is the first female conductor to be named music director of Symphony Nova Scotia. Mathieson is scheduled to step down from her music director position at the end of the 2024-2025 season.

Mathieson and Hargreaves reside in Glasgow.

In 2021, she returned New Zealand to conduct the New Zealand Symphony Orchestra for the first time, in concerts with the metal band Alien Weaponry.

== Awards ==
- 2009: Adrienne, Lady Stewart and the NZ Arts Foundation recipient

Cultural offices
Preceded by Bernhard Gueller	Music Director, Symphony Nova Scotia; 2020–present	Succeeded by incumbent
