= Robert Tempest (composer) =

American composer

Robert Tempest (1868, Philadelphia – March 21, 1955, Carlisle, Pennsylvania) was an American composer and concert pianist. He studied piano in his native city with Carl Von Amsburg and Edward Zerdebely. His papers are held in the collection of the Cumberland County Historical Society. He was known for his exceptional gift for memorization, with a July 1898 article in The Musician reporting he had more than 1800 works in his performance repertoire, all of which he could play from memory.

As early as October 1887 Tempest was giving concerts at Philadelphia's Assembly Hall. He played in concerts at other Philadelphia venues, such as Musical Fund Hall, Hermann's Broad Street Theatre, and the Haseltine Galleries. With the violinist Edwin Brill he gave a recital at the Pennsylvania Academy of the Fine Arts in December 1889. In 1890 he performed in concerts with the soprano Marie Kunkel and pianist Max Weil. As part of the chamber group The Schumann Club, he performed in chamber music concerts at the New Century Club. In 1895 he gave a public recital sponsored by the Philadelphia piano manufacturer CJ Heppe & Son.

In January 1896 Tempest was a soloist with the Germania Orchestra (precursor to the Philadelphia Orchestra), playing Franz Liszt's Piano Concerto No. 1. In April 1896 he gave a recital at Natatorium Hall, Broad Street that consisted of only music by Frédéric Chopin. In November 1896 he performed Chopin's Piano Concerto No. 1 with the Germania Orchestra at Musical Fund Hall. He was heard with that orchestra again February 1897, playing Karl Goldmark's piano concerto and works by Robert Schumann. He performed at the Grand Opera House in Wilmington, Delaware on July 1, 1897.

In August 1899 Tempest donated several items to the museum at Independence Hall, among them a carved powder horn owned by Edward Braddock. He frequently attended the salons hosted by baritone Giuseppe Del Puente.

Tempest wrote his first compositions at the age of five. In his youth, he would go to Laurel Hill Cemetery to site and compose. A concerts of his art songs and instrumental music was given at the New Century Club in December 1895.
