= Binnie Brennan =

Canadian writer and musician

Binnie Brennan (born 1961) is a Canadian writer and classical violinist based in Nova Scotia. Her 2009 novella Harbour View was co-winner of the Ken Klonsky Novella Prize in 2009.

== Biography ==
Born in Toronto, in 1961, Brennan began her musical training at the age of five, and started performing at the age of 14. She graduated from the Queen's University School of Music, continuing her studies in Vienna.

Brennan is based in Halifax, Nova Scotia, where she has performed as a violinist with Symphony Nova Scotia since 1989. Her short fiction was a finalist for the Journey Prize twice, and was long-listed for CBC Canada Writes.

She is the author of three fiction books. Her 2009 book Harbour View was her first novella, published by Quattro Books. It was co-winner of the Ken Klonsky Novella Prize in 2009.

== Publications ==
- Brennan, Binnie (2009). Harbour View. Toronto: Quattro Books. ISBN 978-0-9810-1864-5.
- — (2012). A Certain Grace. Toronto: Quattro Books. ISBN 978-1-9268-0284-8.
- — (2014). Like Any Other Monday. Kentville, N.S.: Gaspereau Press. ISBN 978-1-5544-7138-6.
