= Ifan Williams, Sr. =

Welsh-born Canadian violinist (1889–1957)

Ifan Williams (November 1889, Carmarthen, Wales - September 1957, London) was a Canadian violinist, conductor, and music educator of Welsh birth. He should not be confused with his son, the cellist Ifan Williams (b. 1945, Halifax, Nova Scotia).

== Education and career ==
Ifan Williams was trained as a musician at the Royal Academy of Music in London where he was the first violinist of the RAM's string quartet and concertmaster of the school's orchestra. He was the winner of numerous violin competitions and music scholarships, and following graduation worked as a concert violinist in London and the surrounding provinces. He also worked as an ensemble musician in the London Symphony Orchestra (LSO) and the orchestra of the Royal Opera House, Covent Garden, and as a member of the Blagrove String Quartette. His brother, the cellist Geraint Williams, was also a member of the LSO.

In 1920 Williams immigrated to Canada; settling in Halifax, Nova Scotia where he ultimately became a naturalized Canadian. He was the head of the string program at the Maritime Conservatory of Performing Arts (then known as the Halifax Conservatory) from 1920 to 1934; and then was promoted to director of the conservatory; a post he held from 1934 until his death in 1957. He was also the conductor of conservatory's orchestra during his tenure at the school.

In 1922 Williams founded the Halifax Choral Society and was that group's first conductor. In 1935 he founded the Halifax Music Festival.
