= Beaux Arts Building =

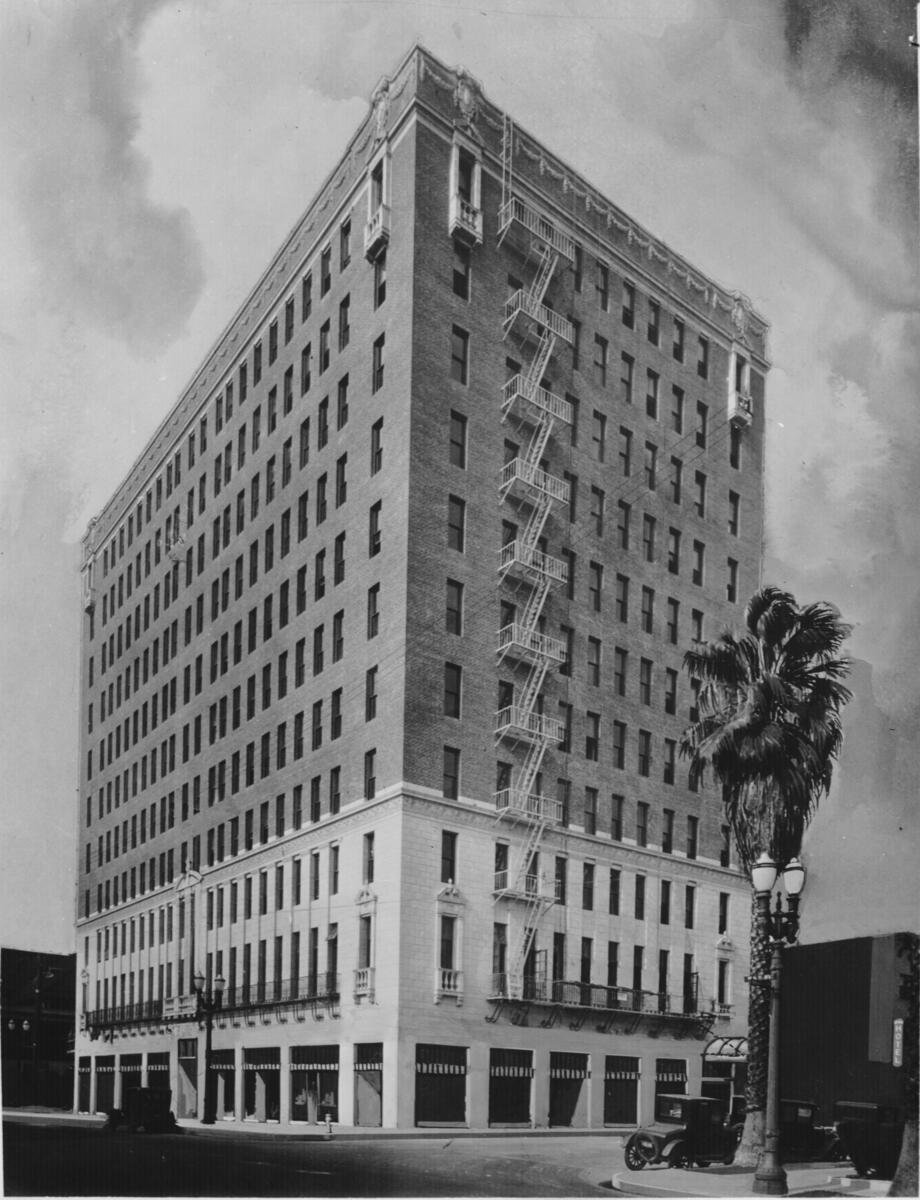
- View in 1927
- Interactive map of the Beaux Arts Building area
- Alternative names: Crescent Arms (since 1992)

General information
- Type: initially, studio building and auditorium; subsequently, insurance company offices; since 1992, senior housing
- Architectural style: Beaux-Arts
- Location: 1709 West 8th Street, Los Angeles, California, U.S.
- Coordinates: 34.0532°N 118.2736°W
- Construction started: June 1926
- Inaugurated: February 16, 1927
- Cost: US$1,000,000
- Owner: Abode Communities

Technical details
- Floor count: 11

Design and construction
- Architects: Stanton, Reed and Hibbard
- Main contractor: Forve-Pettebone

Website
- abodecommunities.org/crescent-arms-properties/

The Beaux Arts Building (since 1992, Crescent Arms) is a historic American building on Eighth at Beacon Streets in the Playa Vista neighborhood of Los Angeles, California. Constructed in 1927, in the Beaux-Arts style, it was completed in less than a year, at a cost of US$1,000,000. It was designed as a studio building and auditorium, devoted entirely to music and the allied fine arts. A lyre over the dramatic entrance identified its original musical and dramatic purpose.

It later became an office building for an insurance company. Vacant by the early 1990s, it was converted into senior housing in 1992 and renamed Crescent Arms.

== History ==
In 1926, Max Weil was living in Los Angeles and conceived the idea of building there one of the largest and finest studio buildings in the country. A temporary office of the building, at 816 South Figueroa Street was used while the Beaux Arts Building was under construction. Groundbreaking occurred in June 1926 to a design by Stanton, Reed and Hibbard, architects, with Forve-Pettebone Company in charge of construction. The Beaux Arts Building opened on February 16, 1927, with Weil serving as Studio and Auditorium Director.

Later, it was converted into offices for an insurance company. Vacant by the early 1990s, the Beaux Arts Building was renamed "Crescent Arms" when it was renovated and converted by the Santa Monica-based Crescent Bay Company, into senior housing units to a design by Killefer Flammang Architects. The Crescent Arms project team was composed of several organizations, including the Crescent Bay Company, the Los Angeles Neighborhood Development Corporation, Morley Construction Company, and Killefer Flammang Purtill architects.

== Architecture and fittings ==
=== Beaux Arts Building ===
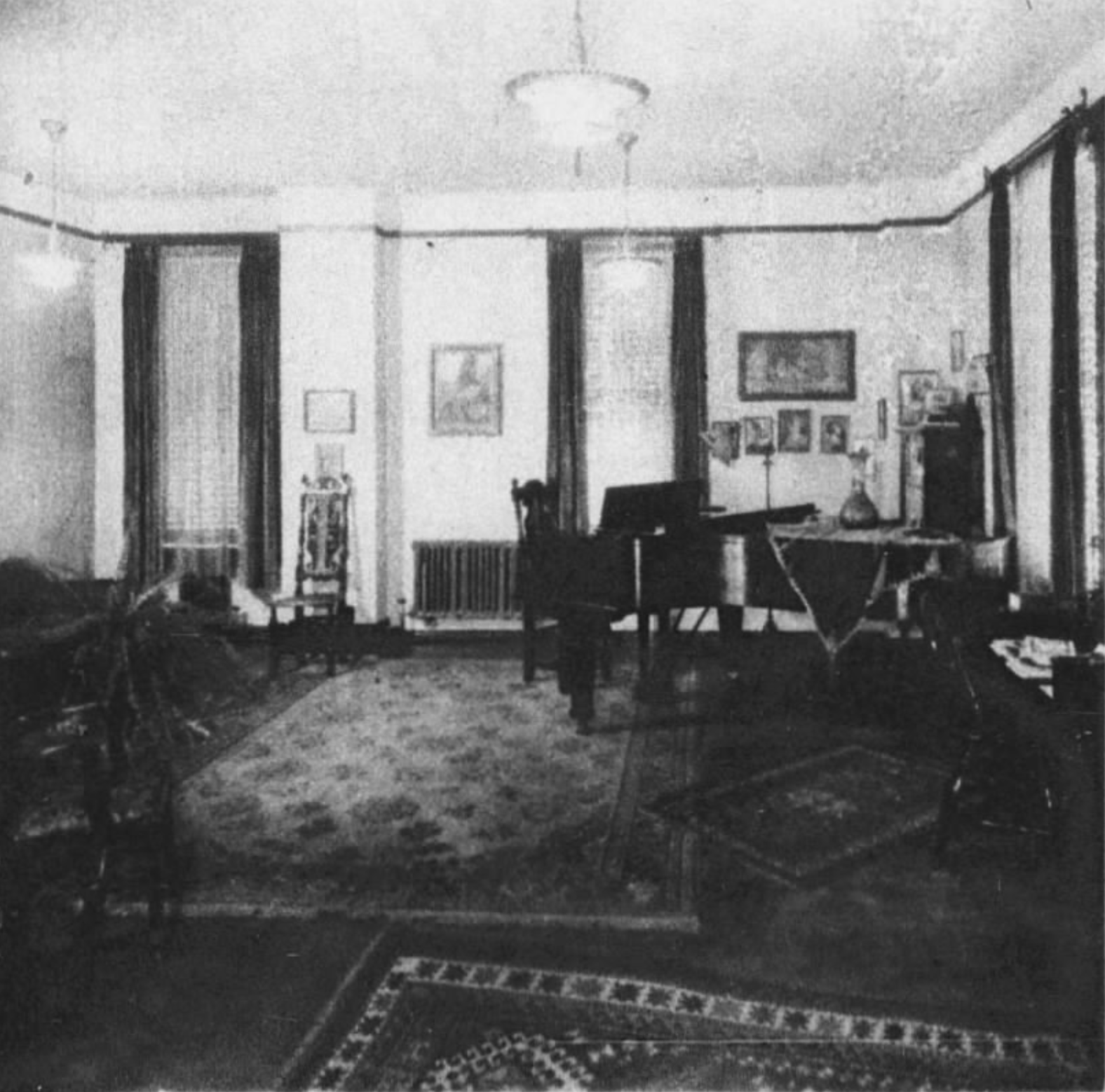
A studio, 1927

The structure was constructed to the height limits of that day, but instead of the usual thirteen stories of height limit buildings, it had eleven stories, sacrificing two stories to give additional height to the rooms.

There was a recital hall on the ground floor, with entrance on Beacon street. The hall was suitable for recitals, chamber music concerts, lectures and orchestral and dramatic performances. The bowl-shaped auditorium, with a large stage and pipe organ, contained 541 opera chairs on the main floor and balcony. Each wing of the building contained rehearsal halls on the second floor, accommodating approximately 150 persons. The halls were suitable for rehearsals, lectures or informal social affairs. In addition, the building was equipped with kitchen facilities. The 200 or more sound proof studios under the same roof offered facilities for artists and teachers.

Provision was made for free parking space on property of the owners of the building and adjoining the Beaux Arts Building on the north.

=== Crescent Arms ===
After renovation and conversion into senior housing units, 241 apartments became available for occupancy January 28, 1992. Retrofitting and other modifications occurred in 1994, reducing the number of units to 231 apartments. Another renovation by the Santa Monica-based architecture firm of Van Tilburg, Banvard & Soderbergh occurred two years later. A 1998 renovation offered nine floor plans and arched windows. Some of the one and two-bedroom units included double main suites and high ceiling. Other units offered the main entrance a half flight up from ground level with living space a half flight below.
