= Lūcija Garūta =

Latvian pianist and composer

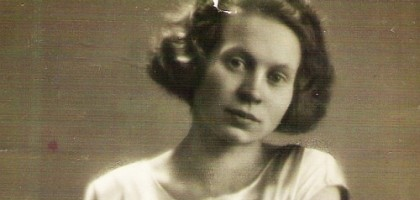
- Born: 14 May 1902; Riga, Russian Empire (now Latvia)
- Died: 15 February 1977 (aged 74); Riga, Latvian SSR, Soviet Union
- Education: Latvian State Conservatory, Ecole Normale de Musique
- Occupations: Pianist, composer
- Known for: Music
- Notable work: Dievs, Tava zeme deg! (God, your land is burning!)

Lūcija Garūta (14 May 1902 – 15 February 1977) was a Latvian pianist, poet and composer. She is best known for composing the cantata Dievs, Tava zeme deg! in 1943.

== Life and career ==
Lūcija Garūta was born in Riga (at the time in the Russian Empire) to the family of an accountant. From 1919 to 1925, she studied at the Latvian Conservatory with professor Jāzeps Vītols for piano and others, including Jānis Mediņš Jēkabs Mediņš and Jēkabs Kārkliņš. During her studies she was the pianist répétiteur at the Latvian National Opera.

After graduation, she worked at Riga Radio from 1925 to 1926. In 1926, she took a position teaching music theory and piano at the Jāzeps Mediņš School of Music. That year, she also continued her studies with Alfred Cortot, Isidor Philipp and Paul Le Flem and in 1928 studied composition with Paul Dukas at the Paris École Normale de Musique. In 1926, she made her debut in Paris, and began composing, holding concerts with singers Milda Brehmane-Štengele, Ādolfs Kaktiņš and Mariss Vētra, violinist Rūdolfs Miķelsons and cellist Atis Teihmanis. In 1939, she served on the Latvian music promotion association's board of directors. In the 1920s and 1930s, Lūcija Garūta was one of the most active pianists both as a soloist and accompanist, performing in Riga and throughout Latvia. In total, Garūta performed with more than 100 musicians in chamber music concerts.

In 1940, shortly before the Soviet occupation of Latvia took place, Garūta took a position teaching composition and music theory at the Latvian Conservatory, where she was elected to professor in 1960. Illness ended her performing career in the late 1940s but she continued to teach.

Lūcija Garūta died in 1977 in Riga (at the time Latvian SSR, Soviet Union) and was buried at the 1st Riga Forest Cemetery. Since 2002, the bi-annual International Young Pianists Competition of Lūcija Garūta has been held in Latvia in her memory.

== God, your land is burning! ==
Garūta's 1943 cantata Dievs, Tava zeme deg! (God, your land is burning!) is included in the musical category of the Latvian Cultural Canon, recognized as one of the most important Latvian musical pieces of all time. The lyrics were written by Andrejs Eglītis for a contest themed "A Latvian prayer to God".

The musical piece was written during the German occupation of Latvia during World War II. A tape of its premiere on 15 March 1944 with Garūta playing the organ, although recorded at the St. Gertrude Old Church in Riga, is said to have captured the sounds of battle outside the Riga Dome Cathedral. The premiere featured massed choirs conducted by Teodors Reiters while the composer played the Riga Cathedral pipe organ. Until the return of Soviet rule in late 1944, the work was performed more than ten times at the St. Gertrude Old Church and the St. Anne Church of Liepāja.

The cantata was banned under the Soviet occupation of Latvia and recordings were considered destroyed. Despite this, in 1980, Latvian exile composer Longins Apkalns restored the original recording of 1944 by using fragments from the German Radio Archives and thus Dievs, Tava zeme deg! was once again played on May 8, 1982 in Stockholm for the first time since WWII, after which the work became well known among the Latvian exile diaspora.

During the Singing Revolution the piece was rehabilitated and in 1990, after a 46-year-long silence, it was again performed publicly in Latvia at the final concert of the 20th Latvian Song Festival with over ten thousand singers. Since then, Garūta's work has been performed domestically and in Japan, Germany and other countries.

== Works ==
Selected works include:

- Dievs, tava zeme deg! (1943) for soloists, chorus and organ
- Piano Concerto in F sharp minor (1952)
- Prelude for piano in C sharp minor
- Prelude for piano in E Major
- Andante Tranquillo, piano trio in B

=== Recordings ===
Her works have been recorded and issued on media, including:

- Latvian Patriotic Cantatas, Audio CD (May 18, 1999), Riga Recording, ASIN: B00000J8QK
- Dievs, Tava zeme deg! (January 1, 2003) Baltic Records Group, ASIN: B000QZX3VM
- Lucija Garuta: Sacred Love songs Julija Vasilljeva, Maris Skuja Skani 2023
