= Harry Dean (musician) =

Canadian conductor, pianist, organist and music educator

Harry Dean (22 February 1879 – 30 October 1955) was a Canadian conductor, pianist, organist, and music educator of English birth. He was a particularly influential figure within the field of music education in Halifax, notably founding the Maritime Academy of Music and the Nova Scotia Registered Music Teachers' Association. Among his important students were Howard Brown, Harold Hamer, Georges and Carl Little, Gordon MacPherson, Jocelyn Pritchard, and Marguerita Spencer.

== Life ==
Born in Yorkshire, Dean began his musical education in his native country with Tobias Matthay. He then pursued studies at the Leipzig Conservatory where he was a pupil of Robert Teichmüller (piano) and Paul Homeyer (organ). In 1906 he joined the faculty of the Halifax Conservatory of Music (HCM) as head of the school's keyboard and theory department. Two years later he was promoted to director of the school, serving in that post for the next 26 years. He also worked as a professor at Dalhousie University from 1909 to 1932. From 1907 to 1917 he was the conductor of the Orpheus Club and from 1919 to 1954 he conducted the Halifax Philharmonic Society. He also was the organist and choirmaster at Fort Massey United Church from 1906 to 1953.

In 1934 Dean left the HCM after disputes with the school's board, founding his own school, the Maritime Academy of Music (MAM). Many of the HCM's faculty and students went with him when he started the academy. Under his leadership the school quickly became the biggest music school in Halifax, growing to more than 1000 pupils. In 1954 the HCM bought the assets of the MAM and the two schools merged to form the Maritime Conservatory of Music (now Maritime Conservatory of Performing Arts).

In 1937 Dean founded the Nova Scotia Registered Music Teachers' Association, serving as the organizations president in 1937-1938 and again in 1945-1946 and 1949–1951. He was also active as a recitalist and accompanist throughout his career. He died in Halifax in 1955 at the age of 76.
