= Howard Brown (pianist) =

Canadian musician

Howard Fuller Brown (24 July 1920 in Arkona, Ontario – 2001) was a Canadian pianist, harpsichordist, and music educator, and was active as a concert pianist and recitalist in Atlantic Canada during the mid-twentieth century, appearing as a soloist with many important Canadian symphony orchestras. He also performed on numerous broadcasts with CBC Radio.

A graduate of The Royal Conservatory of Music (Associate diploma, 1939), the University of Toronto (B.A., 1943; B.Mus., 946), and the University of Michigan (MA in music literature, 1954), Brown studied under such teachers as Harry Dean, Lubka Kolessa, Boris Roubakine, Leo Smith, Arnold Walter, and Healey Willan. He later studied in England in 1957 through a grant from the Royal Society of Canada with harpsichordist Valda Aveling and pianist Harold Craxton.

Brown served as the chair of the piano faculty at both Maritime Conservatory of Music (1949–1950) and Mount Allison University (1950–1953) before becoming the head of the music department at the latter university from 1953 to 1967. He was then head of the music department at Bishop's University from 1967 to 1983, and where he was made a professor emeritus upon his retirement in 1984.
