= Dalhousie Arts Centre =

Arts centre in Halifax, Canada

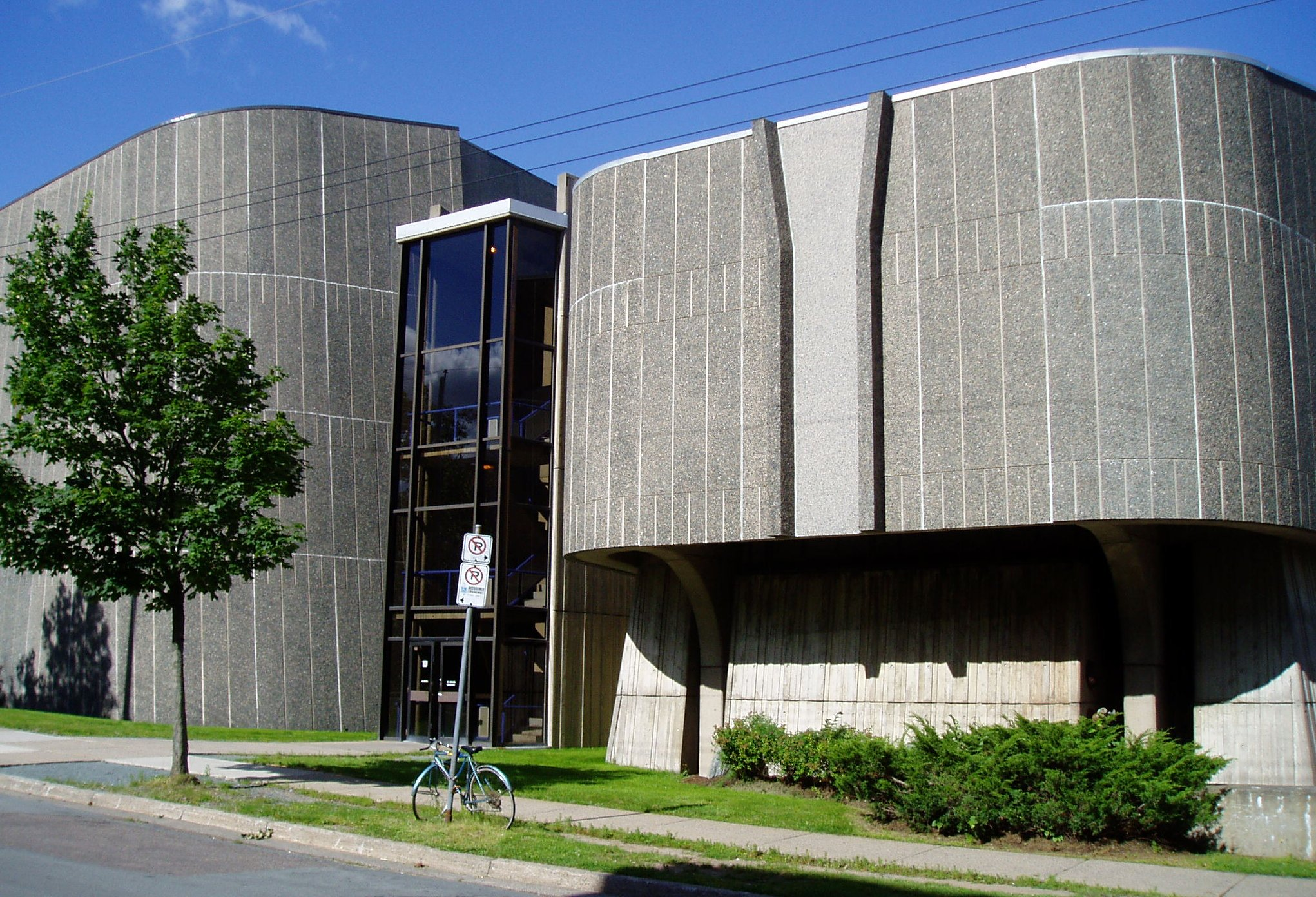
- Interactive map of Dalhousie Arts Centre
- Address: 6101 University Avenue; Halifax, Nova Scotia; B3H 4R2
- Location: Dalhousie University
- Coordinates: 44°38′16″N 63°35′19″W
- Type: Performing arts centre

Construction
- Built: 1968-1971
- Opened: 1971
- Expanded: 2023
- Cost: $5.5 million CAD

Website
- artscentre.dal.ca

The Dalhousie Arts Centre, at Dalhousie University in Halifax, Nova Scotia, contains a number of theatres (including an outdoor rooftop theatre), Dalhousie Art Gallery, classrooms, and a sculpture garden. It remains the premier performing arts venue in Halifax. It was opened officially in November 1971, and is also home to Dalhousie's Fountain School of Performing Arts.

The striking modern architecture was done by C.A.E. Fowler & Company (Charles Fowler) of Halifax, with significant contributions by the Japanese educator Junji Mikawa, who worked for Fowler at the time. The interior was designed mainly by Andy Lynch, who would later have his own firm in the city, and who drew inspiration from the work of Alvar Aalto.

== Performance spaces ==
- Rebecca Cohn Auditorium - 1,023-seat multipurpose concert hall and theatre, home to Symphony Nova Scotia. It is the largest soft-seat venue in Halifax.
- Joseph Strug Concert Hall - 300-seat chamber music hall, opened in 2023 as part of a major expansion of the building.
- Sir James Dunn Theatre - 198-seat proscenium theatre equipped with stadium seating, vomitoriums, and a fly tower.
- David Mack Murray Studio Theatre (Studio 1) - 80-seat black box theatre with lighting grid and catwalks.
- Elsie MacAloney Room - 90-seat lecture and recital hall.
- Open-air rooftop theatre (closed)

All five operating facilities are named for benefactors.

== See also ==
- List of concert halls
