= Max Weil =

American violinist, conductor, composer and music educator

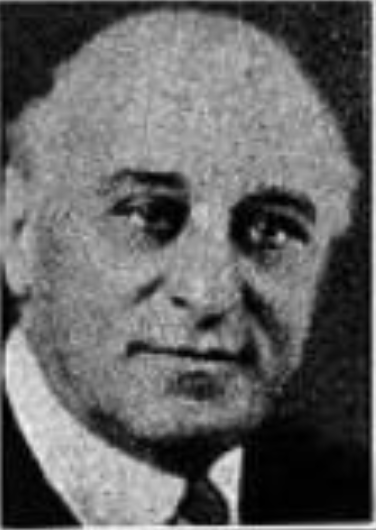
Max Weil. Photo published in the May 1927 issue of Musical West and Northwest Musician.

Max Weil (November 21, 1869 — February 18, 1944) was an American violinist, conductor, composer, and music educator. He is chiefly remembered for his contributions to music in the city of Halifax, Nova Scotia in Canada.

Born and raised in Philadelphia, Weil was educated as a violinist in Germany over a four year period at the Leipzig Conservatory in the late 1880s. After graduating from that institution in 1890, he began his career as a concert violinist and chamber musician in his native city before working as a violinist in the New York Symphony Orchestra in 1891-1892. In the 1892-1893 season he spent 26 weeks performing as the second violinist in George Lehmann's Schumann Quartette; mainly in concerts in Denver, Colorado. He returned briefly to Philadelphia in 1893 before joining the violin faculty of the Halifax Conservatory of Music and the staff of the associated Halifax Ladies' College in September 1893. He served as the head of the violin faculty at that school until his resignation in 1900 when he founded the Weil School of Music in Halifax; a school he operated until 1908.

Weil was a prominent and important conductor in Halifax from 1893-1908. He was appointed music director of the Haydn Quintette Club in 1893, a post he held for many years. In 1897 he founded the Halifax Symphony Orchestra, a professional orchestra he conducted for eleven seasons of concerts. He was also active as a conductor and producer of operas in Halifax.

In 1908 Weil left Canada to become first chair of the second violin section of the Minneapolis Symphony Orchestra. During that time he also was the second violinist in the Sansone Quartet, a string quartet based in Saint Paul, Minnesota that was founded by the Naples born composer and violinist Errico Sansone (b. 1859). He returned to Canada in late 1912 when he was appointed conductor of the Calgary Symphony Orchestra, a post he held until shortly after the outbreak of World War I. He then relocated to Los Angeles where he had a career in real estate. He died in that city in 1944 at the age of 74.

== Early life and career ==
Max Weil was born in Philadelphia, Pennsylvania on November 21, 1869. His parents were Samuel Weil and Bertha Weil (née Simon). His family was Jewish.

Weil trained as a violinist in Germany. He graduated from the Leipzig Conservatory (now the University of Music and Theatre Leipzig) in 1890 after four years of study where his main concentration was in violin performance, but where he also trained as a pianist. There he was a pupil of violinists Adolf Brodsky and Hans Sitt.

After returning to the United States, Weil gave his first public performance at the Reform Congregation Keneseth Israel (RCKI) in Philadelphia where he played as a soloist during religious services in September 1890. He gave a recital with the pianist Robert Tempest and soprano Marie Kunkel at the Pennsylvania Academy of the Fine Arts in November 1890, and that same month performed violin duo works with Harry Herzberg in the RCKI's chamber music concert series. He continued to perform regularly during concerts, religious services, and public events such as funerals and weddings at the RCKI in 1891.

On March 12, 1891, Weil made his New York recital debut at Steinway Hall. His repertoire in that concert included violin concertos by Louis Spohr and the Polonaise de Concert, Op. 4 by Henryk Wieniawski. He also performed songs with tenor Henry Duzensi in that concert and with pianist Max Liebling. In June 1891 he was the violin soloist in a concert given at Philadelphia's Mercantile Hall at 847 N. Franklin St in which he performed with the band of the 3rd U.S. Infantry Regiment under conductor Herman Solomon. On October 21, 1891, he performed in concert with contralto Weda Cook (1867–1937), pianist Maurits Leefson (1861-1926), and cellist Rudolph Hennig (1845-1904) at the Pennsylvania Academy of the Fine Arts.

At the end of October 1891 Weil left Philadelphia to begin a position as violinist in the New York Symphony Orchestra under conductor Walter Damrosch. He played with that orchestra for two years. During that time he periodically returned to Philadelphia to perform in concerts. As part of the Philadelphia chamber group The Schumann Club, he performed in chamber music concerts at the New Century Club in 1892 with Robert Tempest, Weda Cook, and tenor Nicholas Douty. He also concurrently taught violin in Philadelphia, operating a violin studio at 1796 Chestnut St, and was the second violinist in George Lehmann's string quartet whose other members included violist Paul Stoeving (1861-1948) and cellist Franz Meyer. With this latter group he performed in 26 weeks of chamber music concerts in the 1892-1893 season.

== Music educator, violinist, and conductor in Halifax ==
The Canadian Encyclopedia states that Max Weil was appointed head of the violin department at the Halifax Conservatory of Music in c. 1892. However, newspaper reports from Philadelphia indicate a different timeline. The Philadelphia Jewish Exponent reports that Weil was in Denver, Colorado performing with Lehmann's Schumann Quartette until he returned to Philadelphia in early May 1893. That same paper reported that he remained in Philadelphia until mid-September 1893 when he left for Halifax, Nova Scotia to take a new position as a music instructor at the "Women's College of Halifax". When returning to the United States for a vacation in September 1894, it was reported that Weil would return to his post as "director and instructor of music at the Ladies' College in Halifax, Nova Scotia."

The Halifax Ladies' College was closely affiliated with Halifax Conservatory of Music, and was managed by the same governing board from the time both institutions were concurrently co-established in 1887 by the minister Robert Laning until 1952. While some sources refer to them as separate but related entities, other sources refer to the schools as a single organization under the title Halifax Ladies College and Conservatory of Music. Given the discrepancy between sources in relation to the schools being a single unified institution, and two separate institutions, its possible Weil worked for one or both institutions. However, multiple sources indicate Weil was the head of the violin faculty at the Halifax Conservatory of Music in the 1890s until his resignation in 1900. He left the school to establish his own music school in Halifax, the Weil School of Music, which he operated from 1900-1908. He was responsible for bringing several excellent music teachers to the city of Halifax.

Weil was a prominent conductor in Halifax, Nova Scotia from 1893-1908. Canadian music historian Phyllis Blakeley described as "a conductor of energy, with a capacity for hard work, a quick eye, and an unerring ear." In 1893 Weil succeeded Heinrich Klingenfeld as director of the Haydn Quintette Club; a music group which presented a series of symphony concerts in the city among other music events. In 1897 he founded the Halifax Symphony Orchestra; a professional orchestra he conducted for eleven seasons of concerts. Weil also conducted and produced operas in Halifax, beginning with a production of Friedrich von Flotow's Martha in 1896. Other operas he produced and conducted in the city included Charles Gounod's Faust and Michael William Balfe's The Bohemian Girl.

Weil was also active as a composer of orchestral music.

== Later life and career ==
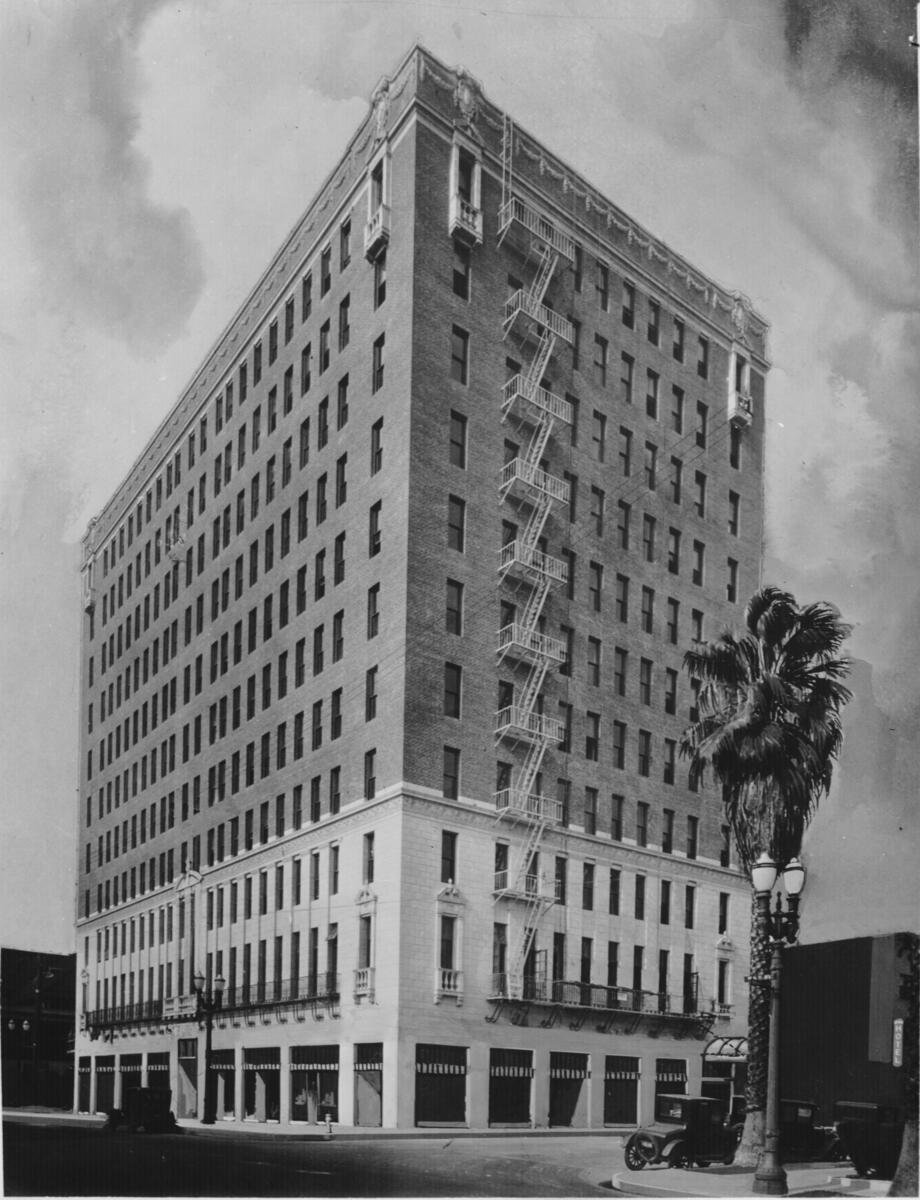
Beaux Arts Building, Los Angeles in 1927

In 1908 Weil left Canada to take a position as first chair of the second violin section of the Minneapolis Symphony Orchestra. He taught music at Eleanor Miller's School of Expression in Saint Paul, Minnesota. During that time he also was the second violinist in the Sansone Quartet, a string quartet based in Saint Paul, Minnesota that was founded by the Naples born composer and violinst Errico Sansone (b. 1859).

In late 1912 he returned to Canada when he was appointed conductor of the Calgary Symphony Orchestra, making his debut with the orchestra in a concert on January 27, 1913. In August 1914 World War I began, and soon after Weil left Canada for Los Angeles; a decision which The Canadian Encyclopedia attributed to his German heritage; even though Weil was born and raised in Philadelphia and was only trained as a musician in Germany.

In Los Angeles, Weil ultimately had a career in real estate. He was responsible for the building of the Beaux Arts Building in Los Angeles, a structure completed in 1927.

He died in that city on February 18, 1944, at the age of 74.
