= Maritime Academy of Music =

Canadian music conservatory

The Maritime Academy of Music (MAM) was a Canadian music conservatory in Halifax, Nova Scotia that offered courses in higher education in music during the first half of the 20th century. The school's primarary facilities were located on Henry Street, but it also utilized other buildings in various parts of the city. In addition to courses in music, the school also offered classes in ballet and Scottish highland dance. The school worked in partnership with Dalhousie University through which the academy granted 2 year licentiate diplomas and 4 year Bachelor of Music degrees.

== History ==
The MAM was founded in 1934 by organist and conductor Harry Dean who was the school's sole director. Dean had been the director of the Halifax Conservatory of Music (HCM) since 1906. He left the HCM after a disagreement with that school's board of directors, taking many of their students and faculty to start the MAM. Under his leadership the school grew to be the biggest music school in Halifax, with more than 1000 pupils. In 1935, Canada's first courses in the psychology of music were taught there by Cyril O'Brien.

In 1954 the HCM bought the assets of the MAM and the two schools merged to form the Maritime Conservatory of Music (now Maritime Conservatory of Performing Arts).
