= Mariss Vētra =

Latvian opera singer, stage director, educator, and writer

Mariss Vētra (19 July 1901 – 24 December 1965) was a Latvian opera singer, stage director, educator, and writer.

== Biography ==
Mariss Vētra (known as Morics Blumbergs till 1922) was born on 19 July 1901, at Dārta Estate of Tirza Civic Parish in the present-day Republic of Latvia (in 1901 a part of the Russian Empire). He was one of four children in a farming family. His father, Jēkabs Blumbergs, rented the estate from the local baron Alfred von Zeimern. His mother was Emma Blumberga, née Perlbach. His brother was Nikolajs, who studied medicine, became a lecturer at the University of Latvia, and was one of the founders of the Baltic University). His sisters were Austra (later a chemist) and Maiga (later an architect). After 1906, the family lived in Rīga.

=== Early life ===
Vētra studied at the Alexander Classical School of Riga, which during World War I was evacuated to Dorpat (now Tartu, Estonia). He later studied at the 2nd Classical School of Riga, from which he graduated in 1919. During his studies, Vētra worked as a clerk at the Statistics Bureau. His position at Bureau allowed to save his mother from being shot in 1919 during the temporary soviet government of Pēteris Stučka.

In June 1919, Vētra joined the new Latvian Army and took part in the Latvian War of Independence. In September 1919, as a soldier, he was admitted to the recently formed Conservatoire of Latvia. In October 1919, both German and Russian troops were approaching Rīga and his regiment fought its first battles. Vētra was wounded near Babīte. He also participated in liberation of Jelgava.

=== 1920–1930 ===
In January 1920, and Vētra began his studies at the new Conservatoire of Latvia with Professor Pauls Sakss. At the same time he entered the Faculty of History and Philosophy of the University of Latvia; however, for lack of time, he did not study there, although he audited some lectures. To earn his living, he worked at the Board of Railway. In 1921, Vētra gave a concert in Liepāja.

In 1922, Vētra urged his family to change their surname from Blumbergs to Vētra; Morics changed his first name to Mariss.

During his studies, in September 1922, Mariss Vētra became the premier of the recently founded opera of Liepāja, until the spring of 1923 singing with success in more than 70 performances. The Latvian National Opera took interest in him and invited him to give guest performances. In May 1923, Vētragave a guest performance as Don Jose in the Verdi opera "Carmen". Since the autumn of 1923, he was already a full-fledged soloist of the National Opera.

In the spring of 1924, Vētra graduated from the Conservatoire of Latvia, in September he sang at the National Opera, but in October, aided by the Culture Foundation of Latvia, went to Italy, and until the spring of 1926 improved his singing skills with the professors of Naples and Rome. Short of money, he also worked as a foreign correspondent for newspapers "Latvijas Vēstnesis" and "Rīgas Ziņas".

From the autumn of 1926 until the spring of 1928. Vētra was the soloist of the National Opera of Latvia. In June 1928, Vētra went on tour to the Vienna Opera; in Autumn he concluded a contract with the Opera of Frankfurt am Main, where he worked for two seasons; however, he was obliged to discharge the contract, as he was drafted in the army to serve the missing months. In July 1930, he returned to Riga, joined the military service and served till February 1931 as a sergeant of an artillery regiment. The National Opera concluded a contract for separate performances.

At that time Vētra met the ballet-dancer Irene Veil in Germany. They became a couple and he brought her to Rīga. They had two sons, Pēteris and Andrejs.

=== 1930–1939 ===
In August 1930, Vētra became ill and sought a cure at a sanatorium; he had his tonsils removed. After that Vētra returned to the military service. On October 2, while singing Lensky in the opera "Eugen Onegin", he lost his voice. The management of the Opera had forgotten to recall him in time from the service, and after some heavy load, he had arrived running for the performance. The reviewer Ernests Brusubārda wrote a destructive critique, declaring that Mariss Vētra is a tenor lacking a sense of duty. On October 25 Vētra publicly slapped him. Because of this, the Director Prande fired Vētra, although many persons defended him.

Nonetheless Vētra continued performing. He performed in a number of solo concerts and had material written for him by composers such as Jāzeps Vītols, Jēkabs Poruks, Jānis Zālītis, Lūcija Garūta, Jānis Ķepītis and Alberts Jērums.

At the end of 1930, Vētra sang during the tour at the Liepāja Opera. In January 1931 he gave two farewell concerts before leaving for Germany. There Vētra initially gave performances at the circus under the assumed name of Mārtiņš Vells, under which he also recorded albums of light music, then toured Germany, gaining particular success in the opera "Mahogany" by Kurt Weill. Vētra continued writing for the newspapers "Latvis", "Pēdējā Brīdī", "Latvijas Karavīrs", the magazine "Daugava", also using the pseudonym M. Dūka.

In the spring of 1933 he returned to Riga and sang in the performances "Poet's Love" and "Paganini" at the Dailes theatre. Vētra had sued the administration of the Opera, and the court sentenced conciliation and ordered that he be paid compensation.

Vētra was invited to sing at the Operas and concert halls of various countries. He toured Austria (the Vienna Opera, Graz), the Czech Republic (Prague), Poland, Stockholm (on the celebration of November 18, Latvian Independence Day), and Italy (a concert in Rome). In October 1936, he gave guest performances in Soviet Russia, again in 1937.

Vētra had gained notice with the recordings of popular songs for the albums of "Bellaccord Electro".

In 1934, Vētra took part in the German movie "Spring Fairy" (Frühlingsmärchen) (directed by Carl Froelich), in which he played an Italian fisherman – a recently discovered natural tenor. The opening performance took place at the cinema "Forum".

Also in 1934, Vētra directed the performance of the operetta "Mountain song" (orig. Frühling, later Das Fürstenkind) at the National Theatre, opening on May 15.

Starting from 1935, Vētra had many roles at the National Opera as a free-lancer – Goesta Berling in the opera "The Cavaliers of Ekeby" (I cavalieri di Ekebù) by Riccardo Zandonai, Grishka in the opera "The Legend of the Invisible City of Kitezh" by Rimski-Korsakow.

In 1935, he published a book, "Div’dūjiņas" ("Two Doves") about the experience of the Liberty fights.

=== 1940–1946 ===
In 1940, during the Soviet occupation of Lavia, Vētra directed several one-act plays at the National Theatre, and also sung the part of Grigory Melekhov in the opera "Tihij Don". He also gave chamber music concerts, including songs with subtexts understandable by the audiences.

During the German occupation, Vētra continued singing at the Riga Opera, gave concerts at the Aula-hall of the university. On March 15, 1944, Vētra took part in the first performance of the cantata "Dievs, Tava zeme deg!" ("God, Your Earth is Burning!") by Lūcija Garūta at the Church of St. Gertrude.

On October 8, 1944, Vētra's family fled to Sweden by refugee boat. They arrived first in Gotland, and later went to Stockholm. To earn a living, Vētra took odd jobs, including hard physical labour. As Vētra had worked at the Opera, the Refugee Aid Bureau sent him to the Royal Opera, where he had to work in a dark cellar, writing in the sheet music books the text of operas in Swedish. Vētra became an active author for the recently formed press edition "Latvju Ziņas".

=== Life and work in Canada ===
In 1946, Vētra was offered work at the Canadian Opera, so he gave a farewell concert, which was reviewed by Oļģerts Bištēviņš; the review has survived. In January 1947, Vētra and family moved to Canada, where the situation in the meantime had changed, and he was refused the job; therefore Vētra went to Halifax and started working at the Conservatoire of Halifax, where he founded an opera course.

In Halifax, Vētra did substantial organizing work, looking for employers, so as to make it easier for the Latvian refugees to survive in Canada until they could to return to Latvia. Initially Vētra himself met each ship bringing refugees and tried to help them. The group of local Latvians formed the Latvian Relief Association in order to aid Vētra and Teodors Brilts (former baritone of the Latvian National Opera) also financially; Vētra was the first Head of the Association.

In 1950, jointly with Canadian Latvian National Association of Toronto (headed by K. Dobelis), it founded the united Latvian National Association in Canada.

While working in Halifax, where there were neither an Opera house, nor an orchestra, Vētra together with his students gave concerts of opera excerpts, and in 1949, inviting also other musically gifted people, staged the opera "Don Giovanni", which was the first opera production in the city. The inhabitants of Halifax appreciated the quality of the performances, and it helped Vētra to promote the formation of the Nova Scotia Opera Association, in which he together with the conductor and pianist Alfrēds Strombergs performed the functions of the art director and stage director. The Opera Association started to support opera productions financially. Vētra also stimulated the formation of the symphonic orchestra of the Conservatoire of Halifax. He produced productions of "Stories of Hoffmann" by Offenbach, "La Traviata" by Verdi (both in 1950), "Madame Butterfly" by Puccini and "Le Nozze di Figaro" by Mozart (both in 1951), as well as the operetta "Graefin Mariza" by I. Kalman (1952).

In 1953, Vētra and his family moved to Toronto, where he formed the Vocal Studio. One of the most outstanding pupils was Marta Macvicar, who despite being of Irish descent, also sang in Latvian. The Studio gave concerts and even toured the United States.

In 1954, the publishing house "Grāmatu Draugs" in New York published the memoirs by Vētra "Mans Baltais nams" ("My White House") and "Karaļa viesi" ("The King's Guests"). His books "Rīga toreiz..." ("Riga at that time...", 1955) and "Sestā kolonna" ("The Sixth Column", 1957) were also published there. Vētra wrote many publications for newspapers as well: "Latvju Ziņas" (in Sweden), "Laiks" (in the USA), "Latvija Amerikā" (in Canada) and "Latvija" (in Germany). In all the books and articles there is a rich heritage material. During the USSR years, people were arrested for reading and having at home the books by Vētra. Vētra's writing became legal in Latvia only in 1990.

Vētra was an active participant in the culture and social life of Canadian Latvians even until 1962, when he had a stroke and could not sing any more. He died on December 24, 1965, in Toronto, and was buried in the local Latvian cemetery in the territory of the North York cemetery.

== The characters performed by the singer ==
- Don Jose in "Carmen" by Bizet
- Goesta Berling in "The Cavaliers of Ekeby" by Candonai
- Title part in "Faust" by Gounod
- Title part in "Verter" by Massenet
- Belmonte in "Die Entfuerung aus dem Serail" by Mozart
- Hoffmann in "Les Contes d’Hoffmann" by Offenbach
- Canio in "I Pagliacci" by Leoncavallo
- Lensky in "Eugen Onegin" by Tschaikovski
- Herman in "Pique Dame" by Tschaikovski
- Title part in "Lohengrin" by Richard Wagner
- Title part in "Tanhaeuser" by Wagner
- Rodolfo in "La Boheme" by Puccini
- Cavaradossi in "Tosca" by Puccini
- Des Grieux in "Manon Lescaut" by Puccini
- Title part in "Otello" by Verdi
- Riccardo in "Un Ballo in Maschera" by Verdi,
- Radames in "Aida" by Verdi,
- Alfredo in "La Traviata" by Verdi,
- Duke of Mantua in "Rigoletto" by Verdi
- Count Bosco Nero in "La vedova scaltra" by Wolf-Ferrari
- Title part in "Andrea Chenier" by Giordano
- Grishka Kuterna in "Skasanie o newidimom grade Kitesche" by Rimski-Korsakow
- Indian Merchant in "Sadko" by Rimski-Korsakow
- Title part in "Hamlet" by J. Kalniņš
- Edgars in "Ugunī" by J. Kalniņš
- Vižuts in "Baņuta" by A. Kalniņš

== Writing ==
- Div' dūjiņas. Apgāds "Zemnieka Domas", 1935. p. 108. (reprinted by publishing house "Artava", 1991, p. 169)
- Mans baltais nams. "Grāmatu Draugs", 1954., (reprinted by publishing house "Teātra anekdotes", 1991, p. 248)
- Karaļa viesi: bēgļa atmiņas. "Grāmatu Draugs", 1954, p. 276; ISBN 5-410-00980-0
- Rīga toreiz: atmiņas. "Grāmatu Draugs", 1955, p. 328 (reprinted by publishing house "Liesma", 1994, p. 311; edition in Russian by publishing house "Elpa", 2003. p. 395); ISBN 5-410-01069-8
- Sestā kolonna. "Grāmatu Draugs", 1957, p. 269. (reprinted by publishing house "Liesma", 1993, p. 222); ISBN 5-410-01029-9
- Neprāta cildenie pamati. Publishing house "Likteņstāsti", 1995, p. 67; ISBN 9984-536-62-9
- Mariss Vētra. Atbalsis. Raksti un vēstules Eiropā 1921 – 1946. Agra Redoviča atlase un komentāri. Publishing house "Mansards", 2013, p. 605; ISBN 978-9984-81293-9

== Most popular songs ==
- No manis neaizej
- Māte, es nākšu
- Dzīvīte
- Dzintarjūras krastā
- Mīlas šaubas
- Skaistā dārzniece
- Debess tumša, mākoņaina (Vensku Edvarta vārdi)
- Nekad tu neredzēsi mani
- Meitenīte
- Latvju jūrnieka sveiciens
- Kas gan var satriekt īstu jūras vilku
- Rudzupuķu zilas
- Bel Ami
- Kā var aizmirst
- Divas sirdis
- Vēl vakar
- Ziedonī
- Dziļi acīs man ieskaties
- Skūpstījis es esmu daudzas
- Jaunības dziesma
- Dažu skaistu ziedu
- Sen tas bij' pie Ventas
- Nevis slinkojot un pūstot

== See also ==
- Carl Froelich
- Franz Lehár
- List of operas and operettas by Lehár

== Sources ==
- Volfgangs Dārziņš. Vētram septītajā desmitā iekāpjot. Magazine "Tilts" (ASV), 1961, No. 42./43.
- Astrīda Aļķe. Rīgas bruņinieks Mariss Vētra. 1. daļa. Publishing House "Treji Deviņi", 2001., pp 188.; ISBN 9984-714-07-1
- Div' dūjiņas. Apgāds "Zemnieka Domas", 1935. 108 lpp. (Repeated Issue by Publishing House "Artava", 1991., pp 169)
- Mans baltais nams. "Grāmatu Draugs", 1954., (Repeated Issue by Publishing House "Teātra anekdotes", 1991., pp 248)
- Karaļa viesi: bēgļa atmiņas. "Grāmatu Draugs", 1954., pp 276.; ISBN 5-410-00980-0
- Rīga toreiz: atmiņas. "Grāmatu Draugs", 1955. 328 lpp. (Repeated Issue by Publishing House "Liesma", 1994, pp 311; Issue in Russian by Publishing House "Elpa", 2003., pp 395); ISBN 5-410-01069-8
- Sestā kolonna. "Grāmatu Draugs", 1957. 269 lpp. (Repeated Issue by Publishing House "Liesma", 1993., pp 222); ISBN 5-410-01029-9
- Neprāta cildenie pamati. Publishing House "Likteņstāsti", 1995., p. 67.; ISBN 9984-536-62-9
- Mariss Vētra. Atbalsis. Raksti un vēstules Eiropā 1921–-1946. Agra Redoviča atlase un komentāri. Publishing House "Mansards", 2013. p. 605 ISBN 978-9984-81293-9
- "Nova Scotia opera association". Encyclopedia of Music in Canada.
