= Mir (band) =

Canadian alternative rock and pop music group

- Origin: Halifax, Nova Scotia, Canada
- Genre: Alternative rock
- Years active: 1996–present
- Labels: AASH Records, Silversonic Records, MapleNationwide/Fontana North, East West Records
- Members: Adam Dowling; Asif Illyas; Shehab Illyas
- Website: mirwebsite.com (Defunct)

Mir is a Canadian alternative rock and pop music group founded in 1996 and based in Halifax, Nova Scotia. Asif Illyas is the band's lead vocalist, guitarist, and pianist. His brother Shehab Illyas is the bassist and vocalist, and Adam Dowling is drummer and a second vocalist. The brothers were born in Sri Lanka and raised in England; Dowling is a Nova Scotia native and former drummer for Ashley MacIsaac.

== History ==
In 1997, the brothers independently released their six-track EP, What's Wrong With Being Sexy?. Dowling joined them in 1998.

In 1999, they were signed by East West Records and, in 2000, released their debut album, Invisible Science. Invisible Science garnered four award nominations from the East Coast Music Association: Pop/Rock Recording of the Year in 2001 and, in 2002, the single "Invisible Science" brought nominations for Recording of the Year, Song of the Year and Group Recording of the Year. Asif Illyas was nominated for Songwriter of the Year.

Also in 1999, Mir launched its annual event, The MIR Supershow, a 25-band concert that celebrates and raises money for the Centre For Diverse Visible Culture.

In April 2003, Mir took part in 'Atlantic Scene', a showcase of Atlantic culture that took place at the National Arts Centre in Ottawa. That year, the band's song "State of Emergency" was included in the compilation album The Great Stupa, along with songs by artists such as Joni Mitchell, Sting, and Leonard Cohen.

In 2004, Mir released their second album, 7 Directions. At the 2005 East Coast Music Awards, the album received nominations for Rock Recording of the Year and Video of the Year. Also that year, East West re-released Invisible Science in Europe, as Invisible Science MMIV. They went on tour in Europe, and played the Rock am Ring and Rock im Park festivals.

Also in 2005, Mir organized a fundraiser for victims of the tsunami in Sri Lanka, and in 2006 they traveled to Sri Lanka with a CBC news crew who were documenting the relief and reconstruction efforts.

In 2006, Mir released The Acoustic Record, which brought them to the attention of Germany's Silversonic Records, who signed them to a deal to promote an album which combined songs from The Acoustic Record and 7 Directions. The deal also included another European tour. At the 2006 East Coast Music Awards, The Acoustic Record brought nominations for Alternative Recording of the Year and Group Recording of the Year.

In 2008, the band released the album OK2Go!. It was nominated for Pop Recording of the Year at the 2009 East Coast Music Awards. Asif Illyas was nominated as Songwriter of the Year for "U Dream".

While they did not officially disband, Dowling has been playing for the country music singer George Canyon. In 2013, Asif Illyas released a solo project titled Synesthesia. The album won the award for World Recording of the Year at the 2014 East Coast Music Awards. He has also recorded on albums for Cutting Crew, Gordie Sampson, Rita MacNeil, and Lennie Gallant.

In 2013, Shehab Illyas, recording under the name 'Knight', released the album Top of the World. It was accompanied by a 30-minute film which he wrote and directed. He has also been recording on albums, and/or shooting videos, for Alan Doyle, Ria Mae, and Beòlach.

== Discography ==
- 1998: What's Wrong with Being Sexy?, Independent
- 2001: Invisible Science, East West Records
- 2004: 7 Directions, MapleNationwide
- 2004: Invisible Science MMIV, East West Re-Release Europe
- 2005: The Acoustic Record, Independent
- 2006: 7 Directions, Silversonic Records Re-Release Europe
- 2008: OK2GO!, Fontana North
- 2008: "A Soldier's Carol" Christmas EP

== Compilation inclusions ==
- 2003: The Great Stupa, Wintrup Musik Publishing
