= Nova Scotia Opera Association =

Canadian opera company

The Nova Scotia Opera Association was a Canadian opera company founded in 1950 by Alfred Strombergs and Mariss Vetra. The company performed at the Capitol Theatre in Halifax until 1956.

== History ==
The Nova Scotia Opera Association was founded in 1950 by Alfred Strombergs and Mariss Vetra, following Vetra's 1949 performance of Mozart's Don Giovanni at a Dalhousie University gymnasium in Halifax. The company held annual productions at the Capitol Theatre in Halifax, including Offenbach's The Tales of Hoffmann performed by 14 soloists in 1950, which Vetra said showed "that Nova Scotia is able to supply even such a large number of singing artists." The success of the program prompted Stromsbergs to consider forming a permanent orchestra to present at concerts as opposed to hiring freelance musicians, stating:

We shall be able to have a first-class orchestra that, working with the Opera Association and kindred organizations, will make Halifax the Eastern fortress of Canadian culture and art. I hope that the public will respond with enthusiasm to this prime necessity – a symphony for Halifax!

The Halifax Symphonette was thus established a few years later, becoming the Halifax Symphony Orchestra in 1955 under the direction of Thomas Mayer.

The company performed Verdi's La traviata in 1950, Brammer and Grünwald's Countess Maritza in 1951, and Puccini's Madama Butterfly in 1952, also at the Capitol Theatre. A commissioned work, Trevor Morgan Jones' The Broken Ring, premiered on 15 August 1953. In 1954, the company performed Zhurbin's Orpheus and Eurydice and Mascagni's Cavalleria rusticana. This was followed by Verdi's Rigoletto in 1955, and Gounod's Faust in 1956.

In 1953, Vetra left Halifax for Toronto, followed by Stromsbergs in 1955. The Opera Association stopped performing in 1956, with the supporting group going on to sponsor appearances by the Canadian Opera Company in 1958 and 1960.

== Bibliography ==
- Henson, Guy (7 February 2006). "Nova Scotia Opera Association". The Canadian Encyclopedia. Toronto, ON: Historica Canada. Archived from the original on 24 January 2025.
- Helmer, Paul (2009). Growing with Canada: The Emigré Tradition in Canadian Music. Montreal, QC: McGill–Queen's University Press. p. 152. ISBN 978-0-7735-3581-7 – via the Internet Archive.
- Sadie, Stanley (1992). The New Grove Dictionary of Opera. Vol. 2. London: Palgrave Macmillan. p. 601. ISBN 0-9358-5992-6 – via the Internet Archive.
