= Halifax Symphony Orchestra =

Canadian orchestra

The Halifax Symphony Orchestra was the name of two different professional orchestras in Halifax, Nova Scotia. The first orchestra was founded by the violinist and conductor Max Weil in 1897. The orchestra remained active for eleven seasons, disbanding in 1908 when Weil left the city.

The second Halifax Symphony Orchestra was founded by Alfred Strombergs in 1949 as an un-named orchestra to accompany the opera and ballet performances of the Nova Scotia Opera Association. It expanded into a professional symphony orchestra under the name of Halifax Symphony Orchestra in 1955. It presented approximately 70 concerts annually until it was disbanded in 1968.
