= Maritime Conservatory of Performing Arts =

Coordinates: 44.65017°N 63.59766°W

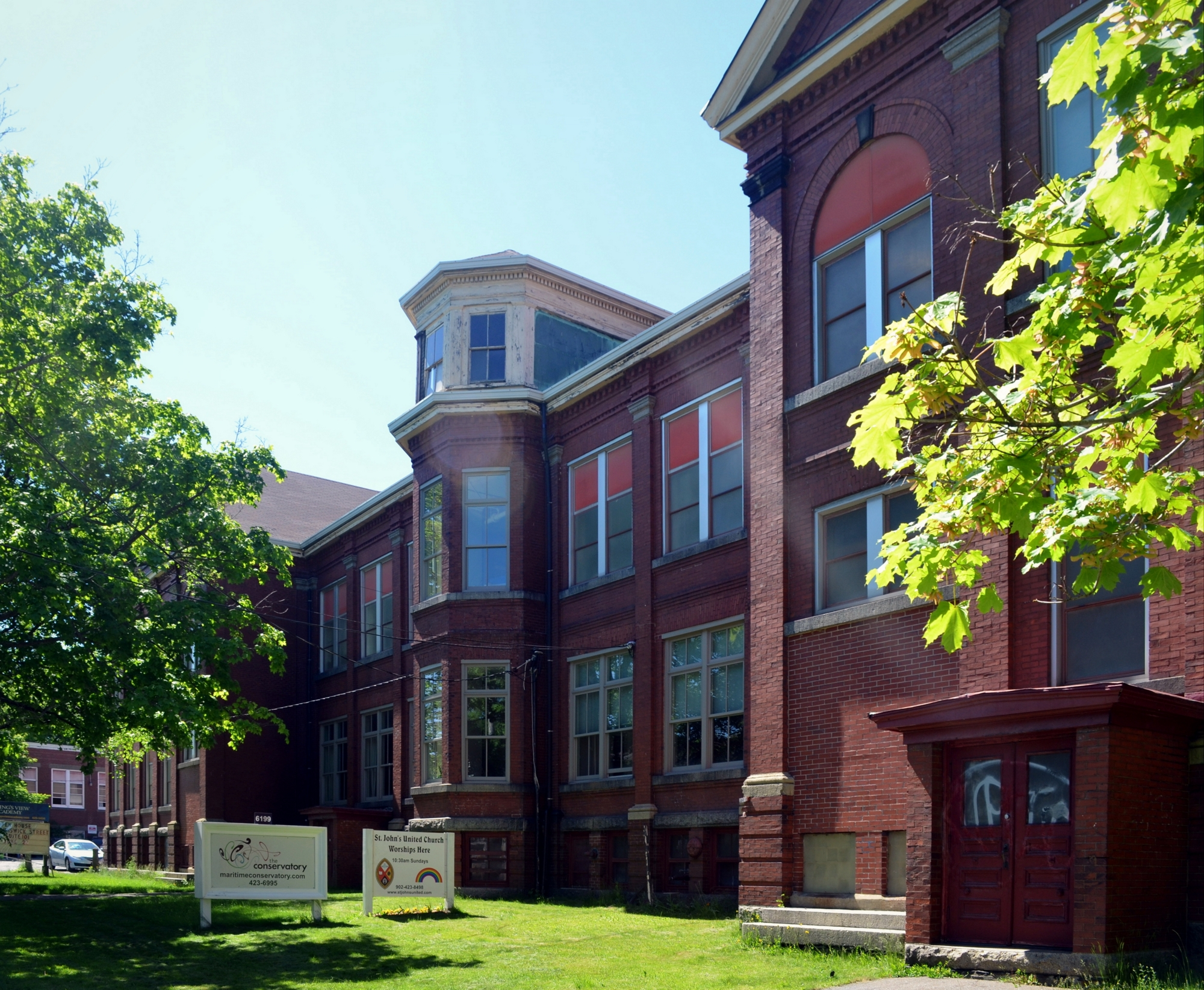

Location
- 6199 Chebucto Road; Halifax, Nova Scotia, B3L 1K7; Canada

Information
- Established: 1887
- Director: Chloe Kline
- Dean (Dance): Janet Bradbury
- Dean (Music): Neven Prostran
- Enrolment: 1200
- Campus type: Urban

The Maritime Conservatory of Performing Arts (the Conservatory) is a Canadian performing arts school in Halifax, Nova Scotia, that offers courses in higher education in music, dance, and theatre. It is the largest and the oldest (1887) of such organizations for education in the performing arts east of Montreal. The Conservatory has been located at the historic Chebucto School in West End, Halifax, since 1996.

== History ==
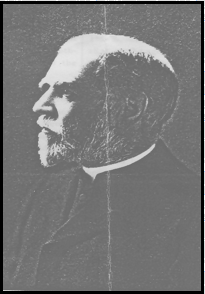
Rev Robert Laing, founder of the Maritime Conservatory of the Arts

When the school was founded by Reverend Robert Laing in 1887, it was named the Halifax Conservatory of Music. It was founded under Chapter 91 of the Acts of the Legislature of Nova Scotia. In 1891, the first public performance was held, a concert by the Dresden Trio.

In 1921, under a Special Act of the Province of Nova Scotia, the Halifax Conservatory of Music (HCM) was incorporated. Beginning in 1954, the school offered ballroom dancing instruction.

In 1954 the Halifax Conservatory of Music (HCM) bought the assets of the Maritime Academy of Music (MAM), and the school was renamed the Maritime Conservatory of Music.

In its initial years, the school awarded degrees through Dalhousie University, but became an independent institution in 1962. In 1998 the school changed its name again to the Maritime Conservatory of Performing Arts to reflect the school's expansion into other performance mediums beyond music. This name change was legally changed when the Maritime Conservatory of Performing Arts was confirmed in Chapter 11 of the Acts of 2006, titled The Maritime Conservatory Reorganization Act, which received Royal Assent on July 14, 2006.

The Conservatory moved over seven times sharing and renting space until 1996 when it moved to the Chebucto School, a historic 1910 landmark building in the West End of Halifax. The Conservatory acquired ownership of the Chebucto Road School in 1997 from the City of Halifax. The municipality sold the building for a dollar with the stipulation that close to half a million dollars be spent on renovations. (The Chebucto Road School, built in 1910, served as a morgue following the 1917 Halifax Explosion.)

In February 2018, the Conservatory was temporarily closed when a section of its roof was blown off during a wind storm.

== Present day ==
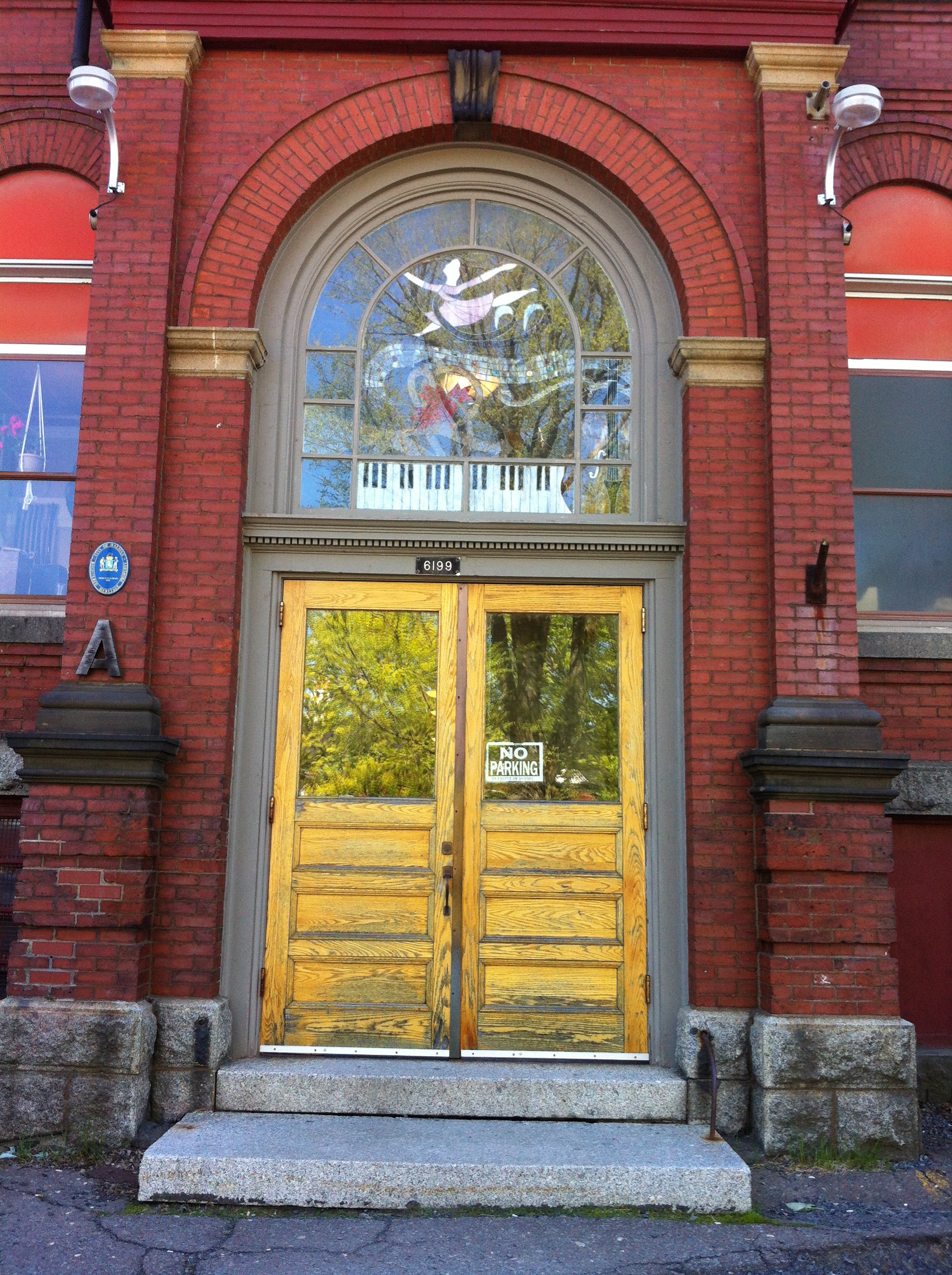
Maritime Conservatory of Performing Arts

The Maritime Conservatory of Performing Arts continues to offer an accessible and comprehensive program of dance and music instruction, accommodating students of all ages and levels of ability.

As of 2018, the Conservatory was registered as a private career college with the Labour and Advanced Education Department of Nova Scotia. The School of Dance now offers a two-year advanced diploma for dance instructors.

The school hosts and organizes a variety of concerts and dance performances. Each year the National Ballet School holds auditions there, and the conservatory hosts a chamber orchestra.

== Notable students and faculty ==
- Portia White
- Howard Brown
- Harry Dean
- Jim Fidler
- Daurene Lewis
- Frederick Henry Sexton
- Drew Gagnon
- Sarah Ann McLachlan
- Diane Oxner

== See also ==
- High School of Performing Arts, New York City (location of the film Fame)
- List of university and college schools of music
